= List of minerals =

This is a list of minerals which have Wikipedia articles.

Minerals are distinguished by various chemical and physical properties. Differences in chemical composition and crystal structure distinguish the various species. Within a mineral species there may be variation in physical properties or minor amounts of impurities that are recognized by mineralogists or wider society as a mineral variety.

Mineral variety names are listed after the valid minerals for each letter.

For a more complete listing of all mineral names, see List of minerals recognized by the International Mineralogical Association.

== A ==
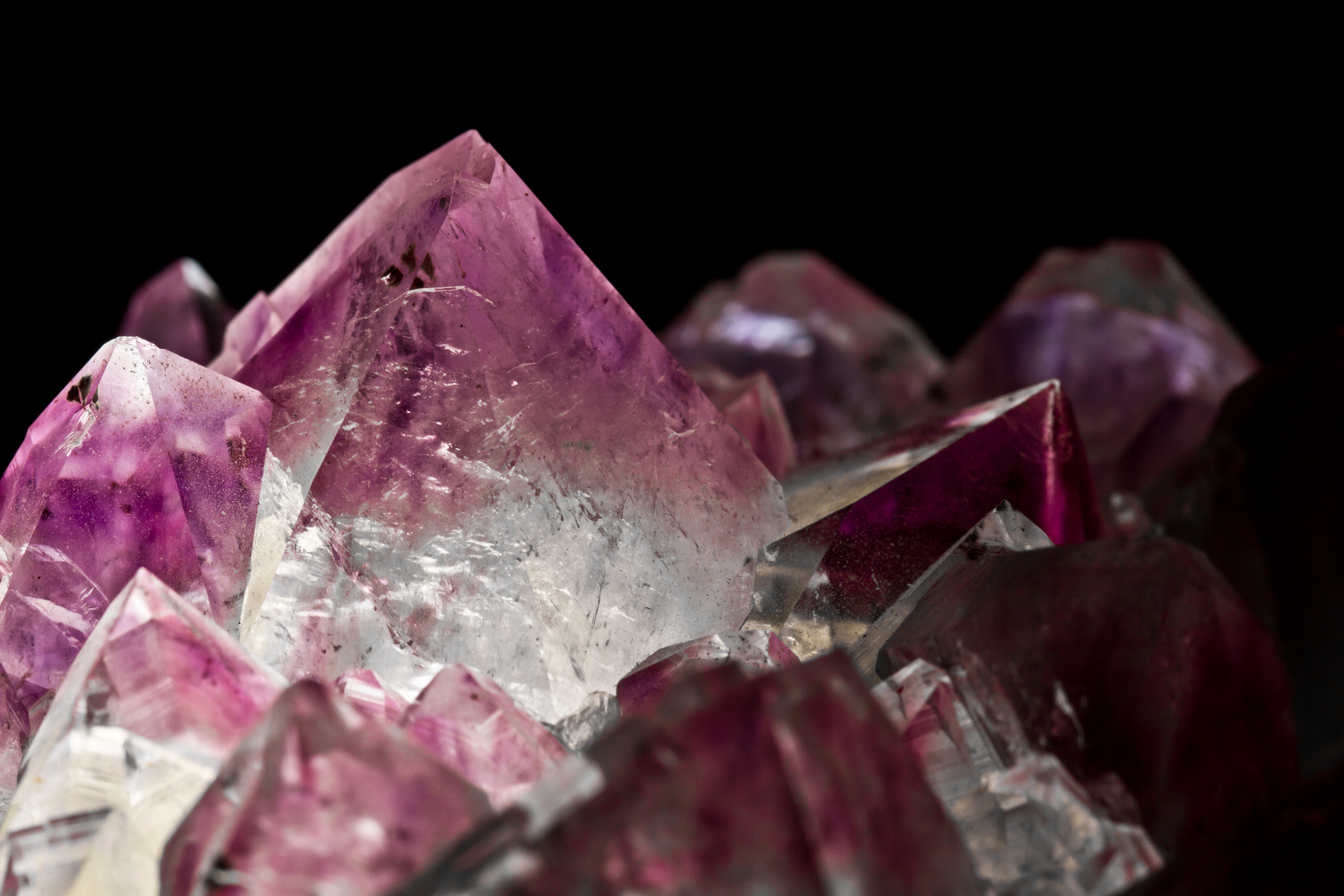
Amethyst crystals – a purple quartz

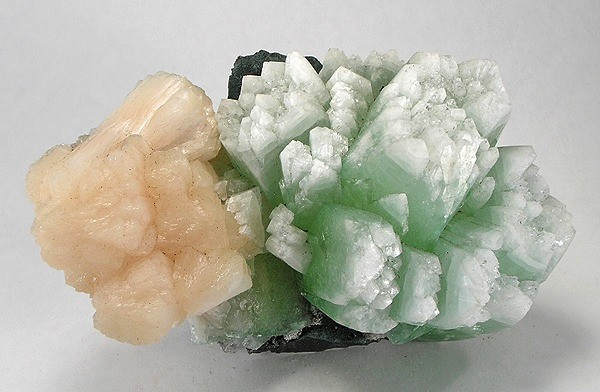
Apophyllite crystals sitting right beside a cluster of peachy bowtie stilbite

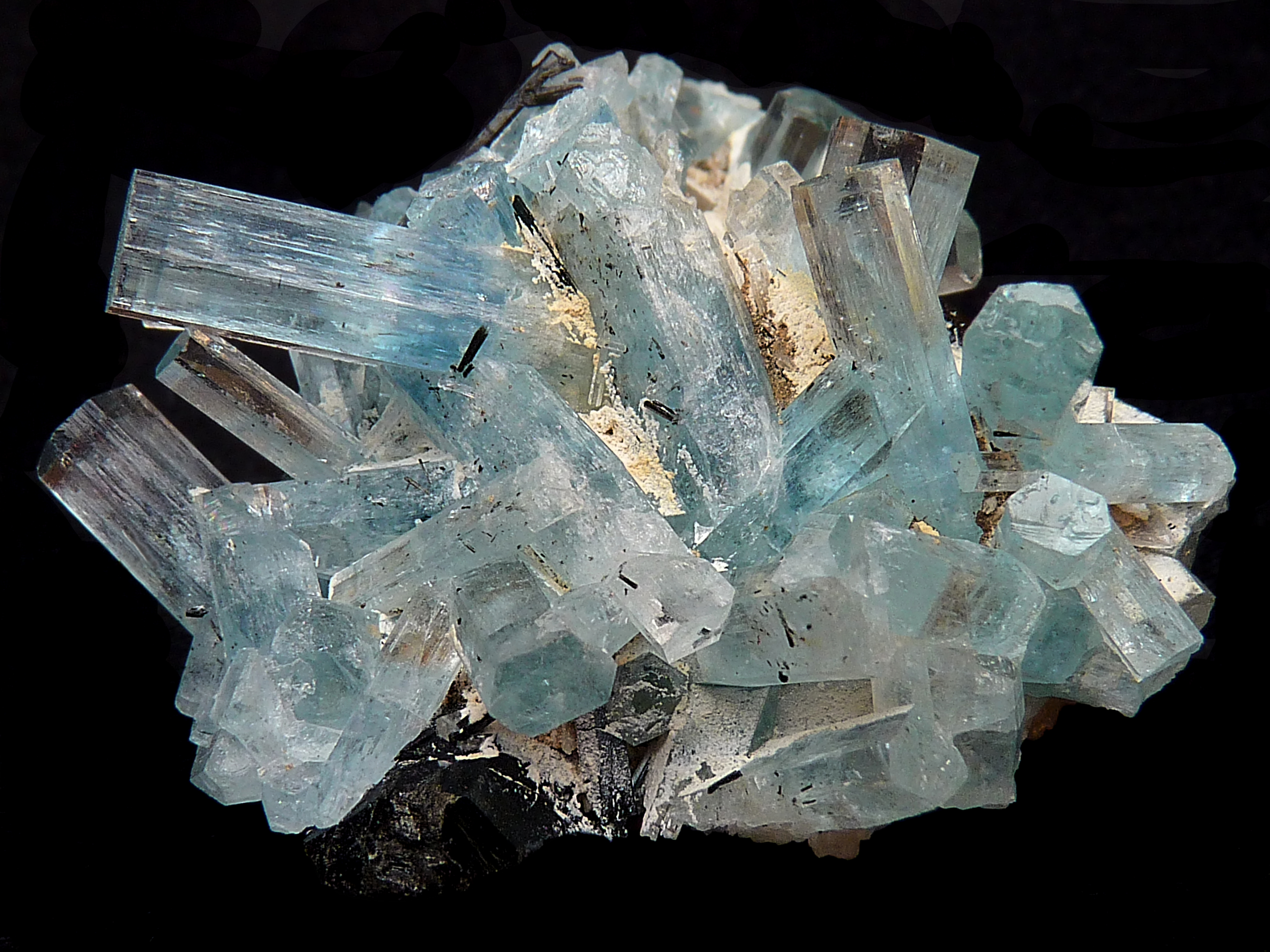
Aquamarine variety of beryl with tourmaline on orthoclase

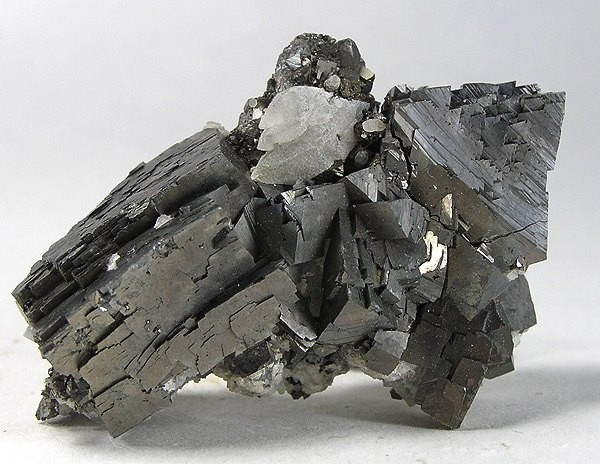
Arsenopyrite from Hidalgo del Parral, Chihuahua, Mexico

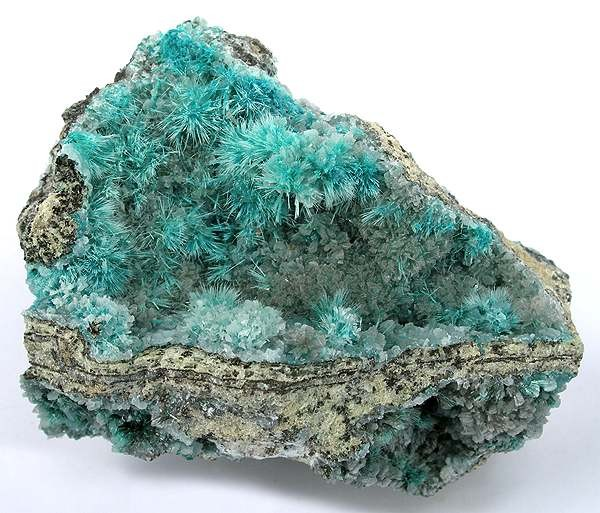
Aurichalcite needles spraying out within a protected pocket lined by bladed calcite crystals

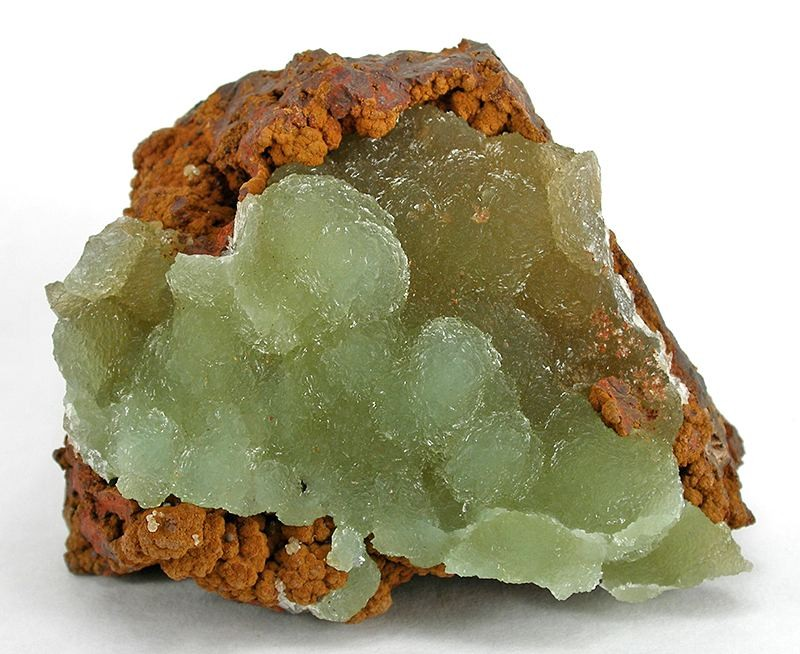
Austinite from the Ojuela Mine, Mapimí, Durango, Mexico

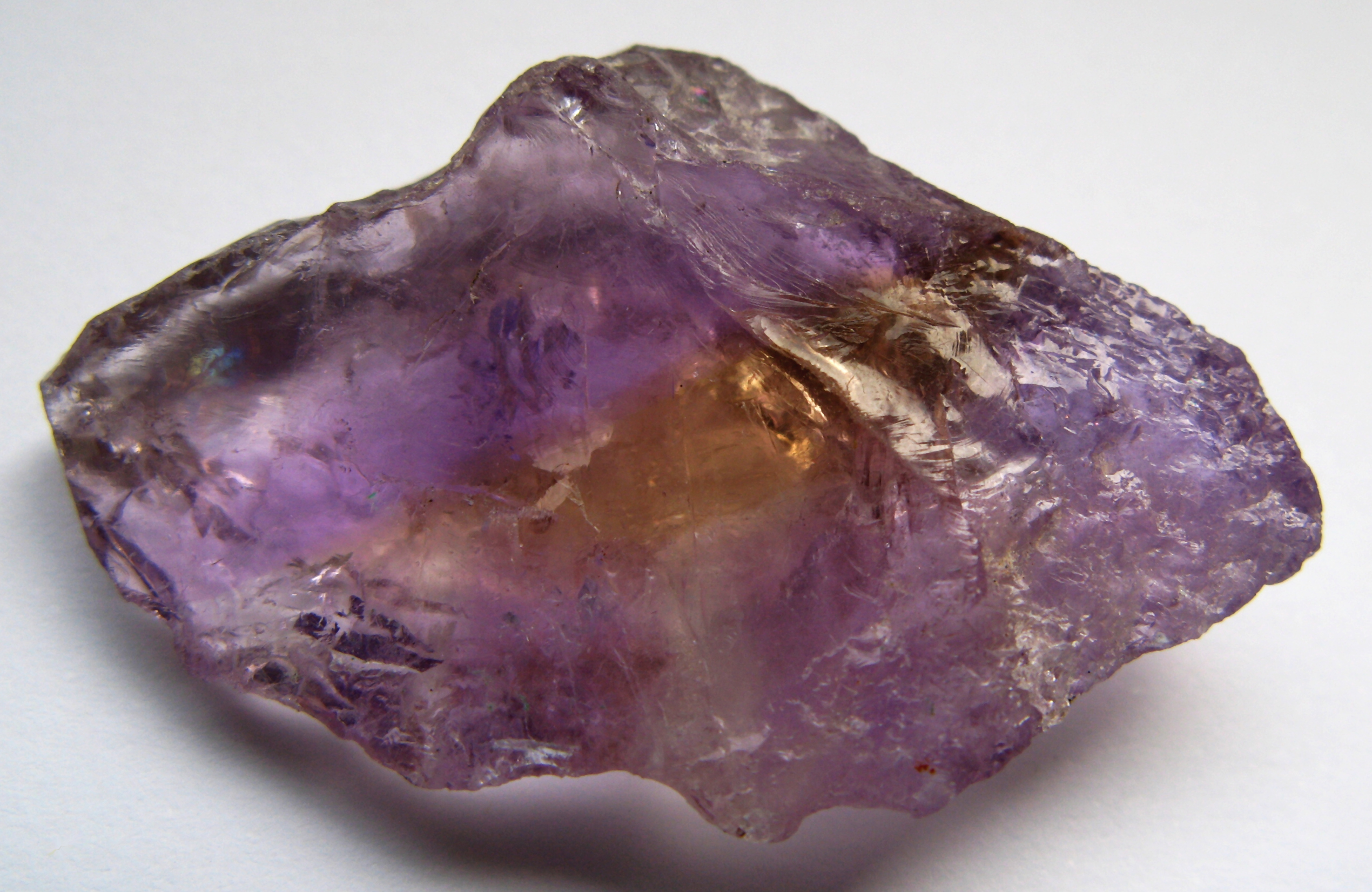
Ametrine containing amethyst and citrine, from Bolivia

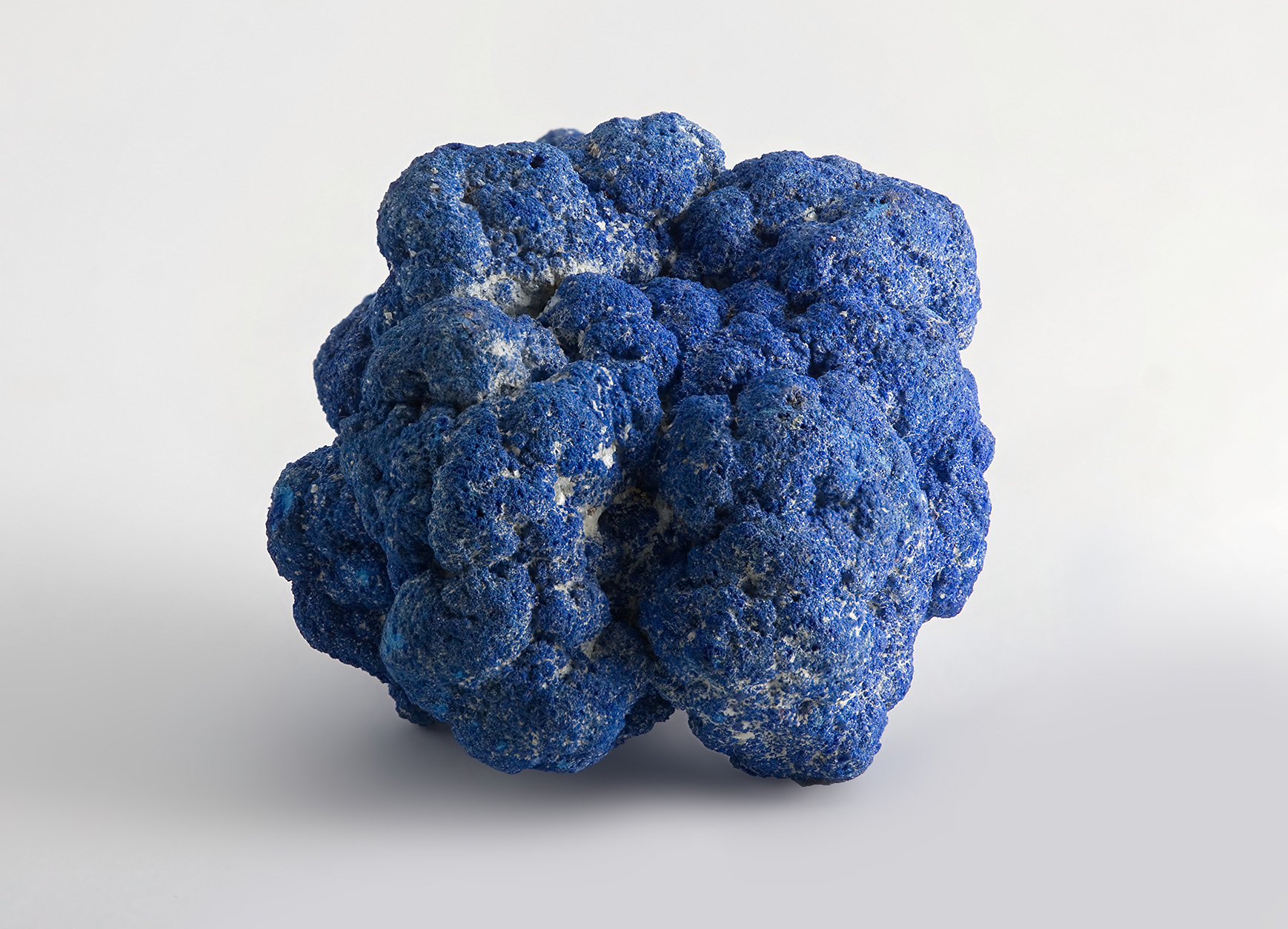
Azurite, Burra Mine, South Australia

- Abellaite
- Abelsonite
- Abenakiite-(Ce)
- Abernathyite
- Abhurite
- Abramovite
- Abswurmbachite
- Abuite
- Acanthite
- Acetamide
- Achalaite
- Achávalite
- Actinolite
- Acuminite
- Adamite
- Adamsite-(Y)
- Adelite
- Admontite
- Adranosite
- Aegirine
- Aegirine-augite
- Aenigmatite
- Aerinite
- Aerugite
- Aeschynite-(Ce)
- Aeschynite-(Nd)
- Aeschynite-(Y)
- Afghanite
- Afmite
- Afwillite
- Agardite
- Agate
- Agrellite
- Agrinierite
- Aguilarite
- Aheylite
- Ahlfeldite
- Aikinite
- Aiolosite
- Ajoite
- Akaganéite
- Akaogiite
- Akatoreite
- Akdalaite
- Åkermanite
- Akhtenskite
- Akimotoite
- Akrochordite
- Aksaite
- Aktashite
- Alabandite
- Alacránite
- Alamosite
- Alarsite
- Albite
- Albrechtschraufite
- Alcantarillaite
- Aldermanite
- Aleksite
- Aleutite
- Alforsite
- Algodonite
- Aliettite
- Allabogdanite
- Allactite
- Allanite
- Allanpringite
- Allantoin
- Allargentum
- Alleghanyite
- Allendeite
- Alloclasite
- Allophane
- Alloriite
- Alluaivite
- Alluaudite
- Almandine
- Almarudite
- Alpeite
- Alpersite
- Alsakharovite-Zn
- Alstonite
- Altaite
- Alterite
- Althausite
- Althupite
- Altisite
- Alum-(K)
- Alum-(Na)
- Aluminite
- Aluminium
- Aluminoceladonite
- Aluminocopiapite
- Aluminosilicate
- Alumohydrocalcite
- Alunite
- Alunogen
- Alvanite
- Amakinite
- Amarantite
- Amblygonite
- Ameghinite
- Amesite
- Amicite
- Aminoffite
- Ammineite
- Amphibole (mineral group)
- Analcime (analcite)
- Anandite
- Anapaite
- Anatase
- Ancylite (mineral group)
- Andalusite
- Andersonite
- Andesine
- Andorite (IV/VI)
- Andradite
- Andrianovite
- Andychristyite
- Andyrobertsite
- Anglesite
- Anhydrite
- Anilite
- Ankerite
- Annabergite
- Annite
- Anorthite
- Anorthoclase
- Antarcticite
- Anthoinite
- Anthonyite
- Anthophyllite
- Antigorite
- Antimonselite
- Antimony
- Antipinite
- Antitaenite
- Antlerite
- Anzaite-(Ce)
- Apachite
- Apatite (mineral group)
- Aphthitalite
- Apjohnite
- Aplowite
- Apophyllite
- Apuanite
- Aqualite
- Aradite
- Aragonite
- Arakiite
- Aramayoite
- Arcanite
- Archerite
- Arctite
- Arcubisite
- Ardaite
- Arfvedsonite
- Argentite
- Argentobaumhauerite
- Argentojarosite
- Argentopyrite
- Argutite
- Argyrodite
- Arhbarite
- Armalcolite
- Armstrongite
- Arsendescloizite
- Arsenic
- Arseniosiderite
- Arsenoclasite
- Arsenolite
- Arsenopyrite
- Arsenuranospathite
- Arthurite
- Artinite
- Artroeite
- Asbecasite
- Asbolane
- Aschamalmite
- Ashburtonite
- Ashcroftine-(Y)
- Ashoverite
- Asisite
- Aspedamite
- Aspidolite
- Astrocyanite-(Ce)
- Astrophyllite
- Atacamite
- Atelestite
- Atencioite
- Athabascaite
- Atheneite
- Attikaite
- Aubertite
- Augelite
- Augite
- Aurichalcite
- Auricupride
- Aurorite
- Aurostibite
- Austinite
- Autunite
- Avicennite
- Avogadrite
- Awaruite
- Axinite (mineral group)
- Azoproite
- Azurite

Varieties that are not valid species:

- Adamantine spar (variety of corundum)
- Agate (variety of chalcedony and quartz)
- Alabaster (variety of gypsum)
- Alexandrite (variety of chrysoberyl)
- Allingite (synonym of amber)
- Alum
- Amazonite (variety of microcline)
- Amethyst (purple variety of quartz)
- Ametrine (variety of quartz)
- Ammolite (organic; also a gemstone)
- Amosite (asbestiform grunerite)
- Antozonite (variety of fluorite)
- Anyolite (metamorphic rock - zoisite, ruby, and hornblende)
- Aquamarine (light blue variety of beryl)
- Argentite (high temperature form of acanthite)
- Asbestos (fibrous serpentine- or amphibole minerals)
- Auerlite (variety of thorite)
- Avalite (chromian variety of illite)
- Aventurine (variety of quartz)

== B ==
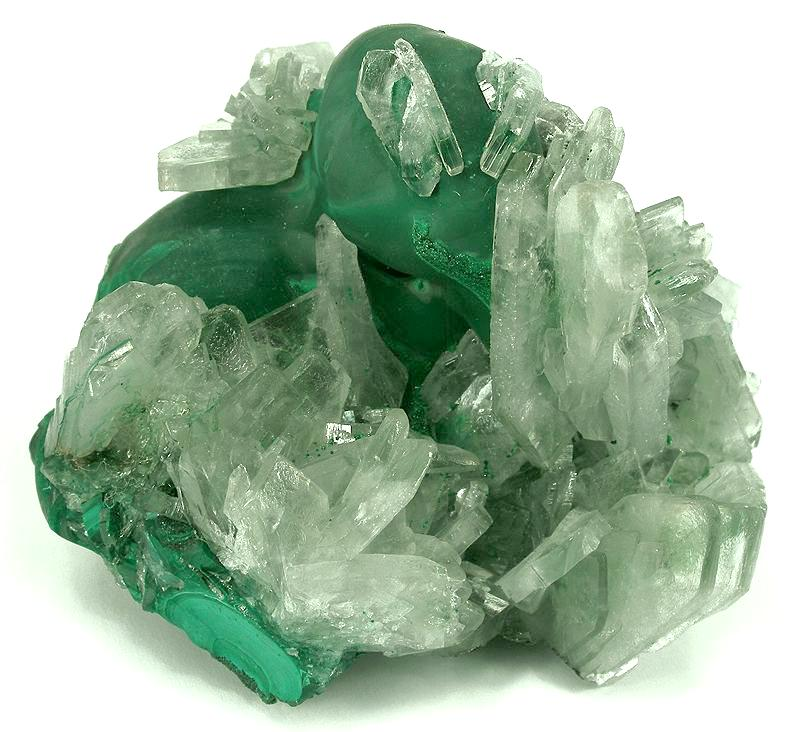
Baryte (included by malachite) on malachite, from Shangulowé Mine, Kambove, Central area, Katanga, Democratic Republic of Congo

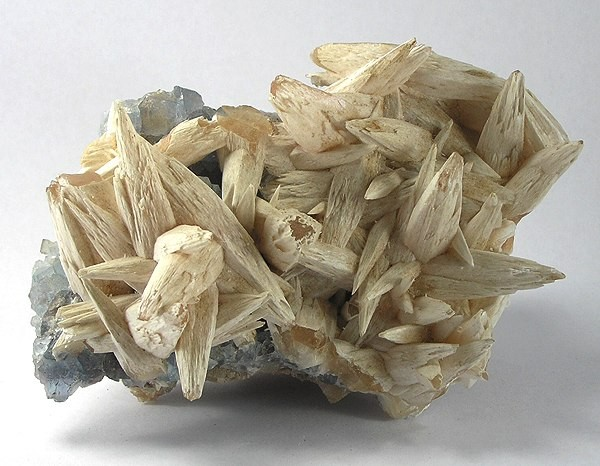
Spiky calcite scalenohedra with a coating of whitish benstonite on a layer of teal-colored fluorite

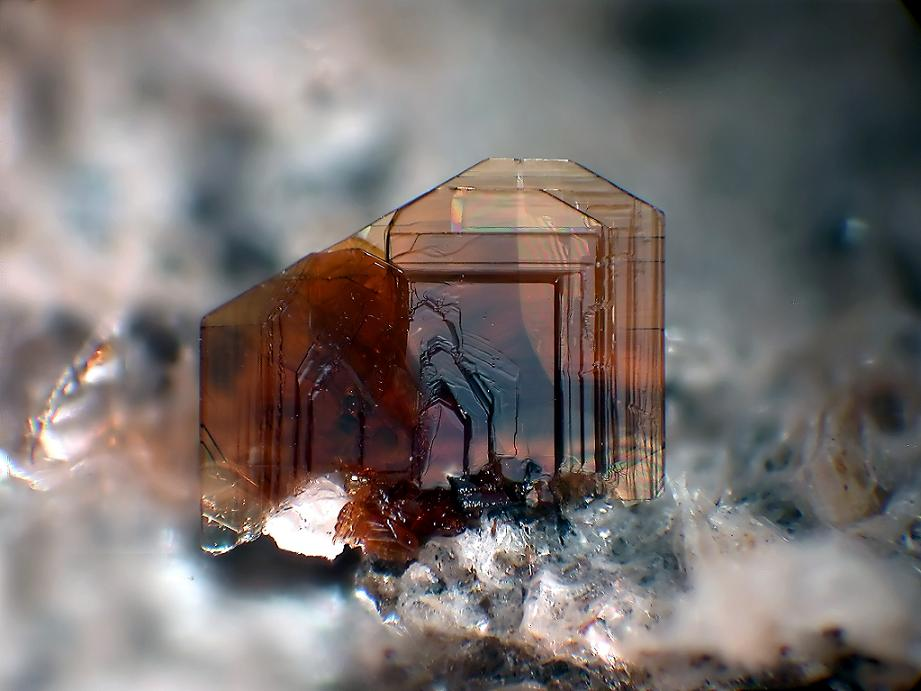
Thin tabular biotite cluster

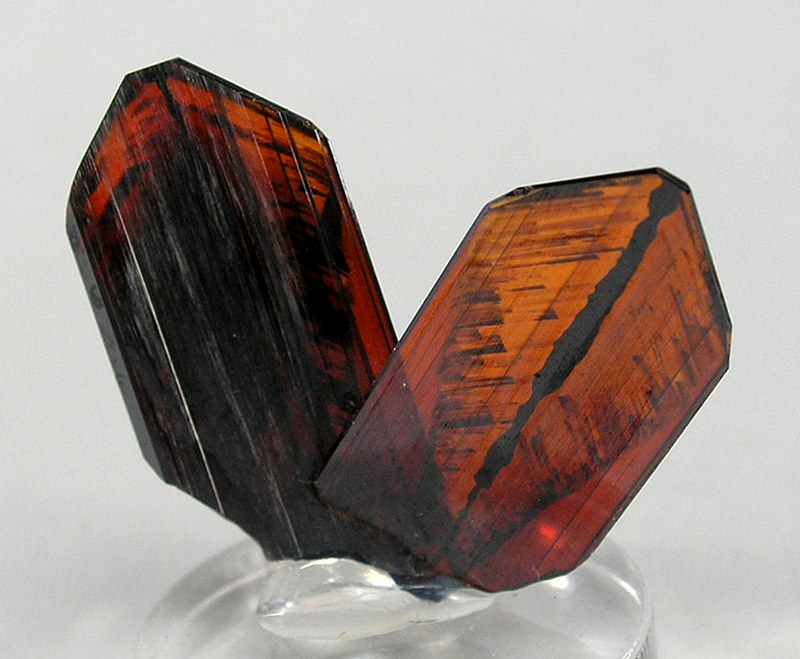
Brookite from Kharan, Balochistan, Pakistan

- Babefphite
- Babingtonite
- Baddeleyite
- Baileychlore
- Bakerite
- Balangeroite
- Banalsite
- Bannisterite
- Baotite
- Bararite
- Baratovite
- Barrerite
- Barstowite
- Baryte (barite)
- Barytocalcite
- Bassanite
- Bastnäsite (mineral group)
- Baumhauerite
- Bavenite
- Bayldonite
- Bayleyite
- Bazzite
- Becquerelite
- Benitoite
- Benstonite
- Bentorite
- Beraunite
- Berborite
- Bergenite
- Berlinite
- Berryite
- Berthierite
- Bertrandite
- Beryl
- Beryllonite
- Beudantite
- Bicchulite
- Biehlite
- Bilibinskite
- Bílinite
- Billietite
- Billwiseite
- Biotite
- Birnessite
- Bischofite
- Bismite
- Bismuth
- Bismuthinite
- Bismutite
- Bityite
- Bixbyite
- Blödite
- Blossite
- Bobfergusonite
- Boehmite
- Boleite
- Boltwoodite
- Bonaccordite
- Boracite
- Borax
- Bornite
- Botallackite
- Botryogen
- Boulangerite
- Bournonite
- Boussingaultite
- Bowieite
- Braggite
- Brassite
- Braunite
- Brazilianite
- Breithauptite
- Brewsterite (series of zeolites)
- Brezinaite
- Brianite
- Brianyoungite
- Briartite
- Bridgmanite
- Brochantite
- Brockite
- Bromargyrite
- Bromellite
- Bronzite
- Brookite
- Brownleeite
- Brownmillerite
- Brucite
- Brushite
- Buddingtonite
- Bukovite
- Bukovskyite
- Bultfonteinite
- Bunsenite
- Bustamite
- Bystrite

Varieties that are not valid species:

- Barbertonite (polytype of stichtite)
- Bauxite (aluminium ore)
- Beckerite (natural resin)
- Bentonite (mixture of montmorillonite and other clays)
- Bixbite (red gem variety of beryl)
- Bowenite (variety of antigorite)
- Brammallite (variety of illite)
- Brokenhillite (not approved by IMA)
- Buergerite (renamed to fluor-buergerite)
- Bursaite (not approved by IMA)
- Bytownite (variety of anorthite)

== C ==
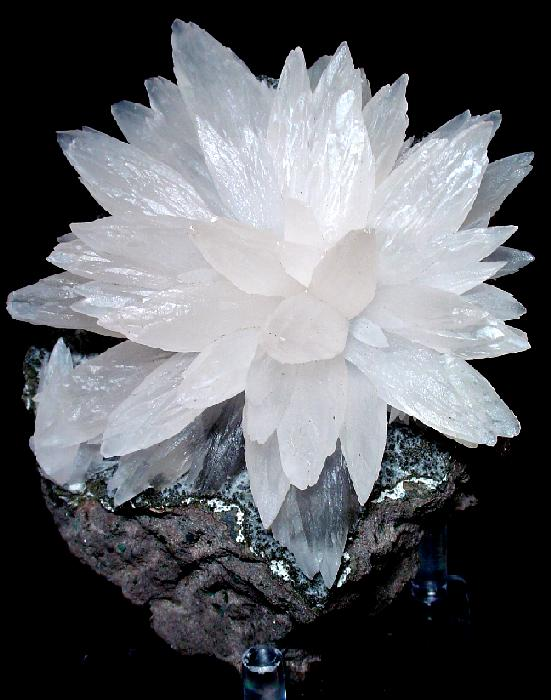
Radiating spray of colorless wheatsheaf calcite crystals on matrix, from Iraí, Rio Grande do Sul, Brazil

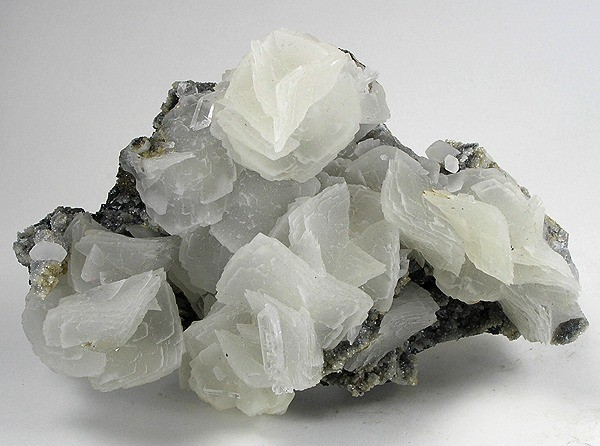
Rhombohedrons of calcite that appear almost as books of petals, piled up 3-dimensionally on the matrix, from Eastern Europe

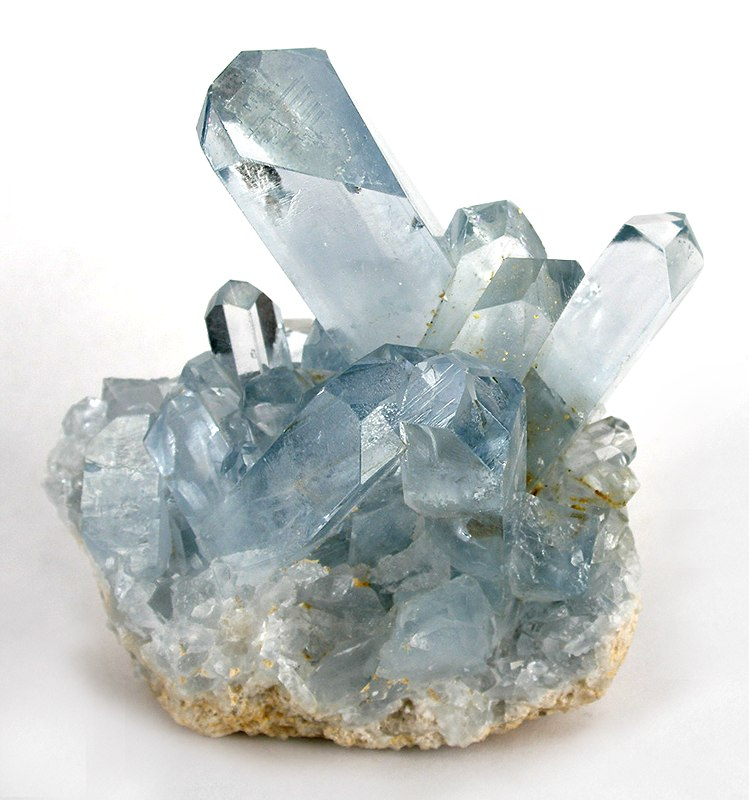
Sky blue, prismatic crystals of celestine from Majunga, Madagascar

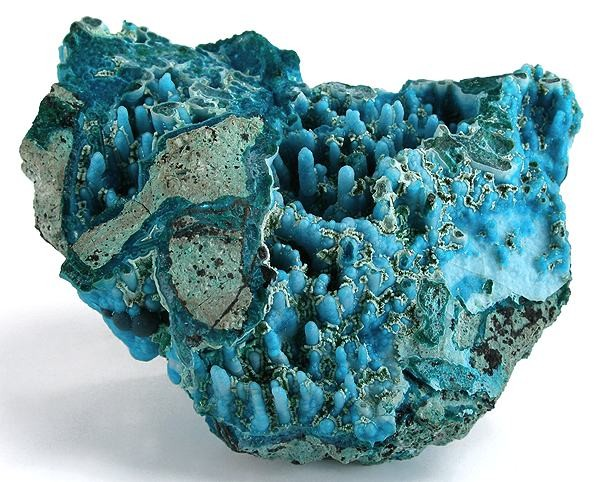
Pocket cavity of small chrysocolla stalactites from Ray Mine, Scott Mountain area, Mineral Creek District, Arizona, USA

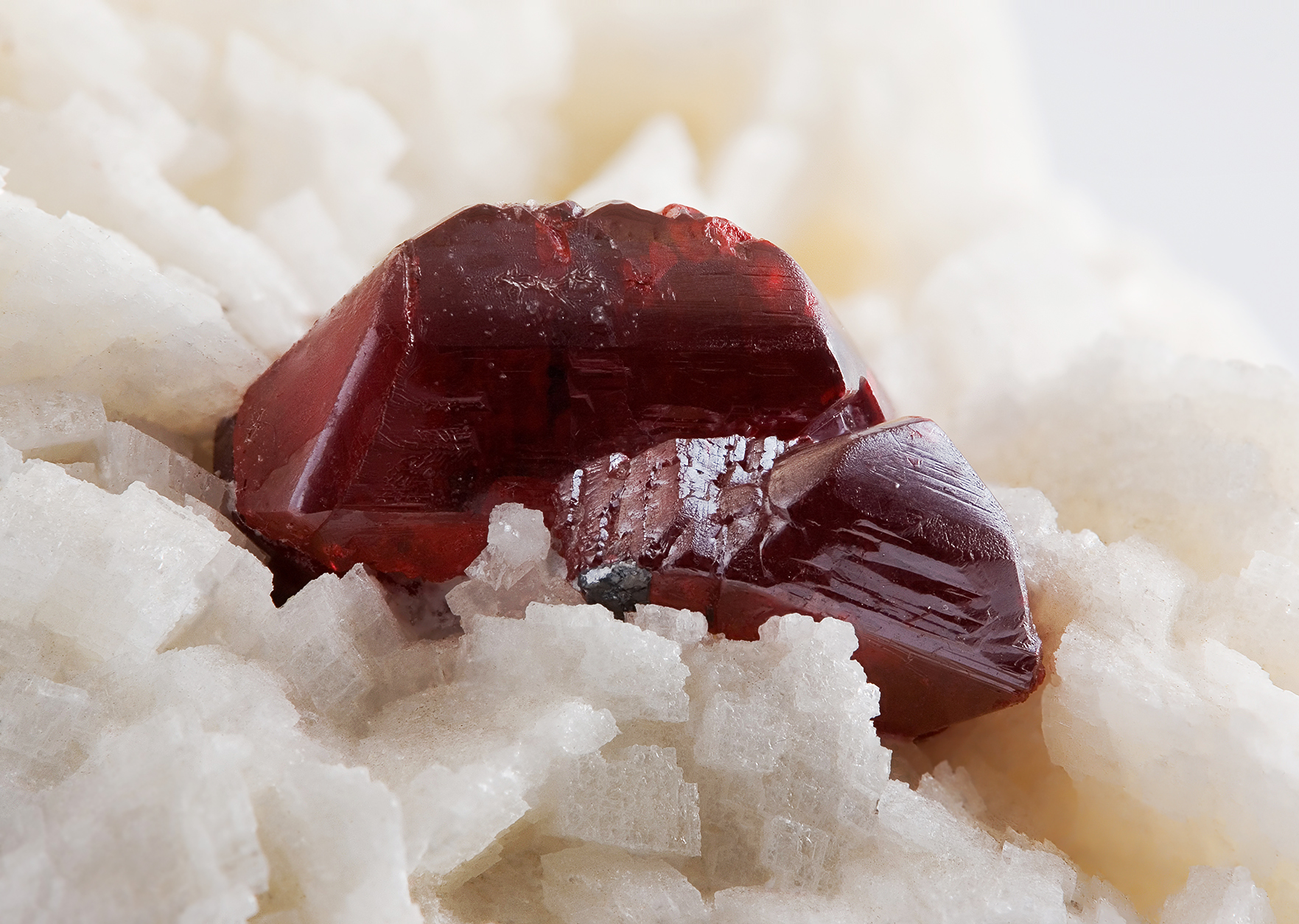
Cinnabar on dolomite

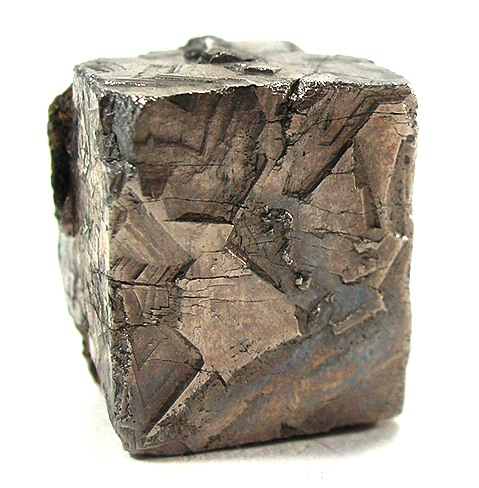
Cubic Cobaltite, Sudbury District, Ontario, Canada

- Cabalzarite
- Cabrerite
- Cabriite
- Cacoxenite
- Cadmium
- Cadmoindite
- Cadmoselite
- Cadwaladerite
- Cafarsite
- Cafetite
- Cahnite
- Calaverite
- Calciborite
- Calcite
- Calderite
- Caledonite
- Calomel
- Calumetite
- Campigliaite
- Canasite
- Canavesite
- Cancrinite
- Canfieldite
- Carletonite
- Carlosruizite
- Carlsbergite
- Carminite
- Carnallite
- Carnotite
- Carobbiite
- Carpathite
- Carpholite
- Carrollite
- Caryopilite
- Cassiterite
- Cattierite
- Cavansite
- Celadonite
- Celestine
- Celsian
- Cerite
- Cerium
- Cerussite
- Cervandonite-(Ce)
- Cervantite
- Cesanite
- Cesbronite
- Chabazite (series of zeolites)
- Chaidamuite
- Chalcanthite
- Chalcocite
- Chalconatronite
- Chalcophyllite
- Chalcopyrite
- Challacolloite
- Chambersite
- Chamosite
- Changbaiite
- Changesite-(Y)
- Chaoite
- Chapmanite
- Charlesite
- Charoite
- Chatkalite
- Chesterite
- Chibaite
- Childrenite
- Chiolite
- Chlorargyrite
- Chlorite (mineral group)
- Chloritoid
- Chlormayenite
- Chlorocalcite
- Chloroxiphite
- Chondrodite
- Chrisstanleyite
- Christite
- Chromite
- Chromium
- Chrysoberyl
- Chrysocolla
- Chrysotile
- Chvaleticeite
- Cinnabar
- Clarkeite
- Claudetite
- Clausthalite
- Clearcreekite
- Cleusonite
- Clinoclase
- Clinohedrite
- Clinohumite
- Clinoptilolite
- Clinozoisite
- Clintonite
- Cobaltite
- Coccinite
- Coconinoite
- Coesite
- Coffinite
- Cohenite
- Colemanite
- Colimaite
- Collinsite
- Coloradoite
- Columbite (mineral group)
- Combeite
- Conichalcite
- Connellite
- Cooperite
- Copiapite
- Copper
- Corderoite
- Cordierite
- Corkite
- Cornubite
- Cornwallite
- Corundum
- Cotunnite
- Covellite
- Coyoteite
- Creedite
- Cristobalite
- Crocoite
- Cronstedtite
- Crookesite
- Crossite (not approved by IMA)
- Cryolite
- Cryptomelane
- Cubanite
- Cumengeite
- Cummingtonite
- Cupalite
- Cuprite
- Cuprosklodowskite
- Cuprospinel
- Curite
- Cuspidine
- Cyanotrichite
- Cylindrite
- Cymrite
- Cyrilovite

Varieties that are not valid species:

- Campylite (variety of mimetite)
- Carbonado (variety of diamond)
- Carnelian (variety of quartz)
- Cementite (synthetic cohenite)
- Ceylonite (variety of spinel)
- Chalcedony (cryptocrystalline variety of quartz and moganite)
- Chiastolite (variety of andalusite)
- Chlorastrolite (variety of pumpellyite-(Mg))
- Chrysoprase (green nickel bearing chalcedony)
- Chrysotile (group name - asbestiform serpentine)
- Citrine (yellow variety of quartz)
- Cleveite (variety of uraninite)
- Clinochrysotile (polytype of chrysotile)
- Coltan (short for minerals of the columbite group)
- Cotterite (variety of quartz)
- Crocidolite (asbestiform riebeckite)
- Cymophane (variety of chrysoberyl)

== D ==
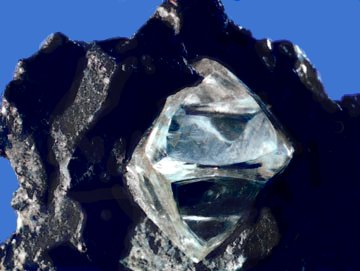
The slightly misshapen octahedral shape of this rough diamond crystal in matrix is typical of the mineral

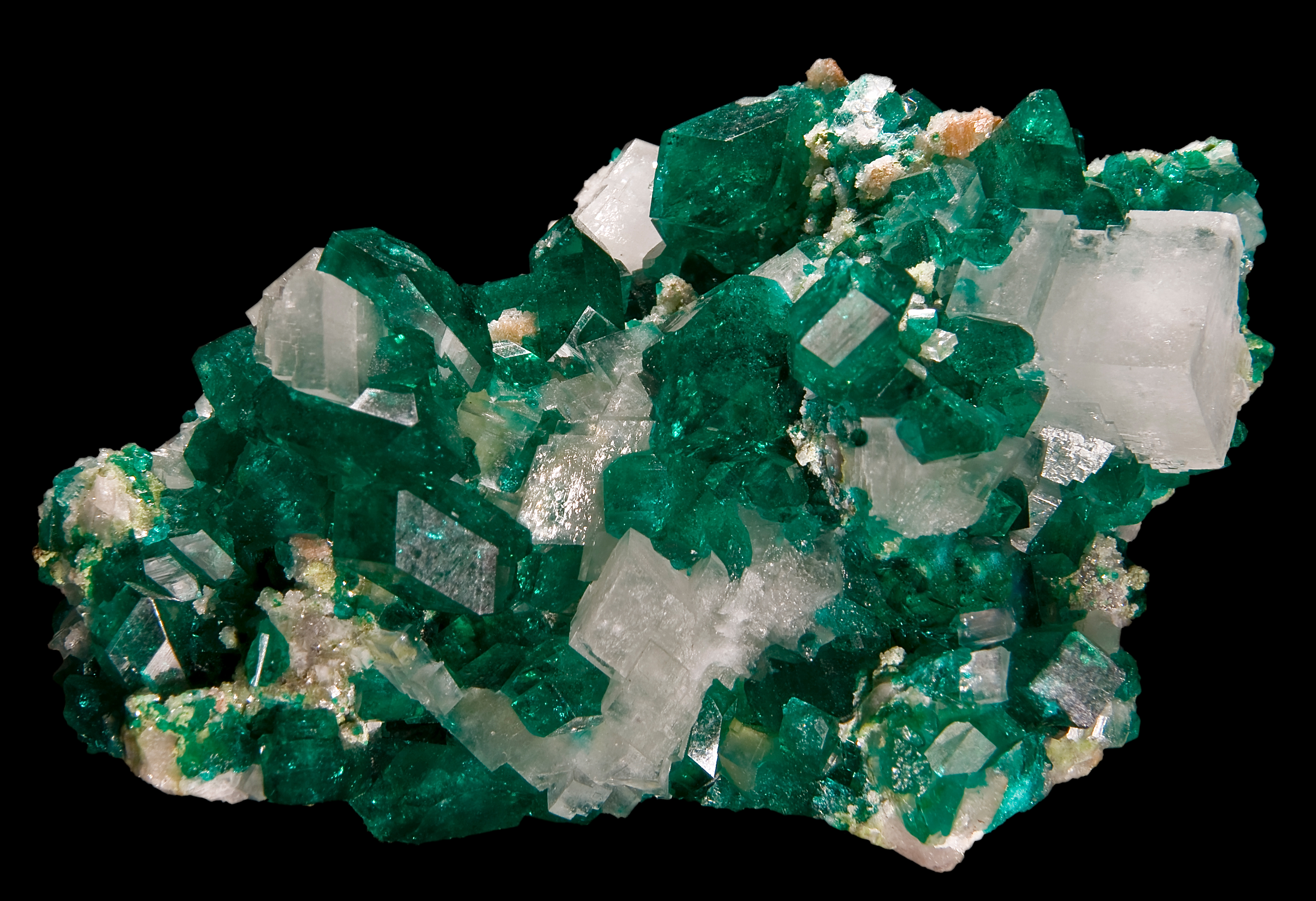
Dioptase from Tsumeb, Namibia

- Danalite
- Danburite
- Datolite
- Daubréeite
- Daubréelite
- Davemaoite
- Davidite
- Davidsmithite
- Dawsonite
- Delafossite
- Delvauxite
- Demesmaekerite
- Derriksite
- Descloizite
- Devilline
- Diaboleite
- Diadochite
- Diamond
- Diaspore
- Dickite
- Digenite
- Dimorphite
- Diopside
- Dioptase
- Djerfisherite
- Djurleite
- Dmitryivanovite
- Dollaseite-(Ce)
- Dolomite
- Domeykite
- Donnayite-(Y)
- Doyleite
- Dresserite
- Drysdallite
- Duftite
- Dumortierite
- Dundasite
- Dypingite
- Dyscrasite
- Dzhalindite

Varieties that are not valid species:

- Delessite (magnesian chamosite)
- Diallage (a junction between augite and diopside)

== E ==
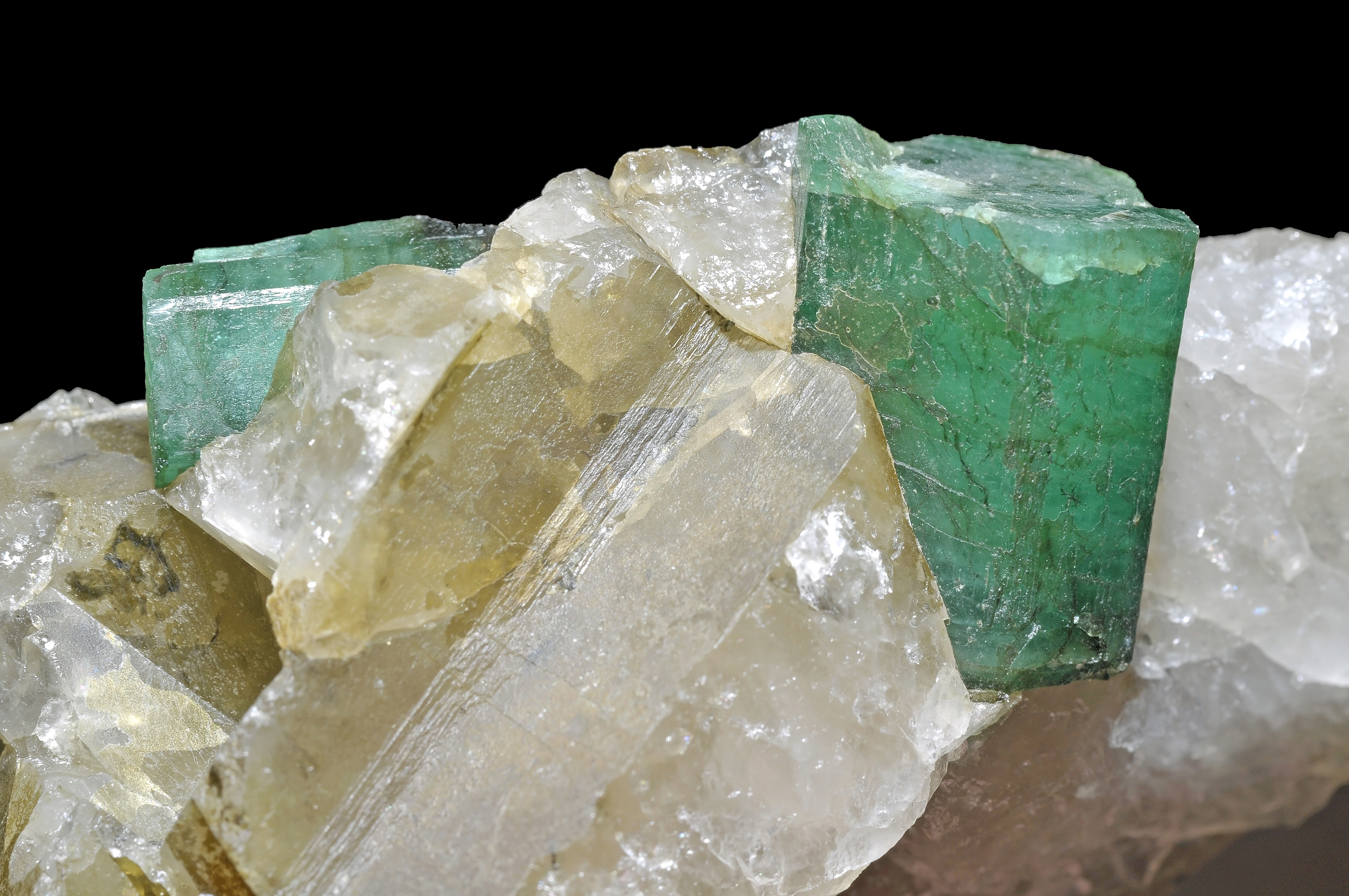
Emerald on quartz, from Carnaiba Mine, Pindobaçu, Campo Formoso ultramafic complex, Bahia, Brazil

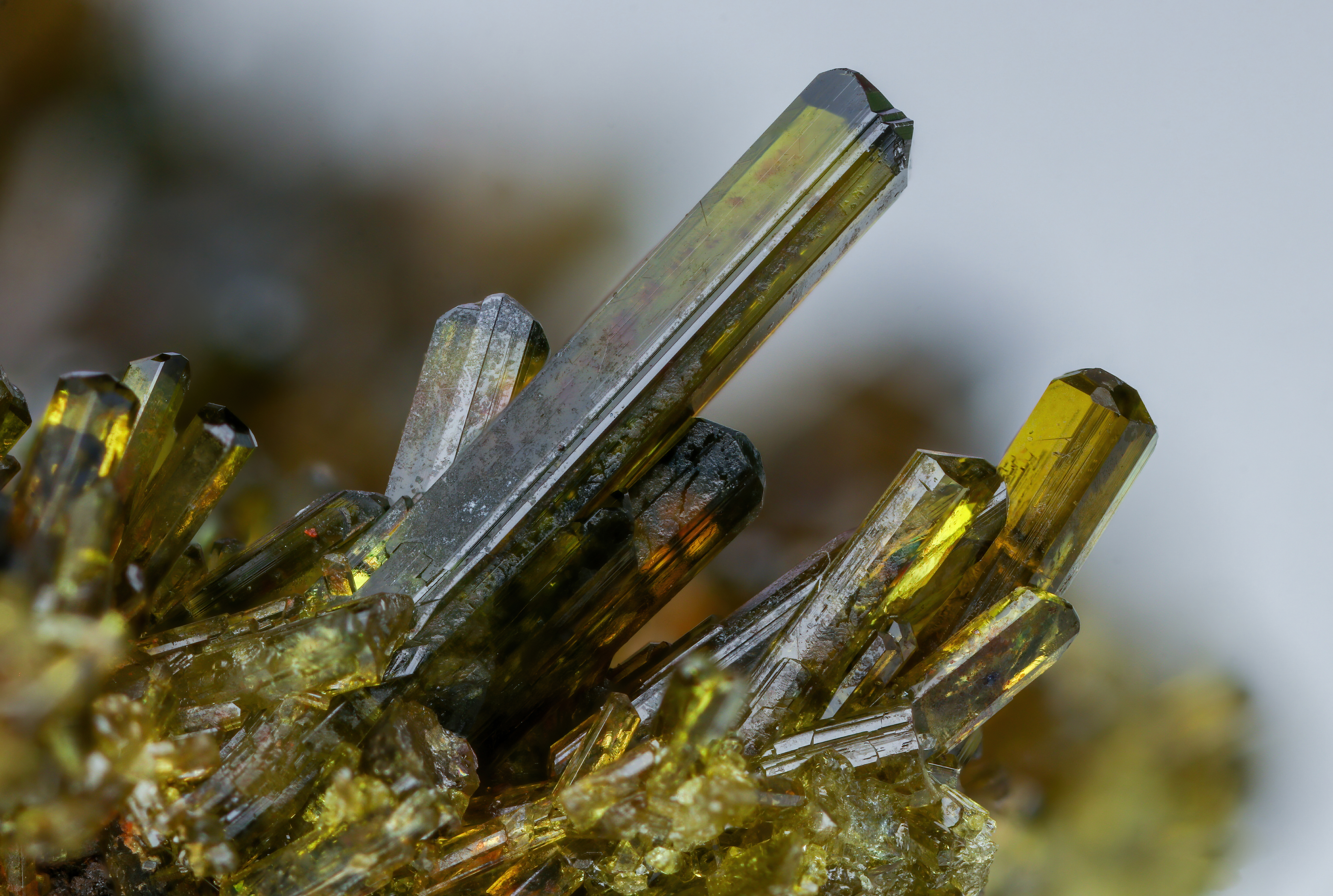
Epidote crystals on matrix mined in Katsna Yama, Pervouralsk, Sverdlovsk Oblast, Russia

- Edenite
- Edingtonite
- Edscottite
- Efremovite
- Ekanite
- Elaliite
- Elbaite (type of multicoloured tourmaline)
- Elkinstantonite
- Emerald (variety of beryl)
- Emmonsite
- Empressite
- Enargite
- Enstatite
- Eosphorite
- Ephesite
- Epidote
- Epsomite
- Ericssonite
- Erionite (series of zeolites)
- Erythrite
- Eskolaite
- Esperite
- Ettringite
- Euchlorine
- Euchroite
- Euclase
- Eucryptite
- Eudialyte
- Eudialyte group
- Euxenite-(Y)
- Eveite
- Evenkite
- Eveslogite

Varieties that are not valid species:

- Elsmoreite (pure hydrokenoelsmoreite)
- Emerald (green gem variety of beryl)

== F ==
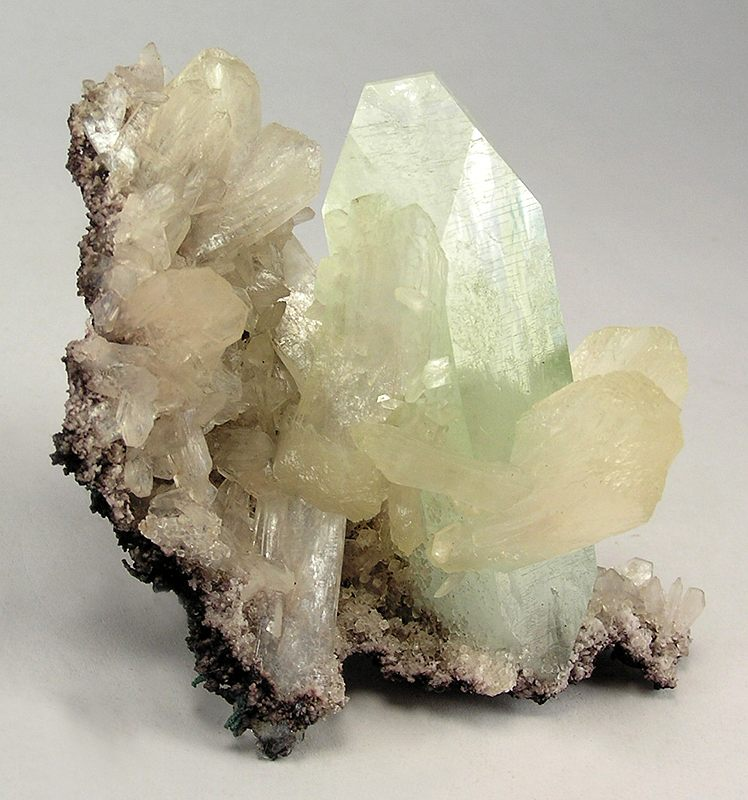
Translucent fluorapophyllit-(K) crystal and stilbite, from Jalgaon District, Maharashtra, India

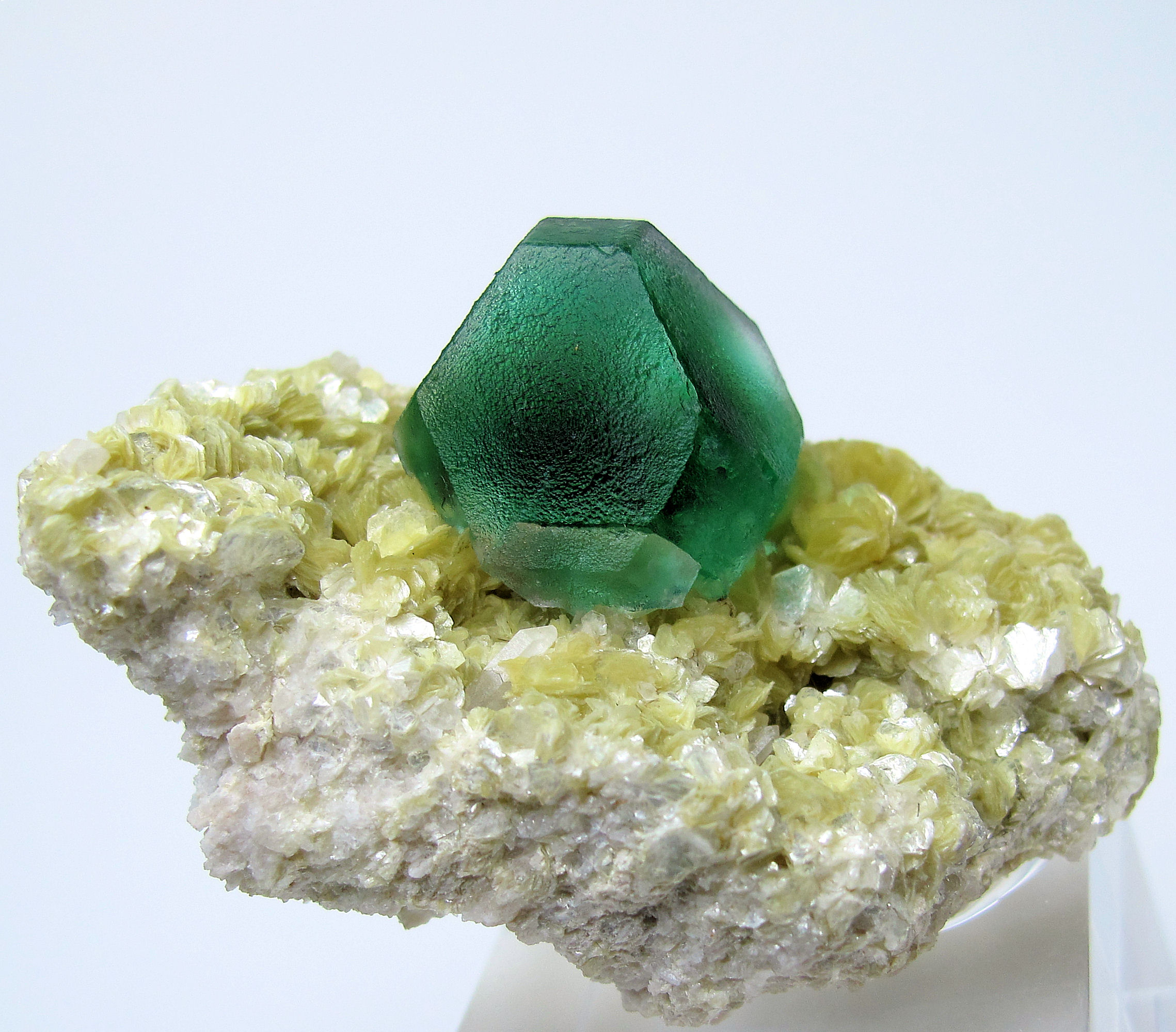
Deep green isolated fluorite crystal showing cubic and octahedral faces, set upon a micaceous matrix

- Fabianite
- Farneseite
- Faujasite (subgroup of zeolites)
- Faustite
- Fayalite (olivine group)
- Feldspar (mineral group)
- Feldspathoid (mineral group)
- Felsőbányaite
- Fengchengite (eudialyte group)
- Ferberite
- Fergusonite (mineral group)
- Feroxyhyte
- Ferrierite (subgroup of zeolite minerals)
- Ferrihydrite
- Ferrimolybdite
- Ferro-actinolite
- Ferrogedrite
- Ferrohortonolite (olivine group)
- Ferronigerite-2N1S
- Ferropericlase
- Ferroselite
- Fettelite
- Fichtelite
- Fingerite
- Fletcherite
- Fluckite
- Fluellite
- Fluoborite
- Fluocerite
- Fluor-buergerite
- Fluor-liddicoatite
- Fluor-uvite
- Fluorapatite (apatite group)
- Fluorapophyllite-(K)
- Fluorcanasite
- Fluorcaphite
- Fluorellestadite
- Fluorite
- Fluororichterite (amphibole group)
- Fontarnauite
- Fornacite
- Forsterite (olivine group)
- Fougèrite (layered double hydroxide)
- Fourmarierite
- Fraipontite
- Francevillite
- Franckeite
- Frankamenite
- Frankdicksonite
- Frankhawthorneite
- Franklinite (spinel group)
- Franklinphilite
- Freibergite
- Freieslebenite
- Fukuchilite

Varieties that are not valid species:

- Fassaite (variety of augite)
- Ferrocolumbite (synonym of columbite-(Fe))
- Ferrotantalite (synonym of tantalite-(Fe))
- Fluorspar (synonym of fluorite)
- Francolite (variety of fluorapatite)

== G ==
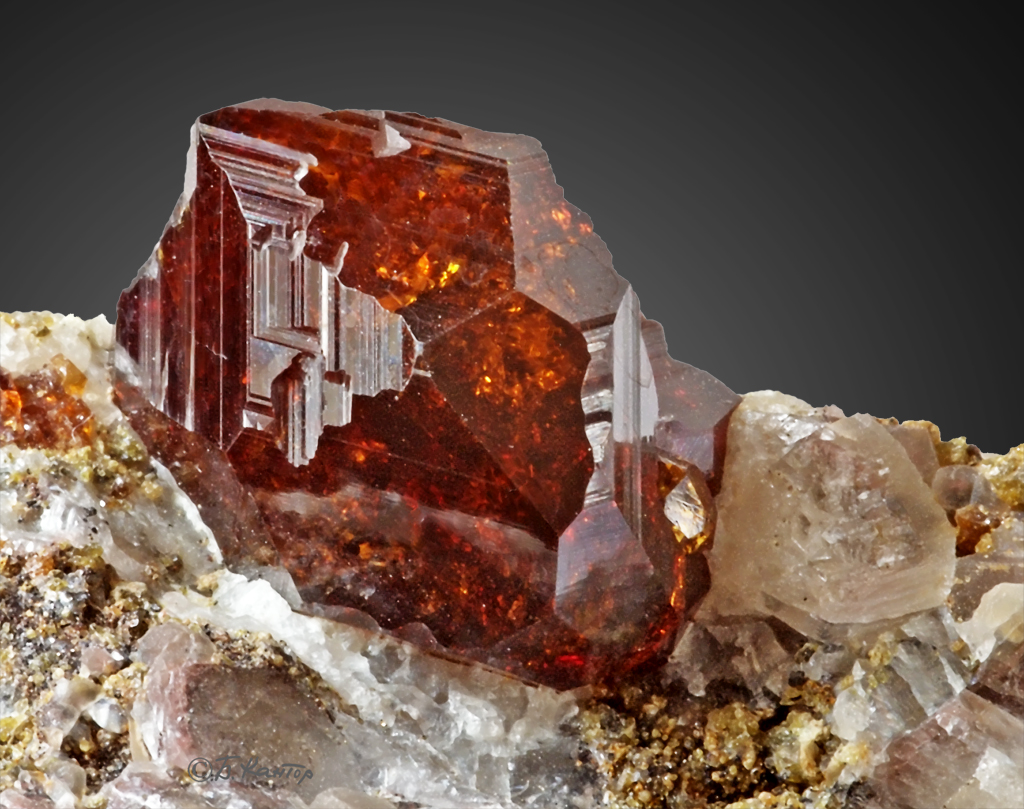
Garnet

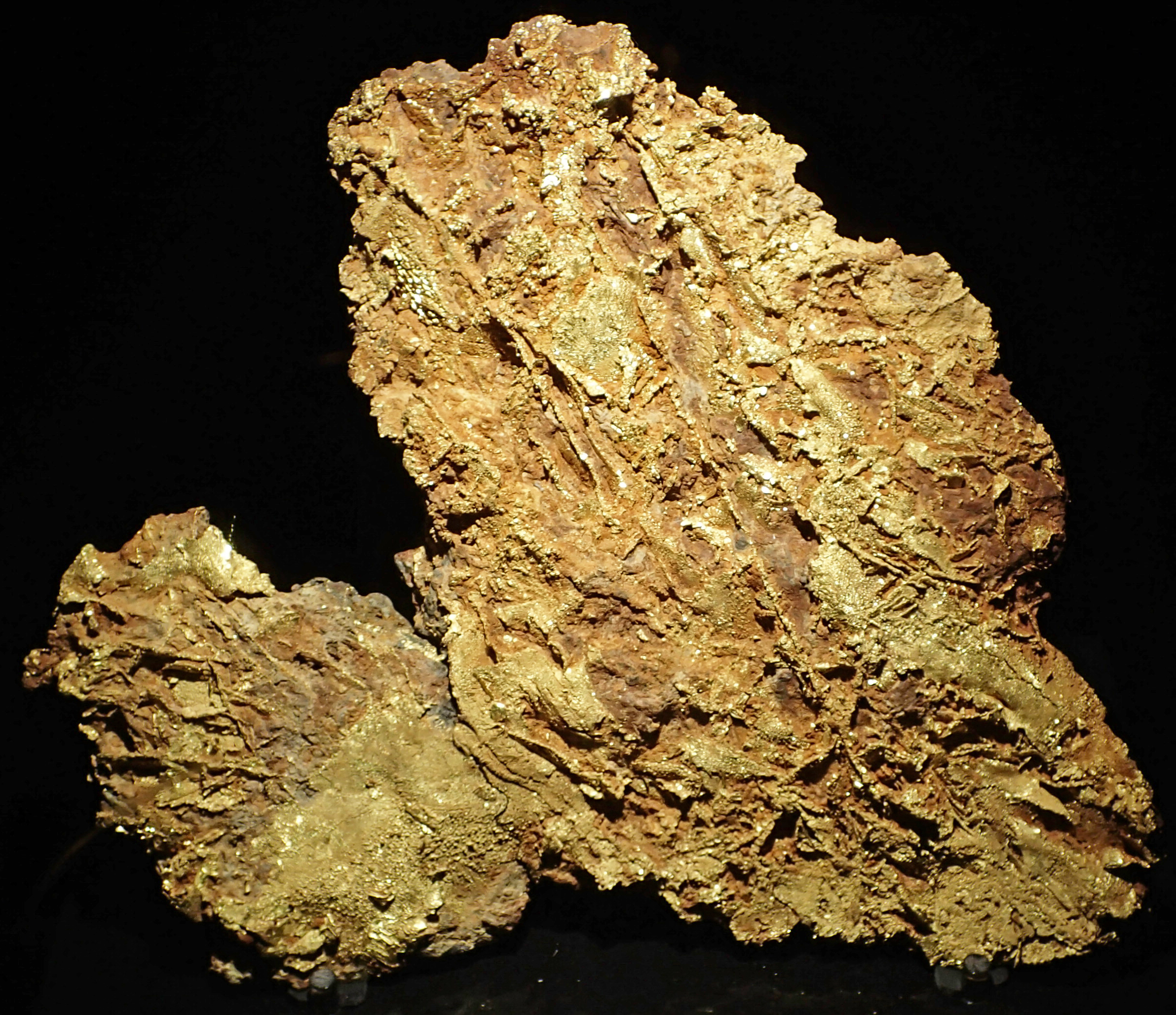
Gold vein stockwork in limonite, from Gold Flake Vein, Farncomb Hill, Breckenridge Mining District, Summit County, Colorado, USA

- Gabrielite
- Gadolinite (mineral group)
- Gagarinite-(Ce)
- Gahnite
- Galaxite
- Galena
- Galkhaite
- Gananite
- Ganophyllite
- Garnet (mineral group)
- Gaspeite
- Gatehouseite
- Gaylussite
- Gedrite
- Geerite
- Gehlenite
- Geigerite
- Geikielite
- Gembone
- Geocronite
- Georgerobinsonite
- Germanite
- Gersdorffite
- Getchellite
- Gibbsite
- Gilalite
- Gismondine
- Glauberite
- Glaucochroite
- Glaucodot
- Glauconite
- Glaucophane
- Gmelinite
- Godovikovite
- Goethite
- Gold
- Goldmanite
- Gonnardite
- Gordaite
- Gormanite
- Goslarite
- Graftonite
- Grandidierite
- Grandreefite
- Graphite
- Gratonite
- Greenalite
- Greenockite
- Gregoryite
- Greifensteinite
- Greigite
- Grossite
- Grossular
- Groutite
- Grunerite
- Guettardite
- Gugiaite
- Guilleminite
- Gunningite
- Guyanaite
- Gwihabaite
- Gypsum
- Gyrolite

Varieties that are not valid species:

- Garnierite (a nickel ore)
- Goshenite (colorless variety of beryl)

== H ==
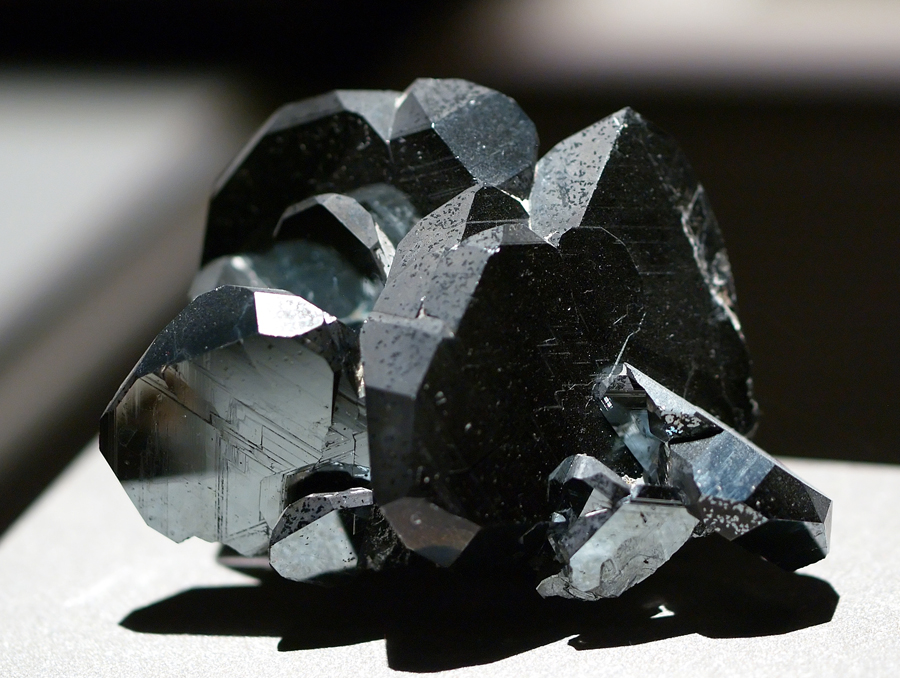
Brazilian trigonal hematite crystals

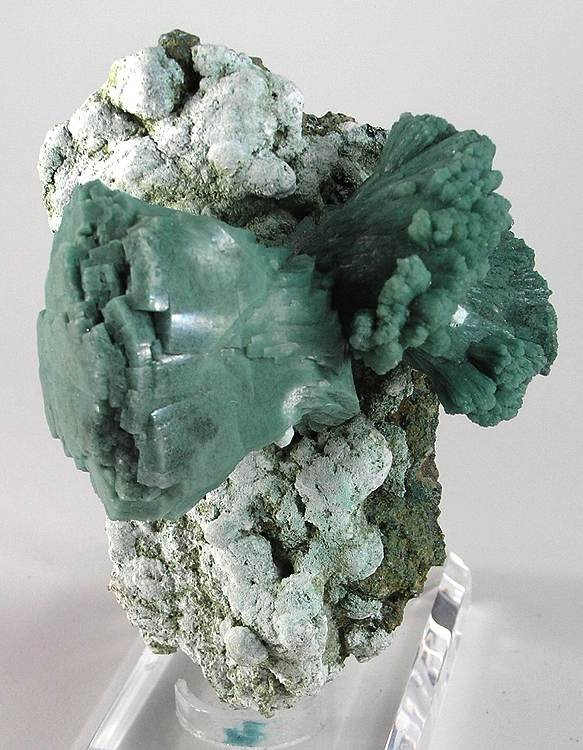
Heulandite and Celadonite, Aurangabad District, Maharashtra, India

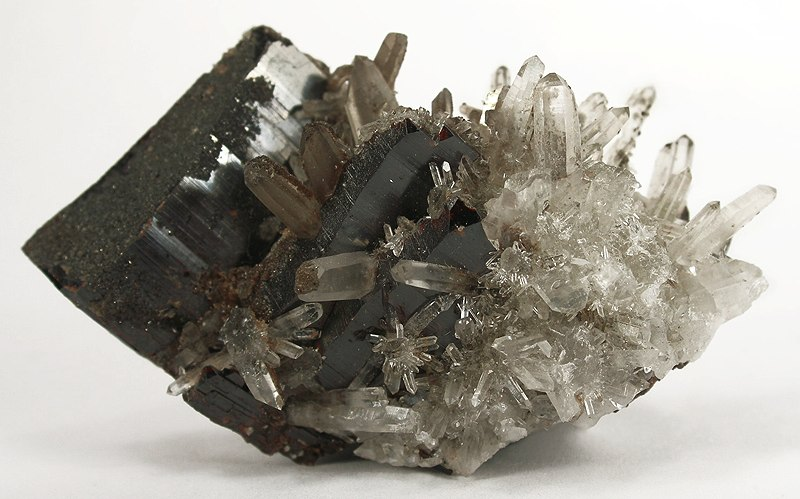
Hübnerite and quartz

- Hafnon
- Hagendorfite
- Haggertyite
- Haidingerite
- Haiweeite
- Håleniusite-(La)
- Halite
- Halloysite
- Halotrichite
- Hambergite
- Hanksite
- Hapkeite
- Hardystonite
- Harmotome
- Hauerite
- Hausmannite
- Hauyne
- Hawleyite
- Haxonite
- Hazenite
- Heazlewoodite
- Hectorite
- Hedenbergite
- Hellyerite
- Hematite
- Hemihedrite
- Hemimorphite
- Hemusite
- Hendricksite
- Heptasartorite
- Herbertsmithite
- Hercynite
- Herderite
- Hermannjahnite
- Hessite
- Heulandite (series of zeolites)
- Hexaferrum
- Hiärneite
- Hibonite
- Hidalgoite
- Hilgardite
- Hisingerite
- Hodgkinsonite
- Hoelite
- Hollandite
- Holmquistite
- Homilite
- Hopeite
- Hornblende (series of amphiboles)
- Howlite
- Hsianghualite
- Hubeite
- Hübnerite
- Huemulite
- Humite
- Huntite
- Hureaulite
- Hutchinsonite
- Huttonite
- Hydroboracite
- Hydrogrossular (series of garnets)
- Hydrohalite
- Hydrokenoelsmoreite
- Hydromagnesite
- Hydrotalcite
- Hydroxylapatite
- Hydrozincite

Varieties that are not valid species:

- Hatchettite (a paraffin wax)
- Heliodor (greenish-yellow variety of beryl)
- Heliotrope (variety of chalcedony)
- Hessonite (variety of grossular)
- Hiddenite (variety of spodumene)
- Hyalite (variety of opal)
- Hyalophane (synonym of jaloallofane)
- Hypersthene (synonym of enstatite or ferrosilite, or mid-way member of the enstatite–ferrosilite series) (not approved by IMA)

== I ==
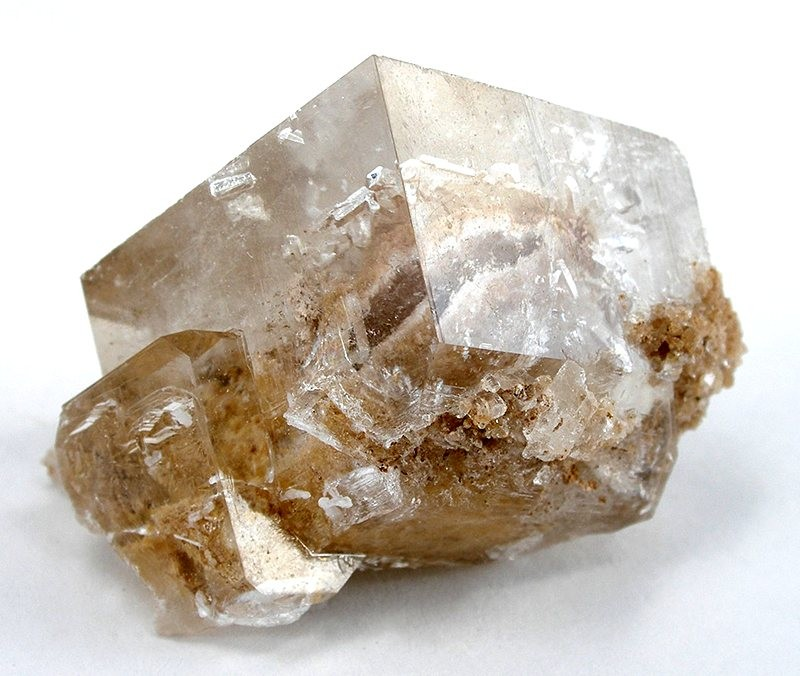
Inyoite from Monte Azul deposit, Sijes, Salta, Argentina

- Ianbruceite
- Ice
- Ichnusaite
- Icosahedrite
- Idrialite
- Ikaite
- Illite
- Ilmenite
- Ilsemannite
- Ilvaite
- Imogolite
- Inderite
- Indite
- Inesite
- Inyoite
- Iodargyrite
- Iranite
- Iridium
- Native iron
- Ixiolite

Varieties that are not valid species:

- Idocrase (synonym of vesuvianite)
- Iolite (a gem-quality variety of cordierite)

== J ==
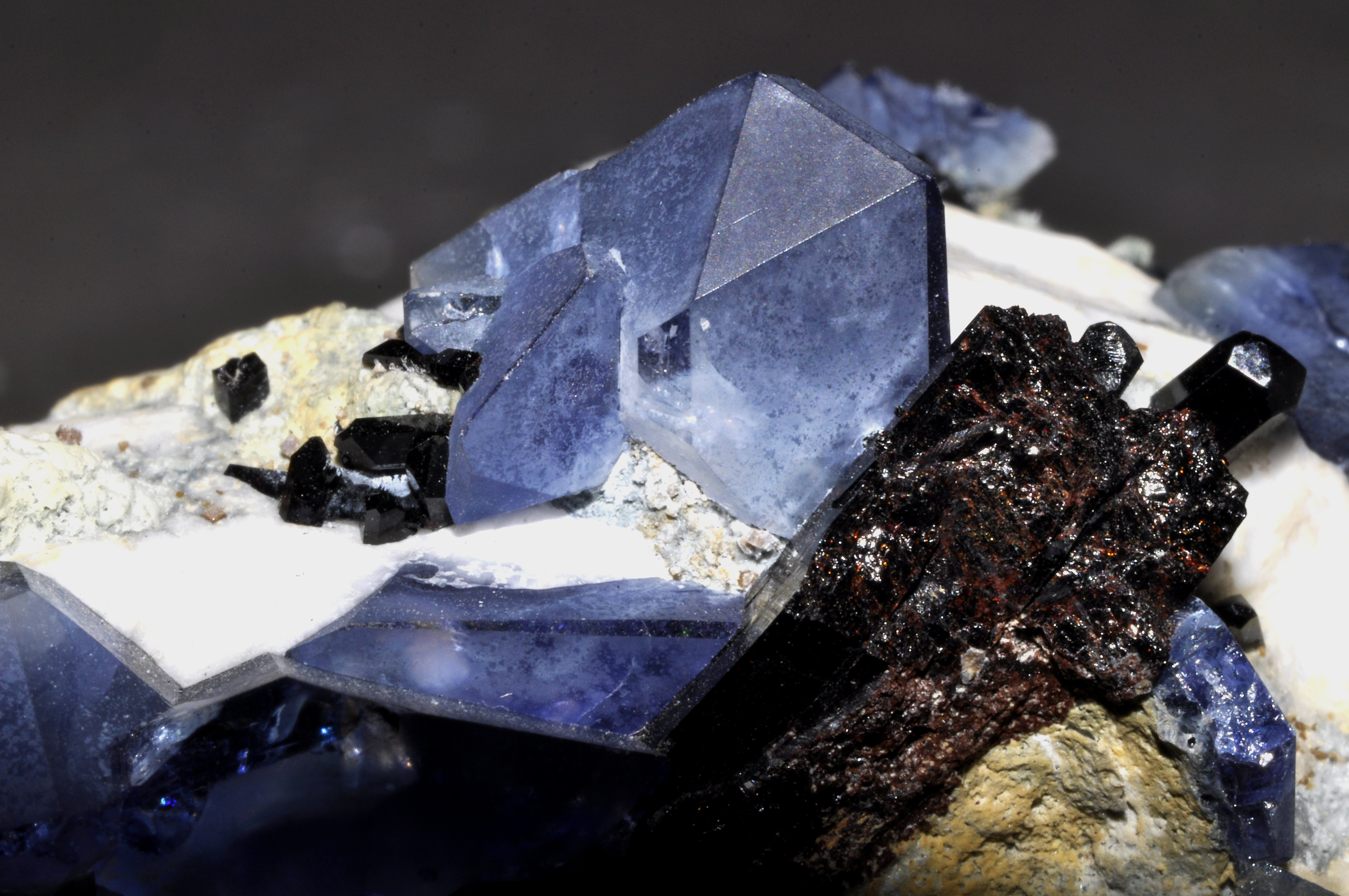
Benitoite (blue), joaquinite-(Ce) (brown) and neptunite (dark red) on natrolite (white), from Dallas Gem Mine area, San Benito River headwaters area, New Idria District, Diablo Range, San Benito Co., California, USA

- Jacobsite
- Jadarite
- Jadeite
- Jaffeite
- Jalpaite
- Jamesonite
- Janggunite
- Jarosewichite
- Jarosite
- Jennite
- Jeremejevite
- Jerrygibbsite
- Jimthompsonite
- Jinshajiangite
- Johannite
- Johannsenite
- Jôkokuite
- Jolliffeite
- Jonesite
- Jordanite
- Julgoldite
- Junitoite
- Jurbanite

Varieties that are not valid species:

- Jade (tough, green mineral either jadeite or nephrite amphibole)
- Jasper (variety of quartz)
- Jeffersonite (variety of augite)

== K ==
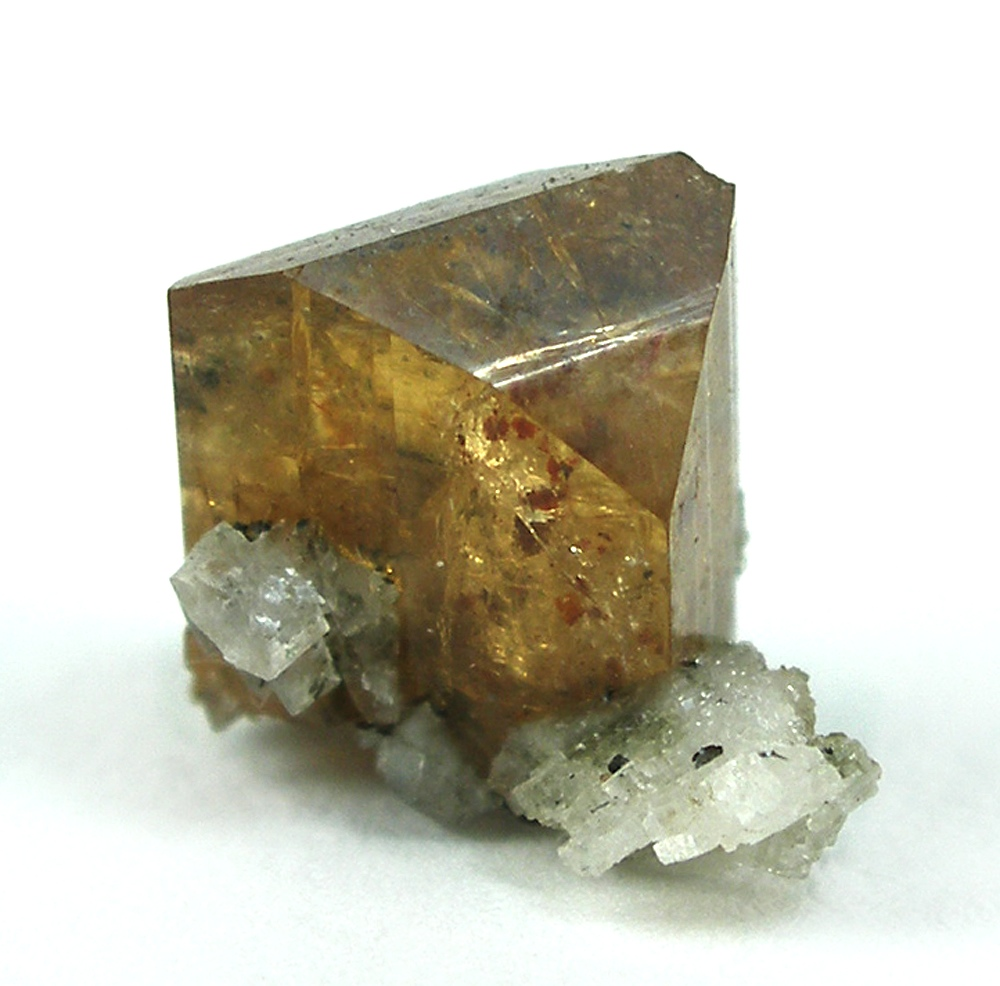
Kainosite-(Y) from the Amphibolite quarry, Haslach, Black Forest, Baden-Württemberg, Germany

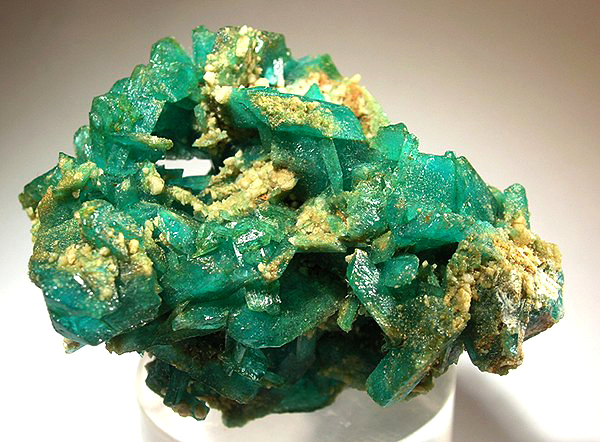
Kröhnkite from Cuquicamata Mine, Chuquicamata District, Calama, El Loa Province, Antofagasta Region, Chile

- Kaatialaite
- Kadyrelite
- Kaersutite
- Kainite
- Kainosite-(Y)
- Kalinite
- Kalsilite
- Kamacite
- Kambaldaite
- Kamiokite
- Kampfite
- Kaňkite
- Kanoite
- Kaolinite
- Karlite
- Kasolite
- Kassite
- Katayamalite
- Kazakovite
- Kegelite
- Keilite
- Kenhsuite
- Kermesite
- Kernite
- Kesterite
- Keyite
- Khatyrkite
- Kidwellite
- Kieserite
- Kinoite
- Kleinite
- Knebelite
- Knorringite
- Kobellite
- Kochite
- Kogarkoite
- Kolbeckite
- Kornerupine
- Kosmochlor
- Kostovite
- Köttigite
- Kovdorskite
- Kratochvílite
- Kremersite
- Krennerite
- Krieselite
- Kröhnkite
- Krotite
- Kruťaite
- Krutovite
- Kukharenkoite-(Ce)
- Kuratite
- Kurnakovite
- Kutnohorite
- Kyanite
- Kyawthuite

Varieties that are not valid species:

- Keilhauite (variety of titanite)
- Kerolite (variety of talc)
- Krantzite (natural resin)
- Kunzite (variety of spodumene)

== L ==
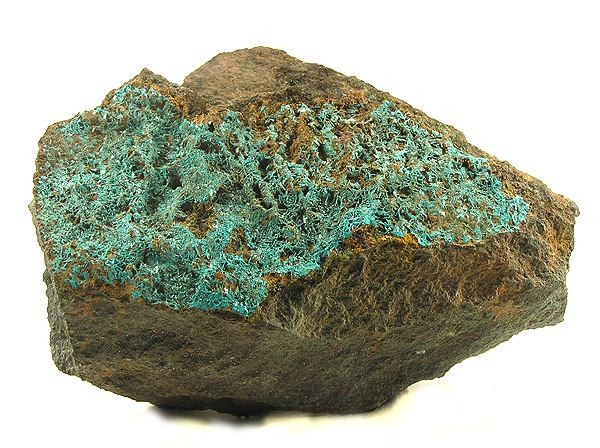
Langite from Alsace, France

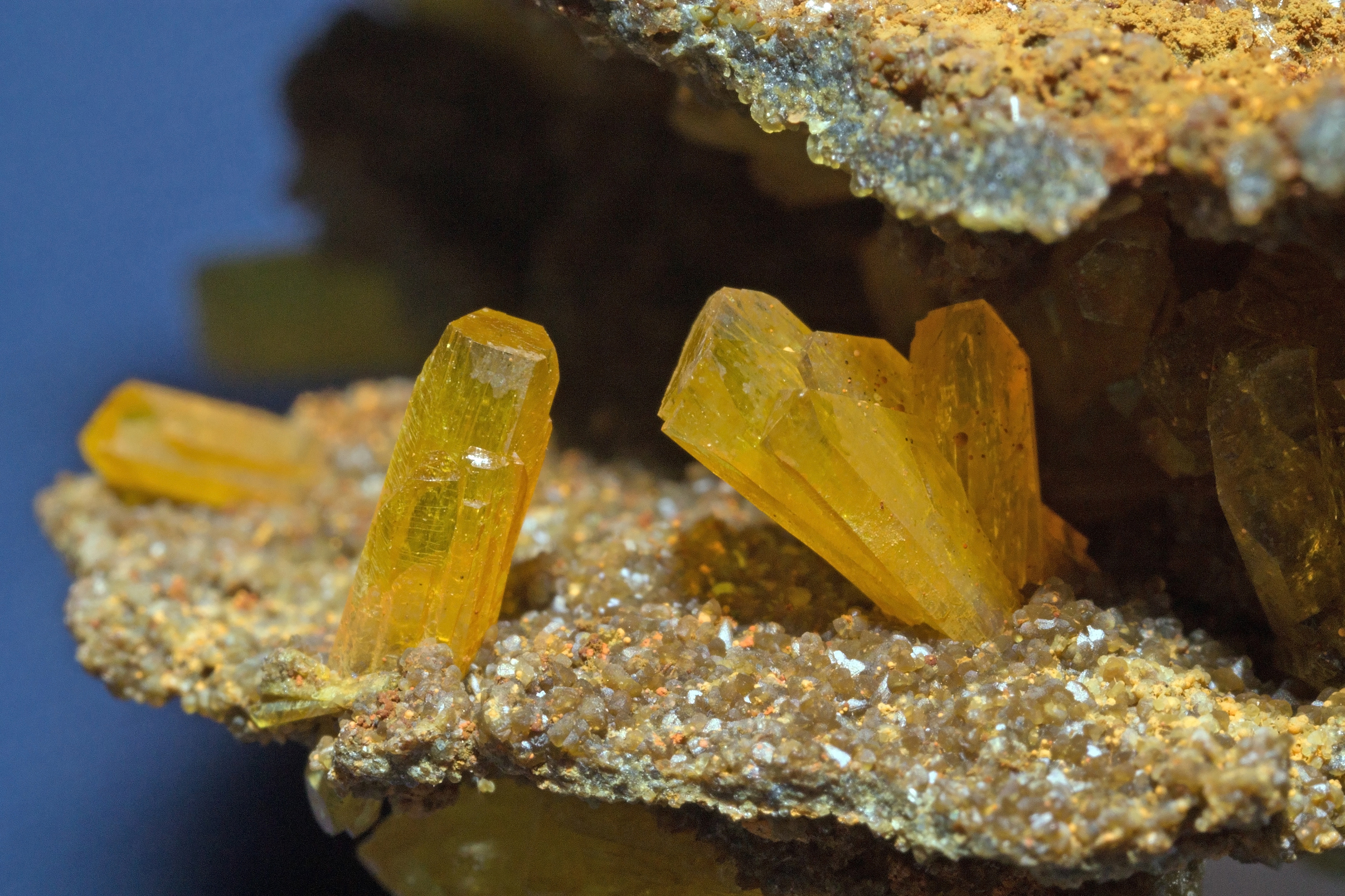
Legrandite on limonite

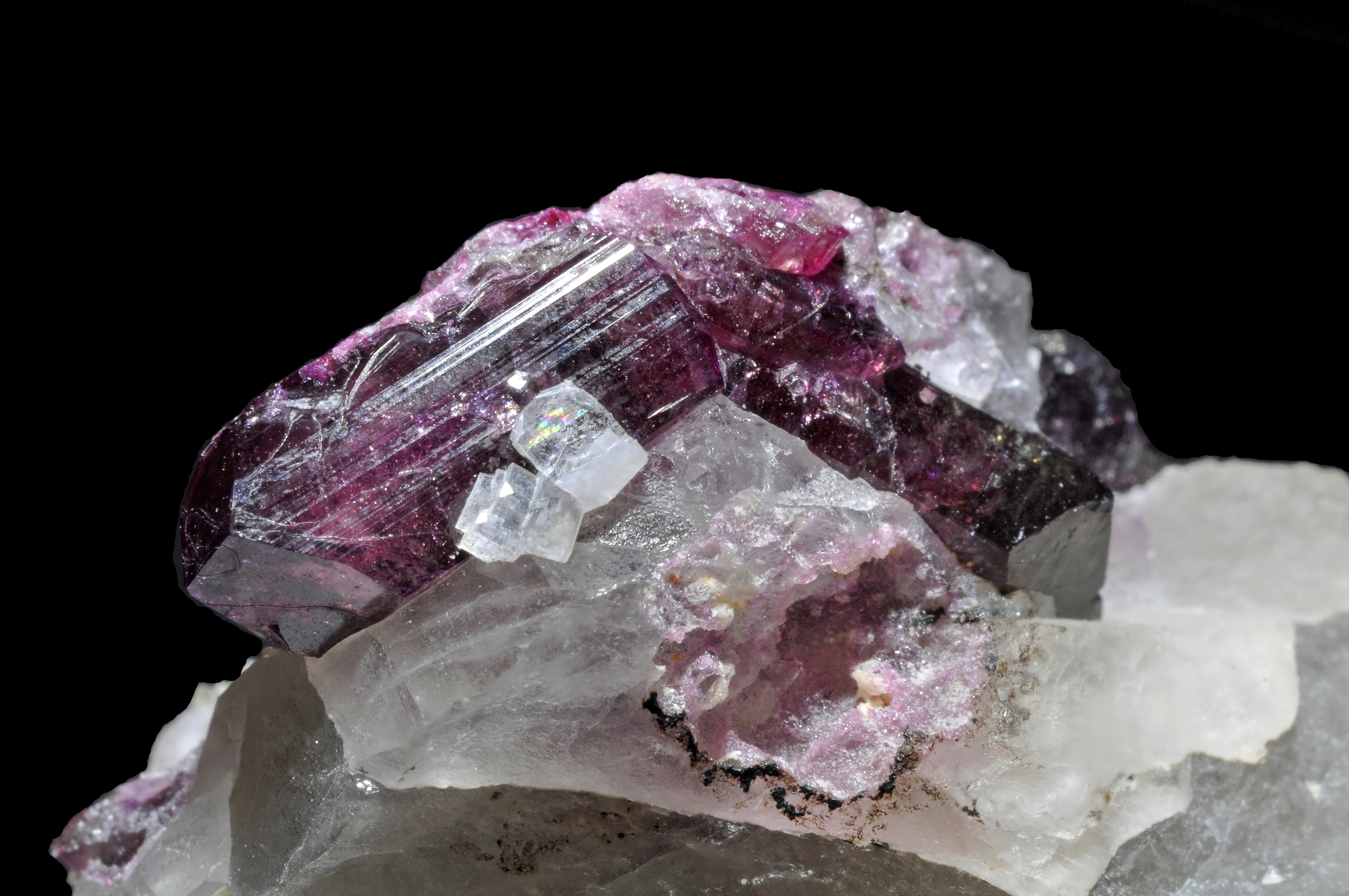
Liddicoatite on quartz and feldspar

- Labradorite
- Labyrinthite
- Lanarkite
- Langbeinite
- Langite
- Lansfordite
- Lanthanite (group of rare earth carbonates)
- Laplandite-(Ce)
- Larnite
- Laumontite
- Laurionite
- Laurite
- Lautenthalite
- Lautite
- Lavendulan
- Lawsonite
- Lazulite
- Lazurite
- Leadhillite
- Legrandite
- Leifite
- Leightonite
- Lepidocrocite
- Lepidolite
- Letovicite
- Leucite
- Leucophanite
- Leucophoenicite
- Lévyne (series of zeolites)
- Libethenite
- Liebigite
- Limestone
- Linarite
- Lindgrenite
- Linnaeite
- Lipscombite
- Liroconite
- Litharge
- Lithiophilite
- Livingstonite
- Lizardite
- Loellingite
- Lonsdaleite
- Loparite-(Ce)
- Lópezite
- Lorándite
- Lorenzenite
- Loveringite
- Ludlamite
- Ludwigite
- Lulzacite
- Lyonsite

Varieties that are not valid species:

- Lapis lazuli is a metamorphic rock, used as a semi-precious stone
- Larimar (blue variety of pectolite)
- Lodestone (a synonym of magnetite)
- Lublinite (variety of calcite)

== M ==
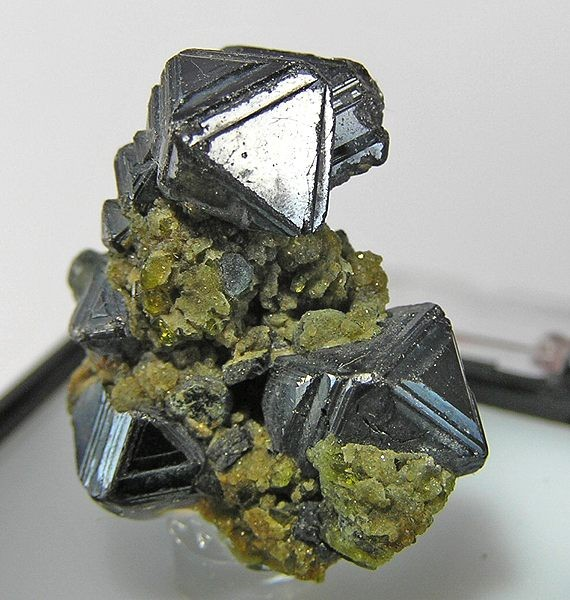
Magnetite from Speen Ghar, Nangarhar Province, Afghanistan

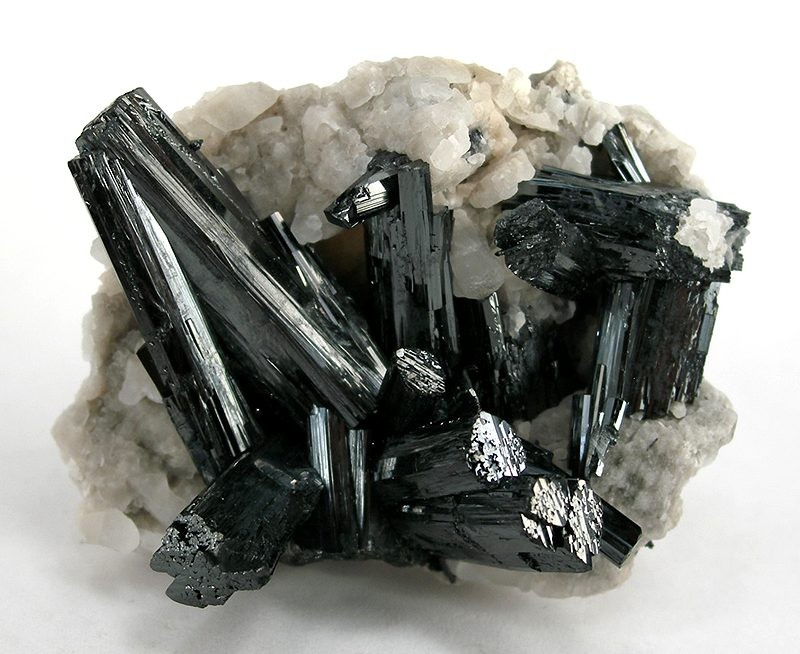
Manganite from Ilfeld, Thuringia, Germany

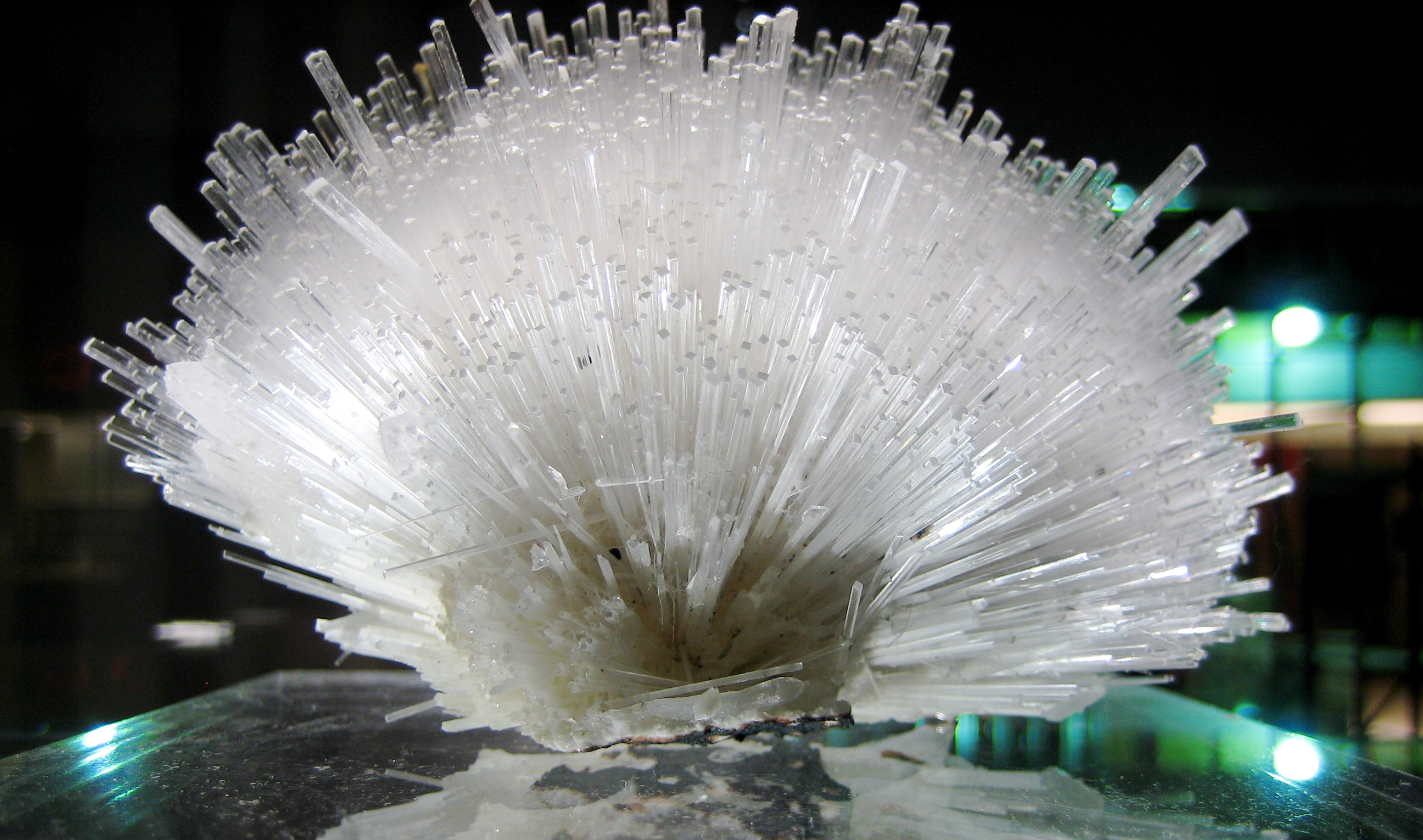
Mesolite at the Carnegie Museum of Natural History, Pittsburgh, Pennsylvania, USA

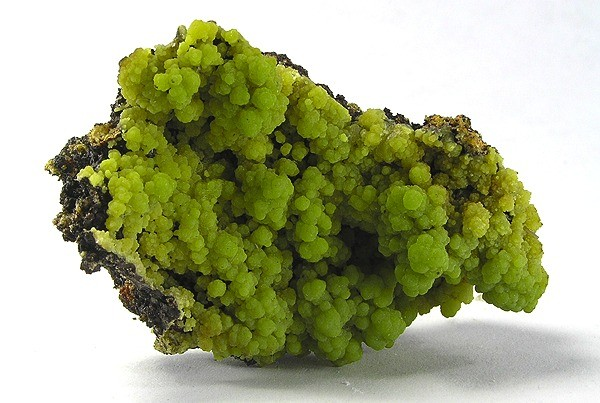
Mimetite on limonite matrix

- Macaulayite
- Macdonaldite
- Mackinawite
- Madocite
- Magadiite
- Maghemite
- Magnesioferrite
- Magnesiohastingsite
- Magnesiopascoite
- Magnesite
- Magnetite
- Majorite
- Malachite
- Malayaite
- Manganite
- Manganophyllite
- Manganosite
- Manganvesuvianite
- Mansfieldite
- Marcasite
- Margaritasite
- Margarite
- Marialite
- Maricite
- Marrite
- Marthozite
- Mascagnite
- Massicot
- Masuyite
- Mathesiusite
- Matlockite
- Maucherite
- Mawsonite
- Mckelveyite-(Y)
- Meionite
- Melanophlogite
- Melanterite
- Melilite
- Mellite
- Melonite
- Mendipite
- Mendozite
- Meneghinite
- Mereheadite
- Merenskyite
- Meridianiite
- Merrillite
- Mesolite
- Messelite
- Metacinnabar
- Metatorbernite
- Metazeunerite
- Meyerhofferite
- Miargyrite
- Mica (a group of silicate minerals)
- Microcline
- Microlite
- Miguelromeroite
- Millerite
- Millosevichite
- Mimetite
- Minium
- Minnesotaite
- Minyulite
- Mirabilite
- Mixite
- Moganite
- Mohite
- Mohrite
- Moissanite
- Molybdenite
- Molybdite
- Monazite
- Monohydrocalcite
- Monticellite
- Montmorillonite (clay mineral)
- Mooihoekite
- Moolooite
- Mordenite
- Moschellandsbergite
- Mosesite
- Mottramite
- Motukoreaite
- Mullite
- Mundite
- Murdochite
- Muscovite
- Musgravite (magnesiotaaffeite-6N'3S)

Varieties that are not valid species:

- Magnesia
- Magnesiocummingtonite (magnesium-rich variety of cummingtonite)
- Malacolite (synonym of diopside)
- Manganocolumbite (synonym of columbite-(Mn))
- Manganotantalite (synonym of tantalite-(Mn))
- Mariposite (variety of phengite/muscovite)
- Meerschaum (variety of sepiolite)
- Melanite (variety of andradite)
- Menilite (variety of opal)
- Milky quartz (a cloudy white quartz)
- Morganite (a pink beryl)

== N ==
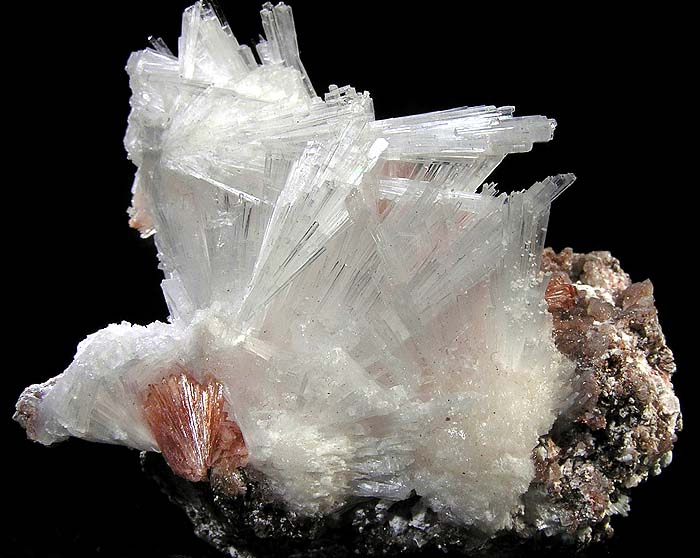
Needles of natrolite on deep pink inesite

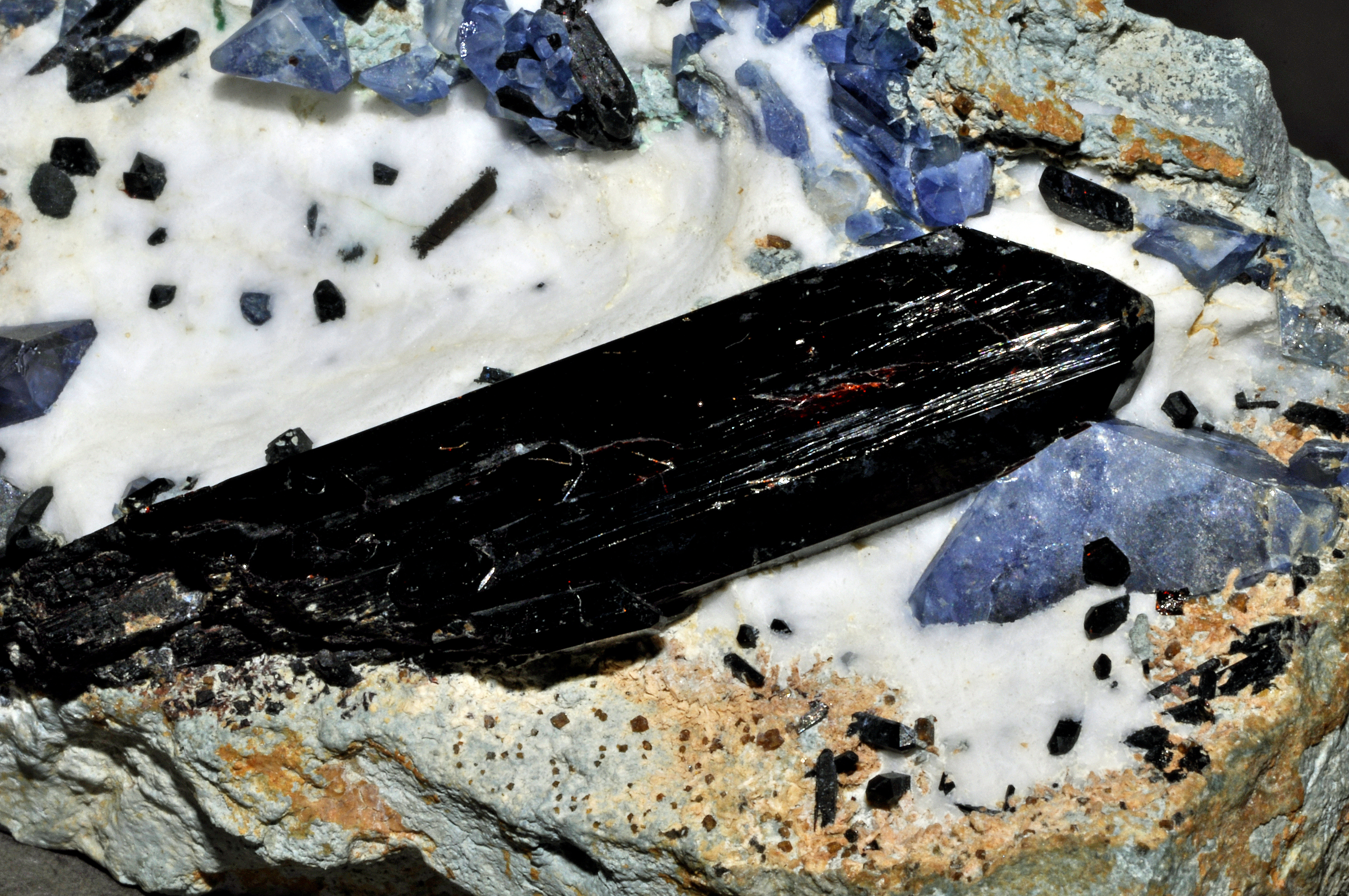
Neptunite from California, USA

- Nabalamprophyllite
- Nabesite
- Nacrite
- Nadorite
- Nagyágite
- Nahcolite
- Naldrettite
- Nambulite
- Narsarsukite
- Natrolite
- Natron
- Natrophilite
- Nekrasovite
- Nelenite
- Nenadkevichite
- Nepheline
- Népouite
- Neptunite
- Nichromite
- Nickel (as meteoric nickel-iron)
- Nickeline
- Niedermayrite
- Niningerite
- Nissonite
- Niter
- Nitratine
- Nobleite
- Nontronite
- Norbergite
- Normandite
- Northupite
- Nosean
- Nsutite
- Nuragheite
- Nyerereite

Varieties that are not valid species:

- Nephrite (variety of tremolite/actinolite)
- Niobite (synonym of columbite)
- Niobite-tantalite (synonym of columbite-tantalite)

== O ==
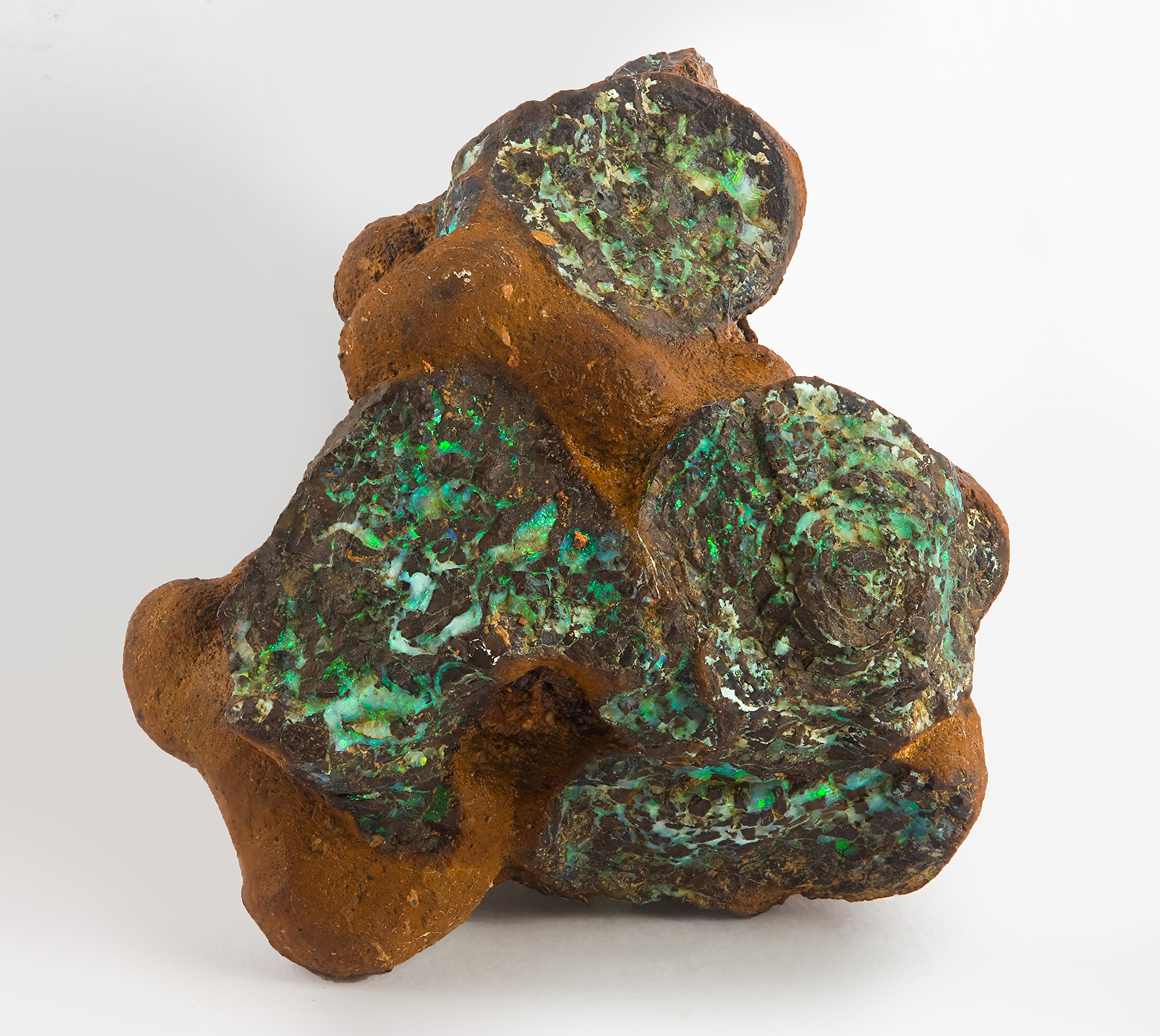
Boulder opal, Carisbrooke Station near Winton, Queensland, Australia

- Obsidian ( several types )
- Okenite
- Oldhamite
- Olgite
- Olivenite
- Olivine (a group of silicate minerals)
- Olmiite
- Omphacite
- Oneillite
- Oosterboschite
- Oppenheimerite
- Ordóñezite
- Oregonite
- Orpiment
- Orthoclase
- Osarizawaite
- Osmium (often as osmiridium)
- Osumilite
- Otavite
- Ottrelite
- Otwayite

Varieties that are not valid species:

- Oligoclase (a mixture of albite and anorthite)
- Onyx (a monochromatic banded variety of chalcedony)
- Opal (a mineraloid. Colored variety used as a gemstone)
- Opalite
- Orthochrysotile (a polytype of chrysotile)

== P ==
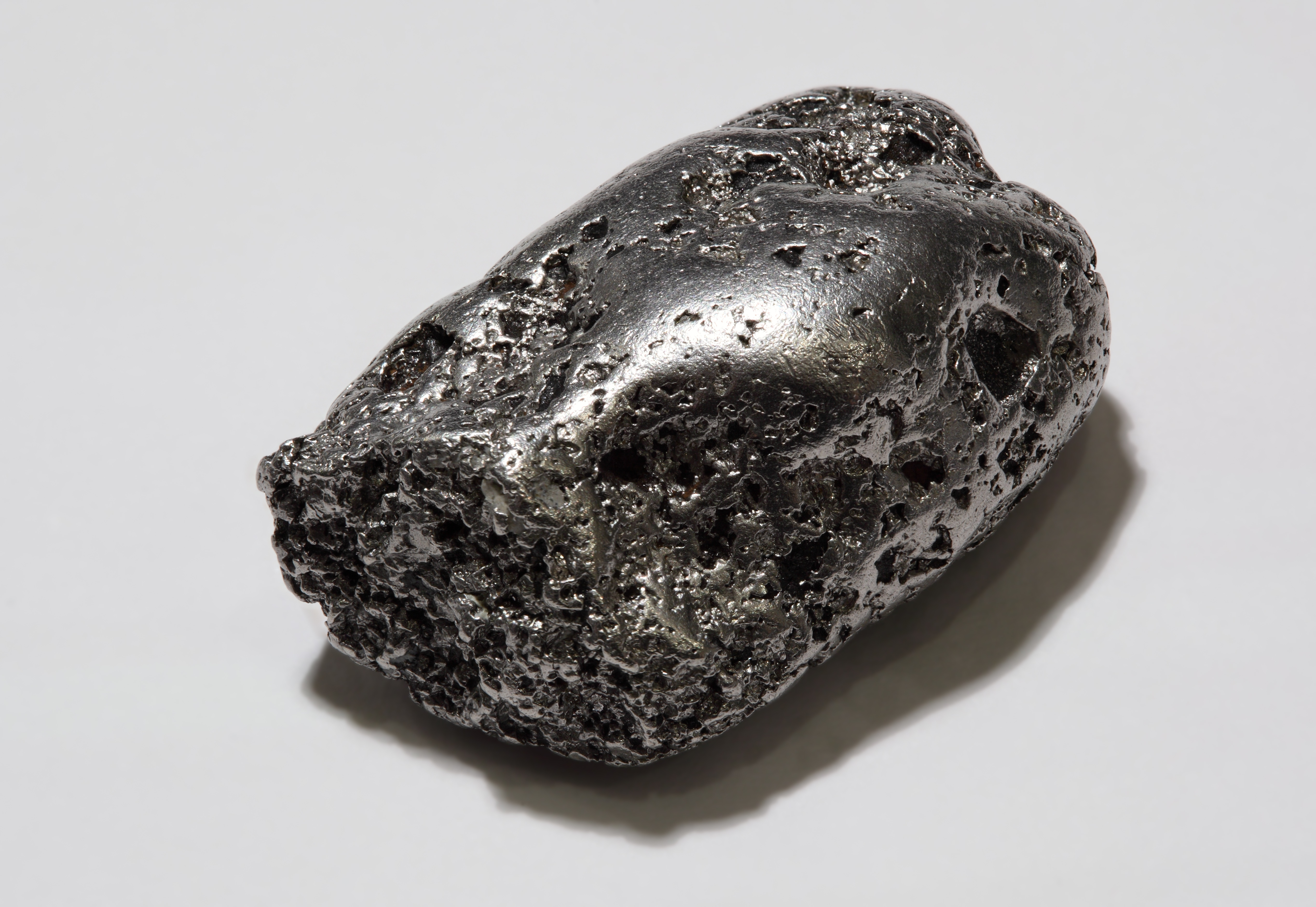
A native Platinum nugget from the Kondyor mine, Khabarovsk Krai, Russia.

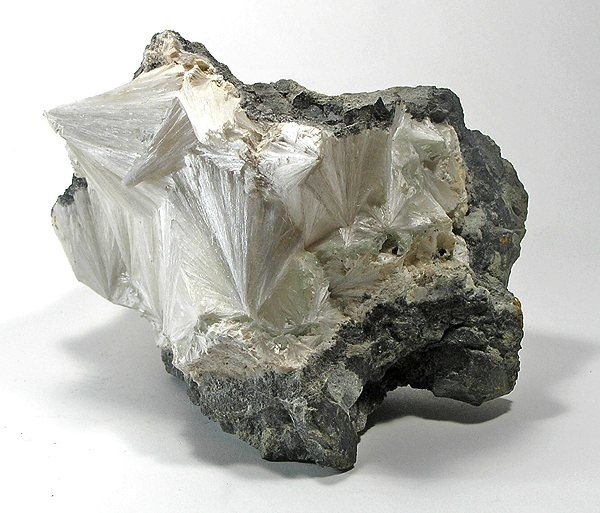
Pectolite from Paterson, Passaic County, New Jersey, USA

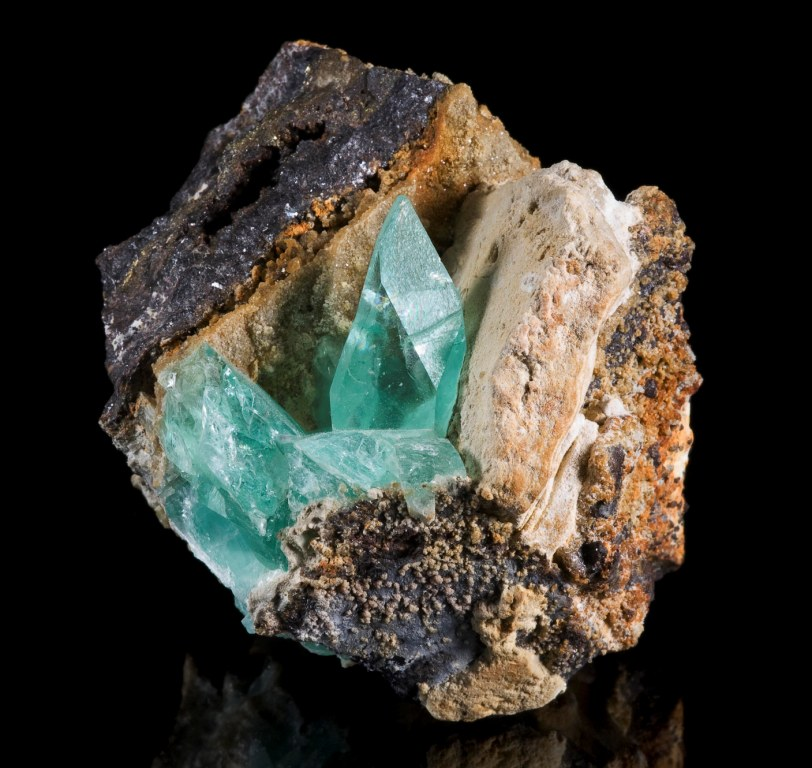
Phosphophyllite from Cerro de Potosí, Potosí Department, Bolivia

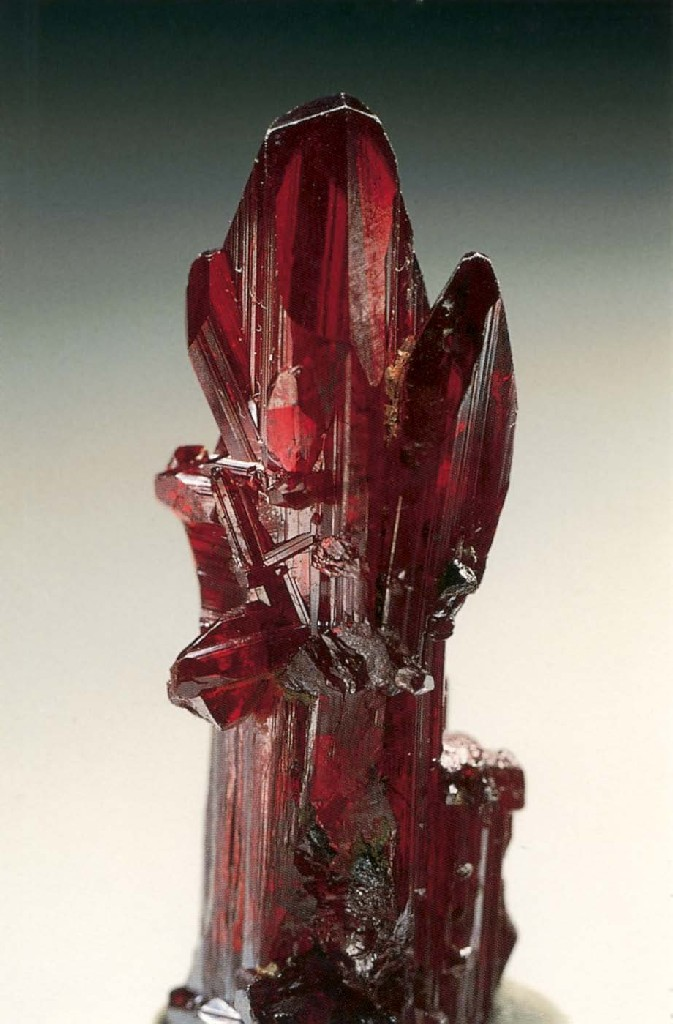
Proustite from Chanarcillo, Copiapo Province, Chile

- Pääkkönenite
- Pabstite
- Painite
- Palladium (as an alloy with gold or other PGMs)
- Palygorskite
- Panethite
- Panguite
- Papagoite
- Paragonite
- Paralaurionite
- Paramelaconite
- Pararealgar
- Paravauxite
- Pargasite
- Parisite-(Ce)
- Parsonsite
- Parthéite
- Pascoite
- Patrónite
- Paulingite (series of zeolites)
- Paulscherrerite
- Pearceite
- Pecoraite
- Pectolite
- Penfieldite
- Penikisite
- Penroseite
- Pentagonite
- Pentlandite
- Perhamite
- Periclase
- Perite
- Perovskite
- Petalite
- Petrovite
- Petzite
- Pezzottaite
- Pharmacolite
- Pharmacosiderite
- Phenakite
- Phillipsite (series of zeolites)
- Phlogopite
- Phoenicochroite
- Phosgenite
- Phosphophyllite
- Phosphosiderite
- Phosphuranylite
- Pickeringite
- Picropharmacolite
- Piemontite
- Pigeonite
- Pinalite
- Pinnoite
- Piypite
- Plagioclase Na-Ca feldspar series
- Plancheite
- Platinum
- Plattnerite
- Playfairite
- Plumbogummite
- Polarite
- Pollucite
- Polybasite
- Polycrase
- Polydymite
- Polyhalite
- Portlandite
- Posnjakite
- Poudretteite
- Povondraite
- Powellite
- Prehnite
- Proustite
- Pseudobrookite
- Pseudomalachite
- Pseudowollastonite
- Pumpellyite (group of sorosilicates)
- Purpurite
- Putnisite
- Pyrargyrite
- Pyrite
- Pyrochlore (mineral group)
- Pyrolusite
- Pyromorphite
- Pyrope
- Pyrophanite
- Pyrophyllite
- Pyroxene (group of silicate minerals)
- Pyroxferroite
- Pyroxmangite
- Pyrrhotite

Varieties that are not valid species:

- Parachrysotile (a polytype of chrysotile)
- Pelagosite (variety of aragonite)
- Pericline (variety of albite)
- Peridot (gem-quality olivine)
- Perlite (volcanic glass)
- Phengite (variety of muscovite)
- Pimelite
- Pitchblende (a massive impure form of uraninite)
- Plessite (mixture of kamacite and taenite)
- Potassium alum or potash alum (as a mineral, is called alum-(K))

== Q ==
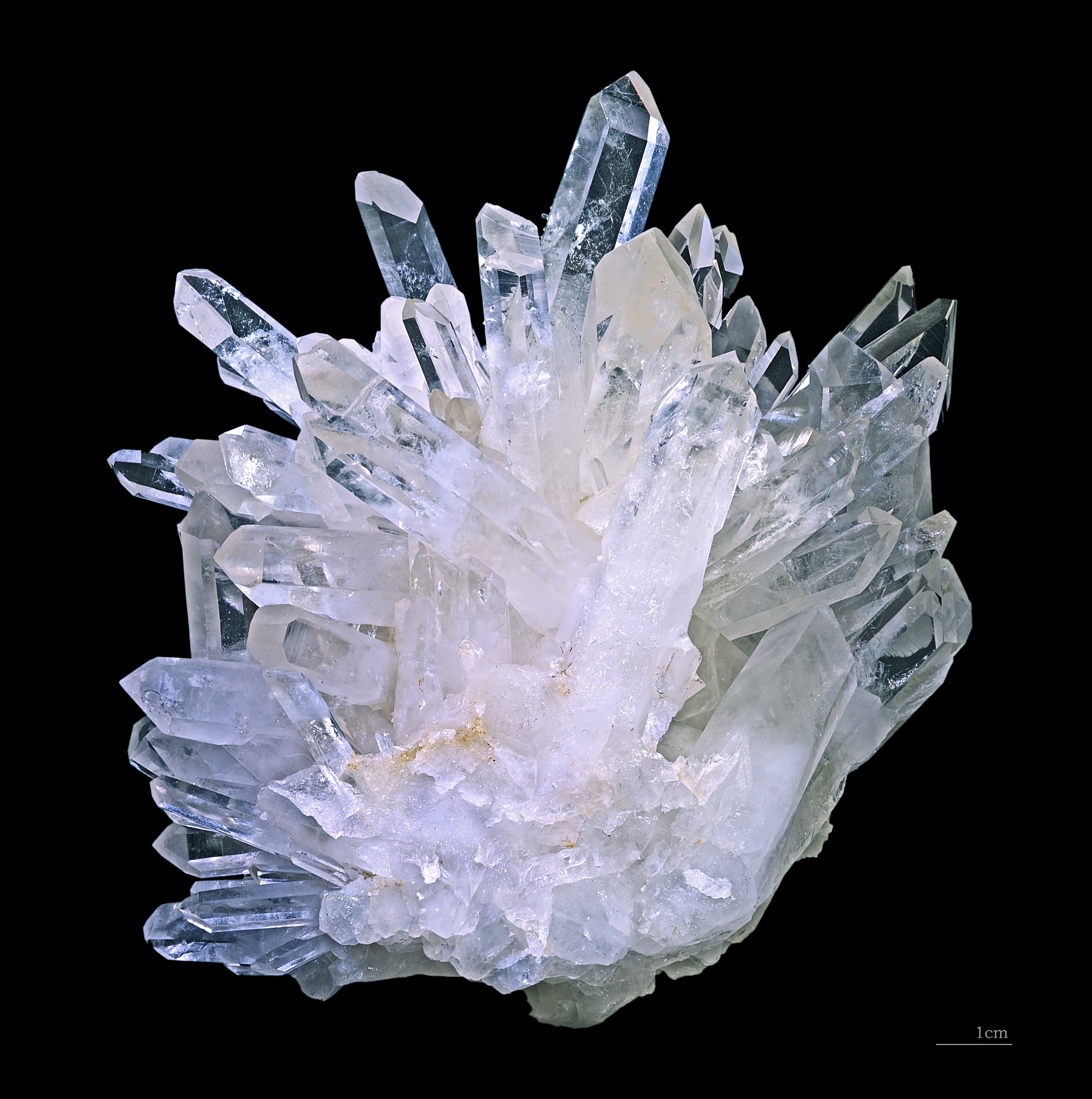
Quartz

- Qingsongite
- Quartz
- Quenstedtite
- Quetzalcoatlite
- Quintinite
- Qusongite

== R ==
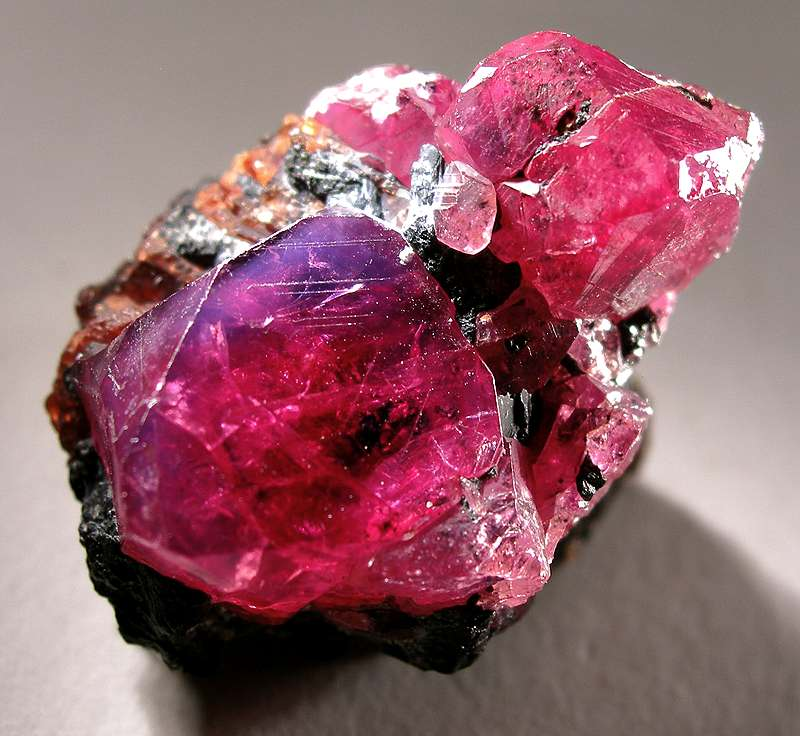
Crystals of cherry red ruby in matrix

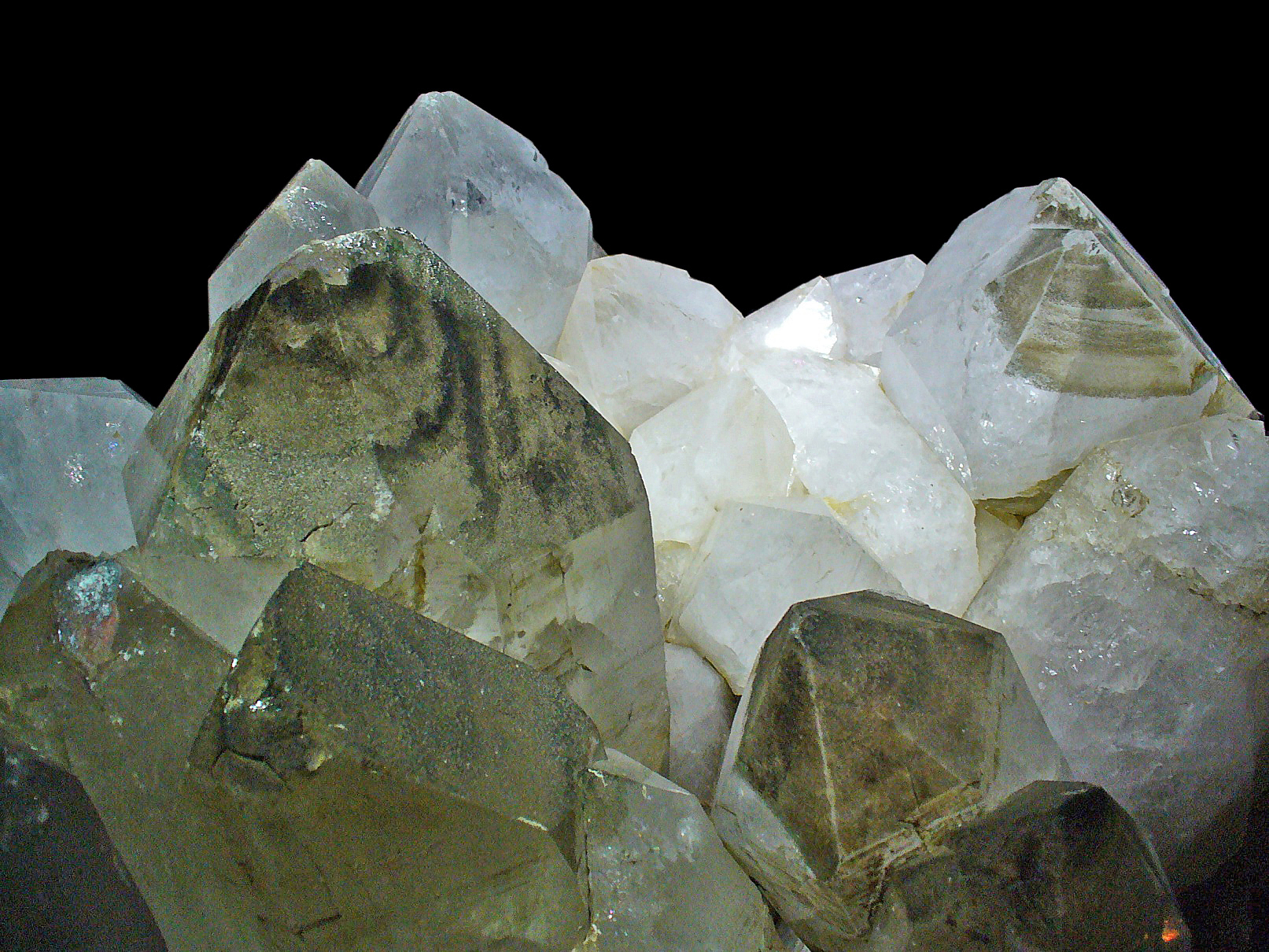
Rock crystal

- Rakovanite
- Rambergite
- Rameauite
- Rammelsbergite
- Rapidcreekite
- Raslakite
- Raspite
- Rastsvetaevite
- Realgar
- Reederite-(Y)
- Reedmergnerite
- Reidite
- Reinerite
- Renierite
- Rheniite
- Rhodochrosite
- Rhodonite
- Rhodplumsite
- Rhomboclase
- Richterite
- Rickardite
- Riebeckite
- Ringwoodite
- Roaldite
- Robertsite
- Rodalquilarite
- Romanèchite
- Romeite
- Rosasite
- Roscoelite
- Roselite
- Rosenbergite
- Rosickýite
- Routhierite
- Rozenite
- Rubicline
- Ruizite
- Russellite
- Ruthenium
- Rutherfordine
- Rutile
- Rynersonite

Varieties that are not valid species:

- Rashleighite (variety of turquoise)
- Rhodolite (variety of pyrope)
- Rock crystal (quartz)
- Rose quartz (pink variety of quartz)
- Ruby (red gem corundum)

== S ==
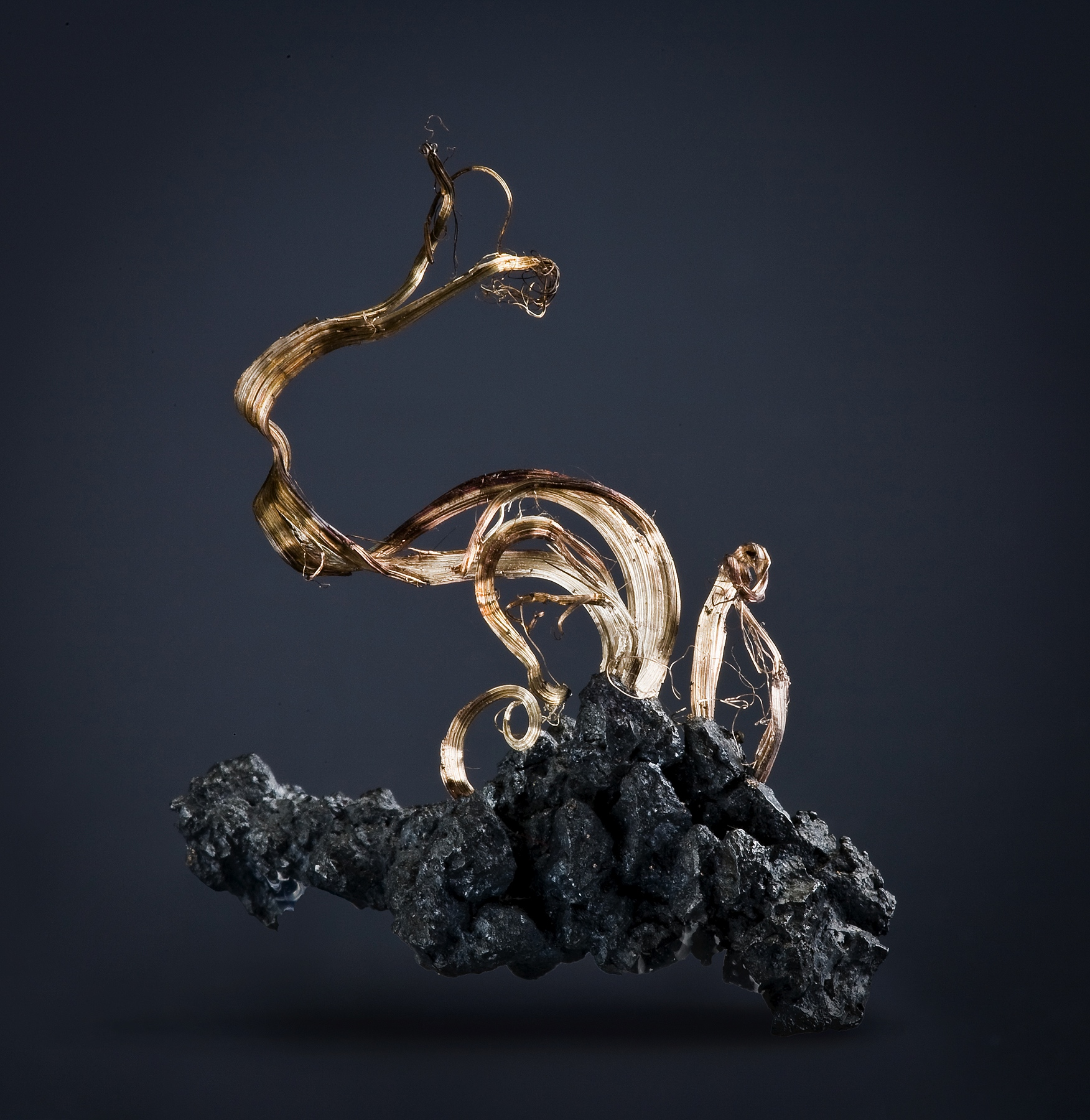
Native silver on Acanthite, Imiter Mine, Ouarzazate Province, Morocco

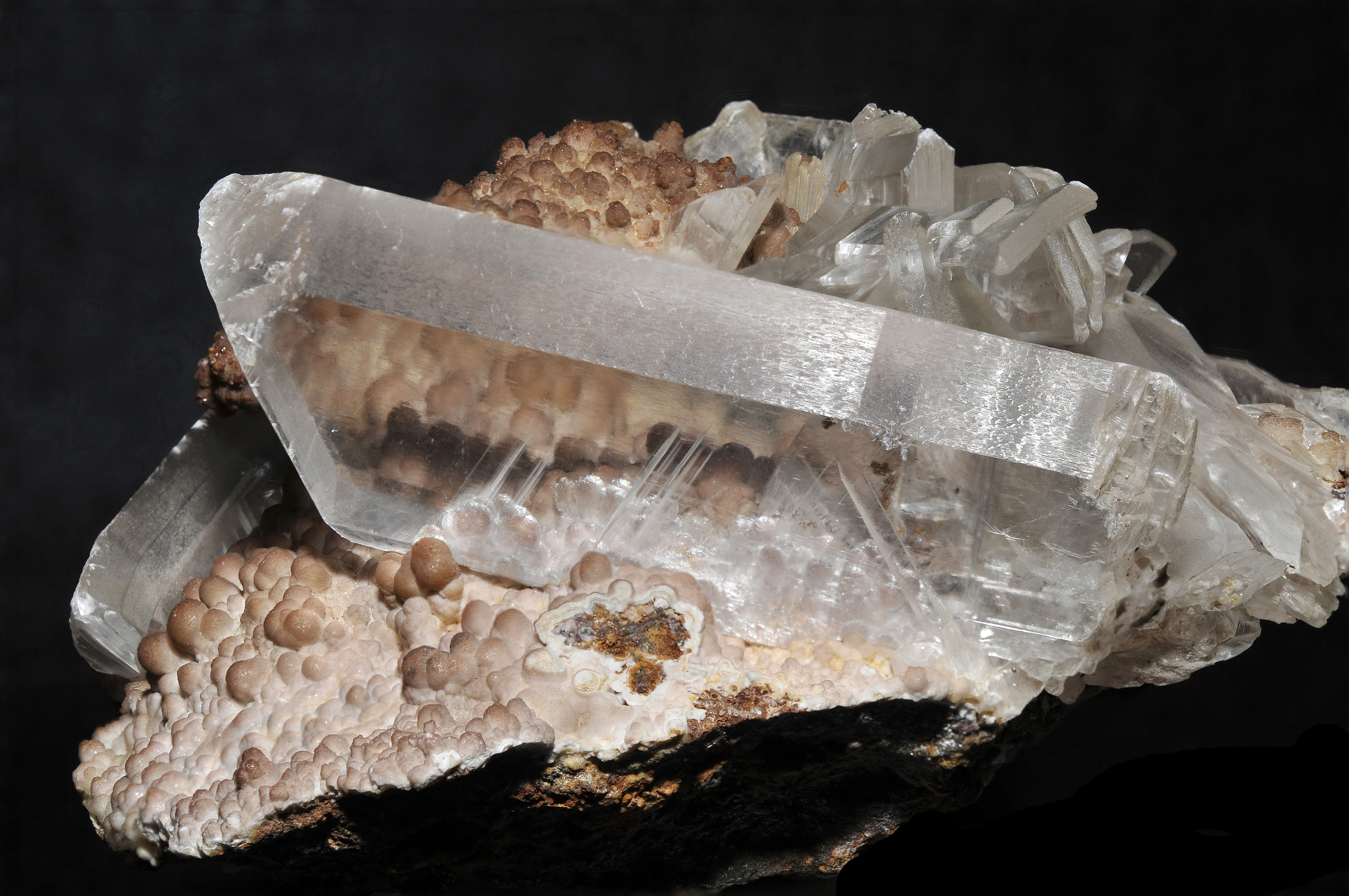
Gypsum (selenite variety): Santa Eulalia District, Chihuahua, Mexico

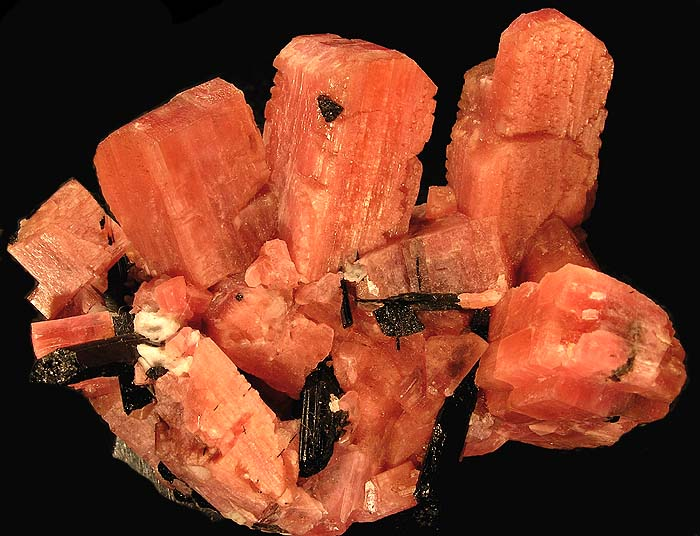
Serandite clusters from Poudrette quarry, Mont Saint-Hilaire, Montérégie, Québec, Canada

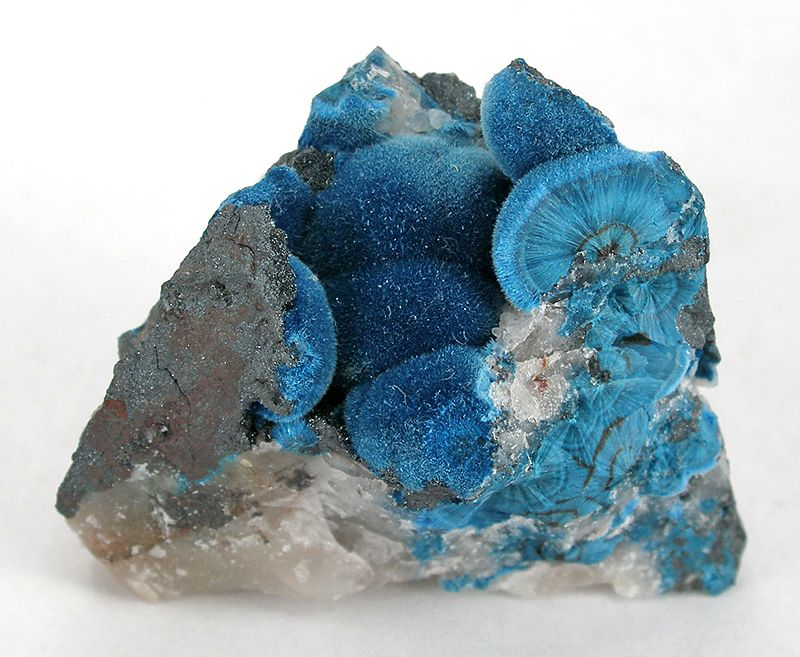
Botryoidal balls of shattuckite, from Otjikotu, Kaokoveld, Kunene, Namibia

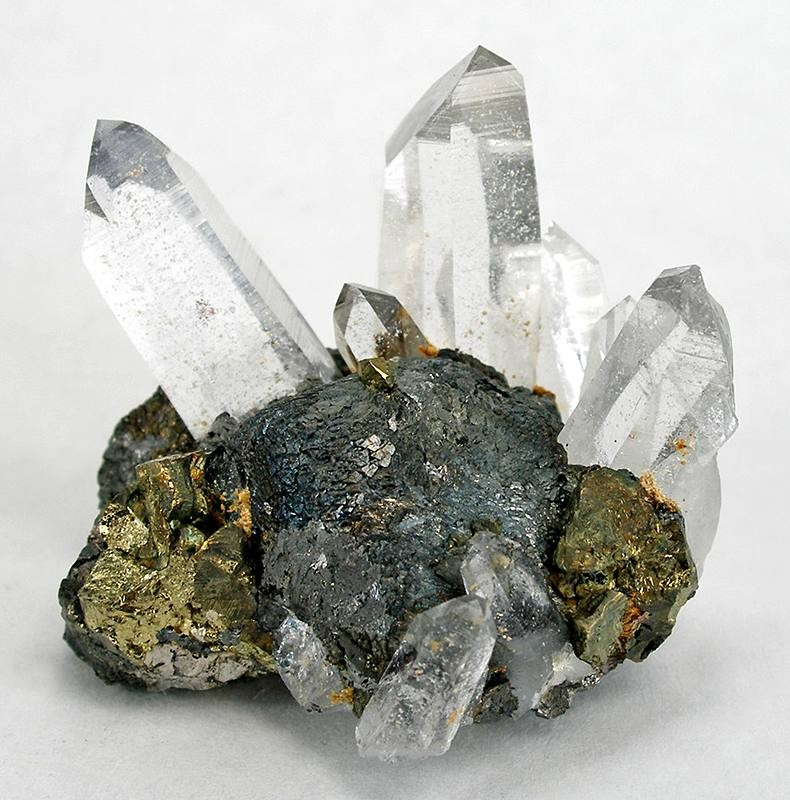
Ball of stepped stannite crystals flanked by splaying GEM quartzes and golden chalcopyrite at its upper edge, from Yaogangxian Mine, Yizhang County, Chenzhou Prefecture, Hunan Province, China

- Sabatierite
- Sabieite
- Sabinaite
- Sacrofanite
- Safflorite
- Sal ammoniac
- Saleeite
- Saliotite
- Salzburgite
- Samarskite-(Y)
- Sampleite
- Samsonite
- Samuelsonite
- Sanbornite
- Sandstone
- Saneroite
- Sanguite
- Sanidine (orthoclase variety)
- Santabarbaraite
- Santite
- Saponite (clay mineral)
- Sapphirine
- Sarabauite
- Sarcolite
- Sarkinite
- Sassolite
- Satterlyite
- Sauconite
- Sborgite
- Scapolite (a group of silicate minerals)
- Schäferite
- Scheelite
- Schizolite
- Schmiederite
- Schoepite
- Schorl (black tourmaline)
- Schreibersite
- Schreyerite
- Schröckingerite
- Schwertmannite
- Scolecite
- Scorodite
- Scorzalite
- Scotlandite
- Scrutinyite
- Seamanite
- Searlesite
- Seeligerite
- Segelerite
- Seifertite
- Sekaninaite
- Selenium
- Seligmannite
- Sellaite
- Semseyite
- Senarmontite
- Sengierite
- Sepiolite
- Serandite
- Serendibite
- Serpentine group
- Serpierite
- Sewardite
- Shandite
- Shattuckite
- Shigaite
- Shortite
- Siderite
- Siderophyllite
- Siderotil
- Siegenite
- Silicate perovskite
- Sillimanite
- Native silver
- Simonellite
- Simpsonite
- Sincosite
- Sinkankasite
- Sinoite
- Skaergaardite
- Sklodowskite
- Skutterudite
- Smaltite
- Smectite (a group of clay minerals)
- Smithsonite
- Sodalite
- Soddyite
- Sonolite
- Sperrylite
- Spertiniite
- Spessartine
- Sphalerite
- Spherocobaltite
- Spinel
- Spodumene
- Spurrite
- Stannite
- Stannoidite
- Staurolite
- Steacyite
- Stellerite
- Stephanite
- Stercorite
- Stibarsen
- Stibiconite
- Stibiopalladinite
- Stibnite
- Stichtite
- Stilbite (series of zeolites)
- Stilleite
- Stillwaterite
- Stillwellite-(Ce)
- Stilpnomelane
- Stishovite
- Stolzite
- Strashimirite
- Strengite
- Stromeyerite
- Strontianite
- Struvite
- Studenitsite
- Studtite
- Sturmanite
- Stützite
- Suanite
- Suessite
- Sugilite
- Sulfur
- Sursassite
- Susannite
- Sussexite
- Svanbergite
- Sweetite
- Switzerite
- Sylvanite
- Sylvite
- Synchysite-(Ce)
- Syngenite
- Szenicsite

Varieties that are not valid species:

- Sapphire (gem corundum of any color except red, especially blue varieties)
- Sard (a variety of chalcedony/quartz)
- Satinspar (a variety of gypsum)
- Selenite (a variety of gypsum)
- Simetite (a variety of amber)
- Smoky quartz (a brown or black variety of quartz)
- Soda niter (synonym of nitratine)
- Spectrolite (a variety of labradorite)
- Spessartite (synonym of spessartine)
- Sphene (synonym of titanite)
- Stantienite (a variety of amber)
- Sunstone (a variety of either oligoclase or orthoclase)

== T ==
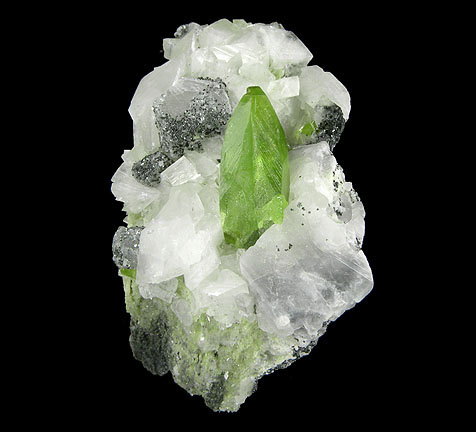
Crystal of titanite with adularia and minor clinochlore on matrix

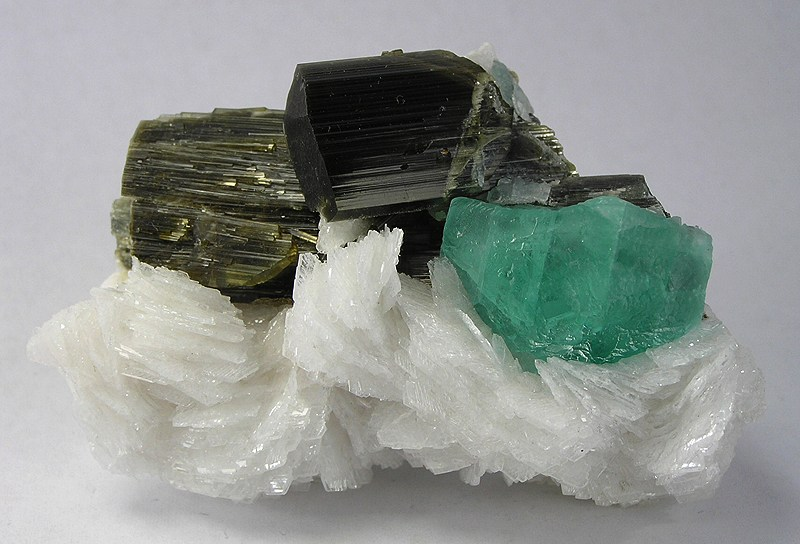
Fluorite crystal sitting beside a glassy, dark green tourmaline crystal, which itself sits atop a green tourmaline of a lighter color. All sit on a bed of sparkly, bladed stark white albite

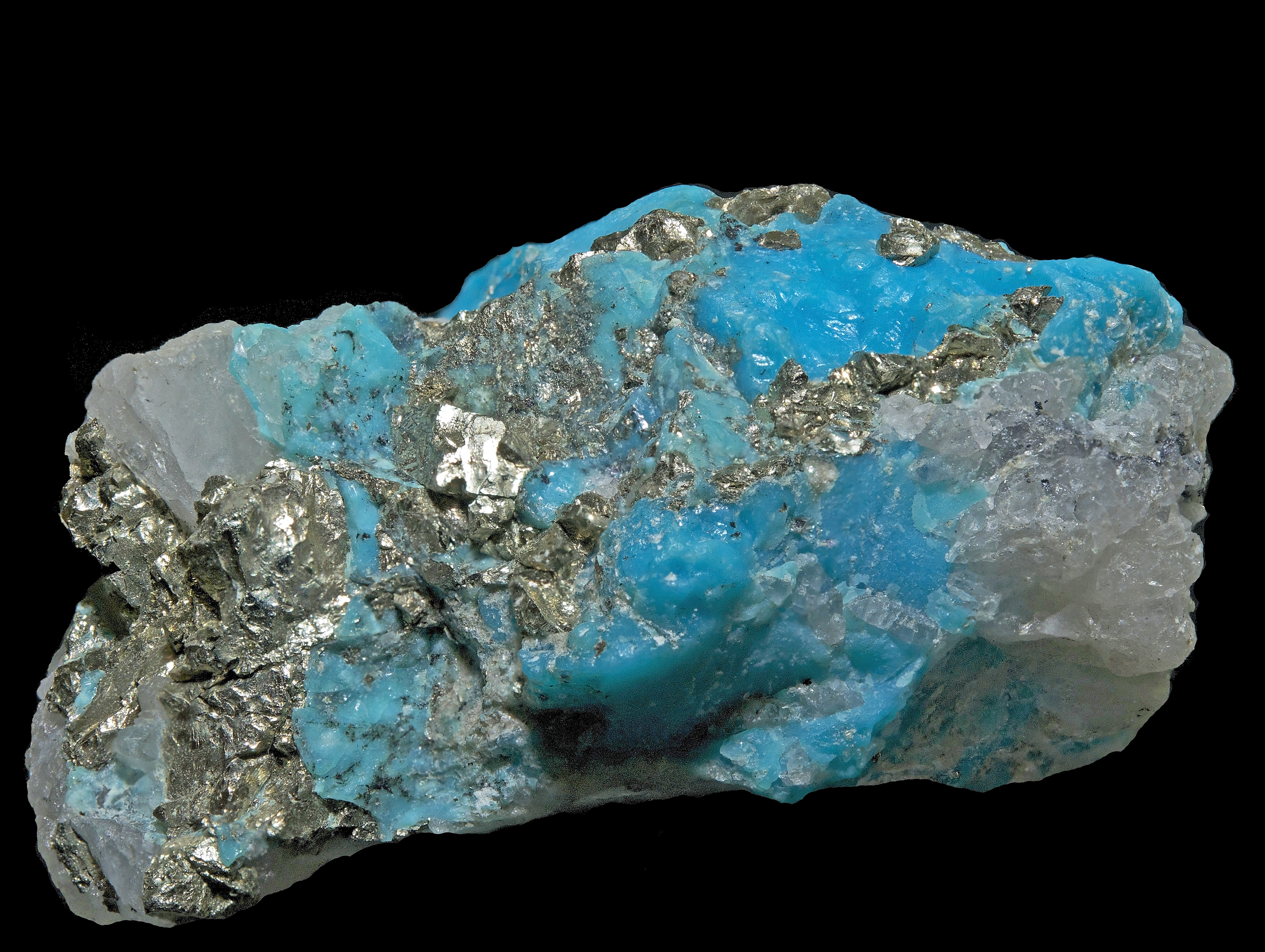
Turquoise from the Copper Cities Mine, near Miami, Arizona, USA

- Taaffeite
- Tachyhydrite
- Taenite
- Taikanite
- Takedaite
- Talc
- Talmessite
- Talnakhite
- Tamarugite
- Tangeite
- Tantalite
- Tantite
- Tapiolite (mineral series)
- Taranakite
- Tarapacaite
- Tarbuttite
- Tausonite
- Teallite
- Tellurite
- Tellurium
- Tellurobismuthite
- Temagamite
- Tennantite
- Tenorite
- Tephroite
- Terlinguaite
- Teruggite
- Tetradymite
- Tetrahedrite
- Tetrataenite
- Thaumasite
- Thenardite
- Thermonatrite
- Thiospinel group
- Thomasclarkite-(Y)
- Thomsenolite
- Thomsonite (series of zeolites)
- Thorianite
- Thorite
- Thortveitite
- Tiemannite
- Tienshanite
- Tilleyite
- Tinaksite
- Tincalconite
- Titanite
- Titanowodginite
- Tobermorite
- Todorokite
- Tokyoite
- Tongbaite
- Topaz
- Torbernite
- Tourmaline (group of silicate minerals)
- Tranquillityite
- Tremolite
- Trevorite
- Tridymite
- Triphylite
- Triplite
- Triploidite
- Tripuhyite
- Troilite
- Trona
- Tschermakite
- Tschermigite
- Tsugaruite
- Tsumcorite
- Tsumebite
- Tugtupite
- Tungstite
- Tuperssuatsiaite
- Turquoise
- Tusionite
- Tyrolite
- Tyrrellite
- Tyuyamunite

Varieties that are not valid species:

- Tanzanite (variety of zoisite)
- Thulite (variety of zoisite)
- Thuringite (variety of chamosite)
- Tsavorite (gem variety of grossularite garnet)
- Tiger's eye (chatoyant variety of quartz)

== U ==
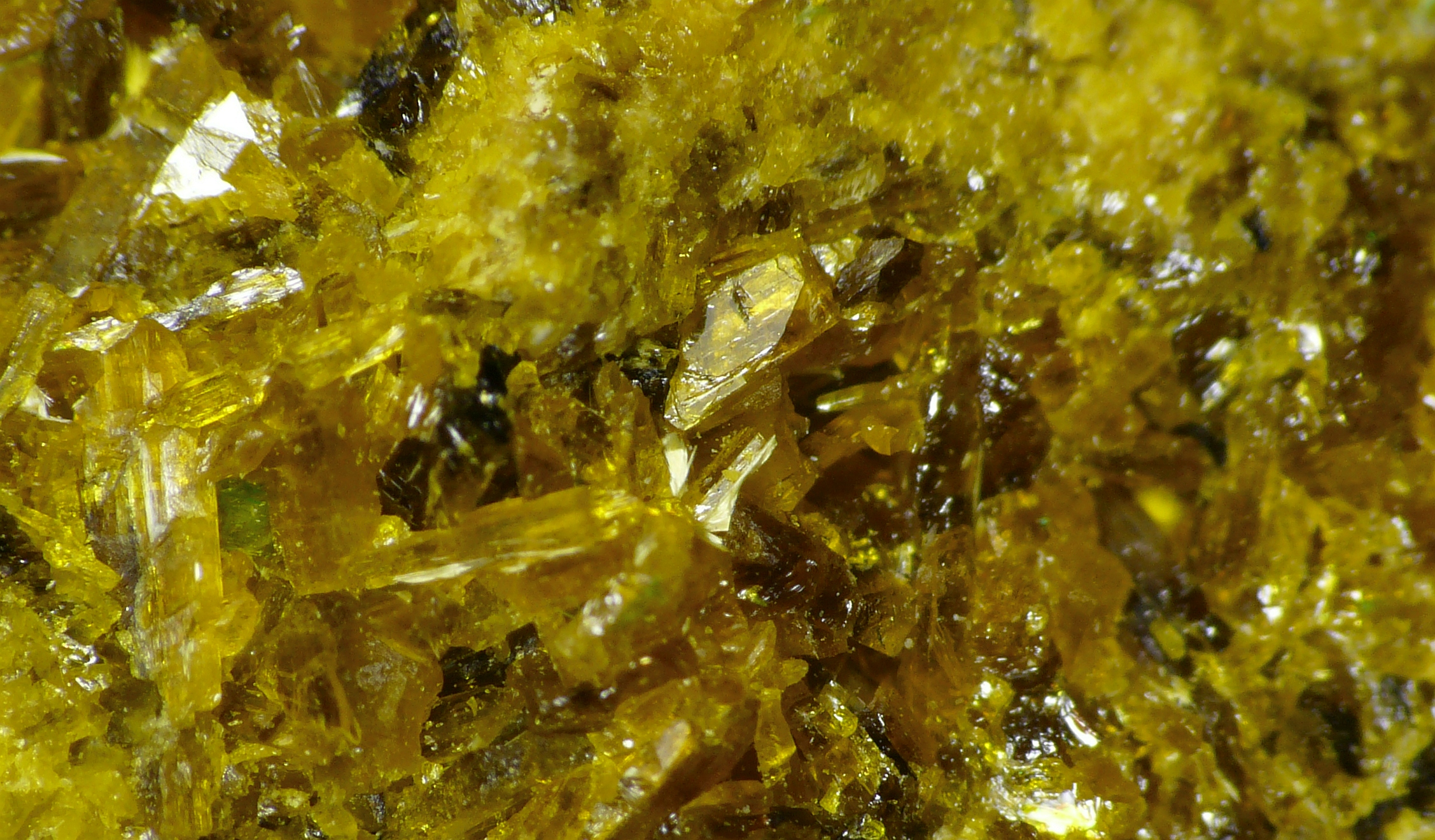
Uranophane, Musonoi Mine, Kolwezi, Katanga (Shaba), Democratic Republic of Congo. FOV: 6 mm

- Uralite (alteration actinolite)
- Uchucchacuaite
- Uklonskovite
- Ulexite
- Ullmannite
- Ulrichite
- Ulvöspinel
- Umangite
- Umbite
- Umohoite
- Ungemachite
- Upalite
- Uraninite
- Uranocircite-II
- Uranophane
- Uranopilite
- Urea (dubious as mineral)
- Uricite
- Urusovite
- Ussingite
- Utahite
- Uvarovite
- Uytenbogaardtite

== V ==
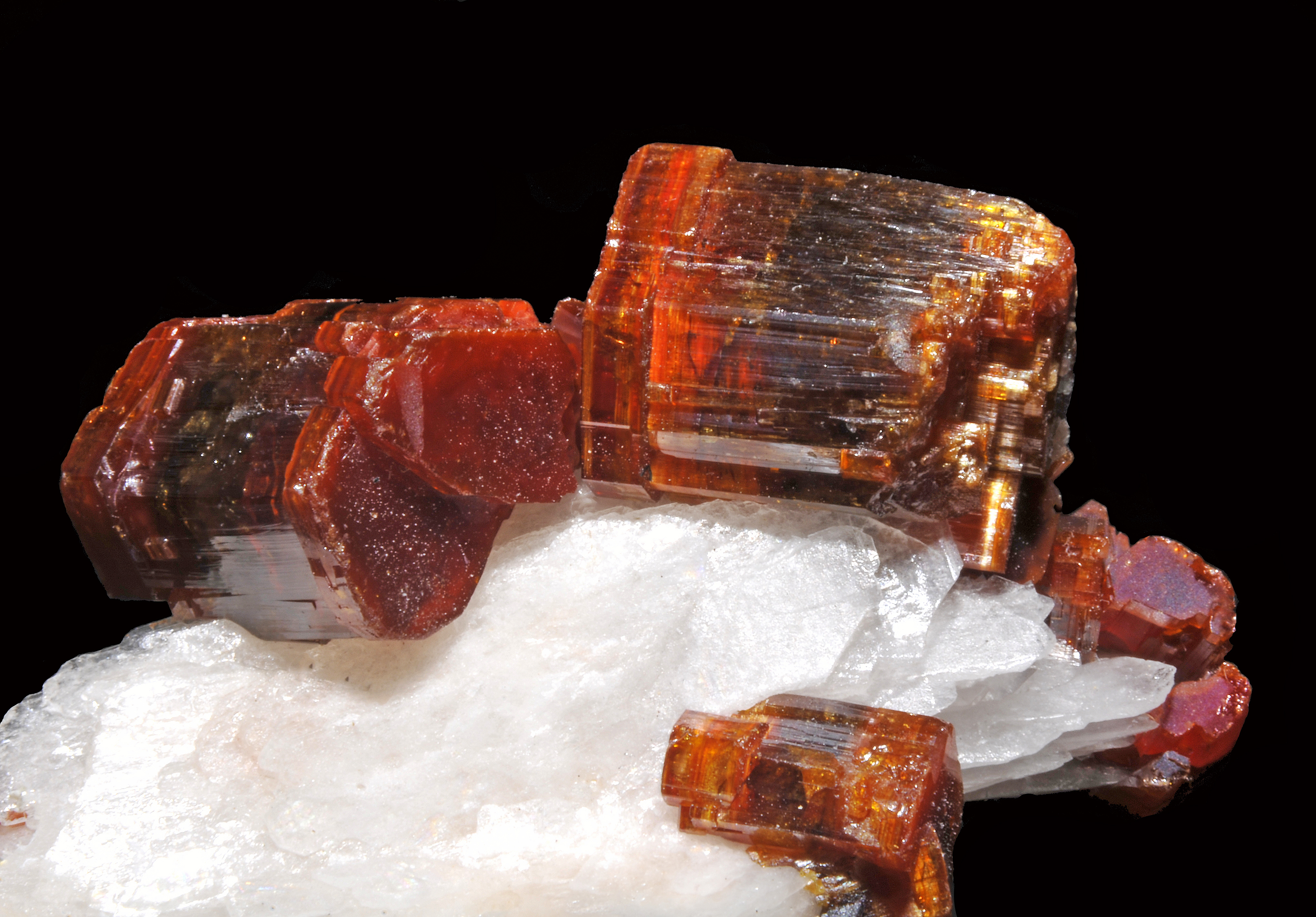
Vanadinite from the Mibladen Mining District, Morocco

- Vaesite
- Valentinite
- Valleriite
- Vanadinite
- Vanadiocarpholite
- Native Vanadium (rare)
- Vandenbrandeite
- Vantasselite
- Vanuralite
- Variscite
- Vaterite
- Vauquelinite
- Vauxite
- Veatchite
- Vermiculite
- Vesuvianite
- Villiaumite
- Violarite
- Vishnevite
- Vivianite
- Vladimirite
- Vlasovite
- Volborthite
- Vuagnatite
- Vulcanite

== W ==
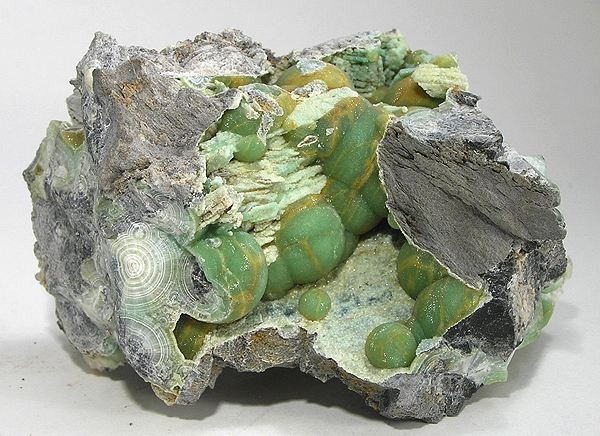
Deep green balls of wavellite in exposed pocket, from Mauldin Mountain Quarries, Montgomery County, Arkansas, USA

- Wadsleyite
- Wagnerite
- Wairakite
- Wakabayashilite
- Wakefieldite
- Walfordite
- Wardite
- Warikahnite
- Warwickite
- Wassonite
- Wattersite
- Water (as ice cubes)
- Wavellite
- Weddellite
- Weeksite
- Weilite
- Weissite
- Weloganite
- Whewellite
- Whiteite (group of minerals)
- Whitlockite
- Willemite
- Wiluite
- Witherite
- Wodginite
- Wolframite
- Wollastonite
- Woodhouseite
- Wöhlerite
- Wulfenite
- Wurtzite
- Wüstite
- Wyartite

== X ==
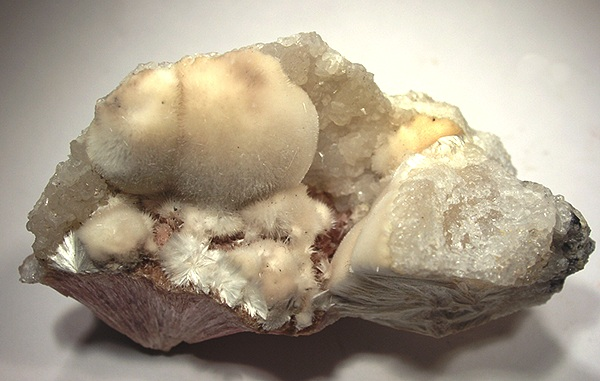
Radial fibrous inesite and xonotlite from Northern Cape Province, South Africa

- Xanthiosite
- Xanthoconite
- Xanthoxenite
- Xenophyllite
- Xenotime
- Xiangjiangite
- Xieite
- Xifengite
- Xilingolite
- Ximengite
- Xingzhongite
- Xitieshanite
- Xocolatlite
- Xocomecatlite
- Xonotlite

== Y ==
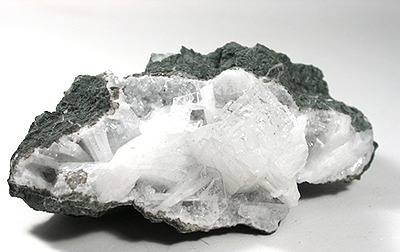
Yugawaralite crystals in a sheltered vug, from Jalgaon District, Maharashtra, India

- Ye'elimite
- Yingjiangite
- Yoshiokaite
- Yttrialite
- Yttrogummite
- Yttropyrochlore-(Y) (obruchevite)
- Yugawaralite
- Yuksporite

Varieties that are not valid species:

- Yttrocerite (variety of fluorite)
- Yttrocolumbite (variety of columbite)

== Z ==
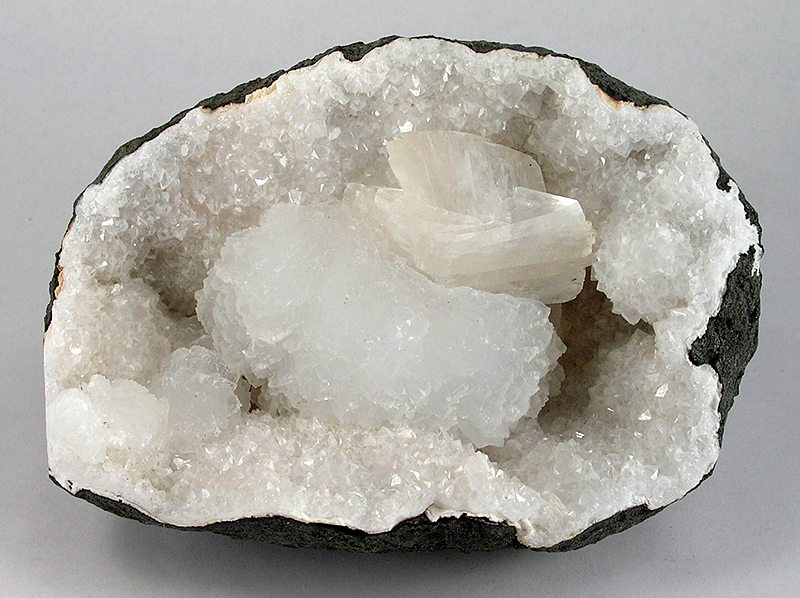
Zeolite with heulandite on quartz

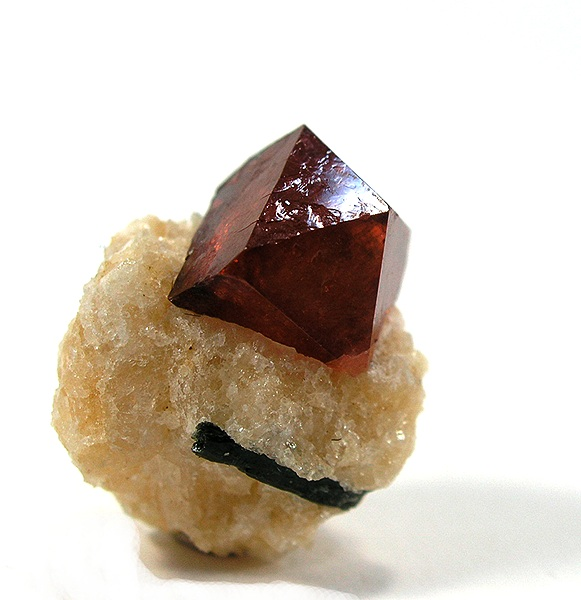
Zircon from Gilgit, Pakistan

- Zabuyelite
- Zaccagnaite
- Zaherite
- Zaïrite
- Zakharovite
- Zanazziite
- Zaratite
- Zavaritskite
- Zektzerite
- Zellerite
- Zemannite
- Zeolite (group of silicate minerals)
- Zeunerite
- Zhanghengite
- Zhangpeishanite
- Zharchikhite
- Zhemchuzhnikovite
- Ziesite
- Zimbabweite
- Zincite
- Zinclipscombite
- Zincmelanterite
- Zincobotryogen
- Zincochromite
- Zincolivenite
- Zinkenite
- Zinnwaldite
- Zippeite
- Zircon
- Zirconolite
- Zircophyllite
- Zirkelite
- Znucalite
- Zoisite
- Zorite
- Zunyite
- Zussmanite
- Zykaite

Varieties that are not valid species:

- Zajacite-(Ce) (name changed to gagarinite-(Ce))
- Zhonghuacerite-(Ce) (considered to be kukharenkoite-(Ce) or huanghoite-(Ce))
- Zinalsite (synonym of fraipontite)

== See also ==
- Chemical gardening – Demonstration of metallic salts crystallization
- Classification of minerals
  - Classification of non-silicate minerals – List of IMA recognized minerals and groupings
  - Classification of silicate minerals – List of IMA recognized minerals and groupings
  - Classification of organic minerals – List of IMA recognized minerals and groupings
- Industrial mineral – Geological materials mined for commercial value in industry
- Critical mineral raw materials – European Union legislation
- List of decorative stones
- List of individual gemstones
- List of meteorite minerals
- List of minerals named after people
- List of minerals recognized by the International Mineralogical Association
- List of mineral tests
- List of minerals by optical properties
- Mineral collecting – Hobby of collecting mineral specimens
- Timeline of the discovery and classification of minerals
