= List of minerals recognized by the International Mineralogical Association (A) =

This list includes those recognised minerals beginning with the letter A. The International Mineralogical Association is the international group that recognises new minerals and new mineral names; however, minerals discovered before 1959 did not go through the official naming procedure, although some minerals published previously have been either confirmed or discredited since that date. This list contains a mixture of mineral names that have been approved since 1959 and those mineral names believed to still refer to valid mineral species (these are called "grandfathered" species).

The list is divided into groups:

- Introduction • (Main synonyms)
- A • B • C • D • E • F • G • H • I • J • K • L • M • N • O • P–Q • R • S • T • U–V • W–X • Y–Z

The data was exported from mindat.org on 29 April 2005; updated up to 'IMA2021'.

The minerals are sorted by name, followed by the structural group (rruff.info/ima and ima-cnmnc by mineralienatlas.de, mainly) or chemical class (mindat.org and basics), the year of publication (if it's before of an IMA approval procedure), the IMA approval and the Strunz-mindat code. The first link is to mindat.org, the second link is to webmineral.com, and the third is to the Handbook of Mineralogy (Mineralogical Society of America).

- Abbreviations:
  - ^{D} – discredited (IMA/CNMNC status).
  - ^{Q} – questionable/ doubtful (IMA/CNMNC, mindat.org or mineralienatlas.de status).
  - ^{N} – published without approval of the IMA/CNMNC, or just not an IMA approved mineral but with some acceptance in the scientific community nowadays.
  - ^{I} – intermediate member of a solid-solution series.
  - ^{H} – hypothetical mineral (synthetic, anthropogenic, suspended approval procedure, etc.)
    - ^{ch} – incomplete description, hypothetical solid solution end member.
  - Rd – redefinition of ...
  - "s.p." – special procedure.
  - group – a name used to designate a group of species, sometimes only a mineral group name.
  - no – no link available.
  - IUPAC – chemical name.
  - Y: NNNN – year of publication.
  - Y: old – known before publications were available.

== A ==
=== Aa – Ak ===
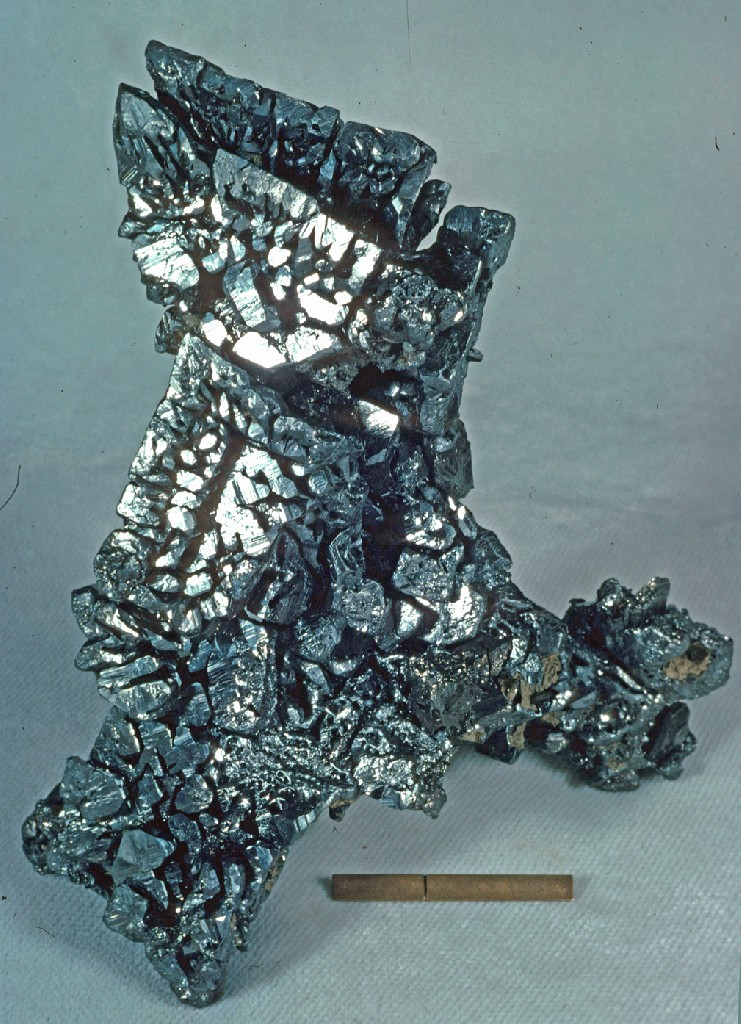
Acanthite, Chispas Mine, Arizpe, Sonora, Mexico

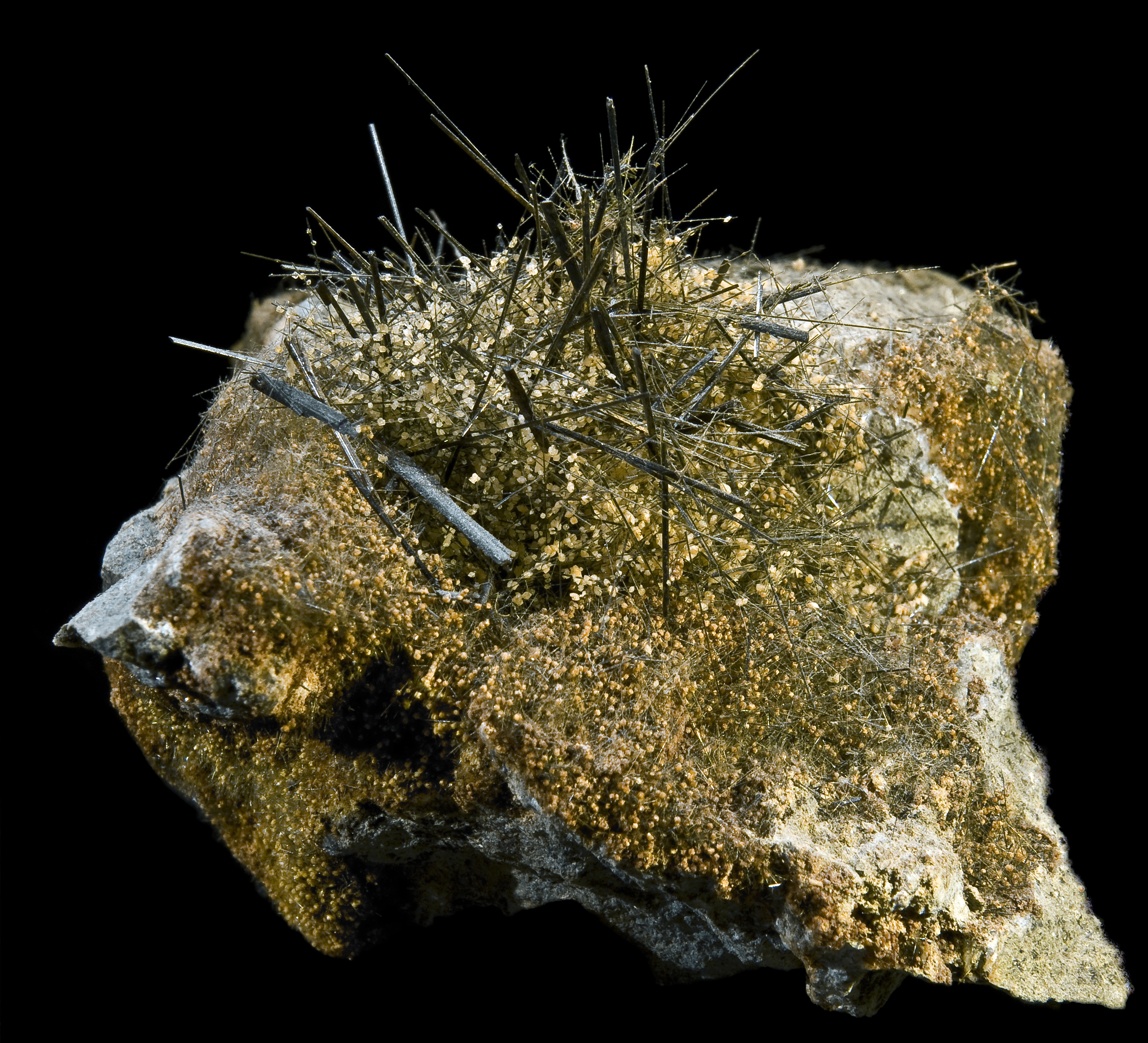
Actinolite (acicular form) with calcite

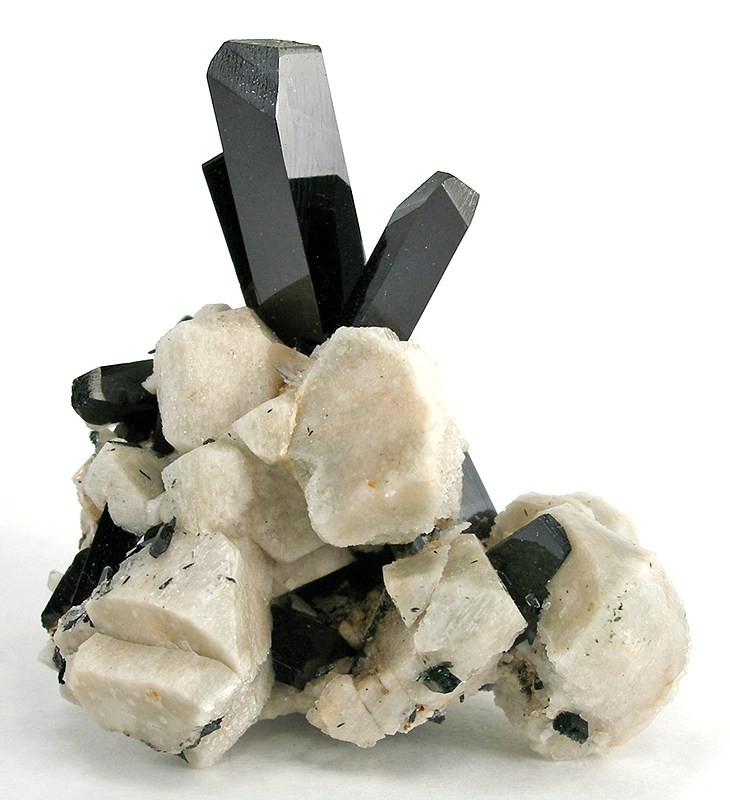
Combination of jet-black aegirines splaying out from matrix of feldspar

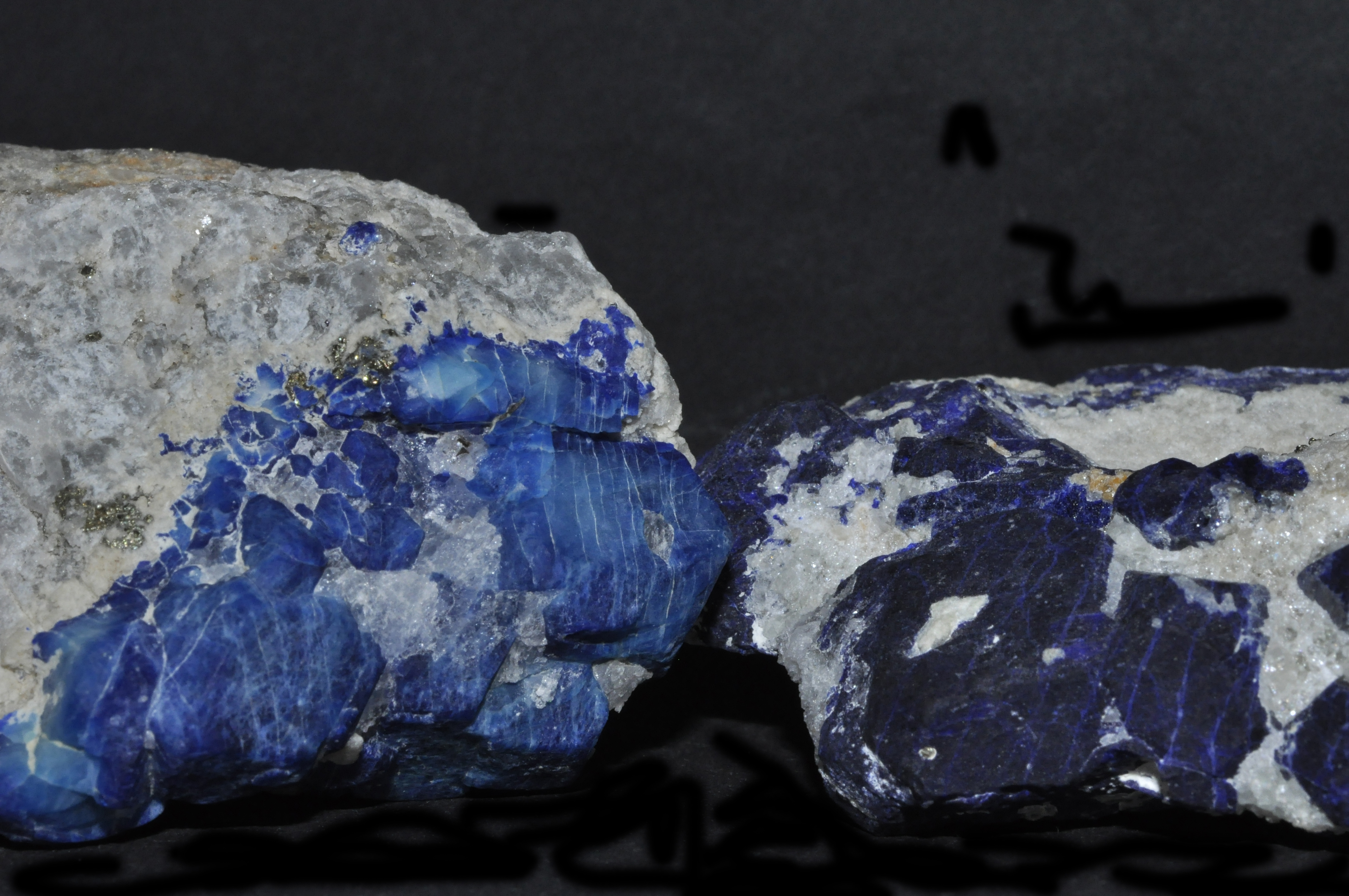
Afghanite on the left, lazurite on the right.

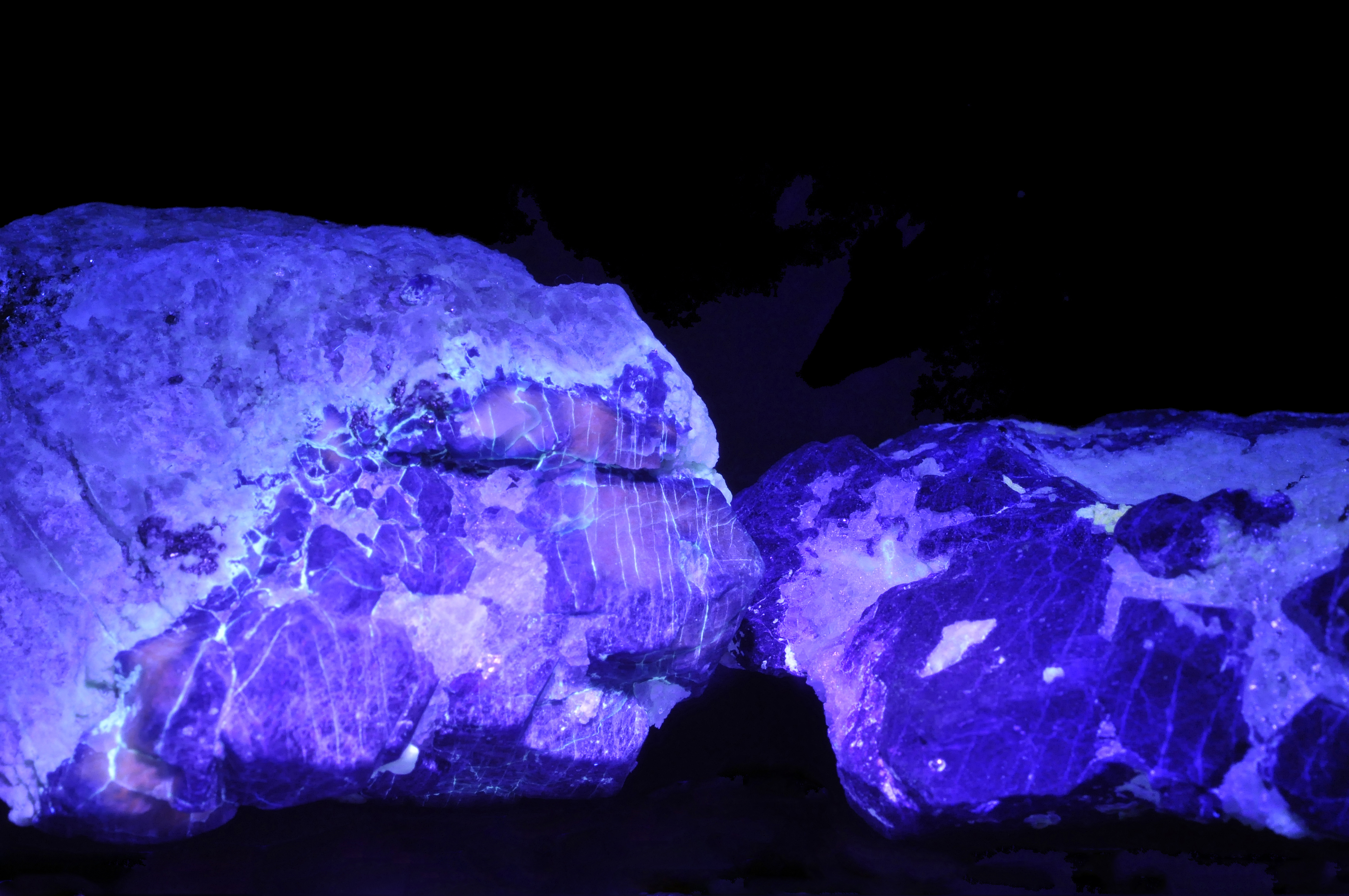
Afghanite viewed under ultra-violet light: calcite emits rose light as afghanite, lazurite doesn't emit visible light.

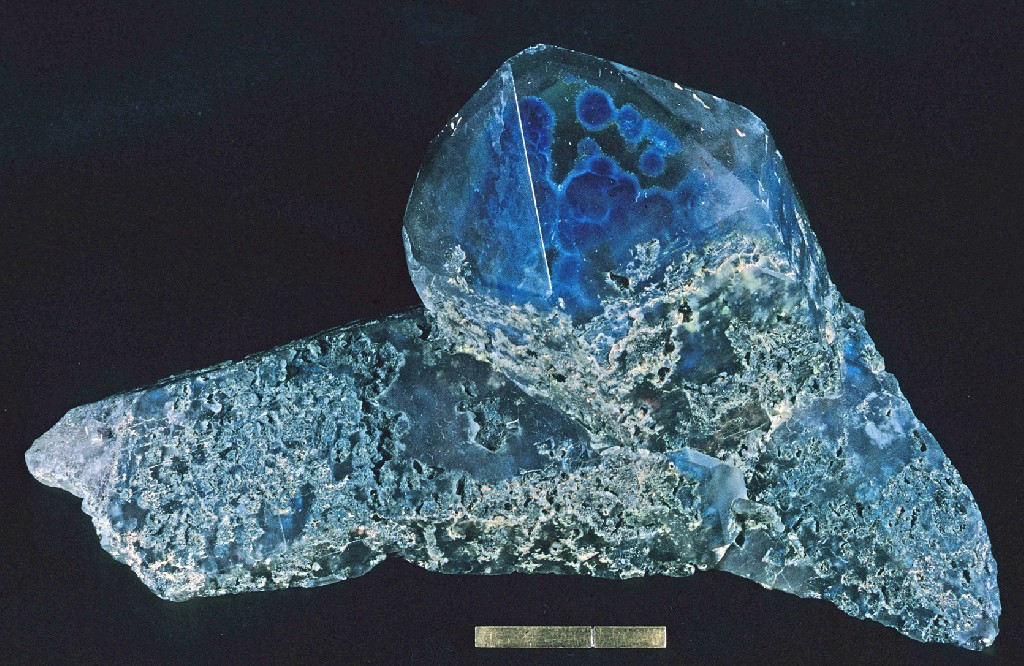
Ajoite in quartz - Messina mine, Limpopo Province, South Africa

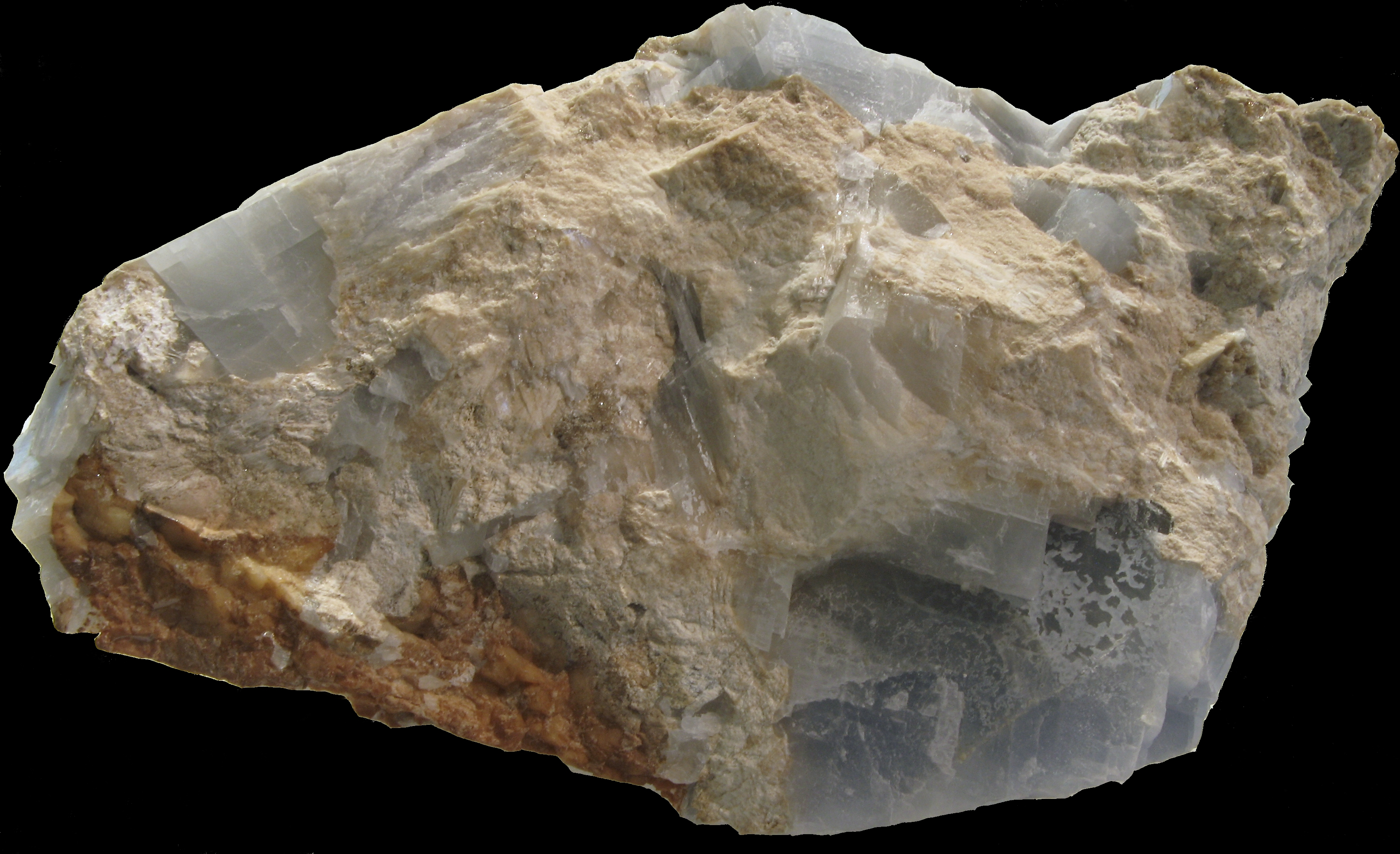
Åkermanite (yellowish brown), calcite (blue), hillebrandite (variety foshagite, fibrous), tilleyite (mallow colored), from Crestmore, Riverside, California, USA

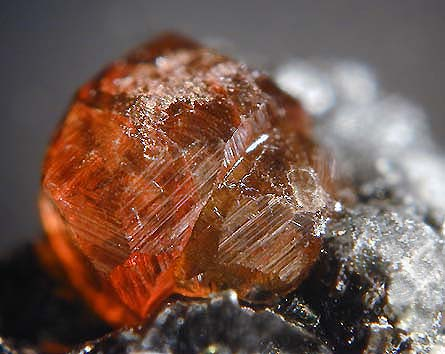
Almandine garnet crystal

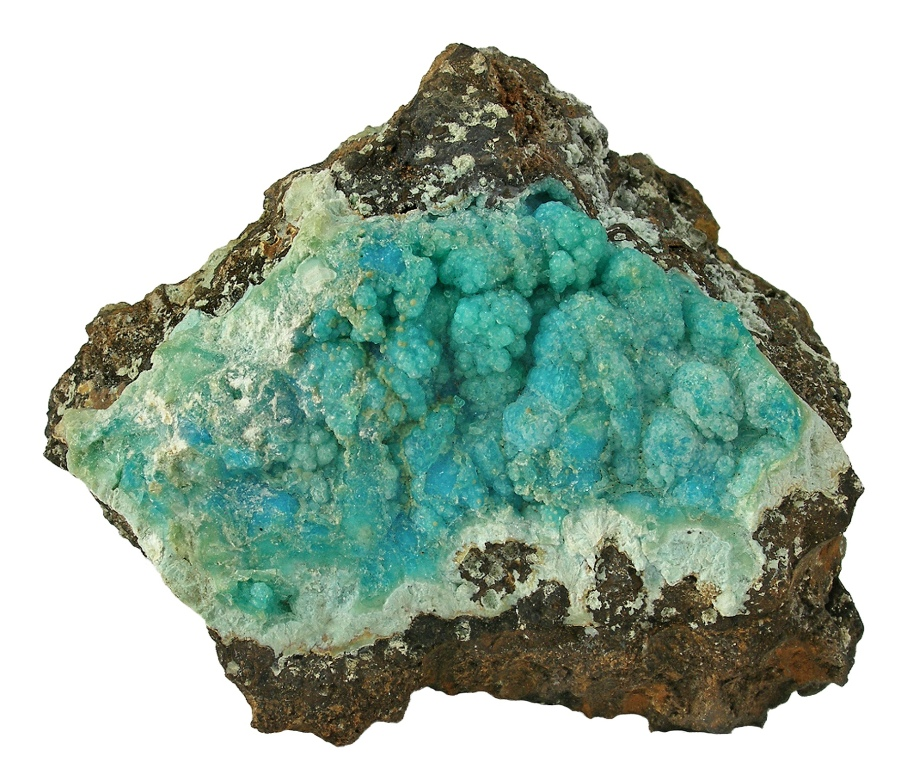
Allophane

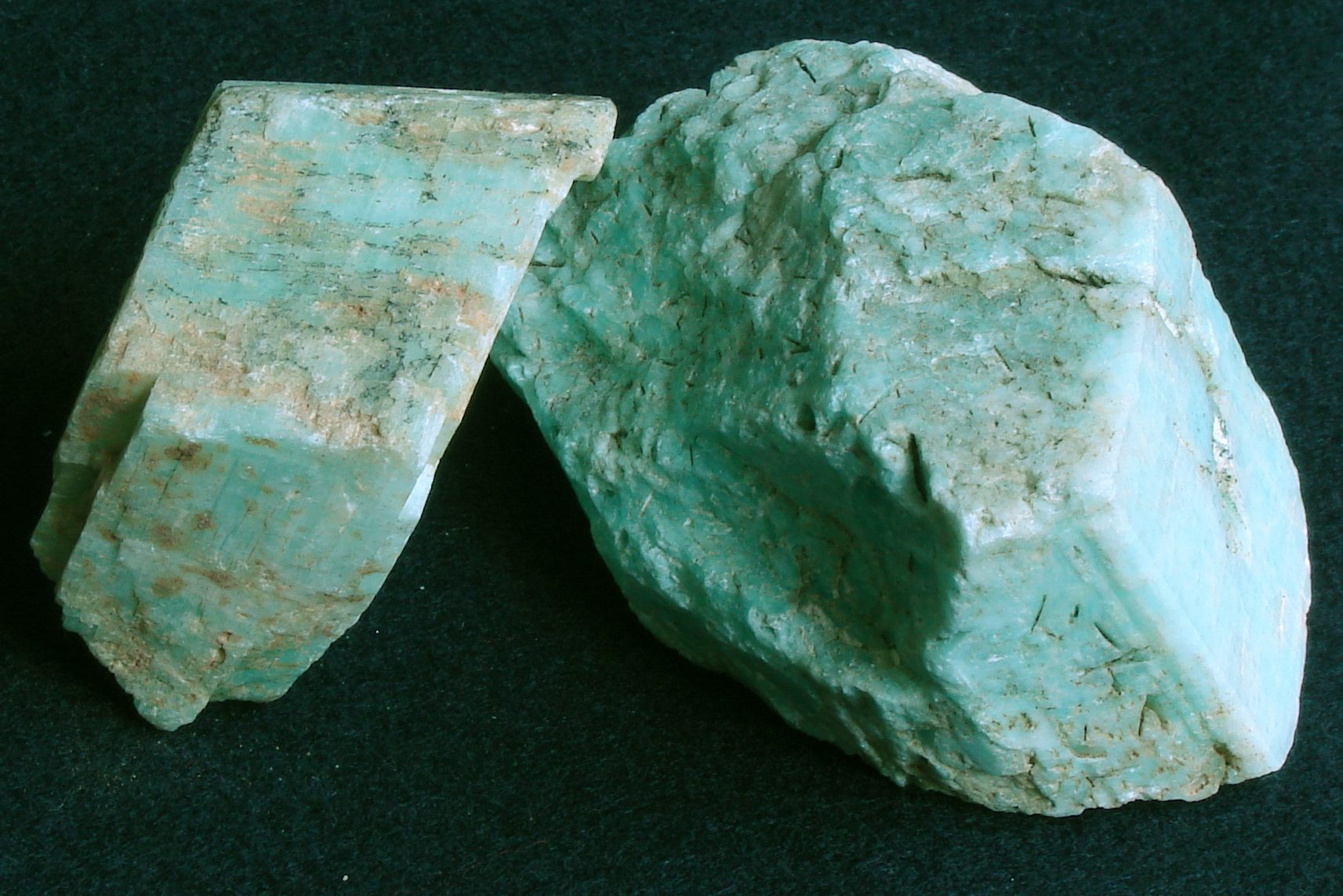
Microcline, var. amazonite from Brazil

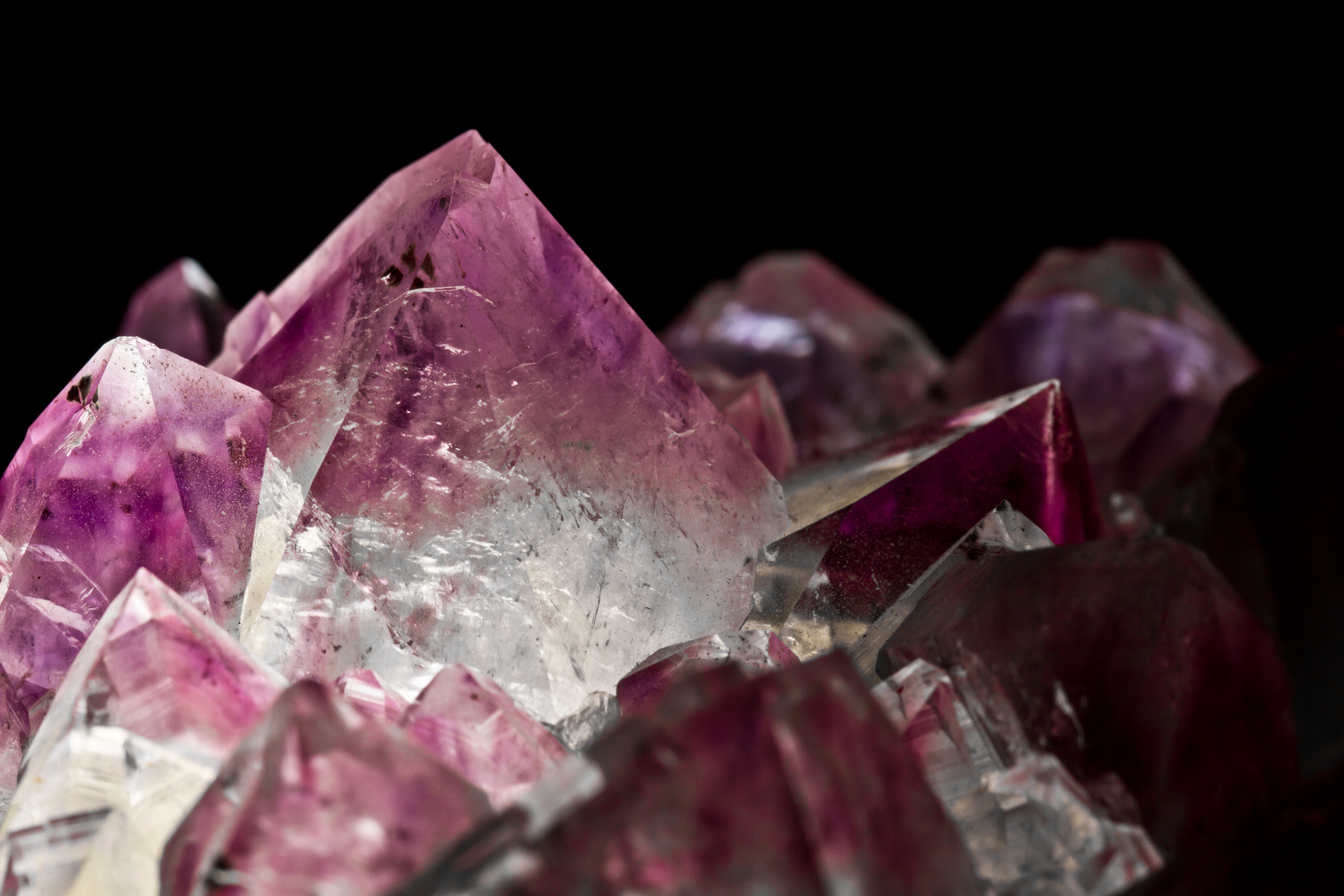
Amethyst crystals

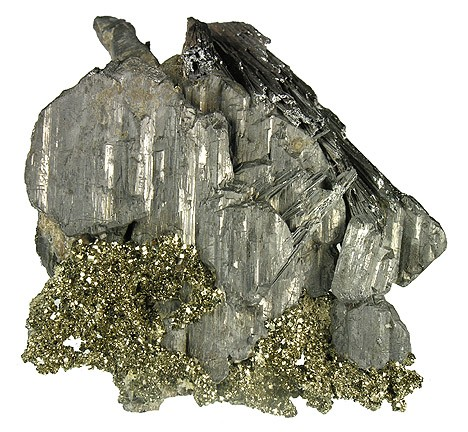
Andorite from San José Mine, Oruro City, Cercado Province, Oruro Department, Bolivia

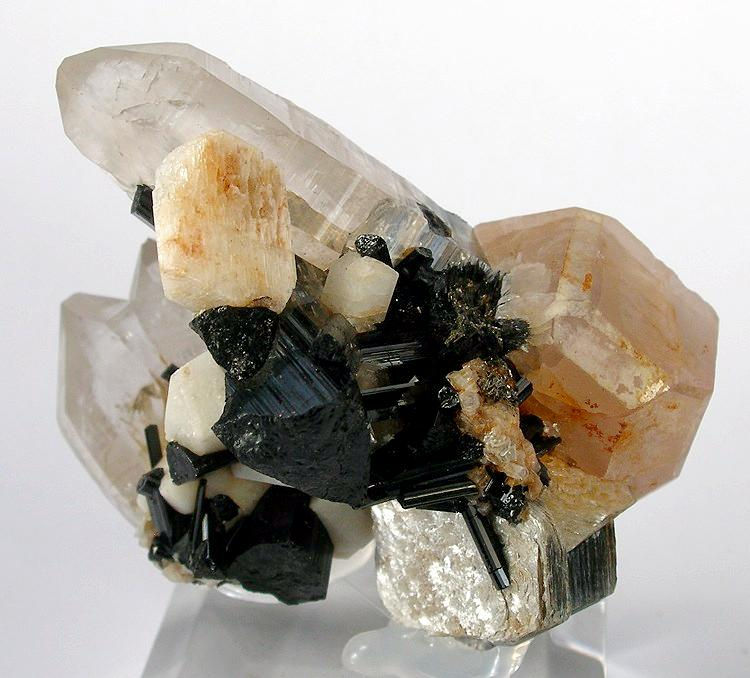
Pastel-pink apatite crystal, transparent quartz crystals, jet-black schorl, muscovite and sharp albite crystals

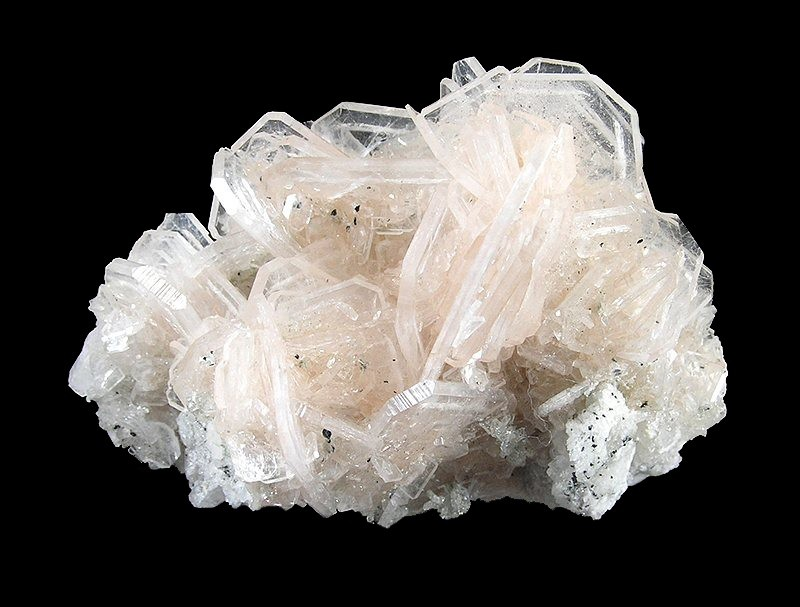
Crystals of apophyllite piled up on matrix

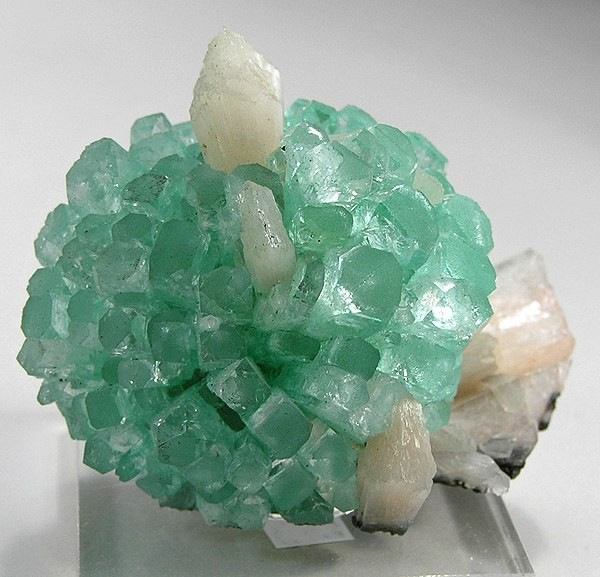
Mint green apophyllite-(KF) rosette, Momin Pada, Maharashtra, India

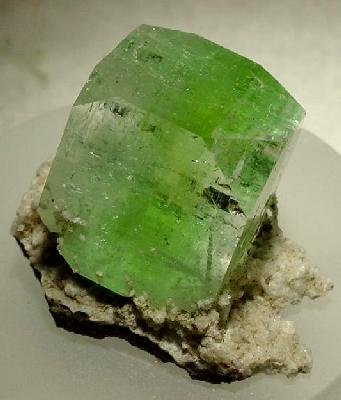
Apophyllite-(NaF). Nasik District, Maharashtra, India

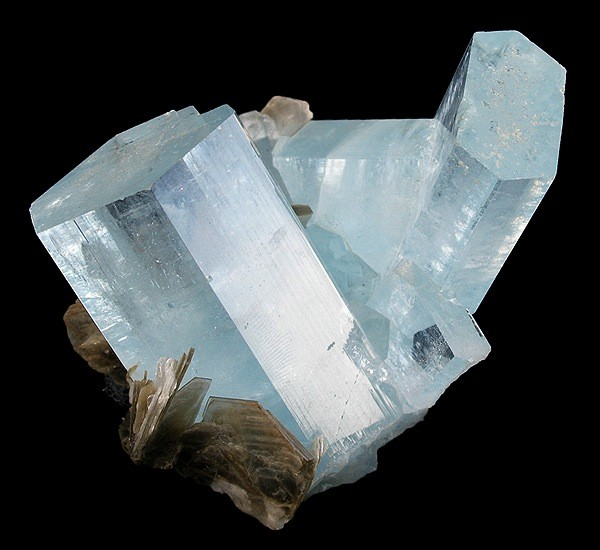
Nagar aquamarines have a tendency to form large clusters; from Nagar (Nagir), Hunza Valley, Gilgit District, Northern Areas, Pakistan

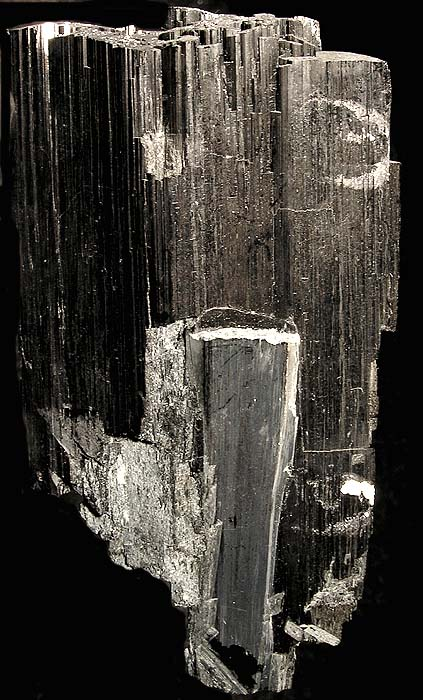
Arfvedsonite, Poudrette quarry, Mont Saint-Hilaire, Montérégie, Quebec

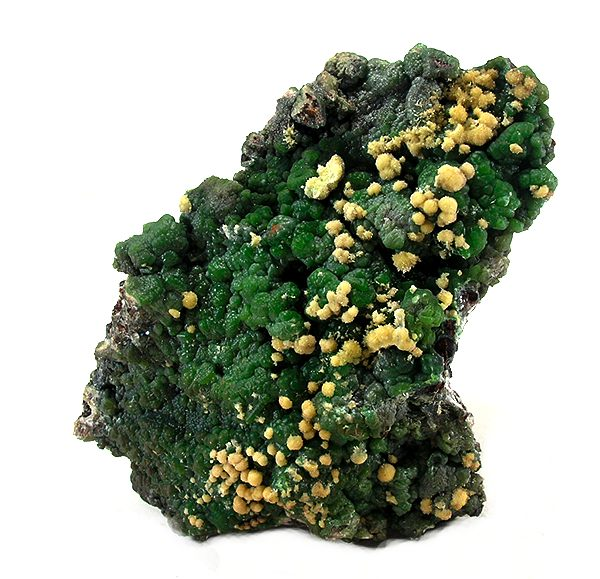
Arsendescloizite and mimetite, Ojuela Mine, Mapimí, Durango, Mexico

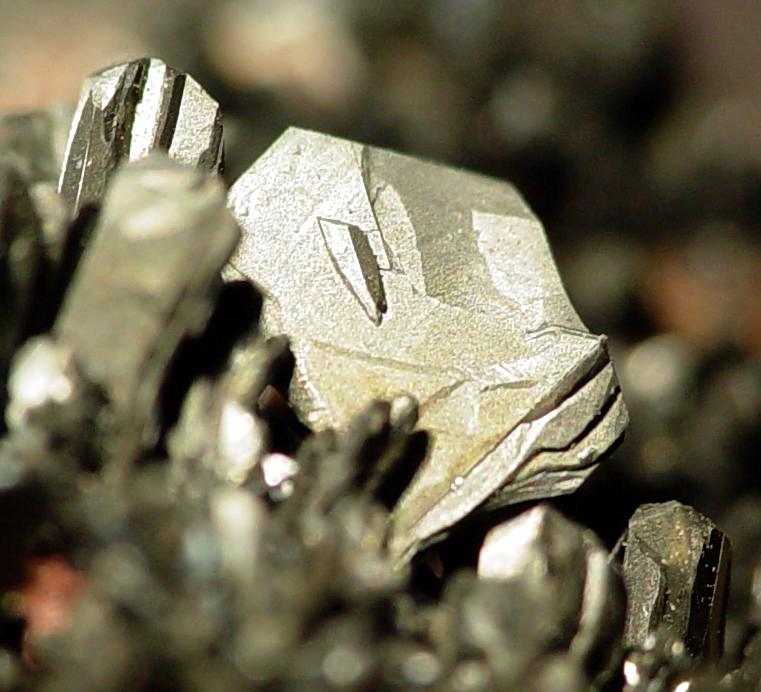
Native arsenic crystals, Ronna Mine, Kladno, Bohemia, Czech Republic

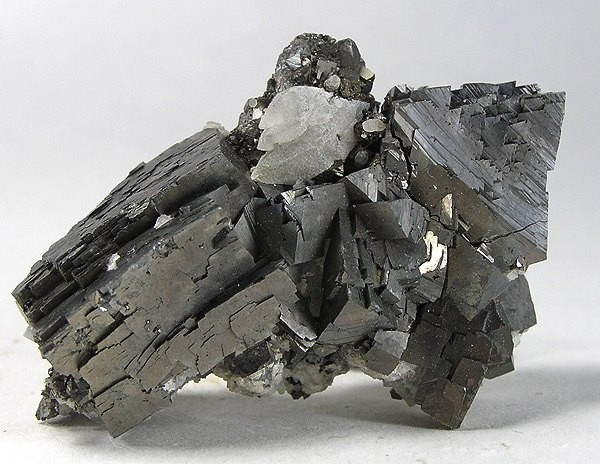
Arsenopyrite from Hidalgo del Parral, Chihuahua, Mexico

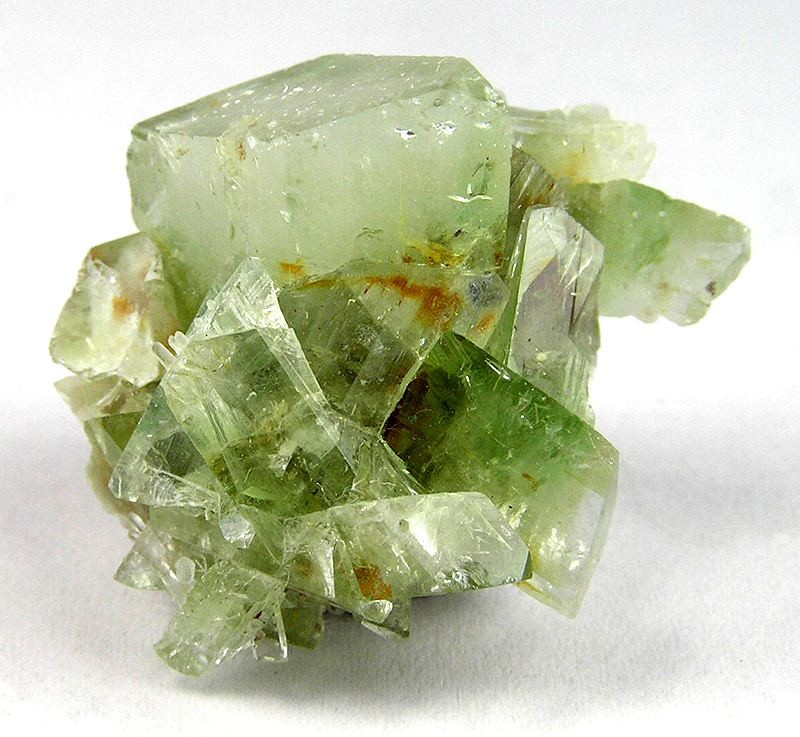
Crystal of augelite stands out in this cluster

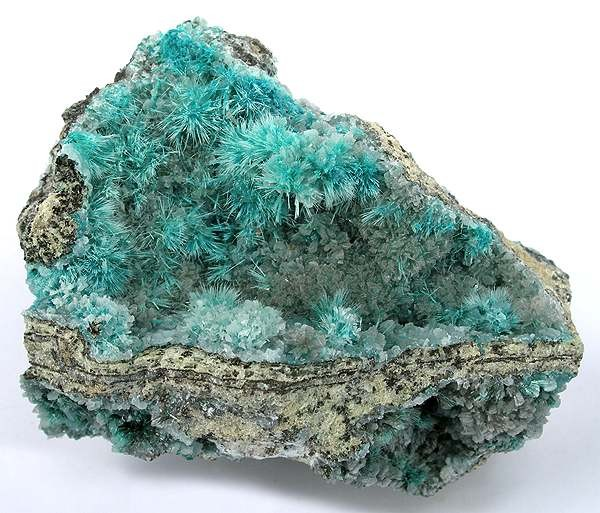
Aurichalcite needles spraying out within a protected pocket lined by bladed calcite crystals

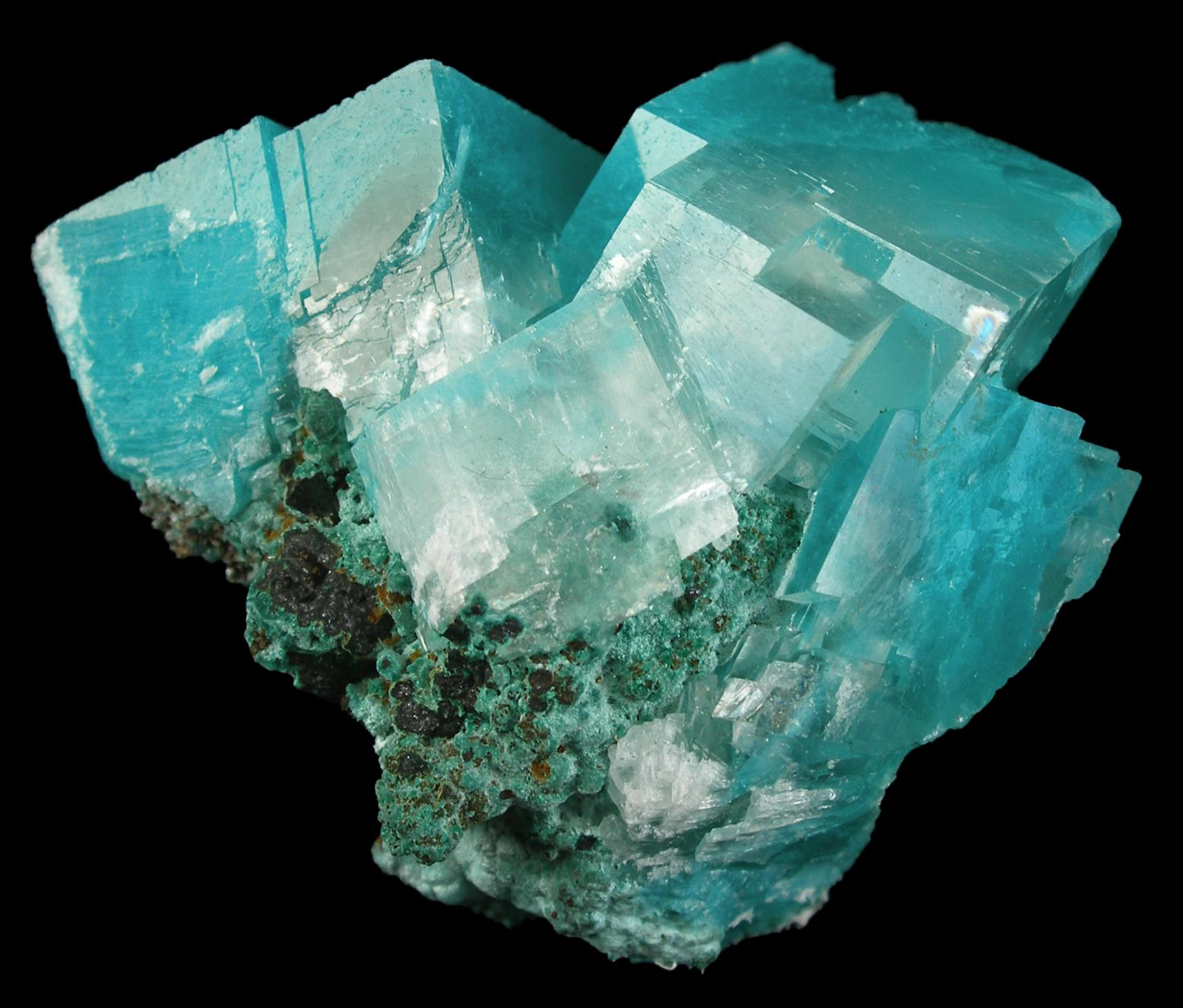
Aurichalcite crystals in calcite

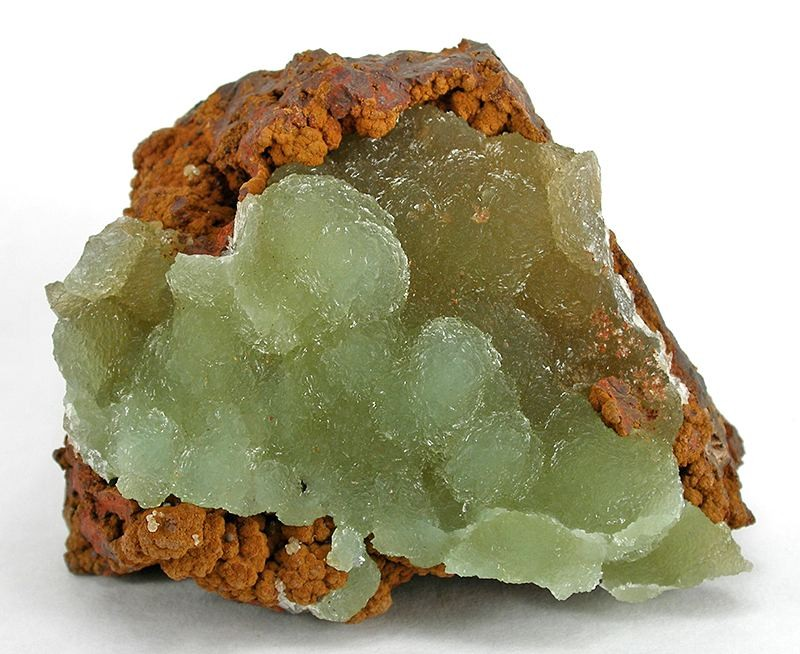
Austinite, from Durango, Mexico

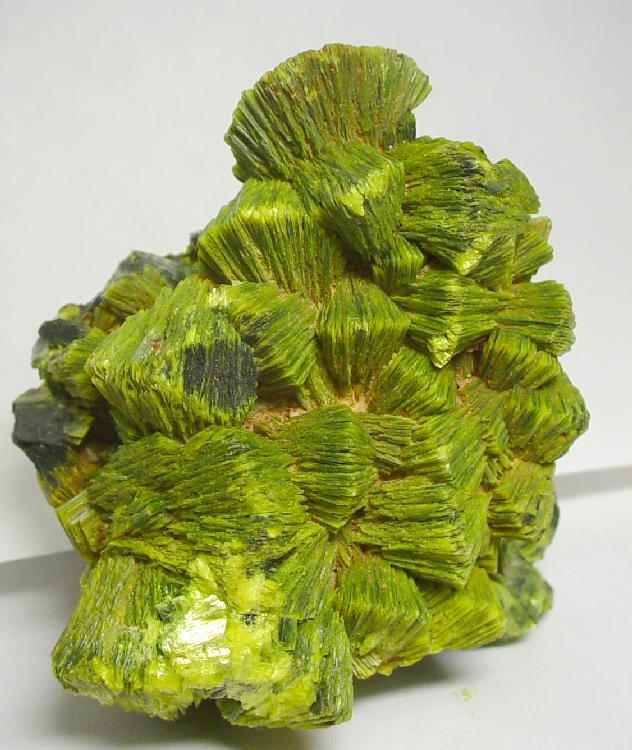
Autunite, 6.5 × 5.5 × 4 cm, Daybreak Mine, Spokane County, Washington, US

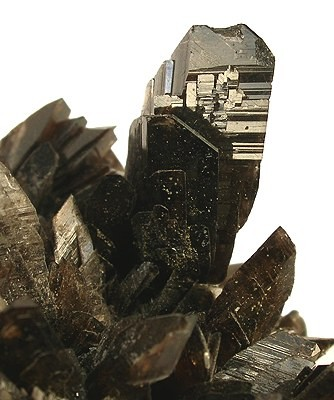
Axinite-(Mn), with sharp curving crystals to 4 cm. West Bor Pit at Dalnegorsk, Russia

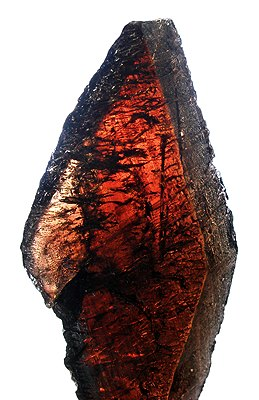
Axinite-(Mn), Vitória da Conquista, Bahia, Brazil size 5.5 × 2.4 × 0.8 cm

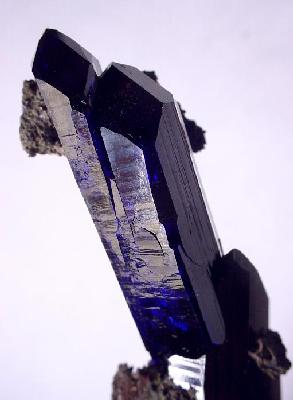
Exceptionally large azurite crystal, 6 × 2 × 2 cm, Tsumeb, Namibia

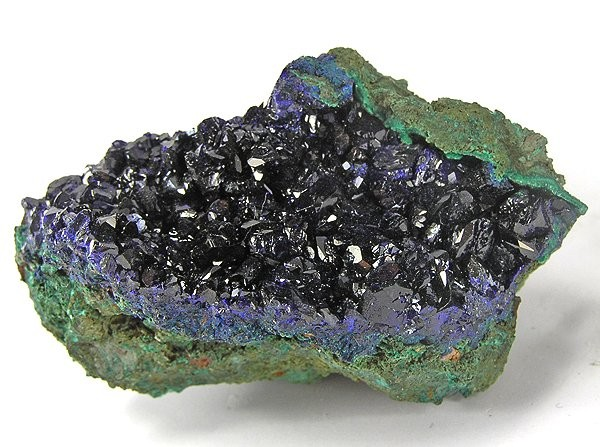
Deep blue, sparkly crystals of azurite in a shallow vug, on a matrix of azurite

1. Abellaite (IMA2014-111) 5.BE. [no] [no]
  (IUPAC: sodium dilead hydro dicarbonate)
2. Abelsonite (IMA1975-013) 10.CA.20
  (IUPAC: a nickel porphyrine derivative)
3. Abenakiite-(Ce) (IMA1991-054) 9.CK.10 [no]
4. Abernathyite (natroautunite: 1956) 8.EB.15
5. Abhurite (IMA1983-061) 3.DA.30
6. Abramovite (IMA2006-016) 2.HF.25a
  (IUPAC: dilead tin indium heptasulfa bismuthide)
7. Abswurmbachite (braunite: IMA1990-007) 9.AG.05
  (IUPAC: copper(II) hexamanganese(III) octaoxo tetraoxosilicate)
8. Abuite (IMA2014-084) 8.B0. [no] [no]
  (IUPAC: calcium dialuminium difluoro diphosphate)
9. Acanthite (acanthite: 1855) 2.BA.35
  (IUPAC: disilver sulfide)
10. Acetamide (IMA1974-039) 10.AA.20
  (IUPAC: acetic acid amide)
11. Achalaite (wodginite: IMA2013-103) 4.D0. [no] [no]
  (IUPAC: iron(II) titanium diniobium octaoxide)
12. Achávalite (nickeline: 1939) 2.CC.05 [no]
  (IUPAC: iron selenide)
13. Achyrophanite (IMA2018-011) 8.0 [no] [no]
14. Acmonidesite (IMA2013-068) 7.AC. [no] [no]
15. Actinolite^{I} [Ca-amphibole: IMA2012 s.p., actynolite (1794)] 9.DE.10
16. Acuminite (tikhonenkovite: IMA1986-038) 3.CC.10
  (IUPAC: strontium hydro tetrafluoroaluminate monohydrate)
17. Adachiite (tourmaline: IMA2012-101) 9.CK. [no]
18. Adamite (andalusite: 1866) 8.BB.30
  (IUPAC: dizinc hydro arsenate)
19. Adamsite-(Y) (IMA1999-020) 5.CC.30
  (IUPAC: sodium yttrium dicarbonate hexahydrate)
20. Adanite (IMA2019-088) 7.0 [no] [no]
  (IUPAC: dilead tellurite sulfate)
21. Addibischoffite (sapphirine: IMA2015-006) 4.BC. [no] [no]
22. Adelite (Y: 1891) 8.BH.35
  (IUPAC: calcium magnesium hydro arsenate)
23. Admontite (IMA1978-012) 6.FA.15
  (IUPAC: magnesio decaoxo hexaborate heptahydrate)
24. Adolfpateraite (IMA2011-042) 7.EC. [no]
  (IUPAC: potassium uranyl hydro sulfate water)
25. Adranosite 7.BC.
  1. Adranosite (IMA2008-057) 7.BC.
  2. Adranosite-(Fe) (IMA2011-006) 7.BC. [no]
26. Adrianite (IMA2014-028) 9.AD. [no] [no]
27. Aegirine (pyroxene: IMA1998 s.p., 1835) 9.DA.25
  (IUPAC: sodium iron(III) hexaoxy disilicate)
28. Aegirine-augite^{I} (pyroxene: IMA1988 s.p., 1988 Rd) 9.DA.20 [no] [no]
29. Aenigmatite (sapphirine: IMA1967 s.p., 1865) 9.DH.40
30. Aerinite (IMA1988 s.p., 1876 Rd) 9.DB.45
31. Aerugite (IMA1965 s.p., 1858 Rd) 8.BC.15
32. Aeschynite 04.DF.05
  1. Aeschynite-(Ce) (IMA1987 s.p., 1830) 4.DF.05
  2. Aeschynite-(Nd) (IMA1987 s.p., 1982) 4.DF.05
  3. Aeschynite-(Y) (IMA1987 s.p., 1906) 4.DF.05
33. Afghanite (cancrinite-sodalite: IMA1967-041) 9.FB.05
34. Afmite (IMA2005-025a) 8.DD.15 [no]
35. Afwillite (spurrite-afwillite: 1925) 9.AG.75
  (IUPAC: tricalcium tetraoxysilicate dihydroxosilicate dihydrate)
36. Agaite (tellurium oxysalt: IMA2011-115) 7.D?. [no] [no]
  (IUPAC: trilead copper(II) tellurium(VI) dihydro pentaoxide carbonate)
37. Agakhanovite-(Y) (milarite: IMA2013-090) 9.CM. [no] [no]
38. Agardite 08.DL.15
  (IUPAC: REE hexacopper(II) hexahydro triarsenate trihydrate)
  1. Agardite-(Ce) (mixite: IMA2003-030) 8.DL.15 [no]
  2. Agardite-(La) (mixite: IMA1980-092) 8.DL.15
  3. Agardite-(Nd) (mixite: IMA2010-056) 8.DL.15
  4. Agardite-(Y) (mixite: IMA1968-021) 8.DL.15
39. Agmantinite (wurtzite: IMA2014-083) 2.CB. [no] [no]
  (IUPAC: disilver manganese tetrasulfa stannide)
40. Agrellite (IMA1973-032) 9.DH.75
  (IUPAC: sodium dicalcium fluoro decaoxo tetrasilicate)
41. Agricolaite (IMA2009-081) 5.ED.50 [no] [no]
  (IUPAC: tetrapotassium uranyl tricarbonate)
42. Agrinierite (compreignacite: IMA1971-046) 4.GB.05
43. Aguilarite (acanthite: 1891) 2.BA.55
  (IUPAC: tetrasilver selenide sulfide)
  1. Monoclinic ‘acanthite-like’ series (from Ag_{2}S-Ag_{2}S_{0.4}Se_{0.6})
  2. Orthorhombic ‘naumannite-like’ series (from Ag_{2}S_{0.3}Se_{0.7}-Ag_{2}Se)
44. Aheylite (turquoise: IMA1984-036) 8.DD.15
45. Ahlfeldite (cobaltomenite: 1935) 4.JH.10
  (IUPAC: nickel selenite(IV) dihydrate)
46. Ahrensite (spinel, ringwoodite: IMA2013-028) 9.AC. [no] [no]
  (SiFe_{2}O_{4})
47. Aikinite (meneghinite: 1843) 2.HB.05a
  (IUPAC: copper lead trisulfa bismuthide)
48. Aiolosite (apatite: IMA2008-015) 7.BD.20 [no]
49. Airdite (IMA020-046) 8.CJ. [no] [no]
50. Ajoite (ajoite: 1958) 9.EA.70
51. Akaganéite (hollandite, coronadite: IMA1962-004) 4.DK.05
52. Akaogiite (baddeleyite: IMA2007-058) 4.D0. [no] [no]
  (IUPAC: titanium dioxide)
53. Akatoreite (IMA1969-015) 9.BH.15
54. Akdalaite (nolanite: IMA1969-002) 4.FL.70
55. Åkermanite (melilite: 1884) 9.BB.10
  (IUPAC: dicalcium magnesium heptaoxo disilicate)
56. Akhtenskite (ramsdellite: IMA1982-072) 4.DB.15b
  (IUPAC: manganese dioxide)
57. Akimotoite (corundum: IMA1997-044) 4.CB.05 [no]
  (IUPAC: magnesium trioxo silicate)
58. Aklimaite (IMA2011-050) 9.0 [no]
  (IUPAC: tetracalcium [pentaoxodisilicate dihydroxyl] tetrahydroxyl pentahydrate)
59. Akopovaite (hydrotalcite: IMA2018-095) 5.0 [no] [no]
60. Akrochordite (Y: 1922) 8.DD.10
  (IUPAC: pentamanganese(II) tetrahydro diarsenate tetrahydrate)
61. Aksaite (IMA1967 s.p., 1962) 6.FA.05
  (IUPAC: magnesium hexahydro heptaoxo hexaborate dihydrate)
62. Aktashite (nowackiite: IMA2008 s.p., 1968) 2.GA.30

=== Al – An ===
1. Alabandite (galena, rocksalt: 1822) 2.CD.10
  (IUPAC: manganese(II) sulfide)
2. Alacránite (IMA1985-033) 2.FA.20
  (IUPAC: octarsenic nonasulfide)
3. Alamosite (Y: 1909) 9.DO.20
  (IUPAC: lead trioxysilicate)
4. Alarsite (quartz: IMA1993-003) 8.AA.05
  (IUPAC: aluminium arsenate)
5. Albertiniite (IMA2015-004) 4.JE. [no] [no]
  (IUPAC: iron(II) sulfite trihydrate)
6. Albite (feldspar: 1815) 9.FA.35
  (IUPAC: sodium (octaoxy alumotrisilicate))
7. Albrechtschraufite (IMA1983-078) 5.ED.15
8. Alburnite (argyrodite: IMA2012-073) 2.BA. [no] [no]
  (IUPAC: octasilver germanium ditelluride tetrasulfide)
9. Alcantarillaite (IMA2019-072) 8.0 [no] [no]
10. Alcaparrosaite (alcaparrosaite: IMA2011-024) 7.DF. [no]
11. Aldermanite (IMA1980-044) 8.DE.35
  (Mg_{5}Al_{12}(PO_{4})_{8}(OH)_{22}·32H_{2}O)
12. Aldomarinoite (brackebuschite: IMA2021-054) 8.BG. [no] [no]
13. Aldridgeite (devilline: IMA2010-029) 7.DF. [no] [no]
14. Aleksandrovite (baratovite: IMA2009-004) 9.CJ.25 [no]
  (KCa_{7}Sn_{2}Li_{3}Si_{12}O_{36}F_{2})
15. Aleksite (tetradymite: IMA1977-038) 2.GC.40a
  (IUPAC: lead dibismuth ditelluride disulfide)
16. Aleutite (IMA2018-014) 8.0 [no] [no]
17. Alexkhomyakovite (IMA2015-013) 05.DA. [no] [no]
  (IUPAC: hexapotassium (dicalcium sodium) chloro pentacarbonate hexahydrate)
18. Alexkuznetsovite 9.B
  1. Alexkuznetsovite-(Ce) (biraite: IMA2019-118) 9.B [no] [no]
  2. Alexkuznetsovite-(La) (biraite: IMA2019-081) 9.B [no] [no]
19. Alflarsenite (zeolitic tectosilicate: IMA2008-023) 9.G?.
20. Alforsite (apatite: IMA1980-039) 8.BN.05
  (IUPAC: pentabarium chloro triphosphate)
21. Alfredopetrovite (IMA2015-026) 7.CA. [no] [no]
  (IUPAC: dialuminium triselenite(IV) hexahydrate)
22. Alfredstelznerite (IMA2007-050) 6.D0.
23. Algodonite (metalloid alloy: 1857) 2.AA.10a
24. Alicewilsonite (mckelveyite) 5.CC.
  1. Alicewilsonite-(YCe) (mckelveyite: IMA2020-055) 5.CC. [no] [no]
  2. Alicewilsonite-(YLa) (mckelveyite: IMA2021-047) 5.CC. [no] [no] [no]
25. Aliettite (corrensite: 1969) 9.EC.60
26. Allabogdanite (barringerite: IMA2000-038) 1.BD.15 [no]
  (IUPAC: di(iron,nickel) phosphide)
27. Allactite (allactite: IMA1980 s.p., 1884) 8.BE.30
  (IUPAC: heptamanganese(II) octahydro diarsenate)
28. Allanite 9.BG.05b
  1. Allanite-(Ce) (epidote, allanite: IMA1987 s.p., 1812) 9.BG.05b
  2. Allanite-(La) (epidote, allanite: IMA2003-065) 9.BG.05b
  3. Allanite-(Nb) (epidote, allanite: IMA2010-060) 9.BG.05b [no] [no]
  4. Allanite-(Y) (epidote, allanite: IMA1966 s.p., 1949) 9.BG.05b [no]
29. Allanpringite (wavellite: IMA2004-050) 8.DC.50 [no]
  (IUPAC: triiron(III) trihydro diphosphate pentahydrate)
30. Allargentum (allargentum: IMA1970 s.p., 1950 Rd) 2.AA.30
31. Alleghanyite (humite: 1932) 9.AF.45
  (IUPAC: pentamanganese(II) di(tetraoxysilicate) dihydroxyl)
32. Allendeite (IMA2007-027) 4.CC. [no]
  (IUPAC: tetrascandium trizirconium dodecaoxide)
33. Allochalcoselite (IMA2004-025) 4.JG.40
  (IUPAC: copper(I) pentacopper(II) lead pentachloro dioxodiselenite)
34. Alloclasite (lollingite: 1865) 2.EB.10b
  (IUPAC: cobalt arsenide sulfide)
35. Allophane (allophane: 1816) 9.ED.20
36. Alloriite (cancrinite: IMA2006-020) 9.FB.05
37. Alluaivite (eudialyte: IMA1988-052) 9.CO.10
38. Alluaudite (alluaudite: IMA1979 s.p., 1848 Rd) 8.AC.10
  (NaMn(Fe^{3+})_{2}(PO_{4})_{3})
39. Almandine (garnet, garnet: old/ 1546?) 9.AD.25
40. Almarudite (milarite: IMA2002-048) 9.CM.05 [no]
41. Almeidaite (crichtonite: IMA2013-020) 4.C?. [no] [no]
42. Alnaperbøeite-(Ce) (gatelite: IMA2012-054) 9.B?. [no] [no]
43. Alpeite (ardennite: IMA2016-072) 9.B?. [no] [no]
44. Alpersite (melanterite: IMA2003-040) 7.CB.35 [no] [no]
  (IUPAC: magnesium sulfate heptahydrate)
45. Alsakharovite-Zn (labuntsovite: IMA2002-003) 9.CE.30h [no]
46. Alstonite (alstonite: 1841) 5.AB.35
  (IUPAC: barium calcium dicarbonate)
47. Altaite (galena, rocksalt: 1845) 2.CD.10
  (IUPAC: lead telluride)
48. Alterite (sulfate-oxalate: IMA2018-070) 10.0 [no] [no]
  (IUPAC: dizinc tetrairon(III) tetrahydro tetrasulfate dioxalate heptadecahydrate)
49. Althausite (IMA1974-050) 8.BB.25
  (Mg_{4}(PO_{4})_{2}(OH,O)(F,☐))
50. Althupite (IMA1986-003) 8.EC.25
51. Altisite (lemoynite: IMA1993-055) 9.DP.40 [no]
52. Alum (chemical compound)
  1. Alum-(K) (IMA2007 s.p., 1951, 77 CE) 7.CC.20
    (IUPAC: potassium aluminium disulfate dodecahydrate)
  2. Alum-(Na) (IMA2007 s.p., 1951, 77 CE) 7.CC.20
    (IUPAC: sodium aluminium disulfate dodecahydrate)
53. Aluminite (aluminite: old/ 1805) 7.DC.05
  (IUPAC: dialuminium tetrahydro sulfate heptahydrate)
54. Aluminium (IMA1980-085a) 1.AA.05
55. Aluminoceladonite (mica: IMA1998 s.p.) 9.EC.15 [no]
56. Aluminocerite-(Ce) (whitlockite: IMA2007-060) 9.AG.20 [no]
57. Aluminocopiapite (copiapite: 1947) 7.DB.35
58. Aluminocoquimbite (coquimbite: IMA2019-F, IMA2009-095) 7.CB.50 [no]
  (IUPAC: aluminium iron trisulfate nonahydrate)
59. Aluminomagnesiohulsite (hulsite: IMA2002-038) 6.AB.45 [no]
  (IUPAC: dimagnesium aluminium dioxoborate)
60. Alumino-oxy-rossmanite (tourmaline: IMA2020-008b) 9.CK. [no] [no]
61. Aluminopyracmonite (pyracmonite: IMA2012-075) 7.AC. [no] [no]
  (IUPAC: triammonium aluminium trisulfate)
62. Aluminosugilite (milarite: IMA2018-142) 9.CM. [no] [no]
63. Alumoåkermanite (melilite: IMA2008-049) 9.BB.10
64. Alumoedtollite (edtollite: IMA2017-020) 8.AC. [no] [no]
  (IUPAC: dipotassium sodium pentacopper aluminium dioxo tetrarsenate)
65. Alumohydrocalcite (alumohydrocalcite: IMA1980 s.p., 1926) 5.DB.05
  (IUPAC: calcium dialuminium tetrahydro dicarbonate trihydrate)
66. Alumoklyuchevskite (klyuchevskite: IMA1993-004) 7.BC.45
  (IUPAC: tripotassium tricopper(II) aluminium dioxo tetrasulfate)
67. Alumotantite (IMA1980-025) 4.DB.55
  (IUPAC: aluminium tantalum tetraoxide)
68. Alumovesuvianite (vesuvianite: IMA2016-014) 9.BG. [no] [no]
69. Alunite (alunite, alunite: IMA1987 s.p., 1565 Rd) 7.BC.10
  (IUPAC: potassium trialuminium hexahydro disulfate)
70. Alunogen (Y: 1832) 7.CB.45
  (Al_{2}(SO_{4})_{3}(H_{2}O)_{12}·5H_{2}O)
71. Alvanite (chalcoalumite: IMA1962 s.p., 1959) 8.FE.05
  (Zn^{2+}Al_{4}(V^{5+}O_{3})_{2}(OH)_{12}·2H_{2}O)
72. Alwilkinsite-(Y) (IMA2015-097) 7.EB. [no] [no]
  (Y(UO_{2})_{3}(SO_{4})_{2}O(OH)_{3}(H_{2}O)_{7}·7H_{2}O)
73. Amakinite (brucite: IMA1967 s.p., 1962) 4.FE.05
  (IUPAC: iron(II) dihydroxide)
74. Amamoorite (ilvaite: IMA2018-105) 9.B?. [no] [no]
  (IUPAC: calcium dimanganese(II) manganese(III) heptaoxodisilicate oxyhydroxyl)
75. Amarantite (amarantite: 1888) 7.DB.30
  (IUPAC: diiron(III) oxodisulfate heptahydrate)
76. Amarillite (tamarugite: 1933) 7.CC.75
  (IUPAC: sodium iron(III) disulfate hexahydrate)
77. Amblygonite (amblygonite, titanite: 1818) 8.BB.05
  (IUPAC: lithium aluminium fluoro phosphate)
78. Ambrinoite (IMA2009-071) 2.HE.10 [no] [no]
79. Ameghinite (IMA1966-034) 6.CA.10
  (IUPAC: sodium tetrahydro trioxotriborate)
80. Amesite (serpentine: 1876) 9.ED.15
81. Amgaite (IMA2021-104) 7.AC. [no] [no]
82. Amicite (zeolitic tectosilicate: IMA1979-011) 9.GC.05
83. Aminoffite (Y: 1937) 9.BH.05
84. Ammineite (IMA2008-032) 3.C0. [no] [no]
  (IUPAC: copper dichloride · diammine)
85. Ammonioalunite (alunite, alunite: IMA1986-037) 7.BC.10
  (IUPAC: ammonium trialuminium hexahydro disulfate)
86. Ammonioborite (Y: 1931) 6.EA.15
87. Ammoniojarosite (alunite, alunite: IMA1987 s.p., 1927 Rd) 7.BC.10
  (IUPAC: ammonium triiron(III) hexahydro disulfate)
88. Ammoniolasalite (lasalite: IMA2017-094) 4.HC. [no] [no]
89. Ammonioleucite (zeolitic tectosilicate: IMA1984-015) 9.GB.05
90. Ammoniomagnesiovoltaite (voltaite: IMA2009-040) 7.CC.25 [no]
  ((NH_{4})_{2}Mg_{5}Fe^{3+}_{3}Al(SO_{4})_{12}·18H_{2}O)
91. Ammoniomathesiusite (mathesiusite: IMA2017-077) 7.DF. [no] [no]
  ((NH_{4})_{5}(UO_{2})_{4}(SO_{4})_{4}(VO_{5})·4H_{2}O)
92. Ammoniovoltaite (voltaite: IMA2017-022) 7.CC. [no] [no]
  ((NH_{4})_{2}Fe^{2+}_{5}Fe^{3+}_{3}Al(SO_{4})_{12}(H_{2}O)_{18})
93. Ammoniotinsleyite (leucophosphite: IMA2019-128) 8.0 [no] [no]
94. Ammoniozippeite (zippeite: IMA2017-073) 7.0 [no] [no]
  ((NH_{4})_{2}[(UO_{2})_{2}(SO_{4})O_{2}]·H_{2}O)
95. Amstallite (IMA1986-030) 9.DP.25
96. Analcime (zeolitic tectosilicate: IMA1997 s.p., 1797) 9.GB.05
97. Anandite (mica: IMA1966-005) 9.EC.35
98. Anapaite (Y: 1902) 8.CH.10
  (IUPAC: dicalcium iron(II) diphosphate tetrahydrate)
99. Anatase (IMA1962 s.p., 1801) 4.DD.05
  (IUPAC: titanium dioxide)
100. Anatolyite (yurmarinite: IMA2016-040) 8.0 [no] [no]
101. Ancylite 05.DC.05
  1. Ancylite-(Ce) (IMA1987 s.p., 1901) 5.DC.05
    (IUPAC: cerium strontium hydro dicarbonate monohydrate)
  2. Ancylite-(La) (IMA1995-053) 5.DC.05
    (IUPAC: lanthanum strontium hydro dicarbonate monohydrate)
102. Andalusite (andalusite: 1798) 9.AF.10
103. Andersonite (Y: 1951) 5.ED.30
104. Andorite 2.JB.40a
  (IUPAC: silver lead hexasulfa triantimonide)
105. Andradite (garnet, garnet: 1800) 9.AD.25
106. Andreadiniite (lillianite: IMA2014-049) 2.0 [no] [no]
  (CuHgAg_{7}Pb_{7}Sb_{24}S_{48})
107. Andrémeyerite (IMA1972-005) 9.BB.20
  (IUPAC: barium diiron(II) heptaoxysilicate)
108. Andreyivanovite (phosphide: IMA2006-003) 1.BD.15 [no]
  (IUPAC: iron chromium phosphide)
109. Andrianovite (eudialyte: IMA2007-008) 9.CO.10 [no] [no]
110. Anduoite (Y: 1979) 2.EB.15a
  (IUPAC: ruthenium diarsenide)
111. Andychristyite (tellurium oxysalt: IMA2015-024) 7.CC. [no] [no]
  (PbCu^{2+}Te^{6+}O_{5}(H_{2}O))
112. Andymcdonaldite (tapiolite: IMA2018-141) 4.0 [no] [no]
  (IUPAC: diiron tellurium hexaoxide)
113. Andyrobertsite (andyrobertsite: IMA1997-023) 8.DH.50
  (KCdCu_{5}(AsO_{4})_{4}[As(OH)_{2}O_{2}]·2H_{2}O)
114. Angarfite (IMA2010-082) 8.AC. [no]
  (IUPAC: sodium pentairon(III) tetrahydro tetraphosphate tetrahydrate)
115. Angastonite (IMA2008-008) 8.DL.25 [no]
  (IUPAC: calcium magnesium dialuminium tetrahydro diphosphate heptahydrate)
116. Ángelaite (kobellite: IMA2003-064) 2.JB.25f [no]
  (IUPAC: dicopper silver lead bismuth tetrasulfide)
117. Angelellite (IMA1962 s.p., 1959) 8.BC.05
  (IUPAC: tetrairon(III) trioxodiarsenate)
118. Anglesite (baryte: 1832) 7.AD.35
  (IUPAC: lead sulfate)
119. Anhydrite (Y: 1795) 7.AD.30
  (IUPAC: anhydrous calcium sulfate)
120. Anhydrokainite^{Q} (chlorothionite: 1912) 7.BC.80 [no] [no]
  (IUPAC: potassium magnesium chloro sulfate)
121. Anilite (digenite: IMA1968-030) 2.BA.10
  (IUPAC: heptacopper tetrasulfide)
122. Ankerite (dolomite: 1825) 5.AB.10
  (IUPAC: calcium (iron(II),magnesium) dicarbonate)
123. Ankinovichite (chalcoalumite: IMA2002-063) 8.FE.05
  (NiAl_{4}(V^{5+}O_{3})_{2}(OH)_{12}·2H_{2}O)
124. Annabergite (vivianite: 1852) 8.CE.40
  (IUPAC: trinickel diarsenate octahydrate)
125. Annite (mica: IMA1998 s.p., 1868) 9.EC.20
  (IUPAC: potassium triiron(II) (decaoxyaluminotrisilicate) dihydroxyl)
126. Anorpiment (IMA2011-014) 2.FA. [no]
  (IUPAC: diarsenic trisulfide)
127. Anorthite (feldspar: 1823) 9.FA.35
  (IUPAC: calcium (octaoxy dialumodisilicate))
128. Anorthoclase^{I} (Y: 1885) 9.FA.30
129. Anorthominasragrite (minasragrite: IMA2001-040) 7.DB.20 [no]
  (IUPAC: vanadium(IV) oxosulfate pentahydrate)
130. Anorthoroselite (fairfieldite: 1955, Rn) 8.CG.10
  (IUPAC: dicalcium cobalt diarsenate dihydrate)
131. Ansermetite (IMA2002-017) 4.HD.30 [no]
  (IUPAC: manganese(II) divanadium(V) hexaoxide tetrahydrate)
132. Antarcticite (IMA1965-015) 3.BB.30
  (IUPAC: calcium dichloride hexahydrate)
133. Anthoinite (anthoinite: 1947) 7.GB.35
134. Anthonyite (anthonyite: IMA1967 s.p., 1963) 3.DA.40
  (IUPAC: copper(II) dihydroxide trihydrate)
135. Anthophyllite [Mg-Fe-Mn-amphibole: IMA2012 s.p., 1801] 9.DD.05
136. Antigorite (serpentine: IMA1998 s.p., 1840 Rd) 9.ED.15
137. Antimonselite (stibnite: IMA1992-003) 2.DB.05
  (IUPAC: diantimony triselenide)
138. Antimony (arsenic: 1748) 1.CA.05
139. Antipinite (IMA2014-027) 10.0 [no] [no]
  (IUPAC: potassium trisodium dicopper tetraoxalate)
140. Antlerite (IMA1968 s.p., 1889) 7.BB.15
  (IUPAC: tricopper(II) tetrahydro sulfate)
141. Antofagastaite (syngenite: IMA2018-049) 7.0 [no] [no]
  (IUPAC: tetrasodium dicalcium tetrasulfate trihydrate)
142. Anyuiite (khatyrkite: IMA1987-053) 1.AA.15
  (IUPAC: gold dilead alloy)
143. Anzaite-(Ce) (IMA2013-004) 4.CC. [no] [no]
  (Ce_{4}Fe^{2+}Ti_{6}O_{18}(OH)_{2})

=== Ap – Az ===
1. Apachite (IMA1979-022) 9.HE.10
  (For the apatite series, see hydroxylapatite, fluorapatite, and chlorapatite)
2. Apexite (struvite: IMA2015-002) 8.CA. [no] [no]
  (IUPAC: sodium magnesium phosphate nonahydrate)
3. Aphthitalite (aphthitalite: 1813) 7.AC.35
  (IUPAC: tripotassium sodium disulfate)
4. Apjohnite (halotrichite: 1847) 7.CB.85
  (Mn^{2+}Al_{2}(SO_{4})_{4}·22H_{2}O)
5. Aplowite (starkeyite: IMA1963-009) 7.CB.15
  (IUPAC: cobalt(II) sulfate tetrahydrate)
6. Apuanite (trippkeite: IMA1978-069) 4.JA.25
7. Aqualite (eudialyte: IMA2002-066) 9.CO.10
8. Aradite (zadovite, arctite: IMA2013-047) 8.0 [no] [no]
  (BaCa_{6}[(SiO_{4})(PO_{4})](VO_{4})_{2}F)
9. Aragonite (aragonite: 1788) 5.AB.15
  (IUPAC: calcium carbonate)
10. Arakiite (hematolite: IMA1998-062) 8.BE.45
11. Aramayoite (aramayoite: 1926) 2.HA.25
12. Arangasite (IMA2012-018) 8.DB. [no]
  (IUPAC: dialuminium fluoro sulfate phosphate nonahydrate)
13. Arapovite (steacyite: IMA2003-046) 9.CH.10
14. Aravaipaite (aravaipaite: IMA1988-021) 3.DC.35
  (IUPAC: trilead aluminium nonafluoride monohydrate)
15. Aravaite (arctite: IMA2018-078) 9.0 [no] [no]
16. Arcanite (arcanite: 1845) 7.AD.05
  (IUPAC: dipotassium sulfate)
17. Archerite (biphosphammite: IMA1975-008) 8.AD.15
  (IUPAC: potassium phosphoric acid)
18. Arctite (arctite: IMA1980-049) 8.BN.10
  (IUPAC: (pentasodium calcium) hexacalcium barium trifluoro hexaphosphate)
19. Arcubisite (IMA1973-009) 2.LA.40
  (IUPAC: hexasilver copper bismuth tetrasulfide)
20. Ardaite (madocite: IMA1979-073) 2.LB.30
21. Ardealite (gypsum: 1932) 8.CJ.50
  (IUPAC: dicalcium hydroxophosphate sulfate tetrahydrate)
22. Ardennite 9.BJ.40
  1. Ardennite-(As) (IMA2007 s.p., 1872) 9.BJ.40
  2. Ardennite-(V) (IMA2005-037) 9.BJ.40
23. Arfvedsonite [Na-amphibole: IMA2012 s.p., arfwedsonite (1823)] 9.DE.25
24. Argandite (allactite: IMA2010-021) 8.BE.30 [no] [no]
  (IUPAC: heptamanganese octahydro divanadate)
25. Argentobaumhauerite (sartorite: IMA2015-F, IMA1988-051) 2.HC.05b
26. Argentodufrénoysite (sartorite: IMA2016-046) 2.0 [no] [no]
27. Argentojarosite (alunite, alunite: IMA1987 s.p., 1923) 7.BC.10
  (IUPAC: silver triiron(III) hexahydro disulfate)
28. Argentoliveingite (sartorite: IMA2016-029) 2.0 [no] [no]
29. Argentopentlandite (pentlandite: IMA1970-047) 2.BB.15
  (Ag(Fe,Ni)_{8}S_{8})
30. Argentopearceite (pearceite-polybasite: IMA2020-049) [no] [no]
31. Argentopolybasite-T2ac (IMA2021-119)
32. Argentopyrite (cubanite: 1866) 2.CB.65
  (IUPAC: silver diiron trisulfide)
33. Argentotennantite-(Zn) (tetrahedrite: IMA2018-K, IMA1985-026) 2.GB.05
  (Ag_{6}(Cu_{4}Zn_{2})As_{4}S_{13})
34. Argentotetrahedrite (tetrahedrite) 2.GB.05
  1. Argentotetrahedrite-(Cd) (IMA2022-053) 2.GB.05 [no] [no]
  2. Argentotetrahedrite-(Fe) (IMA2018-K, IMA2016-093) 2.GB.05 [no] [no]
    (Ag_{6}(Cu_{4}Fe_{2})Sb_{4}S_{12}S)
  3. Argentotetrahedrite-(Hg) (IMA2020-079) 2.GB.05 [no] [no]
    (Ag_{6}(Cu_{4}Hg_{2})Sb_{4}S_{12}S)
  4. Argentotetrahedrite-(Zn) (IMA2020-069) 2.GB.05 [no] [no]
    (Ag_{6}(Cu_{4}Zn_{2})Sb_{4}S_{12}S)
35. Argesite (IMA2011-072) 3.0 [no] [no]
  (IUPAC: heptammonium tribismuth hexadecachloride)
36. Argutite (rutile: IMA1980-067) 4.DB.05
  (IUPAC: germanium dioxide)
37. Argyrodite (argyrodite: 1886) 2.BA.70
  (IUPAC: octasilver germanium hexasulfide)
38. Arhbarite (gilmarite: IMA1981-044) 8.BE.25
  (IUPAC: dicopper magnesium trihydro arsenate)
39. Ariegilatite (nabimusaite, arctite: IMA2016-100) 9.A?. [no] [no]
40. Arisite 5.BD.18
  1. Arisite-(Ce) (IMA2009-013) 5.BD.18 [no]
  2. Arisite-(La) (IMA2009-019) 5.BD.18 [no]
41. Aristarainite (IMA1973-029) 6.FB.05
42. Armalcolite (pseudobrookite: IMA1970-006 Rd) 4.CB.15
43. Armangite (Y: 1920) 4.JB.20
44. Armbrusterite (IMA2005-035) 9.EG.65 [no]
45. Armellinoite-(Ce) (pottsite: IMA2018-094) 8.CG. [no] [no]
46. Armenite (milarite: 1939) 9.CM.05
47. Armstrongite (IMA1972-018) 9.EA.35
48. Arrheniusite-(Ce) (IMA2019-086) 9.A?. [no] [no]
49. Arrojadite 8.BF.05
  1. Arrojadite-(BaNa) (IMA2014-071) 8.BF.05 [no] [no]
  2. Arrojadite-(KFe) (IMA2005 s.p., 1925) 8.BF.05
  3. Arrojadite-(KNa) (IMA2005-047) 8.BF.05
  4. Arrojadite-(PbFe) (IMA2005-056) 8.BF.05 [no]
  5. Arrojadite-(SrFe) (IMA2005-032) 8.BF.05 [no]
50. Arsenatrotitanite (titanite: IMA2016-015) 8.0 [no] [no]
51. Arsenbrackebuschite (brackebuschite: IMA1977-014) 8.BG.05
52. Arsendescloizite (adelite: IMA1979-030) 8.BH.35
53. Arsenic (arsenic: old) 1.CA.05
54. Arseniopleite (alluaudite: IMA1967 s.p., 1888) 8.AC.10
  (NaCaMnMn_{2}(AsO_{4})_{3})
55. Arseniosiderite (arseniosiderite: 1842) 8.DH.30
56. Arsenmarcobaldiite (geocronite: IMA2016-045) 2.0 [no] [no]
57. Arsenmedaite (medaite: IMA2016-099) 9.BJ. [no] [no]
  (IUPAC: hexamanganese(II) arsenopentasilicate octadecaoxy hydroxyl)
58. Arsenoclasite (arsenoclasite: 1931) 8.BD.10
  (IUPAC: pentamanganese(II) tetrahydro diarsenate)
59. Arsenocrandallite (alunite, crandallite: IMA1980-060) 8.BL.10
  (IUPAC: calcium trialuminium hexahydro arsenate hydroxoarsenate)
60. Arsenoflorencite 8.BL.13
  (IUPAC: REE trialuminium hexahydro diarsenate)
  1. Arsenoflorencite-(Ce) (alunite, crandallite: IMA1985-053) 8.BL.13
  2. Arsenoflorencite-(La) (alunite, crandallite: IMA2009-078) 8.BL.13
  3. Arsenoflorencite-(Nd)^{N} (alunite, crandallite: 1991) 8.BL.13 [no] [no]
61. Arsenogorceixite (alunite, crandallite: IMA1989-055) 8.BL.10
  (IUPAC: barium trialuminium hexahydro arsenate hydroxoarsenate)
62. Arsenogoyazite (alunite, crandallite: IMA1983-043) 8.BL.10
  (IUPAC: strontium trialuminium hexahydro arsenate hydroxoarsenate)
63. Arsenohauchecornite (hauchecornite: IMA1978-E) 2.BB.10
64. Arsenohopeite (hopeite: IMA2010-069) 8.CA.30 [no]
  (IUPAC: trizinc diarsenate tetrahydrate)
65. Arsenolamprite (Y: 1886) 1.CA.10
66. Arsenolite (arsenolite: 1854) 4.CB.50
  (IUPAC: diarsenic trioxide)
67. Arsenopalladinite (stillwatterite: IMA1973-002a, 1955) 2.AC.10c
  (IUPAC: octapalladium triarsenide)
68. Arsenopyrite (arsenopyrite: IMA1962 s.p., 1847) 2.EB.20
  (IUPAC: iron arsenide sulfide)
69. Arsenotučekite (hauchecornite: IMA2019-135) 2.0 [no] [no]
70. Arsenovanmeersscheite (IMA2006-018) 8.EC.20 [no]
  (IUPAC: uranium triuranyl hexahydro diarsenate tetrahydrate)
71. Arsenoveszelyite (IMA2021-076a) 8.DE. [no] [no]
72. Arsenowagnerite (wagnerite: IMA2014-100) 8.BB. [no] [no]
  (IUPAC: dimagnesium fluoro arsenate)
73. Arsenquatrandorite (lillianite: IMA2012-087) 2.0 [no] [no]
74. Arsentsumebite (brackebuschite: 1935) 8.BG.05
75. Arsenudinaite (IMA2018-067) 8.0 [no] [no]
  (IUPAC: sodium tetramagnesium triarsenate)
76. Arsenuranospathite (IMA1982 s.p.?, 1978) 8.EB.25
  (IUPAC: aluminium diuranyl fluoro diarsenate icosahydrate)
77. Arsenuranylite (phosphuranylite: 1958) 8.EC.10
  (IUPAC: calcium tetrauranyl tetrahydro diarsenate hexahydrate)
78. Arsiccioite (routhierite: IMA2013-058) 2.0 [no]
  (IUPAC: silver dimercury thallium hexasulfa diarsenide)
79. Arsmirandite (arsmirandite: IMA2014-081) 8.0 [no] [no]
80. Arthurite (arthurite: IMA1964-002) 8.DC.15
  (IUPAC: copper diiron(III) dihydro diarsenate tetrahydrate)
81. Artinite (artinite: 1902) 5.DA.10
  (IUPAC: dimagnesium dihydro carbonate trihydrate)
82. Artroeite (IMA1993-031) 3.CC.15
  (IUPAC: lead dihydro trifluoroaluminate)
83. Artsmithite (IMA2002-039) 8.BO.40
84. Arupite (vivianite: IMA1988-008) 8.CE.40
  (IUPAC: trinickel diphosphate octahydrate)
85. Arzakite^{N} (Y: 1985) 2.FC.15a
86. Arzrunite^{Q} (Y: 1899) 7.DF.60 [no] [no]
  Note: It might be a mixture.
87. Asbecasite (IMA1965-037) 4.JB.30
  (Ca_{3}TiAs_{6}Be_{2}Si_{2}O_{20})
88. Asbolane (Y: 1841) 4.FL.30
89. Aschamalmite (lillianite: IMA1982-089) 2.JB.40b
  (Pb(6-3x)Bi_{(2+x)}S_{9})
90. Ashburtonite (cerchiaraite: IMA1990-033) 9.CF.05
  (HCu_{4}Pb_{4}Si_{4}O_{12}(HCO_{3})_{4}(OH)_{4}Cl)
91. Ashcroftine-(Y) (IMA1967 s.p., 1933) 9.DN.15
92. Ashoverite (hydroxide: IMA1986-008) 4.FA.10
  (IUPAC: zinc dihydroxide)
93. Asimowite (wadsleyite: IMA2018-102) 9.B?. [no] [no]
  (IUPAC: diiron tetraoxysilicate)
94. Asisite (asisite: IMA1987-003) 3.DB.40
  (IUPAC: heptalead octaoxysilicate dichloride)
95. Åskagenite-(Nd) (epidote: IMA2009-073) 9.BG.05b [no]
96. Aspedamite (menezesite: IMA2011-056) 4.0 [no]
97. Aspidolite (mica: IMA2004-049 Rd) 9.EC.20 [no]
98. Asselbornite (IMA1980-087) 8.ED.10
  (IUPAC: lead tetrauranyl heptahydro tri(bismuth oxide) diarsenate tetrahydrate)
99. Astrocyanite-(Ce) (IMA1989-032) 5.EF.05
  (IUPAC: dicopper dicerium uranyl dihydro pentacarbonate (1.5)hydrate)
100. Astrophyllite (astrophyllite, astrophyllite: 1848) 9.DC.05
101. Atacamite (Y: 1803) 3.DA.10a
  (IUPAC: dicopper trihydro chloride)
102. Atelestite (atelestite: 1832) 8.BO.15
103. Atelisite-(Y) (zircon: IMA2010-065) 9.0 [no]
104. Atencioite (roscherite: IMA2004-041) 8.DA.10 [no]
105. Athabascaite (IMA1969-022) 2.BA.25
  (IUPAC: pentacopper tetraselenide)
106. Atheneite (IMA1973-050) 2.AC.05a
  (IUPAC: dipalladium arsenide)
107. Atlasovite (IMA1986-029) 7.BC.20
108. Atokite (auricupride: IMA1974-041) 1.AG.10
  (IUPAC: tripalladium stannide)
109. Attakolite (IMA1992 s.p., 1868) 8.BH.60
110. Attikaite (IMA2006-017) 8.DJ.45
  (IUPAC: tricalcium dicopper dialuminium tetrahydro tetrarsenate dihydrate)
111. Aubertite (aubertite: IMA1978-051) 7.DB.05
  (IUPAC: copper(II) aluminium chloro disulfate tetradecahydrate)
112. Auerbakhite (IMA2020-047) [no] [no]
113. Augelite (Y: 1868) 8.BE.05
  (IUPAC: dialuminium trihydro phosphate)
114. Augite^{I} (pyroxene: IMA1988 s.p., 1792, 77CE) 9.DA.15
115. Auriacusite (andalusite: IMA2009-037) 8.BB.30 [no]
  (IUPAC: iron(III) copper(II) oxoarsenate)
116. Aurichalcite (Y: 1839) 5.BA.15
  (IUPAC: pentazinc hexahydro dicarbonate)
117. Auricupride (auricupride: 1950) 1.AA.10a
  (IUPAC: tricopper gold alloy)
118. Aurihydrargyrumite (amalgam: IMA2017-003) 1.AD. [no] [no]
  (IUPAC: hexagold pentamercury amalgam)
119. Aurivilliusite (IMA2002-022) 3.DD.50
  (IUPAC: 0.5(dimercury) mercury(II) oxoiodide)
120. Aurorite (IMA1966-031) 4.FL.20
  (IUPAC: manganese(II) manganese(IV) heptaoxide trihydrate)
121. Auroselenide (IMA2022-052) 2.CB. [no] [no]
122. Aurostibite (pyrite: 1952) 2.EB.05a
  (IUPAC: gold diantimonide)
123. Austinite (Y: 1935) 8.BH.35
  (IUPAC: calcium zinc hydro arsenate)
124. Autunite (autunite: 1852) 8.EB.05
  (IUPAC: calcium diuranyl diphosphate (deca - dodeca)hydrate)
125. Avdeevite (beryl: IMA2018-109) 9.CJ. [no] [no]
126. Avdoninite (IMA2005-046a) 3.DA.55
  (IUPAC: dipotassium pentacopper tetrahydro octachloride dihydrate)
127. Averievite (IMA1995-027) 8.BB.85
  (IUPAC: pentacopper dioxo diarsenate · copper dichloride)
128. Avicennite (bixbyite: 1958) 4.CB.10
  (IUPAC: dithallium trioxide)
129. Avogadrite (fluoroborate: 1926) 3.CA.10
  (IUPAC: potassium tetrafluoroborate)
130. Awaruite (auricupride: 1885) 1.AE.20
  (IUPAC: trinickel iron alloy)
131. Axelite (IMA2017-015a) 8.BA. [no] [no]
  (Na_{14}Cu_{7}(AsO_{4})_{8}F_{2}Cl_{2})
132. Axinite 9.BD.20
  1. Axinite-(Fe) (IMA1968 s.p., 1911, 1801) 9.BD.20
  2. Axinite-(Mg) (IMA1975-025, 1975) 9.BD.20
  3. Axinite-(Mn) (Y: 1909) 9.BD.20
133. Azoproite (ludwigite: IMA1970-021) 6.AB.30
134. Azurite (Y: 1832) 5.BA.05
  (IUPAC: tricopper dihydro dicarbonate)
