= Aspidolite =

Phyllosilicate mineral in the trioctahedral mica group

General
- Category: Phyllosilicate minerals
- Group: Mica group, trioctahedral mica group
- Formula: NaMg_{3}AlSi_{3}O_{10}(OH)_{2}
- IMA symbol: Asp
- Crystal system: Monoclinic
- Crystal class: 2/m
- Space group: C2/m
- Unit cell: a = 5.291(8), b = 9.16(2), c = 10.12(2) Å

Identification
- Fracture: Micaceous
- Optical properties: Biaxial (-)

Aspidolite is a mica group phyllosilicate mineral, the sodium analogue of the magnesium-rich mineral phlogopite. The ideal chemical formula for aspidolite is NaMg_{3}AlSi_{3}O_{10}(OH)_{2}.
