= Abuite =

Calcium aluminium phosphate mineral

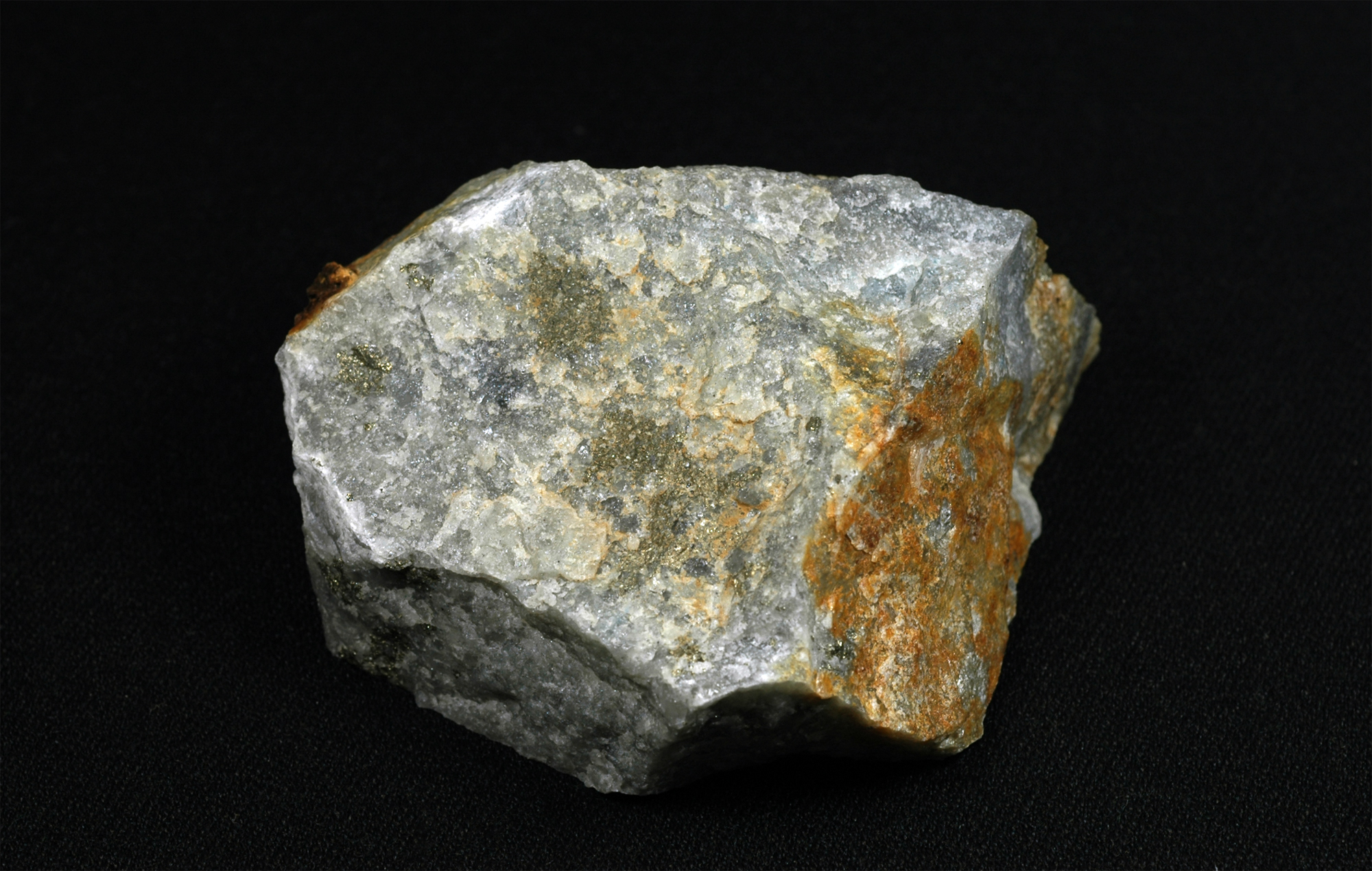

General
- Category: Phosphate minerals
- Formula: CaAl_{2}(PO_{4})_{2}F_{2}
- IMA symbol: Abu
- Strunz classification: 8.B0.
- Crystal system: Orthorhombic
- Crystal class: P2_{1}2_{1}2_{1}

Identification
- Formula mass: 321.98
- Color: Colorless
- Luster: Vitreous
- Streak: White
- Diaphaneity: Transparent
- Density: 3.214 g cm^{−1} (calculated)
- Ultraviolet fluorescence: None

Abuite is a colorless calcium aluminium phosphate mineral with chemical formula CaAl_{2}(PO_{4})F_{2}, occurring in grains 100–500 of µm. It is chemically similar to galliskiite with the exception that it is hydrated, and is included in aluminum phosphate-rich samples, embedded with quartz, augelite, and trolleite It has been primarily found in the Hinomaru–Nago mine, Abu, Yamaguchi Prefecture, Japan, though some gatumbaite deposits may be misidentified abuite according to a 2017 paper by Enju and Uehara.
