= Anthoinite =

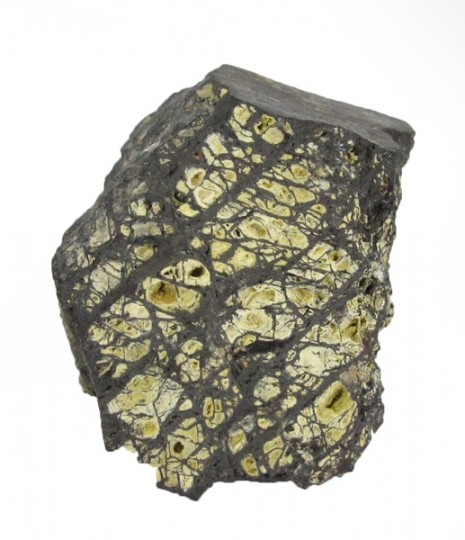
- Anthoinite found in Rwanda

General
- Category: Minerals
- Formula: AlWO_{3}(OH)_{3}
- IMA symbol: Atn

Identification
- Color: White (when free of iron)
- Mohs scale hardness: 1
- Luster: Dull
- Streak: White
- Diaphaneity: Translucent
- Specific gravity: 4.78 - 4.87
- Density: 4.78 - 4.87 g/cm3 (Measured); 4.84 g/cm3 (Calculated)

Anthoinite (IMA symbol: Atn) is an aluminium tungsten oxide mineral with the chemical formula AlWO_{3}(OH)_{3}. Its type locality is Maniema in the Democratic Republic of the Congo.
