= Aliettite =

Phyllosilicate mineral in the smectite group

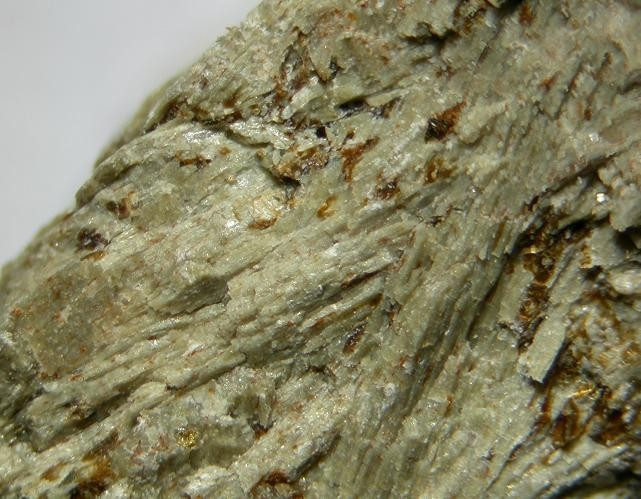
- Aliettite

General
- Category: Phyllosilicate minerals
- Group: Smectite group
- IMA symbol: Ali
- Strunz classification: 9.EC.60
- Crystal system: Hexagonal; Unknown space group
- Unit cell: a = 5.216, c = 24.6 [Å]; Z = 1

Identification
- Color: Colorless, pale yellow or green.
- Crystal habit: Platy
- Mohs scale hardness: 1–2
- Luster: Earthy (dull)
- Streak: White
- Diaphaneity: Translucent
- Refractive index: 1.558–1.567

Aliettite is a complex phyllosilicate mineral of the smectite group with a formula of (Ca_{0.2}Mg_{6}(Si,Al)_{8}O_{20}(OH)_{4}·4H_{2}O) or [Mg_{3}Si_{4}O_{10}(OH)_{2}](Ca_{0.5},Na)_{0.33}(Al,Mg,Fe^{2+})_{2}_{−}_{3}(Si,Al)_{4}O_{10}(OH)_{2}·n(H_{2}O).

It is a soft, colorless to pale yellow or green earthy mineral which crystallizes in the monoclinic system as minute tabular to platy crystals.

It was first described in 1968 for an occurrence in Monte Chiaro, Albareto, Parma Province, Emilia-Romagna, Italy and named for the Italian mineralogist Andrea Alietti (born 1923).

It occurs in serpentinized ophiolites and their residual soil. It also occurs in altered dolomite. Associated minerals include talc, chlorite, serpentine and calcite. In addition to the type locality in Italy it has been reported from Kinshasa, Katanga; the Chelyabinsk Oblast of the southern Urals and the Turii alkaline Massif of the Kola Peninsula in Russia; the Zirabulak Mountains of Uzbekistan; and the Goldstrike Mine of Eureka County, Nevada, US.
