= Aschamalmite =

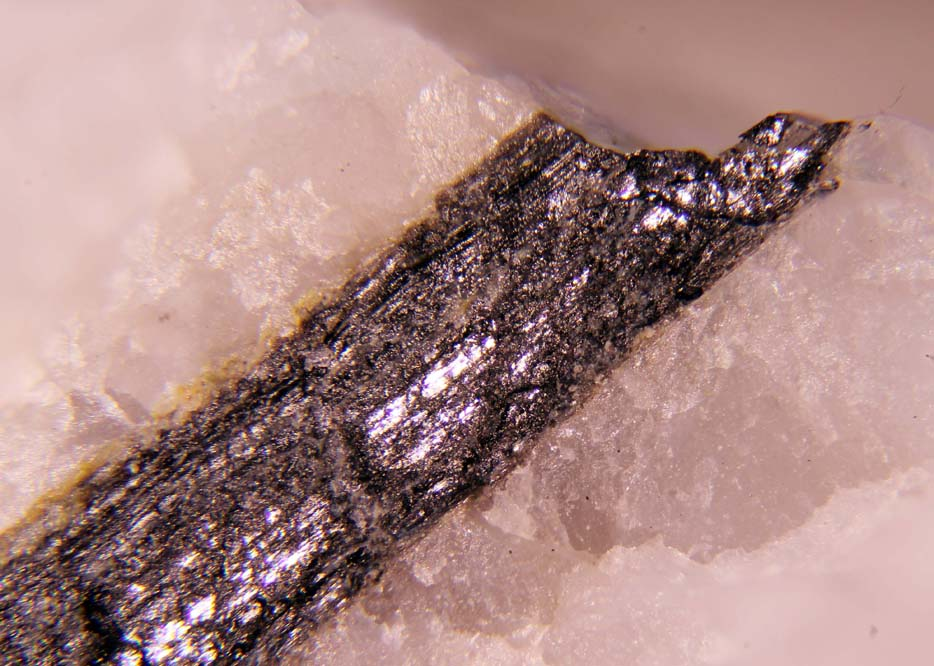
- Rare aschamalmite crystals

General
- Category: Minerals
- Formula: Pb_{6}Bi_{2}S_{9}
- IMA symbol: Ahm

Identification
- Color: Lead-grey
- Luster: Metallic
- Diaphaneity: Opaque
- Specific gravity: 7.33

Aschamalmite is a mineral with the chemical formula Pb_{6}Bi_{2}S_{9}. Its type locality is the High Tauern in Austria.
