= Anzaite-(Ce) =

Rare earth oxide mineral

General
- Category: Oxide mineral
- Formula: Ce_{4}Fe^{2+}Ti_{6}O_{18}(OH)_{2}
- IMA symbol: Anz-Ce
- Crystal system: Monoclinic
- Crystal class: Prismatic (2/m) (same H-M symbol)
- Space group: C2/m
- Unit cell: a = 5.29, b = 14.58 c = 5.23 [Å]; β = 97.23° (approximated); Z = 1

Identification
- Color: Grey
- Crystal habit: Crystals (tiny)
- Cleavage: None
- Tenacity: Brittle
- Mohs scale hardness: 6–6.5
- Diaphaneity: Opaque
- Density: 5.05 (calculated; approximated)

Anzaite-(Ce) is a rare-earth element (REE) oxide mineral with the formula Ce_{4}Fe^{2+}Ti_{6}O_{18}(OH)_{2}. An example of chemically related mineral is lucasite-(Ce), although it contains no iron. Cerium in anzaite-(Ce) is mainly substituted by neodymium, lanthanum, calcium and praseodymium. Titanium is substituted by niobium. Trace elements include thorium. The mineral is monoclinic, space group C2/m. Anzaite-(Ce) is hydrothermal mineral found in a carbonatite from the mineralogically prolific Kola Peninsula. The mineral name honors Anatoly N. Zaitsev, who is known for studies of carbonatites and REE.

== Occurrence and association ==
Parent rocks for anzaite-(Ce) are silicocarbonatites of the Afrikanda alkali-ultramafic massif. These rocks underwent hydrothermal reworking, that beside anzaite-(Ce) produced also calcite, clinochlore, hibschite and titanite in expense of primary minerals.

== Notes on chemistry ==
Cerium in anzaite-(Ce) is substituted by significant amounts of neodymium, lanthanum, calcium, and praseodymium, with minor samarium and thorium. Other impurities in the mineral composition include niobium and silicon.

== Crystal structure ==
The crystal structure of anzaite-(Ce) characterizes in:

- the presence of layers with REE (square antiprismatic coordination) and Fe (octahedral)
- the presence of layers with Ti with coordination numbers 5 and 6
- disorder of Fe, ^{V}Ti and two of four present anion sites

The disordered sites are located on the (010) planes, separated by ordered domains containing REE, ^{VI}Ti (octahedral) and two oxide-anion sites.
