= Alcantarillaite =

Copper sulfide mineral

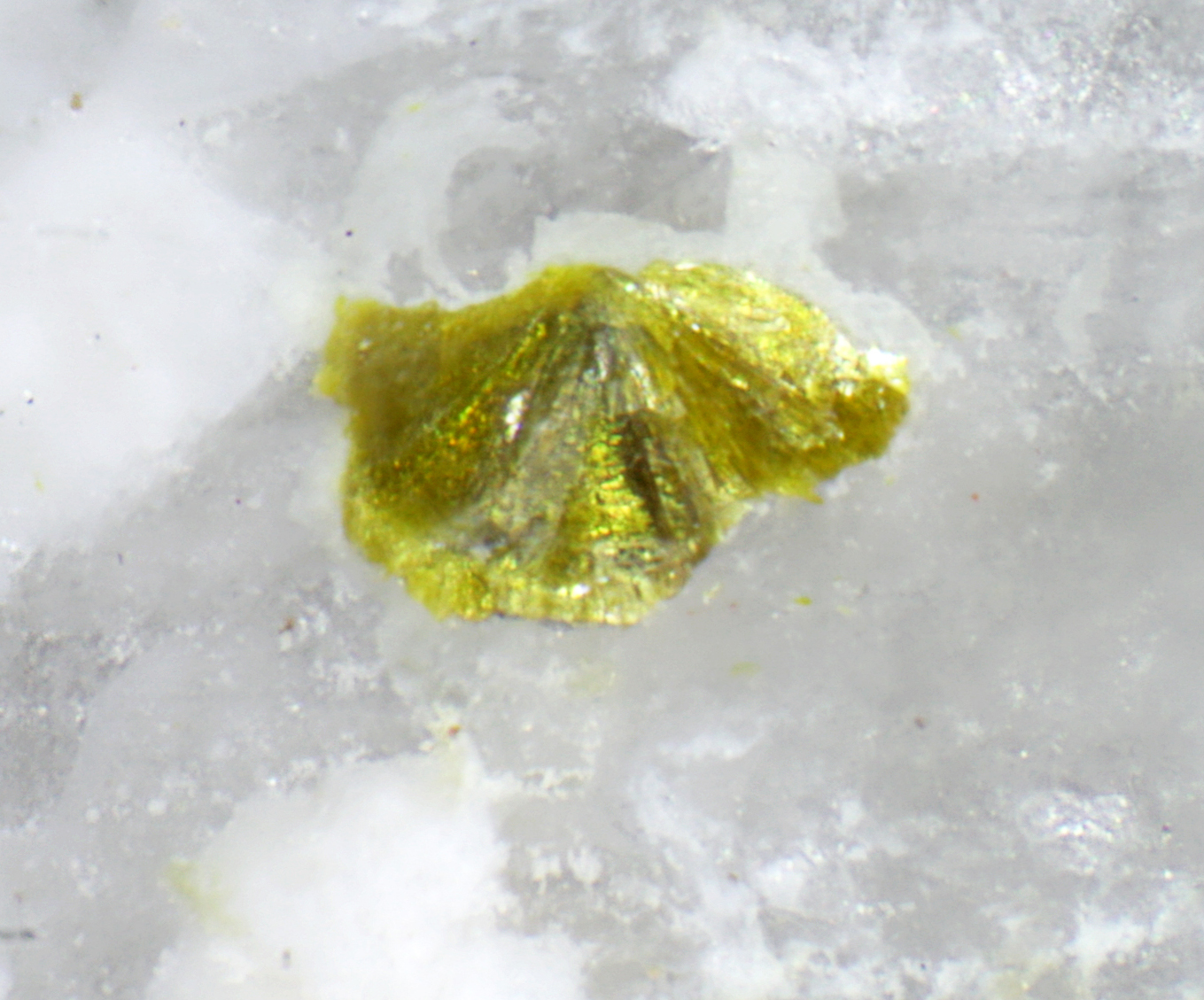
- Alcantarillaite. Section of a spherule showing laminar crystals, on quartz. Alcantarilla Mine, Belalcázar (Córdoba) Spain. Width, 1.5 mm

General
- Category: Arsenate mineral
- Formula: [Fe^{3+}_{0.5}(H_{2}O)_{4}][CaAs^{3+}_{2}(Fe^{3+}_{2.5}W^{6+}_{0.5})(AsO_{4})_{2}O_{7}]
- Crystal system: Orthorhombic crystal system

Identification
- Color: bright yellow
- Crystal habit: Clusters of lamellar microcrystals
- Cleavage: Perfect - {100}
- Fracture: Brittle
- Luster: vitreous
- Streak: Yellow
- Density: 3.06
- Optical properties: Translucent
- Refractive index: n_{α} = 1,703 n_{β} = 1,800(5) n_{γ} = 1,850(5)

Alcantarillaite is a mineral, calcium arsenate, iron and wolfram, which has been described as a species from specimens found in the Alcantarilla mine, Belalcázar, province of Córdoba (Spain). Given the complexity and peculiarities of its chemical composition, it could not initially be identified, although it was provisionally considered as phyllotungstite, making it clear that it was probably a new species. It was later described as a new species, which was accepted by the International Association of Mineralogy. The name of the mineral derives from that of the mine where it was found.

== Properties ==
Although alcantarillaite is structurally related to walentaite, it represents a hitherto unique combination of elements. It is deep canary yellow in colour, and forms tabular or lamellar crystals up to a quarter of a millimetre in size, grouped divergently.

== Deposits ==
Alcantarillaite is a secondary mineral, formed by the alteration of arsenides (probably loellingite) in the presence of tungsten minerals. It was approved as a species by the IMA in 2019 and formally published in 2020 The only known locality so far is the type locality, the Alcantarilla mine (or Nuestra señora de las Alcantarillas), in Belalcázar, province of Córdoba (Spain). It occurs in fissures and cavities of a quartz vein associated with arsenopyrite, parasimplesite, karibibite and occasionally ferberite.
