= Argentobaumhauerite =

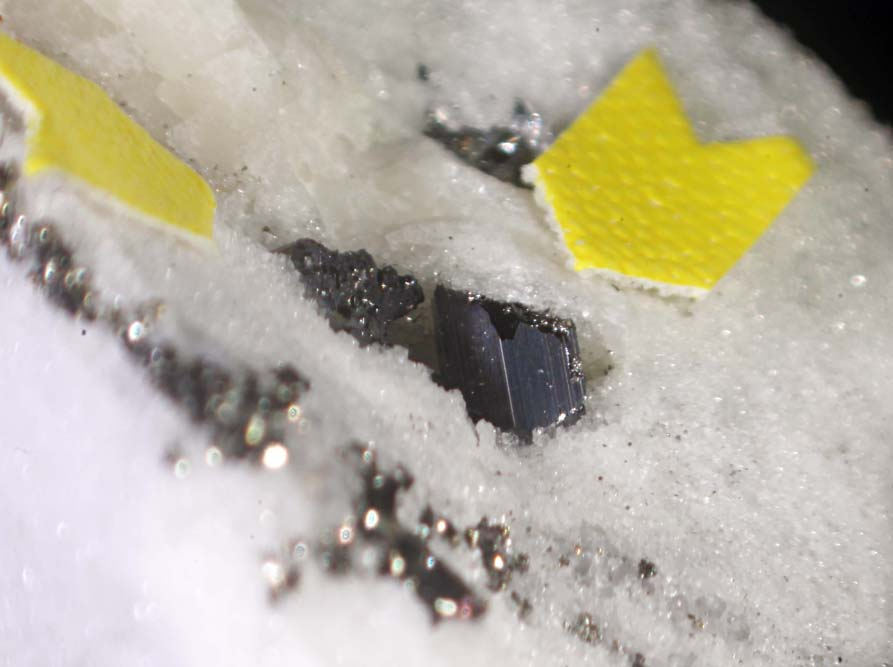
- Rare argentobaumhauerite crystals

General
- Category: Minerals
- Formula: Ag_{1.5}Pb_{22}As_{33.5}S_{72}
- IMA symbol: Abha

Identification
- Color: Steel grey
- Fracture: Conchoidal
- Mohs scale hardness: 3
- Luster: Metallic
- Streak: Reddish brown
- Specific gravity: 5.31

Argentobaumhauerite (IMA symbol: Abha) is a rare mineral with the chemical formula Ag_{1.5}Pb_{22}As_{33.5}S_{72}. Its type locality is the Binn valley in Switzerland.
