= Aubertite =

Sulfate mineral

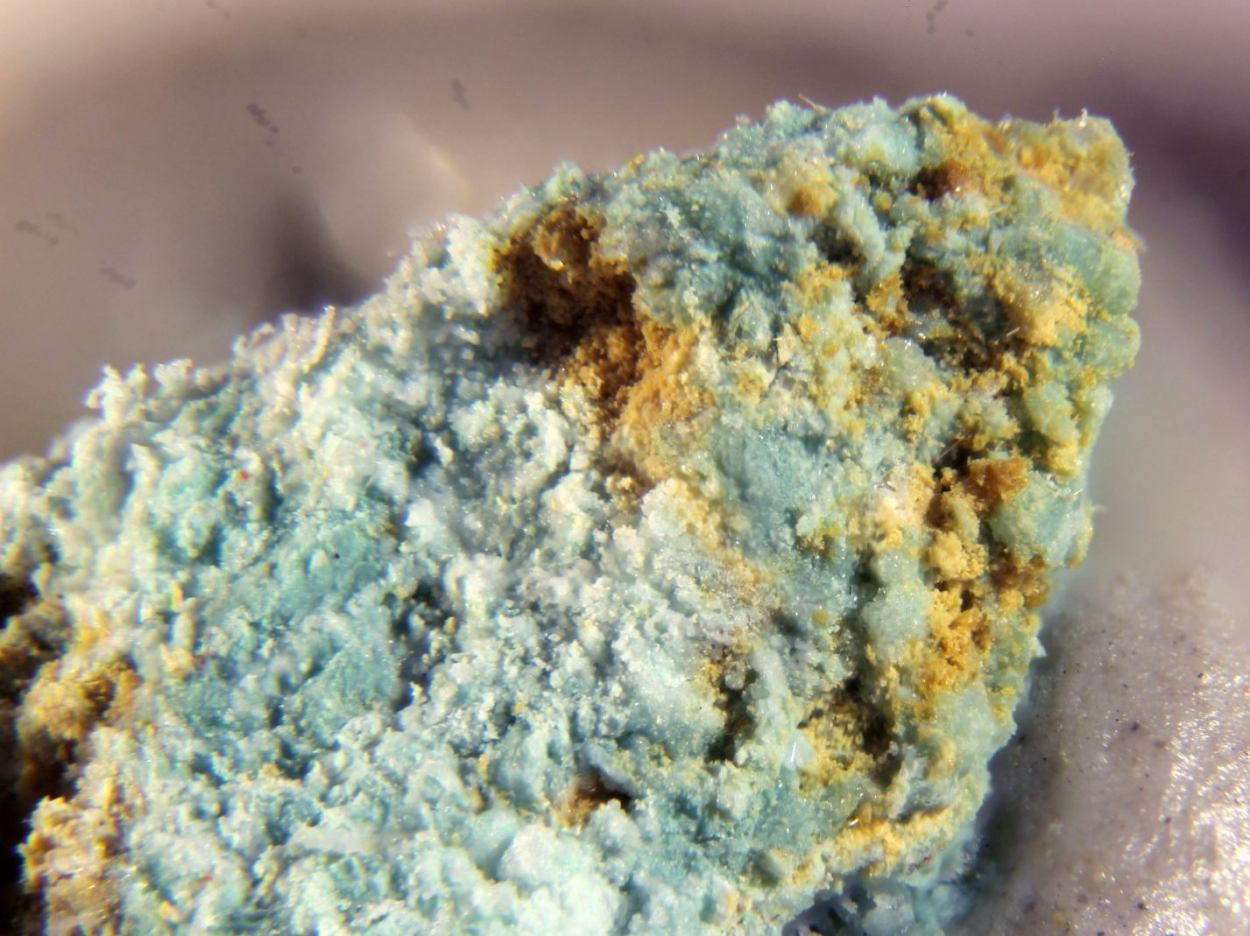
- Aubertite

General
- Category: Minerals
- Formula: CuAl(SO_{4})_{2}Cl·14H_{2}O
- IMA symbol: Aub
- Crystal system: Triclinic

Identification
- Color: Azure-blue
- Cleavage: {010} Perfect
- Mohs scale hardness: 2-3
- Luster: Vitreous
- Streak: light blue
- Specific gravity: 1.815

Aubertite is a mineral with the chemical formula CuAl(SO_{4})_{2}Cl·14H_{2}O. It is colored blue. Its crystals are triclinic pedial. It is transparent. It has vitreous luster. It is not radioactive. Aubertite is rated 2-3 on the Mohs Scale. The sample was collected by J. Aubert (born 1929), assistant director, National Institute of Geophysics, France, in the year 1961. Its type locality is Queténa Mine, Toki Cu deposit, Chuquicamata District, Calama, El Loa Province, Antofagasta Region, Chile.
