= Atheneite =

General
- Category: Arsenide mineral
- Formula: (Pd,Hg)_{3}As
- IMA symbol: Ah
- Strunz classification: 2.AC.05a
- Crystal system: Hexagonal
- Crystal class: Ditrigonal dipyramidal (6̅m2); H-M symbol: (6̅m2)
- Space group: P6̅2m
- Unit cell: a = 6.813, c = 3.4892 [Å]; Z = 3

Identification
- Color: Gray to gray white; white with bluish tint in reflected light
- Crystal habit: Irregular blebs, inclusions
- Luster: Metallic
- Diaphaneity: Opaque
- Specific gravity: 10.2
- Pleochroism: Very weak, in pale yellow to pale bluish gray

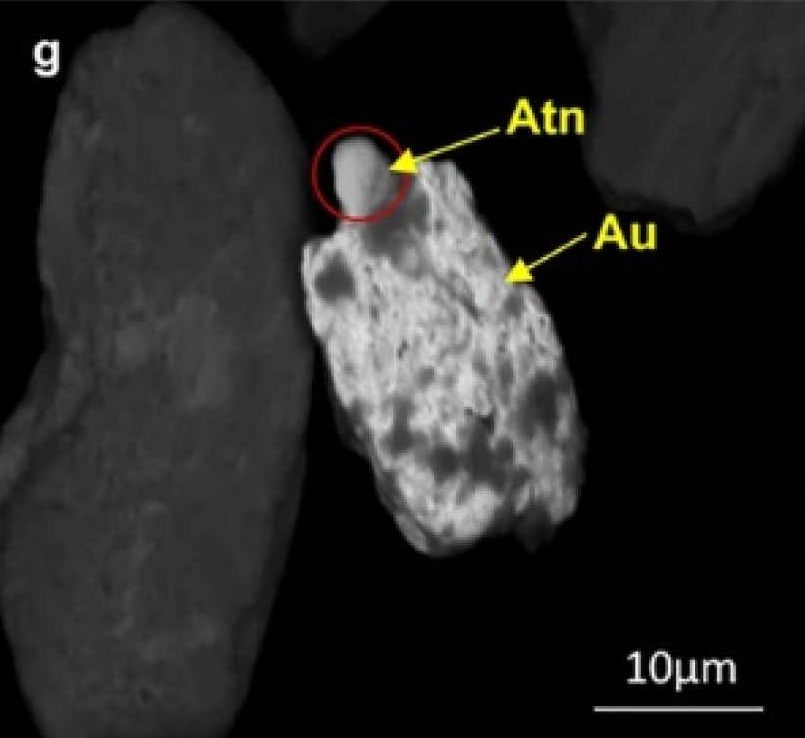

Atheneite is a rare palladium, mercury arsenide mineral with the chemical formula (Pd,Hg)_{3}As associated with palladium–gold deposits. Its composition parallels that of arsenopalladinite (Pd_{8}(As,Sb)_{3}), isomertieite (Pd_{11}Sb_{2}As_{2}) and meritieite-II (Pd_{8}(Sb,As)_{3}) (Cabral, 2002).

== Discovery and occurrence ==
It was discovered in 1974 by A.M. Clark, A.J. Criddle, and E.E. Fejer in the Minas Gerais mine in the town of Itabira, Brazil (Clark, 1974). Atheneite was also found in 1982 during a major gold rush at Serra Pelada in northern Brazil. Since then it has been found in the northern region of Para, Brazil, the northern region of Russia, and the Limpopo province of South Africa (Cabral, 2002; Trabaev, 1995). Its name is derived from the Greek goddess Pallas Athena for its association with palladium-gold deposits. It was first found in concentrates from gold washings in Brazil with intergrowths of arsenopalladinite (Fleischer, 1974). Hematite was also found in intergrowths with atheneite, and is interpreted as being the product of a low temperature, hydrothermal origin.

== Structure ==
Atheneite crystallizes in the hexagonal crystal system with space group P6̅2m and a point grouping of 6̅m2. It has a ditrigonal dipyramidal crystal form. This mineral does not extinguish under crossed polars, showing bright anisotropic colors from purple-brown to dark grey (Fleischer, 1974). These birefringence colors are of the first order. The atomic structure of atheneite is very similar to that of the hexagonal structure carbons that make up graphite.

== Physical properties ==
Atheneite has a metallic luster and its color ranges from white/gray to blue/gray tint. Its Mohs hardness scale is 4.5-5. The Vickers hardness test puts this mineral at a 48. Atheneite also has a specific gravity of 10.2. When placed in a reflected light, it gives off a white light with a yellowish hue and shows very weak reflectance pleochroism in oil (Fleischer, 1974).
