= Adachiite =

Tourmaline mineral

General
- Category: Tourmaline Group
- Formula: CaFe3Al6(Si5AlO18)(BO3)3(OH)3(OH)
- IMA symbol: Adc
- Strunz classification: 9.CK.
- Crystal system: Trigonal
- Crystal class: 3m - Ditrigonal Pyramidal
- Unit cell: 1578.39 Å³

Identification
- Color: Brownish–purple to bluish–purple
- Specific gravity: 3.228
- Density: 3.228 g/cm3
- Birefringence: δ = 0.030
- Pleochroism: Strong

Adachiite (CaFe_{3}Al_{6}(Si_{5}AlO_{18})(BO_{3})_{3}(OH)_{3}(OH)) is a brownish–purple to bluish–purple mineral, discovered in 2013 and described in 2014.

It is named for Tomio Adachi, an amateur geologist and retired teacher who performed many investigations in and around the Kiura Mine and inspiration to many local children who would go on to become professional mineralogists.

Its type locality is the Kiura Mine in Ōita Prefecture, Japan.
