= Aluminoceladonite =

Mica mineral in the celadonite subgroup

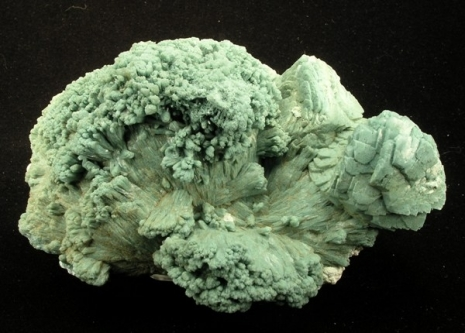
- Heulandite with aluminoceladonite inclusions from Nashik District, Maharashtra, India (Dimensions: 14.8 cm x 10.2 cm x 6.5 cm)

General
- Category: Phyllosilicate minerals
- Group: Mica group, dioctahedral mica group, celadonite subgroup
- Formula: K(Mg,Fe^{2+})Al(Si_{4}O_{10})(OH)_{2}
- IMA symbol: Acel
- Strunz classification: 9.EC.15
- Dana classification: 71.02.02a.06d
- Crystal system: Monoclinic
- Crystal class: 2/m

Identification
- Color: Colorless when pure, green when ferrous iron-bearing
- Fracture: Micaceous
- Optical properties: Biaxial (-)
- Birefringence: 0.0190-0.0240

Aluminoceladonite is a low-temperature potassium dioctahedral mica mineral which is an end-member in the illite-aluminoceladonite solid solution series. The chemical formula for aluminoceladonite is K(Mg,Fe^{2+})Al(Si_{4}O_{10})(OH)_{2}.

== Occurrence ==
Aluminoceladonite is often referred to as a rare mineral, though its actual abundance may be underestimated due to difficulty of identification. Aluminoceladonite, along with other phyllosilicate minerals in the illite-aluminoceladonite solid solution series, has been observed mainly among finely dispersed, mostly inter-layer-deficient, aluminium-rich potassium-dioctahedral mica varieties occurring in sedimentary rocks.
