= Acmonidesite =

General
- Category: Minerals
- Formula: (NH4,K,Pb,Na)9Fe2+4(SO4)5Cl8
- IMA symbol: Acm
- Strunz classification: 7.BC.

Identification
- Color: Brown
- Twinning: None
- Cleavage: None
- Fracture: None
- Luster: Vitreous
- Streak: Light brown
- Specific gravity: 2.56
- Density: 2.551 g/cm3
- 2V angle: 51.6°
- Dispersion: None observed

Acmonidesite (NH_{4},K,Pb,Na)_{9}Fe^{2+}_{4}(SO_{4})_{5}Cl_{8}) is a microscopic brown mineral, discovered in 2013 and described in 2019.

Its name comes from the mythical Greek cyclops Acmonides, said to be one of the three helpers of the god Hephaestus, the god of fire and forging, with his forge said to be located at Vulcano, also the type locality of the mineral.
