= Alsakharovite-Zn =

General
- Category: Minerals
- Formula: NaSrKZn(Ti,Nb)_{4}(Si_{4}O_{12})_{2}(O,OH)_{4}·7H_{2}O
- IMA symbol: Ask-Zn

Identification
- Color: White, light brown, colourless
- Cleavage: None Observed
- Fracture: Irregular/Uneven
- Mohs scale hardness: 5
- Luster: Vitreous
- Streak: White
- Diaphaneity: Transparent, Translucent
- Specific gravity: 2.9

Alsakharovite-Zn (IMA symbol: Ask-Zn) is an extremely rare alkaline strontium zinc titanium silicate mineral from the cyclosilicates class, with the chemical formula NaSrKZn(Ti,Nb)_{4}(Si_{4}O_{12})_{2}(O,OH)_{4}·7H_{2}O, from alkaline pegmatites. It belongs to the labuntsovite group.

The mineral crystallizes in the monoclinic system with space group Cm.
