= Adranosite =

Mineral

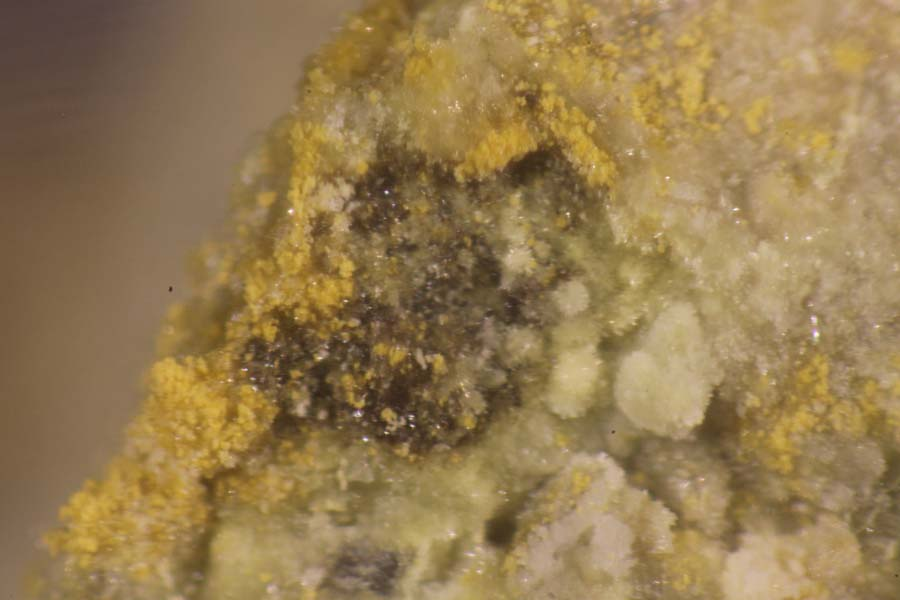
- Dark brown crystals of therasiaite from the La Fossa Crater on adranosite crystals

General
- Category: Ammonium-sodium sulfates
- Formula: (NH_{4})_{4}NaAl_{2}(SO_{4})_{4}Cl(OH)_{2}
- IMA symbol: Arn
- IMA status: Approved
- Strunz classification: 7.BC.
- Crystal system: Tetragonal
- Crystal class: Ditetragonal Dipyramidal

Identification
- Color: Colorless, white
- Cleavage: None observed
- Luster: Vitreous
- Streak: White
- Specific gravity: 2.15
- Density: 2.15(1) g/cm^{3} (Measured); 2.176 g/cm^{3} (Calculated)
- Birefringence: 0.010 Maximum

Adranosite is a mineral discovered in the La Fossa crater, Vulcano, Aeolian Islands, Italy, with the formula (NH_{4})_{4}NaAl_{2}(SO_{4})_{4}Cl(OH)_{2}. Adranosite-(Fe) is the Fe3+ analogue of adranosite, with the formula (NH_{4})_{4}NaFe_{2}(SO_{4})_{4}Cl(OH)_{2}.

Adreanosite is named for Adranos, an ancient fire god worshipped in Sicily.
