= Antipinite =

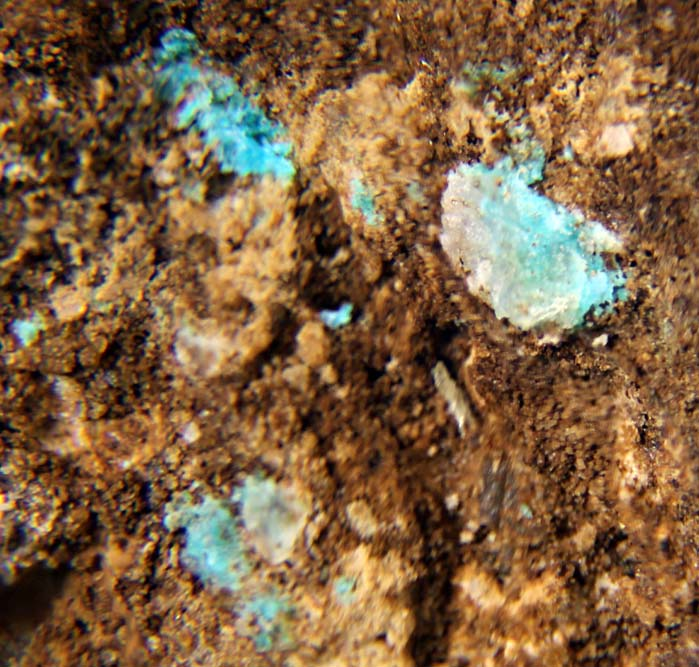
- Rare antipinite crystals

General
- Category: Oxalate minerals
- Formula: KNa_{3}Cu_{2}(C_{2}O_{4})_{4}
- IMA symbol: Atp
- Strunz classification: 10.00.

Identification
- Color: Blue
- Specific gravity: 2.53

Antipinite (IMA symbol: Atp) is a rare alkali Copper oxalate mineral with the chemical formula KNa_{3}Cu_{2}(C_{2}O_{4})_{4}. Its type locality is the Tarapacá Region in Chile.
