= Achyrophanite =

Mineral

General
- Category: Minerals
- Formula: (K,Na)_{3}(Fe^{3+},Ti,Al,Mg)_{5}O_{2}(AsO_{4})_{5}
- IMA symbol: Aph
- Strunz classification: 8.BF.30
- Crystal system: Orthorhombic

Identification
- Color: Straw-yellow to golden yellow
- Cleavage: Perfect (001)
- Fracture: Irregular/Uneven
- Tenacity: Brittle
- Luster: Vitreous
- Streak: White
- Specific gravity: 3.814
- Density: 3.814 g/cm3
- References: https://www.mindat.org/min-52919.html

Achyrophanite ((K,Na)_{3}(Fe^{3+},Ti,Al,Mg)_{5}O_{2}(AsO_{4})_{5}) is a yellow mineral, discovered in 2018 and described in 2025.

Its name comes from the Greek words άχυρον (straw) and φαίνομαι (to appear), hinting at its straw like appearance.

Its type locality is the Tolbachik Volcano in Kamchatka, Russia.
