= Almarudite =

General
- Category: Minerals
- Formula: K([ ],Na)_{2}(Mn^{2+},Fe^{2+},Mg)_{2}(Be,Al)_{3}[Si_{12}O_{30}]
- IMA symbol: Alr

Identification
- Color: Yellow to orange
- Cleavage: None Observed
- Fracture: Irregular/Uneven
- Mohs scale hardness: 6
- Luster: Vitreous
- Streak: Pale orange
- Diaphaneity: Transparent, Translucent
- Specific gravity: 2.714

Almarudite (IMA symbol: Alr) is an extremely rare alkaline manganese beryllium silicate mineral of the cyclosilicates (ring silicates) class, with the chemical formula K([ ],Na)_{2}(Mn^{2+},Fe^{2+},Mg)_{2}(Be,Al)_{3}[Si_{12}O_{30}], from the volcanic environment of the Eifel Mountains in Germany.
