= Altisite =

General
- Category: Minerals
- Formula: Na_{3}K_{6}Ti_{2}Al_{2}Si_{8}O_{26}Cl_{3}
- IMA symbol: Ati

Identification
- Color: Colourless
- Cleavage: None Observed
- Fracture: Conchoidal
- Mohs scale hardness: 6
- Luster: Vitreous
- Streak: White
- Specific gravity: 2.64

Altisite (IMA symbol: Ati) is an exceedingly rare alkaline titanium aluminosilicate chloride mineral with formula Na_{3}K_{6}Ti_{2}Al_{2}Si_{8}O_{26}Cl_{3}, from alkaline pegmatites. It is named after its composition (ALuminium, TItanium, and SIlicon).

The mineral crystallizes in the monoclinic crystal system with space group C2/m.
