= Alpeite =

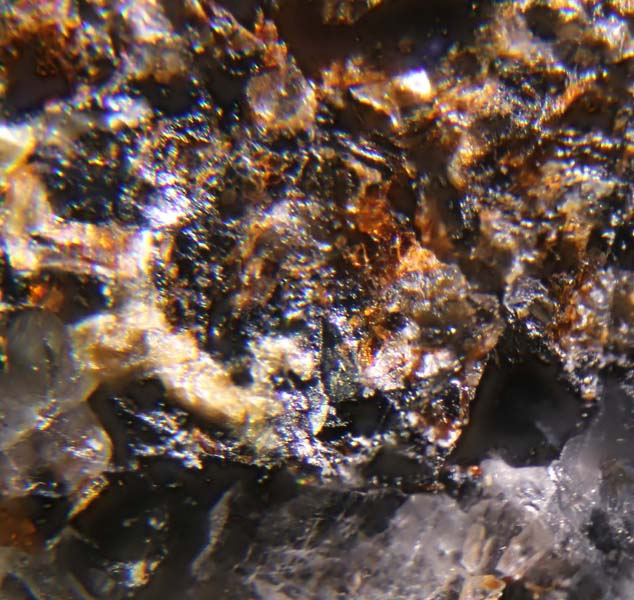
- Alpeite crystals

General
- Category: Minerals
- Formula: Ca_{4}Mn^{3+}_{2}Al_{2}(Mn^{3+}Mg)(SiO_{4})_{2}(Si_{3}O_{10})(V^{5+}O_{4})(OH)_{6}
- IMA symbol: Apt

Identification
- Color: Brownish red
- Tenacity: Brittle
- Mohs scale hardness: 5.5-6
- Luster: Vitreous, Silky
- Streak: Beige
- Diaphaneity: Transparent
- Specific gravity: 3.374

Alpeite (IMA symbol: Apt) is a calcium manganese magnesium silicate mineral with the chemical formula Ca_{4}Mn^{3+}_{2}Al_{2}(Mn^{3+}Mg)(SiO_{4})_{2}(Si_{3}O_{10})(V^{5+}O_{4})(OH)_{6}. It is named for its type locality, the Monte Alpe mine in Italy.
