= Afmite =

Phosphate mineral

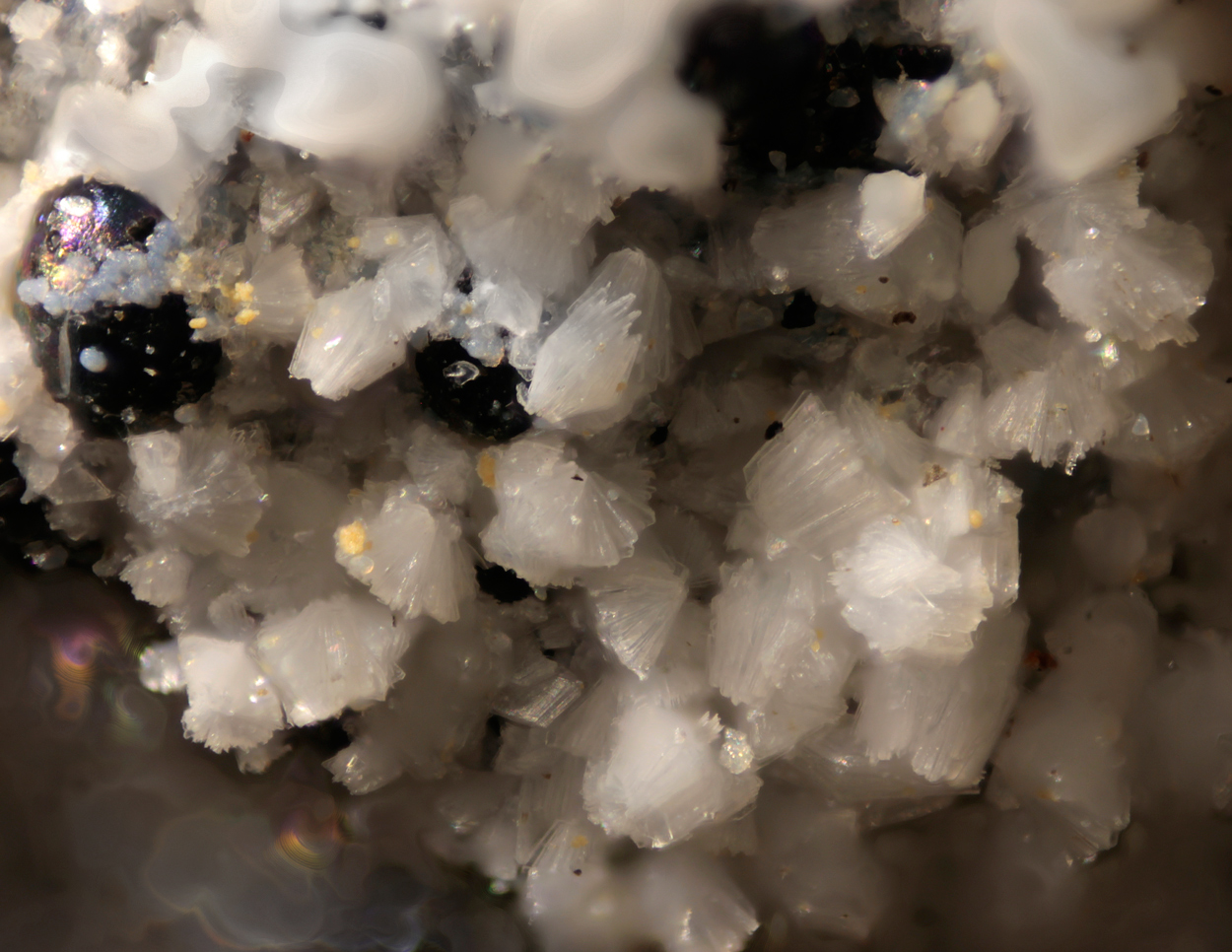
- Afmite crystals found in France

General
- Category: Minerals
- Formula: Al_{3}(OH)_{4}(PO_{4})(PO_{3}OH)·H_{2}O
- IMA symbol: Afm

Afmite is phosphate mineral with the chemical formula Al_{3}(OH)_{4}(PO_{4})(PO_{3}OH)·H_{2}O. It is named for the French mineralogy group Association Française de Microminéralogie, or AFM for short.
