= Aurorite =

Mineral of manganese and silver

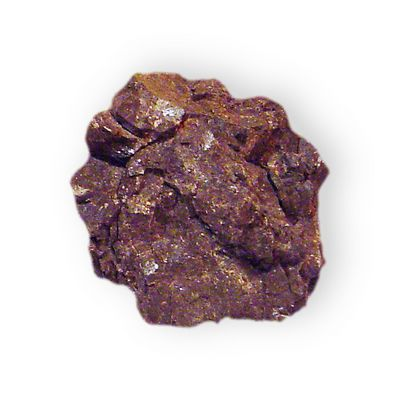
- Aurorite crystals found in calcite

General
- Category: Minerals
- Formula: (Mn^{2+},Ag,Ca)Mn^{4+}_{3}O_{7}·3H_{2}O
- IMA symbol: Aro

Identification
- Color: Black, pale brown in transmitted light at the edges of very thin, platy grains
- Luster: Metallic
- Specific gravity: 3.81

Aurorite is a dark-colored mineral with the chemical formula (Mn^{2+},Ag,Ca)Mn^{4+}_{3}O_{7}·3H_{2}O. It is named for its type locality, the North Aurora mine in White Pine County, Nevada.
