= Arsenate mineral =

Naturally occurring orthoarsenates

Arsenate minerals usually refer to the naturally occurring orthoarsenates, possessing the (AsO_{4})^{3−} anion group and, more rarely, other arsenates with anions like AsO_{3}(OH)^{2−} (also written HAsO_{4}^{2−}) (example: pharmacolite Ca(AsO_{3}OH)^{.}2H_{2}O) or (very rarely) [AsO_{2}(OH)_{2}]^{−} (example: andyrobertsite). Arsenite minerals are much less common. Both the Dana and the Strunz mineral classifications place the arsenates in with the phosphate minerals.

Example arsenate minerals include:

- Annabergite Ni_{3}(AsO_{4})_{2}·8H_{2}O
- Austinite CaZn(AsO_{4})(OH)
- Clinoclase Cu_{3}(AsO_{4})(OH)_{3}
- Conichalcite CaCu(AsO_{4})(OH)
- Cornubite Cu_{5}(AsO_{4})_{2}(OH)_{4}
- Cornwallite Cu^{2+}_{5}(AsO_{4})_{2}(OH)_{2}
- Erythrite Co_{3}(AsO_{4})_{2}·8H_{2}O
- Mimetite Pb_{5}(AsO_{4})_{3}Cl
- Olivenite Cu_{2}(AsO_{4})OH

== Nickel–Strunz Classification -08- Phosphates ==
IMA-CNMNC proposes a new hierarchical scheme (Mills et al., 2009). This list uses it to modify the Classification of Nickel–Strunz (mindat.org, 10 ed, pending publication).

- Abbreviations:
  - "*" - discredited (IMA/CNMNC status).
  - "?" - questionable/doubtful (IMA/CNMNC status).
  - "REE" - Rare-earth element (Sc, Y, La, Ce, Pr, Nd, Pm, Sm, Eu, Gd, Tb, Dy, Ho, Er, Tm, Yb, Lu)
  - "PGE" - Platinum-group element (Ru, Rh, Pd, Os, Ir, Pt)
  - 03.C Aluminofluorides, 06 Borates, 08 Vanadates (04.H V^{[5,6]} Vanadates), 09 Silicates:
    - Neso: insular (from Greek νησος nēsos, island)
    - Soro: grouping (from Greek σωροῦ sōros, heap, mound (especially of corn))
    - Cyclo: ring
    - Ino: chain (from Greek ις [genitive: ινος inos], fibre)
    - Phyllo: sheet (from Greek φύλλον phyllon, leaf)
    - Tekto: three-dimensional framework
- Nickel–Strunz code scheme: NN.XY.##x
  - NN: Nickel–Strunz mineral class number
  - X: Nickel–Strunz mineral division letter
  - Y: Nickel–Strunz mineral family letter
  - ##x: Nickel–Strunz mineral/group number, x add-on letter

=== Class: arsenates and vanadates ===
- 08.A Arsenates and vanadates without additional anions, without H_{2}O
  - 08.AA With small cations (some also with larger ones): 05 Alarsite
  - 08.AB With medium-sized cations: 25 Xanthiosite, 30 Lammerite, 35 Mcbirneyite, 35 Stranskiite, 35 Pseudolyonsite, 40 Lyonsite
  - 08.AC With medium-sized and large cations: 05 Howardevansite; 10 Arseniopleite, 10 Caryinite, 10 Johillerite, 10 Nickenichite, 10 Bradaczekite, 10 Yazganite, 10 Odanielite; 25 Berzeliite, 25 Manganberzeliite, 25 Palenzonaite, 25 Schäferite; 75 Ronneburgite, 80 Tillmannsite, 85 Filatovite
  - 08.AD With only large cations: 10 Weilite, 10 Svenekite; 30 Schultenite, 35 Chernovite-(Y), 35 Dreyerite, 35 Wakefieldite-(La), 35 Wakefieldite-(Nd), 35 Wakefieldite-(Ce), 35 Wakefieldite-(Y); 40 Pucherite, 50 Gasparite-(Ce), 50 Rooseveltite; 55 Tetrarooseveltite, 60 Chursinite, 65 Clinobisvanite
- 08.B Arsenates and vanadates with additional anions, without H_{2}O
  - 08.BA With small and medium-sized cations: 10 Bergslagite
  - 08.BB With only medium-sized cations, (OH, etc.):RO_{4} £1:1: 15 Sarkinite; 30 Zincolivenite, 30 Eveite, 30 Olivenite, 30 Adamite, 30 Auriacusite; 35 Paradamite, 40 Wilhelmkleinite, 50 Namibite, 60 Urusovite, 65 Theoparacelsite, 70 Turanite, 75 Stoiberite, 80 Fingerite, 85 Averievite
  - 08.BC With only medium-sized cations, (OH, etc.):RO_{4} > 1:1 and < 2:1: 05 Angelellite, 15 Aerugite
  - 08.BD With only medium-sized cations, (OH, etc.):RO_{4} = 2:1: 05 Cornwallite, 10 Arsenoclasite, 15 Parwelite, 20 Reppiaite, 30 Cornubite
  - 08.BE With only medium-sized cations, (OH, etc.):RO_{4} > 2:1: 20 Clinoclase, 25 Gilmarite, 25 Arhbarite, 30 Allactite, 30 Flinkite, 35 Chlorophoenicite, 35 Magnesiochlorophoenicite, 40 Gerdtremmelite, 45 Arakiite, 45 Kraisslite, 45 Dixenite, 45 Hematolite, 45 Mcgovernite, 45 Turtmannite, 45 Carlfrancisite, 50 Synadelphite, 55 Holdenite, 60 Kolicite, 65 Sabelliite, 70 Jarosewichite, 75 Theisite, 80 Coparsite
  - 08.BF With medium-sized and large cations, (OH, etc.):RO_{4} < 0.5:1: 20 Nabiasite
  - 08.BG With medium-sized and large cations, (OH, etc.):RO_{4} = 0.5:1: 05 Arsenbrackebuschite, 05 Brackebuschite, 05 Gamagarite, 05 Arsentsumebite, 05 Feinglosite, 05 Bushmakinite, 05 Tokyoite, 05 Calderonite
  - 08.BH With medium-sized and large cations, (OH, etc.):RO_{4} = 1:1: 10 Durangite, 10 Maxwellite, 10 Tilasite; 30 Carminite, 30 Sewardite; 35 Austinite, 35 Adelite, 35 Duftite, 35 Arsendescloizite, 35 Conichalcite, 35 Gabrielsonite, 35 Nickelaustinite, 35 Cobaltaustinite, 35 Tangeite, 35 Gottlobite; 40 Descloizite, 40 Cechite, 40 Pyrobelonite, 40 Mottramite; 45 Bayldonite, 45 Vesignieite; 50 Paganoite, 65 Leningradite
  - 08.BK With medium-sized and large cations, (OH, etc.): 10 Medenbachite, 10 Cobaltneustadtelite, 10 Neustadtelite, 20 Heyite, 25 Jamesite
  - 08.BL With medium-sized and large cations, (OH, etc.):RO_{4} = 3:1: 05 Beudantite, 05 Hidalgoite, 05 Gallobeudantite, 05 Kemmlitzite, 10 Segnitite, 10 Arsenogorceixite, 10 Arsenocrandallite, 10 Arsenogoyazite, 10 Dussertite, 10 Philipsbornite, 13 Arsenowaylandite, 13 Arsenoflorencite-(Ce), 13 Arsenoflorencite-(La), 13 Arsenoflorencite-(Nd), 13 Graulichite-(Ce)
  - 08.BM With medium-sized and large cations, (OH, etc.):RO_{4} = 4:1: 05 Retzian-(Ce), 05 Retzian-(La), 05 Retzian-(Nd), 10 Kolitschite
  - 08.BN With only large cations, (OH, etc.):RO_{4} = 0.33:1: 05 Fermorite, 05 Johnbaumite-M, 05 Johnbaumite, 05 Clinomimetite, 05 Hedyphane, 05 Mimetite-M, 05 Mimetite, 05 Morelandite, 05 Svabite, 05 Turneaureite, 05 Vanadinite
  - 08.BO With only large cations, (OH, etc.):RO_{4} 1:1: 10 Preisingerite, 10 Schumacherite, 15 Atelestite, 15 Hechtsbergite, 20 Kombatite, 20 Sahlinite, 35 Kuznetsovite, 45 Schlegelite
- 08.C Arsenates and vanadates without additional anions, with H_{2}O
  - 08.CA With small and large/medium cations: 30 Arsenohopeite, 35 Warikahnite, 50 Keyite, 55 Pushcharovskite, 60 Prosperite
  - 08.CB With only medium-sized cations, RO_{4}:H_{2}O = 1:1: 10 Nyholmite, 10 Miguelromeroite, 10 Sainfeldite, 10 Villyaellenite; 15 Krautite, 15 Fluckite; 20 Cobaltkoritnigite, 20 Koritnigite; 25 Yvonite, 30 Geminite, 35 Schubnelite, 40 Radovanite, 45 Kazakhstanite, 50 Kolovratite, 55 Irhtemite, 60 Burgessite
  - 08.CC With only medium-sized cations, RO_{4}:H_{2}O = 1:1.5: 10 Kaatialaite, 15 Leogangite
  - 08.CD With only medium-sized cations, RO_{4}:H_{2}O = 1:2: 10 Mansfieldite, 10 Scorodite, 10 Yanomamite; 15 Parascorodite, 25 Sterlinghillite, 30 Rollandite
  - 08.CE With only medium-sized cations, RO_{4}:H_{2}O £1:2.5: 05 Geigerite, 05 Chudobaite, 15 Brassite, 20 Rosslerite, 30 Veselovskyite, 30 Ondrušite, 30 Lindackerite, 30 Pradetite; 40 Ferrisymplesite, 40 Manganohörnesite, 40 Annabergite, 40 Erythrite, 40 Hörnesite, 40 Köttigite, 40 Parasymplesite, 45 Symplesite, 60 Kaňkite, 65 Steigerite, 70 Metaschoderite, 70 Schoderite, 85 Metaköttigite
  - 08.CF With large and medium-sized cations, RO_{4}:H_{2}O > 1:1: 05 Grischunite
  - 08.CG With large and medium-sized cations, RO_{4}:H_{2}O = 1:1: 05 Gaitite, 05 Parabrandtite, 05 Talmessite, 10 Roselite, 10 Rruffite, 10 Brandtite, 10 Zincroselite, 10 Wendwilsonite, 15 Ferrilotharmeyerite, 15 Cabalzarite, 15 Lotharmeyerite, 15 Cobaltlotharmeyerite, 15 Mawbyite, 15 Cobalttsumcorite, 15 Nickellotharmeyerite, 15 Schneebergite, 15 Nickelschneebergite, 15 Tsumcorite, 15 Thometzekite, 15 Manganlotharmeyerite, 15 Mounanaite, 15 Krettnichite; 20 Zincgartrellite, 20 Lukrahnite, 20 Gartrellite, 20 Helmutwinklerite, 20 Rappoldite, 20 Phosphogartrellite; 25 Pottsite, 35 Nickeltalmessite
  - 08.CH With large and medium-sized cations, RO_{4}:H_{2}O < 1:1: 05 Walentaite, 15 Picropharmacolite; 55 Smolianinovite, 55 Fahleite; 60 Barahonaite-(Fe), 60 Barahonaite-(Al)
  - 08.CJ With only large cations: 20 Haidingerite, 25 Vladimirite, 30 Ferrarisite, 35 Machatschkiite; 40 Phaunouxite, 40 Rauenthalite; 50 Pharmacolite, 55 Mcnearite, 65 Sincosite, 65 Bariosincosite, 75 Guerinite
- 08.D arsenates and vanadates
  - 08.DA With small (and occasionally larger) cations: 05 Bearsite, 35 Philipsburgite, 50 Ianbruceite
  - 08.DB With only medium-sized cations, (OH, etc.):RO_{4} < 1:1: 05 Pitticite, 35 Sarmientite, 40 Bukovskyite, 45 Zykaite, 75 Braithwaiteite
  - 08.DC With only medium-sized cations, (OH, etc.):RO_{4} = 1:1 and < 2:1: 07 Euchroite, 10 Legrandite, 12 Strashimirite; 15 Arthurite, 15 Ojuelaite, 15 Cobaltarthurite, 15 Bendadaite; 20 Coralloite, 30 Maghrebite, 32 Tinticite, 55 Mapimite, 57 Ogdensburgite
  - 08.DD With only medium-sized cations, (OH, etc.):RO_{4} = 2:1: 05 Chenevixite, 05 Luetheite; 10 Akrochordite, 10 Guanacoite
  - 08.DE With only medium-sized cations, (OH, etc.):RO_{4} = 3:1: 15 Bulachite, 25 Ceruleite, 40 Juanitaite
  - 08.DF With only medium-sized cations, (OH, etc.):RO_{4} > 3:1: 10 Liskeardite, 15 Rusakovite, 20 Liroconite, 30 Chalcophyllite, 35 Parnauite
  - 08.DG With large and medium-sized cations, (OH, etc.):RO_{4} < 0.5:1: 05 Shubnikovite, 05 Lavendulan, 05 Lemanskiite, 05 Zdenekite
  - 08.DH With large and medium-sized cations, (OH, etc.):RO_{4} < 1:1: 30 Arseniosiderite, 30 Kolfanite, 30 Sailaufite; 45 Mahnertite; 50 Andyrobertsite, 50 Calcioandyrobertsite; 60 Bouazzerite
  - 08.DJ With large and medium-sized cations, (OH, etc.):RO_{4} = 1:l: 15 Camgasite, 45 Attikaite
  - 08.DK With large and medium-sized cations, (OH, etc.):RO_{4} > 1:1 and < 2:1: Richelsdorfite, 10 Bariopharmacosiderite, 10 Pharmacosiderite, 10 Natropharmacosiderite, 10 Hydroniumpharmacosiderite; 12 Pharmacoalumite, 12 Natropharmacoalumite, 12 Bariopharmacoalumite
  - 08.DL With large and medium-sized cations, (OH, etc.):RO_{4} = 2:1: 15 Agardite-(Ce), 15 Agardite-(La), 15 Agardite-(Nd), 15 Agardite-(Y), 15 Goudeyite, 15 Zalesiite, 15 Mixite, 15 Plumboagardite; 20 Cheremnykhite, 20 Dugganite, 20 Wallkilldellite-(Fe), 20 Wallkilldellite-(Mn)
  - 08.DM With large and medium-sized cations, (OH, etc.):RO_{4} > 2:1: 05 Esperanzaite, 10 Clinotyrolite, 10 Tyrolite, 15 Betpakdalite-CaCa, 15 Betpakdalite-NaCa, 20 Phosphovanadylite-Ba, 20 Phosphovanadylite-Ca, 25 Yukonite, 40 Santafeite
- 08.E Uranyl arsenates
  - 08.EA UO_{2}:RO_{4} = 1:2: 05 Orthowalpurgite, 05 Walpurgite; 10 Hallimondite
  - 08.EB UO_{2}:RO_{4} = 1:1: 05 Metarauchite, 05 Heinrichite, 05 Kahlerite, 05 Novacekite, 05 Uranospinite, 05 Zeunerite; 10 Metazeunerite, 10 Metauranospinite, 10 Metaheinrichite, 10 Metakahlerite, 10 Metakirchheimerite, 10 Metalodevite, 10 Metanovacekite; 15 Uramarsite, 15 Trogerite, 15 Abernathyite, 15 Natrouranospinite; 20 Chistyakovaite, 25 Arsenuranospathite
  - 08.EC UO_{2}:RO_{4} = 3:2: 10 Arsenuranylite, 15 Hugelite, 20 Arsenovanmeersscheite, 45 Nielsbohrite
  - 08.ED Unclassified: 10 Asselbornite
- 08.F Polyarsenates and [4]-polyvanadates
  - 08.FA Polyarsenates and [4]-polyvanadates, without OH and H_{2}O; dimers of corner-sharing RO_{4} tetrahedra: 05 Blossite, 10 Ziesite, 15 Chervetite, 25 Petewilliamsite
  - 08.FC [4]-Polyvanadates, with H_{2}O only: 05 Fianelite, 15 Pintadoite
  - 08.FD [4]-Polyvanadates, with OH and H_{2}O: 05 Martyite, 05 Volborthite
  - 08.FE Ino-[4]-vanadates: 05 Ankinovichite, 05 Alvanite
- 08.X Unclassified Strunz arsenates and vanadates
