= Brassite =

Rare arsenate mineral

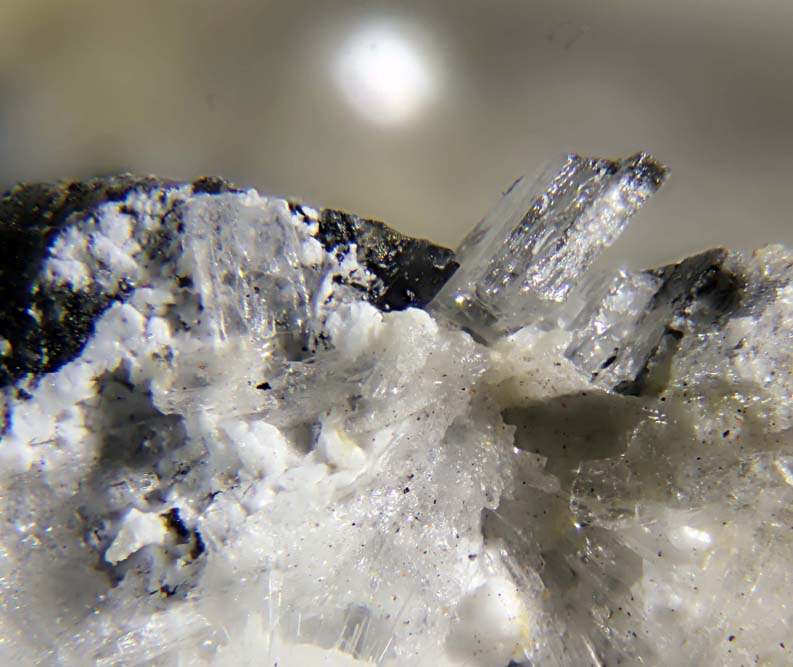
- Brassite (white) accompanied by rösslerite

General
- Category: Arsenate mineral
- Formula: Mg(AsO_{3}OH)·4(H_{2}O)
- IMA symbol: Bsi
- Strunz classification: 8.CE.15
- Dana classification: 39.01.07.01
- Crystal system: Orthorhombic
- Crystal class: Dipyramidal (mmm); H-M symbol: (2/m 2/m 2/m)
- Space group: Pbca
- Unit cell: a = 7.472 Å, b = 10.891 Å, c = 16.585 Å; Z = 8

Identification
- Color: White
- Crystal habit: Cryptocrystalline crusts
- Cleavage: {001} Perfect
- Fracture: Irregular/uneven, splintery
- Tenacity: Brittle
- Luster: Silky, dull, earthy
- Streak: White
- Diaphaneity: Translucent
- Specific gravity: 2.28
- Optical properties: Biaxial (+)
- Refractive index: n_{α} = 1.531 n_{β} = 1.546 n_{γ} = 1.562
- Birefringence: 0.031
- Pleochroism: Non-pleochroic
- 2V angle: 80°
- Dispersion: r < v moderate
- Solubility: +++ HCl, + H_{2}O

Brassite is a rare arsenate mineral with the chemical formula Mg(AsO_{3}OH)·4(H_{2}O). It was named brassite, in 1973, to honor French chemist Réjane Brasse, who first synthesized the compound. The type locality for brassite is Jáchymov of the Czech Republic.

It occurs as an alteration of magnesium carbonate minerals by arsenic bearing solutions. It occurs associated with pharmacolite, picropharmacolite, weilite, haidingerite, rauenthalite, native arsenic, realgar and dolomite.

== Localities ==
Czech Republic:

- Jáchymov, Ore Mountains, Karlovy Vary Region, Czech Republic

France:

- Salsigne mine, Salsigne, Mas-Cabardès, Carcassonne, Aude, Languedoc-Roussillon, France
- Villanière (slag locality), Salsigne, Mas-Cabardès, Carcassonne, Aude, Languedoc-Roussillon, France

Germany:

- Wilhelm Mine (Wechselschacht), Bauhaus, Richelsdorf District, Hesse, Germany
- Ore dumps, Richelsdorf Smelter, Süss, Richelsdorf District, Hesse, Germany
