= Talmessite =

Hydrated calcium magnesium arsenate

Talmesite
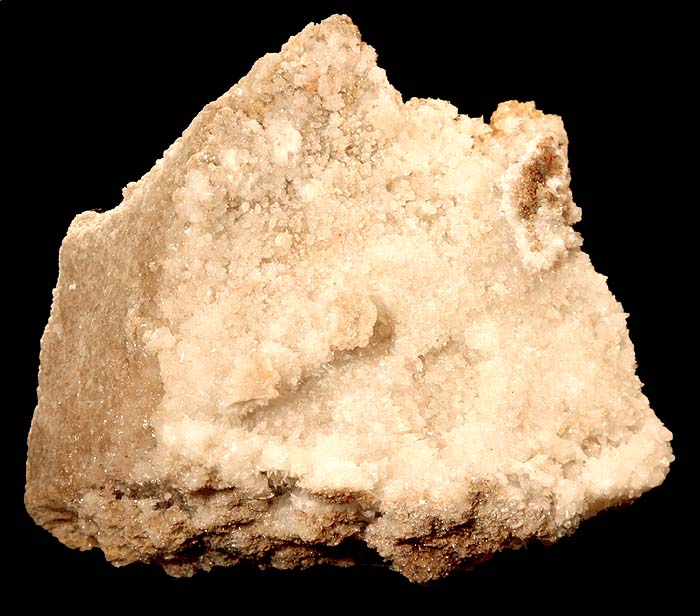
- Talmessite from Gold Hill Mine, Utah, US

General
- Category: Arsenate mineral
- Formula: Ca_{2}Mg(AsO_{4})_{2}·2H_{2}O
- IMA symbol: Tlm
- Strunz classification: 8.CG.05 (10 ed); 7/C.17-50 (8 ed)
- Dana classification: 40.02.02.05
- Crystal system: Triclinic
- Crystal class: Pinacoidal (1̅) (same H-M symbol)
- Space group: P1̅

Identification
- Formula mass: 418.33 g/mol
- Colour: White or colourless, pale green (nickel-rich) or brownish or pink (cobalt-rich). Colourless in transmitted light.
- Crystal habit: Prismatic crystals, radiating fibrous aggregates
- Twinning: Polysynthetic
- Mohs scale hardness: 5
- Lustre: Vitreous
- Streak: White
- Diaphaneity: Transparent to translucent
- Specific gravity: 3.421, cobaltoan varieties 3.574
- Optical properties: Biaxial (–)
- Refractive index: n_{α} = 1.672, n_{β} = 1.685, n_{γ} = 1.698
- Birefringence: δ = 0.026
- Pleochroism: The cobaltoan variety is pleochroic, colourless to pale rose
- Other characteristics: Not radioactive. It loses water of crystallisation at 450^{o}

Talmessite is a hydrated calcium magnesium arsenate, often with significant amounts of cobalt or nickel. It was named in 1960 for the type locality, the Talmessi mine, Anarak district, Iran. It forms a series with β-Roselite, where cobalt replaces some of the magnesium, and with gaitite, where zinc replaces the magnesium. All these minerals are members of the fairfieldite group. Talmessite is dimorphic with wendwilsonite (which is not a member of this group).

== Members of the fairfieldite group ==
- Cassidyite Ca_{2}(Ni^{2+},Mg)(PO_{4})_{2}·2H_{2}O
- Collinsite Ca_{2}(Mg,Fe^{2+})(PO_{4})_{2}·2H_{2}O
- Fairfieldite Ca_{2}(Mn^{2+},Fe^{2+})(PO_{4})_{2}·2H_{2}O
- Gaitite Ca_{2}Zn(AsO_{4})_{2}·2H_{2}O
- Messelite Ca_{2}(Fe^{2+},Mn^{2+})(PO_{4})_{2}·2H_{2}O
- Nickeltalmessite Ca_{2}Ni(AsO_{4})_{2}·2H_{2}O
- Parabrandtite Ca_{2}Mn^{2+}(AsO_{4})_{2}·2H_{2}O
- unnamed (Fe^{2+}-analogue of parabrandtite) Ca_{2}Fe^{2+}(AsO_{4})_{2}·2H_{2}O
- β-Roselite Ca_{2}(Co^{2+},Mg)(AsO_{4})_{2}·2H_{2}O
- Talmessite Ca_{2}Mg(AsO_{4})_{2}·2H_{2}O

== Crystallography ==
The formula for talmessite is Ca_{2}Mg(AsO_{4})_{2}.2H_{2}O. It is a triclinic mineral, crystal class 1̅, space group P1̅. There is one formula unit per unit cell (Z = 1) and the unit cell parameters are variously given as a = 5.87 Å, b = 6.94 Å, c = 5.53 Å, α = 97.3°, β = 108.7°, γ = 108.1°, or a = 5.89 Å, b = 7.69 Å, c = 5.56 Å, α = 112.633°, β = 70.817°, γ = 119.417°,. These values give a calculated specific gravity varying from 3.42 to 3.63.
The structure is dominated by chains of tetrahedral AsO_{4} and octahedral [(cation-O_{4}(H_{2}O)_{2})] groups that parallel the c crystal axis. The octahedral are compressed, resulting in chain disorder

== Appearance ==
Talmessite occurs as prismatic crystals to 3 mm, as radiating fibrous aggregates or as fine crystalline aggregates; it may also be stalactitic or in crusts. Pure talmessite is white or colourless, and colourless in transmitted light, but nickel-rich varieties are pale green and cobalt-rich varieties may be brownish, pink or the purple colour typical of many cobalt minerals. The streak is white and crystals are transparent to translucent with a vitreous lustre.

== Physical properties ==
Talmessite is a moderately hard mineral, with Mohs hardness 5, harder than fluorite but not as hard as quartz. The specific gravity calculated from the formula and the cell dimensions is 3.49, but the measured value is less for ordinary talmessite, at 3.42 and more for the cobaltoan variety, at 3.57. The mineral displays polysynthetic twinning. It is not radioactive and it loses water of crystallisation at 450^{o}.

== Optical properties ==
Triclinic crystals (and orthorhombic and monoclinic crystals) have two directions in which light travels with zero birefringence; these directions are called the optic axes, and the crystal is said to be biaxial. Talmessite is triclinic, so it is biaxial.
The speed of a ray of light travelling through the crystal differs with direction. The direction of the fastest ray is called the X direction and the direction of the slowest ray is called the Z direction. X and Z are perpendicular to each other, and a third direction Y is defined as perpendicular to both X and Z; light travelling along Y has an intermediate speed. Refractive index is inversely proportional to speed, so the refractive indices for the X, Y and Z directions increase from X to Z. The refractive indices are n_{α} = 1.672, n_{β} = 1.685 and n_{γ} = 1.698 with slightly higher values for the cobaltoan variety of n_{α} = 1.695 and n_{γ} = 1.73 (n_{β} not specified). The maximum birefringence δ is the difference between the highest and lowest refractive index; for talmessite δ = 0.026.
The angle between the two optic axes is called the optic angle, 2V, and it is always acute, and bisected either by X or by Z. If Z is the bisector then the crystal is said to be positive, and if X is the bisector it is said to be negative. Talmessite may be biaxial (–) or biaxial (+). The measured value of 2V is about 90^{o}. Also 2V can be calculated from the values of the refractive indices, giving a value of 88°
2V depends on the refractive indices, but refractive index varies with wavelength, and hence with colour. So 2V also depends on the colour, and is different for red and for violet light. This effect is called dispersion of the optic axes, or just dispersion (not to be confused with chromatic dispersion). If 2V is greater for red light than for violet light the dispersion is designated r > v, and vice versa. For talmessite dispersion is strong, with r > v. The cobaltoan variety is pleochroic colourless to pale rose.

== Occurrence ==
Talmessite is a rare secondary mineral formed typically in the oxidized zone of some hydrothermal mineral deposits, as an alteration product of realgar, orpiment, or Cu–Ni arsenides. Cobalt-rich varieties are found in the oxidised zone of cobalt arsenide deposits. It occurs associated with gaitite, erythrite, annabergite, picropharmacolite, pharmacolite, austinite, fluorite, baryte, aragonite, calcite and dolomite. At the type locality it is associated with aragonite and dolomite.

== Localities ==
The type locality is the Talmessi Mine, Anarak District, Nain County, Esfahan Province, Iran, and type material is conserved at the École nationale supérieure des mines de Paris, France and at the Natural History Museum, London, England.
