= Kaňkite =

Kankite
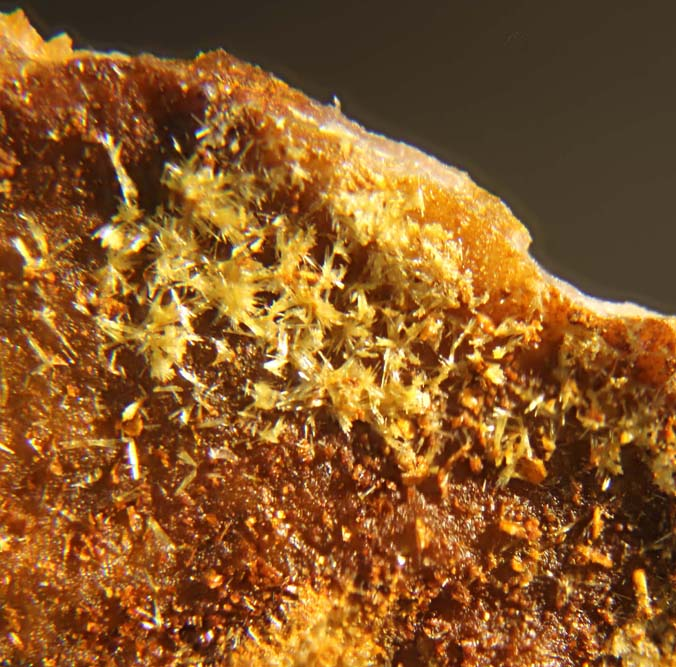
- Kaňkite found in the Czech Republic

General
- Category: Arsenate mineral
- Formula: Fe^{3+}AsO_{4}·3.5(H_{2}O)
- IMA symbol: Kňk
- Strunz classification: 8.CE.60
- Crystal system: Monoclinic; Unknown space group
- Unit cell: a = 18.803(15), b = 17.490(18) c = 7.633(5) [Å]; β = 92.72°; z = 16

Identification
- Formula mass: 257.82 g/mol
- Color: Yellowish–green
- Crystal habit: Tabular spearlike crystals in spherulites and botryoidal encrustations
- Fracture: Uneven
- Mohs scale hardness: 2–3
- Luster: Dull to vitreous
- Streak: Grayish yellow
- Diaphaneity: Translucent
- Specific gravity: 2.60 – 2.70
- Optical properties: Biaxial
- Refractive index: n_{α} = 1.664 n_{γ} = 1.680

Kankite is a mineral with the chemical formula Fe^{3+}AsO_{4}·3.5(H_{2}O). Kankite is named for the locality that yielded first specimens Kaňk, Czech Republic. Kankite formation is associated with old (1200- to 1400-year-old) mine dumps. It is yellowish-green on fresh exposure, with a paler greenish yellow on exposure to air.

== Properties ==
Kankite is a monoclinic mineral, meaning it is a mineral system having 3 unequal axes of which one is at right angles with the other two. It has an uneven fracture and has a hardness of 2–3 (gypsum–calcite). It is translucent yellowish green in color with a grayish-yellow streak. Its luster is dull to vitreous. Kankite contains the elements arsenic, iron, hydrogen and oxygen. It was approved by the IMA in 1976. Its habit is botryoidal, "grape-like" rounded forms (e.g. malachite). It forms encrustations, crust-like aggregates on matrix. The specific gravity of Kankite is 2.70.

== Occurrences ==
Kankite was first described in 1976 for an occurrence in the Kaňk, Kutná Hora, Bohemia, Czech Republic. It is a rare secondary mineral in highly weathered mine dumps containing arsenopyrite (in the Czech Republic). It occurs in association with scorodite, pitticite, parascorodite, zykaite, arsenopyrite, vajdakite, native arsenic, pyrite, proustite, gypsum, “limonite” and quartz.

It has also been reported from Munzig near Meissen; from Brand-Erbisdorf, Saxony; from Menzenschwand, Black Forest in Germany. It occurs at King's Wood mine, Buckfastleigh, Devon, and from the South Terras mine, St. Stephen-in-Brannel, Cornwall in England. It has also been reported from the Suzukura mine north-northeast of Enzan, Yamanashi Prefecture, Japan.
