= Pharmacosiderite =

Hydrated basic ferric arsenate

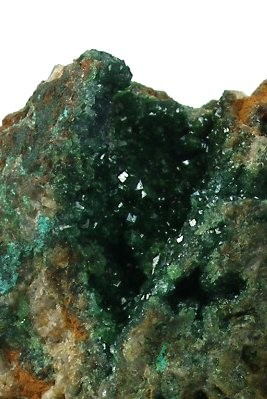

General
- Category: Arsenate minerals
- Formula: KFe_{4}(AsO_{4})_{3}(OH)_{4}·(6-7)H_{2}O
- IMA symbol: Pmsd
- Strunz classification: 8.DK.10
- Crystal system: Isometric
- Crystal class: Hextetrahedral (4̅3m); H-M symbol: (4̅ 3m)
- Space group: P4̅3m

Identification
- Formula mass: 873.38 g/mol
- Color: Greens, browns, yellows
- Crystal habit: Massive to Crystalline
- Cleavage: Distinct on the [100]
- Fracture: Brittle
- Mohs scale hardness: 2.5
- Luster: Adamantine
- Streak: yellowish green
- Diaphaneity: Subtransparent to subtranslucent
- Density: 2.9 g/cm^{3}
- Ultraviolet fluorescence: None

Pharmacosiderite is a hydrated basic ferric arsenate, with the chemical formula KFe_{4}(AsO_{4})_{3}(OH)_{4}·(6-7)H_{2}O and a molecular weight of 873.38 g/mol. It consists of the elements arsenic, iron, hydrogen, potassium, sodium and oxygen. It has a Mohs hardness of 2 to 3, about that of a finger nail. Its specific gravity is about 2.7 to 2.9, has indistinct cleavage, and is usually transparent or translucent. It has a yellow or white streak and a yellow, green, brown or red color. Its lustre is adamantine, vitreous and resinous, and it has conchoidal, brittle and sectile fracture.

Pharmacosiderite has an isometric crystal system, with yellowish-green, sharply defined cube crystals. Its crystals are doubly refracting, and exhibit a banded structure in polarized light. When placed in ammonium solution, a crystal changes color to a distinguishing red. Upon placing it into dilute hydrochloric acid the original color is restored. This secondary origin mineral is normally formed in the oxidation zones of ore deposits. The alteration of arsenopyrite, tennantite and other primary arsenates can form pharmacosiderite. It can also form from the precipitation of hydrothermal solutions, but only rarely. It can be found in abundance in Cornwall, Hungary and the U.S. state of Utah. When it was first discovered, pharmacosiderite was known as cube ore. The present name, given by J. F. L. Hausmann in 1813, is made up of the Greek words for arsenic and iron, the two most significant consisting elements. Pharmakos means poison, which is related to arsenic, and sideros means iron. Pharmacolite and picropharmacolite, which are different arsenates, are not associated besides via nomenclature. Siderite, a carbonate mineral, only shares the common element iron with pharmacosiderite.
