= Fluckite =

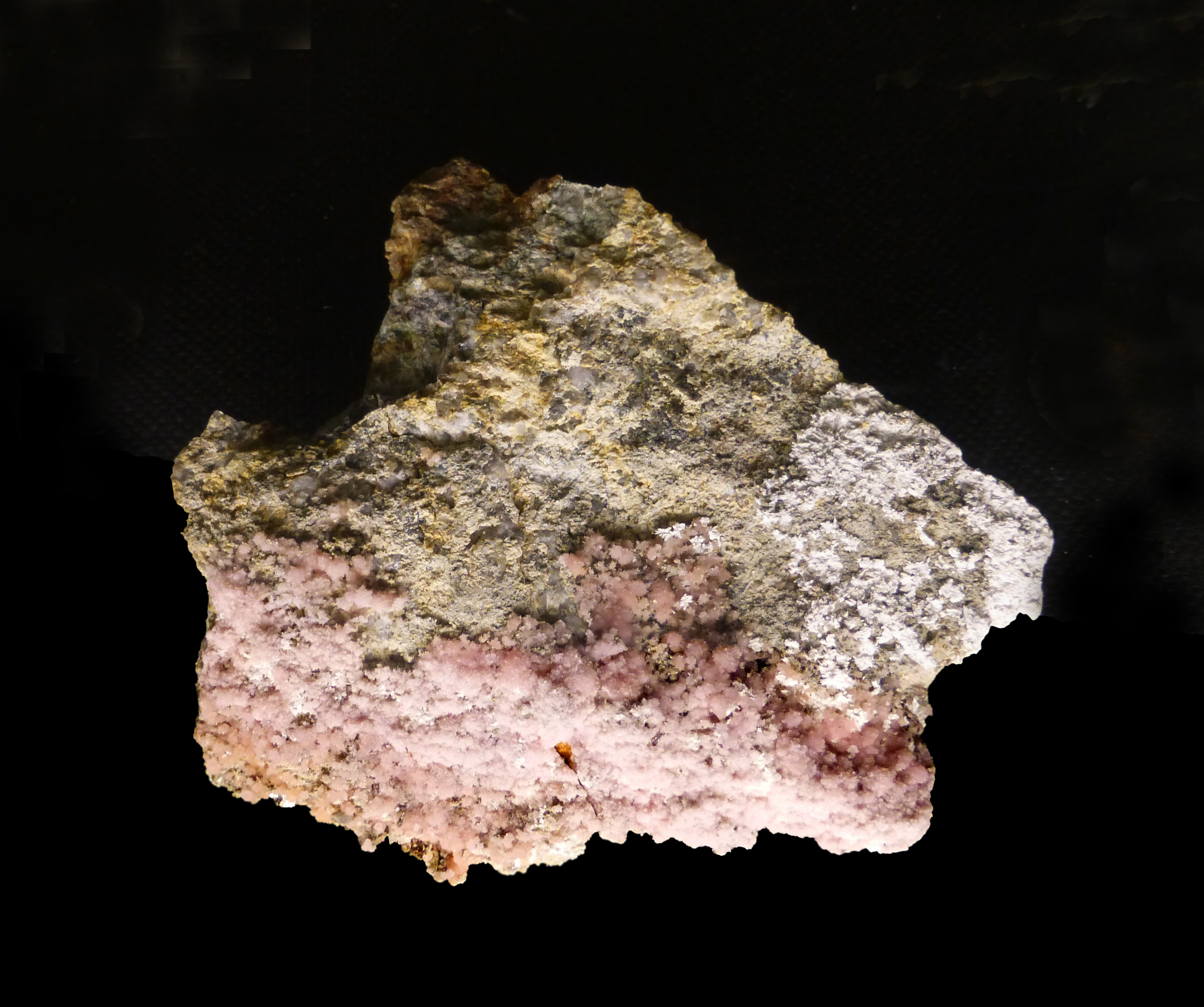
- Fluckite from the Gabe-Gottes Mine

General
- Category: Arsenate minerals
- Formula: CaMnH_{2}(AsO_{4})_{2}·2(H_{2}O)
- IMA symbol: Fck
- Strunz classification: 8.CB.15
- Crystal system: Triclinic
- Crystal class: Pinacoidal (1̅) (same H-M symbol)
- Space group: P1̅
- Unit cell: a = 8.459, b = 7.613 c = 6.968 [Å]; α = 82.21° β = 98.25°, γ = 95.86°; Z = 2

Identification
- Color: Colorless, Light to Dark Pink
- Crystal habit: Crystals prismatic, typically radiating to spherulitic
- Cleavage: (010) perfect, (100) good, (101) indistinct
- Mohs scale hardness: 3.5-4
- Luster: Subvitreous, waxy
- Streak: White
- Diaphaneity: Translucent
- Specific gravity: 3.05
- Optical properties: Biaxial (+), probable
- Refractive index: n_{α} = 1.618 n_{β} = 1.627 n_{γ}= 1.642
- Birefringence: 0.024
- 2V angle: Large

Fluckite is an arsenate mineral with the chemical formula CaMnH_{2}(AsO_{4})_{2}·2(H_{2}O).

Fluckite's mineral crystallography is triclinic meaning it has three axes of different length and three different interior angles that do not equal 90°. Because fluckite possesses three axes with different angles and lengths it is an anisotropic mineral. This means that it has more than one optic axis. This mineral is a member of the P1̅ space group meaning that it can be rotated 360° degrees and inverted to obtain the original figure. Optically, this mineral has positive biaxial birefringence, which can be shown obtaining an interference figure that is blue in the upper right and lower left quadrants of the figure while looking down the c- axis. Fluckite possesses moderate optical relief which is the degree to which the mineral stands out from the mounting medium.

== Occurrence ==
Fluckite was first described in 1980 for an occurrence in the Gabe-Gottes Mine in Haut-Rhin, Alsace, France, and named for mineralogist Pierre Fluck of Louis Pasteur University in Strasbourg, France. The mineral was found in at a depth of 100 m (330 ft). It occurs as a post-mine phase on carbonate gangue. It occurs in association with native arsenic, tennantite, skutterudite, sainfeldite, pharmacolite, villyaellenite, picropharmacolite, calcite, dolomite, ankerite and quartz.
