= Xanthiosite =

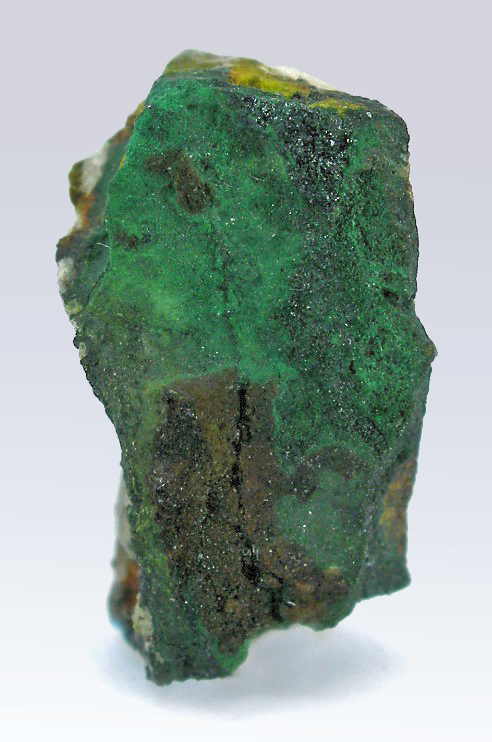
- Xanthiosite and aerugite

General
- Category: Arsenate mineral
- Formula: Ni_{3}(AsO_{4})_{2}
- IMA symbol: Xth
- Strunz classification: 8.AB.25
- Crystal system: Monoclinic
- Crystal class: Prismatic (2/m) (same H-M symbol)
- Space group: P2_{1}/a

Identification
- Formula mass: 453.91 g/mol
- Color: Golden yellow
- Mohs scale hardness: 4
- Diaphaneity: Translucent
- Specific gravity: 5.37–5.47

Xanthiosite is a nickel arsenate mineral. It was first discovered in Germany in 1858 and named by Gilbert Joseph Adam in 1869.

== Deposits ==
The type locality of Xanthiosite is Johanngeorgenstadt, it may also be found in Greece.
