= Warikahnite =

Rare zinc arsenate mineral

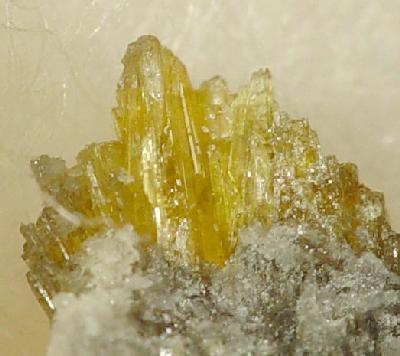
- Warikahnite, Tsumeb mine, Namibia, 0.6 × 0.4 × 0.1 cm

General
- Category: Arsenate minerals
- Formula: Zn_{3}(AsO_{4})_{2}·2H_{2}O
- IMA symbol: War
- Strunz classification: 8.CA.35
- Crystal system: Triclinic
- Crystal class: Pinacoidal (1̅) (same H-M symbol)
- Space group: P1̅
- Unit cell: a = 6.71 Å, b = 8.98 Å c = 14.53 Å; α = 105.59° β = 93.44°, γ = 108.68°; Z = 4

Identification
- Formula mass: 510.04 g/mol
- Color: Pale yellow to colorless; honey-yellow; orange
- Crystal habit: Acicular; radial
- Cleavage: [001] perfect, [010] good, [100] good
- Fracture: Brittle
- Mohs scale hardness: 2
- Luster: Vitreous, waxy
- Streak: White
- Diaphaneity: Transparent
- Specific gravity: 4.28
- Optical properties: Biaxial (+)
- Refractive index: n_{α} = 1.747 n_{β} = 1.753 n_{γ} = 1.768
- Birefringence: δ = 0.021
- 2V angle: 75° measured

Warikahnite is a rare zinc arsenate mineral of the triclinic crystal system with Hermann-Mauguin notation 1̅, belonging to the space group P1̅. It occurs in the Tsumeb mine in Namibia on corroded tennantite in the second oxidation zone under hydrothermal conditions in a dolomite-hosted polymetallic ore deposit. It is associated with adamite, stranskiite, koritnigite, claudetite, tsumcorite, and ludlockite. The origin of discovery was in a dolomite ore formation within an oxidized hydrothermal zone, in the E9 pillar, 31st level of the Tsumeb Mine in Namibia, Southwest Africa. It has also been found at Lavrion, Greece and Plaka, Greece as microscopic white needles.

== Discovery ==
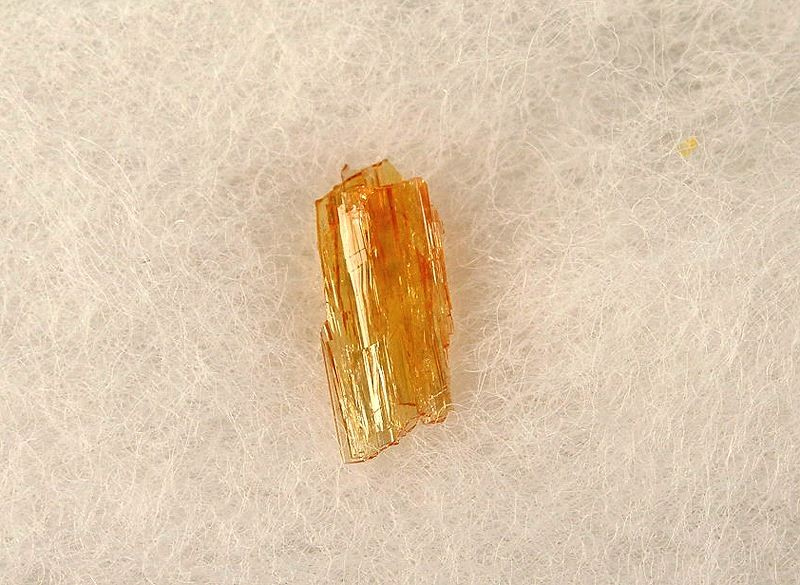
Warikahnite, Tsumeb mine, Namibia, 0.9 × 0.4 × 0.1 cm

Warikahnite was discovered by Clive Queit at Tsumeb mine and was first described in 1979 by Keller, Hess, and Dunn. The name "warikahnite" honors Walter Richard Kahn, who was born in 1911. He was from Bad Bayersoien, Germany, and he was a dealer and collector that specialized in Tsumeb minerals. He was honored due to his support of research into rare secondary minerals. The type material is located at the University of Stuttgart, the Smithsonian Institution, and Harvard University.

== Physical properties ==
Warikahnite has perfect cleavage on the c-axis {001}; and good cleavage on both the a- and b-axes ({100} and {010}). It has bladed subhedral crystals up to 3 × .5 × .5 mm, elongated on {100} and flattened on {010}, with a hardness of approximately 2 as presented in table two. Its specific gravity is 4.24 and it exhibits a colorless to pale yellow hue, along with a white streak and vitreous luster. This triclinic 1̅ specimen classified under the space group P1̅ features striated crystals up to two centimetres in radial to subparallel aggregates. The Handbook of Mineralogy further states the cell dimensions of biaxial Warikahnite to be calculated as a = 6.710(1) Å, b = 8.989(2) Å, and c = 14.533(2) Å, with unit cell volume as 788.58 Å.

== Crystal structure ==
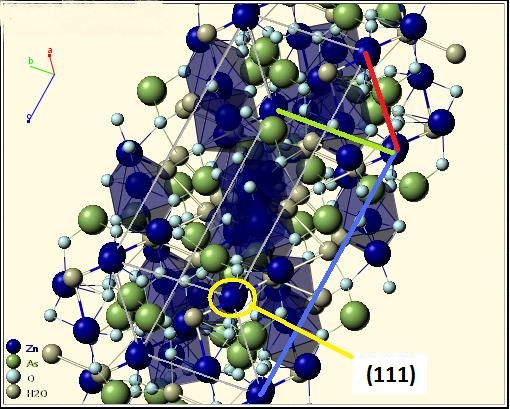
Structure

The crystal structure of Warikahnite, determined from diffractometer data, contained six various coordination polyhedra of zinc with components of As, O, and H_{2}O; with the coordination numbers six, five, and four; and with five different combinations of ligand. The "Die Kristallstruktur von Warikahnit" article also notes that the hydrogen bonds are discussed appertaining to both charge balance and infrared spectra. Recent data shows the Gladstone-Dale relation compatibility of warikahnite is ranked as superior (−0.010).

== Chemical composition ==
Warikahnite has the chemical formula Zn_{3}(AsO_{4})_{2}·2H_{2}O. Along with arsenate ions (AsO_{4})^{3−}, the infrared spectrum revealed H_{2}O. These water molecules present in the warikahnite sample were determined by thermo gravimetric analysis, and lost at 365 °C. Both H_{2}O and (AsO_{4})^{3−} readily dissolved when hot hydrochloric acid (HCL) or nitric acid (HNO_{3}) were added to the specimen. After a microprobe analysis, the weight percent oxides were calculated as follows in the table directly below.

| Chem For. | Name | % |
|---|---|---|
| As_{2}O_{5} | (arsenic pentoxide) | 44.33% |
| ZnO | (zinc oxide) | 47.85% |
| MnO | (manganese oxide) | 0.40% |
| FeO | (iron oxide) | 0.19% |
| H_{2}O | (water) | 6.32% |
| Total | | 99.09% |

== Geologic occurrence ==
Warikahnite's only known localities to date are the Tsumeb Mine in Namibia, South West Africa; and Plaka and Lavrion, Greece. The first discovery of this type specimen in the mine was found with white koritnigite, blue stranskiite, pale to emerald-green cuprian adamite, crystals of helmutwinklerite, and white corroded crystals of claudetite, ludlockite, tsumcorite, and lavendulan; while the second acquisition was only linked to quartz.

== See also ==
- List of minerals

== Literature ==
- Keller, P., H. Hess, and P.J. Dunn (1979) Warikahnit, Zn3[(H2O)2|(AsO4)2], ein neues Mineral aus Tsumeb, Südwestafrika. Neues Jahrb. Mineral., Monatsh., 389–395.
- Riffel, H., P. Keller, and H. Hess (1980) Die Kristallstruktur von Warikahnit, Zn3[(H2O)2|(AsO4)2]. Tschermaks Mineral. Petrog. Mitt., 27, 187–199.
