= Weilite =

Arsenite mineral

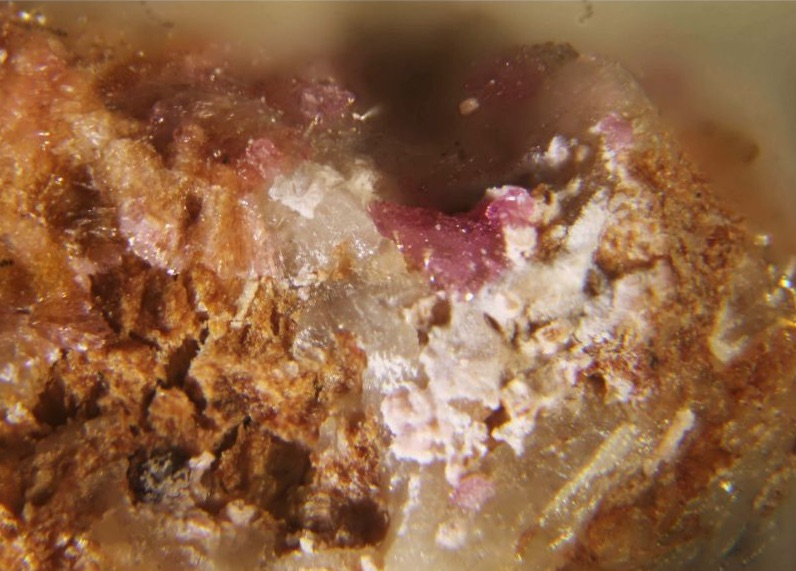
- Weilite (white) with pink erythrite from Richelsdorf District, Wildeck, Hesse, Germany

General
- Category: Arsenate mineral
- Formula: CaHAsO_{4}
- IMA symbol: Wei
- Strunz classification: 8.AD.10
- Crystal system: Triclinic
- Crystal class: Pinacoidal (1̅) (same H-M symbol)
- Space group: P1̅
- Unit cell: a = 7.059 Å, b = 6.891 Å c = 7.201 Å; α = 97.43° β = 103.55°, γ = 87.75°; Z = 4

Identification
- Color: White
- Crystal habit: Powdery, massive
- Fracture: Irregular/uneven
- Tenacity: Brittle
- Luster: Waxy, greasy, dull
- Streak: White
- Diaphaneity: Translucent
- Specific gravity: 3.48
- Optical properties: Biaxial (-)
- Refractive index: n_{α} = 1.644 n_{γ} = 1.688
- Birefringence: δ = 0.044
- 2V angle: Measured: 81°

Weilite (CaHAsO_{4}) is a rare arsenate mineral. It is a translucent white triclinic mineral with a waxy luster.

It was first described in 1963 for occurrences in Gabe Gottes Mine, Haut-Rhin, Alsace, France; Wittichen, Schenkenzell, Black Forest, Baden-Württemberg, Germany; and the Schneeberg District, Erzgebirge, Saxony, Germany. It is named after French mineralogist René Weil of the University of Strasbourg. It occurs in the oxidized zone of arsenic-bearing hydrothermal veins. It occurs as an alteration product of pharmacolite and haidingerite.
