= Vladimirite =

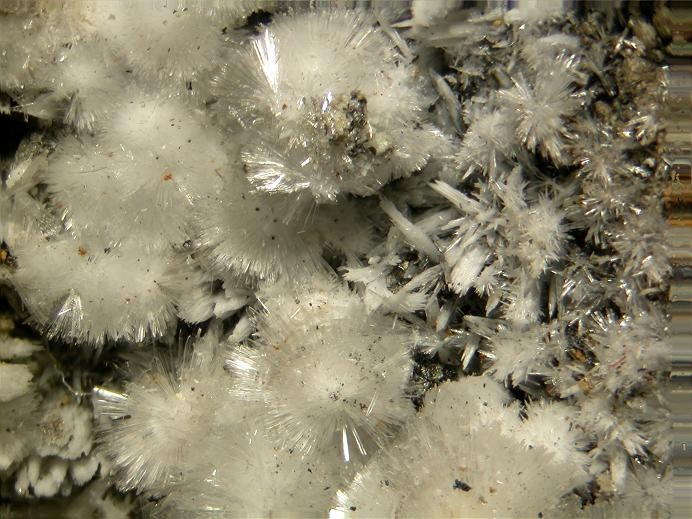

General
- Category: Arsenate minerals
- Formula: Ca_{5}(HAsO_{4})_{2}(AsO_{4})_{2}·5H_{2}O
- IMA symbol: Vld
- Strunz classification: 8.CJ.25
- Crystal system: Monoclinic
- Crystal class: Prismatic (2/m) (same H-M symbol)
- Space group: P2_{1}/c
- Unit cell: a = 5.81 Å, b = 10.19 Å c = 22.7 Å; β = 97.32°; Z = 3

Identification
- Formula mass: 848.16 g/mol
- Color: Pale rose, colorless, white
- Crystal habit: As acicular/bladed crystals occurring in cross-fiber veinlets; spherulitic
- Twinning: Penetration
- Cleavage: Good one plane
- Tenacity: Brittle
- Mohs scale hardness: 3.5
- Luster: Sub-vitreous, silky, pearly
- Streak: White
- Diaphaneity: Transparent
- Specific gravity: 3.17
- Optical properties: Biaxial (-)
- Refractive index: n_{α} = 1.650 - 1.651 n_{β} = 1.654 - 1.656 n_{γ} = 1.656 - 1.661
- Birefringence: δ = 0.006 - 0.010
- Pleochroism: Non-pleochroic
- 2V angle: Measured: 70°

Vladimirite is a rare calcium arsenate mineral with a formula of Ca_{5}(HAsO_{4})_{2}(AsO_{4})_{2}·5H_{2}O. It is named after the Vladimirovskoye deposit in Russia, where it was discovered in the 1950s.

Vladimirite is monoclinic-prismatic, which means crystallographically, it contains three axes of unequal length and the angles between two of the axes are 90 degrees, and one is less than 90 degrees. It belongs to the space group P2_{1}/c. The mineral also has an orthorhombic polytype. In terms of its optical properties, vladimirite is anisotropic which means the velocity of light varies depending on direction through the mineral. Relief is a diagnostic characteristic of a mineral in plane polarized light that refers to the various ways different minerals "stand out". Vladimirite's calculated relief is 1.65-1.661, which is moderate. It is colorless in plane polarized light, and it is weakly pleochroic. Pleochroism is the variety of colors under plane polarized light displayed by crystals at various angles.

== Occurrence ==
Vladimirite was first described in 1953 at two deposits in Russia, the Khovu-Aksy nickel-cobalt deposit, Tuva Republic, and the Vladimirovskoye cobalt deposit, Altai Mountains, Altaiskii Krai, Siberia. It is a secondary mineral in the oxidized zone of arsenic-bearing ore deposits. It occurs with picropharmacolite, erythrite and aragonite. It has been reported from the Richelsdorf Mountains, Hesse, Germany; the Bou Azzer district, Morocco and the Mohawk mine, Keweenaw County, Michigan.
