= Machatschkiite =

Arsenate mineral

General
- Category: arsenate
- Group: Machatschkiite–Rauenthalite
- Formula: (Ca,Na)_{6}(AsO_{4})(HAsO_{4})3(PO_{4},SO_{4}) · 15H_{2}O
- IMA symbol: CNMNC
- IMA status: approved
- Crystal system: trigonal
- Crystal class: ditrigonal pyramidal

Identification
- Color: colorless
- Crystal habit: pseudorhombohedral
- Cleavage: none observed
- Fracture: conchoidal
- Mohs scale hardness: 2 - 3
- Specific gravity: 2.5 - 2.6 g/cm^{3}

Machatschkiite is a hydrous calcium arsenate mineral that was discovered in 1977. It was first discovered by German mineralogist Kurt Walenta, who found the first and (to date) only occurrence at the Anton Mine in the Heubach Valley, near Schiltach in the Black Forest of Baden-Württemberg, Germany. Single crystal X-Ray shows it crystallizes in space group R3c.

== Summary of machatschkiite ==
Machatschkiite has a 3:2 calcium to arsenic ratio. It occurs as a secondary mineral in granite, gypsum, pharmacolite, picropharmacolite, and sainfeldite. The crystal structure was determined by direct methods such as fourier syntheses. It is an extremely rare and has only been identified at the Anton Mine in Germany. The atomic arrangement of makhachkiite has a new type of structure and is the first example in which three oxygens of the AsO_{4} group. Machatschkiite is also easily soluble in diluted HCl and HNO_{3}

Machatschkitte is a relatively soft mineral with a MOH hardness of 2.5. It has a slightly higher density than quartz (with Machatschkitte having a density of 2.9 g/cm³ while quartz has a density of 2.65 g/cm³). Machatschkiite has no industrial use. It is purely for scientific and collector's due to its extreme rarity.

= References =
