= Andyrobertsite =

Rare blue-colored mineral

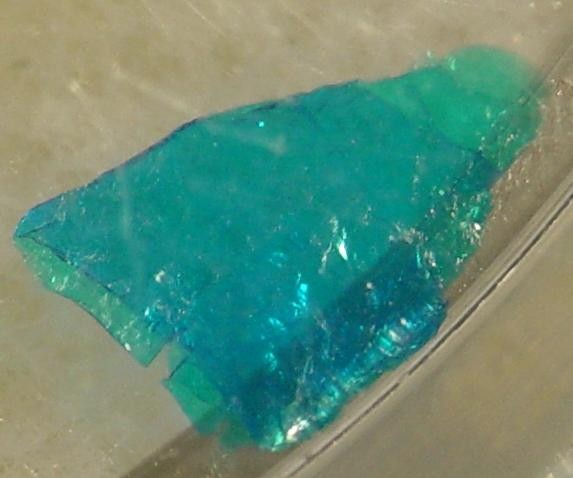
- A mixture of andyrobertsite (blue) and calcioandyrobertsite (green), holotype specimen; size: 3.3×2.2×1.0 mm

General
- Category: Arsenate mineral
- Formula: KCdCu_{5}(AsO_{4})_{4}(H_{2}AsO_{4})·2H_{2}O
- IMA symbol: Arb
- Strunz classification: 8.DH.50 08
- Dana classification: 42.09.02.03
- Crystal system: Monoclinic
- Crystal class: Prismatic (2/m) (same H-M symbol)
- Space group: P2_{1}/m
- Unit cell: a = 9.81, b = 10.034 c = 9.975 [Å]; β = 101.83°; Z = 2

Identification
- Color: Blue
- Crystal habit: Platy
- Cleavage: {100} good
- Mohs scale hardness: 3
- Luster: Vitreous
- Streak: Pale blue
- Diaphaneity: Transparent
- Specific gravity: 4
- Optical properties: Biaxial (-)
- Refractive index: n_{α} = 1.72, n_{β} = 1.749, n_{γ} = 1.757
- Birefringence: δ = 0.037

Andyrobertsite is a rare, complex arsenate mineral with a blue color. It is found in the Tsumeb mine in Namibia and named after Andrew C. Roberts (b. 1950), mineralogist with the Geological Survey of Canada. A Ca-rich analogue (with Ca instead of Cd) is called calcioandyrobertsite and has a more greenish tint.
