= Arhbarite =

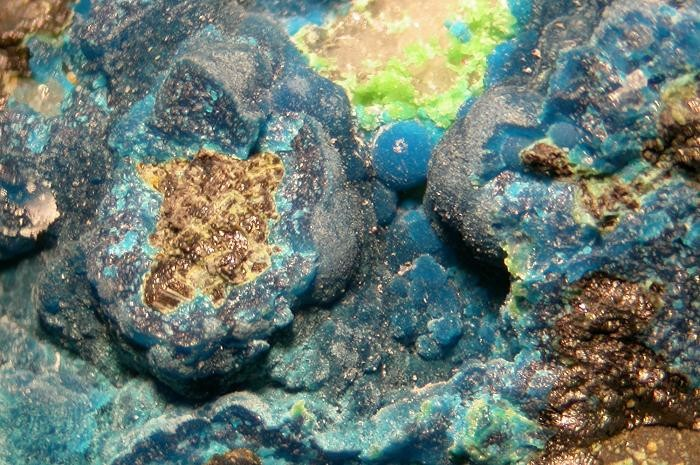
- Arhbarite found in Chile

General
- Category: Minerals
- Formula: Cu_{2}Mg(AsO_{4})(OH)_{3}
- IMA symbol: Arh

Identification
- Color: Dark blue to medium blue
- Luster: Sub-Vitreous, Waxy
- Specific gravity: 3.71

Arhbarite (IMA symbol: Arh) is a copper magnesium arsenate mineral with the chemical formula Cu_{2}Mg(AsO_{4})(OH)_{3}. It is named after its type locality, the Arhbar mine in Ouarzazate Province in Drâa-Tafilalet, Morocco.
