= Akrochordite =

Arsenate mineral

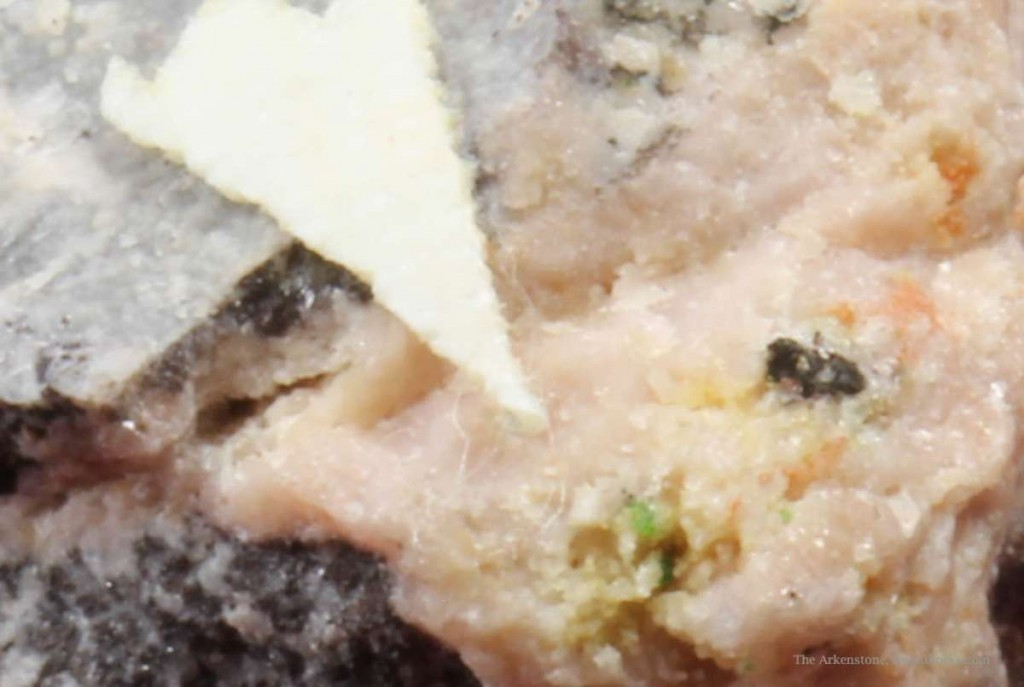
- Bright green, vitreous, cluster of eveite (under 0.5 mm) and brown, subhedral akrochordite in a contrasting, pink, granular carbonate matrix

General
- Category: Phosphate minerals
- Formula: (Mn,Mg)_{4}(AsO_{4})_{2}(OH)_{4}·4H_{2}O
- IMA symbol: Akr
- Strunz classification: 8.DD.10
- Crystal system: Monoclinic
- Crystal class: Prismatic (2/m) (same H-M symbol)
- Space group: P2_{1}/c

Identification
- Color: Yellowish red-brown, pale to dark brown, pale pink
- Cleavage: Perfect. On {010} , perfect; a second, perpendicular to the first.
- Tenacity: Brittle
- Mohs scale hardness: 3 1/2
- Luster: Sub-Vitreous, resinous, dull
- Diaphaneity: Translucent

Akrochordite is a rare hydrated arsenate mineral with the chemical formula (Mn,Mg)_{4}(AsO_{4})_{2}(OH)_{4}·4H_{2}O and represents a small group of rare manganese (Mn) arsenates and, similarly to most other Mn-bearing arsenates, possess pinkish colour. It is typically associated with metamorphic Mn deposits.
