= Sincosite =

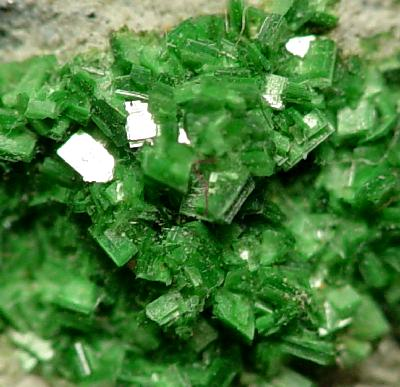
- Sincosite with an associated spray of white, acicular minyulite; from Ross Hannibal Mine, South Dakota, US

General
- Category: Vanadate minerals
- Formula: CaV_{2}(PO_{4})_{2}O_{2} . 5H_{2}O
- IMA symbol: Scs
- Strunz classification: 8.CJ.65
- Crystal system: Tetragonal
- Crystal class: Ditetragonal dipyramidal (4/mmm); H-M symbol: (4/m 2/m 2/m)
- Space group: P4_{2}/nnm

Identification
- Tenacity: Brittle
- Mohs scale hardness: 1 - 2
- Luster: Vitreous, Pearly, Sub-Metallic, Dull

Sincosite is a green mineral discovered in 1922. It is named for Sincos, Daniel Alcides Carrión Province, Peru, where it was first discovered.
