= Zincolivenite =

Copper zinc arsenate mineral

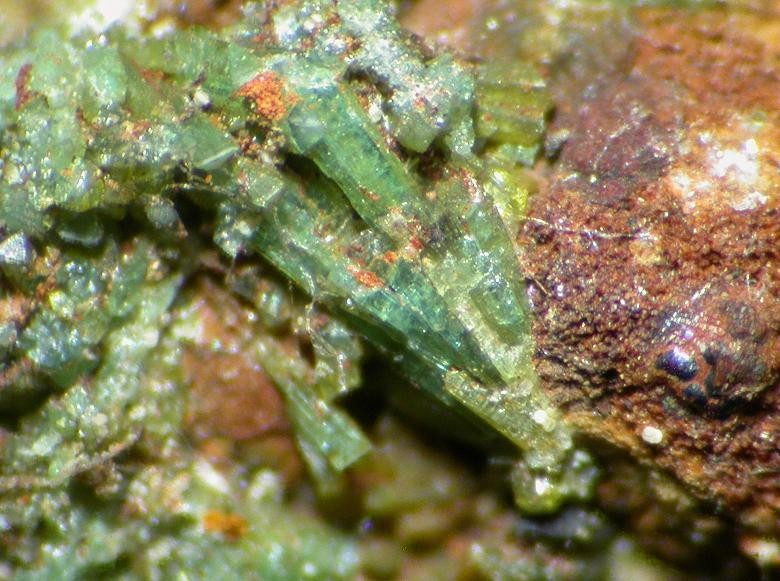
- Zincolivenite from Agios Konstantinos, Lavrion District Mines, Lavreotiki District, East Attica Prefecture, Greece

General
- Category: Arsenate mineral
- Formula: CuZn(AsO_{4})(OH)
- IMA symbol: Zoli
- Strunz classification: 8.BB.30
- Dana classification: 41.06.06.06
- Crystal system: Orthorhombic
- Crystal class: Dipyramidal (mmm); H-M symbol: (2/m 2/m 2/m)
- Space group: Pnnm
- Unit cell: a = 8.5839(15) Å b = 8.5290(13) Å c = 5.9696(9) Å; Z = 4

Identification
- Color: Green, greenish blue
- Crystal habit: Prismatic crystals, radiating
- Cleavage: Perfect on {010}, imperfect on {101}
- Fracture: Conchoidal
- Tenacity: Brittle
- Mohs scale hardness: 3.5
- Luster: Vitreous
- Streak: White
- Diaphaneity: Translucent
- Specific gravity: 4.33
- Optical properties: Biaxial (-)
- Refractive index: n_{α} = 1.736(2) n_{β} = 1.784(2) n_{γ} = 1.788(2)
- Birefringence: 0.052
- Pleochroism: Weak X = light bluish green, Y = Z = light blue
- 2V angle: Measured: 30°
- Dispersion: r > v, very strong
- Extinction: Parallel extinction

Zincolivenite is a copper zinc arsenate mineral with formula CuZn(AsO_{4})(OH) that is a member of the olivenite group. Its colors range from green to blue, and its name comes from its composition of zinc and olivenite.

It was first described from St Constantine, Lavrion District Mines, Laurium, Attica, Greece. It was approved by the International Mineralogical Association in 2006.
