= Keyite =

Mineral

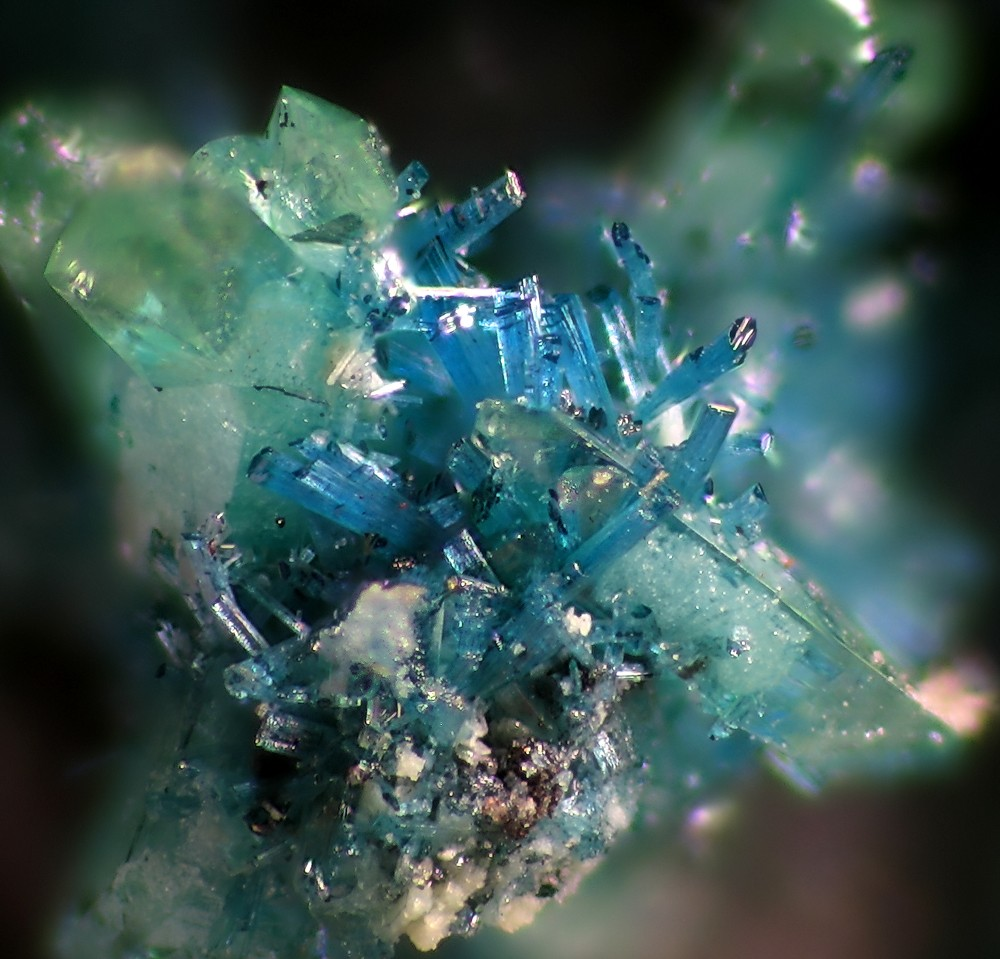
- Keyite on adamite (greenish)

General
- Category: Arsenate minerals
- Formula: Cu^{2+}_{3}Zn_{4}Cd_{2}(AsO_{4})_{6} · 2H_{2}O
- IMA symbol: Key
- Strunz classification: 8.CA.50
- Crystal system: Monoclinic
- Crystal class: Prismatic (2/m) (same H-M symbol)
- Space group: I2/a
- Unit cell: a = 11.654(3) Å b = 12.780(5) Å c = 6.840(3) Å β = 99.11°; Z = 2

Identification
- Formula mass: 1,520.19 g/mol
- Color: azure/ blue
- Crystal habit: prismatic, tabular
- Cleavage: good (001) cleavage
- Mohs scale hardness: 3.5 - 4
- Streak: light blue
- Diaphaneity: translucent
- Density: 5.106g/cm^{3}
- Optical properties: biaxial
- Refractive index: nα = 1.800, nβ, and nγ = 1.870
- Birefringence: 0.070
- Pleochroism: x: pale blue, y: greenish blue, z: deep blue

Keyite is a mineral with the chemical formula Cu^{2+}_{3}Zn_{4}Cd_{2}(AsO_{4})_{6} · 2H_{2}O. The name comes from Charles Locke Key (born 1935), an American mineral dealer who furnished its first specimens. Keyite is monoclinic-prismatic, meaning its crystal form has three unequal axes, two of which have 90° angles between them and one with an angle less than 90°. Keyite belongs to the biaxial optical class, meaning it has more than one axis of anisotropy (optic axis), in which light travels with zero birefringence, and three indices of refraction, nα = 1.800, nβ, and nγ = 1.870. Being a very rare cadmium copper arsenate, keyite is only found in Tsumeb, Namibia in the Tsumeb mine, a world-famous copper mine known for its abundance of rare and unusual minerals.
