= Atelestite =

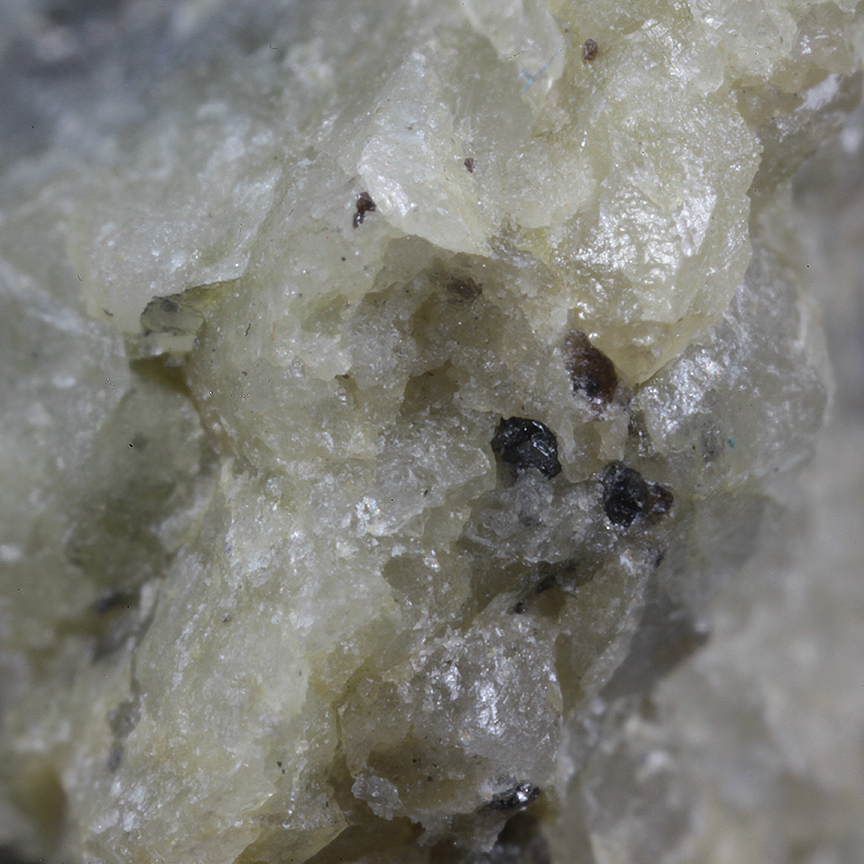
- Atelestite crystals

General
- Category: Minerals
- Formula: Bi_{2}(AsO_{4})O(OH)
- IMA symbol: Ale

Identification
- Color: Sulphur-yellow to yellowish-green, wax-yellow, yellow-brown
- Cleavage: {001}, indistinct
- Mohs scale hardness: 4.5-5
- Luster: Adamantine, Resinous
- Specific gravity: 7.14

Atelestite is an arsenate mineral with the chemical formula Bi_{2}(AsO_{4})O(OH). Its type locality is Erzgebirgskreis, Saxony, Germany.
