= Sewardite =

Rare arsenate mineral

General
- Category: Arsenate minerals
- Formula: CaFe_{2}^{+3}(AsO_{4})_{2}(OH)_{2}
- IMA symbol: Sew
- Strunz classification: 8.BH.30
- Crystal system: Orthorhombic
- Crystal class: Dipyramidal (mmm); H-M symbol: (2/m 2/m 2/m)
- Space group: Cccm
- Unit cell: a = 16.461 Å, b = 7.434 Å, c = 12.131 Å; Z = 8

Identification
- Formula mass: 464.68 g/mol
- Color: Dark red, lighter red orange
- Crystal habit: Platy aggregates, anhedral grains
- Cleavage: {100} and {011} imperfect
- Fracture: Splintery – thin elongated fractures
- Mohs scale hardness: 3.5
- Luster: Vitreous (glassy)
- Streak: Reddish brown
- Diaphaneity: Translucent
- Specific gravity: 4.16
- Optical properties: Weak Anistropic
- Refractive index: 1.94 calculated
- Birefringence: Weak
- Pleochroism: None

Sewardite is a rare arsenate mineral with formula of CaFe^{3+}_{2}(AsO_{4})_{2}(OH)_{2}. Sewardite was discovered in 1982 and named for the mineralogist, Terry M. Seward (born 1940), a professor of geochemistry in Zürich, Switzerland.

== Properties ==
Sewardite is orthorhombic, which means that it contains three axes of unequal length, a, b, and c, which are all at 90° to one another. Its class structure is mmm (2/m 2/m 2/m) – dipyramidal. Sewardite can form platy-to-compact anhedral-to-subhedral masses up to 0.3 mm in size.

In terms of its optical properties, sewardite is weakly anisotropic, which means the velocity of light varies depending on the direction through the mineral. Its color in plane-polarized light is dark red, and it does not exhibit pleochroism, which means it does not appear to be a different color when observed at different angles under a polarizing petrographic microscope. Sewardite illustrates weak birefringence because it is weakly anisotropic.

== Occurrence ==
Sewardite has only been found at three locations, in the Tsumeb mine in Tsumeb, Namibia, Mina Ojuela, Mapimi, Durango, Mexico, and La Mur, Las Animas mine, Sonora, Mexico. At the site in Durango, Mexico, it occurs as a dark, reddish spherules and rosettes of very thin, flaky crystals.

This newly discovered mineral (confirmed as a species in 1998) has been determined as rare, since only 1–2 mg of it were found in the Tsumeb mine.
