= Allactite =

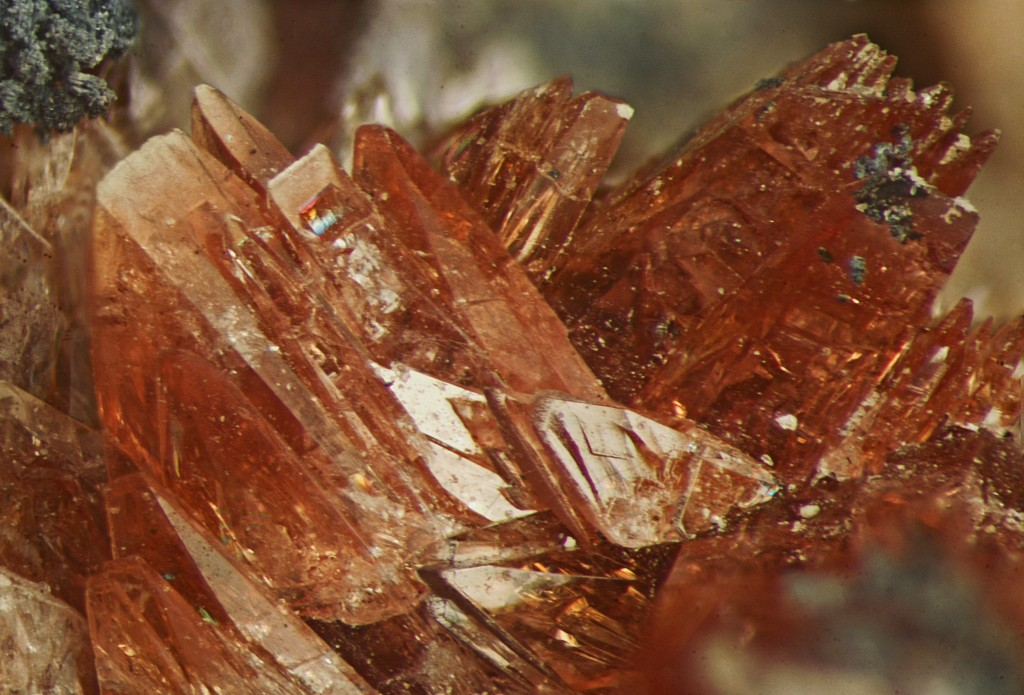
- Picture width 3 mm

General
- Category: Arsenate mineral
- Formula: Mn_{7}(AsO_{4})_{2}(OH)_{8}
- IMA symbol: Ala
- Strunz classification: 8.BE.30
- Dana classification: 41.2.1.1
- Crystal system: Monoclinic
- Crystal class: Prismatic (2/m) (same H-M symbol)
- Space group: P2_{1}/a
- Unit cell: a = 11.03, b = 12.12 c = 5.51 [Å], β = 114°, Z = 2

Identification
- Color: Brown, dark to light purplish red, brownish red, colorless to white
- Crystal habit: Elongated prisms, bladed, tabular, rosette-like aggregates
- Cleavage: Distinct, {001}
- Fracture: Uneven
- Tenacity: Brittle
- Mohs scale hardness: 4.5
- Luster: Vitreous, slightly greasy on fracture surfaces
- Streak: Gray to faint brown
- Specific gravity: 3.83 (meas.), 3.94 (calc.)
- Optical properties: Biaxial (−)
- Refractive index: n_{α} = 1.755–1.761 n_{β} = 1.772–1.786 n_{γ} = 1.774–1.787
- Pleochroism: X = blood-red; Y = pale yellow; Z = sea-green
- 2V angle: ~0°

Allactite is a rare arsenate mineral of metamorphosed manganese zinc ore deposits. It is found in Sweden and New Jersey, US. Its name originated from the Greek αλλάκτειν (allaktein) meaning "to change", referring to the strong pleochroism of the mineral.

== Bibliography ==
- Palache, P.; Berman H.; Frondel, C. (1960). "Dana's System of Mineralogy, Volume II: Halides, Nitrates, Borates, Carbonates, Sulfates, Phosphates, Arsenates, Tungstates, Molybdates, Etc. (Seventh Edition)" John Wiley and Sons, Inc., New York, pp. 785-787.
