= Attikaite =

Arsenate mineral of copper and aluminium

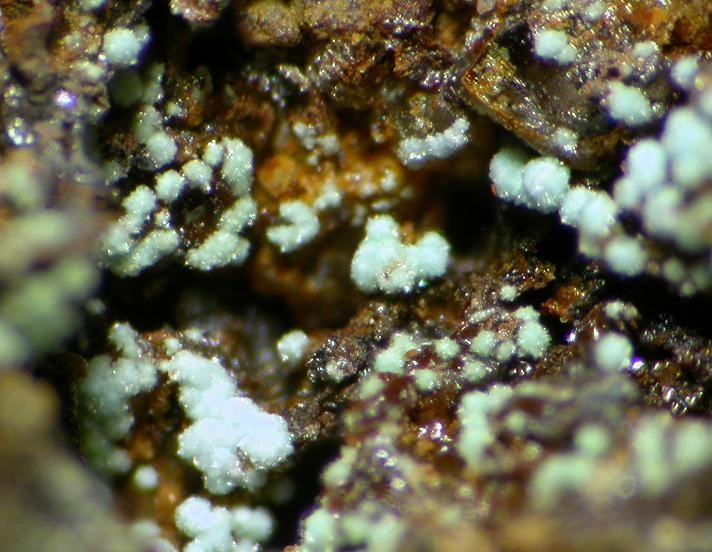
- Attikaite found at its type locality

General
- Category: Minerals
- Formula: Ca_{3}Cu_{2}Al_{2}(AsO_{4})_{4}(OH)_{4}·2H_{2}O
- IMA symbol: Atk

Identification
- Color: light blue, greenish blue
- Specific gravity: 3.2

Attikaite is a copper calcium aluminum arsenate mineral with the chemical formula Ca_{3}Cu_{2}Al_{2}(AsO_{4})_{4}(OH)_{4}·2H_{2}O. It was named after Attica Prefecture, where it was first identified.
