= Cabalzarite =

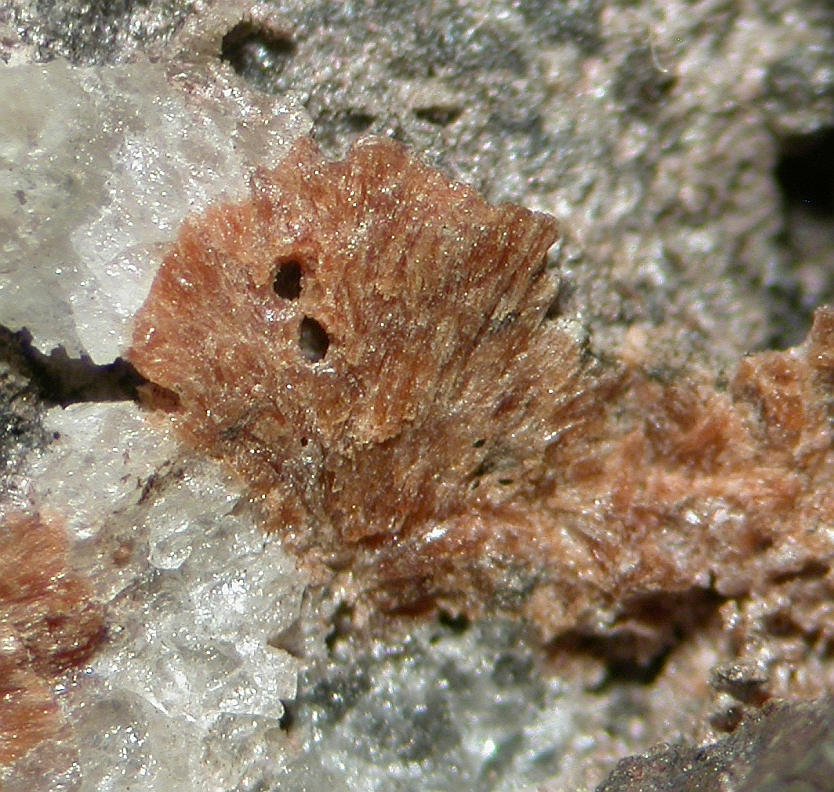
- Cabalzarite found in Switzerland

General
- Category: Arsenate minerals
- Formula: Ca(Mg,Al,Fe^{3+})_{2}[AsO_{4}]_{2}•2(H_{2}O,OH)
- IMA symbol: Clz
- Strunz classification: 8.CG.15
- Crystal system: Monoclinic
- Crystal class: Prismatic (2/m) (same H-M symbol)
- Space group: C2/m
- Unit cell: a = 8.925 Å, b = 6.143 Å, c = 7.352 Å, β = 115.25°; Z = 2

Identification
- Color: Light brown, brownish pink, orange brown
- Crystal habit: Aggregates and clusters, granular
- Fracture: Irregular
- Mohs scale hardness: 5
- Luster: Vitreous
- Streak: White
- Diaphaneity: transparent
- Specific gravity: 3.89
- Optical properties: Biaxial
- Refractive index: n_{α} = 1.700 n_{γ} = 1.760
- Birefringence: δ = 0.060

Cabalzarite is a rare arsenate mineral with the chemical formula Ca(Mg,Al,Fe^{3+})_{2}[AsO_{4}]_{2}•2(H_{2}O,OH). It is a member of the tsumcorite group. It crystallizes in the monoclinic system and typically occurs as clusters of crystals or granular aggregates.

It was first described for samples from an abandoned manganese mine in Falotta, Graubünden, Switzerland and named for Swiss amateur mineralogist Walter Cabalzar. It was approved as a new mineral by the IMA in 1997. It has also been reported from the Aghbar mine in Ouarzazate Province, Morocco.
