= Geigerite =

Mineral

General
- Category: Arsenate minerals
- Formula: Mn_{5}(AsO_{3}OH)_{2}(AsO_{4})_{2}·10H_{2}O
- IMA symbol: Gga
- Strunz classification: 8.CE.05
- Crystal system: Triclinic
- Crystal class: Pinacoidal (1̅) (same H-M symbol)
- Space group: P1̅
- Unit cell: a = 7.94 Å, b = 10.69 Å c = 6.77 Å; α = 80.97° β = 84.2°, γ = 81.85°; Z = 1

Identification
- Formula mass: 1,012.54 g/mol
- Color: Red, colorless
- Crystal habit: Platy, partly triangular crystals to 0.5 mm
- Cleavage: Perfect
- Tenacity: brittle
- Mohs scale hardness: 3
- Luster: Vitreous – pearly
- Streak: White
- Diaphaneity: Transparent to translucent
- Specific gravity: 3.05
- Optical properties: Biaxial (−)
- Refractive index: n_{α} = 1.601 n_{β} = 1.630 n_{γ} = 1.660
- Birefringence: δ = 0.059
- Pleochroism: Very weak, colorless to rose-red
- 2V angle: 89°

Geigerite is a mineral, a complex hydrous manganese arsenate with formula: Mn_{5}(AsO_{3}OH)_{2}(AsO_{4})_{2}·10H_{2}O. It forms triclinic pinacoidal, vitreous, colorless to red to brown crystals. It has a Mohs hardness of 3 and a specific gravity of 3.05.

It was discovered in Grischun, Switzerland in 1989. It was named in honor of Thomas Geiger (1886–1976), Wiesendangen, Switzerland, who studied the Falotta manganese ores.

== Composition ==
The chemical composition of geigerite is hydrous manganese arsenate (Mn_{5}(AsO_{3}OH)_{2}(AsO_{4})_{2}·10H_{2}O). The chemical composition was found by using an electron microprobe in the Falotta mines in Switzerland.

== Geologic occurrence ==
Geigerite can be found in the abandoned manganese mine in Oberhalbstein, Switzerland. It is mainly found in cavities in adiolarites, which are a form of igneous rock that have either a radial or fanlike texture of crystals. Geigerite is then formed by metamorphism of manganese oxide ores. Recently, geigerite has been found in Fukushima Prefecture, Japan. Geigerite has also been found in Mt. Nero Mine, Borghetto Di Vara, La Spieza, Italy.

== Structure ==
Geigerite’s crystal system is triclinic with perfect cleavage on the {010}. The Herman Mauguin symbol for geigerite is 1̅ and its space group is P1̅. Geigerite contains two arsenate ions which are independent of one another. The first is the AsO_{3}OH group, and the second is the AsO_{4}. In the acidic AsO_{3}OH group, the As-O bonds are much shorter than the As-OH bonds. Similarly, in the AsO_{4} group, As-O bonds are also shorter than the As-O bonds. The remaining bonds within both arsenate groups have nearly equal distances. In the ions there are three manganese atoms, these three links to six oxygen atoms to form a normal octahedral formation.

== Special characteristics ==
One interesting structural feature of geigerite is the presence of a complicated network of hydrogen bonds, which exceed the number of the hydrogen atoms. Geigerite is classified under a group of metal copper (II) arsenates called the Lindackerite group. Minerals within this group have a formula where M equals either copper, calcium, manganese, zinc, or cobalt.

== See also ==
- List of minerals named after people
