= Urusovite =

Rare copper aluminium arsenate mineral

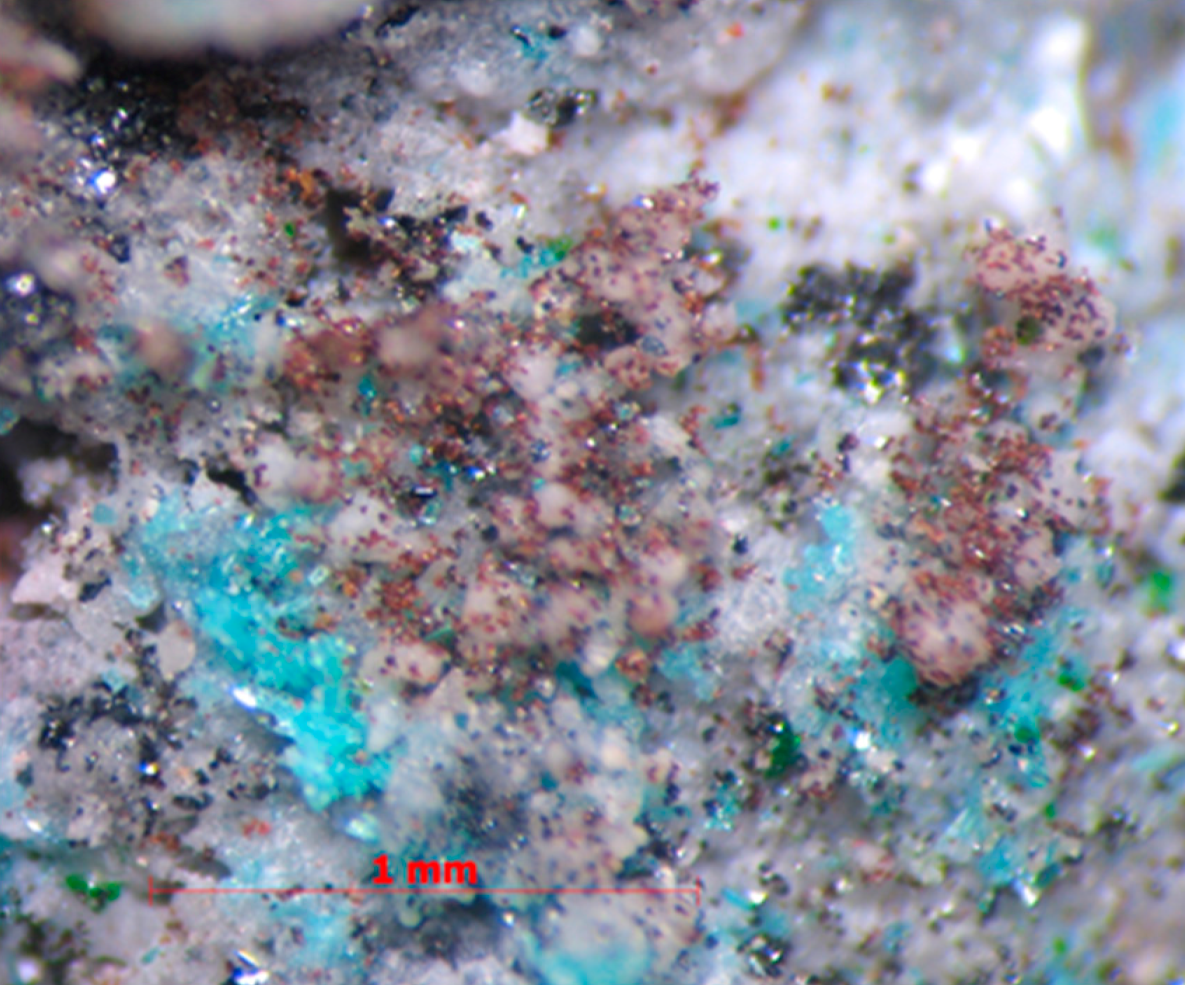
- Numerous small brown crystals of thermaerogenite on colourless to white langbeinite with light blue urusovite, iron-black tenorite and minor green ericlaxmanite

General
- Category: Arsenate mineral
- Formula: CuAlAsO_{5}
- IMA symbol: Uusv
- Strunz classification: 8.BB.60
- Dana classification: 38.05.09.02
- Crystal system: Monoclinic
- Crystal class: Prismatic (2/m) (same H-M symbol)
- Space group: P2_{1}/c
- Unit cell: a = 7.314 Å, b = 10.223 Å c = 5.576 Å; β = 99.79°; Z = 4

Identification
- Color: Light green
- Cleavage: Perfect
- Fracture: Brittle
- Mohs scale hardness: 4
- Luster: Vitreous (glassy)
- Streak: White
- Diaphaneity: Translucent
- Optical properties: Biaxial (−)
- Refractive index: n_{α} = 1.672 n_{β} = 1.718 n_{γ} = 1.722
- Birefringence: δ = 0.050
- Dispersion: r > v strong

Urusovite is a rare copper aluminium arsenate mineral with formula: CuAlAsO_{5}. It is a monoclinic-prismatic light green mineral.

Its type locality and only reported occurrence is in the Novaya fumarole, Second scoria cone, North Breach, Great Fissure eruption, Tolbachik volcano, Kamchatka Oblast', Far-Eastern Region, Russia. It was named after Vadim Sergeevich Urusov, crystal chemist of Moscow State University. It was approved by the International Mineralogical Association in 1998.
