= Bukovskyite =

Arsenate-sulfate mineral

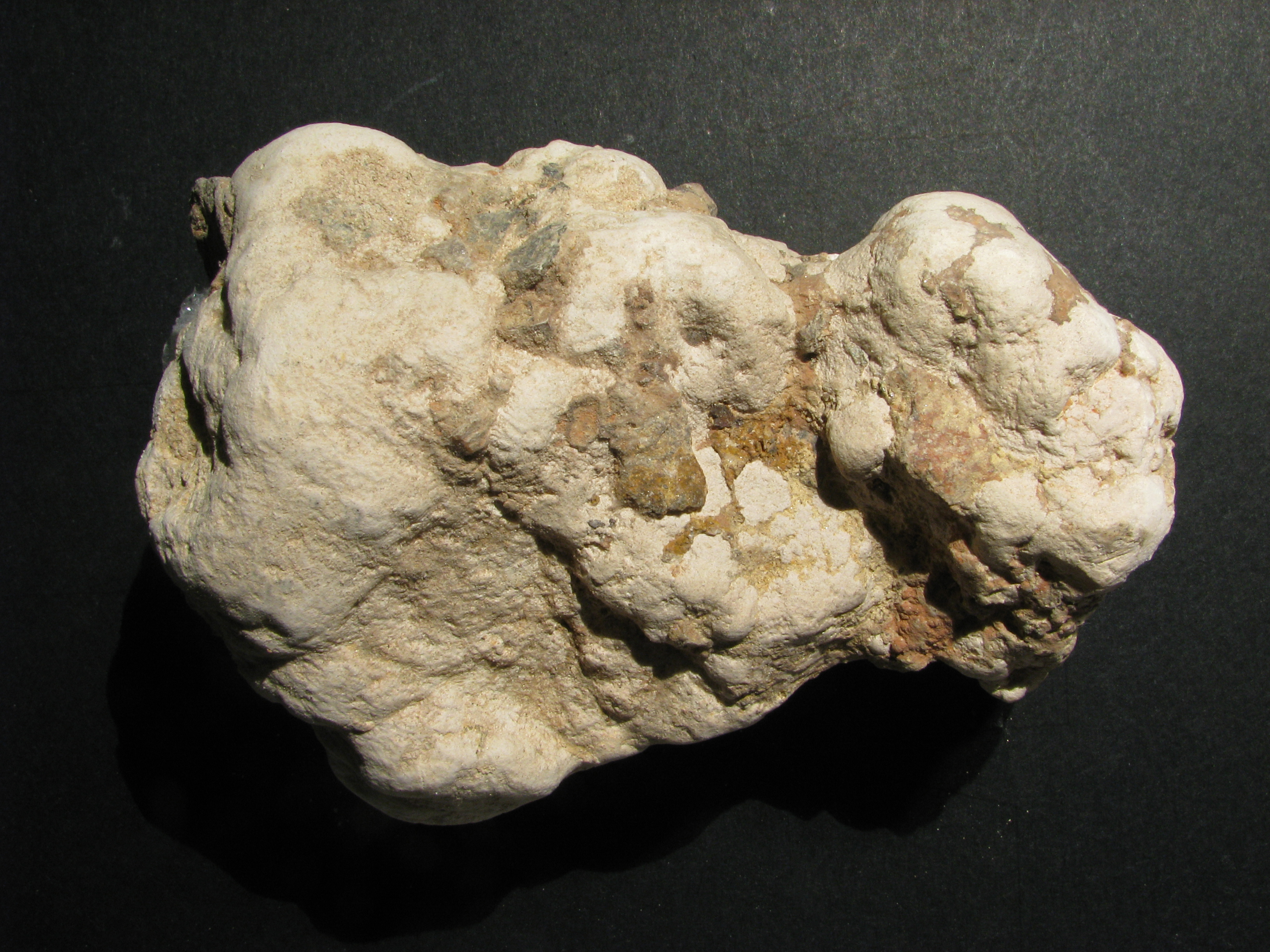
- Botrioidal whitish aggregate

General
- Category: Arsenate minerals
- Formula: Fe_{2}(AsO_{4})(SO_{4})(OH)·7H_{2}O
- IMA symbol: Buk
- Strunz classification: 8.DB.40
- Crystal system: Triclinic; Unknown space group

Bukovskyite (also known as "clay of Kutná Hora") is an iron arsenate sulfate mineral with formula: Fe_{2}(AsO_{4})(SO_{4})(OH)·7H_{2}O which forms nodules with a reniform (kidney-shaped) surface. Under a microscope, these nodules appear as a collection of minute needles similar to gypsum. Some can be seen with the naked eye and occur inside the nodules.

Bukovskyite was first described from pit heaps from the Middle Ages, where sulfate ores had been mined at Kaňk, north of Kutná Hora in Bohemia, Czech Republic, and other old deposits in the vicinity. Only recently defined and acknowledged, it was approved by the IMA in 1969.

Bukovskyite was collected a long time ago from the overgrown pit heaps by the inhabitants of Kutná Hora. It was used for poisoning fieldmice and other field vermin. This poisonous clay, known also by the place name as "clay of Kutná Hora"', was widely known and it was considered to be 'arsenic' (arsenic trioxide). In 1901 Antonín Bukovský (1865–1950), a Czech chemist, who studied minerals of old pit heaps, proved it was an arsenate.
