= Sabelliite =

General
- Category: Arsenate
- Formula: (Cu,Zn)_{2}Zn[(As,Sb)O_{4}](OH)_{3}
- Crystal system: Trigonal
- Crystal class: Basal Pinacoid
- Space group: P3̅
- Unit cell: a=8.201(1), c=7.315(1)Å

Identification
- Color: Emerald green
- Crystal habit: Tabular and cylindrical
- Cleavage: None
- Mohs scale hardness: 4.5
- Luster: Adamantine
- Streak: Light green
- Density: 4.65 g/cm^{3}
- Ultraviolet fluorescence: None

Sabelliite is a mineral that was first discovered at the Is Murvonis Mine in Dosmusnovas, Sardinia. It was discovered growing in an old fluorite mine. It grows as an inter-grown aggregate or as an isolated crystal in a compact quartzitic matrix. It appears as a platy disc-shaped emerald green transparent crystal. The mineral was named after Dr. Cesare Sabelli, researcher at the Consiglio Nazionale delle Ricerche. Sabelliite's ideal chemical formula is (Cu,Zn)_{2}Zn[(As,Sb)O_{4}](OH)_{3}

== Occurrence ==
Sabelliite occurs in quartzitic outcrops as small disc shaped crystals. Formed on foliated aggregates of theisite, which it is most similar to in both physical and chemical properties. Both sabelliite and theisite are believed to be weathering products of sulphides and sulphosalts.

== Physical properties ==
Sabelliite is a transparent emerald green crystal that grows in platy discs. The crystals appear tabular and cylindrical. The diameter of the crystals rarely exceeds 400 μm, but usually consist of crystals with a diameter of 200μm and a height of 15 μm. Sabelliite streaks light green and has a Mohs hardness of about 4.5. The crystals are brittle with no cleavage. Sabelliite has a calculated density of 4.65 g/cm³.

== Optical properties ==
Sabelliite is a transparent mineral with an adamantine luster, or clear transparent look to it. It appears to not be fluorescent under long- or short- waved ultraviolet radiation. Sabelliite is optically nonpleochroic, uniaxial negative. Nonpleochroic means that the mineral does not appear as a different color when rotated under a microscope, while uniaxial negative means it has a single optic axis, meaning that under a microscope when rotated the light will get refracted and experience extinction.

== Chemical structure ==
No other elements were found to be associated with sabelliite besides the ones listed in the chemical composition. The empirical formula that was derived from calculations is Cu_{2.19}Zn_{0.96}(As_{0.80}Sb_{0.16}Si_{0.05})_{Σ1.01}O_{4.31}(OH)_{2.69}. The crystal structure refinement shows that the Zn atoms are both octahedrally and tetrahedrally coordinated.

== Chemical composition ==
Atomic wt. % with ranges
Cu	34.80	32.44-37.26%
Zn	15.65	13.91-17.34%
Si	0.33	0.19-0.49%
As	15.04	13.42-16.32%
Sb	4.96	4.10-6.15%
O	28.00	26.94-29.20%
	---	
	98.78	
H	0.67	
	---	
Total	99.45	

== X-ray crystallography ==
X-ray crystallography shows that Sabelliite is a trigonal crystal, and that the crystal structure is P3̅. The data was obtained using a Gandolfi camera with a Ni-filtered CuKα radiation. The dimensions that were calculated using the X-ray diffraction are, a = 8.201(1), b = a, c = 7.315(1) Å. Volume is 426.07(9) Å³. However, the structure determination may have some "inconsistencies."

== See also ==
- List of minerals
