= Tokyoite =

Barium manganese vanadate mineral

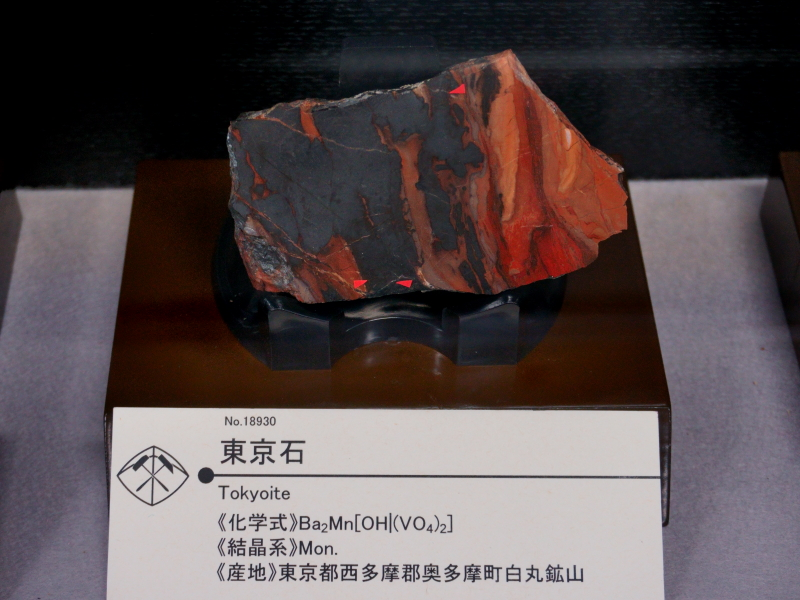
- Tokyoite ore displayed at the Mining Museum of Akita University, Japan

General
- Category: Vanadate mineral
- Formula: Ba_{2}(Mn^{3+},Fe^{3+})OH(VO_{4})_{2}
- IMA symbol: Tky
- Strunz classification: 8.BG.05
- Crystal system: Monoclinic
- Crystal class: Prismatic (2/m) (same H-M symbol)
- Unit cell: a = 9.104 Å, b = 6.132 Å c = 7.895 Å; β = 112.2°; Z = 2

Identification
- Color: Reddish black
- Crystal habit: Occurs as splotchy, anhedral crystals forming inclusions
- Cleavage: None observed
- Mohs scale hardness: 4.5 - 5
- Luster: Vitreous
- Streak: Deep brownish red
- Diaphaneity: Translucent
- Specific gravity: 4.62 calculated
- Optical properties: Biaxial (?)
- Refractive index: a=1.99, g=2.03
- Birefringence: 0.0400
- Pleochroism: Distinct, reddish orange to dark brownish red

Tokyoite is a rare barium manganese vanadate mineral with the chemical formula: Ba_{2}(Mn^{3+},Fe^{3+})OH(VO_{4})_{2}. It is the manganese analogue of the iron rich gamagarite and the barium analogue of the lead vanadate, brackebuschite.

It occurs in low-grade metamorphosed sedimentary manganese ore deposits associated with hyalophane, braunite and tamaite.

It was first reported for an occurrence in the Shiromaru Mine, Okutama, Tama district, Tokyo Prefecture, Kantō region, Honshu Island, Japan and approved by the IMA in 2003. It has been found in two mines in Italy and one in Japan, for which it was named.
