= Aerugite =

Nickel arsenate mineral

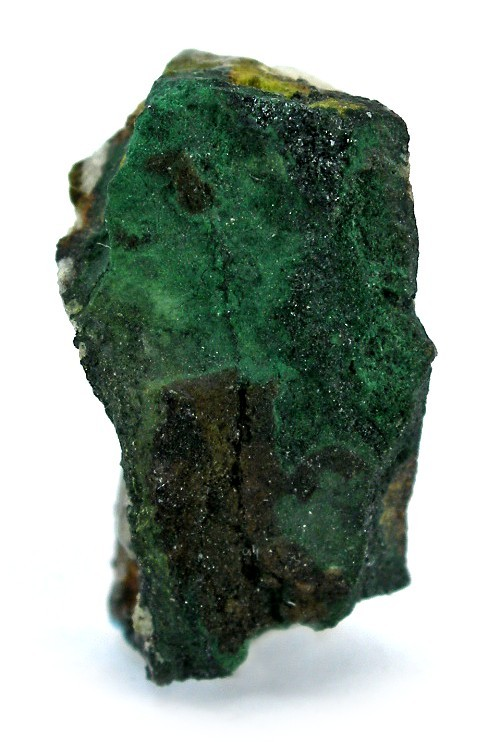

General
- Category: Arsenate minerals
- Formula: Ni_{9}(AsO_{4})_{2}AsO_{6}
- IMA symbol: Aru
- Strunz classification: 8.BC.15
- Crystal system: Trigonal
- Crystal class: Hexagonal scalenohedral (3̅m); H-M symbol: (3̅ 2/m)
- Space group: R3̅m

Identification
- Color: Grass green, blue-green
- Crystal habit: Massive to crystalline crusts
- Mohs scale hardness: 4
- Luster: Adamantine
- Streak: light green, greenish white
- Diaphaneity: Opaque to semitransparent
- Specific gravity: 5.85–5.95

Aerugite is a rare complex nickel arsenate mineral with a variably reported formula: Ni_{9}(AsO_{4})_{2}AsO_{6}. It forms green to deep blue-green trigonal crystals. It has a Mohs hardness of 4 and a specific gravity of 5.85 to 5.95.

It was first described in 1858 in either the South Terres mine of Cornwall, England or in the Ore Mountains, Saxony, Germany. The origin is disputed. The most common occurrence is as an incrustation on furnace walls in which ores are roasted. Its name comes from the Latin word aerugo for copper rust.

== See also ==
- List of minerals
