= Parascorodite =

General
- Category: Secondary Iron Arsenate
- Formula: FeAsO_{4}·2H_{2}O
- IMA symbol: Pscd
- Crystal system: Hexagonal
- Crystal class: 6/mmm (6/m 2/m 2/m) - Dihexagonal Dipyramidal
- Unit cell: $a_1,a_2$ = 8.9327(5)Å, $c$ = 9.9391(8)Å, $V$ = 686.83(8)Å^{3}

Identification
- Color: yellow-white, green-grey, white
- Crystal habit: irregular or fan-like aggregates, crystals are prismatic or thin flakes
- Tenacity: sectile
- Mohs scale hardness: 1-2
- Luster: earthy or vitreous
- Streak: yellow-white
- Specific gravity: 3.358
- Solubility: soluble in HCl

Parascorodite is a rare, secondary iron-arsenate mineral. It has a chemical formula of (FeAsO_{4}·2H_{2}O) and was discovered in 1967 using X-ray powder diffraction methods, when an unknown substance was found along with scorodite on medieval ore dumps in the Czech Republic. The holotype of parascorodite can be found in the mineralogical collection of the National Museum, Prague, Czech Republic under acquisition number P1p25/98.

== Occurrence ==
Parascorodite occurs at the Kank mine in the Kutna Hora ore district in Central Bohemia, Czech Republic . It is one of the rarest secondary minerals. Parascorodite is found in medieval ore dumps, that were most likely used for silver and polymetallic ore waste. The dumps contain arsenic rich ore, which in medieval times was considered waste.

== Paragenesis ==
The medieval ore dumps are heavily weathered, but it is assumed that parascorodite, along with other secondary iron arsenates and arsenosulfates, actually formed much before the dumping of waste material on this area by natural weathering processes. Parascorodite formed as a product of arsenopyrite dissolution, followed by recrystallization of iron-arsenic bearing solutions, in near surface weathering conditions. Parascorodite is dimorphous with scorodite, and is also associated with pitticite, gypsum, jarosite, and amorphous ferric hydroxides.

== Physical properties ==
Parascorodite occurs in aggregates of somewhat hemispherical shapes. The aggregates grow to be about 2 cm across, consisting of extremely small crystals that can be arranged in fan-like or irregular masses. Parascorodite is cryptocrystalline, and has a luster that can vary from earthy to vitreous. It is a soft mineral, falling between 1 and 2 on the Mohs hardness scale. Aggregates can be white to yellowish, or more rarely green-grey in color, and have a yellow-white streak. The measured density of earthy aggregates in ethyl alcohol is 3.212 g/cm^{3}. The rare green-grey variety of parascorodite aggregates may exhibit conchoidal fracture.

Individual crystal size varies between 0.1 μm and 0.5 μm, with some twinned crystals measuring 1.0 μm. Crystals occur as either prisms or thin flakes with a hexagonal outline.

Parascorodite dissolves slowly in 10% hydrochloric acid (HCl). In water, it will disintegrate rapidly into a powder. Under hydrothermal conditions parascorodite can re-crystallize back to scorodite.

== Chemical composition ==
The chemical composition of parascorodite was determined using qualitative spectral analysis. Two major elements were indicated: iron and arsenic. Quantitative analysis was also determined using two wet chemical analyses (results in the table below).

Oxide	wt%
As_{2}O_{5}	44.45
P_{2}O_{5}	0.84
SO_{3}	1.53
Fe_{2}O_{3}	34.55
Al_{2}O_{3}	0.17
H_{2}O^{+}	16.81
H_{2}O^{−}	0.13
Total	99.95

== Crystallography ==
=== X-ray diffraction ===
The crystal structure of parascorodite was determined using X-ray powder diffraction. Using the X-ray diffraction data (in the table below), the parascorodite unit cell was determined as hexagonal or trigonal. The unit cell parameters are $a_1,a_2$ = 8.9327(5)Å, $c$ = 9.9391(8)Å, with a cell volume of $V$ = 686.83(8)Å^{3}.

d-spacing	intensity
4.973 Å	61
4.184 Å	44
4.076 Å	100
3.053 Å	67
2.806 Å	68
2.661 Å	59
2.520 Å	54
