= Kaatialaite =

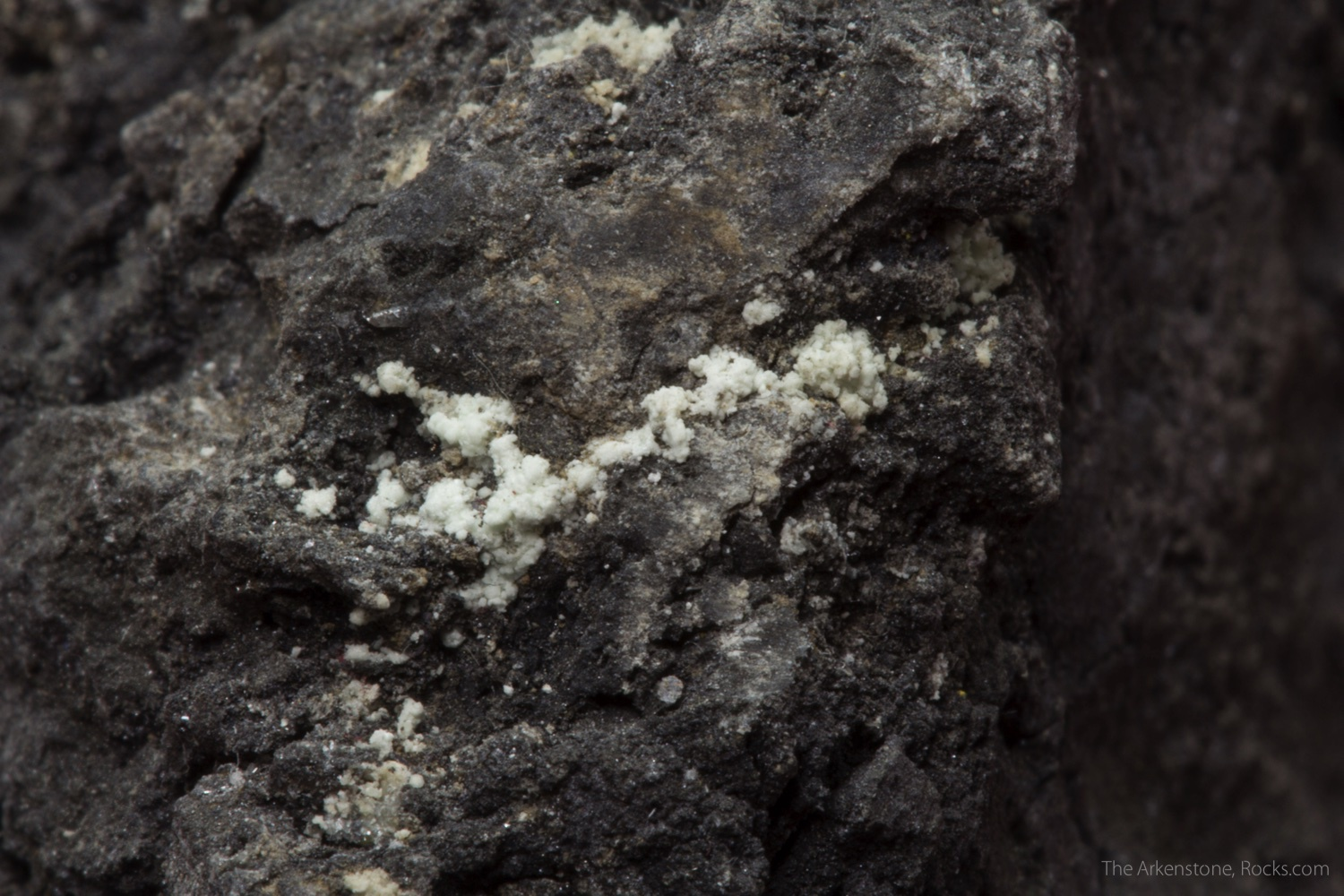
- Kaatialaite found in the Czech Republic

General
- Category: Arsenate mineral
- Formula: Fe(H_{2}AsO_{4})_{3}·5H_{2}O
- IMA symbol: Kaa
- Strunz classification: 8.CC.10
- Crystal system: Monoclinic
- Space group: P2_{1}/n (no. 14)

Identification
- Color: Greenish blue, gray, yellow, white
- Streak: White
- Diaphaneity: Transparent

Kaatialaite (Fe(H_{2}AsO_{4})_{3}·5H_{2}O) is a ferric arsenate mineral found in Finland.
