= Alvanite =

Mineral

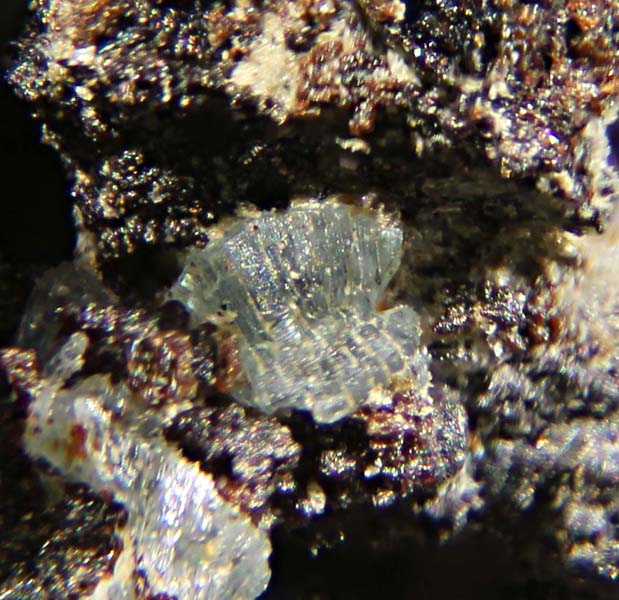
- Alvanite found at its type locality

General
- Category: Minerals
- Formula: (Zn,Ni)Al_{4}(V^{5+}O_{3})_{2}(OH)_{12}·2H_{2}O
- IMA symbol: Alv

Identification
- Color: Pale bluish green to bluish black
- Fracture: Micaceous
- Mohs scale hardness: 3-3.5
- Luster: Vitreous, Pearly
- Streak: White
- Diaphaneity: Translucent
- Specific gravity: 2.49

Alvanite (IMA symbol: Alv) is a zinc nickel aluminium vanadate mineral with the chemical formula (Zn,Ni)Al_{4}(V^{5+}O_{3})_{2}(OH)_{12}·2H_{2}O. It was originally discovered in the Karatau Mountains.
