= Zykaite =

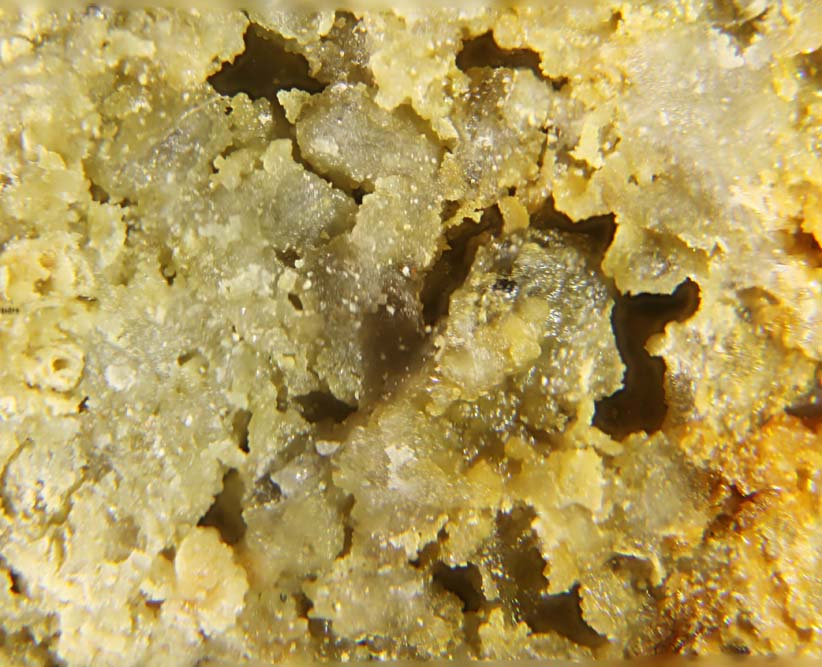
- Zykaite found in the Czech Republic

General
- Category: Minerals
- Formula: Fe^{3+}_{4}(AsO_{4})_{3}(SO_{4})(OH)·15(H_{2}O)

Identification
- Color: Grey-white, Yellow-white, Green-white
- Fracture: Irregular, Uneven
- Tenacity: Waxy
- Mohs scale hardness: 2
- Luster: Dull
- Streak: Pale yellow
- Diaphaneity: Translucent
- Specific gravity: 2.5
- Density: 2.50 g/cm^{3}

Zykaite or zýkaite is a grey-white mineral consisting of arsenic, hydrogen, iron, sulfur and oxygen with formula: Fe^{3+}_{4}(AsO_{4})_{3}(SO_{4})(OH)·15(H_{2}O). This dull mineral is very soft with a Mohs hardness of only 2 and a specific gravity of 2.5. It is translucent and crystallizes in the orthorhombic crystal system.

It is in the Sanjuanite-Destinezite mineral group, containing group members Destinezite, Sanjuanite, and Sarmientite.

Its common associates include limonite, gypsum, scorodite, quartz and arsenopyrite. It is found in the Czech Republic, New Zealand, Poland and Germany.

Zykaite was first described in 1978 for an occurrence in the Safary mine, Kutná Hora, Bohemia, Czech Republic and named in honour of Vaclav Zyka (born 1926), a Czech geochemist.
