= Haidingerite =

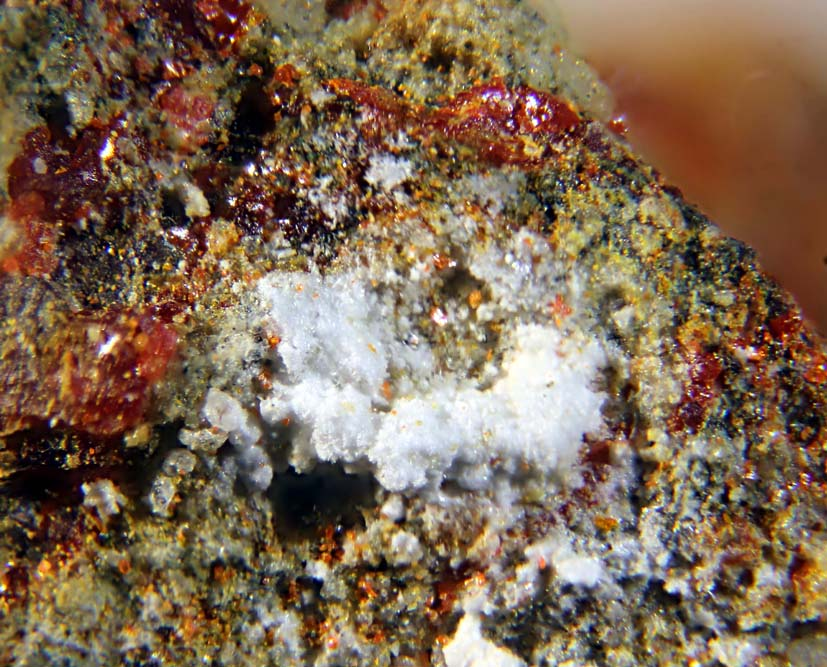
- White crystals of haidingerite associated with yellow orpiment and red realgar from the White Caps Mine, Manhattan District, Nevada, United States

General
- Category: Minerals
- Formula: Ca(AsO_{3}OH)·H_{2}O

Identification
- Mohs scale hardness: 2 – 2.5
- Specific gravity: 2.95

Haidingerite is a calcium arsenate mineral with formula Ca(AsO_{3}OH)·H_{2}O. It crystallizes in the orthorhombic crystal system as short prismatic to equant crystals. It typically occurs as scaly, botryoidal or fibrous coatings. It is soft, Mohs hardness of 2 to 2.5, and has a specific gravity of 2.95. It has refractive indices of nα = 1.590, nβ = 1.602 and nγ = 1.638.

It was originally discovered in 1827 in Jáchymov, Czech Republic. It was named to honor Austrian mineralogist Wilhelm Karl Ritter von Haidinger (1795–1871). It occurs as a dehydration product of pharmacolite in the Getchell Mine, Nevada.

== See also ==
- List of minerals named after people
