= Type specimen (mineralogy) =

Reference sample by which a mineral is defined

In mineralogy, the type specimen, also known as type material, is a reference sample by which a mineral is defined. Similar to the biology type methods, a mineral type specimen is a sample (or in some cases a group of samples) of a mineral to which the scientific name of that mineral is formally attached. In other words, a type specimen is an example that serves to anchor or centralize the defining features of that particular mineral.

A mineral is a scientifically named set that includes some materials and excludes others, based on a detailed published description and on the provision of type specimens, which are usually available to scientists for examination in a major museum research collection, or similar institution.

== History ==
Whereas the system of type specimens has long-existed in the biological sciences, this is not the case in mineralogy. The recentness of the practice means that sometimes no type material exists, even for minerals discovered as recently as the twentieth century. The publication of "Type specimens in mineralogy" by P.G. Embrey and M.H. Hey in 1970 stimulated much discussion on type specimens, leading to formal definitions approved by the IMA in 1987.

Nowadays, deposition of the type material in a professionally curated museum is required by the Commission on New Minerals, Nomenclature and Classification of the IMA when approving a new mineral species.

== Types ==
The following definitions for kinds of type specimens were approved in 1987 by the Commission on New Minerals and Mineral Names and the Commission on Museums of the International Mineralogical Association (IMA). These definitions are primarily separated by the number of specimens necessary for definition of a mineral type.

Holotype

A holotype is a single specimen from which the original description of the mineral can be determined in whole. In plain English, a single object that can be used to completely define a mineral type.

Cotype

Cotypes are multiple specimens from which quantitative, but not necessary, data are obtained for the original mineral description. In plain English, multiple objects are necessary to define the mineral type.

Neotype

A neotype is a new specimen for the redefinition or reexamination of a mineral when the holotype or cotypes cannot be located or, upon examination, are inadequate for study. These type specimens are valuable when a mineral species is reevaluated because the original description of a mineral may be incomplete or contain errors. In plain English, a mineral that already possessed what was believed to be a sufficient definition, that is then subject to reexamination because of the discover of a new specimen. In some cases, this may be because the original specimens were lost.

== Bibliography ==
- Dunn, Pete J.; Mandarino, Joseph A. (November–December 1987). "Formal definitions of type mineral specimens" (PDF). American Mineralogist. 72 (11 & 12): 1269–1270.
- Nickel, Ernest H.; Grice, Joel D. (1998). "The IMA Commission on New Minerals and Mineral Names: Procedure and Guidelines on Mineral Nomenclature, 1998" (PDF). The Canadian Mineralogist. 36 (1–4): 237. Bibcode:1998MinPe..64..237N. doi:10.1007/BF01226571. S2CID 10576420.
