= Picropharmacolite =

Rare arsenate mineral

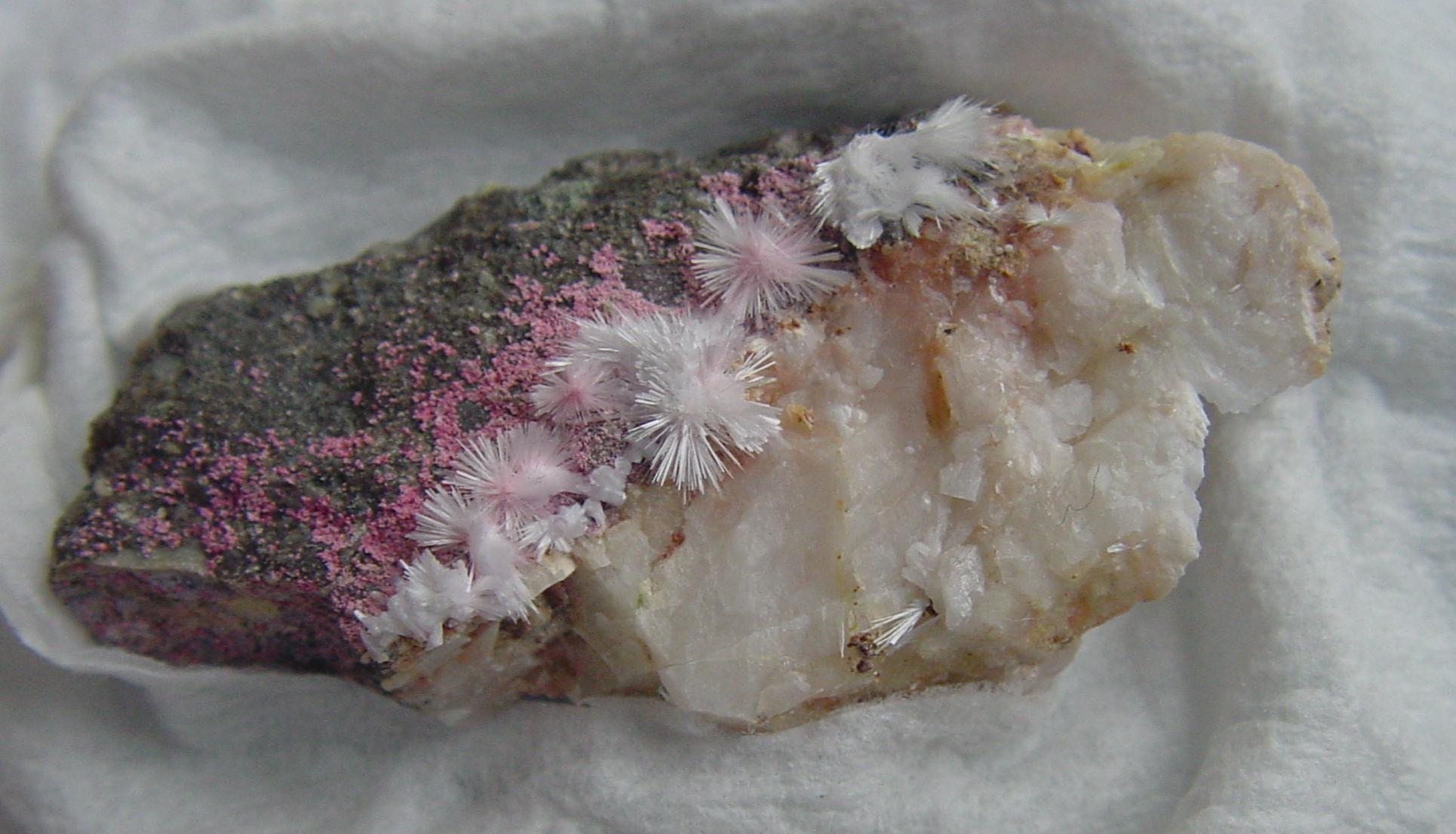
- Picropharmacolite with guerinite and erythrite from Bauhaus, Hesse, Germany. Specimen size 5.5 cm

General
- Category: Arsenate mineral
- Formula: Ca_{4}Mg(AsO_{3}OH)_{2}(AsO_{4})_{2}·11H_{2}O
- IMA symbol: Ppm
- Strunz classification: 8.CH.15
- Dana classification: 39.2.4.1
- Crystal system: Triclinic
- Crystal class: Pinacoidal (1̅) (same H-M symbol)
- Space group: P1̅
- Unit cell: a = 13.547 Å, b = 13.5 Å, c = 6.71 Å; α = 99.85°, β = 96.41°, γ = 91.6°; Z = 2

Identification
- Formula mass: 940.48 g/mol
- Color: White or colorless
- Crystal habit: As prismatic crystals more typically in radial aggregates, globular crusts, and fibrous concretions
- Twinning: None reported
- Cleavage: Perfect on {100} and {010}
- Fracture: Micaceous
- Tenacity: Fragile
- Mohs scale hardness: 1 to 2
- Luster: Silky, slightly pearly
- Streak: White
- Diaphaneity: Translucent to opaque
- Specific gravity: 2.58 – 2.60
- Optical properties: Biaxial (+)
- Refractive index: n_{α} = 1.631, n_{β} = 1.632, n_{γ} = 1.640 or n_{α} = 1.557, n_{β} = 1.566 – 1.571, n_{γ} = 1.577 – 1.579
- Birefringence: δ = 0.009
- 2V angle: 40° – 50°
- Dispersion: r < v strong
- Other characteristics: Fluorescent blue-white under long wave and short wave ultraviolet light

Picropharmacolite, Ca_{4}Mg(AsO_{3}OH)_{2}(AsO_{4})_{2}·11H_{2}O, is a rare arsenate mineral. It was named in 1819 from the Greek for bitter, in allusion to its magnesium content, and its chemical similarity to pharmacolite. The mineral irhtemite, Ca_{4}Mg(AsO_{3}OH)2(AsO_{4})_{2}·4H_{2}O, has the same composition as picropharmacolite, except that it has only four water molecules per formula unit, instead of eleven. It may be formed by the dehydration of picropharmacolite.

== Structure ==
Infrared spectra show that picropharmacolite contains water molecules H_{2}O, hydroxyl groups (OH)^{−} co-ordinated with Mg^{2+} cations, and acid arsenate radicals (HAsO_{4})^{2−}. There are strong structural similarities with guerinite, Ca_{5}(AsO_{3}OH)_{2}(AsO_{4})_{2}.9H_{2}O which indicates a similar formula for the two minerals.
X-ray diffraction methods indicate that As, Ca and Mg cations are positioned in corrugated layers parallel to the c axis, the layers being linked by hydrogen bonding only. Four independent water molecules are sandwiched between adjacent layers, and build up hydrogen-bonded chains which are also parallel to the c axis. The ratio of four Ca to one Mg remains fairly steady, and no significant Ca/Mg substitution occurs in any cation site. Hence if the formula of picropharmacolite is written as Ca_{4}Mg(H_{2}O)_{7}(AsO_{3}OH)_{2}(AsO_{4})_{2}.4H_{2}O, it is a better representation of the structure than the more usual formula Ca_{4}Mg(AsO_{3}OH)_{2}(AsO_{4})_{2}.11H_{2}O.

== Morphology ==
Picropharmacolite is usually found as small to microscopic pearly white botryoidal aggregates with a radiating foliated structure internally. Less commonly it occurs as silky fibrous aggregates or minute needle-like crystals, that are rectangular prisms elongated along the c axis.

== Environment ==
Formed as an oxidation product of arsenic-bearing sulfides in reaction with surrounding calcium-bearing rocks, and as a recent efflorescence in mine workings. Erythrite and pharmacolite are common associated minerals.

== Type locality ==
It was first described for samples from ore dumps of the Richelsdorf Smelter, Süss, Richelsdorf District, Hesse, Germany. The type material is stored at the National School of Mines, Paris, France, 95.497.
