= Pharmacolite =

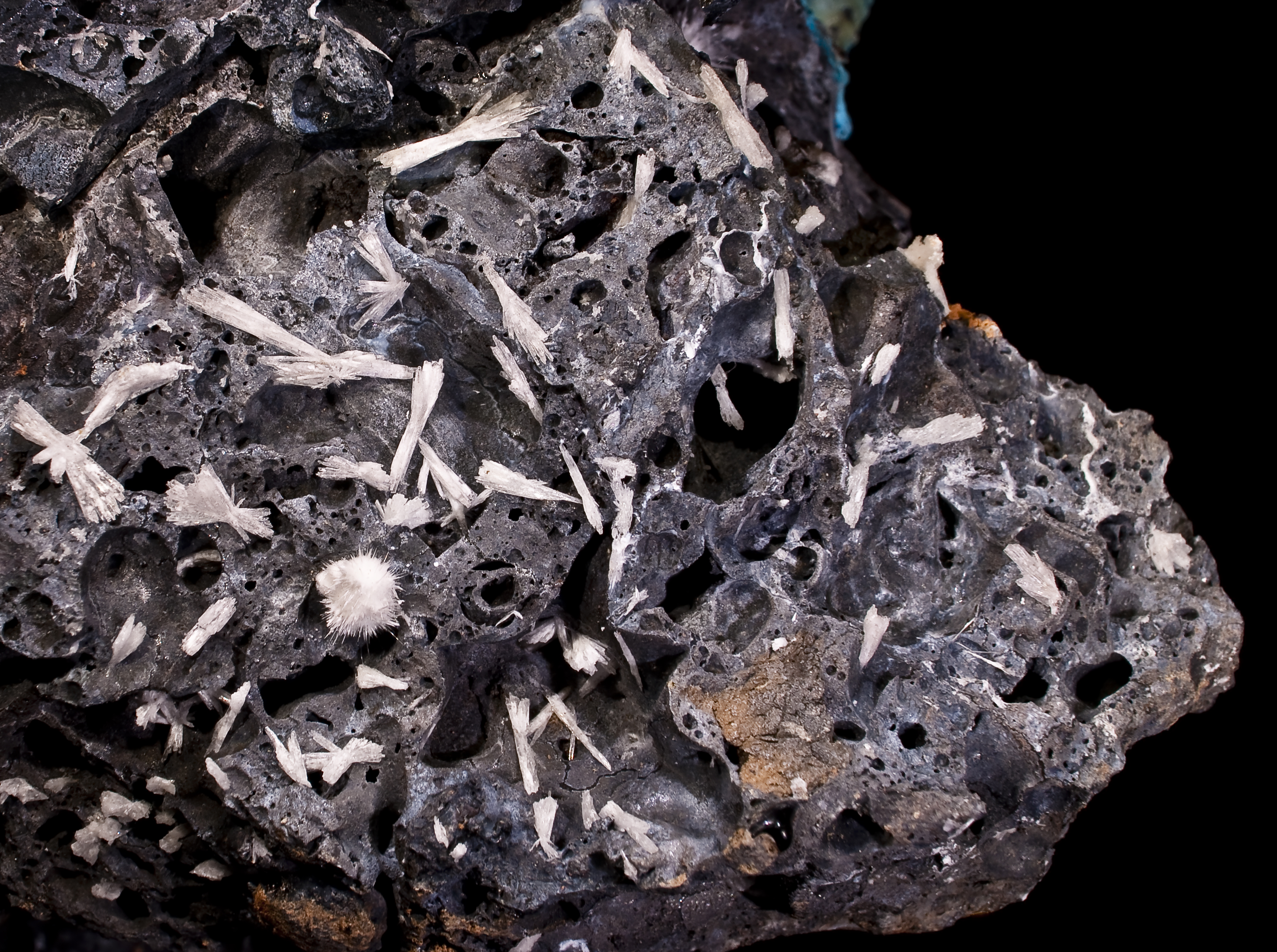
- Pharmacolite on slag from Villanière, Aude, Languedoc-Roussillon, France (View 7.8 cm)

General
- Category: Arsenate mineral
- Formula: CaHAsO_{4}·2(H_{2}O)
- IMA symbol: Pmc
- Strunz classification: 8.CJ.50
- Dana classification: 39.1.1.2
- Crystal system: Monoclinic
- Crystal class: Domatic (m) (same H-M symbol)
- Space group: Ia
- Unit cell: a = 5.959 Å, b = 15.313 Å, c = 6.357 Å; β = 114.67°; Z = 4

Identification
- Color: Colorless, white, pale gray
- Crystal habit: Commonly acicular, silky fibrous, botryoidal to stalactitic; rare as elongated flattened crystals
- Cleavage: Perfect on {010}
- Fracture: Uneven
- Tenacity: Flexible
- Mohs scale hardness: 2 – 2.5
- Luster: Vitreous, pearly on cleavages
- Diaphaneity: Transparent to translucent
- Specific gravity: 2.53 – 2.725
- Optical properties: Biaxial (−)
- Refractive index: nα = 1.580 – 1.583 nβ = 1.589 – 1.590 nγ = 1.590 – 1.594
- Birefringence: δ = 0.010 – 0.011
- Pleochroism: Not pleochroic
- 2V angle: Measured: 77°

Pharmacolite is an uncommon calcium arsenate mineral with formula CaHAsO_{4}·2(H_{2}O). It occurs as soft, white clusters of fibrous crystals and encrustations which crystallize in the monoclinic system. It is the arsenate analogue of the sulfate gypsum and the phosphate brushite.

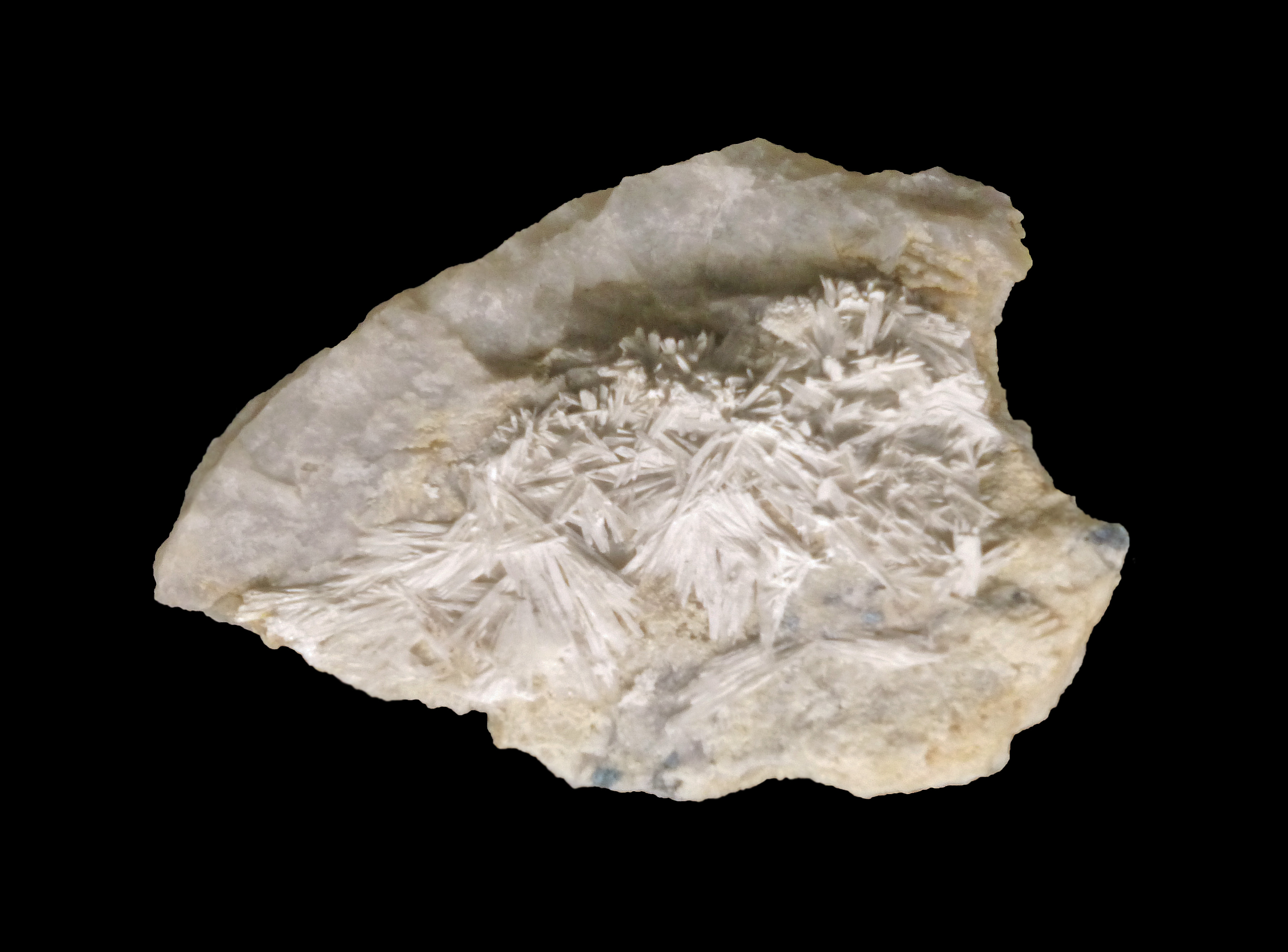
Pharmacolite from Sainte-Marie-aux-Mines

== Discovery and occurrence ==
Pharmacolite was first described in 1800 for an occurrence in the Sophia Mine in the Böckelsbach Valley of Wittichen, Schenkenzell, Black Forest, Baden-Württemberg, Germany. The name is from the Greek φάρμακον ("pharmakon"), alluding to its poisonous arsenic content.

It forms by secondary (oxidizing) processes from primary arsenic minerals. It is associated with picropharmacolite, hornesite, haidingerite and rosslerite.
