= List of minerals recognized by the International Mineralogical Association (B) =

This list includes those recognised minerals beginning with the letter B. The International Mineralogical Association is the international group that recognises new minerals and new mineral names; however, minerals discovered before 1959 did not go through the official naming procedure, although some minerals published previously have been either confirmed or discredited since that date. This list contains a mixture of mineral names that have been approved since 1959 and those mineral names believed to still refer to valid mineral species (these are called "grandfathered" species).

The list is divided into groups:

- Introduction • (Main synonyms)
- A • B • C • D • E • F • G • H • I • J • K • L • M • N • O • P–Q • R • S • T • U–V • W–X • Y–Z

The data was exported from mindat.org on 29 April 2005; updated up to 'IMA2021'.

The minerals are sorted by name, followed by the structural group (rruff.info/ima and ima-cnmnc by mineralienatlas.de, mainly) or chemical class (mindat.org and basics), the year of publication (if it's before of an IMA approval procedure), the IMA approval and the Strunz-mindat code. The first link is to mindat.org, the second link is to webmineral.com, and the third is to the Handbook of Mineralogy (Mineralogical Society of America).

- Abbreviations:
  - ^{D} – discredited (IMA/CNMNC status).
  - ^{Q} – questionable/ doubtful (IMA/CNMNC, mindat.org or mineralienatlas.de status).
  - ^{N} – published without approval of the IMA/CNMNC, or just not an IMA approved mineral but with some acceptance in the scientific community nowadays.
  - ^{I} – intermediate member of a solid-solution series.
  - ^{H} – hypothetical mineral (synthetic, anthropogenic, suspended approval procedure, etc.)
    - ^{ch} – incomplete description, hypothetical solid solution end member.
  - Rd – redefinition of ...
  - "s.p." – special procedure.
  - group – a name used to designate a group of species, sometimes only a mineral group name.
  - no – no link available.
  - IUPAC – chemical name.
  - Y: NNNN – year of publication.
  - Y: old – known before publications were available.

== B ==
=== Ba ===
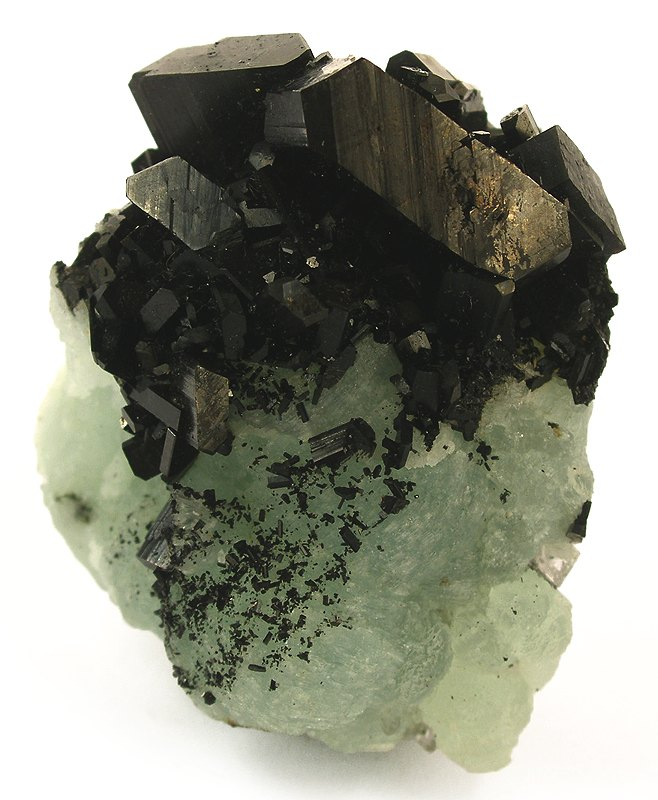
Babingtonite on prehnite, Sichuan Province, China, size: 5.3 × 3.6 × 2.4 cm

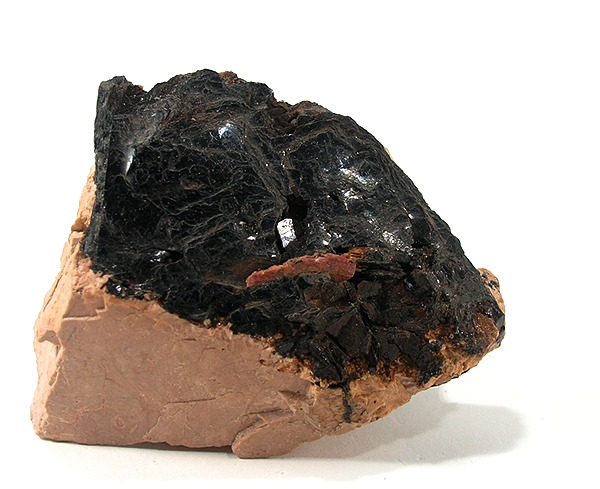
Bannisterite on feldspar matrix, Broken Hill, New South Wales 9.7 × 5.2 × 4.5 cm

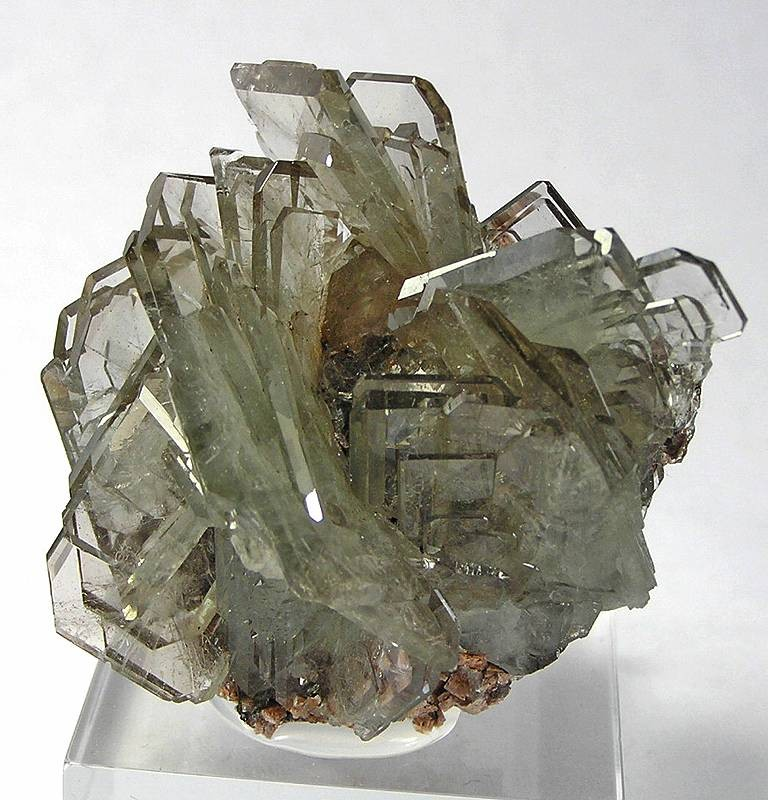
Barite, Cerro Warihuyn (Huarihuyn), Miraflores, Huamalíes Province, Huánuco Department, Peru

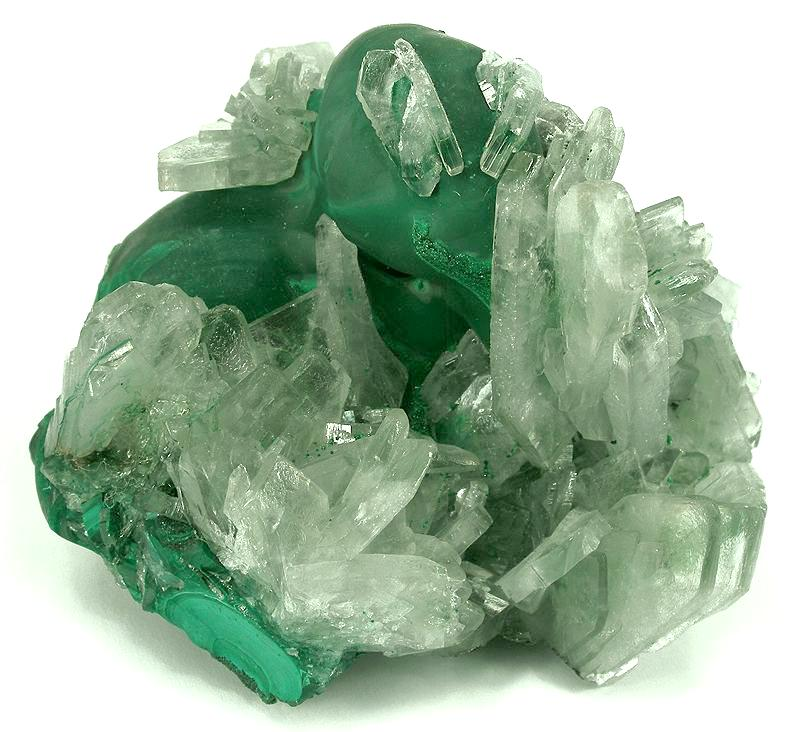
Barite on malachite

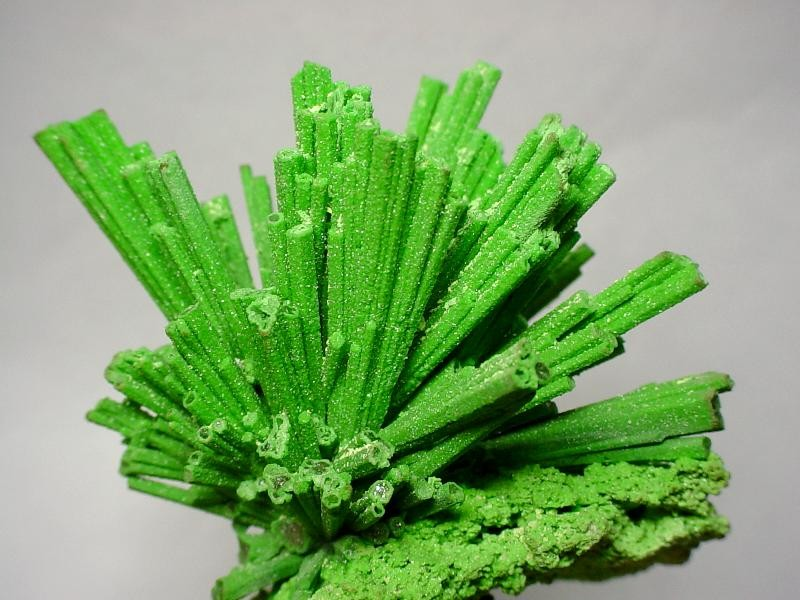
Bayldonite, Tsumeb, Namibia

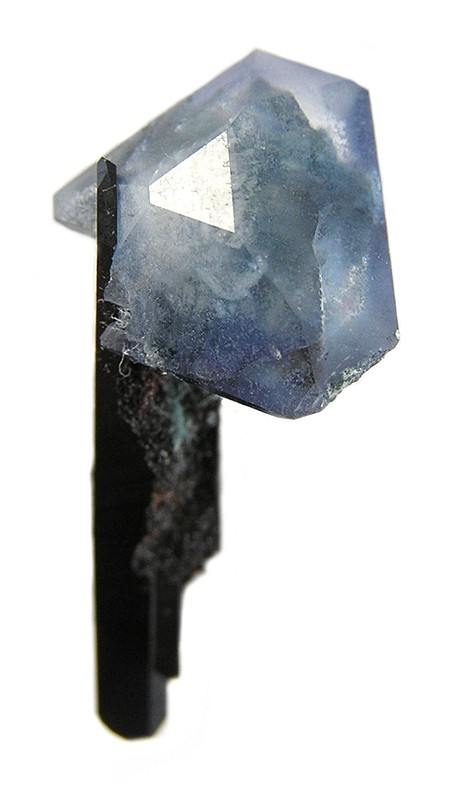
Benitoite on neptunite, Dallas Gem Mine, San Benito County, California, US, 2.9 x 1.4 x 1.0 cm

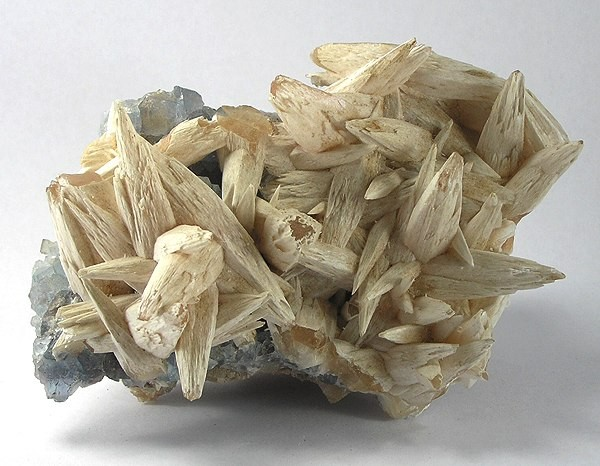
Spiky calcite scalenohedra with a coating of whitish benstonite on a layer of teal-colored fluorite

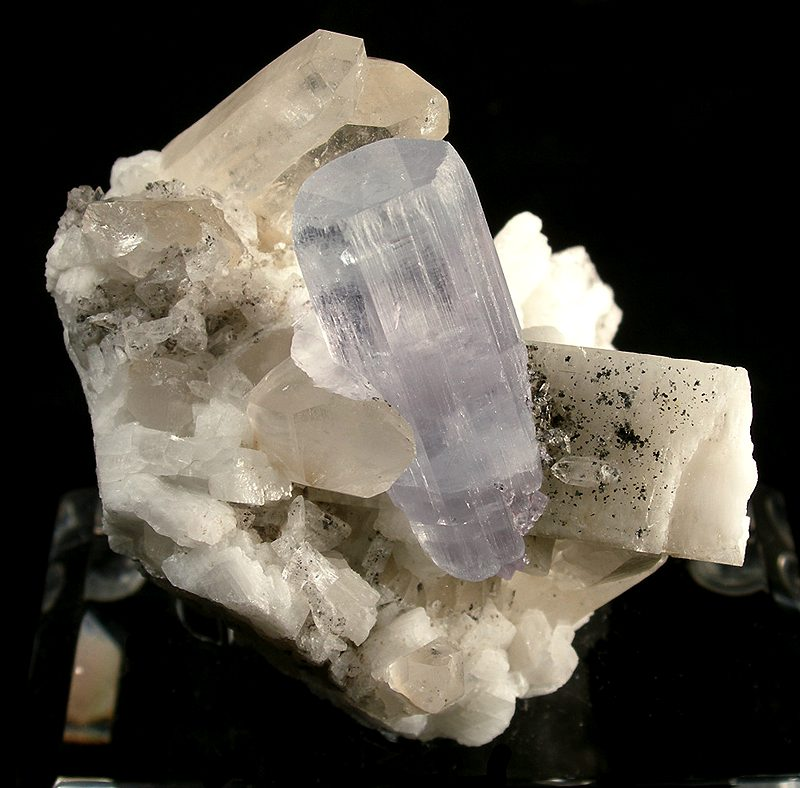
Lavender-colored beryl, quartz and feldspar

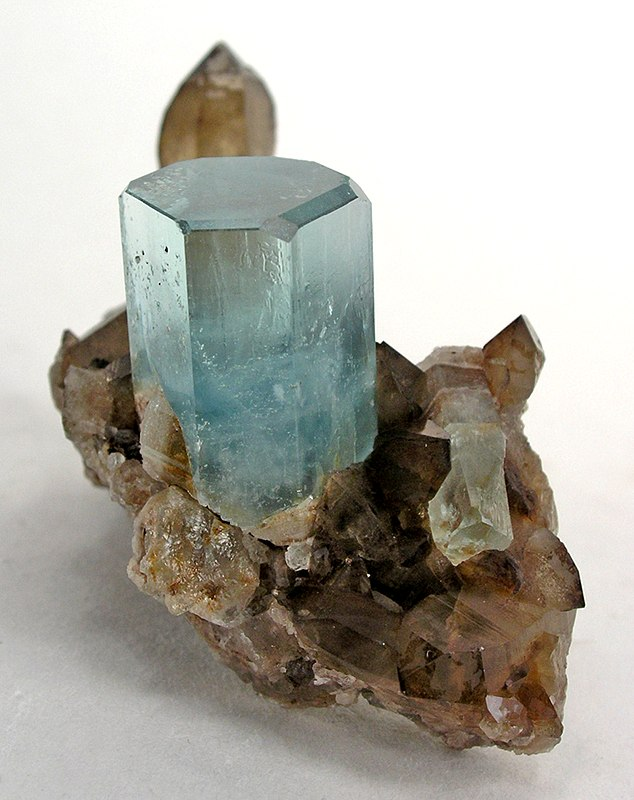
Beryl (var. aquamarine) perched on matrix of smoky quartz

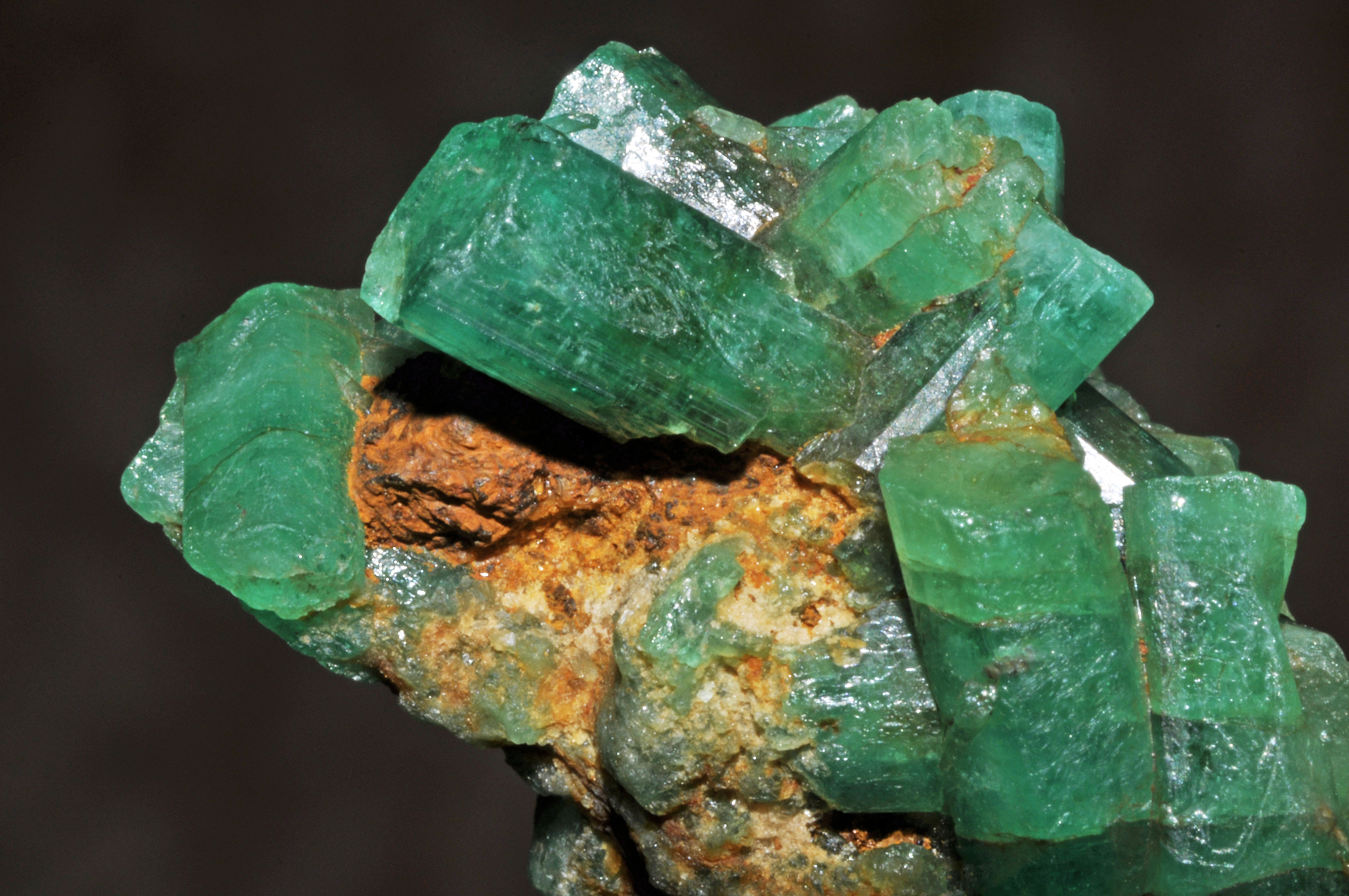
Beryl (var. emerald), from Muzo Mine, Vasquez-Yacopí Mining District, Colombia

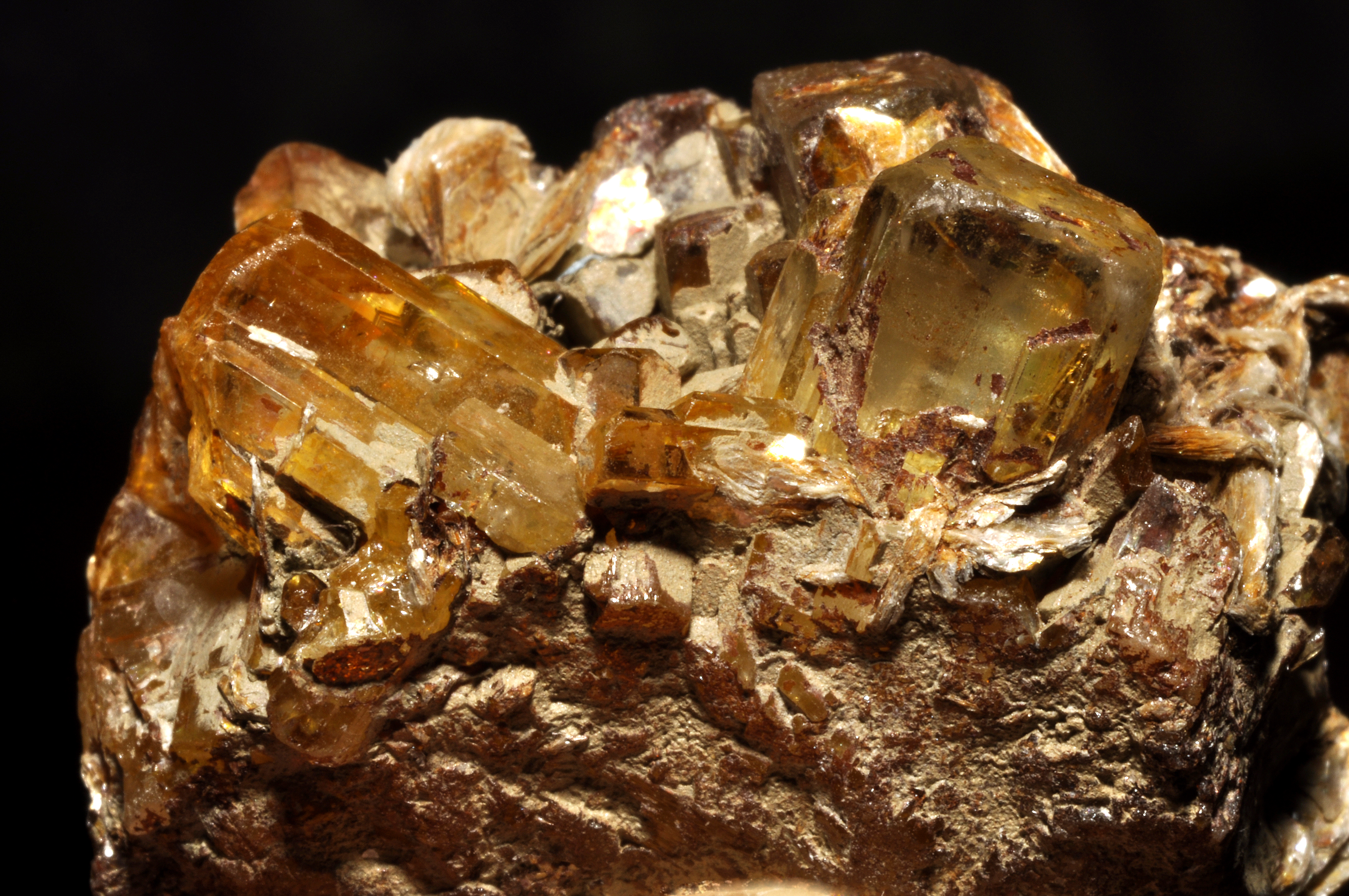
Beryl (var. golden beryl), from Chhappu, Braldu Valley, Skardu District, Baltistan, Gilgit-Baltistan, Pakistan

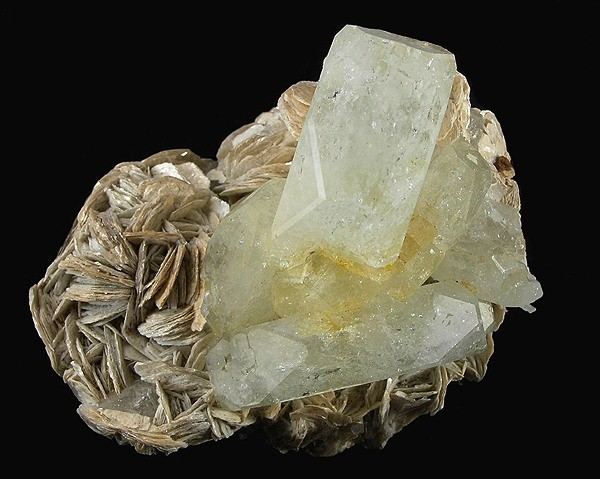
Beryl (var. goshenite); a cluster of tabular, hexagonal crystals, which sit on a bed of bladed muscovite

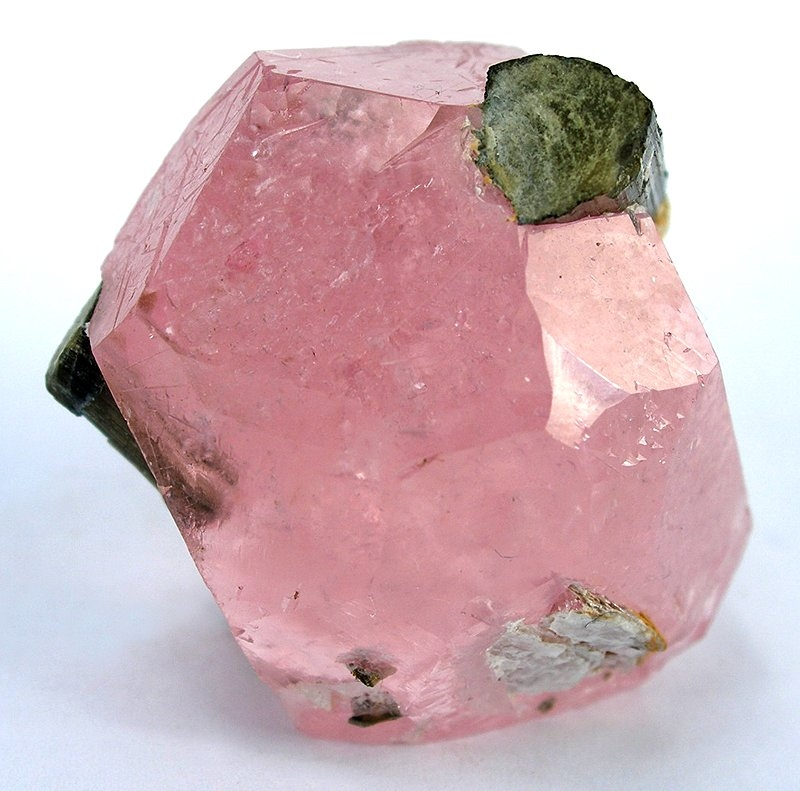
Beryl (var. morganite) with tourmaline, from Darra-i-Pech Pegmatite Field, Nangarhar (Ningarhar) Province, Afghanistan

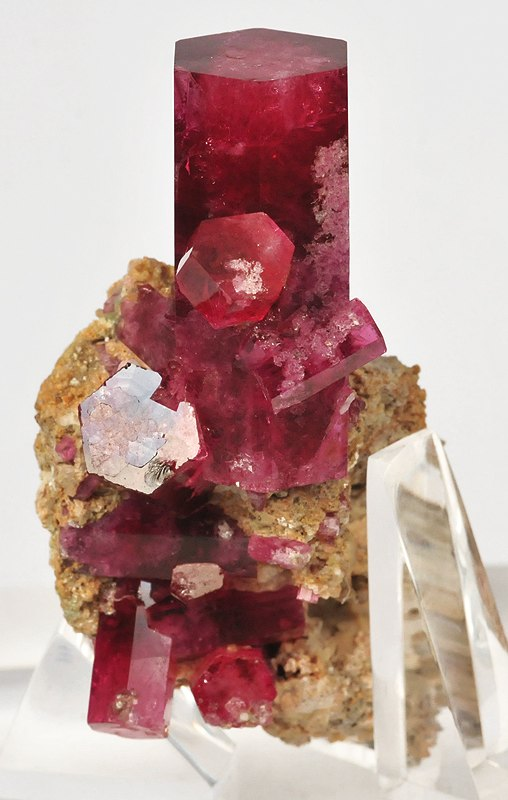
Beryl (var. red beryl), from Harris Claim, Wah Wah Mountains, Utah, USA

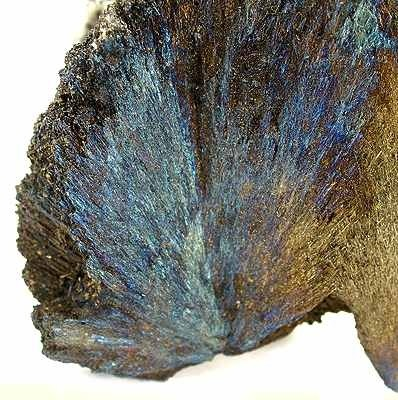
Berthierite, Herja Mine, Baia Mare (Nagybánya), Romania, size: 9.0 x 7.2 x 6.0 cm

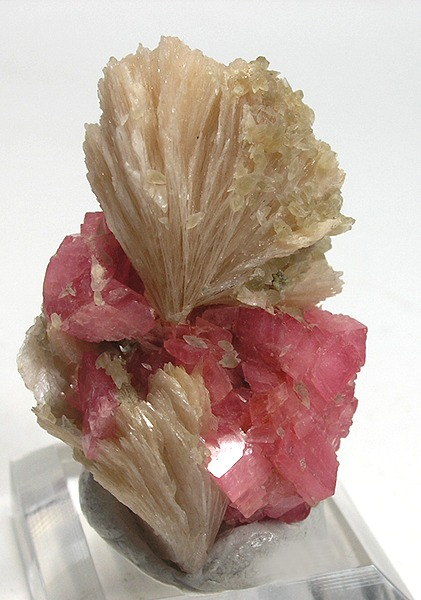
Bertrandite and rhodochrosite, Kounrad Massif, Balqash, Zhezqazghan Oblysy, Kazakhstan, 4.7 × 2.7 × 2.6 cm

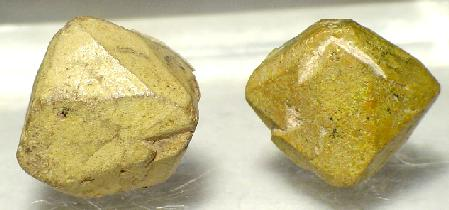
Former betafite crystals (now probably pyrochlore group minerals), 13 × 13 × 7 mm (largest), Vakinankaratra, Antananarivo Province, Madagascar

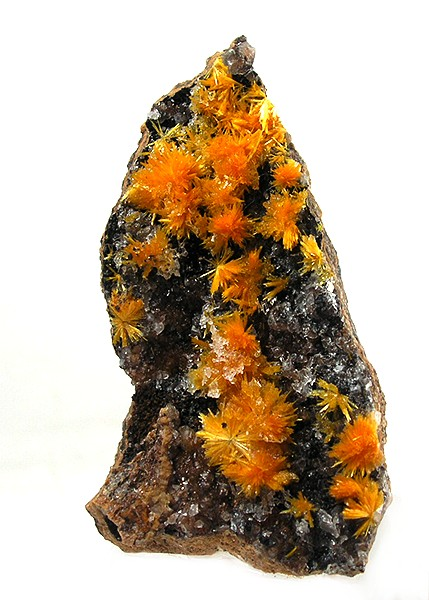
Boltwoodite, 5.2 × 3 × 2 cm, Goanikontes Claim, Swakopmund District, Erongo Region, Namibia

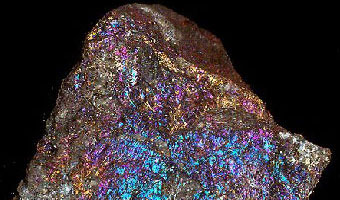
Bornite, Malužiná, Nízke Tatry, Slovakia

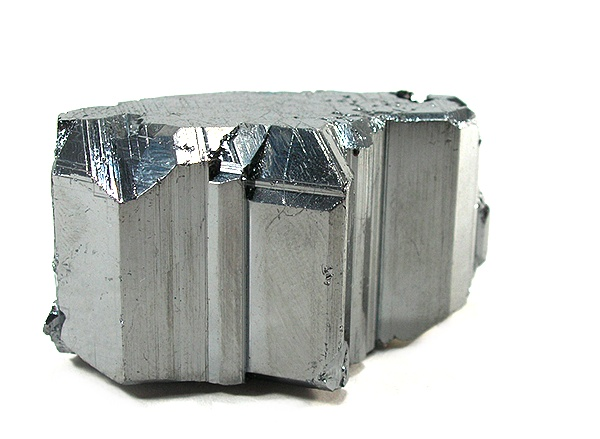
Bournonite, 3.2 × 2.5 × 2.1 cm, Yaogangxian Mine, Yizhang County, Hunan, China

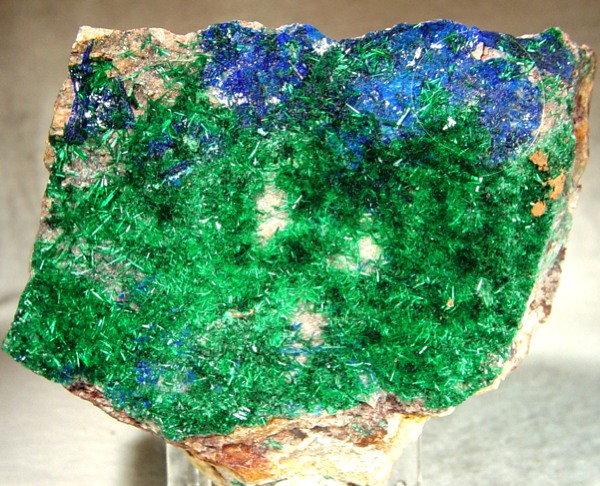
Brochantite and linarite, 8 × 8 × 2.5 cm, Mujuram, Morocco

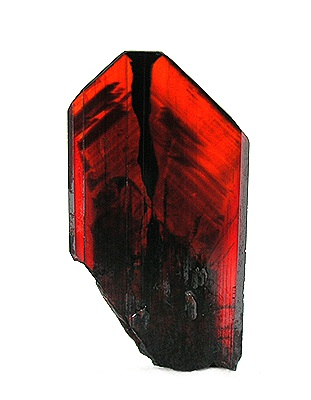
Brookite, 2.3 × 1.3 × 0.1 cm, Taftan, Balochistan, Pakistan

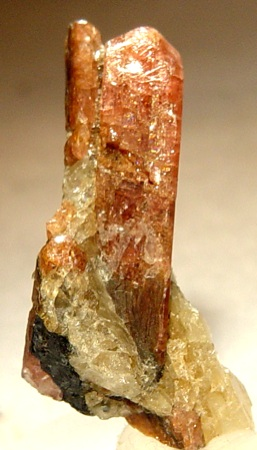
Bustamite, 4 × 2.2 × 1.1 cm, Broken Hill, New South Wales, Australia

1. Babánekite (vivianite: IMA2012-007) 8.CE. [no] [no]
  (IUPAC: tricopper diarsenate octahydrate)
2. Babefphite (IMA1966-003) 8.BA.15
  (IUPAC: barium beryllium fluoro phosphate)
3. Babingtonite (rhodonite: 1824) 9.DK.05
4. Babkinite (tetradymite: IMA1994-030) 2.GC.40e
  (Pb_{2}Bi_{2}(S,Se)_{3})
5. Backite (tellurium oxysalt: IMA2013-113) 7.A [no] [no]
  (IUPAC: dilead aluminium chloro tellurium(VI) hexaoxide)
6. Badakhshanite-(Y) (perettiite: IMA2018-085) 9.E [no] [no]
7. Badalovite (alluaudite: IMA2016-053) 8.0 [no] [no]
  (NaNaMg(MgFe^{3+})(AsO_{4})_{3})
8. Baddeleyite (baddeleyite: 1893) 4.DE.35
  (IUPAC: zirconium(IV) dioxide)
9. Badengzhuite (phosphide: IMA2019-076) 1.0 [no] [no]
  (IUPAC: titanium phosphide)
10. Bafertisite (seidozerite, bafertisite: IMA2016 s.p., 1959) 9.BE.55
11. Baghdadite (wohlerite: IMA1982-075) 9.BE.17
  (IUPAC: hexacalcium dizirconium tetraoxo di(heptaoxodisilicate))
12. Bahariyaite (IMA2020-022) [no] [no]
13. Bahianite (IMA1974-027) 4.DC.05
  (IUPAC: pentaluminium triantimony(V) dihydro tetradecaoxide)
14. Baileychlore (chlorite: IMA1986-056) 9.EC.55
15. Bainbridgeite-(YCe) (mckelveyite: IMA2020-065) 5.CC. [no] [no]
16. Bairdite (IMA2012-061) 8.0 [no] [no]
17. Bakakinite (IMA2022-046)
18. Bakhchisaraitsevite (IMA1999-005) 8.CH.50 [no]
  (IUPAC: disodium pentamagnesium tetraphosphate heptahydrate)
19. Baksanite (tetradymite: IMA1992-042) 2.DC.05
  (IUPAC: hexabismuth ditelluride trisulfide)
20. Balangeroite (IMA1982-002) 9.DH.35
21. Balestraite (mica: IMA2013-080) 9.E?. [no] [no]
22. Balićžunićite (IMA2012-098) 7.A [no] [no]
  (IUPAC: dibismuth oxo disulfate)
23. Balipholite (carpholite: 1975) 9.DB.05
  (IUPAC: lithium barium dimagnesium trialuminium di(hexaoxodisilicate) octahydroxyl)
24. Balkanite (IMA1971-009) 2.BD.15
  (IUPAC: pentasilver nonacopper mercury octasulfide)
25. Balliranoite (cancrinite: IMA2008-065) 9.FB.05 [no]
26. Balyakinite (tellurite: IMA1980-001) 4.JK.15
  (IUPAC: copper(II) tellurite(IV))
27. Bambollaite (IMA1965-014) 2.EB.05b
  (Cu(Se,Te)_{2})
28. Bamfordite (IMA1996-059) 4.FK.05
  (IUPAC: iron(III) trihydro dimolybdenum hexaoxide monohydrate)
29. Banalsite (Y: 1944) 9.FA.60
30. Bandylite (Y: 1938) 6.AC.35
  (IUPAC: copper chloro tetrahydroxyborate)
31. Bannermanite (IMA1980-010) 4.HF.05
32. Bannisterite (stilpnomelane: IMA1967-005) 9.EG.75
33. Baotite (IMA1962 s.p., 1960) 9.CE.15
34. Barahonaite 8.CH.60
  1. Barahonaite-(Al) (IMA2006-051) 8.CH.60
  2. Barahonaite-(Fe) (IMA2006-052) 8.CH.60
35. Bararite (fluorosilicate: 1951) 3.CH.10
  (IUPAC: diammonium hexafluorosilicate)
36. Baratovite (baratovite: IMA1974-055) 9.CJ.25
37. Barberiite (fluoroborate: IMA1993-008) 3.CA.10
  (IUPAC: ammonium tetrafluoroborate)
38. Barbosalite (Y: 1954) 8.BB.40
  (IUPAC: iron(II) diiron(III) dihydro diphosphate)
39. Barentsite (IMA1982-101) 5.BB.05
  (IUPAC: heptasodium aluminium tetrafluoro dicarbonate dibicarbonate)
40. Bariandite (straczekite: IMA1970-043) 4.HE.20
41. Barićite (vivianite: IMA1975-027) 8.CE.40
  (IUPAC: tri(magnesium,iron) diphosphate octahydrate)
42. Barikaite (sartorite: IMA2012-055) 2.0 [no] [no]
  (Ag_{3}Pb_{10}(Sb_{8}As_{11})Σ19S_{40})
43. Barioferrite (magnetoplumbite: IMA2009-030) 4.CC.45 [no] [no]
  (IUPAC: barium dodecairon(III) nonadecaoxide)
44. Bario-olgite (aphthitalite: IMA2003-002) 8.AC.40
45. Bario-orthojoaquinite (joaquinite: IMA1979-081) 9.CE.25
  (IUPAC: tetrabarium diiron(II) dititanium dioxo octa(trioxosilicate) monohydrate)
46. Barioperovskite (oxide perovskite: IMA2006-040) 4.CC.30 [no]
  (IUPAC: barium titanium trioxide)
47. Bariopharmacoalumite (pharmacosiderite: IMA2010-041) 8.DK.12 [no]
  (IUPAC: (0.5)barium tetraluminium [tetrahydro triarsenate] tetrahydrate)
48. Barite
49. Bariumpharmacosiderite (pharmacosiderite: IMA1994 s.p., 1966 Rd) 8.DK.10 [no]
  (IUPAC: barium tetrairon(III) [tetrahydro triarsenate] pentahydrate)
50. Bariosincosite (IMA1998-047) 8.CJ.65
  (IUPAC: barium di(oxovanadate) diphosphate tetrahydrate)
51. Barlowite (claringbullite: IMA2010-020) 3.DA.15 [no] [no]
  (IUPAC: tetracopper hexahydro bromide fluoride)
52. Barnesite (hewettite: IMA1967 s.p., 1963) 4.HG.45
53. Barquillite (stannite: IMA1996-050) 2.KA.10
  (IUPAC: dicopper (cadmium,iron) germanide tetrasulfide)
54. Barrerite (zeolitic tectosilicate: IMA1974-017) 9.GE.15
55. Barringerite (barringerite: IMA1968-037) 1.BD.10
  (IUPAC: di(iron,nickel) phosphide)
56. Barringtonite^{N} (Y: 1965) 5.CA.15
  (IUPAC: magnesium carbonate dihydrate)
57. Barroisite [Na-Ca-amphibole: IMA2012 s.p., 1922] 9.DE.20
58. Barrotite (chalcophyllite: IMA2011-063a) 7.0 [no] [no]
59. Barrydawsonite-(Y) (pectolite: IMA2014-042) 9.D?. [no] [no]
60. Barstowite (IMA1989-057) 3.DC.95
  (IUPAC: tetralead hexachloro carbonate monohydrate)
61. Bartelkeite (lawsonite: IMA1979-029) 9.J0.10
  (IUPAC: lead iron(II) germanium (heptaoxodigermanate) dihydroxyl monohydrate)
62. Bartonite (djerfisherite: IMA1977-039) 2.FC.10
  (K_{6}Fe_{20}S_{26}S)
63. Barwoodite (welinite: IMA2017-046) 9.AF. [no] [no]
64. Barylite (Y: 1876) 9.BB.15
  (IUPAC: barium diberyllium heptaoxodisilicate)
65. Barysilite (Y: 1888) 9.BC.20
  (IUPAC: octalead manganese tri(heptaoxodisilicate))
66. Baryte (baryte: IMA1971 s.p., 1797) 7.AD.35
  (IUPAC: barium sulfate)
67. Barytocalcite (Y: 1824) 5.AB.45
  (IUPAC: barium calcium dicarbonate)
68. Barytolamprophyllite (seidozerite, lamprophyllite: IMA1968 s.p., 1959) 9.BE.25
69. Bassanite (rhabdophane: 1910) 7.CD.45
  (IUPAC: calcium sulfate (0.5)hydrate)
70. Bassetite (Y: 1915) 8.EB.10
  (IUPAC: iron(II) diuranyl diphosphate decawater)
71. Bassoite (IMA2011-028) 4.0 [no]
72. Bastnäsite 05.BD.20a
  (IUPAC: REE fluoro carbonate)
  1. Bastnäsite-(Ce) (IMA1987 s.p., 1841) 5.BD.20a
  2. Bastnäsite-(La) (IMA1966 s.p.) 5.BD.20a
  3. Bastnäsite-(Nd) (IMA2011-062) 5.BD.20a [no]
  4. Bastnäsite-(Y) (IMA1987 s.p., 1970) 5.BD.20a
73. Batagayite (IMA2017-002) 8.0 [no] [no]
74. Batievaite-(Y) (seidozerite, rinkite: IMA2015-016) 9.B?. [no]
75. Batiferrite (magnetoplumbite: IMA1997-038) 4.CC.45
76. Batisite (batisite: IMA1962 s.p.) 9.DH.20
  (IUPAC: disodium barium dititanium dioxo di(hexaoxodisilicate))
77. Batisivite (IMA2006-054) 9.BE.95
78. Baumhauerite (sartorite: 1902) 2.HC.05b
  (Pb_{12}As_{16}S_{36})
79. Baumhauerite II^{Q} (sartorite: 1959) 2.0 [no] [no]
80. Baumoite (IMA2017-054) 4.0 [no] [no]
81. Baumstarkite (aramayoite: IMA1999-049) 2.HA.25
  (IUPAC: trisilver hexasulfa triantimonide)
82. Bauranoite (wolsendorfite: IMA1971-052) 4.GB.20
  (IUPAC: barium diuranium heptaoxide (4-5)hydrate)
83. Bavenite (IMA2015 s.p., IMA1962 s.p., 1901) 9.DF.25
84. Bavsiite (IMA2014-019) 9.0 [no] [no]
  (IUPAC: dibarium divanadium dioxo [dodecaoxotetrasilicate])
85. Bayerite (Y: 1928) 4.FE.10
  (IUPAC: aluminium trihydroxide)
86. Bayldonite (Y: 1865) 8.BH.45
  (IUPAC: tricopper lead dihydro oxo di(hydroxoarsenate))
87. Bayleyite (Y: 1951) 5.ED.05
  (IUPAC: dimagnesium uranyl tricarbonate octadecahydrate)
88. Baylissite (IMA1975-024) 5.CB.45
  (IUPAC: dipotassium magnesium dicarbonate tetrahydrate)
89. Bazhenovite (IMA1986-053) 2.FD.50
90. Bazirite (benitoite: IMA1976-053) 9.CA.05
  (IUPAC: barium zirconium nonaoxotrisilicate)
91. Bazzite (beryl: 1915) 9.CJ.05

=== Be ===
1. Bearsite (IMA1967 s.p., 1962) 8.DA.05
  (IUPAC: diberyllium hydro arsenate tetrahydrate)
2. Bearthite (brackebuschite: IMA1986-050) 8.BG.05
  (IUPAC: dicalcium aluminium hydro diphosphate)
3. Beaverite 07.BC.10
  (IUPAC: lead (diiron(III) Metal) hexahydro disulfate)
  1. Beaverite-Cu (alunite, alunite: IMA2007-D, IMA1987 s.p., 1911 Rd) 7.BC.10
  2. Beaverite-Zn (alunite, alunite: IMA2010-086) 7.BC.10 [no]
4. Bechererite (IMA1994-005) 7.DD.55
5. Beckettite (sapphirine: IMA2015-001) 4.0 [no] [no]
  (Ca_{2}V_{6}Al_{6}O_{20})
6. Becquerelite (Y: 1922) 4.GB.10
  (IUPAC: calcium hexauranyl hexahydro tetraoxide octahydrate)
7. Bederite (wicksite: IMA1998-007) 8.CF.05
  (IUPAC: dicalcium tetramanganese(II) diiron(III) hexaphosphate dihydrate)
8. Beershevaite (phosphate: IMA2020-095a) [no] [no]
  (IUPAC: calcium triiron(III) oxotriphosphate)
9. Béhierite (zircon: IMA1967 s.p., 1961) 6.AC.15
  (IUPAC: tantalum borate)
10. Behoite (cristobalite: IMA1969-031) 4.FA.05a
  (IUPAC: beryllium dihydroxide)
11. Běhounekite (IMA2010-046) 7.0 [no] [no]
  (IUPAC: uranium disulfate tetrawater)
12. Beidellite (montmorillonite, smectite: 1925) 9.EC.40
13. Belakovskiite (IMA2013-075) 7.0 [no]
  (IUPAC: heptasodium uranyl tetrasulfate hydroxosulfate triwater)
14. Belendorffite (amalgam: IMA1989-024) 1.AD.10
  (IUPAC: heptacopper hexamercury amalgam)
15. Belkovite (IMA1989-053) 9.BE.75
16. Bellbergite (zeolitic tectosilicate: IMA1990-057) 9.GD.20
17. Bellidoite (IMA1970-050) 2.BA.20
  (IUPAC: dicopper selenide)
18. Bellingerite (Y: 1940) 4.KC.05
  (IUPAC: tricopper hexaiodate dihydrate)
19. Belloite (IMA1998-054) 3.DA.10b [no]
  (IUPAC: copper hydro chloride)
20. Belogubite (chalcanthite: IMA2018-005) 7.0 [no] [no]
  (IUPAC: copper zinc disulfate decahydrate)
21. Belomarinaite (aphthitalite: IMA2017-069a) 7.0 [no] [no]
  (IUPAC: potassium sodium sulfate)
22. Belousovite (IMA2016-047) 7.0 [no] [no]
  (IUPAC: potassium zinc chloro sulfate)
23. Belovite 8.BN.05
  (IUPAC: sodium REE tristrontium fluoro triphosphate)
  1. Belovite-(Ce) (apatite: 1954) 8.BN.05
  2. Belovite-(La) (apatite: IMA1995-023) 8.BN.05
24. Belyankinite^{Q} (Y: 1950) 4.FM.25
25. Bementite (IMA1963 s.p., 1888 Rd) 9.EE.05
26. Benauite (alunite, crandallite: IMA1995-001) 8.BL.10
  (IUPAC: strontium triiron(III) hexahydro phosphate hydroxophosphate)
27. Benavidesite (IMA1980-073) 2.HB.15
  (IUPAC: tetralead manganese tetradecasulfa hexaantimonide)
28. Bendadaite (arthurite: IMA1998-053a) 8.DC.15 [no]
  (IUPAC: iron(II) diiron(III) dihydro diarsenate tetrahydrate)
29. Benitoite (benitoite: 1907) 9.CA.05
  (IUPAC: barium titanium nonaoxotrisilicate)
30. Benjaminite (pavonite: IMA1975-003a, 1925 Rd) 2.JA.05e
  (Ag_{3}Bi_{7}S_{12})
31. Benleonardite (pearceite-polybasite: IMA1985-043) 2.LA.50
  (Ag_{15}Cu(Sb,As)_{2}S_{7}Te_{4})
32. Bennesherite (melilite: IMA2019-068) 9.B [no] [no]
  (IUPAC: dibarium iron(II) heptaoxo disilicate)
33. Benstonite (IMA1967 s.p., 1961) 5.AB.55
  (IUPAC: hexabarium hexacalcium magnesium tridecacarbonate)
34. Bentorite (ettringite: IMA1979-042) 7.DG.15
35. Benyacarite (IMA1995-002) 8.DH.35
36. Beraunite (beraunite: 1841) 8.DC.27
  (IUPAC: iron(II) pentairon(III) pentahydro tetraphosphate hexahydrate)
37. Berborite (IMA1967-004) 6.AB.10
  (IUPAC: diberyllium hydro borate monohydrate)
38. Berdesinskiite (berdesinskiite: IMA1980-036) 4.CB.30
  (IUPAC: divanadium(III) titanium pentaoxide)
39. Berezanskite (milarite: IMA1996-041) 9.CM.05 [no]
40. Bergenite (phosphuranylite: 1959) 8.EC.40
41. Bergslagite (gadolinite: IMA1983-021) 8.BA.10
  (IUPAC: calcium beryllium hydro arsenate)
42. Berlinite (quartz: 1868) 8.AA.05
  (IUPAC: aluminium phosphate)
43. Bermanite (arthurite: 1936) 8.DC.20
  (IUPAC: manganese(II) dimanganese(III) dihydro diphosphate tetrahydrate)
44. Bernalite (perovskite, söhngeite: IMA1991-032) 4.FC.05
  (IUPAC: iron trihydroxide)
45. Bernardite (IMA1987-052) 2.HD.50
  (IUPAC: thallium octasulfa pentarsenide)
46. Bernarlottiite (IMA2013-133) 2.0 [no] [no]
  (Pb_{12}(As_{10}Sb_{6})S_{36})
47. Berndtite (melonite: IMA1968 s.p., 1966) 2.EA.20
  (IUPAC: tin(IV) sulfide)
48. Berryite (meneghinite: IMA1965-013) 2.HB.20d
  (Cu_{3}Ag_{2}Pb_{3}Bi_{7}S_{16})
49. Berthierine (serpentine: 1832) 9.ED.15
50. Berthierite (berthierite: 1827) 2.HA.20
  (IUPAC: iron tetrasulfa diantimonide)
51. Bertossaite (carminite: IMA1965-038) 8.BH.25
  (IUPAC: dilithium calcium tetraluminium tetrahydro tetraphosphate)
52. Bertrandite (Y: 1883) 9.BD.05
  (IUPAC: tetraberyllium heptaoxodisilicate dihydroxyl)
53. Beryl (beryl: 1798) 9.CJ.05
54. Beryllite (Y: 1954) 9.AE.05
  (IUPAC: triberyllium tetraoxosilicate dihydroxyl monohydrate)
55. Beryllonite (beryllonite: 1888) 8.AA.10
  (IUPAC: sodium beryllium phosphate)
56. Berzelianite (Y: 1832) 2.BA.20
  (Cu_{(2-x)}Se (x ≈ 0.12))
57. Berzeliite (garnet: 1840) 8.AC.25
  (IUPAC: (sodium dicalcium) dimagnesium triarsenate)
58. Beshtauite (IMA2012-051) 7.0 [no] [no]
  (IUPAC: diammonium uranyl disulfate dihydrate)
  Note: for beta-domeykite see domeykite-β, for beta-fergusonite series see fergusonite-beta series, for beta-sulfur see sulfur and for beta-roselite see roselite.
59. (Betafite group (A_{2}(Ti,Nb)_{2}O_{6}Z), pyrochlore supergroup )
60. Betekhtinite (Y: 1955) 2.BE.05
  ((Cu,Fe)_{21}Pb_{2}S_{15})
61. Betpakdalite 8.DM.15
  1. Betpakdalite-CaCa (IMA1967 s.p., 1961 Rd) 8.DM.15
  2. Betpakdalite-CaMg (IMA2011-034) 8.DM.15 [no] [no]
  3. Betpakdalite-FeFe (IMA2017-011) 8.DM.15 [no] [no]
  4. Betpakdalite-NaCa (IMA1971-057) 8.DM.15
  5. Betpakdalite-NaNa (IMA2011-078) 8.DM.15 [no] [no]
62. Bettertonite (IMA2014-074) 8.0 [no] [no]
  (IUPAC: hexaluminium nonahydro triarsenate pentawater undecahydrate)
63. Betzite (cancrinite: IMA2021-037) [no] [no]
64. Beudantite (alunite, beudantite: IMA1987 s.p., 1826 Rd) 8.BL.05
  (IUPAC: palladium triiron(III) hexahydro arsenate sulfate)
65. Beusite 8.AB.20
  (IUPAC: M^{2+} dimanganese(II) diphosphate)
  1. Beusite (graftonite: IMA1968-012) 8.AB.20
  2. Beusite-(Ca) (graftonite: IMA2017-051) 8.AB.20 [no] [no]
66. Beyerite (bismutite: 1943) 5.BE.35
  (IUPAC: calcium dibismuth dioxo dicarbonate)
67. Bezsmertnovite (IMA1979-014) 2.BA.80
  ((Au,Ag)_{4}Cu(Te,Pb))

=== Bi – Bo ===
1. Biachellaite (cancrinite: IMA2007-044) 8.FB.05 [no]
2. Biagioniite (sulfosalt: IMA2019-120) 2.0 [no] [no]
  (IUPAC: dithallium disulfa antimonide)
3. Bianchiniite (IMA2019-022) 4.0 [no] [no]
  (IUPAC: dibarium (titanium vanadium) oxofluoro di(pentaoxodiarsenate))
4. Bianchite (hexahydrite: 1930) 7.CB.25
  (IUPAC: zinc sulfate hexahydrate)
5. Bicapite (polyoxometalate: IMA2018-048) 8.0 [no] [no]
6. Bicchulite (sodalite: IMA1973-006) 9.FB.10
7. Bideauxite (IMA1969-038) 3.DB.25
  (IUPAC: silver dilead difluoride trichloride)
8. Bieberite (melanterite: 1845) 7.CB.35
  (IUPAC: cobalt sulfate heptahydrate)
9. Biehlite (IMA1999-019a) 4.DB.60
  (IUPAC: di((antimony,arsenic) oxide) molybdate)
10. Bigcreekite (IMA1999-015) 9.DF.30 [no]
  (IUPAC: barium pentaoxo disilicate tetrahydrate)
11. Bijvoetite-(Y) (IMA1981-035) 5.EB.20
12. Bikitaite (zeolitic tectosilicate: IMA1997 s.p., 1957) 9.GD.55
  (IUPAC: lithium hexaoxo aluminodisilicate monohydrate)
13. Bilibinskite (IMA1977-024) 2.BA.80
  (IUPAC: lead trigold dicopper ditelluride)
14. Bílinite (halotrichite: 1914) 7.CB.85
  (IUPAC: iron(II) diiron(III) tetrasulfate docosahydrate)
15. Billietite (Y: 1947) 4.GB.10
  (IUPAC: barium hexauranyl hexahydro tetraoxide octahydrate)
16. Billingsleyite (IMA1967-012) 2.KB.05
  (IUPAC: heptasilver hexasulfa arsenide)
17. Billwiseite (IMA2010-053) 4.0 [no]
  (IUPAC: pentaantimony(III) triniobium tungsten octadecaoxide)
18. Bimbowrieite (dufrénite: IMA2020-006) 8.0 [no] [no]
19. Bindheimite^{Q} (pyrochlore: IMA2013 s.p., IMA2010 s.p., 1800) 4.DH.20
  Note: possibly oxyplumboroméite.
20. (Biotite, mica series (Y: 1963) 9.EC. )
21. Biphosphammite (biphosphammite: 1870) 8.AD.15
  (IUPAC: ammonium dihydrogen phosphate)
22. Biraite-(Ce) (IMA2003-037) 9.BE.90
  (IUPAC: dicerium iron(II) heptaoxodisilicate carbonate)
23. Birchite (IMA2006-048) 8.DB.70 [no]
  (IUPAC: dicadmium dicopper diphosphate sulfate pentahydrate)
24. Biringuccite (IMA1967 s.p., 1961) 6.EC.05
  (IUPAC: disodium octaoxo hydro pentaborate monohydrate)
25. Birnessite (Y: 1956) 4.FL.45
26. Birunite^{Q} (ettringite: 1957) 7.0 [no] [no]
27. Bischofite (Y: 1877) 3.BB.15
  (IUPAC: magnesium dichloride hexahydrate)
28. Bismite (Y: 1868) 4.CB.60
  (IUPAC: dibismuth trioxide)
29. Bismoclite (matlockite: 1935) 3.DC.25
  (IUPAC: bismuth oxychloride)
30. Bismuth (arsenic: 1546) 1.CA.05
31. Bismuthinite (stibnite: 1832) 2.DB.05
  (IUPAC: dibismuth trisulfide)
32. Bismutite (bismutite: 1841) 5.BE.25
  (IUPAC: dibismuth dioxo carbonate)
33. Bismutocolumbite (cervantite: IMA1991-003) 4.DE.30
  (IUPAC: bismuth niobium tetraoxide)
34. Bismutoferrite (kaolinite: 1871) 9.ED.25
  (IUPAC: diiron(III) bismuth di(tetraoxosilicate) hydroxyl)
35. Bismutohauchecornite (hauchecornite: IMA1978-F) 2.BB.10
  (IUPAC: nonanickel dibismuth octasulfide)
36. Bismutostibiconite^{Q} (pyrochlore: IMA2013 s.p., IMA2010 s.p., IMA1981-065, 1983) 4.DH.20
  Note: possibly bismutoroméite.
37. Bismutotantalite (cervantite: 1929) 4.DE.30
  (IUPAC: bismuth tantalum tetraoxide)
38. Bitikleite (garnet: IMA2009-052) 4.0 [no] [no]
  (IUPAC: tricalcium (tin antimony) tri(aluminium tetraoxide))
39. Bityite (mica: IMA1998 s.p., 1908) 9.EC.35
40. Bixbyite (bixbyite) 4.CB.10
  1. Bixbyite-(Fe) (bixbyite: IMA21-H) 4.CB.10 [no] [no]
  2. Bixbyite-(Mn) (bixbyite: IMA21-H, 1897) 4.CB.10
    (IUPAC: dimanganese(III) trioxide)
41. Bjarebyite (bjarebyite: IMA1972-022) 8.BH.20
  (IUPAC: barium dimanganese(II) dialuminium trihydro triphosphate)
42. Blakeite^{Q} (tellurite: 1941) 4.JM.10 [no] [no]
43. Blatonite (IMA1997-025) 5.EB.10
  (IUPAC: uranyl carbonate monohydrate)
44. Blatterite (Y: IMA1984-038) 6.AB.40
45. Bleasdaleite (IMA1998-003a) 8.DK.25
46. Blixite (IMA1962 s.p., 1958) 3.DC.50
  (IUPAC: octalead pentaoxo dihydro tetrachloride)
47. Blödite (IMA1982 s.p., 1821) 7.CC.50
  (IUPAC: disodium magnesium disulfate tetrahydrate)
48. Blossite (IMA1986-002) 8.FA.05
  (IUPAC: dicopper heptaoxodivanadate(V))
49. Bluebellite (IMA2013-121) 4.0 [no] [no]
  (IUPAC: hexacopper chloro decahydro iodate)
50. Bluelizardite (IMA2013-062) 7.0 [no]
  (IUPAC: heptasodium uranyl chloro tetrasulfate diwater)
51. Bluestreakite (IMA2014-047) 4.0 [no] [no]
52. Bobcookite (IMA2014-030) 7.0 [no] [no]
  (IUPAC: sodium aluminium diuranyl tetrasulfate octadecahydrate)
53. Bobfergusonite (alluaudite, bobfergusonite: IMA1984-072a) 8.AC.15
  (☐Na_{2}(Mn^{2+})_{5}Fe^{3+}Al(PO_{4})_{6})
54. Bobfinchite (schoepite: IMA2020-082) [no] [no]
55. Bobierrite (vivianite: 1868) 8.CE.35
  (IUPAC: trimagnesium diphosphate octahydrate)
56. Bobjonesite (IMA2000-045) 7.DB.25 [no]
  (IUPAC: vanadium(IV) oxosulfate trihydrate)
57. Bobkingite (IMA2000-029) 3.DA.50 [no]
  (IUPAC: pentacopper octahydro dichloride dihydrate)
58. Bobmeyerite (cerchiaraite: IMA2012-019) 9.C?. [no] [no]
59. Bobshannonite (seidozerite, bafertisite: IMA2014-052) 9.B?. [no] [no]
60. Bobtraillite (IMA2001-041) 9.CA.30
61. Bodieite (IMA2017-117) 4.0 [no] [no]
  (IUPAC: dibismuth(III) ditellurite(IV) sulfate)
62. Bogdanovite (auricupride: IMA1978-019) 2.BA.80
  ((Au,Te,Pb)_{3}(Cu,Fe))
63. Bøggildite (Y: 1951) 3.CG.20
  (IUPAC: disodium distrontium phosphate dialumino nonafluoride)
64. Boggsite (zeolitic tectosilicate: IMA1989-009) 9.GC.30
65. Bøgvadite (IMA1987-029) 3.CF.15
  (IUPAC: disodium dibarium strontium tetralumino icosafluoride)
66. Bohdanowiczite (IMA1978-C, 1967) 2.JA.20
  (IUPAC: silver bismuth diselenide)
67. Böhmite (lepidocrocite: 1927) 4.FE.15
  (IUPAC: hydroaluminium oxide)
68. Bohseite (bavenite: IMA2014-H, IMA2010-026) 9.D?. [no] [no]
69. Bohuslavite (IMA2018-074a) 8.0 [no] [no]
70. Bokite (straczekite: IMA1967 s.p., 1963) 4.HE.20
71. Bojarite (IMA2020-037) [no] [no]
72. Boleite (Y: 1891) 3.DB.15
  (KAg_{9}Pb_{26}Cu_{24}Cl_{62}(OH)_{48})
73. Bolivarite^{Q} (Y: 1921) 8.DF.10 [no]
  Note: possibly a variety of evansite.
74. Bolotinaite (IMA2021-088)
75. Boltwoodite (Y: 1956) 9.AK.15
  (IUPAC: (kalium,sodium) uranyl hydroxosilicate (1.5)hydrate)
76. Bonaccordite (ludwigite: IMA1974-019) 6.AB.30
  (IUPAC: dinickel iron(III) dioxoborate)
77. Bonacinaite (phosphosiderite: IMA2018-056) 8.0 [no] [no]
  (IUPAC: scandium arsenate dihydrate)
78. Bonattite (Y: 1957) 7.CB.10
  (IUPAC: copper sulfate trihydrate)
79. Bonazziite (IMA2013-141) 2.FA. [no] [no]
  (IUPAC: tetrarsenic tetrasulfide)
80. Bonshtedtite (bradleyite: IMA1981-026a) 5.BF.10
  (IUPAC: trisodium iron(II) phosphate carbonate)
81. Boothite (melanterite: 1903) 7.CB.35
  (IUPAC: copper sulfate heptahydrate)
82. Boracite (boracite: 1789) 6.GA.05
  (IUPAC: trimagnesium chloro tridecaoxo heptaborate)
83. Boralsilite (IMA1996-029) 9.BD.30 [no]
84. Borax (Y: old) 6.DA.10
  (IUPAC: disodium tetrahydro pentaoxotetraborate octahydrate)
85. Borcarite (IMA1968 s.p., 1965) 6.DA.40
86. Borisenkoite (lammerite-beta: IMA2015-113) 8.AB. [no] [no]
  (Cu_{3}[(V,As)O_{4}]_{2})
87. Borishanskiite (IMA1974-010) 2.AC.45c
  (Pd_{(1+x)}(As,Pb)_{2}), (x = 0.0-0.2)
88. Bornemanite (seidozerite, lamprophyllite: IMA1973-053) 9.BE.50
89. Bornhardtite (spinel, linnaeite: 1955) 2.DA.05
  (Co^{2+}Co^{3+}_{2}Se_{4})
90. Bornite (IMA1962 s.p., 1725) 2.BA.15
  (IUPAC: pentacopper iron tetrasulfide)
91. Borocookeite (chlorite: IMA2000-013) 9.EC.55 [no]
92. Borodaevite (IMA1991-037) 2.JA.05g
93. Boromullite (IMA2007-021) 9.AF.23
  (Al_{9}BSi_{2}O_{19})
94. Boromuscovite (mica: IMA1989-027) 9.EC.15
95. Borovskite (IMA1972-032) 2.LA.60
  (IUPAC: tripalladium antimonide tetratelluride)
96. Bortnikovite (alloy: IMA2006-027) 1.AG.65
  (IUPAC: tetrapalladium tricopper zinc alloy)
97. Bortolanite (seidozerite: IMA2021-040a) [no] [no]
98. Boscardinite (sartorite: IMA2010-079) 2.0 [no]
  (TlPb_{4}(Sb_{7}As_{2})_{Σ=9}S_{18})
99. Bosiite (tourmaline: IMA2014-094) 9.CK. [no] [no]
100. Bosoite (organic zeolite: IMA2014-023) 10.0 [no] [no]
101. Bostwickite (IMA1982-073) 9.HC.10
102. Botallackite (atacamite: 1865) 3.DA.10b
  (IUPAC: dicopper trihydro chloride)
103. Botryogen (botryogen: 1815) 7.DC.25
  (IUPAC: magnesium iron(III) hydro disulfate heptahydrate)
104. Bottinoite (IMA1991-029) 4.FH.05
  (IUPAC: nickel diantimony(V) dodecahydroxide hexahydrate)
105. Botuobinskite (crichtonite: IMA2018-143a) [no] [no]
106. Bouazzerite (IMA2005-042) 8.DH.60 [no]
107. Boulangerite (Y: 1837) 2.HC.15
  (IUPAC: pentalead undecasulfa tetraantimonide)
108. Bournonite (bournonite: 1805) 2.GA.50
  (IUPAC: copper lead trisulfa antimonide)
109. Bouškaite (IMA2018-055a) 7.0 [no] [no]
  ((MoO_{2})_{2}O(SO_{3}OH)_{2}(H_{2}O)_{4})
110. Boussingaultite (picromerite: 1864) 7.CC.60
  (IUPAC: diammonium magnesium disulfate hexahydrate)
111. Bounahasite (IMA2021-114)
112. Bowieite (bowieite: IMA1980-022) 2.DB.15
  (IUPAC: dirhodium trisulfide)
113. Bowlesite (cobaltite: IMA2019-079) 2.0 [no] [no]
  (IUPAC: platinum sulfa stannide)
114. Boyleite (starkeyite: IMA1977-026) 7.CB.15
  (IUPAC: zinc sulfate tetrahydrate)

=== Br – By ===
1. Braccoite (saneroite: IMA2013-093) 9.0 [no] [no]
2. Bracewellite ("O(OH)" group: IMA1967-035) 4.FD.10
  (IUPAC: hydrochromium oxide)
3. Brackebuschite (brackebuschite: 1880) 8.BG.05
  (IUPAC: dilead trimanganese hydro divanadate)
4. Bradaczekite (alluaudite: IMA2000-002) 8.AC.10 [no]
  (NaCuCuCu_{2}(AsO_{4})_{3})
5. Bradleyite (bradleyite: 1941) 5.BF.10
  (IUPAC: trisodium magnesium phosphate carbonate)
6. Braggite (Y: 1932) 2.CC.35a
  (IUPAC: platinum sulfide)
7. Braithwaiteite (IMA2006-050) 8.DB.75
8. Braitschite-(Ce) (IMA1967-029) 6.H0.10
9. (Brammallite, mica series (Y: 1944) 9.EC.25 [no])
10. Branchite (Y: 1841, IMA2021 s.p.) 10.BA.10
11. Brandãoite (IMA2017-071a) 8.CA. [no] [no]
12. Brandholzite (IMA1998-017) 4.FH.05 [no]
  (IUPAC: magnesium diantimony dodecahydroxide hexahydrate)
13. Brandtite (roselite: 1888) 8.CG.10
  (IUPAC: dicalcium manganese(II) diarsenate dihydrate)
14. Brannerite (brannerite: IMA1967 s.p., 1920) 4.DH.05
  (IUPAC: uranium dititanium hexaoxide)
15. Brannockite (milarite: IMA1972-029) 9.CM.05
16. Brassite (IMA1973-047) 8.CE.15
  (IUPAC: manganese hydroxoarsenate tetrahydrate)
17. Brattforsite (IMA2019-127) 4.0 [no] [no]
  (Mn_{19}As_{12}O_{36}Cl_{2})
18. Braunerite (IMA2015-123) 5.0 [no] [no]
  (IUPAC: dipotassium calcium uranyl tricarbonate hexahydrate)
19. Braunite (braunite: 1828) 9.AG.05
  (IUPAC: manganese(II) hexamanganese(III) octaoxy tetraoxosilicate)
20. Brazilianite (Y: 1945) 8.BK.05
  (IUPAC: sodium trialuminium tetrahydro diphosphate)
21. Bredigite (Y: 1948) 9.AD.20
  (IUPAC: heptacalcium magnesium tetra(tetraoxosilicate))
22. Breithauptite (nickeline: 1833) 2.CC.05
  (IUPAC: nickel antimonide)
23. Brendelite (IMA1997-001) 8.BM.15
24. Brenkite (IMA1977-036) 5.BC.05
  (IUPAC: dicalcium difluoro carbonate)
25. Brewsterite 9.GE.20
  1. Brewsterite-Ba (zeolitic tectosilicate: IMA1997 s.p., 1993) 9.GE.20
  2. Brewsterite-Sr (zeolitic tectosilicate: IMA1997 s.p., 1822) 9.GE.20
26. Breyite (IMA2018-062) 9.0 [no] [no]
  (IUPAC: tricalcium nonaoxotrisilicate)
27. Brezinaite (IMA1969-004) 2.DA.15
  (IUPAC: trichromium tetrasulfide)
28. Brianite (aphthitalite: IMA1966-030) 8.AC.30
  (IUPAC: disodium calcium magnesium diphosphate)
29. Brianroulstonite (IMA1996-009) 6.EC.35
30. Brianyoungite (IMA1991-053) 5.BF.30
  (IUPAC: trizinc tetrahydro carbonate)
31. Briartite (stannite: IMA1965-018) 2.KA.10
  (IUPAC: dicopper iron germanium tetrasulfide)
32. Bridgesite-(Ce) (IMA2019-034) 7.0 [no] [no]
33. Bridgmanite (perovskite: IMA2014-017) 9.A0. [no] [no]
  (IUPAC: magnesium trioxosilicate)
34. Brindleyite (serpentine: IMA1975-009a) 9.ED.15
35. Brinrobertsite (corrensite: IMA1997-040) 9.EC.60 [no]
36. Britholite 09.AH.25
  1. Britholite-(Ce) (britholite, apatite: IMA1987 s.p., 1901) 9.AH.25
  2. Britholite-(Y) (britholite, apatite: IMA1966 s.p., 1938) 9.AH.25
37. Britvinite (molybdophyllite: IMA2006-031) 9.EG.70 [no]
38. Brizziite (corundum: IMA1993-044) 4.CB.05
  (IUPAC: sodium antimonite)
39. Brochantite (brochantite: IMA1980 s.p., 1824) 7.BB.25
  (IUPAC: tetracopper hexahydro sulfate)
40. Brockite (rhabdophane: IMA1967 s.p., 1962) 8.CJ.45
41. Brodtkorbite (IMA1999-023) 2.BD.55
  (IUPAC: dicopper mercury diselenide)
42. Bromargyrite (IMA1962 s.p., 1849) 3.AA.15
  (IUPAC: silver bromide)
43. Bromellite (Y: 1925) 4.AB.20
  (IUPAC: beryllium(II) oxide)
44. Brontesite (IMA2008-039) 3.AA. [no]
  (IUPAC: triammonium lead pentachloride)
45. Brookite (Y: 1825) 4.DD.10
  (IUPAC: titanium dioxide)
46. Browneite (sphalerite: IMA2012-008) 2.00. [no] [no]
  (IUPAC: manganese sulfide)
47. Brownleeite (silicide: IMA2008-011) 1.BB. [no]
  (IUPAC: manganese silicide)
48. Brownmillerite (brownmillerite, perovskite: IMA1963-017) 4.AC.10
  (IUPAC: dicalcium iron(III) aluminium pentaoxide)
49. Brucite (brucite: 1818) 4.FE.05
  (IUPAC: magnesium dihydroxide)
50. Brüggenite (IMA1970-040) 4.KC.10
  (IUPAC: calcium diiodate monohydrate)
51. Brugnatellite^{Q} (hydrotalcite: 1909) 5.DA.45
52. Brumadoite (tellurium oxysalt: IMA2008-028) 7.C?.
  (IUPAC: tricopper tetrahydro (tetraoxo tellurium(VI)) pentahydrate)
53. Brunogeierite (spinel, ulvöspinel: IMA1972-004 Rd) 9.AC.15
  (IUPAC: diiron(II) tetraoxogermanate(IV))
54. Brushite (gypsum: 1865) 8.CJ.50
  (IUPAC: calcium hydroxophosphate dihydrate)
55. Bubnovaite (aphthitalite: IMA2014-108) 7.AD. [no] [no]
  (IUPAC: dipotassium octasodium calcium hexasulfate)
56. Buchwaldite (IMA1975-041) 8.AD.25
  (IUPAC: sodium calcium phosphate)
57. Buckhornite (buckhornite: IMA1988-022) 2.HB.20b
  (IUPAC: (dilead bismuth trisulfide)(gold ditelluride))
58. Buddingtonite (feldspar: IMA1963-001) 9.FA.30
59. Bukovite (IMA1970-029) 2.BD.30
  (IUPAC: tetracopper dithallium tetraselenide)
60. Bukovskýite (IMA1967-022) 8.DB.40
  (IUPAC: diiron(III) hydro arsenate sulfate heptahydrate)
61. Bulachite (IMA1982-081) 8.DE.15
  (IUPAC: dialuminium trihydro arsenate trihydrate)
62. Bulgakite (astrophyllite, astrophyllite: IMA2014-041) 9.DC. [no] [no]
63. Bultfonteinite (spurrite-afwillite: 1932) 9.AG.80
64. Bunnoite (IMA2014-054) 9.0 [no] [no]
65. Bunsenite (rocksalt, periclase: 1868) 4.AB.25
  (IUPAC: nickel(II) oxide)
66. Burangaite (dufrenite: IMA1976-013) 8.DK.15
  (IUPAC: sodium iron(II) pentaluminium hexahydro tetraphosphate dihydrate)
67. Burbankite (burbankite: 1953) 5.AC.30
68. Burckhardtite (IMA1976-052) 9.EC.70
69. Burgessite (burgessite: IMA2007-055) 8.CB.60
  (IUPAC: dicobalt tetrawater di(hydroxoarsenate) water)
70. Burkeite (Y: 1921) 7.BD.25
  (IUPAC: tetrasodium sulfate carbonate)
71. Burnettite (pyroxene: IMA2013-054) 9.00. [no] [no]
  (CaVAlSiO_{6})
72. Burnsite (IMA2000-050) 4.JG.35
73. Burovaite-Ca (labuntsovite: IMA2008-001) 9.CE.30c [no]
74. Burpalite (wohlerite: IMA1988-036) 9.BE.17
75. Burroite (decavanadate: IMA2016-079) 4.H?. [no] [no]
76. Burtite (perovskite, schoenfliesite: IMA1980-078) 4.FC.10
  (IUPAC: calcium tin(IV) hexahydroxide)
77. Buryatite (ettringite: IMA2000-021) 7.DG.15 [no]
78. Buseckite (wurtzite: IMA2011-070) 2.CB.45 [no] [no]
79. Buserite (IMA1970-024) 4.FL.35 [no] [no]
  (IUPAC: tetrasodium tetradecamanganese heptacosaoxide henicosahydrate)
  Note: it dehydrates to birnessite.
80. Bushmakinite (brackebuschite: IMA2001-031) 8.BG.05 [no]
81. Bussenite (seidozerite, bafertisite: IMA2000-035) 9.BE.65 [no]
82. Bussyite 9.EA.
  1. Bussyite-(Ce) (IMA2007-039) 9.EA.80
  2. Bussyite-(Y) (IMA2014-060) 9.EA. [no]
83. Bustamite (Y: 1826) 9.DG.05
84. Butianite (nuwaite: IMA2016-028) 2.0 [no] [no]
85. Butlerite (Y: 1928) 7.DC.10
  (IUPAC: iron(III) hydro sulfate dihydrate)
86. Bütschliite (Y: 1947) 5.AC.15
  (IUPAC: dipotassium calcium dicarbonate)
87. Buttgenbachite (connellite: 1925) 3.DA.25
88. Byelorussite-(Ce) (joaquinite: IMA1988-042) 9.CE.25
89. Bykovaite (IMA2003-044) 9.BE.55
90. Byrudite (humite: IMA2013-045) 4.CA. [no] [no]
91. Bystrite (cancrinite-sodalite: IMA1990-008) 9.FB.05
92. Byströmite (tapiolite: 1952) 4.DB.10
  (IUPAC: magnesium diantimony(V) hexaoxide)
93. Bytízite (IMA2016-044) 2.0 [no] [no]
  (IUPAC: tricopper antimony triselenide)
94. Byzantievite (IMA2009-001) 9.0 [no] [no]
