= Bunsenite =

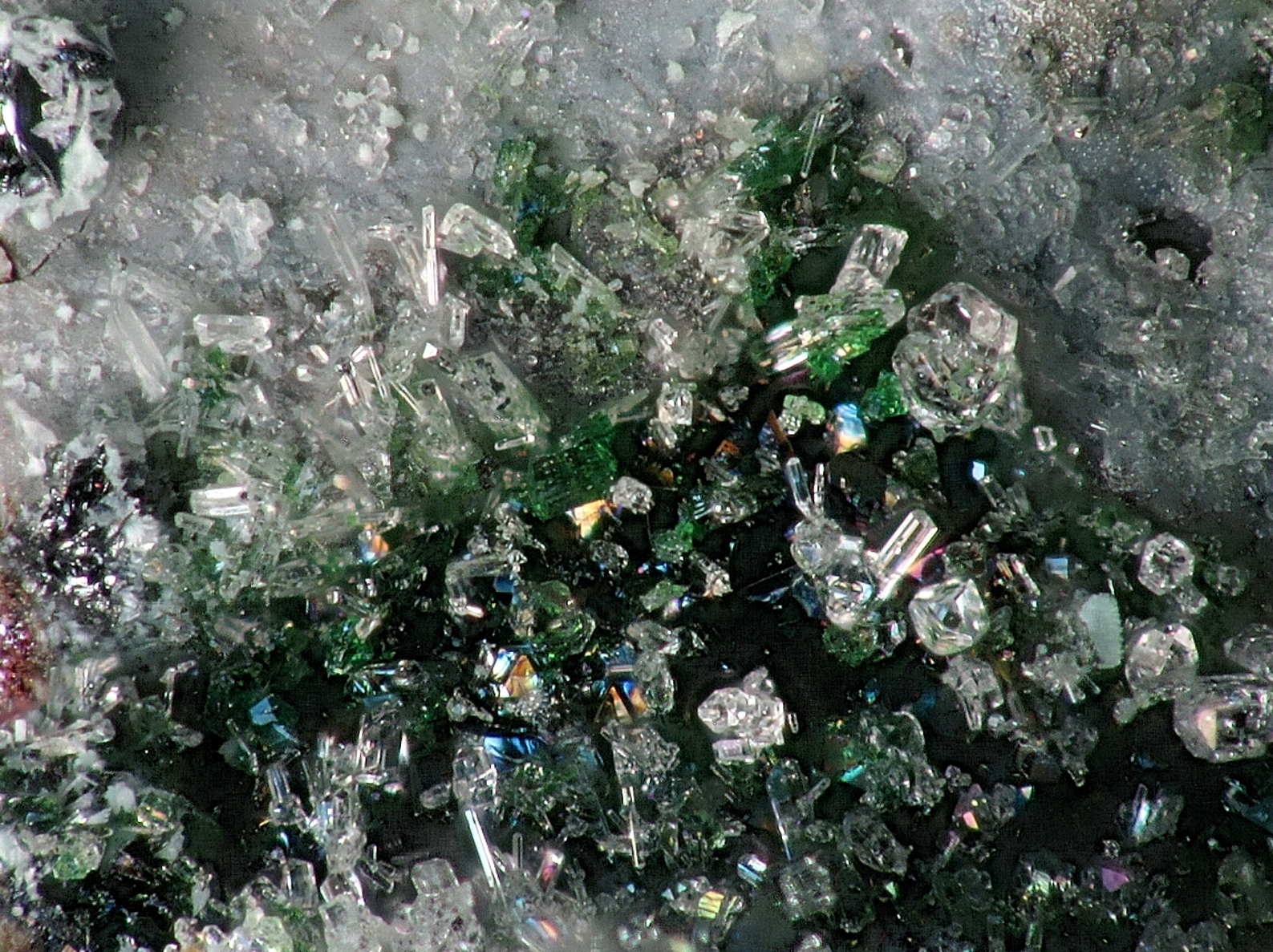
- Bunsenite with unknown colorless crystals from the collection of the „Verein zur Förderung der Lithothek“, Munich (collection number A022658). Field of view 1 mm. Locality: Kochhütte, Helbra, Mansfeld-Südharz, Saxony-Anhalt, Germany

General
- Category: Oxide mineral
- Formula: NiO
- IMA symbol: Bus
- Strunz classification: 4.AB.25
- Crystal system: Cubic
- Crystal class: Hexoctahedral (m3̅m); H–M symbol: (4/m 3̅ 2/m)
- Space group: Fm3̅m
- Unit cell: a = 4.1769 Å; Z = 4

Identification
- Color: Dark pistachio-green
- Crystal habit: Octahedral crystal coatings, also cube or dodecahedron forms
- Twinning: Observed
- Cleavage: None
- Mohs scale hardness: 5.5
- Luster: Vitreous
- Streak: Brownish-black
- Diaphaneity: Transparent
- Specific gravity: 6.898
- Optical properties: Isotropic
- Refractive index: n = 2.37
- Other characteristics: Very high relief

Bunsenite is the naturally occurring form of nickel(II) oxide, NiO. It occurs as rare dark green crystal coatings. It crystallizes in the cubic crystal system and occurs as well formed cubic, octahedral and dodecahedral crystals. It is a member of the periclase group.

It was first described in 1868 for a sample from a hydrothermal nickel–uranium vein from Johanngeorgenstadt, Ore Mountains, Saxony, Germany and named for German chemist Robert Bunsen (1811–1899). Other occurrences include west of the Scotia talc mine near Bon Accord, Barberton district, Transvaal, South Africa and from Kambalda south of Kalgoorlie, Western Australia. The South African occurrence has evidence of thermal metamorphism of a nickel-rich meteorite. It occurs associated with native bismuth, annabergite, aerugite, xanthiosite in Germany; and with liebenbergite, trevorite, nickeloan serpentine, nickeloan ludwigite, violarite, millerite, gaspeite, nimite and bonaccordite in the South African occurrence.
