= Bicchulite =

Tectosilicate mineral

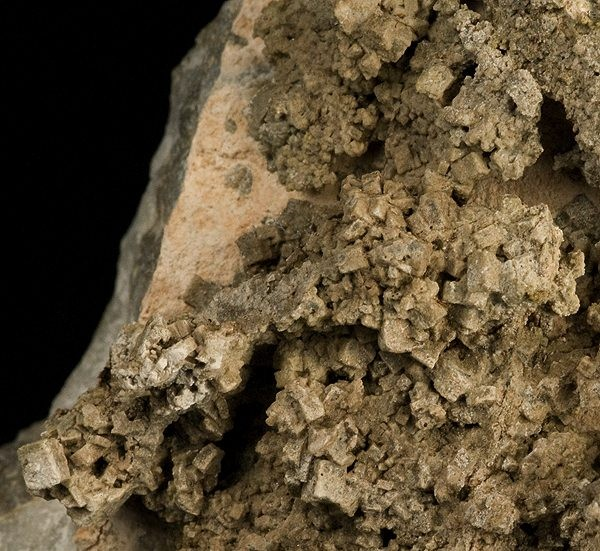
- Sharp, gray, rectangular crystals to 4 mm of bicchulite pseudomorphs after gehlenite crystals richly cover the quartz-rich matrix

General
- Category: Tectosilicate minerals
- Formula: Ca_{2}(Al_{2}SiO_{6})(OH)_{2}
- IMA symbol: Bch
- IMA status: Approved (1973)
- Strunz classification: 9.FB.10
- Dana classification: 76.2.3.5
- Crystal system: Cubic
- Crystal class: Hextetrahedral (4̅3m)
- Space group: I4̅3m (no. 217)

Identification
- Color: White or grey, colorless in thin sections
- Cleavage: Indistinct
- Mohs scale hardness: 2.5
- Luster: Earthy, powdery
- Streak: White
- Diaphaneity: Semitransparent
- Specific gravity: 2.813 (synthetic)

Bicchulite has an ideal chemical formula of 2CaO•Al_{2}O_{2}•SiO_{2}•H_{2}O, which was formularized from the hydrothermal synthesis of synthetic gehlenite (2CaO•Al_{2}O_{3}•SiO_{2}). Also, bicchulite was sighted in the mines of Japan with related minerals. This sodalite-type structured bicchulite has an uncommon ratio of aluminium to silicon, causing difficulties deciphering the structure. Because of bicchulite's structure it has a powdery texture, which leads to complications in obtaining information on the mineral's physical properties. Despite this problem, the color, specific gravity, and crystal size of bicchulite are known. Although bicchulite was only discovered about 40 years ago, technology has been rapidly advancing, allowing more accurate results to be made from experiments done today.

== Composition ==
Considering that bicchulite was found in skarns, the mineral contains various impurities, thus preventing the formation of an absolute chemical formula. Even with the use of X-ray powder diffraction techniques, an accurate composition of bicchulite could not be determined. However, after performing some experiments of hydrating gehlenite, not only was bicchulite created but also an ideal chemical formula for the rare mineral was arranged as 2CaO•Al_{2}O_{3}•SiO_{3}•H_{3}O. Since bicchulite contains aluminium, silicon, and oxygen it is considered an aluminosilicate. At room temperature aluminosilicates typically have a ratio of aluminium to silicon that is close to 1 as a result of alternating linkages of Al and Si ions with O, or Loewenstein's rule. Though bicchulite is an aluminosilicate, it is the only one to have an Al to Si ratio of 2:1 and have a framework structure. Bicchulite is also a sodalite-type mineral not only because of its similar composition components of Na_{6}(Na,Ca)_{2}(Al_{6}Si_{6}O_{24})X_{1−2n}•H_{2}O, but also because of its analogous structure.

== Structure ==
The sodalite family of minerals has a tetrahedral framework structure, with highly charged cations such as Al^{3+} or Si^{4+} connecting through a common O^{2−}. Therefore, bicchulite is considered a sodalite-type structure since it has tetrahedrons consisting of Al, Si, and O. The Al and Si atoms are distributed on the tetrahedral sites while calcium ions and empty (OH)_{4}-tetrahedra occupy the cavities. Additionally, because of bicchulite's sodalite-type framework it contains beta cages, which are known to have a high degree of flexibility, and as a result, the structure can collapse by various mechanisms to accommodate different cations and anions in the beta cage. Since the Al:Si ratio in bicchulite is 2:1, this causes disorder of the Al and Si. Consequently, Al-O-Al linkages with the tetrahedral units occur instead of Al-O-Si which infringes Loewenstein's rule and causes problems for determining the structure of bicchulite.

While trying to verify the structure of bicchulite with a direct program method, unreasonable crystals-chemical features were found. In the end, developed models were established with the use of trial and error and the help of the Patterson function, which maps out the atoms in the lattice to check the developed models. With the process of elimination, only the space group of I4 ̅3m satisfied the correct interatomic distances and the linkages of polyhedra, and was later confirmed by using neutron diffraction.

The structure of the cells of bicchulite was identified to be body centered cubic with the help of X-ray powdered patterns. Moreover, the crystals are cubic form with a point group of 4 ̅3m, thus having an isometric crystal class. Neutron diffraction determined that the bicchulite crystals have a space group of I4 ̅3m with a=8.825 ± 0.001 Å. It was determined that the Al and Si atoms were placed on the tetrahedral sites with oxygen holding them in place. There is also an empty tetrahedron of oxygen atoms in the center of each octahedral group and each is bonded to a hydrogen atom that is on the body diagonals of the cell. With the help of the Patterson function, which determines the crystallography of minerals, calcium atoms and OH groups were seen in the large spaces of bicchulite's framework.

== Geological occurrence ==
Bicchulite is the natural analogue of gehlenite hydrate, therefore gehlenite can decompose into bicchulite, or the processes can be reversed by using hydrothermal methods to turn bicchulite back into gehlenite. Additionally, bicchulite can be formed during the cooling episode of contact metamorphism, where the rock's texture is changed because of exposure to pressure and extreme temperatures from magma, or by metasomatism, which alters the rock chemically by hydrothermal fluids. Bicchulite occurs with vesuvianite (with or without hydrogrossular), gehlenite, and calcite. Furthermore, the bicchulite from the Akagane mine in Iwate Prefecture, Japan contains xanthophyllite and vesuvianite. Bicchulite not only occurs in skarns in the town Bicchu, but also skarns at Carneal, Northern Ireland.
