= Bartelkeite =

Germanate mineral

General
- Category: Germanate mineral
- Formula: PbFeGe(Ge_{2}O_{7})(OH)_{2}•H_{2}O
- IMA symbol: Btk
- Strunz classification: 9.J0.10 (10 ed); 4/C.08-60 (8 ed)
- Dana classification: 7.6.2.1
- Crystal system: Monoclinic
- Crystal class: Spheroidal (2) or prismatic (2/m)
- Space group: P2_{1} or P2_{1}/m
- Unit cell: a = 5.83, b = 13.62, c = 6.31 [Å], β = 127.31° (approximated); Z = 2

Identification
- Color: Colorless, white, very pale greenish
- Crystal habit: tabular; acicular
- Cleavage: {101}, distinct
- Mohs scale hardness: 4
- Luster: Subadamantine
- Streak: White
- Diaphaneity: Transparent
- Density: 4.97
- Optical properties: Biaxal (-)
- Refractive index: nα=1.89, nβ=1.91, nγ=1.91 (approximated)
- 2V angle: ca. 35^{o} (measured)

Bartelkeite is an exceptionally rare mineral, one of scarce natural germanium compounds. The formula was originally assumed to be PbFeGe_{3}O_{8}, bartelkeite was later shown to be isostructural with a high-pressure form of the mineral lawsonite. Thus, its correct formula is PbFeGe(Ge_{2}O_{7})(OH)_{2}•H_{2}O. Bartelkeite and mathewrogersite are minerals with essential (dominant) lead, iron and germanium. Both come from Tsumeb, Namibia - a world's "capital" of germanium minerals.

== Occurrence and association ==
Bartelkeite was detected in voids of germanium ore occurring within dolomites. The mineral associates with galena, germanite, reniérite, and tennantite.

== Crystal structure ==
Bartelkeite is the first analyzed mineral containing both tetrahedrally- and octahedrally-coordinated germanium. It is isostructural with high-pressure form of the silicate lawsonite. In the structure there are:

- chains of FeO_{6} and GeO_{6} octahedra, that share edges
- Ge_{2}O_{7} dimers that cross-link the chains
- Pb atoms and water molecules in large cavities of the framework
