= Baumhauerite =

Rare lead sulfosalt mineral

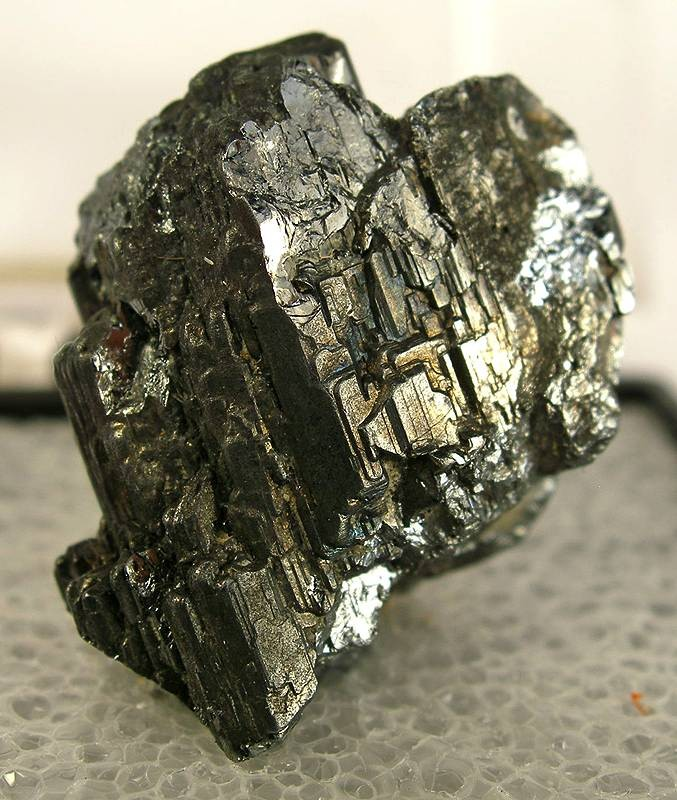
- Baumhauerite from Lengenbach Quarry, Im Feld, Binn Valley, Wallis, Switzerland

General
- Category: Sulfosalt mineral
- Formula: Pb_{3}As_{4}S_{9}
- IMA symbol: Bha
- Strunz classification: 2.HC.05b
- Crystal system: Triclinic
- Crystal class: Pedial (1) (same H-M symbol)
- Space group: P1

Identification
- Color: Gray-black to blue-gray
- Twinning: Polysynthetic, on [100]
- Cleavage: Perfect on [100]
- Fracture: Conchoidal
- Mohs scale hardness: 3
- Luster: Metallic to dull
- Streak: chocolate brown
- Specific gravity: 5.33

Baumhauerite (Pb_{3}As_{4}S_{9}) is a rare lead sulfosalt mineral. It crystallizes in the triclinic system, is gray-black to blue-gray and its lustre is metallic to dull. Baumhauerite has a hardness of 3.

Baumhauerite occurs as small crystals embedded in dolomitic marble. It is found primarily in the Lengenbach Quarry, Binnental, in the Valais region of Switzerland, the mineral is named after German mineralogist Heinrich Adolph Baumhauer (1848–1926), who discovered it at Lengenbach, famous among mineralogists for its array of rare minerals, in 1902. Baumhauerite has also been reported at Sterling Hill, New Jersey, United States, typically in association with molybdenite, and in aggregates at Hemlo, Thunder Bay, Ontario, Canada.

== See also ==
- List of minerals
- List of minerals named after people
