= Bluebellite =

Copper iodate mineral

General
- Category: iodate
- Formula: Cu_{6}[(I^{5+}O_{3})(OH)_{3}](OH)_{7}Cl
- IMA symbol: Bbl
- Crystal system: Trigonal
- Crystal class: Pyramidal (3)
- Space group: R3
- Unit cell: a = 8.3017(5)Å, c = 13.259(1) Å V = 791.4 Å

Identification
- Color: Bright bluish-green
- Cleavage: perfect on (001)
- Fracture: Irregular/Uneven
- Tenacity: Sectile
- Mohs scale hardness: 1
- Luster: Adamantine
- Streak: Pale bluish-green
- Specific gravity: 4.746
- Density: calculated- 4.746g/cm^{3}
- Optical properties: Uniaxial (-) δ = 1.96
- Pleochroism: Visible
- Other characteristics: Very similar to Mojaveite

Bluebellite is a mineral discovered in 2013 in the Blue Bell Mine in the Mojave Desert, California at the same time as the discovery of mojaveite. This mineral was named after its locality, since the Blue Bell Mine claims most of the surrounding area. The only observed forms of this mineral are the {001} and {001}. Bluebellite is known to form bright bluish-green flattened plates or flakes that are range up to 20 x 20 x 5 nm in size, commonly inter-grown in irregular aggregates. Bluebellite and mojaveite are very similar in structure, they are only differentiated by their unique mineral composition.

== Occurrence ==
Bluebellite was discovered within the D-shaft of the Bluebell mine in the Mojave Desert, California. The surrounding rock was composed of very siliceous hornfels along with murdochite, calcite, fluorite, and hemimorphite. This new mineral was discovered along with mojaveite within the Blue Bell area.

== Physical Properties ==
Bluebellite has an adamantine luster and has an overall bright bluish-green color. This sometimes has a dull appearance because of the roughness of the surface. It is very soft, a 1 on the Mohs hardness scale. Bluebellite has a pale blueish-green streak and has an uneven fracture. It has perfect cleavage along the {001} plane.

== Chemical Properties ==
The IMA formula for bluebellite is Cu_{6}(IO_{3})(OH)_{10}Cl but the full chemical formula is Cu_{6}[(I^{5+}O_{3})(OH)_{3}](OH)_{7}Cl. Bluebellite is one of the three currently known copper iodate minerals, the other two are bellingerite and salesite. Mojaveite is similar but each have a unique combination of elements.

== Methods ==
When analyzing bluebellite, single-crystal x-ray studies could not be used because of the poor quality of the crystals. Rigaku R-AXIS Rapid II curved imaging plate microdiffractometer was used to get the data for the powder XRD data. The data obtained was fit into a profile using JADE 2010 software. A JEOL8200 electron microscope was used to get the chemical data for the bluebellite. The electron microscope was a wave-length-dispersive spectroscopy mode, using a 20 nanometer beam.

== X-Ray Powder Diffraction ==
d-spacing	Intensity
4.427	(99)
2.664	(35)
2.516	(100)
2.213	(9)
2.103	(29)
1.899	(47)
1.5663	(48)
1.4788	(29)

== Chemical composition ==
Constituent	wt%	Range
CuO	48.62	4781-50.47
Al_{2}O_{2}3	0.12	0-0.23
SiO_{2}	0.75	0.71-0.83
I_{2}O_{5}	17.26	16.90-17.78
Cl	4.06	3.99-4.14
H_{2}O_{calc}	9.27	-
O=Cl	-0.92	-
Total	79.16	-
