= Bystrite =

Feldspathoid mineral in the cancrinite subgroup

General
- Category: Tectosilicate minerals
- Group: Feldspathoid group, cancrinite group
- Formula: (Na,K)_{7}Ca(Si_{6}Al_{6})O_{24}S_{4.5}•(H_{2}O)
- IMA symbol: Bys
- Strunz classification: 9.FB.05
- Dana classification: 76.02.05.02
- Crystal system: Trigonal
- Crystal class: Ditrigonal pyramidal (3m); H-M symbol: (3m)
- Space group: P31c

Identification
- Color: Yellow
- Crystal habit: Tabular to irregular grains and inclusions
- Cleavage: {101̅0} Good
- Mohs scale hardness: 5
- Luster: Vitreous
- Streak: light yellow
- Diaphaneity: Transparent to translucent
- Specific gravity: 2.43
- Optical properties: Uniaxial (+)
- Refractive index: n_{ω} = 1.584 n_{ε} = 1.660
- Birefringence: δ = 0.076
- Pleochroism: Deep yellow to colorless

Bystrite is a silicate mineral with the formula (Na,K)_{7}Ca(Si_{6}Al_{6})O_{24}S_{4.5}•(H_{2}O), and a member of the cancrinite mineral group. It is a hexagonal crystal, with a 3m point group. The mineral may have been named after the Malaya Bystraya deposits in Russia, where it was found.

Bystrite is a cancrinite mineral and exhibits similar physical properties, composition and structure as other cancrinites.

== Structure ==
Bystrite has a structure that is shared with many of the minerals in the cancrinite group. It exhibits a hexagonal crystal structure with a 3m point group. Bystrite also has a P31c space group. The structure of bystrite could not be easily found due to the mineral exhibiting a strong pseudotranslation, therefore, mineralogists made a model to find out the internal structure of the bystrite mineral, the idea was based on analyzing the tetrahedral frameworks of cancrinite minerals, and it did yield accurate results in predicting the structure of the mineral. Bolotina et al. (2004)

== Geologic occurrence ==
The most studied sample of the mineral was found in the Malaya Bystraya deposit in Russia. Bystrite occurs in lazurite deposits, and is usually associated with lazurite, calcite, and diopside.

The mineral is not very widely spread, either that or it has not been really searched for due to the lack of importance or significance. There is only one bystrite deposit that was mentioned in the literature, and that deposit is found in the Malaya Bystraya lazurite deposit located 25 km (16 mi) to the west of Slyudyanka, and just south of Lake Baikal in Russia.

== Literature survey ==
The first paper addressing Bystrite was by Sapozhnikov, et al. and was originally written in Russian, but mineral data publishing translated most of the important information to English in 2001.
