= Banalsite =

Rare barium feldspar mineral

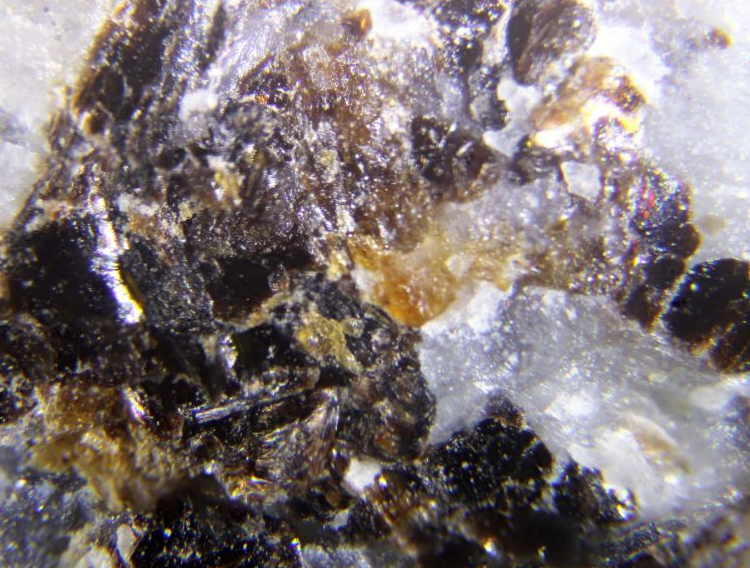
- Banalsite from Sweden (brown) on matrix

General
- Category: Tectosilicate minerals
- Group: Feldspar group
- Formula: BaNa_{2}Al_{4}Si_{4}O_{16}
- IMA symbol: Bns
- IMA status: Grandfathered (1944)
- Strunz classification: 9.FA.60
- Dana classification: 76.1.6.1
- Crystal system: Orthorhombic
- Crystal class: Rhombic pyramidal (mm2)
- Space group: Iba2 (no. 45)
- Unit cell: a = 8.496(2) Å, b = 9.983(2) Å, c = 16.755(3) Å; Z = 4

Identification
- Color: White, brown
- Crystal habit: Rarely showing traces of crystal faces; coarsely crystalline to compact, massive
- Cleavage: Good on {110} and {001}
- Mohs scale hardness: 6.5
- Luster: Vitreous, pearly on cleavage
- Streak: White
- Diaphaneity: Translucent to transparent
- Specific gravity: 3.065
- Optical properties: Biaxial (+)
- Refractive index: n_{α} = 1.570 n_{β} = 1.571 n_{γ} = 1.578
- 2V angle: Measured: 41°, Calculated: 52°

Banalsite is a rare barium, sodium aluminium silicate mineral with formula: BaNa_{2}Al_{4}Si_{4}O_{16}. Banalsite is a tectosilicate of the feldspar group.

Banalsite and its strontium analogue, stronalsite (SrNa_{2}Al_{4}Si_{4}O_{16}), constitute a complete solid solution series. In addition limited solid solution with calcium exists between these and lisetite: CaNa_{2}Al_{4}Si_{4}O_{16}.

It was first described in 1944 for an occurrence in the Benallt Mine, Rhiw, Llanfaelrhys, Lleyn Peninsula, Gwynedd (Caernarvonshire), Wales. The name is derived from the chemical symbols of its composition. It has also been reported from Långban, Värmland, Sweden and from the Kalahari manganese field, Cape Province, South Africa. It has recently been reported from the nepheline syenites of the Zhidoy massif, Eastern Sayan, Siberia, Russia; the Prairie Lake complex of alkaline rocks and carbonatites, Superior Alkaline Province, northwestern Ontario, Canada; the Pilansberg peralkaline complex, South Africa; the Sakharjok alkaline complex in the Kola Alkaline Province, Kola Peninsula of northwestern Russia (the Gremyakha–Vyrmes peralkaline complex, and the Turiy Mys complex of ultramafic–alkaline rocks and carbonatites).
