= Bannisterite =

Phyllosilicate mineral

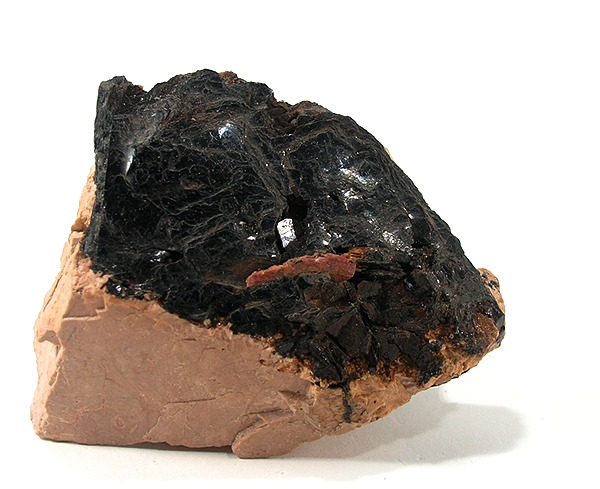

General
- Category: Phyllosilicate minerals
- Formula: (Ca,K,Na)(Mn^{2+},Fe^{2+})_{10}(Si,Al)_{16}O_{38}(OH)_{8} · nH_{2}O n ~ 5.5
- IMA symbol: Ban
- Strunz classification: 9.EG.75
- Dana classification: 74.1.1.4
- Crystal system: Monoclinic
- Crystal class: Prismatic; H-M Symbol: 2/m
- Space group: B2/b
- Unit cell: 8,955.48

Identification
- Color: Dark brown
- Cleavage: Perfect on {001}
- Fracture: Micaceous
- Mohs scale hardness: 4
- Luster: Sub-vitreous, resinous, greasy
- Streak: Creamy white
- Diaphaneity: Translucent
- Specific gravity: 2.83 - 2.84
- Density: 2.83 - 2.84
- Optical properties: Biaxial (-)
- Refractive index: n_{α} = 1.544 - 1.574 n_{β} = 1.586 - 1.611 n_{γ} = 1.589 - 1.612
- Birefringence: 0.045
- Pleochroism: Visible
- 2V angle: 18°- 28°
- Dispersion: Weak to moderate r < v
- Ultraviolet fluorescence: None
- Common impurities: Zn, Na

Bannisterite is a phyllosilicate mineral named in honor of mineralogist and x-ray crystallographer Dr. Frederick Allen Bannister (1901–1970). It is chemically similar to tamaite, a calcium-dominant member of the ganophyllite group. It was previously identified as ganophyllite in 1936, but it is more structurally related to the stilpnomelane group. It was approved by the IMA in 1967.

== Properties ==
Bannisterite grows in flat platy aggregates. It has smooth cleavages without ruling. It is a pleochroic mineral, which is an optical phenomenon. Depending on which axis the mineral is being inspected on, it appears as it changes colors. on the x axis, the mineral is seen in a colorless to pale yellow color. Common impurities include zinc and sodium. It occurs in sulfuric zinc deposits, as well as at silicate-carbonate hosted zinc deposits. It is associated with quartz, baryte, fluorite, rhodonite, sphalerite, galena, calcite, the apophyllite group and the amphibole supergroup. It doesn't have luminescent properties, under long, or shortwave ultraviolet light. It has a type locality in the Benallt mine in Wales, United Kingdom, and in the Franklin mine, New Jersey, United States. It mainly consists of oxygen (44.64%) silicon (21.43%) and manganese (17.95%), but otherwise contains iron (5.23%), zinc (3.68%), aluminum (2.17%), magnesium (1.89%), hydrogen (1.09%), calcium (0.97%), potassium (0.84%) and sodium (0.12%). It is bladed, meaning it has thin lath-like crystals, and is prismatic, meaning the shape of the crystals are slender prisms. It has a barely detectable radioactivity due to it containing potassium. It has a 11.93 radioactivity measured in Gamma Ray American Petroleum Institute units. The concentration of the mineral measured per GRapi units is 8.39%.
