= Billwiseite =

General
- Category: Oxide minerals
- Formula: (Sb^{3+})_{5}(Nb,Ta)_{3}WO_{18}
- IMA symbol: Bwi
- Strunz classification: 4.DX
- Crystal system: Monoclinic
- Crystal class: Prismatic (2/m) (same H-M symbol)
- Space group: C2/c
- Unit cell: a = 54.206(6) Å, b = 4.9163(5) Å, c = 5.5540(6) Å; β = 90.396(2)°; Z = 4

Identification
- Color: Pale yellow (with a tinge of green)
- Cleavage: {100} Indistinct
- Fracture: Hackly
- Mohs scale hardness: 5
- Luster: Vitreous
- Streak: Colorless, very pale yellow
- Specific gravity: 6.33
- Refractive index: unknown

Billwiseite is a very rare oxide mineral found at the pegmatite commonly referred to as "Stak Nala" located within a few hundred yards from the village of Toghla in the Stak Nala, Gilgit-Baltistan, Pakistan. It has only been found as a coating on a single crystal of lepidolite. The sole rock containing Billwiseite is kept at the Royal Ontario Museum, catalogue number M5595.

It contains four relatively uncommon elements: antimony, niobium, tantalum, and tungsten. It is named after William Wise, a mineralogist from the University of California, Santa Barbara.

It was discovered by an international group of geologists, and accepted by the IMA in 2010. Its discovery was announced in Mineralogical Magazine in 2011, and was described in detail in 2012 in The Canadian Mineralogist by Hawthrone et al.
