= Bonaccordite =

Borate mineral

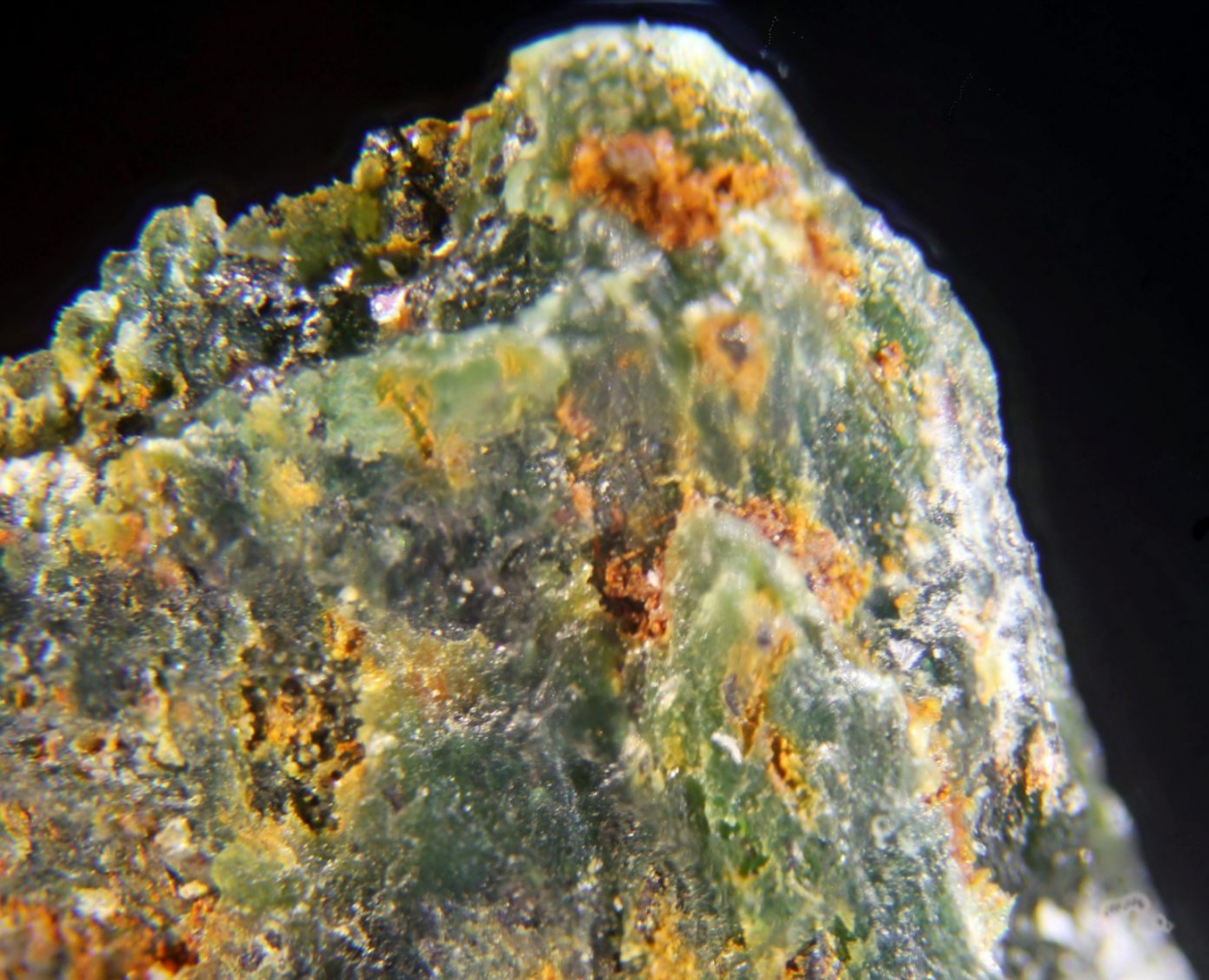
- Bonaccordite (brown) with trevorite (green)

General
- Category: Borates
- Formula: Ni_{2}FeBO_{5}
- IMA symbol: Bna
- Strunz classification: 6.AB.30
- Crystal system: Orthorhombic
- Crystal class: Dipyramidal (mmm); H-M symbol: (2/m 2/m 2/m)
- Space group: Pbam

Identification
- Density: 5.17 g/cm3 (Calculated)

Bonaccordite is a rare mineral discovered in 1974. Its chemical formula is Ni_{2}FeBO_{5} and it is a mineral of the ludwigite group. It usually crystallizes in long, cylindrical prisms that form within another source. It is named after the area of Bon Accord, where it was first found. There have also been findings of bonaccordite within nuclear plants at multiple companies. It builds up a deposit within the machines and is a very hard mineral to clean out because it is resistant to ordinary techniques.

== History ==
Bonaccordite was first described in 1974 for an occurrence in the Bon Accord area, Barberton, Transvaal, South Africa. It occurs in a tabular nickeliferous serpentinite, on the margin of an ultramafic intrusive. The actual site of the bonaccordite finding is a possible meteorite site three kilometers west of the Scotia talc mine.

== Composition ==
The chemical formula for bonaccordite is Ni_{2}FeBO_{5}.

Table 1. Chemical data of bonaccordite
Fe_{2}O	31.9%
NiO	52.7%
MgO	0.5%
MnO	0.04%
CaO	1.5%
SiO_{2}	0.4%
B_{2}O_{3}	13.1%
Total	100.44%

The two analysts confirmed the presence of boron by using wet-chemical analysis.

== Geologic occurrence ==
Bonaccordite can occur as either a cluster of thin, long prisms or rosette-like radiating groups. The prisms can form veins through other minerals and the radiating groups can occur in minerals like liebenbergite or trevorite. Bonaccordite usually occurs along with trevorite, liebenbergite, népouite, nimite, gaspeitev, and millerite in the area of Bon Accord. All of these minerals crystallize as slender prisms.

== Physical properties ==
Bonaccordite is an opaque mineral with a reddish-brown color. In reflected light, the color is grey with a brownish tinge with strong, reddish-brown internal reflections. In many cases, bonaccordite crystallizes into long, slender cylinders. It has been discovered to be the nickel analogue of ludwigite.

The Mohs hardness for bonaccordite is 7 and its density is 5.17 g/cm^{3}. The optical class is biaxial. Bonaccordite has an orthorhombic crystal system with a point group of 2/m 2/m 2/m. The crystals are structured as elongated prisms within another material. There has been no observed cleavages or twinning. Space group has been determined as [Pbam] and cell dimensions were calculated to a = 9.213(6) b = 12.229(7) c = 3.001(2) Z = 4.

Bonaccordite is insoluble and has only shown reactivity to hydrochloric acid. It is very hard to clean it off of fuel rods in nuclear power reactors where it is sometimes formed. It has been shown to form hydrothermally in near-supercritical water at temperatures above 350 °C and in presence of alkaline conditions. Its formation in PWR reactors can be accelerated by lithium produced in ^{10}B(n,α)^{7}Li reaction with boron in coolant. Bonaccordite can be an indicator of Axial-Offset-Anomaly of neutron flux and power density in PWR power plants.
