= Trevorite =

Rare nickel iron oxide mineral

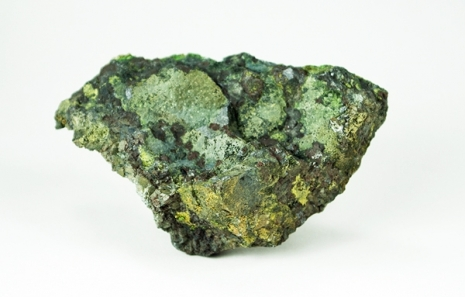
- Pale green nepouite appears to be far richer on this specimen, than the black with a green or brown tint trevorite. It is hard to distinguish the two.

General
- Category: Oxide minerals Spinel group Spinel structural group
- Formula: NiFe^{3+}_{2}O_{4}
- IMA symbol: Trv
- Strunz classification: 4.BB.05
- Dana classification: 7.2.2.5
- Crystal system: Cubic
- Crystal class: Hexoctahedral (m3̅m); H-M symbol: (4/m 3̅ 2/m)
- Space group: Fd3̅m (no. 227)
- Unit cell: a = 8.41 Å; Z = 8

Identification
- Color: Black, greenish hue
- Crystal habit: Granular to massive, rare as minute octahedra
- Cleavage: None
- Fracture: Uneven
- Tenacity: Brittle
- Mohs scale hardness: 5
- Luster: Metallic to sub-metallic
- Streak: Brown
- Diaphaneity: Opaque, transparent in thinnest fragments
- Specific gravity: 5.164
- Refractive index: n = 2.41 (calculated)
- Other characteristics: Highly magnetic

Trevorite is a rare nickel iron oxide mineral belonging to the spinel group. It has the chemical formula NiFe^{3+}_{2}O_{4}. It is a black mineral with the typical spinel properties of crystallising in the cubic system, black streaked, infusible and insoluble in most acids.

There is at least partial solid solution between trevorite and magnetite, with many magnetites from ultramafic rocks containing at least trace amounts of Ni. Fe^{2+} and Mg^{2+} may substitute for Ni in trevorite.

== Discovery and occurrence ==
It was first described for an occurrence in the Bon Accord Nickel Deposit, Bon Accord, Barberton, Mpumalanga, South Africa, in 1921 and was named for Major Tudor Gryffydd Trevor (1865–1954), who was a mining inspector in South Africa.

In the Bon Accord deposit it occurred as a contact deposit between an ultramafic intrusion and a quartzite. In an occurrence at Mount Clifford, Australia, it occurs associated with a nickel sulfide orebody adjacent to a gabbro which intruded peridotite. Associated minerals include nimite, willemseite, nickeloan talc, violarite, millerite, reevesite and goethite at Bon Accord; and with native nickel, heazlewoodite and millerite at Mt. Clifford.

It has also been reported from the Logatchev-1 hydrothermal field on the Mid-Atlantic Ridge; in the Hatrurim Formation in the Negev Desert in Israel; the Josephine Creek District, Josephine County, Oregon and the Gabbs District of Nye County, Nevada.
