= Classification of non-silicate minerals =

List of IMA recognized minerals and groupings

This list gives an overview of the classification of non-silicate minerals and includes mostly International Mineralogical Association (IMA) recognized minerals and its groupings. This list complements the List of minerals recognized by the International Mineralogical Association series of articles and List of minerals. Rocks, ores, mineral mixtures, not IMA approved minerals, not named minerals are mostly excluded. Mostly major groups only, or groupings used by New Dana Classification and Mindat.

== Classification of minerals ==
=== Introduction ===
The grouping of the New Dana Classification and of the mindat.org is similar only, and so this classification is an overview only. Consistency is missing too on the group name endings (group, subgroup, series) between New Dana Classification and mindat.org. Category, class and supergroup name endings are used as layout tools in the list as well.

Abbreviations

- "*" – Mineral not IMA-approved.
- "?" – IMA discredited mineral name.
- "REE" – Rare-earth element (Sc, Y, La, Ce, Pr, Nd, Pm, Sm, Eu, Gd, Tb, Dy, Ho, Er, Tm, Yb, Lu)
- "PGE" – Platinum-group element (Ru, Rh, Pd, Os, Ir, Pt)

=== Category 01 ===
- Elements: Metals and Alloys, Carbides, Silicides, Nitrides, Phosphides
  - Category:Diamond
  - Category:Gold

==== Class: Native elements ====
- Category:Carbide minerals
  - Osbornite group carbides and nitrides
    - Osbornite TiN, Khamrabaevite (Ti,V,Fe)C, Niobocarbide (Nb,Ta)C, Tantalcarbide TaC
- Category:Phosphide minerals
  - Barringerite group phosphides
    - Barringerite (Fe,Ni)_{2}P, Schreibersite (Fe,Ni)_{3}P, Nickelphosphide (Ni,Fe)_{3}P, Allabogdanite (Fe,Ni)_{2}P, Melliniite (Ni,Fe)_{4}P, Monipite MoNiP
- Copper group/ Gold group
  - Gold Au, Silver Ag, Copper Cu, Lead Pb, Aluminium Al, Maldonite Au_{2}Bi
- Silver Amalgam Alloys
  - Amalgam* Ag_{2}Hg_{3}, Moschellandsbergite Ag_{2}Hg_{3}, Schachnerite Ag_{1.1}Hg_{0.9}, Paraschachnerite Ag_{3}Hg_{2}, Luanheite Ag_{3}Hg, Eugenite Ag_{9}Hg_{2}, Weishanite (Au,Ag)_{3}Hg_{2}
- Iron-Nickel group
  - Iron Fe, Kamacite? alpha-(Fe, Ni), Taenite gamma-(Fe, Ni), Tetrataenite FeNi, Awaruite Ni_{2}Fe to Ni_{3}Fe, Nickel Ni, Wairauite CoFe
- Suessite group silicides
  - Suessite (Fe,Ni)_{3}Si, Gupeiite Fe_{3}Si, Xifengite Fe_{5}Si_{3}, Hapkeite Fe_{2}Si, Luobusaite Fe_{0.83}Si_{2}, Mavlyanovite Mn_{5}Si_{3}, Brownleeite MnSi
- Platinum group (Space group Fm3m)
  - Platinum Pt, Iridium (Ir, Os, Ru, Pt), Rhodium (Rh, Pt), Palladium (Pd, Pt)
- Osmium group (Space group P63/mmc)
  - Osmium (Os, Ir), Ruthenium (Ru, Ir, Os), Rutheniridosmine (Ir, Os, Ru), Hexaferrum (Fe, Os, Ru, Ir), Hexamolybdenum (Mo, Ru, Fe, Ir, Os), IMA2008-055 (Ni, Fe, Ir)
- Tetraferroplatinum group (Space group P4/mmm)
  - Tetraferroplatinum PtFe, Tulameenite Pt_{2}FeCu, Ferronickelplatinum Pt_{2}FeNi, Potarite PdHg
- Isoferroplatinum group (Space group Pm3m)
  - Isoferroplatinum (Pt,Pd)_{3}(Fe,Cu), Rustenburgite (Pt,Pd)_{3}Sn, Atokite (Pd,Pt)_{3}Sn, Zvyagintsevite Pd_{3}Pb, Chengdeite Ir_{3}Fe, Yixunite Pt_{3}In
- Arsenic group
  - Arsenic As, Antimony Sb, Stibarsen SbAs, Bismuth Bi, Stistaite SnSb
- Carbon polymorph group (IMA-CNMNC discourages a grouping of diamond and graphite, Mills et al. (2009))
  - Graphite C, Chaoite C, Fullerite C_{60}, (Diamond C, Lonsdaleite C)

=== Category 02 ===
- Sulfides, Sulfosalts, Sulfarsenates, Sulfantimonates, Selenides, Tellurides

==== Class: Sulfide minerals - including Selenides and Tellurides ====
- Chalcocite-Digenite group ([Cu]_{2−x}S formulae)
  - Chalcocite Cu_{2}S, Djurleite Cu_{31}S_{16}, Digenite Cu_{9}S_{5}, Roxbyite Cu_{1.78}S, Anilite Cu_{7}S_{4}, Geerite Cu_{8}S_{5}, Spionkopite Cu_{1.4}S
- Joseite group (Trigonal: R-3m)
  - Joseite Bi_{4}(S,Te)_{3}, Joseite-B Bi_{4}(S,Te)_{3}, Ikunolite Bi_{4}(S,Se)_{3}, Laitakarite Bi_{4}(Se,S)_{3}, Pilsenite Bi_{4}Te_{3}, Poubaite PbBi_{2}Se_{2}(Te,S)_{2}, Rucklidgeite (Bi,Pb)_{3}Te_{4}, Babkinite Pb_{2}Bi_{2}(S,Se)_{3}
- Pentlandite group (Isometric: Fm3m)
  - Pentlandite (Fe,Ni)_{9}S_{8}, Argentopentlandite Ag(Fe,Ni)_{8}S_{8}, Cobaltpentlandite Co_{9}S_{8}, Shadlunite (Pb,Cd)(Fe,Cu)_{8}S_{8}, Manganoshadlunite (Mn,Pb)(Cu,Fe)_{8}S_{8}, Geffroyite (Ag,Cu,Fe)_{9}(Se,S)_{8}
- Galena group (Isometric: Fm3m, IMA-CNMNC discourages the use of this grouping, Mills et al. (2009))
  - Galena PbS, Clausthalite PbSe, Altaite PbTe, Alabandite MnS, Oldhamite (Calcium sulfide) (Ca,Mg,Fe)S, Niningerite (Mg,Fe^{2+},Mn)S, Borovskite Pd_{3}SbTe_{4}, Crerarite (Pt,Pb)Bi_{3}(S,Se)_{4−x} (x~0.7), Keilite (Fe,Mn,Mg,Ca,Cr)S
- Sphalerite group (Isometric: F4-3m)
  - Sphalerite (Zn,Fe)S, Stilleite ZnSe, Metacinnabar HgS, Tiemannite HgSe, Coloradoite HgTe, Hawleyite CdS, Rudashevskyite (Fe,Zn)S
- Wurtzite group (Hexagonal: P63mc)
  - Wurtzite (Zn,Fe)S, Greenockite CdS, Cadmoselite CdSe, Rambergite MnS
- Nickeline group (Hexagonal: P63/mmc)
  - Nickeline NiAs, Breithauptite NiSb, Sederholmite NiSe, Hexatestibiopanickelite (Ni,Pd)(Te,Sb), Sudburyite (Pd,Ni)Sb, Kotulskite Pd(Te,Bi), Sobolevskite PdBi, Stumpflite Pt(Sb,Bi), Langisite (Co,Ni)As, Freboldite CoSe, Achavalite FeSe, Sorosite Cu(Sn,Sb), Vavrinite Ni_{2}SbTe_{2}
- Chalcopyrite group (Tetragonal: I-42d)
  - Chalcopyrite CuFeS_{2}, Eskebornite CuFeSe_{2}, Gallite CuGaS_{2}, Roquesite CuInS_{2}, Lenaite AgFeS_{2}, Laforetite AgInS_{2}
- Stannite group (Tetragonal: I-42m) A_{2}BCS type
  - Stannite Cu_{2}FeSnS_{4}, Cernyite Cu_{2}CdSnS_{4}, Briartite Cu_{2}(Zn,Fe)GeS_{4}, Kuramite Cu_{3}SnS_{4}, Sakuraiite (Cu,Zn,Fe,In,Sn)_{4}S_{4}, Hocartite Ag_{2}FeSnS_{4}, Pirquitasite Ag_{2}ZnSnS_{4}, Velikite Cu_{2}HgSnS_{4}, Kesterite Cu_{2}(Zn,Fe)SnS_{4}, Ferrokesterite Cu_{2}(Fe,Zn)SnS_{4}, Barquillite Cu_{2}CdGeS_{4}
- Thiospinel group, AB_{2}X_{4} (Isometric: Fd3m)
  - Bornhardtite Co^{2+}(Co^{3+})_{2}Se_{4}, Cadmoindite CdIn_{2}S_{4}, Carrollite Cu(Co,Ni)_{2}S_{4}, Cuproiridsite CuIr_{2}S_{4}, Cuprorhodsite CuRh_{2}S_{4}, Daubréelite Fe^{2+}Cr_{2}S_{4}, Ferrorhodsite (Fe,Cu)(Rh,Ir,Pt)_{2}S_{4}, Fletcherite (mineral) Cu(Ni,Co)_{2}S_{4}, Florensovite Cu(Cr_{1.5}Sb_{0.5})S_{4}, Greigite Fe^{2+}(Fe^{3+})_{2}S_{4}, Indite Fe^{2+}In_{2}S_{4}, Kalininite ZnCr_{2}S_{4}, Linnaeite Co^{2+}(Co^{3+})_{2}S_{4}, Malanite Cu(Pt,Ir)_{2}S_{4}, Polydymite Ni^{2+}Ni^{3+}_{2}S_{4}, Siegenite (Ni,Co)_{3}S_{4}, Violarite Fe^{2+}(Ni^{3+})_{2}S_{4}, Trustedtite Ni_{3}Se_{4}, Tyrrellite (Cu,Co,Ni)_{3}Se_{4}
- Tetradymite group (Trigonal: R-3m)
  - Tetradymite Bi_{2}Te_{2}S, Tellurobismuthite Bi_{2}Te_{3}, Tellurantimony Sb_{2}Te_{3}, Paraguanajuatite Bi_{2}(Se,S)_{3}, Kawazulite Bi_{2}>(Te,Se,S)_{3}, Skippenite Bi_{2}Se_{2}(Te,S), Vihorlatite Bi_{24}Se_{17}Te_{4}
- Pyrite group (Isometric: Pa3)
  - Pyrite FeS_{2}, Vaesite NiS_{2}, Cattierite CoS_{2}, Penroseite (Ni,Co,Cu)Se_{2}, Trogtalite CoSe_{2}, Villamaninite (Cu,Ni,Co,Fe)S_{2}, Fukuchilite Cu_{3}FeS_{8}, Krutaite CuSe_{2}, Hauerite MnS_{2}, Laurite RuS_{2}, Aurostibite AuSb_{2}, Krutovite NiAs_{2}, Sperrylite PtAs_{2}, Geversite Pt(Sb,Bi)_{2}, Insizwaite Pt(Bi,Sb)_{2}, Erlichmanite OsS_{2}, Dzharkenite FeSe_{2}, Gaotaiite Ir_{3}Te_{8}, Mayingite IrBiTe
- Marcasite group (Orthorhombic: Pnnm)
  - Marcasite FeS_{2}, Ferroselite FeSe_{2}, Frohbergite FeTe_{2}, Hastite? CoSe_{2}, Mattagamite CoTe_{2}, Kullerudite NiSe_{2}, Omeiite (Os,Ru)As_{2}, Anduoite (Ru,Os)As_{2}, Lollingite FeAs_{2}, Seinajokite (Fe,Ni)(Sb,As)_{2}, Safflorite (Co,Fe)As_{2}, Rammelsbergite NiAs_{2}, Nisbite NiSb_{2}
- Cobaltite group (Cubic or pseudocubic crystals)
  - Cobaltite CoAsS, Gersdorffite NiAsS, Ullmannite NiSbS, Willyamite (Co,Ni)SbS, Tolovkite IrSbS, Platarsite (Pt,Rh,Ru)AsS, Irarsite (Ir,Ru,Rh,Pt)AsS, Hollingworthite (Rh,Pt,Pd)AsS, Jolliffeite (Ni,Co)AsSe, Padmaite PdBiSe, Michenerite (Pd,Pt)BiTe, Maslovite PtBiTe, Testibiopalladite PdTe(Sb,Te), Changchengite IrBiS, Milotaite PdSbSe, Kalungaite PdAsSe
- Arsenopyrite group (Monoclinic: P21/c (Pseudo-orthorhombic))
  - Arsenopyrite FeAsS, Gudmundite FeSbS, Osarsite (Os,Ru)AsS, Ruarsite RuAsS, Iridarsenite (Ir,Ru)As_{2}, Clinosafflorite (Co,Fe,Ni)As_{2}
- Molybdenite group
  - Drysdallite Mo(Se,S)_{2}, Molybdenite MoS_{2}, Tungstenite WS_{2}
- Skutterudite group
  - Ferroskutterudite (Fe,Co)As_{3}; Nickelskutterudite NiAs_{2−3}; Skutterudite (Co,Fe,Ni)As_{2−3}; Kieftite CoSb_{3}

==== Class: Sulfosalt minerals ====
- Colusite group
  - Colusite Cu_{12−13}V(As,Sb,Sn,Ge)_{3}S_{16}, Germanocolusite Cu_{13}V(Ge,As)_{3}S_{16}, Nekrasovite Cu^{+}_{26}V_{2}(Sn,As,Sb)_{6}S_{32}, Stibiocolusite Cu_{13}V(Sb,As,Sn)_{3}S_{16}
- Cylindrite group
  - Cylindrite Pb_{3}Sn_{4}FeSb_{2}S_{14}, Franckeite (Pb,Sn)_{6}Fe^{2+}Sn_{2}Sb_{2}S_{14}, Incaite Pb_{4}Sn_{4}FeSb_{2}S_{15}, Potosiite Pb_{6}Sn_{2}FeSb_{2}S_{14}, Abramovite Pb_{2}SnInBiS_{7}, Coiraite (Pb,Sn)_{12.5}As_{3}Sn_{5}FeS_{28}
- Hauchecornite group (Tetragonal: P4/nnn or I4/mmm)
  - Hauchecornite Ni_{9}Bi(Sb,Bi)S_{8}, Bismutohauchecornite Ni_{9}Bi_{2}S_{8}, Tellurohauchecornite Ni_{9}BiTeS_{8}, Arsenohauchecornite Ni_{18}Bi_{3}AsS_{16}, Tucekite Ni_{9}Sb_{2}S_{8}
- Tetrahedrite group (Isometric: I-43m)
  - Tetrahedrite (Cu,Fe)_{12}Sb_{4}S_{13}, Tennantite (Cu,Fe)_{12}As_{4}S_{13}, Freibergite (Ag,Cu,Fe)_{12}(Sb,As)_{4}S_{13}, Hakite (Cu,Hg)_{3}(Sb,As)(Se,S)_{3}, Giraudite (Cu,Zn,Ag)_{12}(As,Sb)_{4}(Se,S)_{13}, Goldfieldite Cu_{12}(Te,Sb,As)_{4}S_{13}, Argentotennantite (Ag,Cu)_{10}(Zn,Fe)_{2}(As,Sb)_{4}S_{13}
- Proustite group
  - Proustite Ag_{3}AsS_{3}, Pyrargyrite Ag_{3}SbS_{3}
- Aikinite group (Orthorhombic containing Pb, Cu, Bi, and S)
  - Aikinite PbCuBiS_{3}, Krupkaite PbCuBi_{3}S_{6}, Gladite PbCuBi_{5}S_{9}, Hammarite Pb_{2}Cu_{2}Bi_{4}S_{9} (?), Friedrichite Pb_{5}Cu_{5}Bi_{7}S_{18}, Pekoite PbCuBi_{11}(S,Se)_{18}, Lindstromite Pb_{3}Cu_{3}Bi_{7}S_{15}, Salzburgite Cu_{1.6}Pb_{1.6}Bi_{6.4}S_{12}
- Lillianite group (Orthorhombic, A_{m}B_{n}S_{6} where A=Pb, Ag, Mn and B=Sb, Bi)
  - Lillianite Pb_{3}Bi_{2}S_{6}, Bursaite? Pb_{5}Bi_{4}S_{11}, Gustavite PbAgBi_{3}S_{6} (?), Andorite PbAgSb_{3}S_{6}, Uchucchacuaite AgPb_{3}MnSb_{5}S_{12}, Ramdohrite Ag_{3}Pb_{6}Sb_{11}S_{24}, Roshchinite Ag_{19}Pb_{10}Sb_{51}S_{96} or Pb(Ag,Cu)_{2}(Sb,As)_{5}S_{10}, Fizelyite Pb_{14}Ag_{5}Sb_{21}S_{48}
- Matildite group
  - Matildite AgBiS_{2}, Bohdanowiczite AgBiSe_{2}, Volynskite AgBiTe_{2}, Zlatogorite CuNiSb_{2}
- Sartorite group
  - Sartorite PbAs_{2}S_{4}, Guettardite Pb(Sb,As)_{2}S_{4}, Twinnite Pb(Sb,As)_{2}S_{4}, Marumoite Pb_{32}As_{40}S_{92}
- Pavonite group (Monoclinic: C/2c bismuth sulfosalts)
  - Pavonite (Ag,Cu)(Bi,Pb)_{3}S_{5}, Makovickyite Ag_{1.5}Bi_{5.5}S_{9}, Benjaminite (Ag,Cu)_{3}(Bi,Pb)_{7}S_{12}, Mummeite Cu_{0.58}Ag_{3.11}Pb_{1.10}Bi_{6.65}S_{13}, Borodaevite Ag_{5}(Bi,Sb)_{9}S_{16}, Cupropavonite AgPbCu_{2}Bi_{5}S_{10}, Cupromakovickyite Cu_{4}AgPb_{2}Bi_{9}S_{18}, Kudriavite (Cd,Pb)Bi_{2}S_{4}, IMA2008-058 Ag_{5}Bi_{13}S_{22}, IMA2005-036 Cu_{8}Pb_{4}Ag_{3}Bi_{19}S_{38}

=== Category 03 ===
- Halogenides, Oxyhalides, Hydroxyhalides
  - Atacamite group
    - Polymorths of Cu_{2}(OH)_{3}Cl: Atacamite, Botallackite, Clinoatacamite, Paratacamite
    - Gillardite Cu_{3}Ni(OH)_{6}Cl_{2}, Haydeeite Cu_{3}Mg(OH)_{6}Cl_{2}, Herbertsmithite Cu_{3}Zn[(OH)_{3}Cl]_{2}, Kapellasite Cu_{3}Zn[(OH)_{3}Cl]_{2}
  - Fluorite group
    - Fluorite CaF_{2}, Fluorocronite PbF_{2}, Frankdicksonite BaF_{2}, Tveitite-(Y) Ca_{1−x}Y_{x}F_{2+x} (x~0.3), IMA2009-014 SrF_{2}
  - Halite group (IMA-CNMNC discourages the use of this grouping, Mills et al. (2009))
    - Halite NaCl, Sylvite KCl, Villiaumite NaF, Carobbiite KF, Griceite LiF
  - Chlorargyrite group
    - Bromargyrite AgBr, Chlorargyrite AgCl, Marshite CuI, Miersite (Ag,Cu)I, Nantokite CuCl
  - Lawrencite group
    - Chloromagnesite MgCl_{2}, Lawrencite (Fe^{2+},Ni)Cl_{2}, Scacchite MnCl_{2}, Tolbachite CuCl_{2}
  - Matlockite group
    - Bismoclite (BiO)Cl, Daubréeite (BiO)(OH,Cl), Laurionite PbCl(OH), Paralaurionite PbCl(OH), Rorisite CaFCl, Zavaritskite (BiO)F, Matlockite PbFCl
  - Challacolloite group
    - Challacolloite KPb_{2}Cl_{5}, Hephaistosite TlPb_{2}Cl_{5}, Steropesite Tl_{3}BiCl_{6}, Panichiite (NH_{4})_{2}SnCl_{6}
  - Chukhrovite group
    - Chukhrovite-(Y) Ca_{3}(Y,Ce)Al_{2}(SO_{4})F_{13}·10H_{2}O, Chukhrovite-(Ce) Ca_{3}(Ce,Y)Al_{2}(SO_{4})F_{13}·10H_{2}O, Meniaylovite Ca_{4}AlSi(SO_{4})F_{13}·12H_{2}O, Chukhrovite-(Nd) Ca_{3}(Nd,Y)Al_{2}(SO_{4})F_{13}·12H_{2}O

=== Category 04 ===
- Oxides and Hydroxides, Vanadates, Arsenites, Antimonites, Bismuthites, Sulfites, Iodates
  - Category:Vanadate minerals
  - Periclase group (Isometric: Fm3m, IMA-CNMNC discourages the use of this grouping, Mills et al. (2009))
    - Periclase MgO, Bunsenite NiO, Manganosite MnO, Monteponite CdO, Lime CaO, Wustite FeO, Hongquiite^{*} TiO
  - Hematite group/ Corundum group (Rhombohedral: R-3c)
    - Corundum Al_{2}O_{3} (Sapphire, Ruby), Eskolaite Cr_{2}O_{3}, Hematite Fe_{2}O_{3}, Karelianite V_{2}O_{3}, Tistarite Ti_{2}O_{3}
  - Perovskite group
    - Perovskite CaTiO_{3}, Latrappite (Ca,Na)(Nb,Ti,Fe)O_{3}, Loparite-(Ce) (Ce,Na,Ca)_{2}(Ti,Nb)_{2}O_{6}, Lueshite NaNbO_{3}, Tausonite SrTiO_{3}, Isolueshite (Na,La,Ca)(Nb,Ti)O_{3}, Barioperovskite BaTiO_{3}, Lakargiite CaZrO_{3}
  - Ilmenite group
    - Ilmenite Fe^{2+}TiO_{3}, Geikielite MgTiO_{3}, Pyrophanite MnTiO_{3}, Ecandrewsite (Zn,Fe^{2+},Mn^{2+})TiO_{3}, Melanostibite Mn(Sb^{5+},Fe^{3+})O_{3}, Brizziite-III NaSb^{5+}O_{3}, Akimotoite (Mg,Fe)SiO_{3}
  - Rutile group (Tetragonal: P4/mnm)
    - Rutile TiO_{2}, Ilmenorutile (Ti,Nb,Fe^{3+})O_{2}, Struverite? (Ti,Ta,Fe^{3+})O_{2}, Pyrolusite MnO_{2}, Cassiterite SnO_{2}, Plattnerite PbO_{2}, Argutite GeO_{2}, Squawcreekite? (Fe^{3+},Sb^{5+},W^{6+})O_{4}·H_{2}O
  - Multiple Oxides with O_{19} groups/ Magnetoplumbite group
    - Hibonite (Ca,Ce)(Al,Ti,Mg)_{12}O_{19}, Yimengite K(Cr,Ti,Fe,Mg)_{12}O_{19}, Hawthorneite Ba[Ti_{3}Cr_{4}Fe_{4}Mg]O_{19}, Magnetoplumbite Pb(Fe^{3+},Mn^{3+})_{12}O_{19}, Haggertyite Ba[(Fe^{2+})_{6}Ti_{5}Mg]O_{19}, Nezilovite PbZn_{2}(Mn^{4+},Ti^{4+})_{2}(Fe^{3+})_{8}O_{19}, Batiferrite Ba(Ti_{2}(Fe^{3+})_{8}(Fe^{2+})_{2})O_{19}, Barioferrite Ba(Fe^{3+})_{12}O_{19}, Plumboferrite Pb_{2}(Fe^{3+})_{11−x}(Mn^{2+})_{x}O_{19−2x} x = 1/3, IMA2009-027 (Fe,Mg)Al_{12}O_{19}
  - Cryptomelane group (Hard black, fine-grained)
    - Hollandite Ba(Mn^{4+},Mn^{2+})_{8}O_{16}, Cryptomelane K(Mn^{4+},Mn^{2+})_{8}O_{16}, Manjiroite (Na,K)(Mn^{4+},Mn^{2+})_{8}O_{16}·nH_{2}O, Coronadite Pb(Mn^{4+},Mn^{2+})_{8}O_{16}, Strontiomelane Sr(Mn^{4+})_{6}Mn^{3+}_{2}O_{16}, Henrymeyerite BaFe^{2+}Ti_{7}O_{16}
  - Aeschynite group
    - Aeschynite-(Ce) (Ce,Ca,Fe)(Ti,Nb)_{2}(O,OH)_{6}, Nioboaeschynite-(Ce) (Ce,Ca)(Nb,Ti)_{2}(O,OH)_{6}, Aeschynite-(Y) (Y,Ca,Fe)(Ti,Nb)_{2}(O,OH)_{6}, Tantalaeschynite-(Y) (Y,Ce,Ca)(Ta,Ti,Nb)_{2}O_{6}, Aeschynite-(Nd) (Nd,Ce)(Ti,Nb)_{2}(O,OH)_{6}, Nioboaeschynite-(Nd) (Nd,Ce)(Nb,Ti)_{2}(O,OH)_{6}, Nioboaeschynite-(Y) [(Y,REE),Ca,Th,Fe](Nb,Ti,Ta)_{2}(O,OH)_{6}
  - Crichtonite group (ABC_{18}T_{2}O_{38})
    - Landauite NaMnZn_{2}(Ti,Fe^{3+})_{6}Ti_{12}O_{38}, Loveringite (Ca,Ce)(Ti,Fe^{3+},Cr,Mg)_{21}O_{38}, Crichtonite (Sr,La,Ce,Y)(Ti,Fe^{3+},Mn)_{21}O_{38}, Senaite Pb(Ti,Fe,Mn)_{21}O_{38}, Davidite-(La) (La,Ce,Ca)(Y,U)(Ti,Fe^{3+})_{20}O_{38}, Davidite-(Ce) (Ce,La)(Y,U)(Ti,Fe^{3+})_{20}O_{38}, Mathiasite (K,Ca,Sr)(Ti,Cr,Fe,Mg)_{21}O_{38}, Lindsleyite (Ba,Sr)(Ti,Cr,Fe,Mg)_{21}O_{38}, Dessauite (Sr,Pb)(Y,U)(Ti,Fe^{3+})_{20}O_{38}, Cleusonite Pb(U^{4+},U^{6+})(Ti,Fe^{2+},Fe^{3+})_{20}(O,OH)_{38}, Gramaccioliite-(Y) (Pb,Sr)(Y,Mn)Fe_{2}(Ti,Fe)_{18}O_{38}

==== Spinel group ====
- AB_{2}O_{4}
  - Aluminum subgroup
    - Spinel MgAl_{2}O_{4}, Galaxite (Mn,Mg)(Al,Fe^{3+})_{2}O_{4}, Hercynite Fe^{2+}Al_{2}O_{4}, Gahnite ZnAl_{2}O_{4}
  - Iron subgroup
    - Magnesioferrite MgFe^{3+}_{2}O_{4}, Jacobsite (Mn^{2+},Fe^{2+},Mg)(Fe^{3+},Mn^{3+})_{2}O_{4}, Magnetite Fe^{2+}(Fe^{3+})_{2}O_{4}, Franklinite (Zn,Mn^{2+},Fe^{2+})(Fe^{3+},Mn^{3+})_{2}O_{4}, Trevorite Ni(Fe^{3+})_{2}O_{4}, Cuprospinel (Cu,Mg)(Fe^{3+})_{2}O_{4}, Brunogeierite (Ge^{2+},Fe^{2+})(Fe^{3+})_{2}O_{4}
  - Chromium subgroup
    - Magnesiochromite MgCr_{2}O_{4}, Manganochromite (Mn,Fe^{2+})(Cr,V)_{2}O_{4}, Chromite Fe^{2+}Cr_{2}O_{4}, Nichromite (Ni,Co,Fe^{2+})(Cr,Fe^{3+},Al)_{2}O_{4}, Cochromite (Co,Ni,Fe^{2+})(Cr,Al)_{2}O_{4}, Zincochromite ZnCr_{2}O_{4}
  - Vanadium subgroup
    - Vuorelainenite (Mn^{2+},Fe^{2+})(V^{3+},Cr^{3+})_{2}O_{4}, Coulsonite Fe^{2+}(V^{3+})_{2}O_{4}, Magnesiocoulsonite Mg(V^{3+})_{2}O_{4}
  - Titanium subgroup
    - Qandilite (Mg,Fe^{2+})_{2}(Ti,Fe^{3+},Al)O_{4}, Ulvospinel Ti(Fe^{2+})_{2}O_{4}
  - Taaffeite group
    - Magnesiotaaffeite-2N2S Mg_{3}Al_{8}BeO_{16}, Magnesiotaaffeite-6N3S (Mg,Fe^{2+},Zn)_{2}Al_{6}BeO_{12}, Ferrotaaffeite-6N3S (Fe^{2+},Zn,Mg)_{2}Al_{6}BeO_{12}
  - Kusachiite CuBi_{2}O_{4}, Iwakiite Mn^{2+}(Fe^{3+},Mn^{3+})_{2}O_{4}, Hausmannite Mn^{2+}(Mn^{3+})_{2}O_{4}, Hetaerolite Zn(Mn^{3+})_{2}O_{4}, Hydrohetaerolite Zn_{2}(Mn^{3+})_{4}O_{8}·H_{2}O, Minium (Pb^{2+})_{2}Pb^{4+}O_{4}, Chrysoberyl BeAl_{2}O_{4}, Marokite Ca(Mn^{3+})_{2}O_{4}, Filipstadite (Mn^{2+},Mg)_{4}Sb^{5+}Fe^{3+}O_{8}, Tegengrenite (Mg,Mn^{2+})_{2}(Sb^{5+})_{0.5}(Mn^{3+},Si,Ti)_{0.5}O_{4}, Yafsoanite Ca_{3}Te_{2}Zn_{3}O_{12}, Xieite FeCr_{2}O_{4}

==== Nickel-Strunz 04.DH mineral family ====
IMA/CMNMC revised the Pyrochlore supergroup 2010.

- Pyrochlore supergroup
  - Pyrochlore group (D atom is Nb)
    - Fluorcalciopyrochlore (Ca,☐)_{2}Nb_{2}(O,OH)_{6}F, Fluorkenopyrochlore (☐,Na,Ce,Ca)_{2}(Nb,Ti)_{2}O_{6}F, Fluornatropyrochlore (Na,REE,Ca)_{2}Nb_{2}(O,OH)_{6}F, Fluorstrontiopyrochlore (Sr,☐)_{2}Nb_{2}(O,OH)_{6}F, Hydropyrochlore (H_{2}O,☐)_{2}Nb_{2}(O,OH)_{6}(H_{2}O), Hydroxycalciopyrochlore (Ca,☐)_{2}Nb_{2}(O,OH)_{6}(OH), Kenoplumbopyrochlore (Pb,☐)Nb_{2}O_{6}(☐,O), Oxycalciopyrochlore Ca_{2}Nb_{2}O_{6}O, Oxynatropyrochlore (Na,Ca,U)_{2}Nb_{2}O_{6}(O,OH), Oxyplumbopyrochlore Pb_{2}Nb_{2}O_{6}O, Oxyyttropyrochlore-(Y) (Y,☐)_{2}Nb_{2}O_{6}O
  - Microlite group (D atom is Ta)
    - Fluorcalciomicrolite (Ca,Na)_{2}Ta_{2}O_{6}F, Fluornatromicrolite (Na,Ca,Bi)_{2}Ta_{2}O_{6}F, Hydrokenomicrolite (☐,H_{2}O)_{2}Ta_{2}(O,OH)_{6}H_{2}O, Hydromicrolite (H_{2}O,☐)_{2}Ta_{2}(O,OH)_{6}H_{2}O, Hydroxykenomicrolite (☐,Na,Sb^{3+})_{2}Ta_{2}O_{6}(OH), Kenoplumbomicrolite (Pb,☐)_{2}Ta_{2}O_{6}(☐,O,OH), Oxycalciomicrolite Ca_{2}Ta_{2}O_{6}O, Oxystannomicrolite Sn_{2}Ta_{2}O_{6}O, Oxystibiomicrolite (Sb^{3+},Ca)_{2}Ta_{2}O_{6}O
  - Romeite group (D atom is Sb)
    - Cuproromeite Cu_{2}Sb_{2}(O,OH)_{7}, Fluorcalcioromeite (Ca,Sb^{3+})_{2}(Sb^{5+},Ti)_{2}O_{6}F, Fluornatroromeite (Na,Ca)_{2}Sb_{2}(O,OH)_{6}F, Hydroxycalcioromeite (Ca,Sb^{3+})_{2}(Sb^{5+},Ti)_{2}O_{6}(OH), Oxycalcioromeite Ca_{2}Sb_{2}O_{6}O, Oxyplumboromeite Pb_{2}Sb_{2}O_{6}O, Stibiconite Sb^{3+}Sb^{+6}_{2}O_{6}(OH)
  - Betafite group (D atom is Ti): Calciobetafite Ca_{2}(Ti,Nb)_{2}O_{6}O, Oxyuranobetafite (U,Ca,☐)_{2}(Ti,Nb)_{2}O_{6}O
  - Elsmoreite group (D atom is W): Hydrokenoelsmoreite ☐_{2}W_{2}O_{6}(H_{2}O)
- Cesstibtantite group
  - Cesstibtantite (Cs,Na)SbTa_{4}O_{12}, Natrobistantite (Na,Cs)Bi(Ta,Nb,Sb)_{4}O_{12}
- Brannerite-Thorutite series, Orthobrannerite-Thorutite series:
  - Brannerite (U^{4+},REE,Th,Ca)(Ti,Fe^{3+},Nb)_{2}(O,OH)_{6}, Orthobrannerite U^{4+}U^{6+}Ti_{4}O_{12}(OH)_{2}, Thorutite (Th,U,Ca)Ti_{2}(O,OH)_{6}

==== Class: Hydroxides and oxides containing hydroxyl ====
- Diaspore group (Orthorhombic, Pnma or Pnmd)
  - Diaspore AlO(OH), Goethite Fe^{3+}O(OH), Groutite Mn^{3+}O(OH), Montroseite (V^{3+},Fe^{3+},V^{4+})O(OH), Bracewellite Cr^{3+}O(OH), Tsumgallite GaO(OH)
- Brucite group (Rhombohedral: P-3m1)
  - Brucite Mg(OH)_{2}, Amakinite (Fe^{2+},Mg)(OH)_{2}, Pyrochroite Mn(OH)_{2}, Portlandite Ca(OH)_{2}, Theophrastite Ni(OH)_{2}
- Wickmanite group
  - (Cubic or Trigonal, 2^{+} cations containing Sn)
    - Wickmanite Mn^{2+}Sn^{4+}(OH)_{6}, Schoenfliesite MgSn^{4+}(OH)_{6}, Natanite Fe^{2+}Sn^{4+}(OH)_{6}, Vismirnovite ZnSn^{4+}(OH)_{6}, Burtite CaSn(OH)_{6}, Mushistonite (Cu,Zn,Fe)Sn^{4+}(OH)_{6}
  - (Tetragonal: P42/n)
    - Stottite Fe^{2+}Ge(OH)_{6}, Tetrawickmanite Mn^{2+}Sn^{4+}(OH)_{6}, Jeanbandyite (Fe^{3+},Mn^{2+})Sn^{4+}(OH)_{6}, Mopungite NaSb(OH)_{6}

=== Category 05 ===
- Carbonates and Nitrates
  - Calcite group (Trigonal: R-3c)
    - Calcite CaCO_{3}, Magnesite MgCO_{3}>, Siderite Fe^{2+}CO_{3}, Rhodochrosite MnCO_{3}, Spherocobaltite CoCO_{3}, Smithsonite ZnCO_{3}, Otavite CdCO_{3}, Gaspeite (Ni,Mg,Fe^{2+})CO_{3}
  - Aragonite group (Orthorhombic: Pmcn)
    - Aragonite CaCO_{3}, Witherite BaCO_{3}, Strontianite SrCO_{3}, Cerussite PbCO_{3}
  - Dolomite group
    - Ankerite Ca(Fe^{2+},Mg,Mn^{2+})(CO_{3})_{2}, Dolomite CaMg(CO_{3})_{2}, Kutnohorite Ca(Mn,Mg,Fe)(CO_{3})_{2}, Minrecordite CaZn(CO_{3})_{2}
  - Burbankite group
    - Hexagonal
      - Burbankite (Na,Ca)_{3}(Sr,Ba,Ce)_{3}(CO_{3})_{5}, Khanneshite (NaCa)_{3}(Ba,Sr,Ce,Ca)_{3}(CO_{3})_{5}, Calcioburbankite Na_{3}(Ca,REE,Sr)_{3}(CO_{3})_{5}, Sanromanite Na_{2}CaPb_{3}(CO_{3})_{5}
    - Monoclinic
      - Rémondite-(Ce) Na_{3}(Ce,La,Ca,Na,Sr)_{3}(CO_{3})_{5}, Petersenite-(Ce) (Na,Ca)_{4}(Ce,La,Nd)_{2}(CO_{3})_{5}, Rémondite-(La) Na_{3}(La,Ce,Ca)_{3}(CO_{3})_{5}
  - Rosasite group
    - Rosasite (Cu,Zn)_{2}(CO_{3})(OH)_{2}, Glaukosphaerite (Cu,Ni)_{2}(CO_{3})(OH)_{2}, Kolwezite (Cu,Co)_{2}(CO_{3})(OH)_{2}, Zincrosasite (Zn,Cu)_{2}(CO_{3})(OH)_{2}, Mcguinnessite (Mg,Cu)_{2}(CO_{3})(OH)_{2}
  - Malachite group
    - Malachite Cu_{2}(CO_{3})(OH)_{2}, Nullaginite Ni_{2}(CO_{3})(OH)_{2}, Pokrovskite Mg_{2}(CO_{3})(OH)_{2}·0.5H_{2}O, Chukanovite Fe_{2}(CO_{3})(OH)_{2}
  - Ancylite group
    - Ancylite-(Ce) SrCe(CO_{3})_{2}(OH)·H_{2}O, Calcioancylite-(Ce) CaCe(CO_{3})_{2}(OH)·H_{2}O, Calcioancylite-(Nd) CaNd(CO_{3})_{2}(OH)·H_{2}O, Gysinite-(Nd) Pb(Nd,La)(CO_{3})_{2}(OH)·H_{2}O, Ancylite-(La) Sr(La,Ce)(CO_{3})_{2}(OH)·H_{2}O, Kozoite-(Nd) (Nd,La,Sm,Pr)(CO_{3})(OH), Kozoite-(La) La(CO_{3})(OH)
  - Sjogrenite-Hydrotalcite group
    - Sjogrenite subgroup: Hexagonal
      - Manasseite Mg_{6}Al_{2}[(OH)_{16}CO_{3}]·4H_{2}O, Barbertonite Mg_{6}(Cr,Al)_{2}[(OH)_{16}CO_{3}]·4H_{2}O, Sjogrenite Mg_{6}(Fe^{3+})_{2}[(OH)_{16}CO_{3}]·4H_{2}O, Zaccagnaite Zn_{4}Al_{2}(OH)_{12}(CO_{3})·3H_{2}O, Fougerite (Fe^{2+},Mg)_{6}(Fe^{3+})_{2}(OH)_{18}·4H_{2}O
    - Hydrotalcite subgroup: Rhombohedral I, Mg_{6}(R^{3+})_{2}(OH)_{16}CO_{3}·4H_{2}O, where R^{3+} = Al, Cr, or Fe
      - Hydrotalcite Mg_{6}Al_{2}[(OH)_{16}CO_{3}]·4H_{2}O, Stichtite Mg_{6}Cr_{2}[(OH)_{16}CO_{3}]·4H_{2}O, Pyroaurite Mg_{6}Fe^{3+}_{2}[(OH)_{16}CO_{3}]·4H_{2}O, Desautelsite Mg_{6}(Mn^{3+})_{2}[(OH)_{16}CO_{3}]·4H_{2}O, Droninoite Ni_{3}Fe^{3+}Cl(OH)_{8}·2H_{2}O, Hydrowoodwardite Cu_{1−x}Al_{x}[(OH)_{2}(SO_{4})_{x/2}]·nH_{2}O, Iowaite Mg_{4}Fe(OH)_{8}OCl·4H_{2}O
    - Hydrotalcite subgroup: Rhombohedral II
      - Reevesite Ni_{6}(Fe^{3+})_{2}(CO_{3})(OH)_{16}·4H_{2}O, Takovite Ni_{6}Al_{2}(OH)_{16}(CO_{3},OH)·4H_{2}O, Comblainite (Ni^{2+})_{6}(Co^{3+})_{2}(CO_{3})(OH)_{16}·4H_{2}O
  - Tundrite group
    - Tundrite-(Ce) Na_{2}Ce_{2}TiO_{2}(SiO_{4})(CO_{3})_{2}, Tundrite-(Nd) Na_{3}(Nd,La)_{4}(Ti,Nb)_{2}(SiO_{4})_{2}(CO_{3})_{3}O_{4}(OH)·2H_{2}O
- Category:Nitrate minerals

=== Category 06 ===
- Borates
  - Ludwigite group (Space group: Pbam)
    - Ludwigite Mg_{2}Fe^{3+}BO_{5}, Vonsenite Fe^{2+}_{2}Fe^{3+}BO_{5}, Azoproite (Mg,Fe^{2+})_{2}(Fe^{3+},Ti,Mg)BO_{5}, Bonaccordite Ni_{2}Fe^{3+}BO_{5}, Chestermanite Mg_{2}(Fe^{3+},Mg,Al,Sb^{5+})BO_{3}O_{2}, Fredrikssonite Mg_{2}(Mn^{3+},Fe^{3+})O_{2}(BO_{3})
  - Boracite group (Tecto-heptaborates)
    - (Orthorhombic: Rca21)
      - Boracite Mg_{3}B_{7}O_{13}Cl, Ericaite (Fe^{2+},Mg,Mn)_{3}B_{7}O_{13}Cl, Chambersite Mn_{3}B_{7}O_{13}Cl
    - (Trigonal: R3c)
      - Congolite (Fe^{2+},Mg,Mn)_{3}B_{7}O_{13}Cl, Trembathite (Mg,Fe^{2+})_{3}B_{7}O_{13}Cl
  - Inderite group (Neso-triborates)
    - Inyoite Ca_{2}B_{6}O_{6}(OH)_{10}·8H_{2}O, Inderborite CaMg[B_{3}O_{3}(OH)_{5}]_{2}·6H_{2}O, Inderite MgB_{3}O_{3}(OH)_{5}·5H_{2}O, Kurnakovite Mg(H_{4}B_{3}O_{7})(OH)·5H_{2}O, Meyerhofferite Ca_{2}(H_{3}B_{3}O_{7})_{2}·4H_{2}O, Solongoite Ca_{2}(H_{3}B_{3}O_{7})(OH)Cl
  - Santite group (Neso-pentaborates)
    - Santite KB_{5}O_{6}(OH)_{4}·2H_{2}O, Ramanite-(Rb) Rb[B_{5}O_{6}(OH)_{4}]·2H_{2}O, Ramanite-(Cs) Cs[B_{5}O_{6}(OH)_{4}]·2H_{2}O
  - Hilgardite group (Tecto-pentaborates)
    - Hilgardite Ca_{2}B_{5}O_{9}Cl·H_{2}O, Kurgantaite CaSr[B_{5}O_{9}]Cl·H_{2}O, IMA2007-047 Pb_{2}[B_{5}O_{9}]Cl·0.5H_{2}O
  - Pringleite group
    - Pringleite Ca_{9}B_{26}O_{34}(OH)_{24}Cl_{4}·13H_{2}O, Ruitenbergite Ca_{9}B_{26}O_{34}(OH)_{24}Cl_{4}·13H_{2}O, Brianroulstonite Ca_{3}[B_{5}O_{6}(OH)_{6}](OH)Cl_{2}·8H_{2}O, Penobsquisite Ca_{2}Fe^{2+}[B_{9}O_{13}(OH)_{6}]Cl·4H_{2}O, Walkerite Ca_{16}(Mg,Li,☐)_{2}[B_{13}O_{17}(OH)_{12}]_{4}Cl_{6}·28H_{2}O

=== Category 07 ===
- Sulfates, Selenates, Chromates, Molybdates, Wolframates, Niobates
  - Barite group
    - Barite BaSO_{4}, Celestine SrSO_{4}, Anglesite PbSO_{4}
  - Blodite group
    - Blodite Na_{2}Mg(SO_{4})_{2}·4H_{2}O, Nickelblodite Na_{2}(Ni,Mg)(SO_{4})_{2}·4H_{2}O, Leonite K_{2}Mg(SO_{4})_{2}·4H_{2}O, Mereiterite K_{2}Fe^{2+}(SO_{4})_{2}·4H_{2}O, Changoite Na_{2}Zn(SO_{4})_{2}·4H_{2}O
  - Alum group, XAl(SO_{4})_{2}·12H_{2}O
    - Alum-(K) KAl[SO_{4}]_{2}·12H_{2}O, Alum-(Na) NaAl[SO_{4}]_{2}·12H_{2}O, Tschermigite (NH_{4})Al(SO_{4})_{2}·12H_{2}O, Lonecreekite (NH_{4})(Fe^{3+},Al)(SO_{4})_{2}·12H_{2}O, Lanmuchangite TlAl(SO_{4})_{2}·12H_{2}O
  - Voltaite group
    - Voltaite K_{2}(Fe^{2+})_{5}(Fe^{3+})_{3}Al(SO_{4})_{12}·18H_{2}O, Zincovoltaite K_{2}Zn_{5}(Fe^{3+})_{3}Al(SO_{4})_{12}·18H_{2}O, Pertlikite K_{2}(Fe^{2+},Mg)_{2}(Mg,Fe^{3+})_{4}(Fe^{3+})_{2}Al(SO_{4})_{12}·18H_{2}O
  - Aluminite group
    - Aluminite Al_{2}(SO_{4})(OH)_{4}·7H_{2}O, Mangazeite Al_{2}(SO_{4})(OH)_{4}·3H_{2}O
  - Zippeite group
    - Zippeite K_{4}(UO_{2})_{6}(SO_{4})_{3}(OH)_{10}·4H_{2}O, Natrozippeite Na_{4}(UO_{2})_{6}(SO_{4})_{3}(OH)_{10}·4H_{2}O, Magnesiozippeite Mg(H_{2}O)_{3.5}(UO_{2})_{2}(SO_{4})O_{2}, Nickelzippeite (Ni^{2+})_{2}(UO_{2})_{6}(SO_{4})_{3}(OH)_{10}·16H_{2}O, Zinc-zippeite (Zn^{2+})_{2}(UO_{2})_{6}(SO_{4})_{3}(OH)_{10}·16H_{2}O, Cobaltzippeite (Co^{2+})_{2}(UO_{2})_{6}(SO_{4})_{3}(OH)_{10}·16H_{2}O, Marecottite Mg_{3}(H_{2}O)_{18}[(UO_{2})_{4}O_{3}(SO_{4})_{2}]_{2}·10H_{2}O, Pseudojohannite Cu_{6.5}[(UO_{2})_{4}O_{4}(SO_{4})_{2}]_{2}(OH)_{5}·25H_{2}O, IMA2009-008 Y_{2}[(UO_{2})_{8}O_{6}(SO_{4})_{4}(OH)_{2}]·26H_{2}O
  - Copiapite group
    - Copiapite Fe^{2+}(Fe^{3+})_{4}(SO_{4})_{6}(OH)_{2}·20H_{2}O, Magnesiocopiapite Mg(Fe^{3+})_{4}(SO_{4})_{6}(OH)_{2}·20H_{2}O, Cuprocopiapite Cu(Fe^{3+})_{4}(SO_{4})_{6}(OH)_{2}·20H_{2}O, Ferricopiapite (Fe^{3+})_{2/3}(Fe^{3+})_{4}(SO_{4})_{6}(OH)_{2}·20H_{2}O, Calciocopiapite Ca(Fe^{3+})_{4}(SO_{4})_{6}(OH)_{2}·19H_{2}O, Zincocopiapite Zn(Fe^{3+})_{4}(SO_{4})_{6}(OH)_{2}·18H_{2}O, Aluminocopiapite Al_{2/3}(Fe^{3+})_{4}(SO_{4})_{6}O(OH)_{2}·20H_{2}O
  - Pb, Zn tellurates
    - Cheremnykhite Zn_{3}Pb_{3}Te^{4+}O_{6}(VO_{4})_{2}, Kuksite Pb_{3}Zn_{3}Te^{6+}O_{6}(PO_{4})_{2}, Dugganite Pb_{3}Zn_{3}Te(As,V,Si)_{2}(O,OH)_{14}, Joelbruggerite Pb_{3}Zn_{3}Sb^{5+}As_{2}O_{13}(OH)
  - "Halotrichite" supergroup
  - Hydrated acid and sulfates where A(B)_{2}(XO_{4})_{4}·xH_{2}O
    - Halotrichite group
      - Pickeringite MgAl_{2}(SO_{4})_{4}·22H_{2}O, Halotrichite Fe^{2+}Al_{2}(SO_{4})_{4}·22H_{2}O, Apjohnite MnAl_{2}(SO_{4})_{4}·22H_{2}O, Dietrichite (Zn,Fe^{2+},Mn)Al_{2}(SO_{4})_{4}·22H_{2}O, Bilinite Fe^{2+}(Fe^{3+})_{2}(SO_{4})_{4}·22H_{2}O, Redingtonite (Fe^{2+},Mg,Ni)(Cr,Al)_{2}(SO_{4})_{4}·22H_{2}O, Wupatkiite (Co,Mg,Ni)Al_{2}(SO_{4})_{4}·22H_{2}O
      - Ransomite Cu(Fe^{3+})_{2}(SO_{4})_{4}·6H_{2}O, Romerite Fe^{2+}(Fe^{3+})_{2}(SO_{4})_{4}·14H_{2}O, Lishizhenite Zn(Fe^{3+})_{2}(SO_{4})_{4}·14H_{2}O

==== "Kieserite" supergroup ====
- Hydrated acid and sulfates where AXO_{4}·xH_{2}O
  - Kieserite group
    - Kieserite MgSO_{4}·H_{2}O, Szomolnokite Fe^{2+}SO_{4}·H_{2}O, Szmikite MnSO_{4}·H_{2}O, Poitevinite (Cu,Fe^{2+},Zn)SO_{4}·H_{2}O, Gunningite (Zn,Mn)SO_{4}·H_{2}O, Dwornikite (Ni,Fe^{2+})SO_{4}·H_{2}O, Cobaltkieserite CoSO_{4}·H_{2}O
  - Rozenite group (Monoclinic)
    - Rozenite Fe^{2+}SO_{4}·4H_{2}O, Starkeyite MgSO_{4}·4H_{2}O, Ilesite (Mn,Zn,Fe^{2+})SO_{4}·4H_{2}O, Aplowite (Co,Mn,Ni)SO_{4}·4H_{2}O, Boyleite (Zn,Mg)SO_{4}·4H_{2}O, IMA2002-034 CdSO_{4}·4H_{2}O
  - Chalchanthite group (Triclinic: P-1)
    - Chalcanthite CuSO_{4}·5H_{2}O, Siderotil Fe^{2+}SO_{4}·5H_{2}O, Pentahydrite MgSO_{4}·5H_{2}O, Jokokuite MnSO_{4}·5H_{2}O
  - Hexahydrite group (Space group: C2/c)
    - Hexahydrite MgSO_{4}·6H_{2}O, Bianchite (Zn,Fe^{2+})(SO_{4})·6H_{2}O, Ferrohexahydrite Fe^{2+}SO_{4}·6H_{2}O, Nickelhexahydrite (Ni,Mg,Fe^{2+})(SO_{4})·6H_{2}O, Moorhouseite (Co,Ni,Mn)SO_{4}·6H_{2}O, Chvaleticeite (Mn^{2+},Mg)SO_{4}·6H_{2}O
  - Melanterite group (Heptahydrates, Monoclinic: P21/c)
    - Melanterite Fe^{2+}SO_{4}·7H_{2}O, Boothite CuSO_{4}·7H_{2}O, Zincmelanterite (Zn,Cu,Fe^{2+})SO_{4}·7H_{2}O, Bieberite CoSO_{4}·7H_{2}O, Mallardite Mn^{2+}SO_{4}·7H_{2}O, Alpersite (Mg,Cu)SO_{4}·7H_{2}O
  - Epsomite group
    - Epsomite MgSO_{4}·7H_{2}O, Goslarite ZnSO_{4}·7H_{2}O, Morenosite NiSO_{4}·7H_{2}O
  - Minasragrite group
    - (Monclinic and Triclinic)
      - Minasragrite VO(SO_{4})·5H_{2}O, Bobjonesite VO(SO_{4})H_{2}O_{3}, Anorthominasragrite V^{4+}O(SO_{4})H_{2}O_{5}
    - (Orthorhombic)
      - Stanleyite (V^{4+}O)SO_{4}·6H_{2}O, Orthominasragrite VO(SO_{4})·5H_{2}O
  - Bassanite 2CaSO_{4}·H_{2}O, Gypsum CaSO_{4}·2H_{2}O, Sanderite MgSO_{4}·2H_{2}O, Bonattite CuSO_{4}·3H_{2}O, Retgersite NiSO_{4}·6H_{2}O, Meridianiite MgSO_{4}·11H_{2}O

==== Alunite supergroup - Part I ====
- Category:Alunite group, A^{1+}(B^{3+})_{3}(SO_{4})_{2}(OH)_{6}
  - Alunite KAl_{3}[(OH)_{3}(SO_{4})]_{2}, Ammonioalunite (NH_{4})Al_{3}[(OH)_{3}(SO_{4})]_{2}, Ammoniojarosite (NH_{4})(Fe^{3+})_{3}(SO_{4})_{2}(OH)_{6}, Argentojarosite Ag(Fe^{3+})_{3}(SO_{4})_{2}(OH)_{6}, Beaverite-Cu Pb(Fe^{3+},Cu)_{3}(SO_{4})_{2}(OH)_{6} (Fe^{3+}:Cu ≈ 2:1), Beaverite-Zn Pb(Fe^{3+})_{2}Zn(SO_{4})_{2}(OH)_{6}, Dorallcharite (Tl,K)(Fe^{3+})_{3}(SO_{4})_{2}(OH)_{6}, Huangite Ca_{0.5}Al_{3}(SO_{4})_{2}(OH)_{6}, Hydroniumjarosite (H_{3}O)(Fe^{3+})_{3}(SO_{4})_{2}(OH)_{6}, Jarosite K(Fe^{3+})_{3}[(OH)_{3}|SO_{4}]_{2}, Natroalunite (Na,K)Al_{3}[(OH)_{3}(SO_{4})]_{2}, Natrojarosite Na(Fe^{3+})_{3}(SO_{4})_{2}(OH)_{6}, Osarizawaite PbCuAl_{2}(SO_{4})_{2}(OH)_{6}, Plumbojarosite Pb(Fe^{3+})_{6}(SO_{4})_{4}(OH)_{12}, Schlossmacherite (H_{3}O,Ca)Al_{3}(AsO_{4},SO_{4})_{2}(OH)_{6}, Walthierite Ba_{0.5}Al_{3}(SO_{4})_{2}(OH)_{6}, Mills et al. (2009)

=== Category 08 ===
- Phosphates, Arsenates, Polyvanadates
  - Category:Arsenate minerals

==== Class: Anhydrous phosphates ====
- Triphylite group
  - Triphylite LiFe^{2+}PO_{4}, Lithiophilite LiMnPO_{4}, Natrophilite NaMnPO_{4}
- Retzian series
  - Retzian-(Ce) Mn_{2}Ce(AsO_{4})(OH)_{4}, Retzian-(Nd) Mn_{2}(Nd,Ce,La)(AsO_{4})(OH)_{4}, Retzian-(La) (Mn,Mg)_{2}(La,Ce,Nd)(AsO_{4})(OH)_{4}

===== "Alluaudite-Wyllieite" supergroup =====
- Anhydrous phosphates, etc. (A^{+} B^{2+})_{5}(XO_{4})_{3}
  - Berzeliite group
    - Berzeliite (Ca,Na)_{3}(Mg,Mn)_{2}(AsO_{4})_{3}, Manganberzeliite (Ca,Na)_{3}(Mn,Mg)_{2}(AsO_{4})_{3}, Palenzonaite (Ca,Na)_{3}Mn^{2+}(V^{5+},As^{5+},Si)_{3}O_{12}, Schaferite NaCa_{2}Mg_{2}(VO_{4})_{3}
  - Alluaudite-Wyllieite group (Alluaudite subgroup I)
    - Caryinite (Na,Pb)(Ca,Na)(Ca,Mn^{2+})(Mn^{2+},Mg)_{2}(AsO_{4})_{3}, Arseniopleite (Ca,Na)(Na,Pb)Mn^{2+}(Mn^{2+},Mg,Fe^{2+})_{2}(AsO_{4})_{3}
  - Alluaudite-Wyllieite group (Alluaudite subgroup II/ Hagendorfite subgroup)
    - Ferrohagendorfite* (Na,Ca)_{2}Fe^{2+}(Fe^{2+},Fe^{3+})_{2}(PO_{4})_{3}, Hagendorfite NaCaMn(Fe^{2+},Fe^{3+},Mg)_{2}(PO_{4})_{3}, Varulite NaCaMn(Mn,Fe^{2+},Fe^{3+})_{2}(PO_{4})_{3}, Maghagendorfite NaMgMn(Fe^{2+},Fe^{3+})_{2}(PO_{4})_{3}, Ferroalluaudite NaCaFe^{2+}(Fe^{2+},Mn,Fe^{3+},Mg)_{2}(PO_{4})_{3}, Alluaudite NaCaFe^{2+}(Mn,Fe^{2+},Fe^{3+},Mg)_{2}(PO_{4})_{3}, Odanielite Na(Zn,Mg)_{3}H_{2}(AsO_{4})_{3}, Johillerite Na(Mg,Zn)_{3}Cu(AsO_{4})_{3}, Nickenichite Na_{0.8}Ca_{0.4}(Mg,Fe^{3+},Al)_{3}Cu_{0.4}(AsO_{4})_{3}, Yazganite Na(Fe^{3+})_{2}(Mg,Mn)(AsO_{4})_{3}·H_{2}O, IMA2008-054 NaCaMn_{2}(PO_{4})[PO_{3}(OH)]_{2}, IMA2008-064 Na_{16}(Mn^{2+})_{25}Al_{8}(PO_{4})_{30}
  - Alluaudite-Wyllieite group (Wyllieite subgroup)
    - Ferrowyllieite (Na,Ca,Mn)(Fe^{2+},Mn)(Fe^{2+},Fe^{3+},Mg)Al(PO_{4})_{3}, Wyllieite (Na,Ca,Mn^{2+})(Mn^{2+},Fe^{2+})(Fe ^{2+}, Fe^{3+},Mg)Al(PO_{4})_{3}, Rosemaryite (Na,Ca,Mn^{2+})(Mn^{2+},Fe^{2+})(Fe^{3+},Fe^{2+},Mg)Al(PO_{4})_{3}, Qingheiite Na_{2}(Mn^{2+},Mg,Fe^{2+})(Al,Fe^{3+})(PO_{4})_{3}, Bobfergusonite Na_{2}(Mn^{2+})_{5}Fe^{3+}Al(PO_{4})_{6}, Bradaczekite NaCu_{4}(AsO_{4})_{3}, Ferrorosemaryite ☐NaFe^{2+}Fe^{3+}Al(PO_{4})_{3}
  - Fillowite group
    - Fillowite Na_{2}Ca(Mn,Fe^{2+})_{7}(PO_{4})_{6}, Johnsomervilleite Na_{2}Ca(Mg,Fe^{2+},Mn)_{7}(PO_{4})_{6}, Chladniite Na_{2}Ca(Mg,Fe^{2+})_{7}(PO_{4})_{6}, Galileiite Na(Fe^{2+})_{4}(PO_{4})_{3}, Xenophyllite Na_{4}Fe_{7}(PO_{4})_{6}, Stornesite-(Y) (Y, Ca)☐_{2}Na_{6}(Ca,Na)_{8}(Mg,Fe)_{43}(PO_{4})_{36}
  - Nabiasite BaMn_{9}[(V,As)O_{4}]_{6}(OH)_{2}

===== "Whitlockite" supergroup =====
- Anhydrous phosphates, etc. (A^{+} B^{2+})_{3}(XO_{4})_{2}
- Sarcopside group
  - Sarcopside (Fe^{2+},Mn,Mg)_{3}(PO_{4})_{2}, Farringtonite Mg_{3}(PO_{4})_{2}, Chopinite (Mg,Fe)_{3}(PO_{4})_{2}
- Whitlockite group
  - Whitlockite Ca_{9}(Mg,Fe^{2+})(PO_{4})_{6}(PO_{3}OH), Strontiowhitlockite Sr_{7}(Mg,Ca)_{3}(PO_{4})_{6}[PO_{3}(OH)], Merrillite-(Ca)* (Ca,☐)_{19}Mg_{2}(PO_{4})_{14}, Merrillite Ca_{18}Na_{2}Mg_{2}(PO_{4})_{14}, Merrillite-(Y)* Ca_{16}Y_{2}Mg_{2}(PO_{4})_{14}, Ferromerrillite Ca_{9}NaFe(PO_{4})_{7}, Tuite Ca_{3}(PO_{4})_{2}, Bobdownsite Ca_{9}Mg(PO_{3}F)(PO_{4})_{6}
- Xanthiosite Ni_{3}(AsO_{4})_{2}, Graftonite (Fe^{2+},Mn,Ca)_{3}(PO_{4})_{2}, Beusite (Mn^{2+},Fe^{2+},Ca,Mg)_{3}(PO_{4})_{2}, Stanfieldite Ca_{4}(Mg,Fe^{2+},Mn)_{5}(PO_{4})_{6}, Hurlbutite CaBe_{2}(PO_{4})_{2}, Stranskiite Zn_{2}Cu^{2+}(AsO_{4})_{2}, Keyite (Cu^{2+})_{3}(Zn,Cu)_{4}Cd_{2}(AsO_{4})_{6}·2H_{2}O, Lammerite Cu_{3}[(As,P)O_{4}]_{2}, Mcbirneyite Cu_{3}(VO_{4})_{2}, Tillmannsite (Ag_{3}Hg)(V,As)O_{4}, IMA2009-002 Cu_{3}(AsO_{4})_{2}

===== "Monazite" supergroup =====
- Anhydrous phosphates, etc. A^{+}XO_{4}
- Berlinite group
  - Berlinite AlPO_{4}, Alarsite AlAsO_{4}, Rodolicoite Fe^{3+}PO_{4}
- Monazite group (Monoclinic: P21/n)
  - Monazite-(Ce) (Ce,La,Nd,Th)PO_{4}, Monazite-(La) (La,Ce,Nd)PO_{4}, Cheralite-(Ce)? (Ce,Ca,Th)(P,Si)O_{4}, Brabantite? CaTh(PO_{4})_{2}, Monazite-(Nd) (Nd,Ce,La)(P,Si)O_{4}, Gasparite-(Ce) CeAsO_{4}, Monazite-(Sm) SmPO_{4}
- Lithiophosphate group
  - Lithiophosphate Li_{3}PO_{4}, Olympite LiNa_{5}(PO_{4})_{2}, Nalipoite NaLi_{2}PO_{4}
- Zenotime group (Tetragonal: I41/amd)
  - Xenotime-(Y) YPO_{4}, Chernovite-(Y) YAsO_{4}, Wakefieldite-(Y) YVO_{4}, Wakefieldite-(Ce) (Ce^{3+},Pb^{2+},Pb^{4+})VO_{4}, Pretulite ScPO_{4}, Xenotime-(Yb) YbPO_{4}, Wakefieldite-(La) LaVO_{4}, Wakefieldite-(Nd) NdVO_{4}
- Heterosite Fe^{3+}PO_{4}, Purpurite Mn^{3+}PO_{4}, Rooseveltite BiAsO_{4}, Tetrarooseveltite BiAsO_{4}, Pucherite BiVO_{4}, Clinobisvanite BiVO_{4}, Dreyerite BiVO_{4}, Ximengite BiPO_{4}, Kosnarite K(Zr^{4+})_{2}(PO_{4})_{3}, Petewilliamsite (Ni,Co,Cu)_{30}(As_{2}O_{7})_{15}

===== "Adelite" supergroup =====
- Anhydrous phosphates, etc. containing hydroxyl or halogen where (A B)_{2} (XO_{4}) Zq
- Adelite group
  - Adelite CaMg(AsO_{4})(OH), Conichalcite CaCu(AsO_{4})(OH), Austinite CaZn(AsO_{4})(OH), Duftite-beta? PbCu(AsO_{4})(OH), Gabrielsonite PbFe^{2+}(AsO_{4})(OH), Tangeite CaCu(VO_{4})(OH), Nickelaustinite Ca(Ni,Zn)(AsO_{4})(OH), Cobaltaustinite CaCo(AsO_{4})(OH), Arsendescloizite PbZn(AsO_{4})(OH), Gottlobite CaMg(VO_{4},AsO_{4})(OH)
- Descloizite group
  - Descloizite PbZn(VO_{4})(OH), Mottramite PbCu(VO_{4})(OH), Pyrobelonite PbMn(VO_{4})(OH), Cechite Pb(Fe^{2+},Mn)(VO_{4})(OH), Duftite-alpha PbCu(AsO_{4})(OH)
- Herderite group
  - Herderite CaBe(PO_{4})F, Hydroxylherderite CaBe(PO_{4})(OH), Vayrynenite MnBe(PO_{4})(OH,F), Bergslagite CaBe(AsO_{4})(OH)
- Lacroixite group
  - Lacroixite NaAl(PO_{4})F, Durangite NaAl(AsO_{4})F, Maxwellite NaFe^{3+}(AsO_{4})F
- Tilasite group
  - Tilasite CaMg(AsO_{4})F, Isokite CaMg(PO_{4})F, Panasqueiraite CaMg(PO_{4})(OH,F)
- Amblygonite group
  - Amblygonite (Li,Na)Al(PO_{4})(F,OH), Montebrasite? LiAl(PO_{4})(OH,F), Natromontebrasite? (Na,Li)Al(PO_{4})(OH,F)
- Dussertite group
  - Dussertite Ba(Fe^{3+})_{3}(AsO_{4})_{2}(OH)_{5}, Florencite-(Ce) CeAl_{3}(PO_{4})_{2}(OH)_{6}, Florencite-(La) (La,Ce)Al_{3}(PO_{4})_{2}(OH)_{6}, Florencite-(Nd) (Nd,Ce)Al_{3}(PO_{4})_{2}(OH)_{6}
- Arsenoflorencite group
  - Arsenoflorencite-(Ce) (Ce,La)Al_{3}(AsO_{4})_{2}(OH)_{6}, Arsenoflorencite-(Nd)* (Nd,La,Ce,Ba)(Al,Fe^{3+})_{3}(AsO_{4},PO_{4})_{2}(OH)_{6}, Arsenoflorencite-(La)* (La,Sr)Al_{3}(AsO_{4},SO_{4},PO_{4})_{2}(OH)_{6}, Graulichite-(Ce) Ce(Fe^{3+})_{3}(AsO_{4})_{2}(OH)_{6}
- Waylandite group
  - Waylandite BiAl_{3}(PO_{4})_{2}(OH)_{6}, Eylettersite (Th,Pb)_{1−x}Al_{3}(PO_{4},SiO_{4})_{2}(OH)_{6} (?), Zairite Bi(Fe^{3+},Al)_{3}(PO_{4})_{2}(OH)_{6}, Arsenogorceixite BaAl_{3}AsO_{3}(OH)(AsO_{4},PO_{4})(OH,F)_{6}
- Babefphite BaBe(PO_{4})(F,O), Brazilianite NaAl_{3}(PO_{4})_{2}(OH)_{4}, Tavorite LiFe^{3+}(PO_{4})(OH), Vesignieite Cu_{3}Ba(VO_{4})_{2}(OH)_{2}, Bayldonite (Cu,Zn)_{3}Pb(AsO_{3}OH)_{2}(OH)_{2}, Curetonite Ba_{4}Al_{3}Ti(PO_{4})_{4}(O,OH)_{6}, Thadeuite (Ca,Mn^{2+})(Mg,Fe^{2+},Mn^{3+})_{3}(PO_{4})_{2}(OH,F)_{2}, Leningradite Pb(Cu^{2+})_{3}(VO_{4})_{2}Cl_{2}, Arctite Na_{2}Ca_{4}(PO_{4})_{3}F, Wilhelmkleinite Zn(Fe^{3+})_{3}(AsO_{4})_{2}(OH)_{2}, Artsmithite Hg^{+}_{4}Al(PO_{4})_{1.74}(OH)_{1.78}

===== "Olivenite" supergroup =====
- Anhydrous phosphates, etc. containing hydroxyl or halogen where (A)_{2} (XO_{4}) Zq
- Zwieselite group
  - Zwieselite (Fe^{2+},Mn)_{2}(PO_{4})F, Triplite (Mn,Fe^{2+},Mg,Ca)_{2}(PO_{4})(F,OH), Magniotriplite? (Mg,Fe^{2+},Mn)_{2}(PO_{4})F
- Wagnerite group
  - Wagnerite (Mg,Fe^{2+})_{2}(PO_{4})F, Hydroxylwagnerite Mg_{2}(PO_{4})(OH)
- Wolfeite group
  - Wolfeite (Fe^{2+},Mn^{2+})_{2}(PO_{4})(OH), Triploidite (Mn,Fe^{2+})_{2}(PO_{4})(OH), Sarkinite (Mn^{2+})_{2}(AsO_{4})(OH), Stanekite Fe^{3+}(Mn,Fe^{2+},Mg)(PO_{4})O, Joosteite (Mn^{2+},Mn^{3+},Fe^{3+})_{2}(PO_{4})O
- Satterlyite group
  - Satterlyite (Fe^{2+},Mg)_{2}(PO_{4})(OH), Holtedahlite Mg_{12}(PO_{3}OH,CO_{3})(PO_{4})_{5}(OH,O)_{6}
- Olivenite group
  - Olivenite subgroup
    - Adamite Zn_{2}(AsO_{4})(OH), Eveite (Mn^{2+})_{2}[OHAsO_{4}], Libethenite Cu_{2}PO_{4}OH, Olivenite Cu_{2}[OHAsO_{4}], Zincolivenite CuZn(AsO_{4})(OH), Zincolibethenite CuZn(PO_{4})OH
  - Tarbuttite subgroup
    - Tarbuttite Zn_{2}PO_{4}OH, Paradamite Zn_{2}[OHAsO_{4}]
- Althausite Mg_{2}(PO_{4})(OH,F,O), Augelite Al_{2}(PO_{4})(OH)_{3}, Arsenobismite? Bi_{2}(AsO_{4})(OH)_{3}, Angelellite (Fe^{3+})_{4}(AsO_{4})_{2}O_{3}, Spodiosite? Ca_{2}(PO_{4})F

===== "Arrojadite" supergroup =====
- Anhydrous phosphates, etc. containing hydroxyl or halogen where (A B)m (XO_{4})_{4} Zq
  - Palermoite group
    - Palermoite (Sr,Ca)(Li,Na)_{2}Al_{4}(PO_{4})_{4}(OH)_{4}, Bertossaite Li_{2}CaAl_{4}(PO_{4})_{4}(OH)_{4}
  - Arrojadite group (Arrojadite subgroup) (Al in Al site, OH in W site, Fe in M site)
    - Arrojadite KNa_{4}Ca(Mn^{2+})_{4}(Fe^{2+})_{10}Al(PO_{4})_{12}(OH,F)_{2}, Arrojadite-(KNa) KNa_{4}Ca(Fe,Mn,Mg)_{13}Al(PO_{4})_{11}(PO_{3}OH)(OH,F)_{2}, Arrojadite-(KFe) KNa_{2}CaNa_{2}(Fe^{2+},Mn,Mg)_{13}Al(PO_{4})_{11}(PO_{3}OH)(OH,F)_{2}, Arrojadite-(NaFe) NaNa_{2}CaNa_{2}(Fe^{2+},Mn,Mg)_{13}Al(PO_{4})_{11}(PO_{3}OH)(OH,F)_{2}, Arrojadite-(BaNa) BaFe^{2+}Na_{2}Ca(Fe^{2+},Mn,Mg)_{13}Al(PO_{4})_{11}(PO_{3}OH)(OH,F)_{2}, Arrojadite-(BaFe) (Ba,K,Pb)Na_{3}(Ca,Sr)(Fe^{2+},Mg,Mn)_{14}Al(PO_{4})_{11}(PO_{3}OH)(OH,F)_{2}, Arrojadite-(SrFe) SrFe^{2+}Na_{2}Ca(Fe^{2+},Mn,Mg)_{13}Al(PO_{4})_{11}(PO_{3}OH)(OH,F)_{2}, Arrojadite-(PbFe) PbFe^{2+}Na_{2}Ca(Fe^{2+},Mn,Mg)_{13}Al(PO_{4})_{11}(PO_{3}OH)(OH,F)_{2}
  - Arrojadite group (Fluorarrojadite subgroup) (Al in Al site, F in W site, Fe in M site)
    - Fluorarrojadite-(KNa) KNa_{4}Ca(Fe,Mn,Mg)_{13}Al(PO_{4})_{11}(PO_{3}OH)(F,OH)_{2}, Fluorarrojadite-(BaNa) BaFe^{2+}Na_{2}Ca(Fe^{2+},Mn,Mg)_{13}Al(PO_{4})_{11}(PO_{3}OH)(F,OH)_{2}, Fluorarrojadite-(BaFe) (Ba,K,Pb)Na_{3}(Ca,Sr)(Fe^{2+},Mg,Mn)_{14}Al(PO_{4})_{11}(PO_{3}OH)(F,OH)_{2}
  - Arrojadite group (Dickinsonite subgroup) (Fe in Al site, OH in W site, Fe in M site)
    - Dickinsonite? KNa_{4}Ca(Mn^{2+},Fe^{2+})_{14}Al(PO_{4})_{12}(OH)_{2}, Dickinsonite-(KMnNa) KNaMnNa_{3}Ca(Mn,Fe,Mg)_{13}Al(PO_{4})_{11}(PO_{4})(OH,F)_{2}, Dickinsonite-(KNaNa) KNaNa_{4}Ca(Mn,Fe,Mg)_{13}Al(PO_{4})_{11}(PO_{4})(OH,F)_{2}, Dickinsonite-(KNa) KNa_{4}Ca(Mn,Fe,Mg)_{13}Al(PO_{4})_{11}(PO_{4})(OH,F)_{2}, Dickinsonite-(NaNa) Na_{2}Na_{4}Ca(Mn,Fe,Mg)_{13}Al(PO_{4})_{11}(PO_{4})(OH,F)_{2}
  - Ferri-arrojadite-(BaNa) BaFe^{2+}Na_{2}Ca(Fe^{2+},Mn,Mg)_{13}Al(PO_{4})_{11}(PO_{3}OH)(F,OH)_{2}
  - Lulzacite Sr_{2}Fe^{2+}(Fe^{2+},Mg)_{2}Al_{4}(PO_{4})_{4}(OH)_{10}

===== "Apatite" supergroup =====
- Anhydrous phosphates, etc. containing hydroxyl or halogen where (A)_{5} (XO_{4})_{3} Zq
  - Morelandite group
    - Morelandite (Ba,Ca,Pb)_{5}(AsO_{4},PO_{4})_{3}Cl, Alforsite Ba_{5}(PO_{4})_{3}Cl
  - Clinomimetite group
    - Clinomimetite Pb_{5}(AsO_{4})_{3}Cl, Apatite-(CaOH)-M (Ca,Na)_{5}[(P,S)O_{4}]_{3}(OH,Cl)
  - Apatite group
    - Apatite* Ca_{5}(PO_{4})_{3}(OH,F,Cl), Apatite-(CaF) Ca_{5}(PO_{4})_{3}F, Apatite-(CaCl) Ca_{5}(PO_{4})_{3}Cl, Apatite-(CaOH) Ca_{5}(PO_{4})_{3}(OH), Carbonate-fluorapatite? Ca_{5}(PO_{4},CO_{3})_{3}F, Carbonate-hydroxylapatite? Ca_{5}(PO_{4},CO_{3})_{3}(OH), Belovite-(Ce) (Sr,Ce,Na,Ca)_{5}(PO_{4})_{3}(OH), Belovite-(La) (Sr,La,Ce,Ca)_{5}(PO_{4})_{3}(F,OH), Kuannersuite-(Ce) Ba_{6}Na_{2}REE_{2}(PO_{4})_{6}FCl, Apatite-(SrOH) (Sr,Ca)_{5}(PO_{4})_{3}(F,OH), Fluorcaphite (Ca,Sr,Ce,Na)_{5}(PO_{4})_{3}F, Deloneite-(Ce) NaCa_{2}SrCe(PO_{4})_{3}F, Phosphohedyphane Ca_{2}Pb_{3}(PO_{4})_{3}Cl, IMA2008-009 Sr_{5}(PO_{4})_{3}F, IMA2008-068 Ca_{2}Pb_{3}(PO_{4})_{3}F
  - Svabite group
    - Svabite Ca_{5}(AsO_{4})_{3}F, Turneaureite Ca_{5}[(As,P)O_{4}]_{3}Cl, Johnbaumite Ca_{5}(AsO_{4})_{3}(OH), Fermorite (Ca,Sr)_{5}(AsO_{4},PO_{4})_{3}(OH)
  - Hedyphane Ca_{2}Pb_{3}(AsO_{4})_{3}Cl, Phosphohedyphane Ca_{2}Pb_{3}(PO_{4})_{3}Cl
  - Pyromorphite group
    - Pyromorphite Pb_{5}(PO_{4})_{3}Cl, Mimetite Pb_{5}(AsO_{4})_{3}Cl, Vanadinite Pb_{5}(VO_{4})_{3}Cl, Hydroxylpyromorphite Pb_{5}(PO_{4})_{3}OH

===== "Rockbridgeite" supergroup =====
- Anhydrous phosphates, etc. containing hydroxyl or halogen where (A B)_{5} (XO_{4})_{3} Zq
  - Kulanite group
    - Kulanite Ba(Fe^{2+},Mn,Mg)_{2}Al_{2}(PO_{4})_{3}(OH)_{3}, Penikisite BaMg_{2}Al_{2}(PO_{4})_{3}(OH)_{3}, Bjarebyite (Ba,Sr)(Mn^{2+},Fe^{2+},Mg)_{2}Al_{2}(PO_{4})_{3}(OH)_{3}, Perloffite Ba(Mn,Fe^{2+})_{2}(Fe^{3+})_{2}(PO_{4})_{3}(OH)_{3}, Johntomaite Ba(Fe^{2+},Ca,Mn^{2+})_{2}(Fe^{3+})_{2}(PO_{4})_{3}(OH)_{3}
  - Rockbridgeite group
    - Rockbridgeite (Fe^{2+},Mn)(Fe^{3+})_{4}(PO_{4})_{3}(OH)_{5}, Frondelite Mn^{2+}(Fe^{3+})_{4}(PO_{4})_{3}(OH)_{5}, Plimerite Zn(Fe^{3+})_{4}(PO_{4})_{3}(OH)_{5}
  - Griphite Ca(Mn,Na,Li)_{6}Fe^{2+}Al_{2}(PO_{4})_{6}(F,OH)_{2}

===== "Lazulite" supergroup =====
- Anhydrous phosphates, etc. containing hydroxyl or halogen where (A^{2+} B^{2+})_{3} (XO_{4})_{2} Zq
- Lazulite group
  - Lazulite MgAl_{2}(PO_{4})_{2}(OH)_{2}, Scorzalite (Fe^{2+},Mg)Al_{2}(PO_{4})_{2}(OH)_{2}, Hentschelite Cu^{2+}(Fe^{3+})_{2}(PO_{4})_{2}(OH)_{2}, Barbosalite Fe^{2+}(Fe^{3+})_{2}(PO_{4})_{2}(OH)_{2}
- Lipscombite group
  - Lipscombite (Fe^{2+},Mn^{2+})(Fe^{3+})_{2}(PO_{4})_{2}(OH)_{2}, Zinclipscombite Zn(Fe^{3+})_{2}(PO_{4})_{2}(OH)_{2}
- Goedkenite group
  - Goedkenite (Sr,Ca)_{2}Al(PO_{4})_{2}(OH), Bearthite Ca_{2}Al(PO_{4})_{2}(OH), Gamagarite Ba_{2}(Fe^{3+},Mn^{3+})(VO_{4})_{2}(OH), Tokyoite Ba_{2}Mn(VO_{4})_{2}(OH)
- Carminite group
  - Carminite Pb(Fe^{3+})_{2}(AsO_{4})_{2}(OH)_{2}, Sewardite Ca(Fe^{3+})_{2}(AsO_{4})_{2}(OH)_{2}
- Mounanaite group
  - Mounanaite Pb(Fe^{3+})_{2}(VO_{4})_{2}(OH)_{2}, Krettnichite Pb(Mn^{3+})_{2}(VO_{4})_{2}(OH)_{2}
- Preisingerite group
  - Preisingerite Bi_{3}(AsO_{4})_{2}O(OH), Schumacherite Bi_{3}[(V,As,P)O_{4}]_{2}O(OH)
- Jagowerite BaAl_{2}(PO_{4})_{2}(OH)_{2}, Melonjosephite CaFe^{2+}Fe^{3+}(PO_{4})_{2}(OH), Samuelsonite (Ca,Ba)Ca_{8}(Fe^{2+},Mn)_{4}Al_{2}(PO_{4})_{10}(OH)_{2}, Petitjeanite (Bi^{3+})_{3}(PO_{4})_{2}O(OH), Drugmanite Pb_{2}(Fe^{3+},Al)H(PO_{4})_{2}(OH)_{2}

==== Class: Hydrated phosphates ====
- Hureaulite group
  - Hureaulite Mn_{5}(PO_{3}OH)_{2}(PO_{4})_{2}·4H_{2}O, Sainfeldite Ca_{5}(AsO_{3}OH)_{2}(AsO_{4})_{2}·4H_{2}O, Villyaellenite (Mn^{2+})_{5}(AsO_{3}OH)_{2}(AsO_{4})_{2}·4H_{2}O, IMA2008-047 Cd_{3}Zn_{2}(AsO_{3}OH)_{2}(AsO_{4})_{2}·4H_{2}O, IMA2008-066 Mn_{5}(H_{2}O)_{4}(AsO_{3}OH)_{2}(AsO_{4})_{2}
- Lindackerite group
  - Lindackerite CuCu_{4}(AsO_{4})_{2}(AsO_{3}OH)_{2} · ~9 H_{2}O, Braithwaiteite NaCu_{5}(Ti,Sb)_{2}O_{2}(AsO_{4})_{4}[AsO_{3}(OH)]_{2}·8H_{2}O, Veselovskyite (Zn,Cu,Co)Cu_{4}(AsO_{4})_{2}(AsO_{3}OH)_{2}·9H_{2}O, IMA2008-010 CaCu_{4}(AsO_{4})_{2}(AsO_{3}OH)_{2}·10H_{2}O
- Struvite group
  - Struvite (NH_{4})MgPO_{4}·6H_{2}O, Struvite-(K) KMg(PO_{4})·6H_{2}O, Hazenite KNaMg_{2}(PO_{4})_{2}·14H_{2}O
- Autunite group
- Formula: A(UO_{2})_{2}(XO_{4})_{2} · (10-12) H_{2}O
  - A = Cu, Ca, Ba, or Mg; X = P or As.
  - Autunite Ca(UO_{2})_{2}(PO_{4})_{2} · (10-12) H_{2}O, Heinrichite Ba(UO_{2})_{2}(AsO_{4})_{2} · (10-12) H_{2}O, Kahlerite Fe^{2+}(UO_{2})_{2}(AsO_{4})_{2} · (10-12) H_{2}O, Novacekite-I Mg(UO_{2})_{2}(AsO_{4})_{2}·12H_{2}O, Sabugalite HAl(UO_{2})_{4}(PO_{4})_{4}·16H_{2}O, Saleeite Mg(UO_{2})_{2}(PO_{4})_{2}·10H_{2}O, Torbernite Cu(UO_{2})_{2}(PO_{4})_{2} · (8-12) H_{2}O, Uranocircite Ba(UO_{2})_{2}(PO_{4})_{2}·12H_{2}O, Uranospinite Ca(UO_{2})_{2}(AsO_{4})_{2}·10H_{2}O, Zeunerite Cu(UO_{2})_{2}(AsO_{4})_{2} · (10-16) H_{2}O
- Meta-autunite group
- Formula: A(UO_{2})_{2}(XO_{4})_{2}·nH_{2}O (n = 6, 7 or 8)
  - A = Cu, Ca, Ba, or Mg and X = P or As.
  - Abernathyite K_{2}(UO_{2})_{2}(AsO_{4})_{2}·6H_{2}O, Bassetite Fe^{2+}(UO_{2})_{2}(PO_{4})_{2}·8H_{2}O, Chernikovite (H_{3}O)_{2}(UO_{2})_{2}(PO_{4})_{2}·6H_{2}O, Lehnerite Mn^{2+}(UO_{2})_{2}(PO_{4})_{2}·8H_{2}O, Meta-ankoleite K_{2}(UO_{2})_{2}(PO_{4})_{2}·6H_{2}O, Meta-autunite Ca(UO_{2})_{2}(PO_{4})_{2} · (6-8) H_{2}O, Metakahlerite Fe^{2+}(UO_{2})_{2}(AsO_{4})_{2}·8H_{2}O, Metakirchheimerite Co(UO_{2})_{2}(AsO_{4})_{2}·8H_{2}O, Metalodevite Zn(UO_{2})_{2}(AsO_{4})_{2}·10H_{2}O, Metanovacekite Mg(UO_{2})_{2}(AsO_{4})_{2} · (4-8) H_{2}O, Metatorbernite Cu(UO_{2})_{2}(PO_{4})_{28}H_{2}O, Metauranocircite Ba(UO_{2})_{2}(PO_{4})_{2} · (6-8) H_{2}O, Metauranospinite Ca(UO_{2})_{2}(AsO_{4})_{2}·8H_{2}O, Metazeunerite Cu(UO_{2})_{2}(AsO_{4})_{2}·8H_{2}O, Natrouranospinite (Na_{2},Ca)(UO_{2})_{2}(AsO_{4})_{2}·5H_{2}O, Sodium Meta-autunite Na_{2}(UO_{2})_{2}(PO_{4})_{2} · (6-8) H_{2}O, Uramarsite (NH_{4},H_{3}O)_{2}(UO_{2})_{2}(AsO_{4},PO_{4})_{2}·6H_{2}O, Uramphite (NH_{4})(UO_{2})(PO_{4})·3H_{2}O
- Vivianite group
  - Vivianite (Fe^{2+})_{3}(PO_{4})_{2}·8H_{2}O, Baricite (Mg,Fe^{2+})_{3}(PO_{4})_{2}·8H_{2}O, Erythrite Co_{3}(AsO_{4})_{2}·8H_{2}O, Annabergite Ni_{3}(AsO_{4})_{2}·8H_{2}O, Köttigite Zn_{3}(AsO_{4})_{2}·8H_{2}O, Parasymplesite (Fe^{2+})_{3}(AsO_{4})_{2}·8H_{2}O, Hornesite Mg_{3}(AsO_{4})_{2}·8H_{2}O, Arupite (Ni,Fe^{2+})_{3}(PO_{4})_{2}·8H_{2}O, Pakhomovskyite Co_{3}(PO_{4})_{2}·8H_{2}O
- Walpurgite group
  - Walpurgite Bi_{4}(UO_{2})(AsO_{4})_{2}O_{4}·2H_{2}O, Orthowalpurgite (UO_{2})Bi_{4}O_{4}(AsO_{4})_{2}·2H_{2}O, Phosphowalpurgite (UO_{2})Bi_{4}(PO_{4})O_{4}·2H_{2}O
- Roscherite group
  - Roscherite Ca(Mn^{2+},Fe^{2+})_{5}Be_{4}(PO_{4})_{6}(OH)_{4}·6H_{2}O, Zanazziite Ca_{2}(Mg,Fe^{2+})(Mg,Fe^{2+},Al,Mn,Fe^{3+})_{4}Be_{4}(PO_{4})_{6}(OH)_{4}·6H_{2}O, Greifensteinite Ca_{2}Be_{4}(Fe^{2+},Mn)_{5}(PO_{4})_{6}(OH)_{4}·6H_{2}O, Atencioite Ca_{2}Fe^{2+}☐Mg_{2}(Fe^{2+})_{2}Be_{4}(PO_{4})_{6}(OH)_{4}·6H_{2}O, Guimaraesite Ca_{2}(Zn,Mg,Fe)_{5}Be_{4}(PO_{4})_{6}(OH)_{4}·6H_{2}O, Footemineite Ca_{2}Mn^{2+}(Mn^{2+})_{2}(Mn^{2+})_{2}Be_{4}(PO_{4})_{6}(OH)_{4}·6H_{2}O, Ruifrancoite Ca_{2}(☐,Mn)_{2}(Fe^{3+},Mn,Mg)_{4}Be_{4}(PO_{4})_{6}(OH)_{4}·6H_{2}O
- Pharmacosiderite group
  - Pharmacosiderite K(Fe^{3+})_{4}(AsO_{4})_{3}(OH)_{4} · (6-7) H_{2}O, Alumopharmacosiderite KAl_{4}(AsO_{4})_{3}(OH)_{4}·6H_{2}O, Bariopharmacosiderite Ba(Fe^{3+})_{4}(AsO_{4})_{3}(OH)_{5}·5H_{2}O, Barium-alumopharmacosiderite? BaAl_{4}(AsO_{4})_{3}(OH)_{5}·5H_{2}O, Natropharmacosiderite (Na,K)_{2}(Fe^{3+})_{4}(AsO_{4})_{3}(OH)_{5}·7H_{2}O
- 08.CE.75 group
  - Malhmoodite FeZr(PO_{4})_{2}·4H_{2}O, Zigrasite ZnZr(PO_{4})_{2}·4H_{2}O, Unnamed (Ca-analogue of zigrasite) CaZr(PO_{4})_{2}·4H_{2}O
- "Variscite" supergroup
- Hydrated phosphates, etc. where A^{3+} XO_{4} · xH_{2}O
  - Variscite group
    - Variscite AlPO_{4}·2H_{2}O, Strengite Fe^{3+}PO_{4}·2H_{2}O, Scorodite Fe^{3+}AsO_{4}·2H_{2}O, Mansfieldite AlAsO_{4}·2H_{2}O, Yanomamite In(AsO_{4})·2H_{2}O
  - Metavariscite group
    - Metavariscite AlPO_{4}·2H_{2}O, Phosphosiderite Fe^{3+}PO_{4}·2H_{2}O, Kolbeckite ScPO_{4}·2H_{2}O
  - Rhabdophane group
    - Rhabdophane-(Ce) (Ce,La)PO_{4}·H_{2}O, Rhabdophane-(La) (La,Ce)PO_{4}·H_{2}O, Rhabdophane-(Nd) (Nd,Ce,La)PO_{4}·H_{2}O, Grayite (Th,Pb,Ca)PO_{4}·H_{2}O, Brockite (Ca,Th,Ce)(PO_{4})·H_{2}O, Tristramite (Ca,U^{4+},Fe^{3+})(PO_{4},SO_{4})·2H_{2}O
  - Ningyoite group
    - Ningyoite (U,Ca,Ce)_{2}(PO_{4})_{2} · (1-2) H_{2}O, Lermontovite U^{4+}(PO_{4})(OH)·H_{2}O (?), Vyacheslavite U^{4+}(PO_{4})(OH)·2.5H_{2}O
  - Koninckite Fe^{3+}PO_{4}·3H_{2}O (?), Kankite Fe^{3+}AsO_{4}·3.5H_{2}O, Steigerite AlVO_{4}·3H_{2}O, Churchite-(Y) YPO_{4}·2H_{2}O, Churchite-(Nd) Nd(PO_{4})·2H_{2}O, Parascorodite Fe^{3+}AsO_{4}·2H_{2}O, Serrabrancaite MnPO_{4}·H_{2}O
- "Mixite" supergroup
- Hydrated phosphates, etc., containing hydroxyl or halogen where (A)_{2} (XO_{4}) Zq ·xH_{2}O
  - Mixite group (Arsenate series)
    - Mixite BiCu_{6}(AsO_{4})_{3}(OH)_{6}·3H_{2}O, Agardite-(Y) (Y,Ca)Cu_{6}(AsO_{4})_{3}(OH)_{6}·3H_{2}O, Agardite-(La) (La,Ca)Cu_{6}(AsO_{4})_{3}(OH)_{6}·3H_{2}O, Agardite-(Nd) (Pb,Nd,Y,La,Ca)Cu_{6}(AsO_{4})_{3}(OH)_{6}·3H_{2}O, Agardite-(Dy) (Dy,La,Ca)Cu_{6}(AsO_{4})_{3}(OH)_{6}·3H_{2}O, Agardite-(Ca) CaCu_{6}(AsO_{4})_{3}(OH)_{6}·3H_{2}O, Agardite-(Ce) (Ce,Ca)Cu_{6}(AsO_{4})_{3}(OH)_{6}·3H_{2}O, Goudeyite (Al,Y)Cu_{6}(AsO_{4})_{3}(OH)_{6}·3H_{2}O, Zalesiite (Ca,Y)Cu_{6}[(AsO_{4})_{2}(AsO_{3}OH)(OH)_{6}]·3H_{2}O, Plumboagardite (Pb,REE,Ca)Cu_{6}(AsO_{4})_{3}(OH)_{6}·3H_{2}O
  - Mixite group (Phosphate series)
    - Petersite-(Y) (Y,Ce,Nd,Ca)Cu_{6}(PO_{4})_{3}(OH)_{6}·3H_{2}O, Calciopetersite CaCu_{6}[(PO_{4})_{2}(PO_{3}OH)(OH)_{6}]·3H_{2}O
  - Zapatalite Cu_{3}Al_{4}(PO_{4})_{3}(OH)_{9}·4H_{2}O, Juanitaite (Cu,Ca,Fe)_{10}Bi(AsO_{4})_{4}(OH)_{11}·2H_{2}O

===== "Brackebushite" supergroup =====
- Hydrated phosphates, etc. where A^{2+} (B^{2+})_{2} (XO_{4}) · xH_{2}O
  - Fairfieldite subgroup
    - Fairfieldite Ca_{2}(Mn,Fe^{2+})(PO_{4})_{2}·2H_{2}O, Messelite Ca_{2}(Fe^{2+},Mn)(PO_{4})_{2}·2H_{2}O, Collinsite Ca_{2}(Mg,Fe^{2+})(PO_{4})_{2}·2H_{2}O, Cassidyite Ca_{2}(Ni,Mg)(PO_{4})_{2}·2H_{2}O, Talmessite Ca_{2}Mg(AsO_{4})_{2}·2H_{2}O, Gaitite Ca_{2}Zn(AsO_{4})_{2}·2H_{2}O, Roselite-beta Ca_{2}(Co,Mg)(AsO_{4})_{2}·2H_{2}O, Parabrandtite Ca_{2}Mn^{2+}(AsO_{4})·2H_{2}O, Hillite Ca_{2}(Zn, Mg)[PO_{4}]_{2}·2H_{2}O, Nickeltalmessite Ca_{2}Ni(AsO_{4})_{2}·2H_{2}O
  - Roselite subgroup
    - Roselite Ca_{2}(Co,Mg)(AsO_{4})_{2}·2H_{2}O, Brandtite Ca_{2}(Mn,Mg)(AsO_{4})_{2}·2H_{2}O, Zincroselite Ca_{2}Zn(AsO_{4})_{2}·2H_{2}O, Wendwilsonite Ca_{2}(Mg,Co)(AsO_{4})_{2}·2H_{2}O, Manganlotharmeyerite Ca(Mn^{3+},Mg,)_{2}(AsO_{4})_{2}(OH,H_{2}O)_{2}
  - Brackebushite group
    - Brackebuschite Pb_{2}(Mn,Fe^{+}_{2})(VO_{4})_{2}(OH), Arsenbrackebuschite Pb_{2}(Fe^{2+},Zn)(AsO_{4})_{2}·H_{2}O, Feinglosite Pb_{2}(Zn,Fe)[(As,S)O_{4}]_{2}·H_{2}O, Calderonite Pb_{2}Fe^{3+}(VO_{4})_{2}(OH), Bushmakinite Pb_{2}Al(PO_{4})(VO_{4})(OH)
  - Helmutwinklerite subgroup
    - Tsumcorite PbZnFe^{2+}(AsO_{4})_{2}·H_{2}O, Helmutwinklerite PbZn_{2}(AsO_{4})_{2}·2H_{2}O, Thometzekite Pb(Cu,Zn)_{2}(AsO_{4})_{2}·2H_{2}O, Mawbyite Pb(Fe^{3+}Zn)_{2}(AsO_{4})_{2}(OH,H_{2}O)_{2}, Rappoldite Pb(Co,Ni,Zn,)_{2}(AsO_{4})_{2}·2H_{2}O, Schneebergite Bi(Co,Ni)_{2}(AsO_{4})_{2}(OH,H_{2}O)_{2}, Nickelschneebergite Bi(Ni,Co)_{2}(AsO_{4})_{2}(OH,H_{2}O)_{2}, Cobalttsumcorite Pb(Co,Fe)_{2}(AsO_{4})_{2}(OH,H_{2}O)_{2}
  - Unnamed group
    - Wicksite NaCa_{2}(Fe^{2+},Mn^{2+})_{4}MgFe^{3+}(PO_{4})_{6}·2H_{2}O, Bederite (☐,Na)Ca_{2}(Mn^{2+},Mg,Fe^{2+})_{2}(Fe^{3+},Mg^{2+},Al)_{2}Mn^{2+}_{2}(PO_{4})_{6}·2H_{2}O, Tassieite (Na,☐)Ca_{2}(Mg,Fe^{2+},Fe^{3+})_{2}(Fe^{3+},Mg)_{2}(Fe^{2+},Mg)_{2}(PO_{4})_{6}·2H_{2}O
  - Anapaite Ca_{2}Fe^{2+}(PO_{4})_{2}·4H_{2}O, Prosperite CaZn_{2}(AsO_{4})_{2}·H_{2}O, Parascholzite CaZn_{2}(PO_{4})_{2}·2H_{2}O, Scholzite CaZn_{2}(PO_{4})_{2}·2H_{2}O, Phosphophyllite Zn_{2}(Fe^{2+},Mn)(PO_{4})_{2}·4H_{2}O, Cabalzarite Ca(Mg,Al,Fe^{2+})_{2}(AsO_{4})_{2}(H_{2}O,OH)_{2}, Grischunite NaCa_{2}(Mn^{2+})_{5}Fe^{3+}(AsO_{4})_{6}·2H_{2}O

===== "Turquoise" supergroup =====
- Hydrated phosphates, etc., containing hydroxyl or halogen where (A)_{3} (XO_{4})_{2} Zq ·xH_{2}O
  - Burangaite group
    - Burangaite (Na,Ca)_{2}(Fe^{2+},Mg)_{2}Al_{10}(PO_{4})_{8}(OH,O)_{12}·4H_{2}O, Dufrenite Fe^{+}_{2}(Fe^{3+})_{4}(PO_{4})_{3}(OH)_{5}·2H_{2}O, Natrodufrenite Na(Fe^{3+},Fe^{2+})(Fe^{3+},Al)_{5}(PO_{4})_{4}(OH)_{6}·2H_{2}O, Matioliite NaMgAl_{5}(PO_{4})_{4}(OH)_{6}·2H_{2}O, IMA2008-056 NaMn^{2+}(Fe^{3+})_{5}(PO_{4})_{4}(OH)_{6}·2H_{2}O
  - Souzalite group
    - Souzalite (Mg,Fe^{2+})_{3}(Al,Fe^{3+})_{4}(PO_{4})_{4}(OH)_{6}·2H_{2}O, Gormanite Fe^{2+}_{3}Al_{4}(PO_{4})_{4}(OH)_{6}·2H_{2}O, Andyrobertsite KCdCu_{5}(AsO_{4})_{4}[As(OH)_{2}O_{2}]·2H_{2}O, Calcioandyrobertsite-1M KCaCu_{5}(AsO_{4})_{4}[As(OH)_{2}O_{2}]·2H_{2}O, Calcioandyrobertsite-2O KCaCu_{5}(AsO_{4})_{4}[As(OH)_{2}O_{2}]·2H_{2}O
  - Turquoise group
    - Aheylite (Fe^{2+},Zn)Al_{6}[(OH)_{4}(PO_{4})_{2}]_{2}·4H_{2}O, Chalcosiderite Cu(Fe^{3+},Al)_{6}[(OH)_{4}(PO_{4})_{2}]_{2}·4H_{2}O, Faustite (Zn,Cu)Al_{6}[(OH)_{4}(PO_{4})_{2}]_{2}·4H_{2}O, Planerite Al_{6}[(OH)_{4}(HPO_{4})(PO_{4})]_{2}·4H_{2}O, Turquoise Cu(Al,Fe^{3+})_{6}[(OH)_{4}(PO_{4})_{2}]_{2}·4H_{2}O
  - Unnamed group
    - Sampleite NaCaCu_{5}(PO_{4})_{4}Cl·5H_{2}O, Lavendulan NaCaCu_{5}(AsO_{4})_{4}Cl·5H_{2}O, Zdenekite NaPb(Cu^{2+})_{5}(AsO_{4})_{4}Cl·5H_{2}O, Mahnertite (Na,Ca)(Cu^{2+})_{3}(AsO_{4})_{2}Cl·5H_{2}O, Lemanskiite NaCaCu_{5}(AsO_{4})_{4}Cl·5H_{2}O
  - Duhamelite? Pb_{2}Cu_{4}Bi(VO_{4})_{4}(OH)_{3}·8H_{2}O, Santafeite (Mn,Fe,Al,Mg)_{2}(Mn^{4+},Mn^{2+})_{2}(Ca,Sr,Na)_{3}(VO_{4},AsO_{4})_{4}(OH)_{3}·2H_{2}O, Ogdensburgite Ca_{2}(Zn,Mn)(Fe^{3+})_{4}(AsO_{4})_{4}(OH)_{6}·6H_{2}O, Dewindtite Pb_{3}[H(UO_{2})_{3}O_{2}(PO_{4})_{2}]_{2}·12H_{2}O

===== "Overite" supergroup =====
- Hydrated phosphates, etc., containing hydroxyl or halogen where (AB)_{4} (XO_{4})_{3} Zq ·xH_{2}O
  - Overite group
    - Overite CaMgAl(PO_{4})_{2}(OH)·4H_{2}O, Segelerite CaMgFe^{3+}(PO_{4})_{2}(OH)·4H_{2}O, Manganosegelerite (Mn,Ca)(Mn,Fe^{2+},Mg)Fe^{3+}(PO_{4})_{2}(OH)·4H_{2}O, Lunokite (Mn,Ca)(Mg,Fe^{2+},Mn)Al(PO_{4})_{2}(OH)·4H_{2}O, Wilhelmvierlingite CaMn^{2+}Fe^{3+}(PO_{4})_{2}(OH)·2H_{2}O, Kaluginite* (Mn^{2+},Ca)MgFe^{3+}(PO_{4})_{2}(OH)·4H_{2}O, Juonniite CaMgSc(PO_{4})_{2}(OH)·4H_{2}O
  - Jahnsite group
    - Jahnsite-(CaMnMg) CaMnMg_{2}(Fe^{3+})_{2}(PO_{4})_{4}(OH)_{2}·8H_{2}O, Jahnsite-(CaMnFe) CaMn^{2+}(Fe^{2+})_{2}(Fe^{3+})_{2}(PO_{4})_{4}(OH)_{2}·8H_{2}O, Jahnsite-(CaMnMn) CaMn^{2+}(Mn^{2+})_{2}(Fe^{3+})_{2}(PO_{4})_{4}(OH)_{2}·8H_{2}O, Jahnsite-(MnMnMn)* MnMnMn_{2}(Fe^{3+})_{2}(PO_{4})_{4}(OH)_{2}·8H_{2}O
  - Whiteite group
    - Whiteite-(CaFeMg) Ca(Fe^{2+},Mn^{2+})Mg_{2}Al_{2}(PO_{4})_{4}(OH)_{2}·8H_{2}O, Whiteite-(MnFeMg) (Mn^{2+},Ca)(Fe^{2+},Mn^{2+})Mg_{2}Al_{2}(PO_{4})_{4}(OH)_{2}·8H_{2}O, Whiteite-(CaMnMg) CaMn^{2+}Mg_{2}Al_{2}(PO_{4})_{4}(OH)_{2}·8H_{2}O, Rittmannite Mn^{2+}Mn^{2+}Fe^{2+}Al_{2}(OH)_{2}(PO_{4})_{4}·8H_{2}O, Jahnsite-(CaFeFe) (Ca,Mn)(Fe^{2+},Mn^{2+})(Fe^{2+})_{2}(Fe^{3+})_{2}(PO_{4})_{4}(OH)_{2}·8H_{2}O, Jahnsite-(NaFeMg) NaFe^{3+}Mg_{2}(Fe^{3+})_{2}(PO_{4})_{4}(OH)_{2}·8H_{2}O, Jahnsite-(CaMgMg) CaMgMg_{2}(Fe^{3+})_{2}(PO_{4})_{4}(OH)_{2}·8H_{2}O, Jahnsite-(NaMnMg) NaMnMg_{2}(Fe^{3+})_{2}(PO_{4})_{4}(OH)_{2}·8H_{2}O
  - Leucophosphite group
    - Leucophosphite K(Fe^{3+})_{2}(PO_{4})_{2}(OH)·2H_{2}O, Tinsleyite KAl_{2}(PO_{4})_{2}(OH)·2H_{2}O, Spheniscidite (NH_{4},K)(Fe^{3+},Al)_{2}(PO_{4})_{2}(OH)·2H_{2}O
  - Montgomeryite group
    - Montgomeryite Ca_{4}MgAl_{4}(PO_{4})_{6}(OH)_{4}·12H_{2}O, Kingsmountite (Ca,Mn^{2+})_{4}(Fe^{2+},Mn^{2+})Al_{4}(PO_{4})_{6}(OH)_{4}·12H_{2}O, Calcioferrite Ca_{4}Fe^{2+}(Fe^{3+},Al)_{4}(PO_{4})_{6}(OH)_{4}·12H_{2}O, Zodacite Ca_{4}Mn^{2+}(Fe^{3+})_{4}(PO_{4})_{6}(OH)_{4}·12H_{2}O, Angastonite CaMgAl_{2}(PO_{4})_{2}(OH)_{4}·7H_{2}O
  - Strunzite group
    - Strunzite Mn^{2+}(Fe^{3+})_{2}(PO_{4})_{2}(OH)_{2}·6H_{2}O, Ferrostrunzite Fe^{2+}(Fe^{3+})_{2}(PO_{4})_{2}(OH)_{2}·6H_{2}O, Ferristrunzite Fe^{3+}(Fe^{3+})_{2}(PO_{4})_{2}(OH)_{3}·5H_{2}O
  - Laueite group
    - Laueite Mn^{2+}(Fe^{3+})_{2}(PO_{4})_{2}(OH)_{2}·8H_{2}O, Stewartite Mn^{2+}(Fe^{3+})_{2}(PO_{4})_{2}(OH)_{2}·8H_{2}O, Pseudolaueite Mn^{2+}(Fe^{3+})_{2}(PO_{4})_{2}(OH)_{2} · (7-8) H_{2}O, Ushkovite Mg(Fe^{3+})_{2}(PO_{4})_{2}(OH)_{2}·8H_{2}O, Ferrolaueite Fe^{2+}(Fe^{3+})_{2}(PO_{4})_{2}(OH)_{2}·8H_{2}O
  - Gatumbaite group
    - Gatumbaite CaAl_{2}(PO_{4})_{2}(OH)_{2}·H_{2}O, Kleemanite ZnAl_{2}(PO_{4})_{2}(OH)_{2}·3H_{2}O
  - Vanuralite group
    - Vanuralite Al(UO_{2})_{2}(VO_{4})_{2}(OH)·11H_{2}O, Metavanuralite Al(UO_{2})_{2}(VO_{4})_{2}(OH)·8H_{2}O, Threadgoldite Al(UO_{2})_{2}(PO_{4})_{2}(OH)·8H_{2}O, Chistyakovaite Al(UO_{2})_{2}(AsO_{4})_{2}(F,OH)·6.5H_{2}O
  - Vauxite group
    - Vauxite Fe^{2+}Al_{2}(PO_{4})_{2}(OH)_{2}·6H_{2}O, Paravauxite Fe^{2+}Al_{2}(PO_{4})_{2}(OH)_{2}·8H_{2}O, Sigloite Fe^{3+}Al_{2}(PO_{4})_{2}(OH)_{3}·5H_{2}O, Gordonite MgAl_{2}(PO_{4})_{2}(OH)_{2}·8H_{2}O, Mangangordonite (Mn^{2+},Fe^{2+},Mg)Al_{2}(PO_{4})_{2}(OH)_{2}·8H_{2}O, Kastningite (Mn^{2+},Fe^{2+},Mg)Al_{2}(PO_{4})_{2}(OH)_{2}·8H_{2}O, Maghrebite MgAl_{2}(AsO_{4})_{2}(OH)_{2}·8H_{2}O
  - Bermanite group
    - Bermanite Mn^{2+}(Mn^{3+})_{2}(PO_{4})_{2}(OH)_{2}·4H_{2}O, Ercitite Na_{2}(H_{2}O)_{4}[(Mn^{3+})_{2}(OH)_{2}(PO_{4})_{2}]
  - Arthurite group/ Whitmoreite group
    - Whitmoreite Fe^{2+}(Fe^{3+})_{2}(PO_{4})_{2}(OH)_{2}·4H_{2}O, Arthurite Cu(Fe^{3+})_{2}(AsO_{4},PO_{4},SO_{4})_{2}(O,OH)_{2}·4H_{2}O, Ojuelaite Zn(Fe^{3+})_{2}(AsO_{4})^{2}(OH)_{2}·4H_{2}O, Earlshannonite (Mn,Fe^{2+})(Fe^{3+})_{2}(PO_{4})_{2}(OH)_{2}·4H_{2}O, Gladiusite (Fe^{2+})_{2}(Fe^{3+},Mg)_{4}(PO_{4})(OH)_{13}·H_{2}O, Cobaltarthurite Co(Fe^{3+})_{2}(AsO_{4})_{2}(OH)_{2}·4H_{2}O, Kunatite Cu(Fe^{3+})_{2}(PO_{4})_{2}(OH)_{2}·4H_{2}O, Bendadaite Fe^{2+}(Fe^{3+})_{2}(AsO_{4})_{2}(OH)_{2}·4H_{2}O
  - Sincosite group
    - Sincosite Ca(V^{4+}O)_{2}(PO_{4})_{2}·5H_{2}O, Phosphovanadylite (Ba,Ca,K,Na)_{x}[(V,Al)_{4}P_{2}(O,OH)_{16}]·12H_{2}O x~0.66, Bariosincosite Ba(V^{4+}O)_{2}(PO_{4})_{2}·4H_{2}O
  - Paulkerrite group
    - Paulkerrite K(Mg,Mn)_{2}(Fe^{3+},Al)_{2}Ti(PO_{4})_{4}(OH)_{3}·15H_{2}O, Mantienneite KMg_{2}Al_{2}Ti(PO_{4})_{4}(OH)_{3}·15H_{2}O, Matveevite? KTiMn_{2}(Fe^{3+})_{2}(PO_{4})_{4}(OH)_{3}·15H_{2}O, Benyacarite (H_{2}O,K)_{2}Ti(Mn^{2+},Fe^{2+})_{2}(Fe^{3+},Ti)_{2}Ti(PO_{4})_{4}(O,F)_{2}·14H_{2}O
  - Keckite Ca(Mn,Zn)_{2}(Fe^{3+})_{3}(PO_{4})_{4}(OH)_{3}·2H_{2}O, Minyulite KAl_{2}(PO_{4})_{2}(OH,F)·4H_{2}O, Giniite Fe^{2+}(Fe^{3+})_{4}(PO_{4})_{4}(OH)_{2}·2H_{2}O, Metavauxite Fe^{2+}Al_{2}(PO_{4})_{2}(OH)_{2}·8H_{2}O, Metavauxite Fe^{2+}Al_{2}(PO_{4})_{2}(OH)_{2}·8H_{2}O, Xanthoxenite Ca_{4}(Fe^{3+})_{2}(PO_{4})_{4}(OH)_{2}·3H_{2}O, Beraunite Fe^{2+}(Fe^{3+})_{5}(PO_{4})_{4}(OH)_{5}·4H_{2}O, Furongite Al_{2}(UO_{2})(PO_{4})_{3}(OH)_{2}·8H_{2}O, Mcauslanite H(Fe^{2+})_{3}Al_{2}(PO_{4})_{4}F·18H_{2}O, Vochtenite (Fe^{2+},Mg)Fe^{3+}[(UO_{2})(PO_{4})]_{4}(OH) · (12-13) H_{2}O

===== Alunite supergroup - Part II =====
- Beudantite group, AB_{3}(XO_{4})(SO_{4})(OH)_{6}
  - Beudantite PbFe_{3}[(OH)_{6}(SO_{4})(AsO_{4})], Corkite PbFe_{3}(PO_{4})(SO_{4})(OH)_{6}, Gallobeudantite PbGa_{3}(AsO_{4})(SO_{4})(OH)_{6}, Hidalgoite PbAl_{3}(AsO_{4})(SO_{4})(OH)_{6}, Hinsdalite PbAl_{3}(PO_{4})(SO_{4})(OH)_{6}, Kemmlitzite (Sr,Ce)Al_{3}(AsO_{4})(SO_{4})(OH)_{6}, Svanbergite SrAl_{3}(PO_{4})(SO_{4})(OH)_{6}, Weilerite BaAl_{3}H[(As,P)O_{4}]_{2}(OH)_{6}, Woodhouseite CaAl_{3}(PO_{4})(SO_{4})(OH)_{6}
- Dussertite group/ Arsenocrandallite group
  - Arsenocrandallite (Ca,Sr)Al_{3}[(As,P)O_{4}]_{2}(OH)_{5}·H_{2}O, Arsenoflorencite-(Ce) (Ce,La)Al_{3}(AsO_{4})_{2}(OH), Arsenogorceixite BaAl_{3}AsO_{3}(OH)(AsO_{4},PO_{4})(OH,F)_{6}, Arsenogoyazite (Sr,Ca,Ba)Al_{3}(AsO_{4},PO_{4})_{2}(OH,F)_{5}·H_{2}O, Dussertite Ba(Fe^{3+})_{3}(AsO_{4})_{2}(OH)_{5}, Graulichite-(Ce) Ce(Fe^{3+})_{3}(AsO_{4})_{2}(OH)_{6}, Philipsbornite PbAl_{3}(AsO_{4})_{2}(OH)_{5}·H_{2}O, Segnitite Pb(Fe^{3+})_{3}H(AsO_{4})_{2}(OH)_{6}
- Plumbogummite group/ Crandallite group
  - Benauite HSr(Fe^{3+})_{3}(PO_{4})_{2}(OH)_{6}, Crandallite CaAl_{3}[(OH)_{5}|(PO_{4})_{2}]·H_{2}O, Eylettersite (Th,Pb)_{1−x}Al_{3}(PO_{4},SiO_{4})_{2}(OH)_{6}(?), Florencite-(Ce) CeAl_{3}(PO_{4})_{2}(OH)_{6}, Florencite-(La) LaAl_{3}(PO_{4})_{2}(OH)_{6}, Florencite-(Nd) (Nd,La,Ce)Al_{3}(PO_{4})_{2}(OH)_{6}, Gorceixite BaAl_{3}(PO_{4})(PO_{3}OH)(OH)_{6}, Goyazite SrAl_{3}(PO_{4})_{2}(OH)_{5}·H_{2}O, Kintoreite Pb(Fe^{3+})_{3}(PO_{4})_{2}(OH,H_{2}O)_{6}, Plumbogummite PbAl_{3}(PO_{4})_{2}(OH)_{5}·H_{2}O, Springcreekite BaV_{3}(PO_{4})_{2}(OH,H_{2}O)_{6}, Waylandite BiAl_{3}(PO_{4})_{2}(OH)_{6}, Zairite Bi(Fe^{3+},Al)_{3}(PO_{4})_{2}(OH)_{6}, Mills et al. (2009)

==== Class: Non simple phosphates ====
- Stibiconite group
  - Stibiconite Sb^{3+}(Sb^{5+})_{2}O_{6}(OH), Bindheimite Pb_{2}Sb_{2}O_{6}(O,OH), Romeite (Ca,Fe^{2+},Mn,Na)_{2}(Sb,Ti)_{2}O_{6}(O,OH,F), Hydroxycalcioroméite (Lewisite) (Ca,Fe^{2+},Na)_{2}(Sb,Ti)_{2}O_{7}, Monimolite (Pb,Ca)_{2}Sb_{2}O_{7}, Stetefeldtite Ag_{2}Sb_{2}O_{6}(O,OH), Bismutostibiconite Bi(Sb^{5+},Fe^{3+})_{2}O_{7}, Partzite Cu_{2}Sb_{2}(O,OH)_{7} (?)
- Rossite group
  - Rossite CaV_{2}O_{6}·4H_{2}O, Metarossite CaV_{2}O_{6}·2H_{2}O, Ansermetite MnV_{2}O_{6}·4H_{2}O
- Pascoite group
  - Pascoite Ca_{3}V_{10}O_{28}·17H_{2}O, Magnesiopascoite Ca_{2}Mg[V_{10}O_{28}]·16H_{2}O
- Vanadium oxysalts (Hydrated)
  - Hewettite group
    - Hewettite CaV_{6}O_{16}·9H_{2}O, Metahewettite CaV_{6}O_{16}·3H_{2}O, Barnesite Na_{2}V_{6}O_{16}·3H_{2}O, Hendersonite Ca_{1.3}V_{6}O_{16}·6H_{2}O, Grantsite Na_{4}Ca_{x}(V^{4+})_{2}xV^{5+}_{12−2x}O_{32}·8H_{2}O
  - Straczekite group
    - Straczekite (Ca,K,Ba)(V^{5+},V^{4+})_{8}O_{20}·3H_{2}O, Corvusite (Na,Ca,K)V_{8}O_{20}·4H_{2}O, Fernandinite CaV_{8}O_{20}·4H_{2}O, Bariandite Al_{0.6}V_{8}O_{20}·9H_{2}O, Bokite (Al,Fe^{3+})_{1.3}(V^{4+},Fe)_{8}O_{20}·4.7H_{2}O, Kazakhstanite (Fe^{3+})_{5}(V^{4+})_{3}(V^{5+})_{12}O_{39}(OH)_{9}·9H_{2}O
  - Schubnelite Fe^{2+}(V^{5+}O_{4})H_{2}O, Fervanite (Fe^{3+})_{4}(VO_{4})_{4}·5H_{2}O, Bannermanite (Na,K)_{0.7}(V^{5+})_{6}O_{15}, Melanovanadite Ca(V^{4+})_{2}(V^{5+})_{2}O_{10}·5H_{2}O
- Anhydrous Molybdates and Tungstates where A XO4
  - Wolframite series
    - Wolframite* (Fe,Mn)WO_{4}, Hubnerite MnWO_{4}, Ferberite Fe^{2+}WO_{4}, Sanmartinite (Zn,Fe^{2+})WO_{4}, Heftetjernite ScTaO_{4}
  - Scheelite series
    - Scheelite CaWO_{4}, Powellite CaMoO_{4}
  - Wulfenite Series
    - Wulfenite PbMoO_{4}, Stolzite PbWO_{4}
  - Raspite PbWO_{4}

=== Category 10 ===
- Organic Compounds
  - Category:Coal
  - Category:Oil shale

==== Class: Organic minerals ====
- Category:Oxalate minerals

=== Extras ===
- Rocks, ores and other mixtures of minerals
  - Lapislazuli*, Psilomelane*, Olivine* (Fayalite-Forsterite Series)
- Ice
- Liquids: Water, Mercury Hg, Asphaltum*
- Amorphous solids: Polycrase, Pyrobitumen*, Amber*
  - Vitreous (melts by heating): Tektite, Obsidian

== See also ==
- Classification of silicate minerals – List of IMA recognized minerals and groupings
- Crystal system – Classification of crystalline materials by their three-dimensional structural geometry
- List of rock types
