= Magnetoplumbite =

Oxide mineral

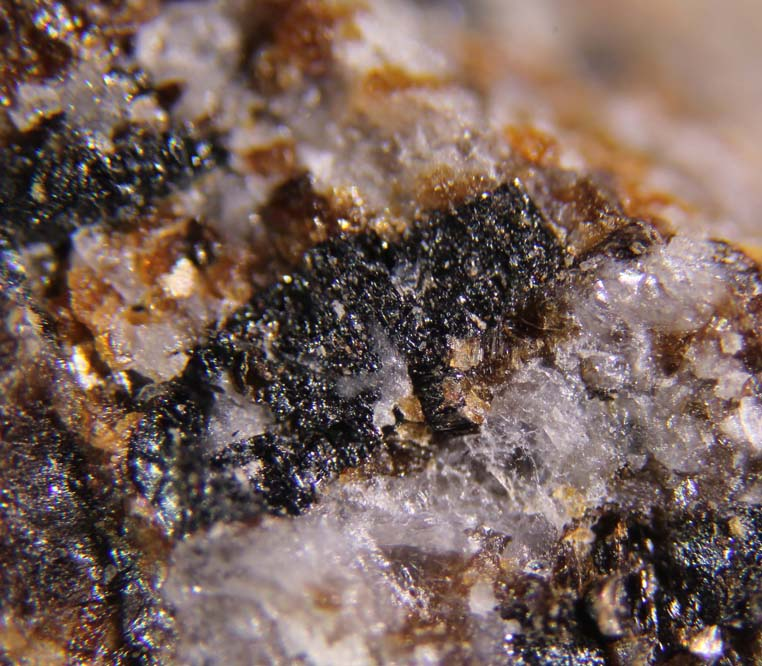
- Magnetoplumbite from Langban (Sweden)

General
- Category: Minerals
- Formula: Pb(Fe,Mn)_{12}O_{19}
- IMA symbol: Mpl
- Strunz classification: 4.CC.45
- Dana classification: 7.4.2.1
- Crystal system: Hexagonal

Identification
- Color: Grey-black
- Luster: Sub-Metallic
- Streak: Dark brown
- Diaphaneity: Opaque

Magnetoplumbite is an iron- and lead based oxide mineral. It is member of the magnetoplumbite group of minerals. Its type locality is Långban, Sweden
