= Amakinite =

Hydroxide mineral

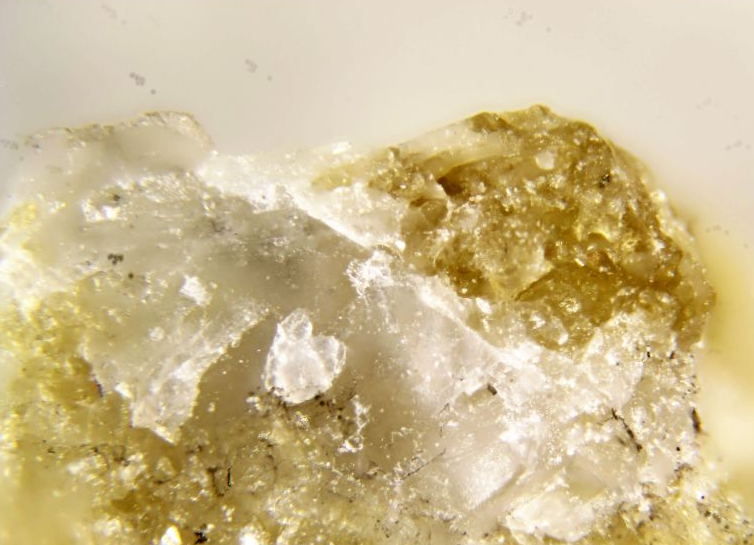
- Amakinite

General
- Category: Minerals
- IMA symbol: Amk
- Crystal system: Trigonal

Identification
- Color: Pale green to yellow-green; rapidly turns brown when exposed to air, due to formation of Fe(OH)3
- Cleavage: Poor/Indistinct
- Fracture: Irregular/Uneven
- Mohs scale hardness: 3.5-4
- Specific gravity: 2.925 - 2.98
- Optical properties: Uniaxial

Amakinite (IMA symbol: Amk) is a semi transparent yellow-green hydroxide mineral belonging to the brucite group that was discovered in 1962. Its chemical formula is written as (Fe^{2+},Mg)(OH)_{2}. It usually occurs in the form of splotchy, anhedral crystals forming within a group or structure in other minerals or rocks, such as kimberlite (occurring in diamond-rich eruptive pipe). Its composition is as follows:

- Magnesium 5.82% Mg 9.66% MgO
- Manganese 6.58% Mn 8.50% MnO
- Iron 46.84% Fe 60.26% FeO
- Hydrogen 2.42% H 21.58% H_{2}O
- Oxygen 38.34% O

Amakinite is slightly magnetic and was named for the Amakin Expedition, which prospected the diamond deposits of Yakutia in the Russian Far East.
