= Zaïrite =

Mineral

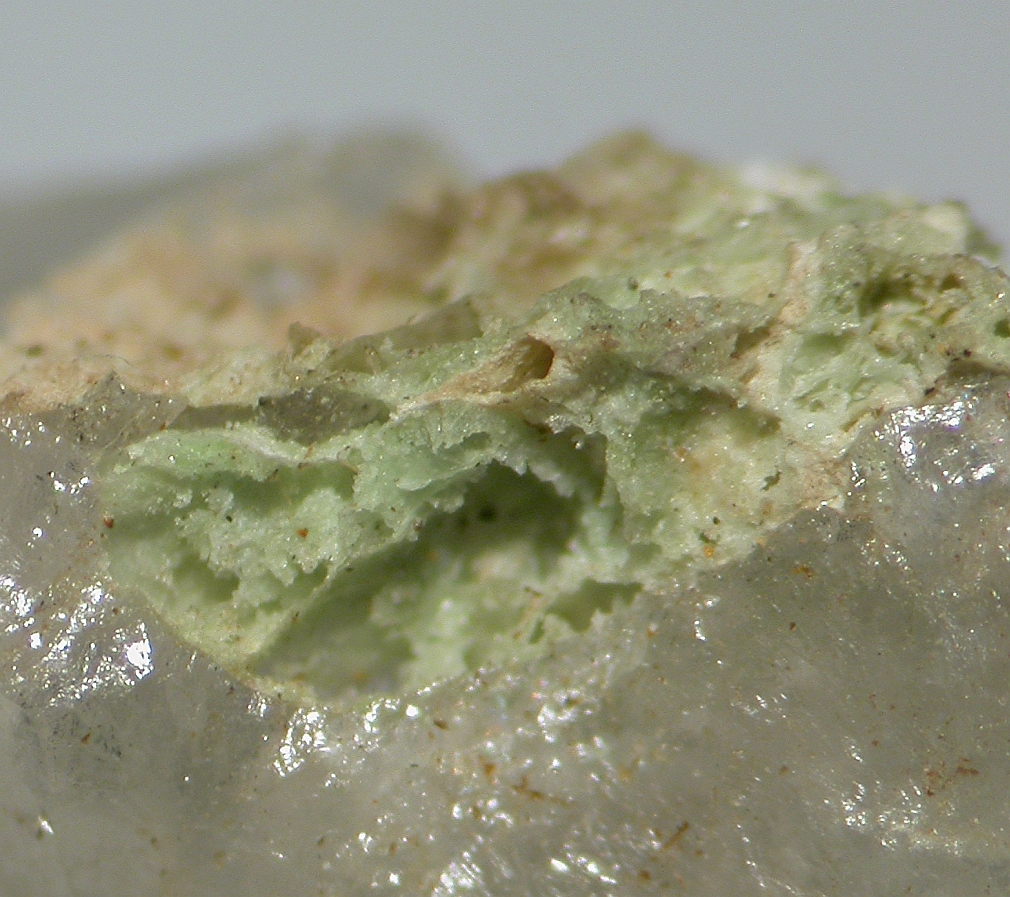
- Zaïrite from Eta-Etu, Kivu, Democratic Republic of Congo (Zaïre), (field of view 6 mm)

General
- Category: Phosphate minerals
- Formula: Bi(Fe^{3+},Al)_{3}[(OH)_{6}|(PO_{4})_{2}]
- IMA symbol: Zaï
- Strunz classification: 8.BL.13
- Crystal system: Trigonal
- Crystal class: Hexagonal scalenohedral (3̅m); H-M symbol: (3̅ 2/m)
- Space group: R3̅m
- Unit cell: a = 7.015, c = 16.365 [Å]; Z = 3

Identification
- Formula mass: 646.86 g/mol
- Color: Greenish, greenish white, yellow green.
- Cleavage: None observed
- Fracture: Irregular, uneven
- Tenacity: Brittle
- Mohs scale hardness: 4.5
- Luster: Vitreous, resinous
- Streak: White
- Diaphaneity: Transparent to translucent
- Specific gravity: 4.37
- Optical properties: Uniaxial(-)
- Refractive index: nω = 1.820 - 1.830 nε = 1.810
- Birefringence: δ = 0.0100-0.0200
- Other characteristics: Occurrence: Rare mineral in the weathering zone of quartz wolframite deposits

Zaïrite is a phosphate mineral with the chemical formula Bi(Fe^{3+},Al)_{3}[(OH)_{6}|(PO_{4})_{2}]. The name was given from where it was locally discovered in Eta-Etu, Kivu, Congo (Zaïre) in 1975.

== Properties ==
Zaïrite crystallizes in the trigonal crystal system, which means it contains three equal horizontal axes with angles of 120° between them. The mineral has a trigonal-hexagonal scalenohedron shape. Zairite belongs to the uniaxial optical class. It means the light and vibrations passing through the mineral only has one direction it follows and it travels at the same speed.

== Occurrence ==
The mineral was first described from the Eta-Etu district, northern Kivu Province, Democratic Republic of the Congo (then Zaire) usually in the weathering areas of quartz wolframite deposits where it occurs with native bismuth, bismutite, quartz and mica. Zaïrite is found in granite pegmatites, which are igneous coarse-grained rocks. It has also been reported from Kreuzberg Mountain in Upper Palatinate, Bavaria, Germany.
