= Nichromite =

Spinel mineral

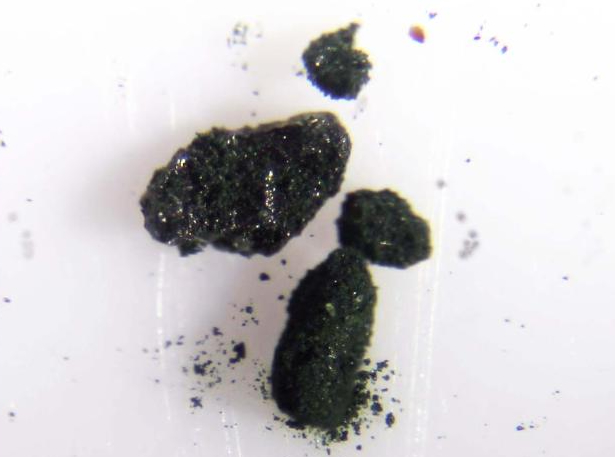

General
- Category: Spinel group
- Formula: (Ni,Co,Fe)(Cr,Fe,Al)_{2}O_{4}
- Strunz classification: 4.BB.05
- Crystal system: Isometric
- Crystal class: Hexoctahedral (m3̅m); H-M symbol: (4/m 3̅ 2/m)
- Space group: Fd3̅m
- Unit cell: a = 8.32 Å; V = 573.86 Å^{3}; Z = 8

Identification
- Color: Dark green, black
- Crystal habit: Granular, anhedral to subhedral
- Fracture: Conchoidal
- Mohs scale hardness: 6-6 1/2
- Luster: Metallic
- Streak: Greyish green
- Diaphaneity: Opaque
- Specific gravity: 5.10
- Optical properties: Isotropic

Nichromite (Ni,Co,Fe)(Cr,Fe,Al)_{2}O_{4} is a black cubic metallic mineral and member of the spinel group. Nichromite was originally reported from the Bon Accord nickel deposit in Barberton District, South Africa. Occurring naturally in a nickel deposit, nichromite is named for chromite with dominant nickel.

The atomic arrangement of the spinel group is a commonly studied structure and characteristically has four closely packed oxygen atoms. The nickel atoms are organized corresponding to a "normal" spinel arrangement.

The mineral has only been found in the Bon Accord Nickel Deposit in South Africa where it is formed by replacing chromite and rimmed by trevorite.
