= Challacolloite =

Chloride mineral

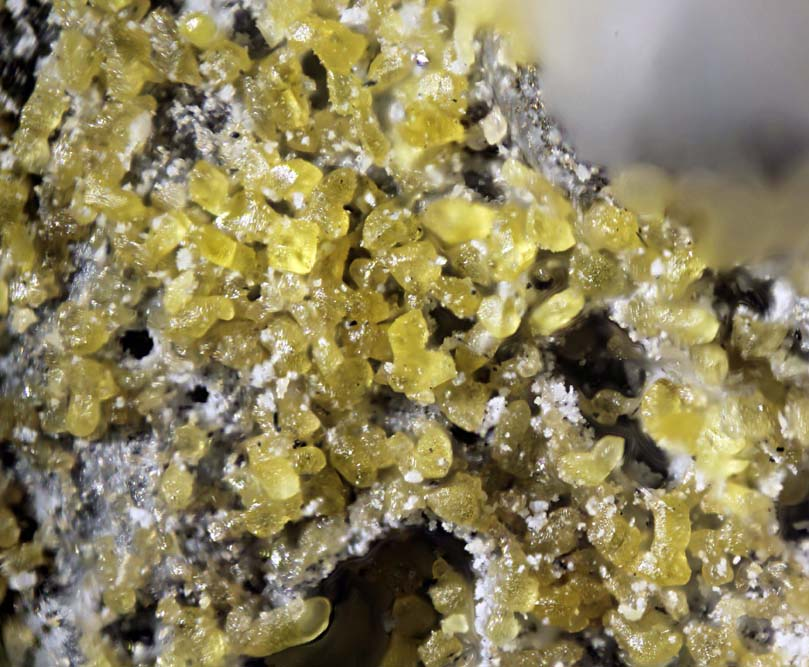
- Honey yellow Challacolloite crystals from the famous locality of La Fossa Crater (Vulcano Island, Aeolian Islands, Sicily, Italy)

General
- Category: Minerals
- Formula: KPb_{2}Cl_{5}
- IMA symbol: Chc
- Strunz classification: 3.AA.55 (10th)
- Dana classification: 11.4.2.1
- Crystal system: Monoclinic
- Crystal class: 2/m - Prismatic
- Unit cell: 878.2 Å³

Identification
- Formula mass: 630.83 gm
- Colour: Colourless to white
- Crystal habit: Aggregate
- Fracture: Brittle, subconchoidal fragments
- Mohs scale hardness: 2-3
- Luster: Adamantine/Greasy
- Streak: White
- Specific gravity: 4.77 (Calculated)
- Density: 4.77 g/cm3 (Calculated)
- Optical properties: Biaxial (+), a=2.004, b=2.01, g=2.024, bire=0.0200
- Refractive index: nα = 2.004 nβ = 2.010 nγ = 2.024
- 2V angle: 67° (calculated)

Challacolloite, KPb_{2}Cl_{5}, is a rare halide mineral. It crystallizes in the monoclinic system (with space group P2_{1}/c) and occurs as white fumarolic encrustations on lava. It occurs as intergrowths with cotunnite.

It was first described from a finding at the Challacollo Mine, Iquique, Chile and thereafter identified in specimens from the 1855 Mount Vesuvius eruption and from the Kudryavyi volcano in the Kuriles and also from the Satsuma-Iwojima volcano in Japan. It was recognized as a valid mineral species by the IMA (International Mineralogical Association) in 2005.

Artificially grown KPb_{2}Cl_{5} crystals are used for lasers.
