= Malhmoodite =

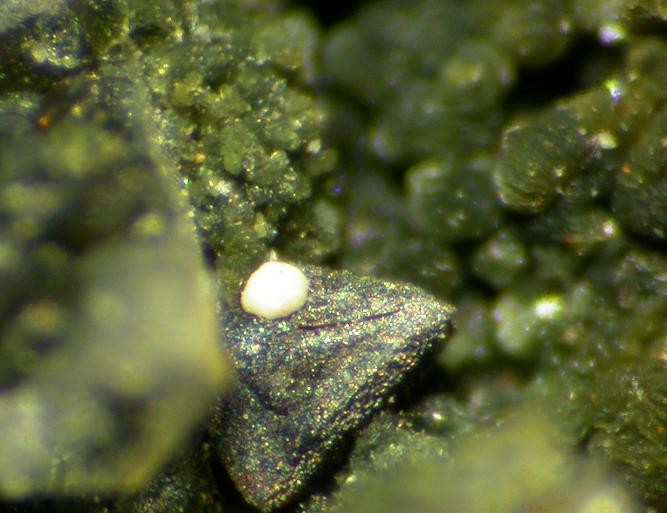
- Malhmoodite.Locality: Kerriack Cove, Porthtowan Area, St Agnes District, Cornwall, England, UK. Yellowish-white sphere on matrix. Field of view 2 mm.

General
- Category: Phosphate
- Formula: FeZr(PO_{4})·4H_{2}O
- IMA symbol: Mmo
- Strunz classification: 7/C.09-35
- Crystal system: Monoclinic
- Unit cell: a = 9.12 Å b = 5.42 Å c = 19.17 Å β= 94.81°

Identification
- Formula mass: 409.07
- Color: Creamy-white
- Crystal habit: Spherules
- Tenacity: Radiating fibers
- Mohs scale hardness: 3
- Luster: Silky
- Density: 2.877 g/cm^{3}
- Optical properties: Biaxial negative
- Refractive index: n_{α} = 1.640 n_{β} = 1.652 n_{γ} = 1.652
- Birefringence: δ = 0.012
- Dispersion: Relatively weak

Malhmoodite is a phosphate mineral first discovered at a mine called Union Carbide in Wilson Springs, Arkansas, United States. This mine is 10 km west of Magnet Cove, an alkaline igneous complex, and Union Carbide is in a contact region of alkalic igneous rocks and surrounding sedimentary rocks. The mineral has been approved by the Commission on New Minerals and Mineral Names, IMA, to be named for the late Bertha K. Malhmood, the Administrative Assistant of the Branch of Analytical Laboratories, U.S. Geological Survey.

== Occurrence ==
Malhmoodite occurs perched on kolbeckite plates and seems to be the last deposited in the cavities it occurs. The mineral is very rare, with the only common place to find it in Wilson Springs. However, a few other specimens have been found in Belgium and England.

== Physical properties ==
Malhmoodite is a creamy-white mineral with a silky luster. It exhibits a 3 on the Mohs hardness scale. The spherules of Malhmoodite are made up of thin, flat, radiating, optically homogeneous crystals and seem to form in a parallel extinction and positive elongation. The cores of the spherules appear to be loose material, making up about one-third to one-half of the radius of the spherule. However, the core seems to show higher amounts of Si than the rest of the spherule by using X-ray spectra. The fibers of the mineral are soft and the density could not be directly measured. It was instead calculated using the unit-cell content of four formula units and determined to be 2.877 g/cm^{3}. In the crystal structure work of Malhmoodite, it was found that there was a common [Zr(PO_{4})_{2}]^{2-} layer. It is considered a pseudohexagonal with orthorhombic dimensions.

== Optical properties ==
Malhmoodite is biaxial negative. The refractive indices are: α = 1.640, β = 1.652, and γ = 1.652 (Na). Dispersion is relatively weak.

== Chemical properties ==
Malhmoodite was examined using energy-dispersive X-ray spectra from a scanning electron microscope to show that the mineral contained major amounts of Zr and P, a moderate amount of Fe, but also some minute amounts of Ca, Si, and Ti. However, because of malhmoodite's small size and rarity, it could not be determined chemically by macroscopic tools. X-ray powder data brought the most information about the formulation and then was combined with the elemental information from the scanning electron microscope. The mineral has been attempted to be synthesized in a lab multiple times, but there has been no success. The average composition from the examined malhmoodite grains are listed in the table below. It was collected from 25 analyses. The H_{2}O was by difference and likely reduced by the vacuum when examining the samples. The numbers in the parentheses after the weight percent is the standard deviation.

Oxide	Wt%	Mole Ratios
P_{2}O_{5}	36.2(9)	2.01
ZrO_{2}	28.7(6)	0.91
TiO_{2}	0.7(1)	0.03
Al_{2}O_{3}	0.3(1)	0.02
FeO	16.1(8)	0.88
MnO	0.8(2)	0.04
CaO	1.3(5)	0.09
MgO	0.26(6)	0.3
Na_{2}O	0.11(5)	0.03
SiO_{2}	0.3(2)	0.02
F	0.5(2)	
H_{2}O	(14.7)	3.2
Total	(100.0)	---

== X-ray crystallography ==
A single bundle of fibers was examined with a Gandolfi camera with CrKα radiation to detect reflections. Malhmoodite is in the monoclinic crystal system. The result was recorded as d = 1.52 Å. When compared with everything in the known database, there was no match. However, there was a resemblance to a number of other compounds with the type of formula of MZr(PO_{4})•4H_{2}O where M was equal to Mn, Ni, Co, Cu, and Zn. However, in that grouping before examining Malhmoodite, there was never Fe in the M spot.

== See also ==
- List of Minerals
