= Penikisite =

Mineral

General
- Category: Phosphate mineral Bjarebyite group
- Formula: Ba(Mg,Fe,Ca)Al_{2}(PO_{4})_{2}(OH)_{3}
- IMA symbol: Pks
- Strunz classification: 8.BH.20
- Crystal system: Monoclinic
- Space group: P2_{1}/m

Identification

Penikisite was discovered by Alan Kulan and Gunar Penikis near Rapid Creek, Yukon Territory. The mineral is a member of the bjarebyite group along with kulanite, ideally BaFe^{2+}_{2}Al_{2}(PO_{4})_{3}(OH)_{3}, and bjarebyite, ideally BaMn^{2+}_{2}Al_{2}(PO_{4})_{3}(OH)_{3}. It is among several new minerals that have been discovered in the Rapid Creek and Big Fish areas of Yukon Territory. Kulanite is similar in many ways to penikisite in appearance and properties. The chemical formula for penikisite is Ba(Mg,Fe,Ca)Al_{2}(PO_{4})_{2}(OH)_{3}. It has a hardness of about 4 and a density of 3.79 g/cm^{3}. Penikisite is unique among the bjarebyite group in being monoclinic and has a biaxial optical class. It comes in shades of blue and green and, when rubbed on a streak plate, is pale green to white in color. Although penikisite and kulanite both range from blue to green, penikisite zones are easily distinguishable from kulanite zones in kulanite-penikisite crystals because they are lighter than the darker kulanite in color. Penikisite is a phosphate and is different from kulanite in that it is a magnesium-rich phosphate whereas kulanite is an iron-rich phosphate.

== Introduction ==
Penikisite, ideally Ba(Mg,Fe,Ca)Al_{2}(PO_{4})_{2}(OH)_{3}, is a second occurrence of kulanite. Both kulanite and penikisite are members of the bjarebyite group. Minerals in the bjarebyite group have the general formula XY_{2}Z_{2}(PO_{4})_{3}(OH)_{3} where X=Ba, Y=Mg,Fe^{2+},Mn^{2+}, and Z=Al,Fe^{3+}. Penikisite was found in a Yukon phosphate deposit near Rapid Creek. The mineral, along with kulanite, occurs in an iron-formation. In these iron-formations, Mg-rich zones were discovered and named penikisite in honor of Gunar Penikis who discovered these phosphate occurrences with Alan Kulan.

== Composition ==
The chemical formula of penikisite is Ba(Mg,Fe,Ca)Al_{2}(PO_{4})_{2}(OH)_{3}. Mandarino and Sturman analyzed two penikisite samples and eight kulanite samples using an AMX electron miscroprobe (1977). Their study showed weight percent oxides, including H_{2}O, that help determine what the formula is for penikisite and kulanite. Members of the bjarebyite group have the general formula XY_{2}Z_{2}(PO_{4})_{3}(OH)_{3} where X=Ba, Y=Mg,Fe(2+),Mn(2+), and Z=Al,Fe^{3+}. Accompanying penikisite in this group are as follows: bjarebyite, ideally BaMn^{2+}_{2}Al_{2}(PO_{4})_{3}(OH)_{3}, perloffite, ideally BaMn^{2+}_{2}Fe^{3+}_{2}(PO_{4})_{3}(OH)_{3}, kulanite, BaFe^{2+}_{2}Al_{2}(PO_{4})_{3}(OH)_{3}, and johntomaite, ideally BaFe^{2+}_{2}Fe^{3+}_{2}(PO_{4})_{3}(OH)_{3}. These minerals are identified when Ba in the X position is one of the most abundant elements in their composition along with being phosphates.

== Physical properties ==
Penikisite ranges from blue to green with a vitreous luster and, when rubbed along a streak plate, can be pale green to white. Depending on the thickness of the sample, the mineral can be either transparent or translucent. Penikisite is monoclinic with space group P2_{1}/m. The cell dimensions of this mineral were calculated by Mandarino and Sturman (1977) by least-squares refinement of the X-ray powder diffraction data to be: a 8.999, b 12.069, c 4.921Å. The mineral is non-fluorescent under short- and long-waves. It has a harness of about 4 and a density of 3.79(2) g/cm^{3}. There are two fair to good cleavages on {010} and {100}. Penikisite is biaxial (+) with nα 1.684(2), nβ 1.688(2), nγ 1.705(2). The 2V(γ) calculation is 56° and the 2V measurement is 52.2°. The pleochroism for penikisite is X grass-green, Y blue-green, Z pale pink. The absorption is X~Y>Z.

== Geologic occurrence ==
In recent years, Rapid Creek, in the northeastern corner of Yukon Territory, has become more popular in the mineralogist community. This is because of the large deposit of phosphate minerals that have been discovered in the area. Texturally, the rocks of Rapid Creek are similar to other Phanerozoic phosphate and iron deposits; they are composed of pellets and granules, detrital quarts grains, skeletal fragments, and siderite mud matrix. Discovered in phosphate-ironstones that crop out near Rapid Creek, penikisite and kulanite occurs in fractures in a sideritic iron-formation.
