= Ransomite =

Sulfate mineral

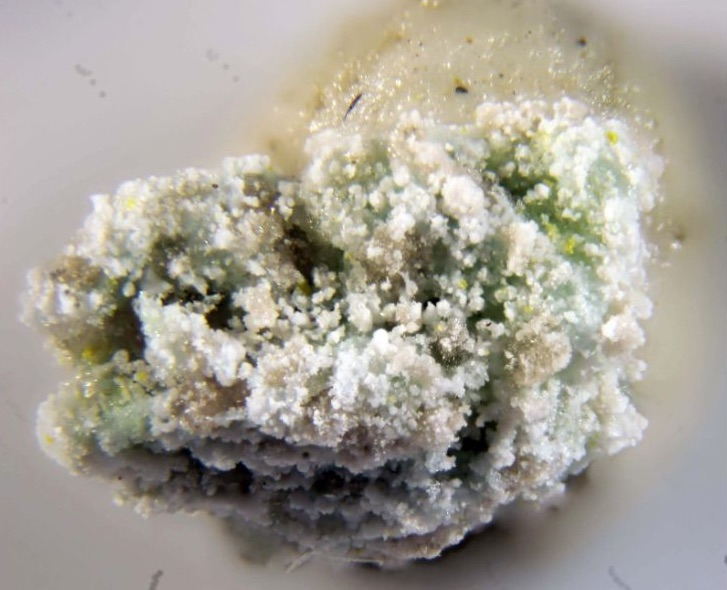

General
- Category: Sulfate
- Formula: CuFe2(SO4)_{4}·6H_{2}O
- Crystal system: Monoclinic
- Crystal class: 2/m - Prismatic
- Space group: P2_{1}/m
- Unit cell: a = 4.811 Å, b = 16.217 Å c = 10.403 Å; β= 93.01°; Z = 2

Identification
- Formula mass: 667.59
- Color: Bright sky blue; pale blue in transmitted light
- Crystal habit: needle-like crystals
- Cleavage: Perfect along {010}
- Tenacity: Radiating tufts and crusts
- Mohs scale hardness: 2.5
- Luster: Vitreous, pearly cleavage
- Diaphaneity: Transparent
- Density: 2.632 g/cm^{3}
- Optical properties: Biaxial positive
- Refractive index: n_{α}= 1.631 n_{β}= 1.643 n_{γ}= 1.695
- Birefringence: δ = 0.064
- Dispersion: v > r strong

Ransomite is a sulfate mineral first discovered at the United Verde mine in Jerome Arizona. This mineral was formed as a result of a mine fire. The United Verde mine is one of few places in the world where Ransomite can be found. This mineral can be described as a soluble sulfate that forms needle-like crystals and has a pale blue color in transmitted light. This mineral was named by Carl B. Lausen as a tribute to Frederick Leslie Ransome. Ransome was an American mining geologist who worked at the California Institute of Technology, the University of Arizona and the United states Geological Survey.

== Occurrence ==
Ransomite is found in association with pyrite, voltaite, and romerite. These minerals can be found in Campbell shaft, Arizona. Ransomite tends to form in the cavities of crushed up rock in these different mines. In these cavities, Ransomite forms small radiating crystals and pale-blue crusts.

== Physical properties ==
Ransomite is a bright sky blue or a pale blue in transmitted light, transparent mineral with a vitreous, pearly luster. It exhibits a hardness of 2.5 on the Mohs hardness scale. Ransomite occurs as needle-like crystals and has radiating tufts and crusts. Ransomite has perfect cleavage along the {010} plane. The specific gravity is 2.632 g/cm^{3}.

== Optical properties ==
Ransomite is biaxial positive, this means it can refract light on two axes. The refractive indices are: α ~ 1.631, β ~ 1.643, and γ ~ 1.695 (Na). Dispersion is strong, v > r. Ransomite has a max birefringence of 0.064 and has a moderate surface relief.

== Chemical properties ==
Ransomite is a sulfate that has a similar formula to the mineral Cuprocopiapite. Cuprocopiapite has a specific gravity of (2.23 g cm_{−3}), which is close to the value of Ransomite.

== Chemical composition ==
Oxide	wt%
SO_{3}	46.30
Al_{3}O_{3}	1.52
Fe_{2}O_{3}	22.57
CuO	11.29
H_{2}O	18.82
Total	100.50

== X-ray crystallography ==
Ransomite is in the monoclinic crystal system. The space group associated with Ransomite is P2_{1}/b with unit cell dimensions: a = 4.811Å, b = 16.217Å, c = 10.403Å; β= 93.01°; Z=2. Ransomite has a point group of 2/m and is prismatic. It also has skinny prisms extended parallel to the c axis.
