= Nekrasovite =

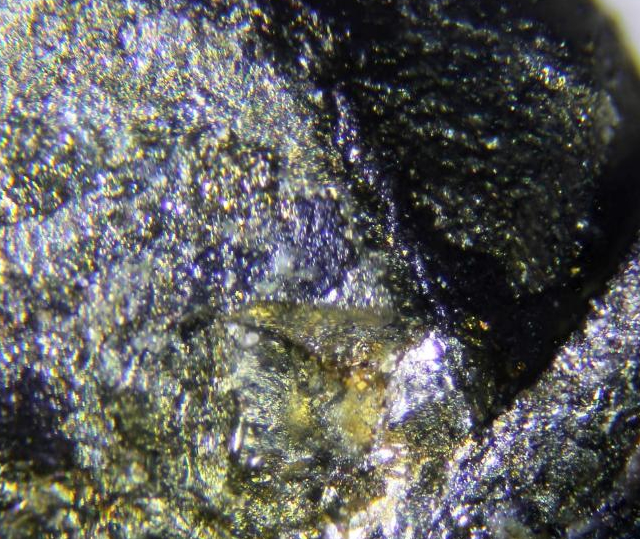
- Nekrasovite

General
- Category: Minerals
- Formula: Cu_{26}V_{2}(Sn,As,Sb)_{6}S_{32}

Identification
- Color: Brown
- Mohs scale hardness: 4.5
- Diaphaneity: Opaque
- Specific gravity: 4.62

See Nekrasov Cossacks for another meaning

Nekrasovite is a rare copper vanadium sulfosalt mineral with formula Cu_{26}V_{2}(Sn,As,Sb)_{6}S_{32}. It crystallizes in the isometric system and occurs as small grains in ore aggregates. It is a brown opaque metallic mineral with Mohs hardness of 4.5 and a specific gravity of 4.62.

It was first described in 1984 in the Kayragach (Qayragʻoch) Au-Te ore deposit, Ohangaron District, Tashkent Region, eastern Uzbekistan and named for Russian mineralogist Ivan Yakovlevich Nekrasov.
