= List of minerals (synonyms) =

The International Mineralogical Association (IMA) is the international group that recognises new minerals and new mineral names. However, minerals discovered before 1959 did not go through the official naming procedure although some minerals published previously have been either confirmed or discredited since that date.

- Abbreviations:
  - "*" – discredited (IMA/CNMNC status).
  - "?" – questionable/doubtful (IMA/CNMNC, mindat.org or mineralienatlas.de status).
  - ^{N} – published without approval of the IMA/CNMNC.
  - ^{I} – intermediate member of a solid-solution series.
  - ^{H} – hypothetical mineral (synthetic, anthropogenic, etc.)
    - ^{ch} – incomplete description, hypothetical solid solution end member.
  - group – a name used to designate a group of species, sometimes only a mineral group name.
  - no – no link available.
  - red. – redefinition of ...
  - Y: 1NNN – year of publication.
  - Y: old – known before publications were available.

== List of main synonyms ==
Mainly renamed minerals and synonyms used by the Handbook of Mineralogy.

=== A–E ===
- A
  - Andorite IV: Quatrandorite; arrojadite-(BaFe): sigismundite;
- B
  - Boldyrevite: UM1941-01-F:AlCaHMgNa; Britholite-(Ce): Lessingite-(Ce)
- C
  - Chrysotile: Bostonite, Cyphoîte, Karystiolite, Krysolith, Kuphoite, Kupholite, Lefkasbestos, Picrosmine, Pikrosmin, Schweizerite, Ishkildite (var.);
- D
- E
  - Epidote-(Pb): Hancockite;

=== F–L ===
- F
  - Fraipontite: Zinalsite; Ferro-Ferritschermakite: Ferri-Ferrotschermakite;
- G
  - Gagarinite-(Ce): Zajacite-(Ce)
- H
  - Helvine: helvite; hinsdalite: orpheite; hydrokenoelsmoreite: alumotungstite, ferritungstite; hisingerite: sturtite;
- I
- J
  - Johnbaumite-M: fermorite, Jadeite;
- K
  - Karpatite: pendletonite (CNMMN, 1971), carpathite and coronene
- L
  - Litidionite: lithidionite

=== M–R ===
- M
  - Manganohörnesite: manganese-hörnesite
- N
  - Natrozippeite: sodium-zippeite; natroboltwoodite: sodium-boltwoodite;
- O
  - Osmium: iridosmine (var.);
- P
  - Pyrosmalite-Fe: Ferropyrosmalite
- Q
  - Qingheiite: Qinghelite; Qitianlingite: Qitianglinite; Quartz: Azetulite, Azeztulite, Dragonite, Konilite, Lodolite, Quartz-alpha, Quertz; Quartz varieties: Agate, Amberine, Amethyst, Ametrine, Apricotine, Aventurine, Azurchalcedony, Basanite, Bayate, Beekite, Binghamite, Bloodstone, Buhrstone, Carnelian, Chalcedony, Chert, Chrysojasper, Citrine, Cotterite, Creolite, Cubosilicite, Dallasite, Damsonite, Darlingite, Diackethyst, Eisenkiesel, El Doradoite, Flint, Haytorite, Herbeckite, Irnimite, Jasper, Kinradite, Myrickite, Onyx, Pastelite, Prase, Prasiolite, Quartzine, Quetzalitztli, Ribbonstone, Sard, Sardonyx, Schwimmstein, Seftonite
- R
  - Rutile: Cajuelite, Crispite, Dicksbergite, Edisonite, Gallitzinite, Paraedrite, Rutilite, Titankalk, Titanschorl; Rutile varieties: Ilmenorutile, Lusterite, Nigrine, Struverite; Römerite: Bückingite, Louderbackite, Roemerite;

=== S–Z ===
- S
  - Stibiconite: hydroroméite; smolyaninovite: smolianinovite; sofiite: sophiite;
- T
  - Tadzhikite-(Ce): Tadzhikite-(Y); tantalite-(Fe): ferrotantalite; tantalite-(Mn): manganotantalite
- U
  - Uzonite: Usonite;
- V
  - Veatchite-p: P-Veatchite;
- W
- X
  - Xanthoconite: Rittingerite, Xanthocone; Xonotlite: Calcium-Pectolite, Eakleite, Xenotlite, Xonaltite, Xonolite
- Y
  - Yttrotungstite-(Ce): Cerotungstite-(Ce)
- Z

== Mineral varieties ==
Mainly minerals varieties used by the Handbook of Mineralogy.

1. Iridosmine*, an osmium variety, 01.AF.05
2. Plagioclase solid solution series:
  1. An0: albite; An20: oligoclase; An40: andesine; An60: labradorite; An80: bytownite; An100: anorthite
  2. Oligoclase, albite variety, 09.FA.35
  3. Andesine, albite variety, 09.FA.35
  4. Labradorite, anorthite variety, 09.FA.35
  5. Bytownite, anorthite variety, 09.FA.35
3. Ilmenorutile, a rutile variety, 04.DB.05
4. Incaite*, a franckeite variety, 02.HF.25b
5. Kamacite, a native iron variety, 01.AE.05
6. Kerolite* (discredited 1979), a Ni-bearing variety of talc (?), 09.EC.05, [no]
7. Lewistonite* (discredited 1978), a carbonate-rich variety of fluorapatite, 08.BN.05 [no]
8. Metaberyllite* (Y: 1973, discredited 2006), a variety of beryllite, 09.AE.05, [no]
9. Potosiite*, a franckeite variety, 02.HF.25b
10. Sakharovaite* (Y: 1956, discredited 2006), a Bi-bearing variety of jamesonite, 02.HB.15,
11. Struverite*, a rutile variety, 04.DB.05

=== Doubtful procedures ===
==== Unnamed minerals, controversial discreditations ====
- Wolframoixiolite, a W-bearing variety of ixiolite, 04.DB.25; possibly a separate species.

- Scandian ixiolite (of von Knorring)^{N}, a Nb-bearing variety of ixiolite, 04.DB.25; possibly a separate species.
- Scandian ixiolite (of Bergstol)^{N}, a Sc-bearing variety of ixiolite, 04.DB.25; possibly a separate species.

- Ktenasite (Y: 1950) 07.DD.20, possibly a mineral group, under review (Leverett et al., 2009–2011).

- Unnamed (Zn-analogue of Ktenasite)^{N}.
- Unnamed (Co-analogue of Ktenasite)^{N}.
- Mg- or Cd-bearing varieties are also known.

- Loparite-(Ce) (Y: 1923) 04.CC.35, possibly a mineral group

- Mitchell R H, Burns P C, Chakhmouradian A R (2000) The crystal structures of loparite-(Ce), The Canadian Mineralogist 38, 145-152.
- Zubkova, N. V., Arakcheeva, A. V., Pushcharovskii, D. Y., Semenov, E. I., & Atencio, D. (2000). Crystal structure of loparite. Crystallography Reports, 45(2), 210-214.

- Calciogadolinite-Y? (Y: 1938) might be a calcian gadolinite.
- Clinotyrolite^{N} (monoclinic), both minerals might belong to a mineral group since tyrolite was shown to be monoclinic (pseudo-orthorhombic).
- Yttromicrolite-(Y) within the framework of nomenclature of Hogarth (1977): discreditation was not made by proper way (in the course of defamation of Crook, 1982).
- Pimelite* (Y: 1800, 1938) a nickel dominant smectite, is under review. Associations: nickel-bearing talc, yellow green nickeloan nontronite, red brown hematite stained nontronite, bright white montmorillonite.
- Tetranatrolite (discredited in 1999): might be identical to gonnardite, discreditation procedure apparently done without actually working on the type specimen or on any identified tetranatrolite itself.
- Yftisite-(Y) (discredited in 1987): but apparently the cell parameters are known (Balko & Bakakin, 1975).
- Buserite (IMA1970-024): dehydrates to birnessite, known synthetic compound.
- Zincobotryogen: it is discredited (IMA1967 s.p.) but its crystal structure has been solved (space group 14).
- Strontioborite: it is discredited (IMA1962 s.p.) but its crystal structure has been solved (space group 4).
- Aguilarite (Y: 1944, Ag_{4}SeS, 2.BA.55): it might be two solid solution series, a monoclinic 'acanthite-like' series (from Ag_{2}S - Ag_{2}S_{0.4}Se_{0.6}), and an orthorhombic 'naumannite-like' series (from Ag_{2}S_{0.3}Se_{0.7} - Ag_{2}Se).

==== Controversial chemical formulas (IMA Master List) ====
(and/or possible "analytical" artifacts)
- Kobeite-Y (Y: 1950) 04.DG.05, the original analytical determinations contain between 14.91% and 17.08% ZrO_{2} with only 1.99% and 1.59% SiO_{2} respectively. The chemical formula (IMA version: (Y,U)(Ti,Nb)_{2}(O,OH)_{6}) doesn't contain Zr.

- Pavel Kartashov:
- If no Zr and U>Th then euxenite group, polycrase
- If no Zr and U<Th then aeschynite group, priorite, blomastrandin.

- Divalent sulfide. Mackinawite (Y: 1963) 02.CC.25 (IMA formula: (Fe,Ni)_{1+x}S ($\scriptstyle 0\leq x\leq 0.07$)), sulfide anion (atoms per formula unit, apfu) might be too low due to analytical losses.
- Pseudo monovalent mercury, mindat.org changed the chemical formulas: there is mercury(II) and (dimercury) [Hg-Hg] now.
Notes:
- Claraite (IMA2016-L, IMA1981-023) 05.DA.30 (IMA formula: Cu^{2+}_{3}CO_{3}(OH)_{4}·4H_{2}O), but after U. Kolitsch it has essential As and S.

- Kolitsch, U. & Brandstätter, F. (2012): 1743) Baryt, Chalkophyllit und Clarait vom Pengelstein bei Kitzbühel, Tirol. P. 149. in Niedermayr, G. et al. (2012): Neue Mineralfunde aus Österreich LX. Carinthia II, 202./122., 123-180.
- Putz, H., Lechner, A. & Poeverlein, R. (2012): Erythrin und Clarait vom Pichlerstollen am Silberberg bei Rattenberg, Nordtirol. Lapis, 37 (1), 47-52; 62.
- New chemical formula: (Cu,Zn)_{15}(CO_{3})_{4}(AsO_{4})_{2}(SO_{4})(OH)_{14}·7H_{2}O.

- Cosalite (Y: 1868) 02.JB.10 (IMA formula: Pb_{2}Bi_{2}S_{5}). It might have copper as essential constituent (AM Clark, MH Hey (1993) Hey's mineral index: mineral species, varieties and synonyms), (Zak, L.; Megarskaya, L.; Mumme, W. G. (1992). "Rezbanyite from Ocna de fier (Vasko): a mixture of bismuthinite derivatives and cosalite". Neues Jahrbuch für Mineralogie. Monatshefte 1992: 69–79.).

- The general structural formula for cosalite can be expressed as: Cu_{x}Ag_{(i + s)}Pb_{[8–2s–0.5(x + i)]}Bi_{(8 + s)}S_{20}.

- Mayenite (IMA2013-C, IMA1963-016): it can not be found in nature. Mayenite (stabilized by moisture) can be found in cement industry chemistry. Chlormayenite can be found in nature.

==== Suspended (IMA status) ====
- (IMA2000-026) (Mn,Li)_{4}(Ta,Sn)_{4}(Ta,Nb)_{8}O_{32}: IMA approval status is suspended, but it was incorrectly stated as approved in Grice, J.D. & Ferraris, G. (2001).
- (IMA1989-012), zhangpeishanite (of Shen), unnamed (cordylite-like (Ca□Ba_{2}Ce_{4}[CO_{3}]_{8}F_{2}).

==== Grandfathered (IMA valid species) ====
- Chrysocolla? (Theophrastus, 315 BC), it's suggested that it is mixture of spertiniite (Cu(OH)_{2}) and chalcedony or opal, it has similarities with copper-bearing allophane.
- Loranskite-(Y) (Y: 1899) it might be a fictional mineral, the type material is probably a mixture of euxenite and zircon.

=== Rejected or discredited minerals ===
- Possibly non-valid: bismutostibiconite, lazurite and lonsdaleite.
- Arsenosulvanite^{D}
  - Probably colusite.
- Carbonate-apatites:
  - Carbonate-rich fluorapatite (discredited 2008) 08.BN.05
  - Carbonate-rich hydroxylapatite (discredited 2008) 08.BN.05
- Chelyabinskite^{HQD} (Y: 1988, rejected 1986) 07.DG.45 [no]
  - Possibly identical to thaumasite.
- Churchite-(Nd)^{D} (Y: 1983, IMA1987 s.p., IMA2015-C) 08.CJ.50 [no]
- Dienerite^{D} (Y: 1944, discredited 2006) 02.??
  - It was reported as microinclusions in a sobolevite grain, Norilsk deposit (2006).
- Ferrorhodsite (spinel, linnaeite: IMA1996-047, discredited 2018) 02.DA.05 [no]
- Fluorarrojadite-(BaNa)^{N} 08.BF.?? (IMA2005 s.p., red.) [no] [no]
- Foshallasite^{D}
- Heliophyllite^{D} (Y: 1888) 03.DC.65
- Imgreite^{D} (discredited 1968) [no]
- Natrofairchildite^{D}
  - Probably nyerereite.
- Pseudo-autunite^{D} (Y: 1965) [no]
- Schirmerite^{D} (Y: 1874, redefined and discredited 2008) 02.JB.40d
- Spodiophyllite^{D} (IMA1998 s.p.)
  - Possibly a mica related to tainiolite: Canadian Mineralogist 36 (1998), 905.
- Strontioborite^{D} (Y: 1960) 06.FC.10
- Vondechenite^{D} (IMA2016-065) 03.
- Wellsite^{D} [no]
  - Either barian phillipsite-Ca or calcian harmotome.
- Zhonghuacerite-(Ce)^{D} (Y: 1982) 05.BD.10 [no]
  - Note: probably huanghoite-(Ce) or kukharenkoite-(Ce).

==== Errors and synonyms ====
- Ankangite^{D} (IMA1986-026) 04.DK.05
  - Synonym of mannardite (discredited in 2012: IMA 2011-F).
- Aniyunwiyaite^{D} (IMA2018-054) 08. [no] [no]
  - Synonym of kingsmountite.
- Annivite^{D} (tetrahedrite: IMA2018-K, IMA2008 s.p., 1854) 02.
- Basaluminite^{D}
  - Synonym of felsőbányaite.
- Bobdownsite^{D} (IMA2008-037, discredited 2017) 08.AC.45 [no]
  - Synonym of merrillite.
- Brabantite^{D} (Y: 1981, discredited 2007)
  - Synonym of cheralite.
- Brearleyite^{D} (IMA2013-C, IMA2010-062) 04.CC.20 [no] [no]
  - Synonym of chlormayenite.
- Cadmoxite^{D} (IMA2012-037) 04.AB.?? [no] [no]
  (IUPAC: Cadmium oxide)
  - The type material is uraninite: CNMNC Newsletter No. 17, October 2013
- Clinotyrolite^{D} (Y: 1980) 8.DM.10 [no]
  - Synonym of tangdanite.
- Cobaltogordaite^{D} (IMA2015-K, IMA2014-043) 07.D?. [no] [no]
  - Thérèsemagnanite got redefined, same as thérèsemagnanite now.
- Coeruleolactite^{D} (n/a) [no]
  - Turquoise group, discredited 2006.
- Chromo-alumino-povondraite (~~IMA2009-088~~, IMA2013-089 with new type material) 09.CK.05 [no] [no]
  - Former type material is chromdravite: CNMNC Newsletter No. 16, August 2013; Mineralogical Magazine, 77 (2013), 2695–2709.
- Diomignite^{D} (IMA2015-H, IMA1984-058a) 06.DD.05
  - Misidentification of zabuyelite.
- Eleonorite^{D} (beraunite: IMA2015-003) 8.0 [no] [no]
  - Synonym of beraunite.
- Endellite^{D} [no]
  - Halloysite-10Å
- Fejerite^{D} (IMA2012-014, IMA2015-L) 03.??. [no] [no]
  - Claringbullite got redefined, same as claringbullite now.
- Ferrotellurite^{D} (Y: 1877) 07.AB.10 [no] [no]
  Note: type material is keystoneite.
- Fluorthalénite-(Y) (IMA2014-D, IMA1994-022) 09.BJ.20 [no]
  - Thalénite-(Y) got redefined, same as thalénite-(Y) now.
- Freibergite^{D} (tetrahedrite: IMA2018-K, 1853) 02.GB.05
- Lesukite (IMA2018-H, IMA1996-004) 03.BD.10 [no]
  - It is cadwaladerite.
- Marianoite^{D} (discredited 2020, IMA2005-005a) 9.BE.17
  - It is wöhlerite.
- Orpheite^{D}
  - Identical to hinsdalite.
- Potassicmendeleevite-(Ce) (IMA2009-093, not approved) 09.??.
- Steedeite^{D} (IMA2010-049, approval withdrawn 2011) 09.CA.15 [no] [no]
  - Synonym of catapleiite.
- Surkhobite^{D} (IMA2007-A, IMA2006-E, IMA2002-037 Rd) 9.BE.67 [no]
  - Synonym of perraultite

==== Non minerals ====
- Ashanite^{D} [no]
  - Probably a mixture of several minerals including ixiolite, samarskite-(Y) and uranmicrolite.
- Boldyrevite^{D} (IMA2006-C, Y: 1941) 03.CF.10 [no]
  - It might be impure hydrokenoralstonite or gearksutite.
- Bursaite^{D} [no]
  - A mixture of two sulphosalts.
- Girdite^{D} (IMA2016-F, IMA1979-006) 04.JL.30
  - Two or more phases.
- Horsfordite^{D} (discredited IMA2006 s.p.) [no]
  - Smelter product, it has three phases.
- Iodine^{D} (Y: 1897, IMA2015-D) 01.AA.15 [no] [no]
  - Type specimen description states that it is only a vapour production.
- Parajamesonite^{D} (discredited 2007)
  - Either jamesonite or a mixture of jamesonite and argentian tetrahedrite (freibergite) and/or ramdohrite.
- Jeromite^{D}
  - An amorphous As-S-Se phase of variable composition.
- Merumite^{D}
  - A mixture of mainly eskolaite and bracewellite, grimaldiite, guyanaite and mcconnellite.
- Natromontebrasite^{D} (IMA2005-E)
  - A mixture of amblygonite, lacroixite and wardite.
- Partzite^{D} (IMA2016-B, IMA2013 s.p., 1867) 04.??.
  - A mixture of several phases, which include a member of the plumboroméite group and a chrysocolla-like amorphous phase.
- Percylite^{D} [no]
  - Mixture of boleite und pseudoboleite.
- Spodiosite^{D} (IMA2003-B, Y: 1872) [no]
  - A mixture of calcite, fluorapatite, serpentine group.
- Thorogummite^{D} (IMA2014-B, Y: 1889) 09.AD.30
  - Heterogeneous mixture of secondary, non-crystalline minerals, after the alteration, hydration, or metamictization of thorite.
- Tombarthite-(Y)^{D} (IMA2016-K, IMA1967-031) 09.AD.35
  - Many phases.
- Uhligite^{D} (IMA2006-C) 04.XX.??
  - Possibly impure perovskite or zirkelite.

==== Discredited mineral varieties ====
- Anatacamite^{D} (IMA2015-A, IMA2009-042) 03.DA.10d [no] [no]
  - Twinned clinoatacamite.
- Bakerite^{D} (IMA2016-A, Y: 1903) 09.AJ.20
  - Gadolinite supergroup, datolite group was reviewed.
- Cheralite-(Ce)^{D} [no]
  - Ca-rich monazite-(Ce).
- Fupingqiuite^{D} (IMA2016-087) 08. [no] [no]
  - Varulite variety.
- Hibschite^{D} (Y: 1906, IMA1983-B, voting proposal IMA2011-D) 09.AD.25
  - A variety of grossular.
- Hydrohetaerolite^{D} (Y: 1928, 2019 s.p.) 04.BB.10
  - A variety of hetaerolite.
- Luinaite-(OH)^{D} (distorted tourmaline: IMA2009-046, IMA21-L) 9.CK.05 [no] [no]
  - A variety of schorl
- Magniotriplite^{D} (IMA2003-C) [no]
  - A variety of wagnerite.
- Matraite^{D} (IMA2006-C)
  - A densely twinned columnar variety of sphalerite.
- Paraspurrite^{D} (IMA2009-B)
  - Polysynthetically microtwinned spurrite.
- Tellurocanfieldite^{D} (IMA2012-013, approval withdrawn)
  - Te-rich canfieldite.
- Viséite^{D}
  - Si-bearing crandallite.

==== Discredited polytypes ====
See polytype section

==== Groups and pairs ====
- Zinnwaldite^{G} (Y: 1845) 09.EC.20
  - A series between siderophyllite and polylithionite.
- Hydrophilite^{D} (discredited IMA2006 s.p.)
  - Its description is incomplete; it can be antarcticite as well as sinjarite.

==== Amphibole dump ====
Discredited, renamed and/or hypothetical amphiboles

- Aluminobarroisite^{D} (Y: 1978) 09.DE.20 [no]
  - Barroisite since 2012.
- Alumino-magnesiotaramite^{N} (IMA2006-024) 09.DE.20
  - It isn't an IMA approved mineral.
- Aluminotschermakite^{D} (Y: 1978) 09.DE.10 [no] [no]
  - Tschermakite since 2012.
- Cannilloite^{ch} (Y: 1997) 09.DE.10 [no] [no]
  (Ca_{3}(Mg_{4}Al)(Si_{5}A_{l3})O_{22}(OH)_{2})
- Clinoferroholmquistite^{ch} (Y: 1997) 09.DE.05 [no]
- Clinoholmquistite
- Ferribarroisite^{ch} (Y: 1997, 2012) 09.D? [no] [no]
- Ferric-nybøite^{ch} (Y: 1997) 09.DE.25 [no] [no]
- Ferri-ferrobarroisite (Y: 1918) 09.DE.20 [no]
- Ferri-ferrotschermakite (Y: 1918) 09.D?. [no]
- Ferrikaersutite (IMA2011-035) 09.?? [no] [no]
- Ferri-magnesiotaramite (Y: 1997) 09.DE.20 [no]
- Ferritschermakite^{ch} (Y: 1949) 09.DE.10 [no]
- Ferrobarroisite^{ch} (Y: 1978) 09.DE.20
- Ferro-eckermannite^{ch} (Y: 1964) 09.DE.25 [no]
- Ferrokaersutite^{ch} (Y: 1978) 09.DE.15
- Ferroleakeite^{ch} (Y: 1997) 09.DE.25 [no]
- Ferronybøite^{ch} (Y: 1997) 09.?? [no] [no]
- Ferropedrizite^{ch} (Y: 2003) 09.DE.25 [no] [no]
- Ferrowinchite^{ch} (Y: 1978) 09.DE.20 [no]
- Leakeite^{ch} (IMA2012 s.p., IMA1991-028 Rd) 09.DE.25
- Magnesiosadanagaite (IMA2002-051) 09.DE.15
- Magnesiotaramite (Y: 1978) 09.DE.20
- Manganocummingtonite^{ch} (Y: 1997) 09.DE.05 [no]
- Manganogrunerite^{ch} (Y: 1997) 09.DE.05
- Parvo-mangano-edenite (IMA2003-062) 09.DE.15 [no]
- Parvo-manganotremolite (IMA2004-045) 09.DE.10 [no]
- Pedrizite^{H} (Y: 2000) 09.DE.25 [no] [no]
- Permanganogrunerite^{H} (Y: 1997) 09.DE.05 [no]
- Potassic-aluminosadanagaite (Y: 2003) 09.?? [no] [no] [no]
- Protomangano-ferro-anthophyllite (IMA1986-007) 09.DD.05 [no]
- Sodicanthophyllite (Y: 1977) 09.DD.05 [no]
- Sodic-ferri-clinoferroholmquistite (IMA1995-045) 09.DE.25 [no]
- Sodic-ferro-anthophyllite^{ch} (Y: 1997) 09.DD.05 [no]
- Sodic-ferrogedrite^{ch} (Y: 1997) 09.DD.05 [no]
- Sodic-ferropedrizite^{ch} (Y: 2003) 09.DE.25 [no] [no]
- Sodicgedrite^{ch} (Y: 1997) 09.DD.05 [no]
- Sodicpedrizite^{ch} (Y: 2003) 09.DE.25 [no] [no]

== Polytypes ==
Based on Nickel (1993).

=== Synonyms, discredited polytypes ===
Under construction

- Barbertonite^{D} (discredited 2011)
  - Polytype of stichtite.
- Clinobarylite^{D} (IMA2013-E, IMA2002-015) 09.BB.15 [no]
  (IUPAC: Diberyllium barium sorosilicate, Si_{2}O_{7})
  - Polytype barylite-1O.
- Clinomimetite^{D} (Y: 1993) 08.BN.05
  - Polytype mimetite-M (discredited 2010, IMA1990-043a).
- Johnbaumite-M^{D}
  - Monoclinic polytype of johnbaumite.
- Lavinskyite-2O (IMA2012-028) 09.D? [no] [no]
  (Chemical formula: K(LiCu)Cu_{6}(Si_{4}O_{11})_{2}(OH)_{4})
  - Lavinskyite-1M (liguriaite, IMA2014-035) 09.D? [no] [no]
- Manasseite^{D} (2012, 1941) 05.DA.45
  (IUPAC: Hexamagnesium dialuminium carbonate hexadecahydroxyl tetrahydrate)
  - Polytype hydrotalcite-2H.
- Orthochamosite^{D} (Y: 1951) 09.EC.55 [no] [no]
  - Possibly a polytype of chamosite. Its formal discreditation was forgotten. It was on the IMA Master List (October 2008).
  - Quote: "the varietal names of brunsvigite, corundophilite, daphnite, delessite, diabantite, grovesite, kiimmererite, kotchubeite, leuchtenbergite, orthochamosite, pennine, pseudothuringite, pycnochlorite, ripidolite, sheridanite, talc-chlorite and thuringite should be discarded."
- Parabariomicrolite^{D} (IMA2016-C, IMA1984-003) 04.FJ.20
  - Polytype hydrokenomicrolite-3R.
- Sjögrenite^{D} (discredited 2012, 1941) 05.DA.45
  (IUPAC: Hexamagnesium diiron(III) carbonate hexadecahydroxyl tetrahydrate)
  - Polytype pyroaurite-2H.
- Balangeroite 9.DH.35
  - Polytypes: -2M and -1A.
- Bariopharmacosiderite 8.DK.10
  - Polytypes: -C and -Q.
- Barylite 9.BB.15
  - Polytypes: -1O and -2O.
- Berborite 6.AB.10
  - Polytypes: -2H , -1T , -2T
- Cayalsite-(Y) (IMA2011-094) 9.?? [no] [no]
  - Polytypes: -1M, -1O
- Chamosite 9.EC.55
  - Clinochamosite
  - Orthochamosite
- Chrysotile 9.ED.15 [none]
  - Clinochrysotile
  - Orthochrysotile
  - Parachrysotile
- Clinotobermorite 9.DG.10
  - Polytypes: -2M and -1A .
- Cualstibite (IMA1983-068) 4.FM.40
  (IUPAC: Pentacopper dialuminium triantimony(III) dodecaoxy hydroxyl dodecahydrate)
  - Cualstibite-1M* (syn. cyanophyllite, IMA1980-065, IMA2012-B)
  - Cualstibite-1T
- Dioskouriite (IMA2015-106)
  - Polytypes: -2M, -2O
- Ericssonite (IMA1966-013) 9.BE.25
  - Ericssonite-2M
  - Ericssonite-2O* (syn. orthoericssonite, IMA1970-005, IMA2010-F)
- Gageite 9.DH.35
  - Polytypes: -1A and -2M.
- Gersdorffite (1986 s.p. Rd) 2.EB.25
  (IUPAC: Nickel arsenide sulfide)
  - Gersdorffite-P2_{1}3 (Y: 1982, NiAsS)
  - Gersdorffite-Pa3 (Y: 1845, Ni(As,S)_{2})
  - Gersdorffite-Pca2_{1} (Y: 1982, NiAsS)
- Graphite 1.CB.05a
  - Polytypes: -2H, -3R
- Greenalite 9.ED.15
  - Polytypes: -1A, -1M, -2M1, -2Å, -3R, -3Å
- Hilgardite 6.ED.05
  - Hilgardite-1Tc
  - Hilgardite-3Tc
  - Hilgardite-4M
- Illite^{G} [none]
  - Polytypes: -1M , Illite1Md , -2M
- Ivanukite-Na
  - Ivanyukite-Na-C (IMA2007-041) (titanosilicate) [no]
  - Ivanyukite-Na-T (Y: 2009) (titanosilicate) [no]
- Kaolinite 9.ED.05
  - Dickite
  - Nacrite
- Khinite, broad sense 4.FD.30
  - Khinite-3T* (syn. parakhinite, 1978-036, IMA 2008-C)
  - Khinite-4O (syn. khinite, strict sense; 1978-035, IMA 2008-C Rd)
- Lamprophyllite 9.BE.25
  - Polytypes: -2M , -2O
- Moissanite 01.DA.-- ("carborundum (synthetic)")
  (IUPAC: silicon carbide)
  - A large number of polytypes are known, the majority of moissanite samples are 6H and 15R polytypes.
- Natroalunite (Y: 1902) 7.BC.10
  (IUPAC: Sodium trialuminium disulfate hexahydroxyl)
  - Natroalunite-2c (IMA1980-095) 7.BC.10
- Nechelyustovite 9.BE.55
  - Polytypes: -1M and -2M.
- Pearceite-Tac - Polybasite Series
  - Pearceite-Tac 2.GB.15
  - Polybasite 2.GB.15
    - Polybasite-Tac
    - Pearceite-T2ac
    - Pearceite-M2a2b2c
    - Polybasite-T2ac
    - Polybasite-M2a2b2c
    - Nomenclature change: antimonpearceite was replaced by polybasite-Tac, arsenpolybasite-221 by pearceite-T2ac, arsenpolybasite-222 by pearceite-M2a2b2c, polybasite-221 by polybasite-T2ac, and polybasite-222 by polybasite-M2a2b2c.
- Plombièrite 9.DG.08
  - Polytypes: -4O and -2M .
- Quintinite (IMA1992-028, IMA1998 s.p.) 5.DA.40 [none]
  - Quintinite-2H
  - Quintinite-3T* (1992-029, 1998 s.p.)
- Veatchite 6.EC.15
  - Veatchite-A (IMA1978-030)
  - Veatchite-1M (Y: 1959, veatchite-p)
  - Veatchite-2M (Y: 1938)
- Wagnerite (Y: 1821)
  - Polytypes: -Ma2bc, -Ma3bc, -Ma5bc, -Ma7bc, -Ma9bc
- Wollastonite 9.DG.05
  - Polytypes: -1A , -2M , -3A , -4A , -5A , -7A
- Wurtzite 2.CB.45
  - Polytypes: -10H, -15R, -4H, -6H, -8H
- Xonotlite 9.DG.35
  - Polytypes: -Ma2bc, -Ma2b2c, -M2a2bc
- Zaccagnaite 5.DA.45
  - Polytypes: -2H, -3R
- Zincowoodwardite 7.DD.35
  - Polytypes: -1T, -3R
- Zirconolite 4.DH.30
  - Polytypes: -2M , -3O , -3T

== Hydrous diuranyl di(RO_{4}) family ==
=== Meta-autunite group ===
- Meta-autunite, 8.EB.10, tetragonal
- Uramarsite, 8.EB.15, tetragonal

=== Natroautunite group ===
- Abernathyite, 8.EB.15, tetragonal
- Chernikovite, 8.EB.15, tetragonal
- Meta-ankoleite, 8.EB.15, tetragonal
- Natrouranospinite, 8.EB.15, tetragonal
- Trögerite, 8.EB.15, tetragonal
- Uramphite, 8.EB.15, tetragonal

=== Carnotite family (partial) ===
- Carnotite, 4.HB.05, monoclinic
- Margaritasite, 4.HB.05, monoclinic
- Metavanuralite, 4.HB.20, triclinic
- Sengierite, 4.HB.10, monoclinic
- Strelkinite, 4.HB.30, orthorhombic
- Tyuyamunite, 4.HB.25, orthorhombic
- Vanuralite, 4.HB.20, monoclinic

=== Other hydrous families ===
- Przhevalskite (4H_{2}O), 8.EB.10, orthorhombic
- Metauramphite (6H_{2}O), questionable mineral
- Metauranocircite-I (6H_{2}O), 8.EB.10, monoclinic
- Lehnerite (8H_{2}O), 8.EB.05, tetragonal
- Metaheinrichite (8H_{2}O), 8.EB.10, tetragonal
- Metakahlerite (8H_{2}O), 8.EB.10, triclinic
- Metakirchheimerite (8H_{2}O), 8.EB.10, triclinic
- Metanováčekite (8H_{2}O), 8.EB.10, tetragonal
- Metarauchite (8H_{2}O), 8.EB.05, triclinic
- Metasaléeite (8H_{2}O), 8.EB.10, tetragonal
- Metatorbernite (8H_{2}O), 8.EB.10, tetragonal
- Metauranospinite (8H_{2}O), 8.EB.10, tetragonal
- Metazeunerite (8H_{2}O), 8.EB.10, tetragonal
- Threadgoldite (8H_{2}O), 8.EB.20, monoclinic
- Autunite (10-12H_{2}O), 8.EB.05, orthorhombic
- Bassetite ((H_{2}O)_{10}), 8.EB.10, monoclinic
- Heinrichite (10H_{2}O), 8.EB.05, monoclinic
- Metalodèvite (10H_{2}O), 8.EB.10, tetragonal
- Nováčekite-II (10H_{2}O), n.d., monoclinic
- Rauchite (10H_{2}O), 8.EB.05, triclinic
- Saléeite ((H_{2}O)_{10}), 8.EB.05, monoclinic
- Uranocircite-II (10H_{2}O), n.d., tetragonal
- Uranospinite (10H_{2}O), 8.EB.05, tetragonal
- Kahlerite (12H_{2}O), 8.EB.10, monoclinic
- Nováčekite-I (12H_{2}O), 8.EB.05, triclinic
- Torbernite (12H_{2}O), 8.EB.05, tetragonal
- Zeunerite (12H_{2}O), 8.EB.05, tetragonal

== Hydrotalcite supergroup ==
The hydrotalcite supergroup might need another review.

=== Hydrotalcite group ===
- Desautelsite^{A} (1978-016), chemical formula
  Suggested: Mg_{6}Mn^{3+}_{2}(OH)_{16}[CO_{3}]·4H_{2}O
- Droninoite^{A} (2008-003), chemical formula
  Suggested: Ni_{6}Fe^{3+}_{2}(OH)_{16}Cl_{2}·4H_{2}O
- Hydrotalcite^{G} (Y: 1842), chemical formula
  Suggested: Mg_{6}Al_{2}(OH)_{16}[CO_{3}]·4H_{2}O
- Iowaite^{A} (1967-002), chemical formula
  Suggested: Mg_{6}Fe^{3+}_{2}(OH)_{16}Cl_{2}·4H_{2}O
- Jamborite^{Q} (1971-037), chemical formula
  Suggested: possibly Ni^{2+}_{6}Ni^{3+}_{2}(OH)_{16}S·4H_{2}O
- Meixnerite^{A} (1974-003), chemical formula
  Suggested: Mg_{6}Al_{2}(OH)_{16}(OH)_{2}·4H_{2}O
- Pyroaurite^{Rd} (Y: 1865), chemical formula
  Suggested: Mg_{6}Fe^{3+}_{2}(OH)_{16}[CO_{3}]·4H_{2}O
- Reevesite^{A} (1966-025), chemical formula
  Suggested: Ni_{6}Fe^{3+}_{2}(OH)_{16}[CO_{3}]·4H_{2}O
- Stichtite^{Rd} (Y: 1910), chemical formula
  Suggested: Mg_{6}Cr_{2}(OH)_{16}[CO_{3}]·4H_{2}O
- Takovite^{A} (Y: 1957, 1977 s.p.), chemical formula
  Suggested: Ni_{6}Al_{2}(OH)_{16}[CO_{3}]·4H_{2}O
- Woodallite^{A} (2000-042), chemical formula
  Suggested: Mg_{6}Cr_{2}(OH)_{16}Cl_{2}·4H_{2}O

=== Quintinite group ===
- Caresite^{A} (1992-030), chemical formula
  Suggested: Fe^{3+}_{4}Al_{2}(OH)_{12}[CO_{3}]·3H_{2}O
- Charmarite^{A} (1992-026), chemical formula
  Suggested: Mn_{4}Al_{2}(OH)_{12}[CO_{3}]·3H_{2}O
- Chlormagaluminite^{A} (1980-098), chemical formula
  Suggested: Mg_{4}Al_{2}(OH)_{12}Cl_{2}·2H_{2}O
- Comblainite^{A} (1978-009), chemical formula
  Suggested: Ni_{4}Co^{3+}_{2}(OH)_{12}[CO_{3}]·3H_{2}O
- Quintinite^{A} (1992-028), chemical formula
  Suggested: Mg_{4}Al_{2}(OH)_{12}[CO_{3}]·3H_{2}O
- Zaccagnaite^{A} (1997-019), chemical formula
  Suggested: Zn_{4}Al_{2}(OH)_{12}[CO_{3}]·3H_{2}O

=== Fougèrite group ===
- Fougèrite^{Rd} (2003-057), chemical formula
  Suggested: Fe^{2+}_{4}Fe^{3+}_{2}(OH)_{12}[CO_{3}]·3H_{2}O
- Mössbauerite^{A} (2012-049), chemical formula
  Suggested: Fe^{3+}_{6}O_{4}(OH)_{8}[CO_{3}]·3H_{2}O
- Trébeurdenite^{A} (2012 s.p.), chemical formula
  Suggested: Fe^{2+}_{2}Fe^{3+}_{4}O_{2}(OH)_{10}[CO_{3}]·3H_{2}O

=== Woodwardite group ===
- Honessite^{A} (1962 s.p.), chemical formula
  Suggested: $\ce{(Ni_{1\!-\mathit{x}} Fe_{3\!+\mathit{x}} )(SO4)_{\mathit{x}/2}(OH)2.\mathit{n}H2O}$ ${\scriptstyle \left(x < \frac 1 2, n < \frac 3 2 x \right)}$
- Woodwardite^{G} (Y: 1866), chemical formula
  Suggested: $\ce{(Cu_{1\!-\mathit{x}}Al_\mathit{x} )(SO4)_{\mathit{x}/2}(OH)2.\mathit{n}H2O}$ ${\scriptstyle \left(x < \frac 1 2, n > \frac 3 2 x \right)}$
- Zincowoodwardite^{A} (1998-026), chemical formula
  Suggested: $\ce{(Zn_{1\!-\mathit{x}}Al_\mathit{x} )(SO4)_{\mathit{x}/2}(OH)2.\mathit{n}H2O}$ ${\scriptstyle \left(x < \frac 1 2, n < \frac 3 2 x \right)}$

=== Cualstibite group ===
- Cualstibite^{Rd} (1983-068), chemical formula
  Suggested: Cu_{2}Al(OH)_{6}[Sb(OH)_{6}]
- Omsite^{A} (2012-025), chemical formula
  Suggested: Ni_{2}Fe^{3+}(OH)_{6}[Sb(OH)_{6}]
- Zincalstibite^{A} (1998-033), chemical formula
  Suggested: Zn_{2}Al(OH)_{6}[Sb(OH)_{6}]

=== Glaucocerinite group ===
- Carrboydite^{Q} (1974-033), chemical formula
  Suggested: $\ce{(Ni_{1\!-\mathit{x}}Al_\mathit{x} )(SO4)_{\mathit{x}/2}(OH)2.\mathit{n}H2O}$ ${\scriptstyle \left(x < \frac 1 2, n > \frac 3 2 x \right)}$
- Glaucocerinite^{G} (Y: 1932), chemical formula
  Suggested: $\ce{(Zn_{1\!-\mathit{x}}Al_\mathit{x} )(SO4)_{\mathit{x}/2}(OH)2.\mathit{n}H2O}$ ${\scriptstyle \left(x < \frac 1 2, n > \frac 3 2 x \right)}$
- Hydrohonessite^{A} (1980-037a), chemical formula
  Suggested: $\ce{(Ni_{1\!-\mathit{x}} Fe_{3\!+\mathit{x}} )(SO4)_{\mathit{x}/2}(OH)2.\mathit{n}H2O}$ ${\scriptstyle \left(x < \frac 1 2, n > \frac 3 2 x \right)}$
- Hydrowoodwardite^{A} (1996-038), chemical formula
  Suggested: $\ce{(Cu_{1\!-\mathit{x}}Al_\mathit{x} )(SO4)_{\mathit{x}/2}(OH)2.\mathit{n}H2O}$ ${\scriptstyle \left(x < \frac 1 2, n > \frac 3 2 x \right)}$
- Mountkeithite^{A} (1980-038), chemical formula
  Suggested: $\ce{(Mg_{1\!-\mathit{x}} Fe_{3\!+\mathit{x}} )(SO4)_{\mathit{x}/2}(OH)2.\mathit{n}H2O}$ ${\scriptstyle \left(x < \frac 1 2, n > \frac 3 2 x \right)}$
- Zincaluminite^{Q} (Y: 1881), chemical formula
  Suggested: $\ce{(Zn_{1\!-\mathit{x}}Al_\mathit{x} )(SO4)_{\mathit{x}/2}(OH)2.\mathit{n}H2O}$ ${\scriptstyle \left(x < \frac 1 2, n > \frac 3 2 x \right)}$

=== Wermlandite group ===
- Karchevskyite^{A} (2005-015a), chemical formula
  Suggested: Mg_{18}Al_{9}(OH)_{54}Sr_{2}(CO_{3})_{9}(H_{2}O)_{6}(H_{3}O)_{5}
- Motukoreaite^{Q} (1976-033), chemical formula
  Suggested: Mg_{6}Al_{3}(OH)_{18}[Na(H_{2}O)_{6}](SO_{4})_{2}·6H_{2}O, possibly more than one species
- Natroglaucocerinite^{Q} (1995-025), chemical formula
  Suggested: possibly Zn_{6}Al_{3}(OH)_{18}[Na(H_{2}O)_{6}](SO_{4})_{2}·6H_{2}O
- Nikischerite^{A} (2001-039), chemical formula
  Suggested: Fe^{2+}_{6}Al_{3}(OH)_{18}[Na(H_{2}O)_{6}](SO_{4})_{2}·6H_{2}O
- Shigaite^{A} (1984-057), chemical formula
  Suggested: Mn_{6}Al_{3}(OH)_{18}[Na(H_{2}O)_{6}](SO_{4})_{2}·6H_{2}O
- Wermlandite^{A} (1970-007), chemical formula
  Suggested: Mg_{7}Al_{2}(OH)_{18}[Ca(H_{2}O)_{6}](SO_{4})_{2}·6H_{2}O

=== Hydrocalumite group ===
- Hydrocalumite^{G} (Y: 1934), chemical formula
  Suggested: Ca_{4}Al_{2}(OH)_{12}(Cl,CO_{3},OH)_{2}·4H_{2}O, possibly multiple species
- Kuzelite^{A} (1996-053), chemical formula
  Suggested: Ca_{4}Al_{2}(OH)_{12}(SO_{4})·6H_{2}O

== See also ==
- List of minerals recognized by the International Mineralogical Association
