= Carbonate nitrate =

Class of chemical compounds

Carbonate nitrates are mixed anion compounds containing both carbonate and nitrate ions.

Hydrotalcite can contain carbonate and nitrate ions between its layers. Magnesium can be substituted by nickel, cobalt or copper.

Oxycarbonitrates containing an alkaline earth metal and cuprate and nitrate and carbonate anions in layers, form a family of superconducting materials.

== List ==
name	formula	ratio	formula weight	crystal system	space group	unit cell Å	volume	density	comment	ref
	Na_{3}K_{6}(CO_{3})_{3}(NO_{3})_{3}·6H_{2}O	1:1	732.69	orthorhombic	Cmcm	a=16.414 b=9.271 c=15.884 Z=4	2417.0	2.137		
	Na_{3}K_{6}(CO_{3})_{3}(NO_{3})_{2}Cl·6H_{2}O	3:2	751.17	hexagonal	P6_{3}/mcm	a=9.3695 c=15.6636 Z=2	1190.84	2.095		
	Na_{3}K_{6}(CO_{3})_{3}(NO_{3})_{2}Br·6H_{2}O	3:2	795.63	hexagonal	P6_{3}/mcm	a=9.3496 c =15.7968 Z=2	1195.87	2.210		
Tetraammine(carbonato-κ^{2}O,O′)cobalt(III) nitrate	(Co(NH_{3})_{5}(CO_{3}))(NO_{3})·H_{2}O	1:1		monoclinic	P2_{1}/c	a = 7.8520 b = 6.7922 c = 17.5394 β = 95.440° Z = 4	931.2			
	(Co(NH_{3})_{4}CO_{3})(NO_{3})·(H_{2}O)_{0.5}	1:1		monoclinic	P2_{1}/n	a=7.4319 b=22.647 c=10.4103 β=92.052° Z=8	1756	1.95	violet-red; loses water at 125 °C	
	(Co(NH_{3})_{4}(CO_{3})(NO_{3}))_{2}·H_{2}O	1:1		monoclinic	P2_{1}/n	a=7.4960 b=22.673 c=10.513 β=91.41° Z=4	1786.12	1.915		
	[Co(NH_{3})_{5}CO_{3}]NO_{3}·1/2H_{2}O	1:1		monoclinic	P2_{1}/m	a=7.6661 b=9.6212 c=7.0725 β=106.261° Z=2	500.78	1.82	pink	
	[Co(NH_{3})_{5}CO_{3}]NO_{3}·H_{2}O	1:1		monoclinic	P2_{1}	a = 7.6733 b = 9.6398 c = 7.0852 β = 106.195°		1.87	pink	
Tetraammine(carbonato-κ^{2}O,O′)cobalt(III) nitrate	(Co(CO_{3})(NH_{3})_{4})(NO_{3})	1:1		monoclinic	P2_{1}/c	a = 7.8520 b = 6.7922 c = 17.5394 β = 95.440° Z = 4	931.2		pink	
	[(NH_{3})_{3}Co(μ-OH)_{2}(μ-CO_{3})Co(NH_{3})_{3}][NO_{3}]_{2}·H_{2}O	1:2		triclinic	P1̅	a=7.7038 b=9.672 c=10.861 α=104.826° β=109.405° γ=91.553°				
cis-(Carbonato-O,O')-bis(2,2'-bipyridine)-cobalt(iii) nitrate pentahydrate	[Co(C_{10}H_{8}N_{2})_{2}(CO_{3})]NO_{3}·5H_{2}O			monoclinic	C2/c	a=10.931 b=16.039 c=14.435β=101.94° Z=4	2476			
	Na_{3}Rb_{6}(CO_{3})_{3}(NO_{3})_{2}Cl·(H_{2}O)_{6}	3:2	1029.39	hexagonal	P6_{3}/mcm	a = 9.5732 c = 15.820 Z=2	1255.6	2.723	UV cut off 231 nm; (-) uniaxial; birefringence 0.14 @ 546 nm	
	Na_{3}Rb_{6}(CO_{3})_{3}(NO_{3})_{2}Br·6H_{2}O	3:2		hexagonal	P6_{3}/mcm	a=9.6086 c=15.864 Z=2				
	N_{0.2}C_{0.8}Sr_{3}Cu_{2}O_{7.0}									
	C_{0.8}N_{0.2}Sr_{2}CuO_{5.3}									
	N_{0.5}C_{0.5}Sr_{3}Cu_{2}O_{7.4}								Tc=33	
	N_{0.5}C_{0.5}Sr_{2}CaCu_{2}O_{7.45}								Tc=91	
	N_{0.5}C_{0.5}Sr_{2.7}Ca_{1.3}Cu3O_{9.5}								Tc=91	
	N_{0.5}C_{0.5}Sr_{2.7}Ca_{1.3}Cu_{3}O_{9.8}								Tc=101	
	N_{0.5}C_{0.5}Sr_{2.7}Ca_{1.3}Cu_{3}O_{9.85}								Tc=101	
	N_{0.5}C_{0.5}Sr_{2}Ca_{2}Cu_{3}O_{10.0}									
	N_{0.5}C_{0.5}Sr_{2}Ca_{3}Cu_{4}O_{10.0}									
	N_{0.5}C_{0.5}Sr_{2}Ca_{3}Cu_{4}O_{11.8}								Tc=99K	
	N_{0.5}C_{0.5}Sr_{2}Ca_{3}Cu_{4}O_{11.9}								Tc=101K	
	N_{0.5}C_{0.5}Sr_{3.4}Ca_{1.6}Cu_{4}O_{12.0}								Tc=105K	
	Na_{3}KRbK_{6}(CO_{3})_{3}(NO_{3})_{2}Cl·6H_{2}O	3:2								
	Na_{3}RbK_{6}(CO_{3})_{3}(NO_{3})_{2}Br·6H_{2}O	3:2								
	YCaBa_{4}Cu_{5}(NO_{3})_{0.3}(CO_{3})_{0.7}O_{11}								superconductor Tc=82k	
hexakis(μ_{4}-(R)-N^{2}-(2-Oxybenzyl)asparaginato)-(μ_{3}-carbonato-O,O,O',O',O'',O'')-diaqua-pentakis(methanol)-methoxy-hexakis(nitrato-O,O')-hepta-lanthanum(iii) methanol solvate tetrahydrate				monoclinic	P2_{1}	a=15.6719 b=25.570 c=16.472 β=101.838°			colourless	
hexakis(μ_{4}-(S)-N^{2}-(2-Oxybenzyl)asparaginato)-(μ_{3}-carbonato-O,O,O',O',O'',O'')-heptakis(methanol)-methoxy-hexakis(nitrato-O,O')-hepta-lanthanum(iii) methanol solvate pentahydrate				monoclinic	P2_{1}	a=15.662 b=25.624 c=16.460 β=101.924°				
pentakis(μ_{3}-Glycine hydroxamato)-tetraaqua-(nitrato-O)-(nitrato-O,O')-penta-copper(ii)-europium(iii) tetrahydrate	[EuCu_{5}(GlyHA)_{5}(CO_{3})(NO_{3})(H_{2}O)_{5}]·3.5H_{2}O			triclinic	P1̅	a=11.163 b=11.524 c=13.323 α=93.85° β=94.79° γ=107.14° Z=2	1624	2.425		
pentakis(μ-2-amino-N-oxidoethanimidato)-(carbonato)-nitrato-penta-aqua-penta-copper(ii)-gadolinium(iii) hydrate	[GdCu_{5}(GlyHA)_{5}(CO_{3})(NO_{3})(H_{2}O)_{5}]·3.5H_{2}O			triclinic	P1̅	a=11.206 b=11.505 c=13.298 α=94.026° β=94.942° γ=107.558° Z=2	1620.2	2.440	dark blue	
pentakis(μ-2-amino-N-oxidoethanimidato)-(carbonato)-nitrato-penta-aqua-penta-copper(ii)-dysprosium(iii) hydrate	[DyCu_{5}(GlyHA)_{5}(CO_{3})(NO_{3})(H_{2}O)_{5}]·3.28H_{2}O			triclinic	P1̅	a=11.1083 b=11.4991 c=13.2894 α=93.923° β=94.771° γ=107.147° Z=2	1608.7	2.460	dark blue	
	[HoCu_{5}(GlyHA)_{5}(CO_{3})(NO_{3})(H_{2}O)_{5}]·3.445H_{2}O			triclinic	P1̅	a=11.2027 b=11.4955 c=13.247 α=94.001° β=94.784° γ=107.518° Z=2	1613.0	2.467	dark blue	
bis(μ4-carbonato-O,O,O',O')-tetrakis(diammineplatinum(II)) tetranitrate trihydrate	((Pt(NH_{3})_{2})_{4}(CO_{3})_{2})(NO_{3})_{4}·(H_{2}O)_{3}	2:4		triclinic	P1̅	a=11.324 b=12.151 c=10.926 α=103.792° β=111.266° γ=75.845°			blue	
	(Tl_{5/6}Cr_{1/6})Sr_{4}Cu_{2}(CO_{3})_{1/2}(NO_{3})_{1/2}O_{7}			tetragonal		a = 3.8320 c = 16.4112				
	[Pb_{6}O_{4}](OH)(NO_{3})(CO_{3})	1:1		orthorhombic	Pnma	a=30.557 b=5.809 c=7.183 Z=4	1274.9			
