= Dike (geology) =

Sheet of rock that is formed in a fracture of a pre-existing rock body

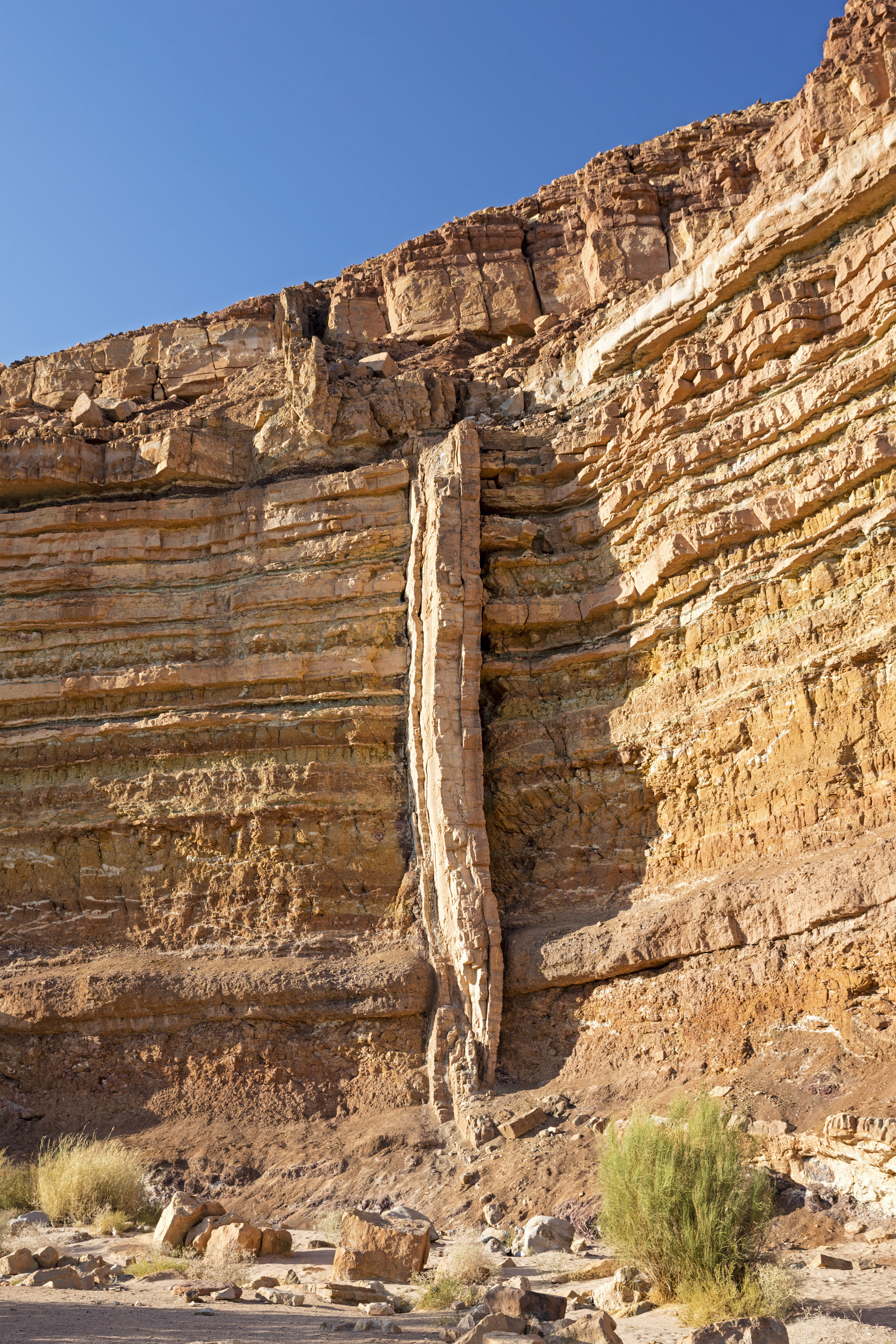
A magmatic dike (vertical) cross-cutting horizontal layers of sedimentary rock, in Makhtesh Ramon, Israel

In geology, a dike or dyke is a sheet of rock that is formed in a fracture of a pre-existing rock body. Dikes can be either magmatic or sedimentary in origin. Magmatic dikes form when magma flows into a crack then solidifies as a sheet intrusion, either cutting across layers of rock or through a contiguous mass of rock. Clastic dikes are formed when sediment fills a pre-existing crack.

== Magmatic dike ==
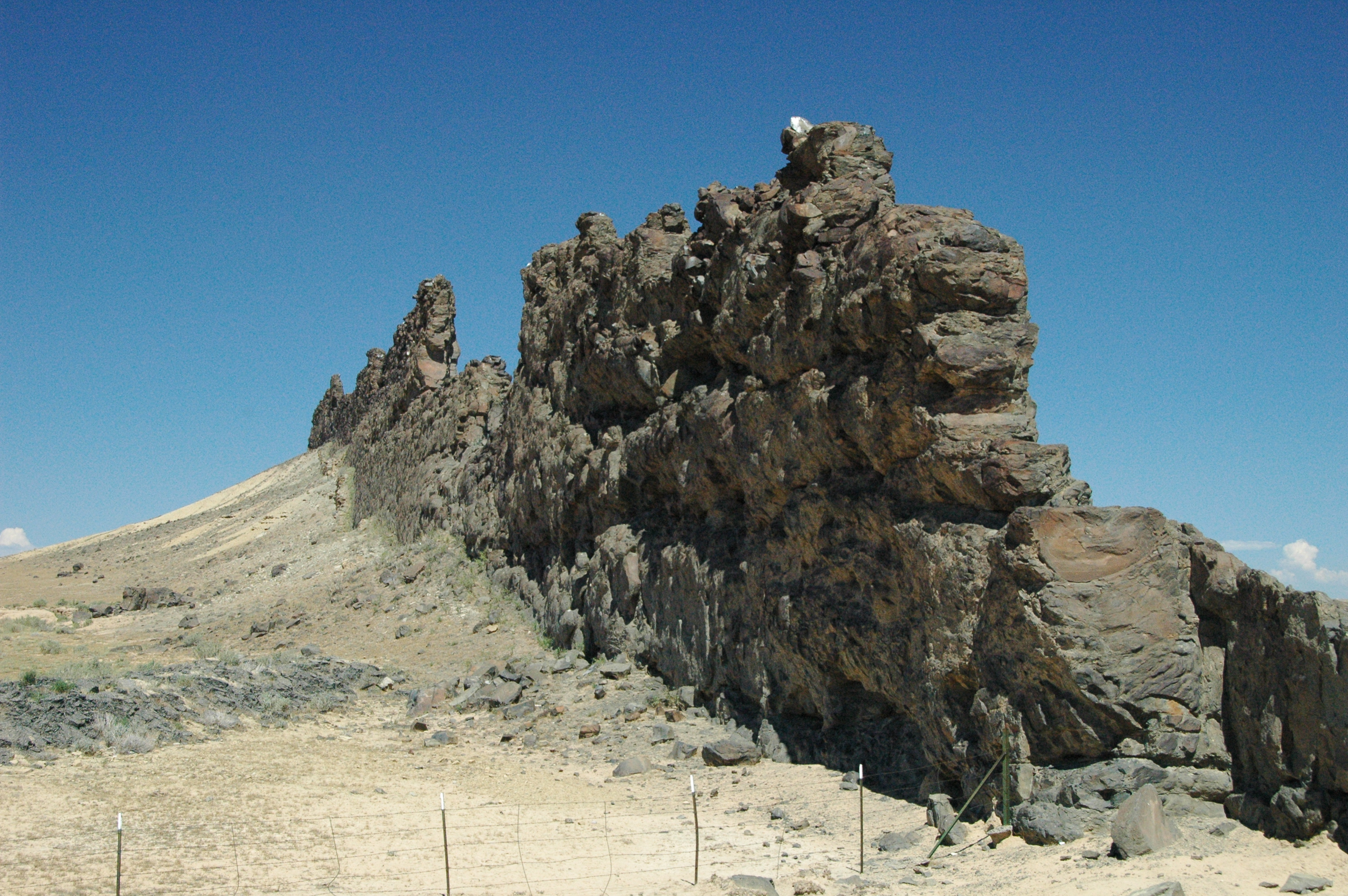
A dike of lamprophyre near the Shiprock volcanic plug, New Mexico, that has resisted the erosion that removed some of the softer rock into which the dike was originally intruded

A magmatic dike is a sheet of igneous rock that cuts across older rock beds. It is formed when magma fills a fracture in the older beds and then cools and solidifies. The dike rock is usually more resistant to weathering than the surrounding rock, so that erosion exposes the dike as a natural wall or ridge. It is from these natural walls that dikes get their name.

Dikes preserve a record of the fissures through which most mafic magma (fluid magma low in silica) reaches the surface. They are studied by geologists for the clues they provide on volcanic plumbing systems. They also record ancient episodes of extension of the Earth's crust, since large numbers of dikes (dike swarms) are formed when the crust is pulled apart by tectonic forces. The dikes show the direction of extension, since they form at right angles to the direction of maximum extension.

=== Description ===
The thickness of a dike is much smaller than its other two dimensions, and the opposite walls are roughly parallel, so that a dike is more or less constant in thickness. The thickness of different dikes can range from a few millimeters to hundreds of meters, but is most typically from about a meter to a few tens of meters. The lateral extent can be tens of kilometers, and dikes with a thickness of a few tens of meters or more commonly extend for over 100 km. Most dikes are steeply dipping; in other words, they are oriented nearly vertically. Subsequent tectonic deformation may rotate the sequence of strata through which the dike propagates so that the dike becomes horizontal.

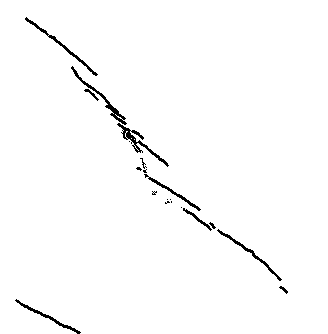
Simplified map of the en echelon dike set at Jagged Rock, Arizona, US. The total dike length is about 1.45 km.

It is common for a set of dikes, each a few kilometers long, to form en echelon. This pattern is seen in the Higganum dike set of New England. This dike set consists of individual dikes that are typically four kilometers in length at the surface and up to 60 meters wide. These short segments form longer groups extending for around 10 km. The entire set of dikes forms a line extending for 250 km. Individual segments overlap, with the overlapping portions thinner, so that the combined thickness of the two overlapped portions is about the same as the thickness of a single segment. Other examples of en echelon dikes are the Inyo dike of Long Valley, California, US; the Jagged Rocks complex, Arizona, US; and the dikes of oceanic spreading centers.

Dikes range in composition from basaltic to rhyolitic, but most are basaltic. The texture is typically slightly coarser than basalt erupted at the surface, forming a rock type called diabase. The grain size varies systematically across the dike, with the coarsest grains normally at the center of the dike. Dikes formed at shallow depth commonly have a glassy or fine-grained chilled margin 1 to 5 cm thick, formed where the magma was rapidly cooled by contact with the cold surrounding rock. Shallow dikes also typically show columnar jointing perpendicular to the margins. Here the dike rock fractures into columns as it cools and contracts. These are usually 5- to 6-sided, but 3- to 4-sided columns are also common. These are fairly uniform in size within a single dike, but range from a few centimeters to over 0.3 meters across in different dikes, tending to be thicker in wider dikes. Larger columns are likely a consequence of slower cooling.

Dike rock is usually dense, with almost no vesicles (frozen bubbles), but vesicles may be seen in the shallowest part of a dike. When vesicles are present, they tend to form bands parallel to walls and are elongated in direction of flow. Likewise, phenocrysts (larger crystals) on the margins of the dike show an alignment in the direction of flow.

In contrast to dikes, which cut across the bedding of layered rock, a sill is a sheet intrusion that forms within and parallel to the bedding.

=== Formation ===
Mafic magma (fluid magma low in silica) usually reaches the surface through fissures, forming dikes.

At the shallowest depths, dikes form when magma rises into an existing fissure. In the young, shallow dikes of the Hawaiian Islands, there is no indication of forceful intrusion of magma. For example, there is little penetration of magma into the walls of dikes even when the walls consist of highly porous volcanic clinker, and little wall material breaks off into the molten magma. These fissures likely open as a result of bulging of the rock beds above a magma chamber that is being filled with magma from deeper in the crust.

However, open fractures can exist only near the surface. Magma deeper in the crust must force its way through the rock, always opening a path along a plane normal to the minimum principal stress. This is the direction in which the crust is under the weakest compression and so requires the least work to fracture. At shallow depths, where the rock is brittle, the pressurized magma progressively fractures the rock as it advances upwards. Even if the magma is only slightly pressurized compared with the surrounding rock, tremendous stress is concentrated on the tip of the propagating fracture. In effect, the magma wedges apart the brittle rock in a process called hydraulic fracture. At greater depths, where the rock is hotter and less brittle, the magma forces the rock aside along brittle shear planes oriented 35 degrees to the sides of the dock. This bulldozer-like action produces a blunter dike tip. At the greatest depths, the shear planes become ductile faults, angled 45 degree from the sides of the dike. At depths where the rock is completely plastic, a diapir (a rising plug of magma) forms instead of a dike.

The walls of dikes often fit closely back together, providing strong evidence that the dike formed by dilatation of a fissure. However, a few large dikes, such as the 120-meter-thick Medford dike in Maine, US, or the 500-meter-thick Gardar dike in Greenland, show no dilatation. These may have formed by stoping, in which the magma fractured and disintegrated the rock at its advancing tip rather than prying the rock apart. Other dikes may have formed by metasomatism, in which fluids moving along a narrow fissure changed the chemical composition of the rock closest to the fissure.

There is an approximate relationship between the width of a dike and its maximum extent, expressed by the formula:

$\frac{2w}{2b}=\frac{2.25P_{ex}}{\rho_{host}V_P^2}$

Here $w$ is the thickness of the dike; $b$ is its lateral extent; $P_{ex}$ is the excess pressure in the magma relative to the host rock; $\rho_{host}$ is the density of the host rock; and $V_P$ is the P-wave velocity of the host rock (essentially, the speed of sound in the rock). This formula predicts that dikes will be longer and narrower at greater depths below the surface. The ratio of thickness to length is around 0.01 to 0.001 near the surface, but at depth it ranges from 0.001 to 0.0001. A surface dike 10 meters in thickness will extend about 3 km, while a dike of similar thickness at depth will extend about 30 km. This tendency of intruding magma to form shorter fissures at shallower depths has been put forward as an explanation of en echelon dikes. However, en echelon dikes have also been explained as a consequence of the direction of minimum principal stress changing as the magma ascends from deep to shallow levels in the crust.

An en echelon dike set may evolve into single dike with bridges connecting the formerly separate segments and horns showing former segment overlaps. In ancient dikes in deformed rock, the bridges and horns are used by geologists to determine the direction of magma flow.

Where there is rapid flow of molten magma through a fissure, the magma tends to erode the walls, either by melting the wall rock or by tearing off fragments of wall rock. This widens the fissure and increases flow. Where flow is less rapid, the magma may solidify next to the wall, narrowing the fissure and decreasing flow. This causes flow to become concentrated at a few points. At Hawaii, eruptions often begin with a curtain of fire where lava erupts along the entire length of a fissure several kilometers long. However, the length of erupting fissure diminishes over time, becoming focused on a short segment of less than half a kilometer. The minimum possible width of a dike is determined by the balance between magma movement and cooling.

=== Multiple and composite dikes ===
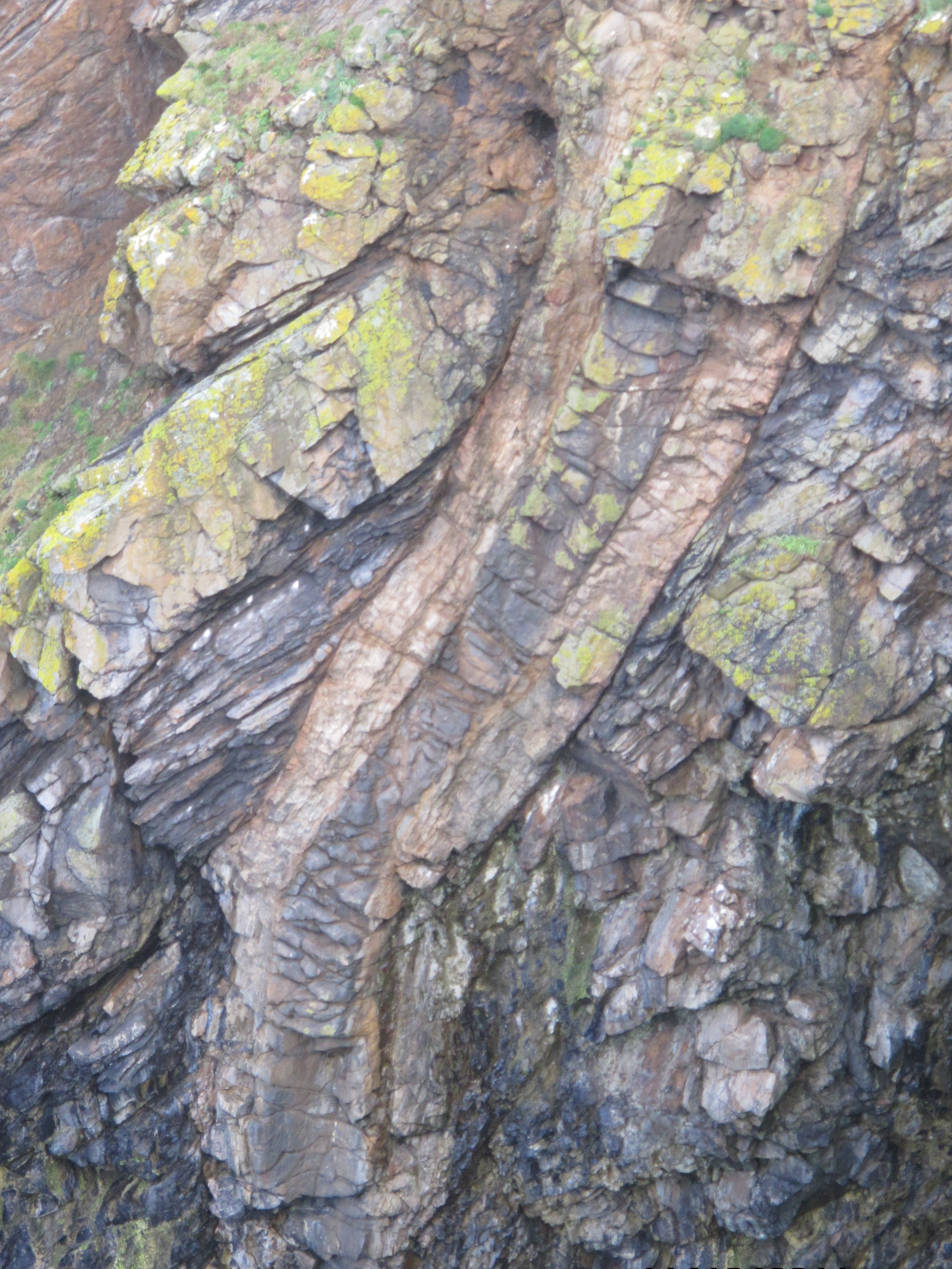
A composite dike in Orkney, Scotland, with bostonite margins and a camptonite center

There may be more than one injection of magma along a given fissure. When multiple injections are all of similar composition, the dike is described as a multiple dike. However, subsequent injections are sometimes quite different in composition, and then the dike is described as a composite dike. The range of compositions in a composite dike can go all the way from diabase to granite, as is observed in some dikes of Scotland and northern Ireland.

After the initial formation of a dike, subsequent injections of magma are most likely to take place along the center of the dike. If the previous dike rock has cooled significantly, the subsequent injection can be characterized by fracturing of the old dike rock and the formation of chilled margins on the new injection.

=== Dike swarms ===
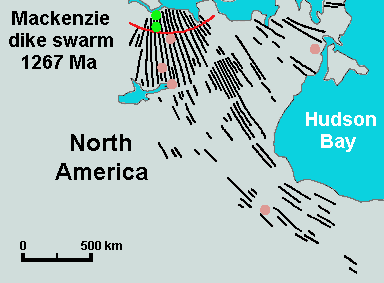
Mackenzie dike swarm

Sometimes dikes appear in swarms, consisting of several to hundreds of dikes emplaced more or less contemporaneously during a single intrusive event. Dike swarms are almost always composed of diabase and most often are associated with flood basalts of large igneous provinces. They are characteristic of divergent plate boundaries. For example, Jurassic dike swarms in New England and Paleogene swarms in the west of Scotland and running into northern England record the early opening of the Atlantic Ocean. Dike swarms are forming in the present day along the divergent plate boundary running through Iceland. Dike swarms often have a great cumulative thickness: Dikes in Iceland average 3 to 5 meters in width, but one 53-kilometer stretch of coast has about 1000 dikes with total thickness of 3 kilometers. The world's largest dike swarm is the Mackenzie dike swarm in the Northwest Territories, Canada.

Dike swarms (also called dike complexes) are exposed in the eroded rift zones of Hawaiian volcanoes. As with most other magmatic dikes, these were fissures through which lava reached the surface. The swarms are typically 2.5 to 5 km in width, with individual dikes about a meter in width. The dike swarms extend radially out from volcano summits and parallel to the long axis of the volcanic shield. Sills and stocks are occasionally present in the complexes. They are abruptly truncated at the margins of summit calderas. Typically, there are about 50 to 100 dikes per kilometer at the center of the rift zone, though the density can be as high as 500 per kilometer and the dikes then make up half the volume of the rock. The density drops to 5 to 50 per kilometer away from the center of the rift zone before abruptly dropping to very few dikes. It is likely that the number of dikes must increase with depth, reaching a typical value of 300 to 350 per kilometer at the level of the ocean floor. In some respects, these dike swarms resemble those of western Scotland associated with the flood eruptions that preceded the opening of the Atlantic Ocean.

Dikes often form as radial swarms from a central volcano or intrusion. Though they appear to originate in the central intrusion, the dikes often have a different age and composition from the intrusion. These radial swarms may have formed over the intrusion and were later cut by the rising body of magma, or the crust was already experiencing regional tension and the intrusion triggered formation of the fissures.

=== Sheeted dike complexes ===
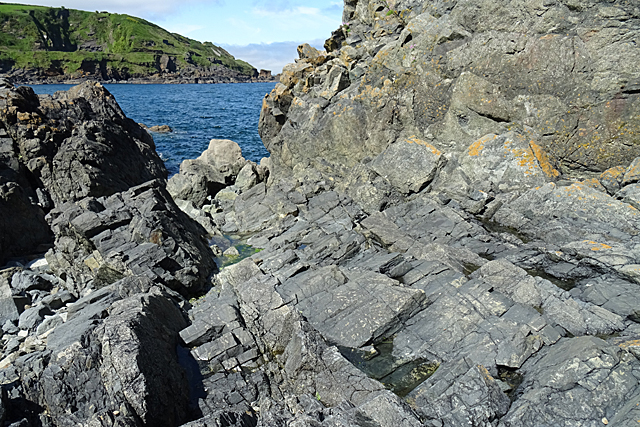
Sheeted dikes of the Lizard complex, Cornwall, England

In rock of the oceanic crust, pillow lava erupted onto the sea floor is underlain by sheeted dike complexes that preserve the conduits through which magma reached the ocean floor at mid-ocean ridges. These sheeted dikes characteristically show a chilled margin on only one side, indicating that each dike was split in half by a subsequent eruption of magma.

=== Ring dikes and cone sheets ===
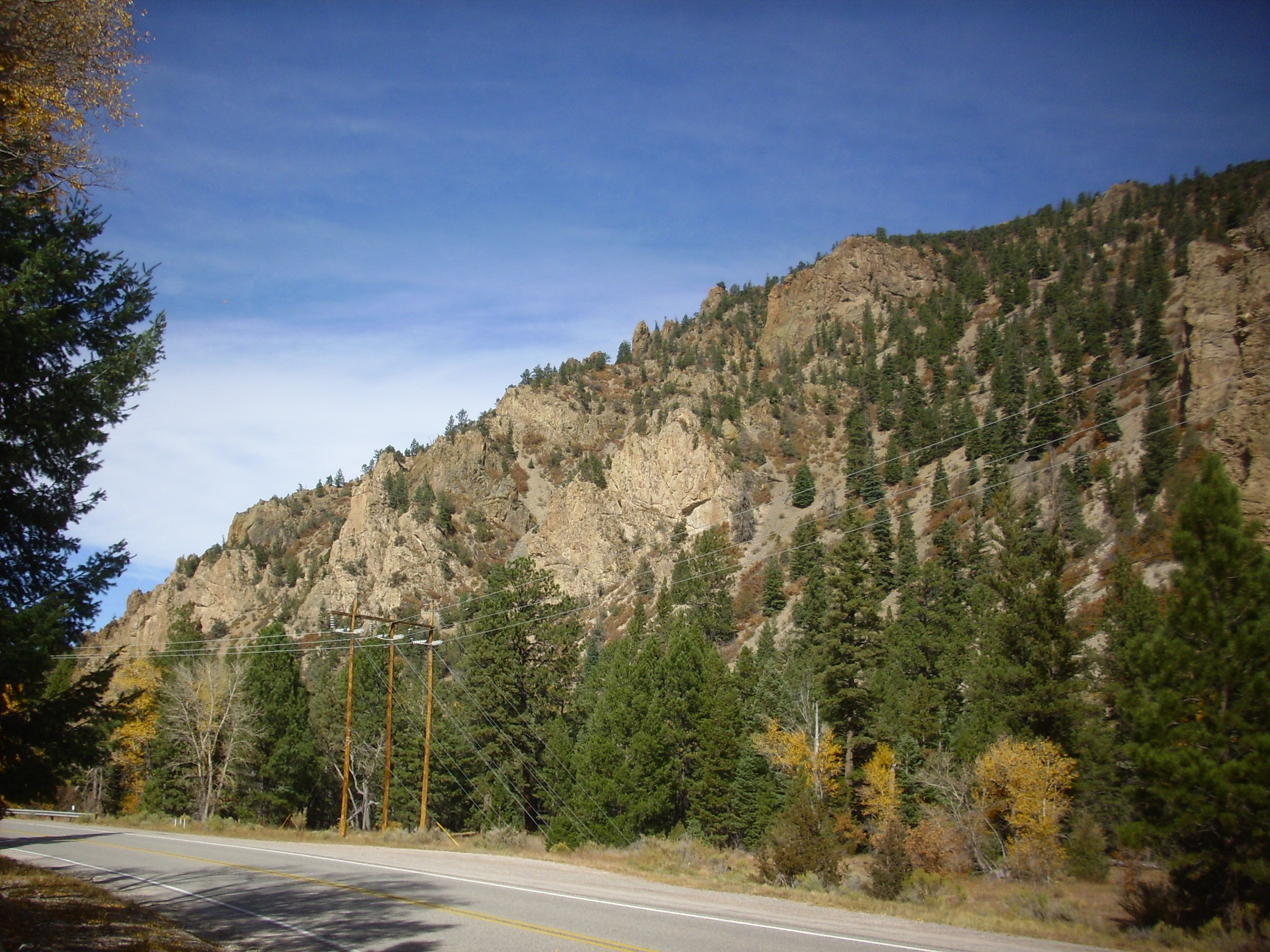
Ring dike of the Questa caldera, New Mexico, US

Ring dikes and cone sheets are special types of dikes associated with caldera volcanism. These are distributed around a shallow magma chamber. Cone sheets form when magma is injected into a shallow magma chamber, which lifts and fractures the rock beds above it. The fractures take the form of a set of concentric cones dipping at a relatively shallow angle into the magma chamber. When the caldera is subsequently emptied by explosive volcanic activity, the roof of the magma chamber collapses as a plug of rock surrounded by a ring fracture. Magma rising into the ring fracture produces a ring dike. Good examples of ring dikes and cone sheets are found in the Ardnamurchan peninsula of Scotland.

=== Other special types ===
A feeder dike is a dike that acted as a conduit for magma moving from a magma chamber to a localized intrusion. For example, the Muskox intrusion in Arctic Canada was fed by a large dike, with a thickness of 150 meters.

A sole injection is a dike injected along a thrust fault plane, where rock beds were fractured and thrust up over younger beds.

== Clastic dike ==
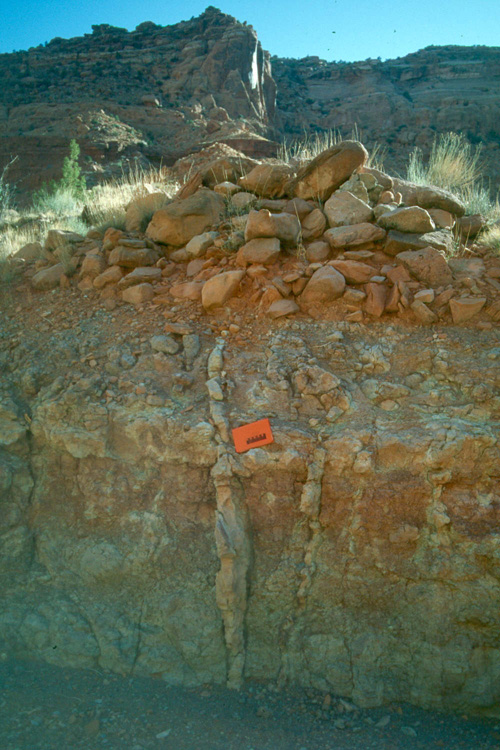
Clastic dike (left of notebook) in the Chinle Formation in Canyonlands National Park, Utah

A clastic dike (also known as a sedimentary dike) is a vertical body of sedimentary rock that interrupts other rock layers. It can form in two ways:

- When shallow unconsolidated sediment is composed of alternating coarse-grained and impermeable clay layers the fluid pressure inside the coarser layers may reach a critical value due to lithostatic overburden. Sediment driven by fluid pressure breaks through overlying layers and forms a dike.
- When a soil is under permafrost conditions the pore water is totally frozen. Cracks formed in such rocks may fill up with sediments that fall in from above.

== Gallery ==
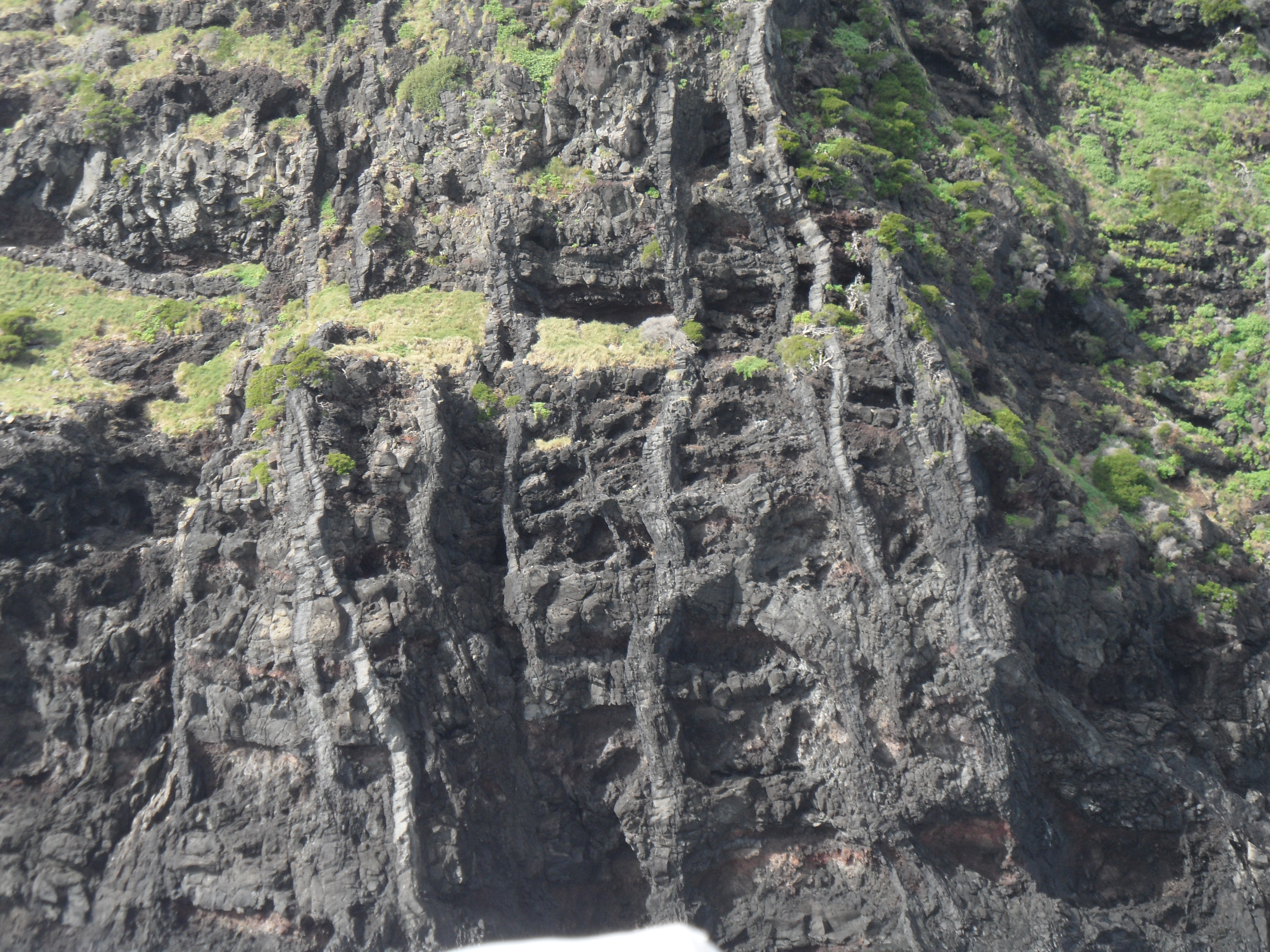
Vertical basalt dikes cutting horizontal lava flows, Lord Howe Island, Australia

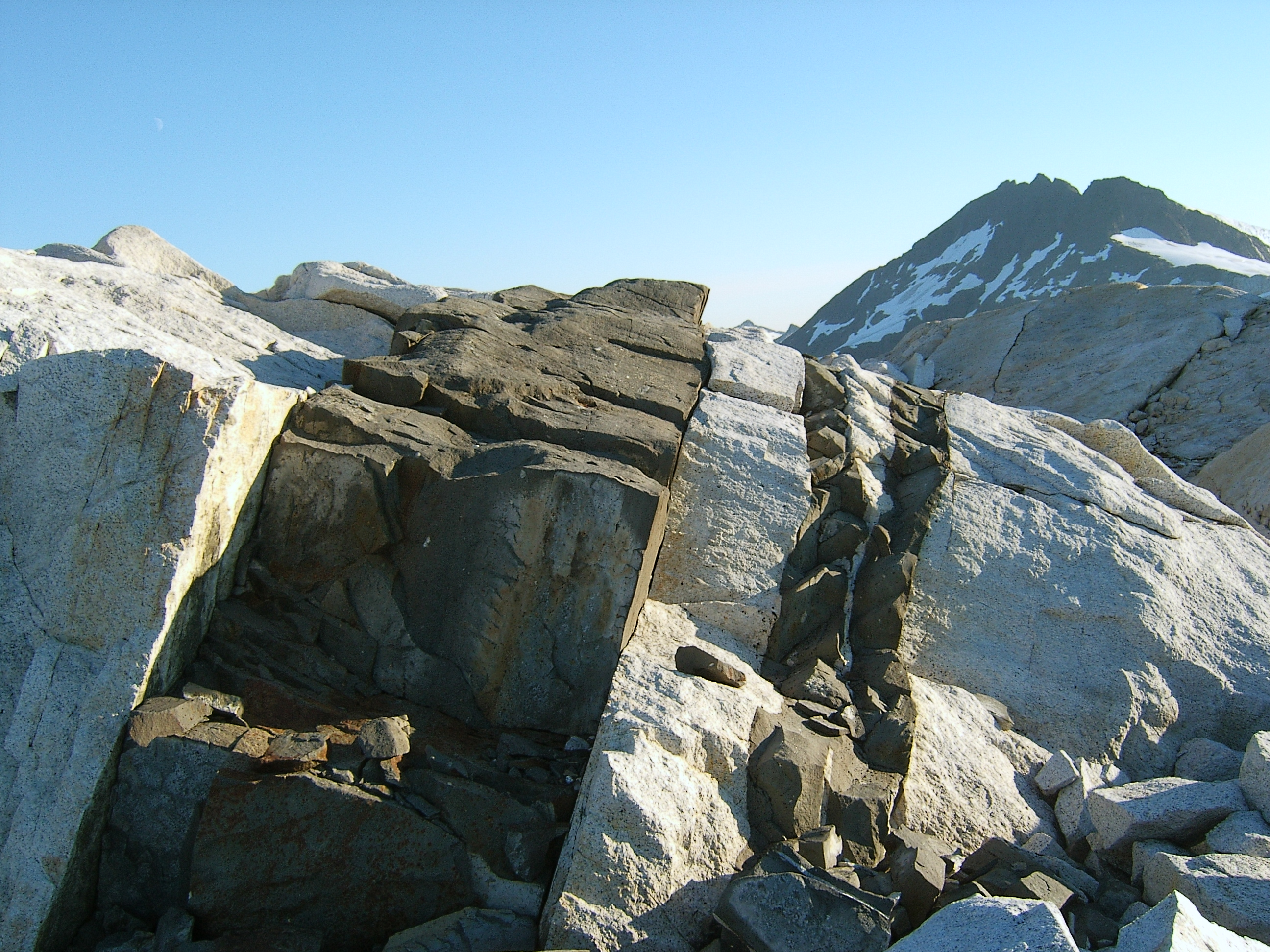
Dark dikes on Baranof Island, Alaska

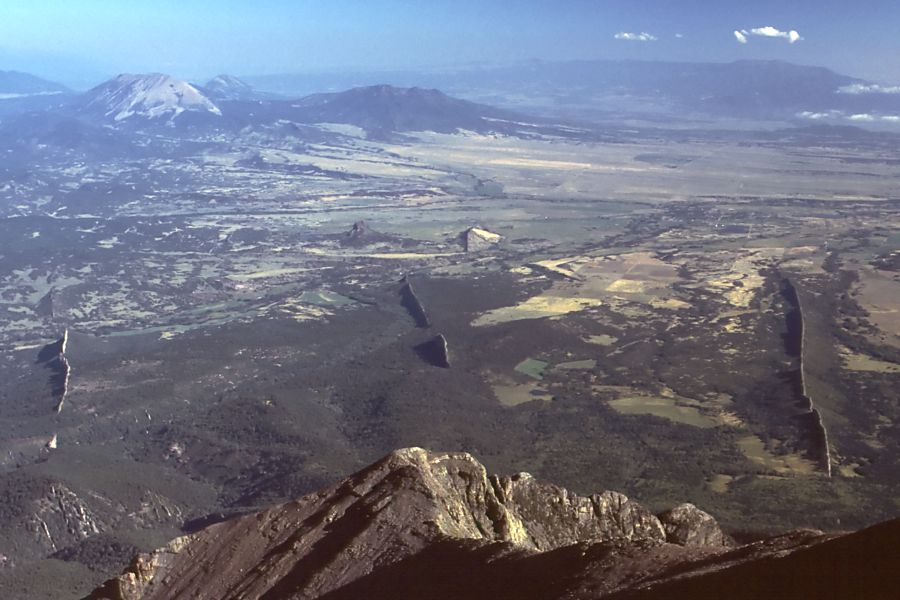
Magmatic dikes radiating from West Spanish Peak, Colorado, U.S.A.

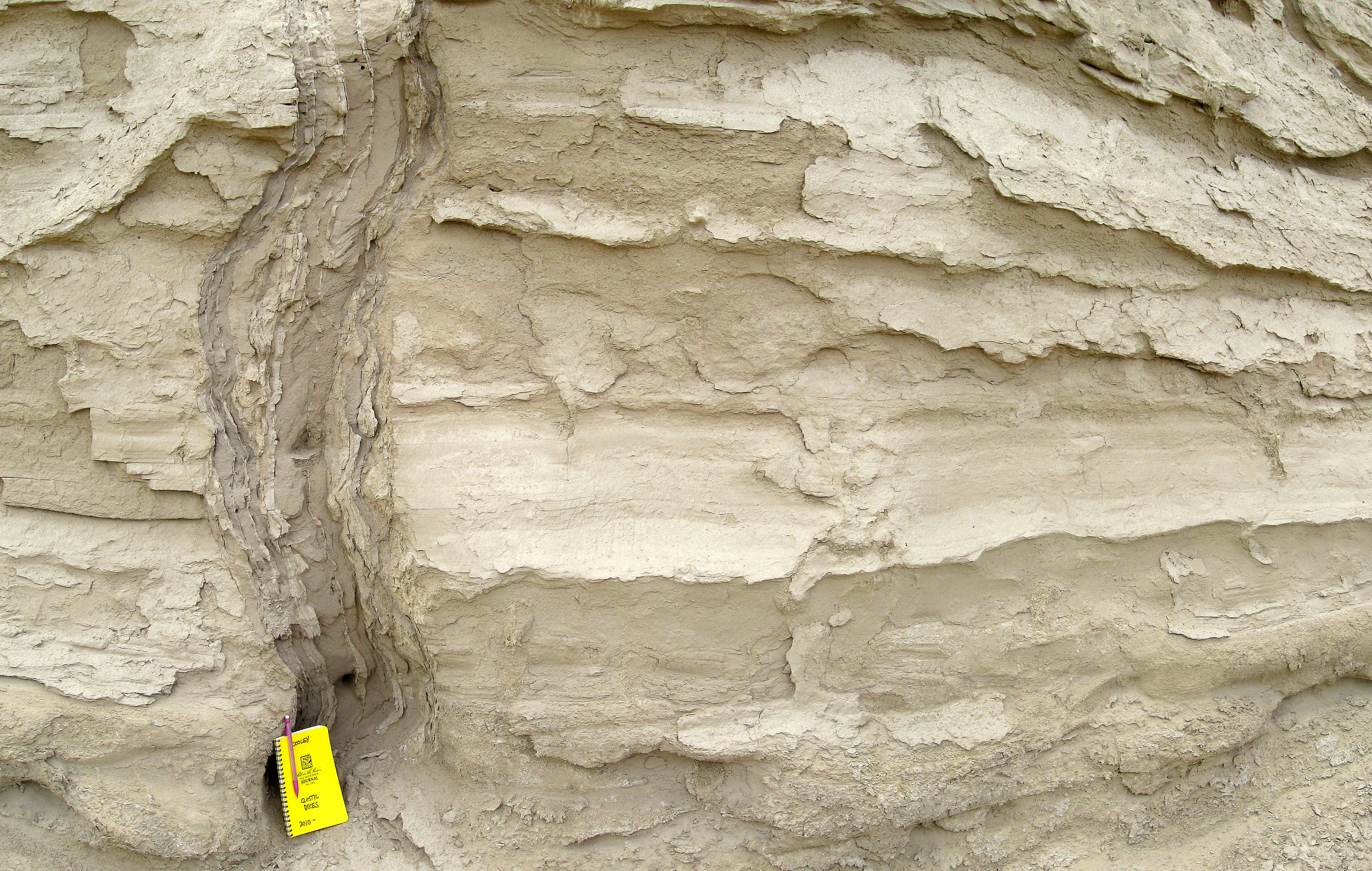
Sheeted clastic dike in Missoula flood slackwater rhythmites at Cecil, Oregon

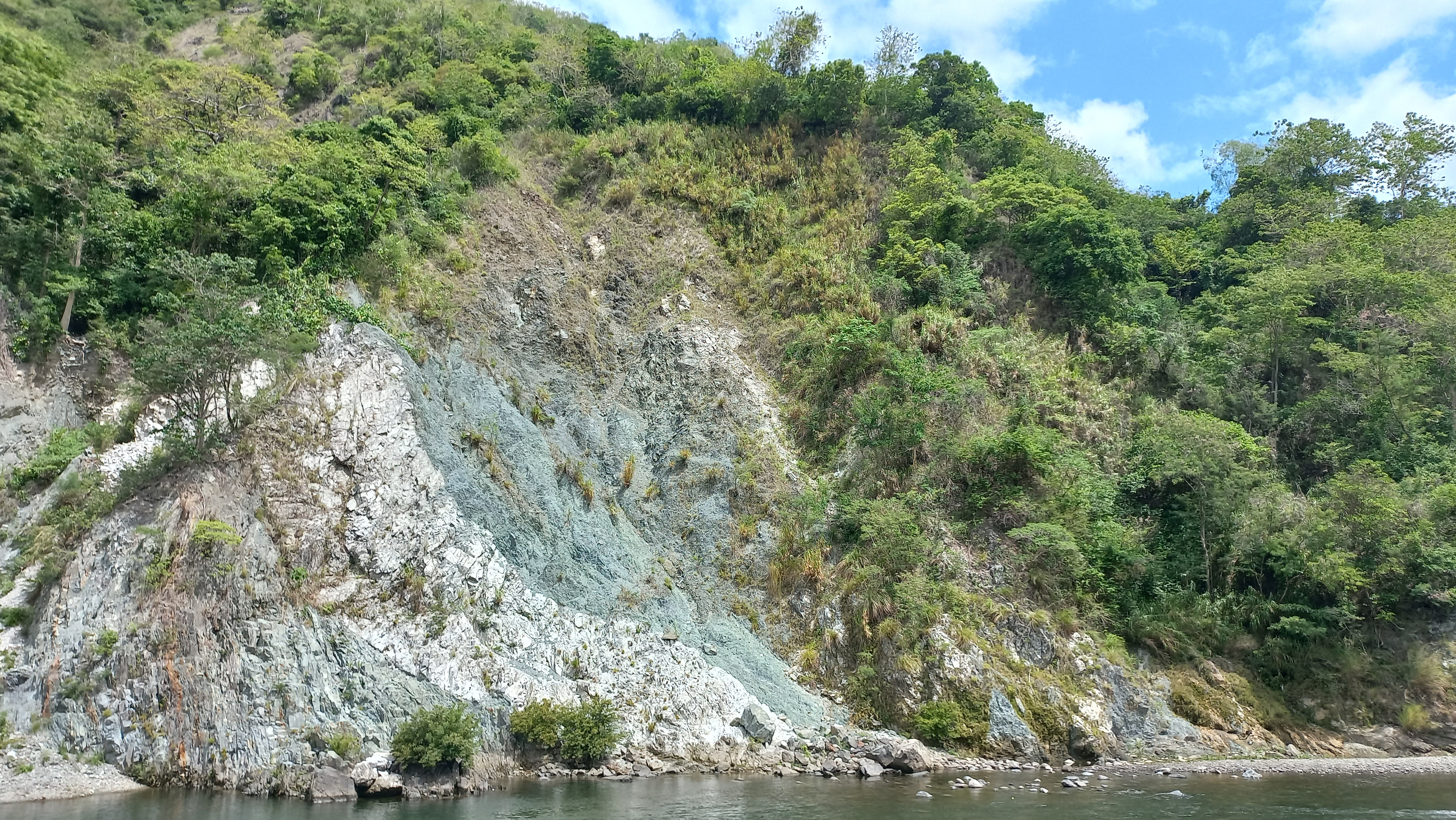
Diorite dike intruding epidote amphibole schist in Dalupirip, Itogon, Benguet, Philippines.

== See also ==
- Batholith – Large igneous rock intrusion
- Fissure vent – Linear volcanic vent through which lava erupts
- Laccolith – Mass of igneous rock formed from magma
- Runamo – Cracked dolerite dike in Sweden that was held to be a runic inscription
