= Barbertonite =

Magnesium chromium carbonate mineral

General
- Category: Carbonate mineral
- Formula: Mg_{6}(Cr,Al)_{2}(OH)_{16}CO_{3}·4H_{2}O
- Strunz classification: 5.DA.45
- Crystal system: Hexagonal
- Crystal class: Dihexagonal dipyramidal (6/mmm); H-M symbol: (6/m 2/m 2/m)
- Space group: P6_{3}/mmc
- Unit cell: a = 6.17 Å, c = 15.52 Å; Z = 1

Identification
- Color: Intense violet to rose-pink
- Crystal habit: flattened plates, in fibrous matted masses, and as cross-fiber veinlets
- Cleavage: Perfect on {0001}
- Tenacity: Flexible but not elastic
- Mohs scale hardness: 1 1/2–2
- Luster: Waxy, pearly
- Streak: Very pale violet to white
- Diaphaneity: Transparent
- Specific gravity: 2.05–2.15
- Optical properties: Uniaxial (−) may appear biaxial due to strain
- Refractive index: n_{ω} = 1.557 n_{ε} = 1.529
- Birefringence: δ = 0.028
- Pleochroism: Weak, O = dark rose-pink to violet; E = pale rose-pink to violet

Barbertonite is a magnesium chromium carbonate mineral with formula of Mg_{6}Cr_{2}(OH)_{16}CO_{3}·4H_{2}O. It is polymorphous with the mineral stichtite and, along with stichtite, is an alteration product of chromite in serpentinite. Barbertonite has a close association with stichtite, chromite, and antigorite (Taylor, 1973). Mills et al. (2011) presented evidence that barbertonite is a polytype of stichtite and should be discredited as a mineral species.

== Barbertonite family group ==
Barbertonite is a member of the hexagonal sjogrenite group along with manasseite Mg_{6}Al_{2}(OH)_{16}CO_{3}·4H_{2}O and sjogrenite Mg_{6}Fe_{2}(OH)_{16}CO_{3}·4H_{2}O (Palache et al., 1944).

The rhombohedral hydrotalcite group consists of the three minerals:
– stichtite with 3 units of Mg_{6}Cr_{2}(OH)_{16}CO_{3}·4H_{2}O;
– hydrotalcite with 3 units of Mg_{6}Al_{2}(OH)_{16}CO_{3}·4H_{2}O, and;
– pyroaurite with 3 units of Mg_{6}Fe_{2}(OH)_{16}CO_{3}·4H_{2}O.

These two isostructural groups are polymorphous in relation to each other (Palache et al., 1944).

== Structure ==
The structure of barbertonite has brucite-like layers alternating with interlayers. Neighboring brucite layers are stacked so that the hydroxyl ions (OH^{−}) are directly above one another (Taylor, 1973). In between brucite layers are interlayers containing CO^{2−}_{3} ions and H_{2}O molecules (Taylor, 1973). Oxygen atoms are accommodated in a single set of sites distributed close to the axes that pass through the hydroxyl ions of adjacent brucite layers (Taylor, 1973).

== Geologic occurrence ==
Barbertonite was first found in the Barberton district in Transvaal, South Africa. It can also be found in the Ag-Pb mine in Dumas, Tasmania, Australia (Anthony et al., 2003). Read and Dixon (1933) stated that the mineral that was found in Cunningsburgh, Shetland Islands was stichtite but it is now thought to be barbertonite because of the very similar indices of the minerals (Frondel et al. 1941). Barbertonite frequently occurs admixed with its rhombohedral analogue and as an alteration product of chromite in serpentinite (Anthony et al. 2003).
