= Myrickite =

Chalcedony variety

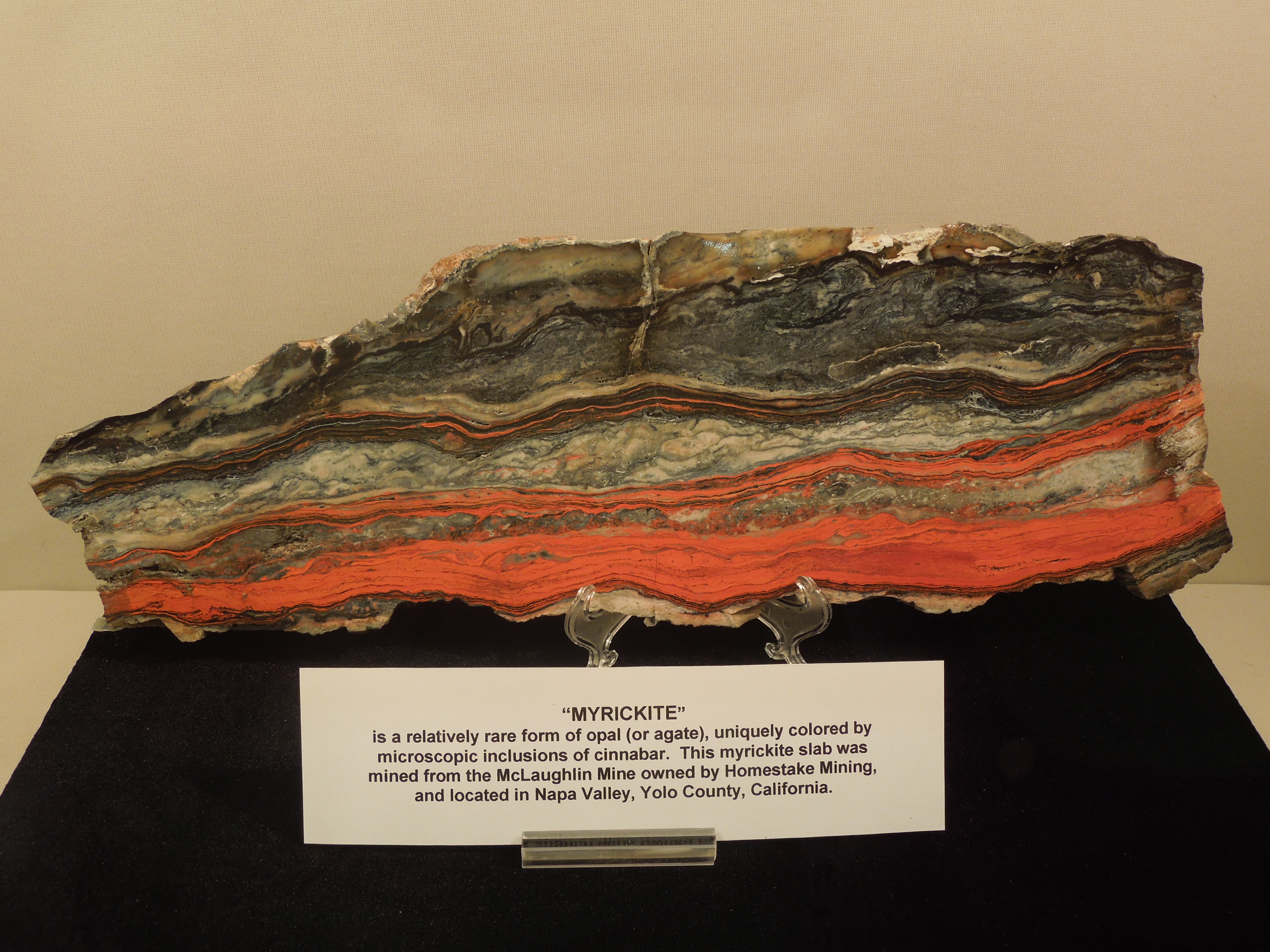
- Myrickite at the 2012 Tucson Gem & Mineral Show

General
- Category: Tectosilicate minerals
- Group: Quartz group
- Formula: SiO_{2}
- IMA status: Variety of quartz (chalcedony)
- Crystal system: Trigonal (quartz and cinnabar), monoclinic (moganite)

Identification
- Color: Gray and red
- Mohs scale hardness: 7

Myrickite is a local name used for a form of chalcedony with red inclusions of cinnabar. It has a Mohs hardness of 7. Although similar in color, this material should not be confused with the stone from China referred to as "Chicken Blood", as that material is a cinnabar stained serpentine with a hardness of 2.5-4. Unique to the United States, Myrickite is found at only one location in any quantity. During the early 1950s, Myrickite had been found in small quantities at the Manhattan Mine, located in Napa County, California, United States.

The name "Myrickite" is a lapidary term like "Montana Agate" or "Thunder Egg", not a mineral name. Myrickite is named after Francis Marion "Shady" Myrick who discovered it while prospecting in California's Death Valley in 1911.
