= Wagnerite =

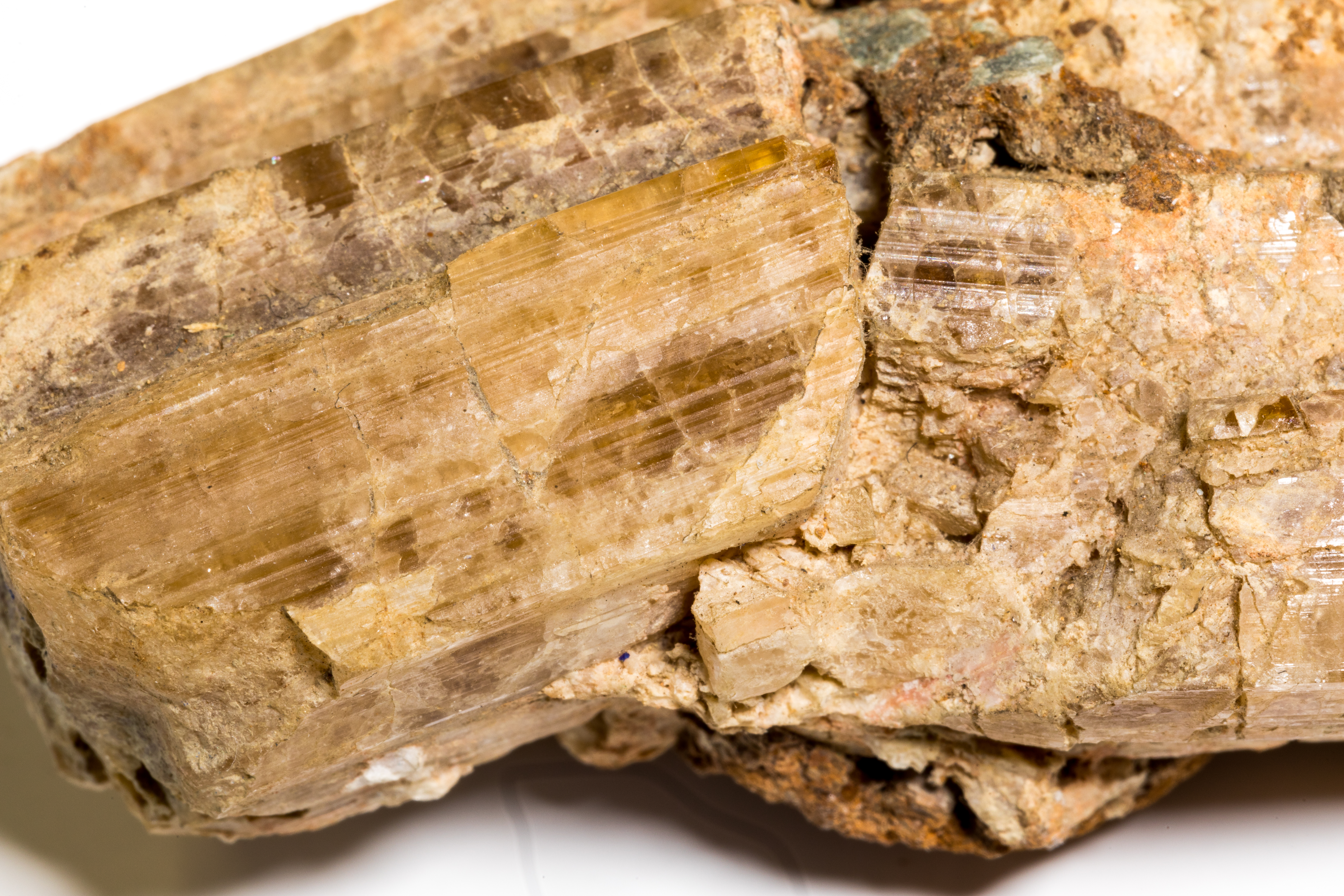

General
- Category: Phosphate mineral
- Formula: (Mg,Fe^{2+})_{2}PO_{4}F
- IMA symbol: Wag
- Strunz classification: 8.BB.15
- Dana classification: 41.6.2.1
- Crystal system: Monoclinic
- Crystal class: Prismatic (2/m)
- Space group: P2_{1}/a’’

Identification
- Color: Yellow, grayish, red, reddish brown, brown, green
- Crystal habit: Elongate and striated prisms, tabular, massive
- Cleavage: {100} imperfect, {120} imperfect
- Fracture: Sub-conchoidal, splintery
- Tenacity: Brittle
- Mohs scale hardness: 5–5.5
- Luster: Vitreous, resinous
- Diaphaneity: Translucent, nearly opaque
- Specific gravity: 3.15
- Density: 3.15 (measured), 3.15 (calculated)
- Optical properties: Biaxial (+), colorless (transmitted light)
- Pleochroism: None
- 2V angle: 25°–35° (measured)
- Solubility: Soluble in acids

Wagnerite is a mineral, a combined phosphate and fluoride of iron and magnesium, with the formula (Mg,Fe^{2+})_{2}PO_{4}F. It occurs in pegmatite associated with other phosphate minerals. It is named after Franz Michael von Wagner (1768–1851), a German mining official in Munich.

== Bibliography ==
- Palache, P.; Berman H.; Frondel, C. (1960). "Dana's System of Mineralogy, Volume II: Halides, Nitrates, Borates, Carbonates, Sulfates, Phosphates, Arsenates, Tungstates, Molybdates, Etc. (Seventh Edition)" John Wiley and Sons, Inc., New York, pp. 845–847.
