= Bostonite =

Type of intrusive rock

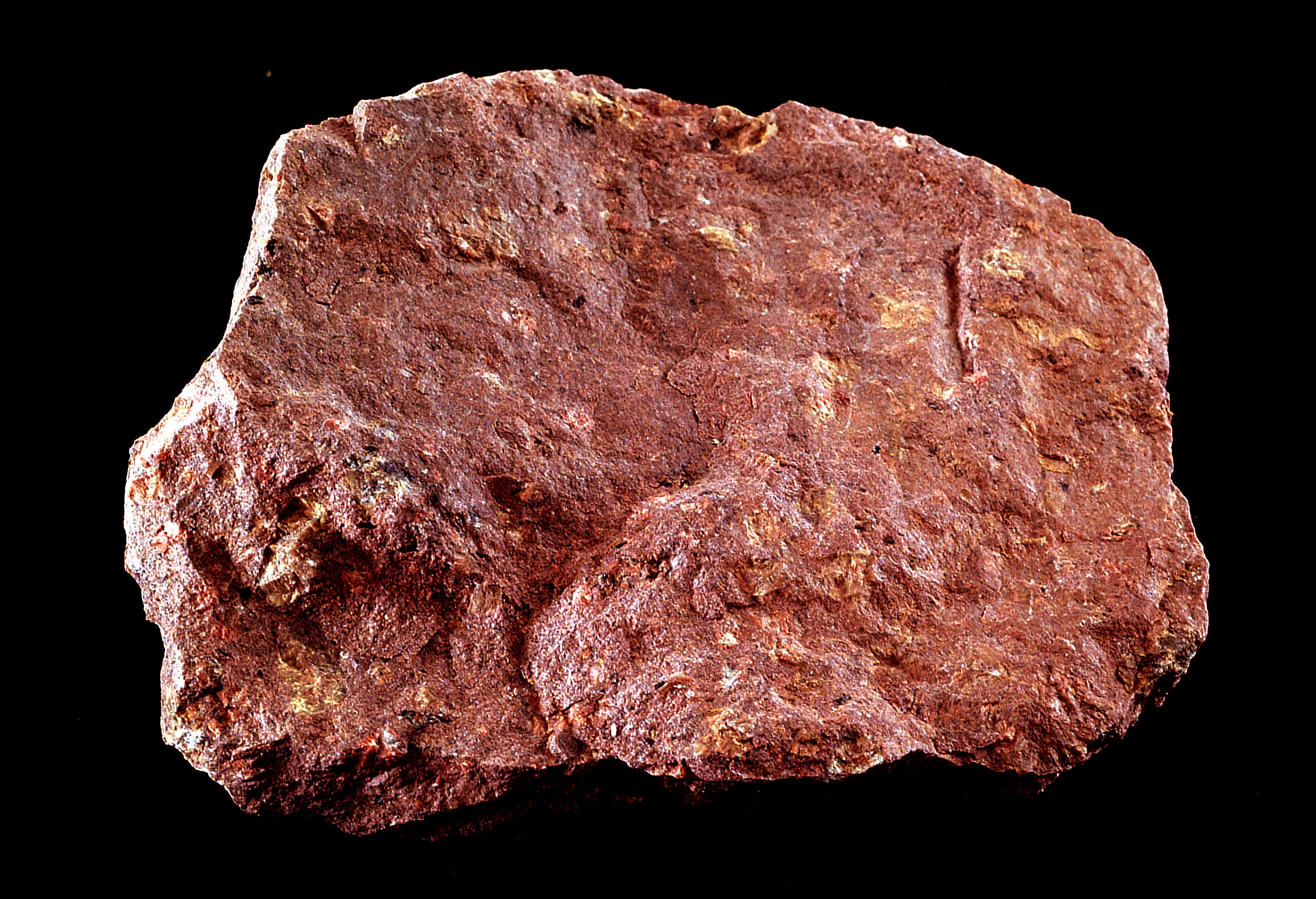
Bostonite from Essex, New York

Bostonite, in petrology, is a fine-grained, pale-colored, grey or pinkish intrusive rock, which consists essentially of alkali-feldspar (orthoclase, perthite, anorthoclase, and albite). Some samples may contain a small amount of interstitial quartz and others may have a small percentage of calcium present in a sodic plagioclase feldspar. Accessory minerals include chlorite, apatite, zircon and magnetite, with rare biotite, hornblende or pyroxene. They have compositions very similar to the trachytes and are usually grouped with them. These rocks are characterised by a 'bostonitic' texture of clusters of subparallel, divergent or radiating irregular feldspar laths in a fine grained matrix.

Typically they occur as dikes or as thin sills, often in association with nepheline syenite; and they seem to bear a complementary relationship to certain types of lamprophyre dikes. Though nowhere very common they have a wide distribution with occurrences in Scotland, Wales, Massachusetts, Ontario, Portugal, Bohemia, and other places.

The term was widely used in the geologic literature of the late 19th and early to mid 20th centuries, but is currently being discouraged in petrologic usage.
