= Quintinite =

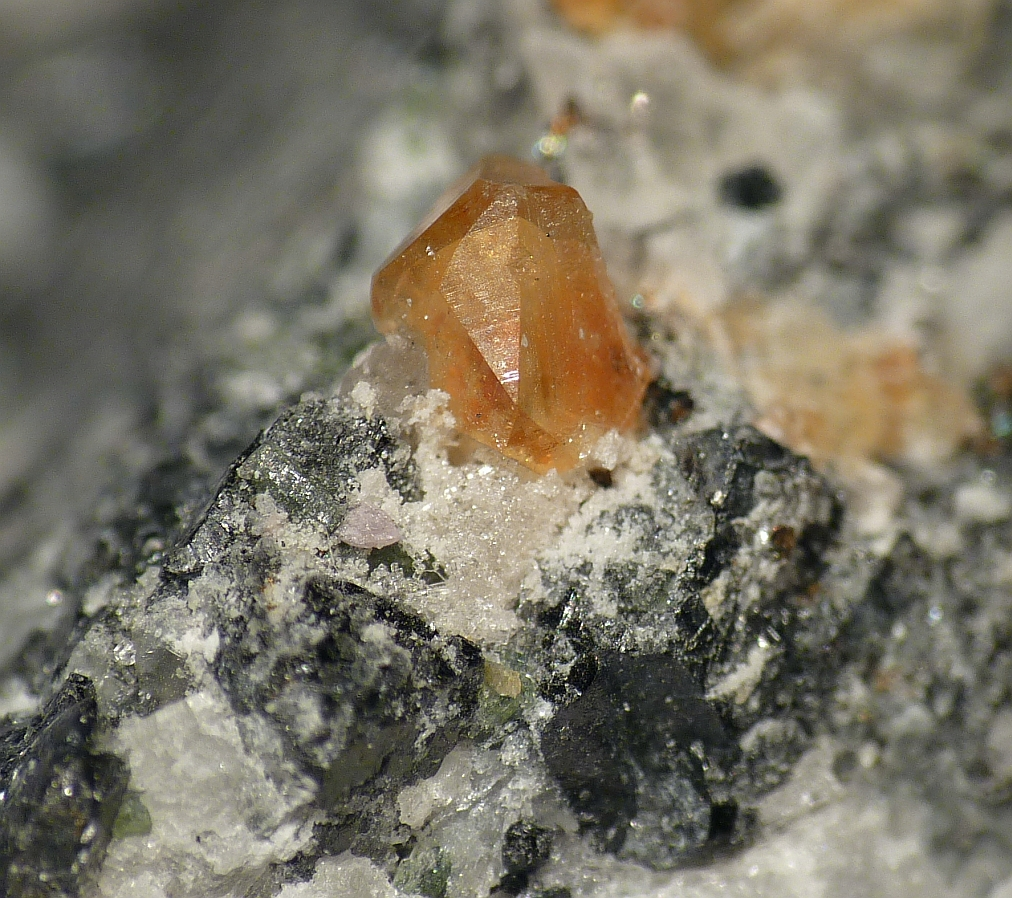
- Quintinite-2H

General
- Category: Carbonate mineral
- Formula: Mg_{4}Al_{2}(OH)_{12}CO_{3}·3H_{2}O
- IMA symbol: Qtn
- Strunz classification: 5.DA.40
- Crystal system: 2H polytype: Hexagonal; 3T polytype: Trigonal
- Crystal class: Trapezohedral (622); H-M symbol: (6 2 2)
- Space group: P6_{3}22
- Unit cell: a = 10.571, c = 15.171 [Å], Z = 4

Identification
- Color: Colorless, deep orange red, orange, pale brown
- Crystal habit: Prismatic – crystals shaped like slender prisms
- Cleavage: {0001} perfect
- Mohs scale hardness: 2
- Luster: Vitreous
- Streak: White
- Diaphaneity: Transparent
- Specific gravity: 2.14
- Optical properties: Uniaxial (±) for 2H type, uniaxial negative, for 3T polytype, uniaxial negative or positive
- Refractive index: 1.533 (isotropic)
- Pleochroism: For 2H polytype, O=yellow, E=lighter yellow; For 3T polytype, typically nonpleochroic

Quintinite is a carbonate mineral with the chemical formula Mg_{4}Al_{2}(OH)_{12}CO_{3}⋅3H_{2}O.

The mineral was named after Quintin Wight of Ottawa, Ontario, Canada (b. 1935), who was a significant contributor to mineral studies at Mont Saint-Hilaire.

Quintinite is found as 2H and 3T, or 2-hexagonal and 3-trigonal, polytypes, which were originally approved as separate species, but have not been considered species since 1998. These hexagonal and trigonal forms of quintinite are both from the hexagonal crystal systems, meaning they both have similar lengths of their crystal axes and the same angles between these axes. As a hexagonal mineral, quintinite has three axes of equal length at 60 degree angles to one another and a c axis perpendicular to these three axes of a different length. 2H occurs in carbonatite at Jacupiranga, São Paulo, Brazil, in the Jacupiranga mine and 3T occurs with minerals like gonnardite and donnayite. Both polytypes occur in hydrothermal vents in alkaline rocks. Herg (1977) interpreted the Jacupiranga area as related to a hotspot. The 3T polytype was originally found in the Poudrette quarry at Mont Saint-Hilaire, which is a rare alkaline intrusive complex. The 2H polytype is pleochroic, meaning that the mineral changes colors (in this case yellow and light yellow) when viewed at different angles under a polarizing petrographic microscope. The 3T polytype, however, is not commonly pleochroic but can show green pleochroism if it is high in iron. The 3T polytype has a positive index of refraction whereas the 2H polytype can possess crystals with either a positive or a negative index of refraction.
