= Hydrotalcite =

Hydrated Mg-Al layered double hydroxide (LDH) containing carbonate anions

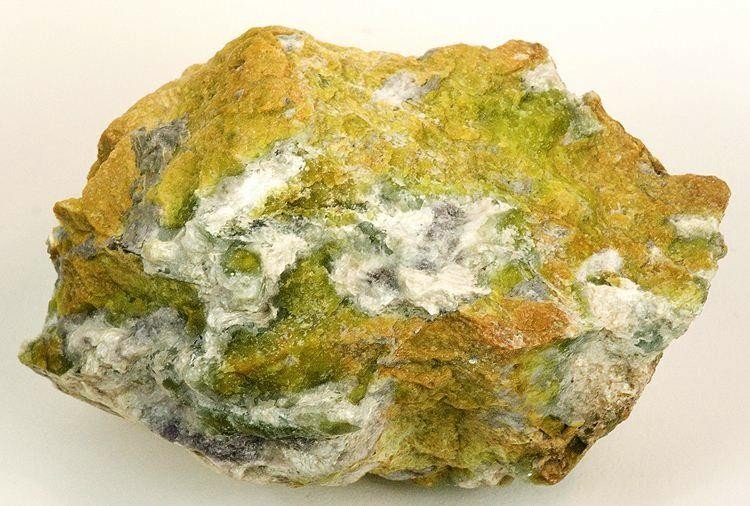
- Hydrotalcite with serpentine, Snarum, Modum, Buskerud, Norway. Size: 8.4 × 5.2 × 4.1 cm

General
- Category: Carbonate mineral
- Formula: Mg_{6}Al_{2}CO_{3}(OH)_{16}·4H_{2}O
- IMA symbol: Htc
- Strunz classification: 5.DA.50
- Crystal system: 3R polytype: Trigonal; 2H polytype: Hexagonal
- Crystal class: 3R polytype: Hexagonal scalenohedral (3̅m); H-M symbol: (3̅ 2/m); 2H polytype: Dihexagonal dipyramidal (6/mmm)
- Space group: R3̅m
- Unit cell: a = 3.065 Å, c = 23.07 Å; Z = 3

Identification
- Color: White with possible brownish tint
- Crystal habit: Subhedral platey crystals, lamellar-fibrous, rarely euhedral prismatic; commonly foliated, massive
- Cleavage: {0001}, perfect
- Tenacity: Flexible, not elastic
- Mohs scale hardness: 2
- Luster: Satiny to greasy or waxy
- Streak: White
- Diaphaneity: Transparent
- Specific gravity: 2.03–2.09
- Optical properties: Uniaxial (−)
- Refractive index: n_{ω} = 1.511 – 1.531 n_{ε} = 1.495 – 1.529
- Birefringence: δ = 0.016
- Other characteristics: Greasy feel

Hydrotalcite, or formerly also völknerite, is a layered double hydroxide (LDH) of general formula Mg_{6}Al_{2}CO_{3}(OH)_{16}·4H_{2}O, whose name is derived from its resemblance with talc and its high water content. Multiple structures containing loosely bound carbonate (CO^{2−}_{3}) ions exist. The easily exchangeable carbonates enable applications of the mineral in wastewater treatment and the immobilisation of radioactive waste after nuclear fuel reprocessing.

== Structure and discovery ==
It was first described in 1842 for an occurrence in a serpentine–magnesite deposit in Snarum, Modum, Buskerud, Norway. It occurs as an alteration mineral in serpentinite in association with serpentine, dolomite and hematite. The layers of the structure stack in multiple ways, to produce a 3-layer rhombohedral structure (3R polytype), or a 2-layer hexagonal structure (2H polytype) formerly known as manasseite. The two polytypes are often intergrown.

== Applications ==
=== Anion exchange ===
Layered double hydroxides (LDH) are well known for their anion exchange properties.

=== Wastewater treatment ===
Treating mining and other wastewater by producing hydrotalcite often produces substantially less sludge than lime. In one test, final sludge reductions reached up to 90 percent. This alters the concentration of magnesium and aluminum and raises the pH of water. As the crystals form, they trap other waste substances including radium, rare earths, anions and transition metals. The resulting mixture can be removed via settling, centrifuging, or other mechanical means.

=== Anion getter for nuclear waste disposal ===
Hydrotalcite has been studied as potential getter for iodide to scavenge the long-lived ^{129}I (T_{1/2} = 15.7 million years) and also other fission products such as ^{79}Se (T_{1/2} = 327,000 years) and ^{99}Tc, (T_{1/2} = 211,000 years) present in spent nuclear fuel to be disposed under oxidising conditions in volcanic tuff at the Yucca Mountain nuclear waste repository. However, carbonate anions easily replace iodide anions in its interlayer and therefore the selectivity coefficient for the anion exchange is not favorable. Another difficulty arising in the quest for an iodide getter for radioactive waste is the long-term stability of the sequestrant that must survive over geological time scales.

=== Medical ===
Hydrotalcite is also used as an antacid, such as Maalox (magnesium-aluminium oxide).

== See also ==
- Barbertonite
- Brucite, Mg(OH)_{2}
- Fougerite
- Layered double hydroxide (LDH)
- Magnesium hydroxide
- Stichtite
