= Balangeroite =

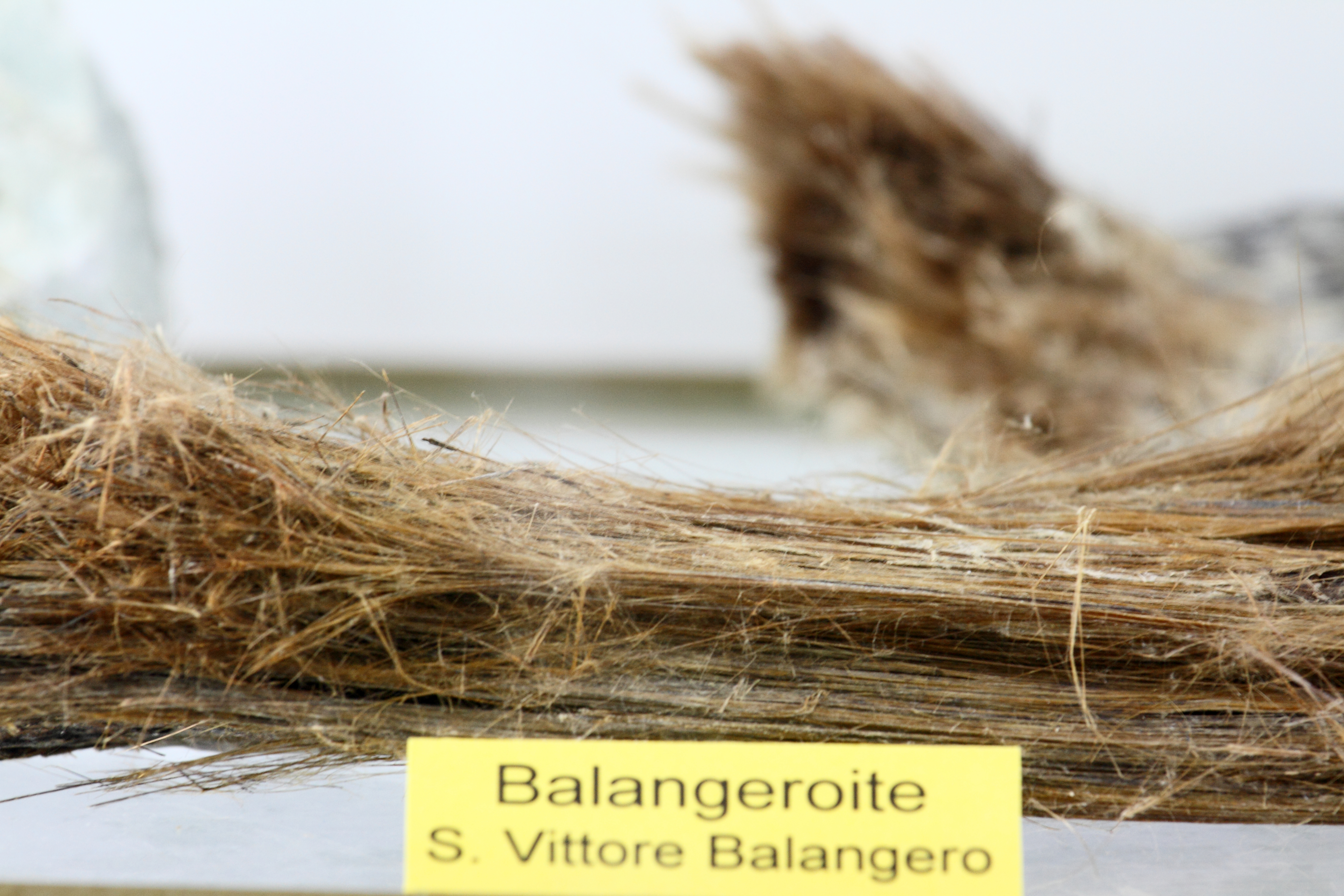
- Balangeroite

General
- Category: Inosilicate
- Formula: (Mg,Fe,Fe,Mn)_{42}Si_{16}O_{54}(OH)_{40}
- IMA symbol: Bal
- Strunz classification: 9.DH.35
- Crystal system: Monoclinic
- Crystal class: Prismatic (2/m) (same H-M symbol)
- Space group: P2/n
- Unit cell: a = 19.4 Å, b = 9.65 Å, c = 19.4 Å; β = 91.1°; Z = 2

Identification
- Color: Brown
- Crystal habit: Fibrous
- Cleavage: Very good in two directions
- Tenacity: Brittle
- Luster: Vitreous to greasy
- Streak: Brownish white
- Diaphaneity: Subtranslucent to opaque; transparent in thin section
- Specific gravity: 2.96 - 3.10
- Optical properties: Biaxial -
- Refractive index: n_{α} = 1.680 n_{γ} = 1.680
- Birefringence: δ = 0.000
- Pleochroism: Dark brown and yellow brown parallel and perpendicular to [001]

Balangeroite is found in one of the most important chrysotile mines in Europe, the Balangero "Amiantifera". Hence, it is usually mistaken as an asbestiform in an assemblage of other mineral phases like chrysotile, magnetite and Fe-Ni alloys. However, Balangeroite does not lead to serious health problems caused by asbestos fibers.

== Introduction ==
Balangeroite is classified as an inosilicate with 4-periodic single chains, Si_{4}O_{12.} It is a completely separate mineral from true asbestos. It is economically important for providing building materials, especially for thermal insulation purposes, fireproofing, etc. Recent publications by Turci have drawn some conclusions that balangeroite was not asbestos and had poor ecopersistence and biopersistence. This study also pointed out that it was the obvious chrysotile exposures there, not balangeroite, that caused the incidence of mesotheliomas.

== Composition ==
The chemical formula for balangeroite is (Mg, Fe^{2+}, Fe^{3+}, Mn^{2+})_{42}Si_{16}O_{54}(OH)_{40} and it has been calculated as shown in the diagram below by Compagnoni as follows:

Table 1a. Chemical analysis of balangeroite
SiO_{2}	28.37
TiO_{2}	0.03
Al_{2}O_{3}	0.27
Fe_{2}O_{3}	8.89
Cr_{2}O_{3}	0.03
FeO	16.95
MnO	3.59
MgO	31.81
CaO	0.13
H_{2}O	9.93
Total	100.00

Wet chemical, X-ray fluorescence and electron microprobe analyses were used to deduce the composition of balangeroite. The common intergrowth with chrysotile proved to be valuable in providing better chemical resolution, as portrayed in Table 1. The results varied due to submicroscopic intergrowths or zoning. From the wet chemical analysis, there was 9.5% average weight loss after calcination at 1000 °C, due to the presence of water. This was calculated as the difference from 100% of the microprobe results, with the assumption that large quantities of material usually contain some impurities, and the possible oxidation of Fe^{2+} under heating. A ratio of Fe^{2+}/Fe^{3+} = 2.12 was obtained, and on the basis of the known volume and density, the empirical formula for the unit cell was derived (Mg _{25.70} Fe^{2+}_{7.69} Fe^{3+}_{3.63} Mn^{2+}_{1.65} Al_{0.17} Ca_{0.07} Cr_{0.01} Ti_{0.01}) total = 38.93 Si_{15.38}O_{53.66}(OH)_{35.92.}

== Structure ==
Balangeroite is based on an octahedral build that consists of channels that are filled by chains of silicate tetrahedra grouped in three and 4 rows running along the fiber axis. Balangeroite is isostructural to gageite.

In contrast to chrysotile, however, balangeroite has more metal ions than silicon ions and might be in some cases seen as complex iron oxide containing some type of silicate structure in its framework. The surrounding fluid takes in a large number of the cations which are octahedrally coordinated, which unlike amphiboles, may be easily removed. As a consequence, the Mg and Fe are released forcing the silicate structure to become loosely bound and therefore pass into solution. Further tests have been conducted on Balangeroite's ecopersistence and it showed fairly low eco-persistence at neutral pH. Further studies were conducted by imitating weathering in an experiment to predict if weathered fibers retain the toxic potential present in freshly extracted fibers. The tests proved that balangeroite showed the removal of Mg and Si, which shows continuous structural severance that extends far beyond the surface.

== Physical properties ==
Balangeroite can develop as loose fibers or be compact when in large volumes, which can be prismatic. Antigorite flakes are included in relict prismatic balangeroite, while transmission electron microscopy observation shows that fibrous balangeroite is partially replaced by chrysotile. The fibers run for a couple of centimeters in [001].

== Geologic occurrences ==
The piemonte zone, remnant of the Piemontese Ocean from the Late Jurassic, is home to the majority of the serpentines of the Western Alps. The Balangero mine is located in the Lanzo Ultramafic Massif which is in the inner part of the piemonte zone. The Lanzu Ultramafic Massif is believed to have been involved in the subduction processes that were affiliated with the closure of the Piemontese Ocean in the Late Jurassic. The earliest generation of metamorphic veins and in particular type 1 Vein that constitute relict prismatic balangeroite (often includes antigorite flakes) were formed during prograde high pressure metamorphism. Fibrous balangeroite is limited to the serpentine-infested rim of the northern Lanzo Ultramafic Massif, with its abundance in the inactive Balangero asbestos mine, where it was discovered.

Balangeroite was named after the location in which it was discovered. Mine workers at the Balangero mine had first discovered it and named it, based on its overall color and fibrous nature of other minerals present in the mine, xylotile or metaxite. This new mineral, balangeroite, was tested and found to be completely different from xylotile and metaxite in composition as well as optical properties. Balangeroite was already discovered and a somewhat pure specimen was in the Turin University Mineralogy institute's museum since 1925, inventory no. 14873, labeled as "fibrous serpentine (asbestos)- San Vittore, Balangero".
