= Zaccagnaite =

Carbonate mineral

General
- Category: Minerals
- Formula: formula Zn_{4}Al_{2}CO_{3}(OH)_{12}·3H_{2}O
- IMA symbol: Zac
- Crystal system: Hexagonal

Identification
- Color: White
- Streak: White
- Optical properties: Uniaxial (-)

Zaccagnaite is a mineral, with a formula Zn_{4}Al_{2}CO_{3}(OH)_{12}·3H_{2}O. It occurs as white hexagonal crystals associated with calcite in cavites in Carrara marble of the Italian Alps and is thought to have formed by hydrothermal alteration of sphalerite in an aluminium rich environment. It is named after Domenico Zaccagna (1851–1940), an Italian mineral collector.

== See also ==
- List of minerals
- List of minerals named after people
