= Ericssonite =

General
- Category: Sorosilicates
- Formula: BaMn_{2}FeO[Si_{2}O_{7}](OH)
- IMA symbol: Ers
- Crystal system: Monoclinic
- Crystal class: Prismatic (2/m) (same H-M symbol)
- Space group: C2/m
- Unit cell: a= 20.42, b= 7.03 c= 5.34 [Å], β= 95.5°; Z = 4

Identification
- Color: deep reddish black
- Crystal habit: Massive - uniformly indistinguishable crystals forming large masses
- Cleavage: perfect, perfect on (100) fair on (011)
- Tenacity: very brittle
- Mohs scale hardness: 4.5
- Luster: sub metallic
- Streak: brown
- Diaphaneity: Translucent to opaque
- Density: 4.21
- Refractive index: 1.802-1.891
- Pleochroism: x= pale greenish tan, y= red-brown, z= deep brown
- Other characteristics: weakly magnetic

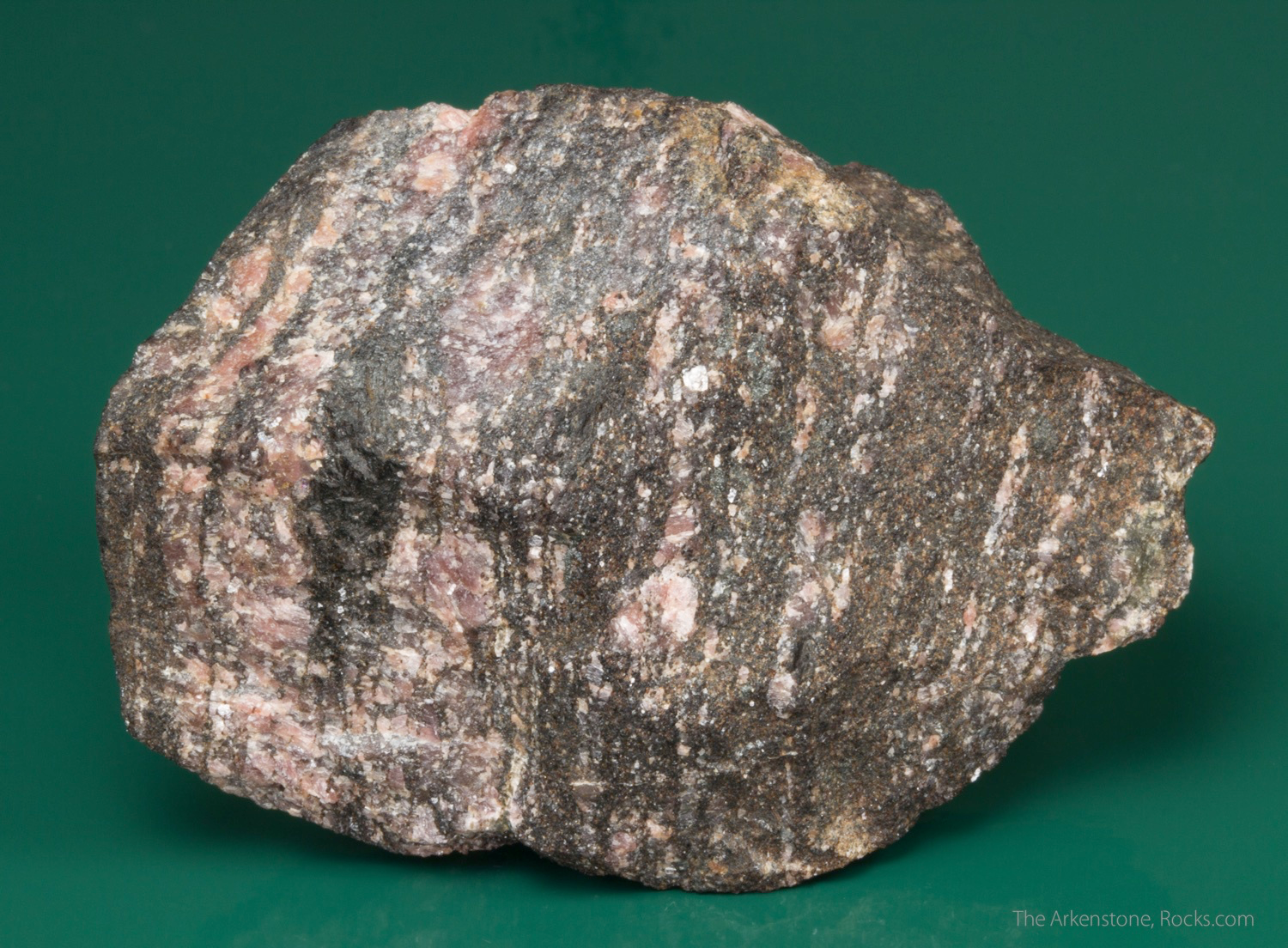

Ericssonite has a general formula of BaMn_{2}FeO[Si_{2}O_{7}](OH). It was discovered in 1967 and named after John Ericsson (July 31, 1803 – March 8, 1889), a well known Swedish American inventor, engineer and designer of the iron-clad ship USS Monitor. Ericssonite was discovered in the Jakobsberg Mine in Värmland, Sweden.

Ericcsonite is monoclinic; this means it contains three unequal vectors, two of these vector angles are perpendicular while the other is at an angle greater than 90°. Optically ericssonite is anisotropic which means that the mineral has more than one index of refraction, causing light to vary in speed depending on which axis it is traveling through. Since ericssonite is monoclinic, containing three unequal vectors, it has three indices of refraction. Ericssonite is usually a deep reddish-black in color.

Ericssonite is only found in the Langban mine in Sweden, associated with a metamorphic manganese orebody. Also it is always inter-grown with orthoericssonite, which is almost identical to ericssonite except it contains extra silicon and oxygen in its chemical formula.
