= Stichtite =

Hydrotalcite group mineral

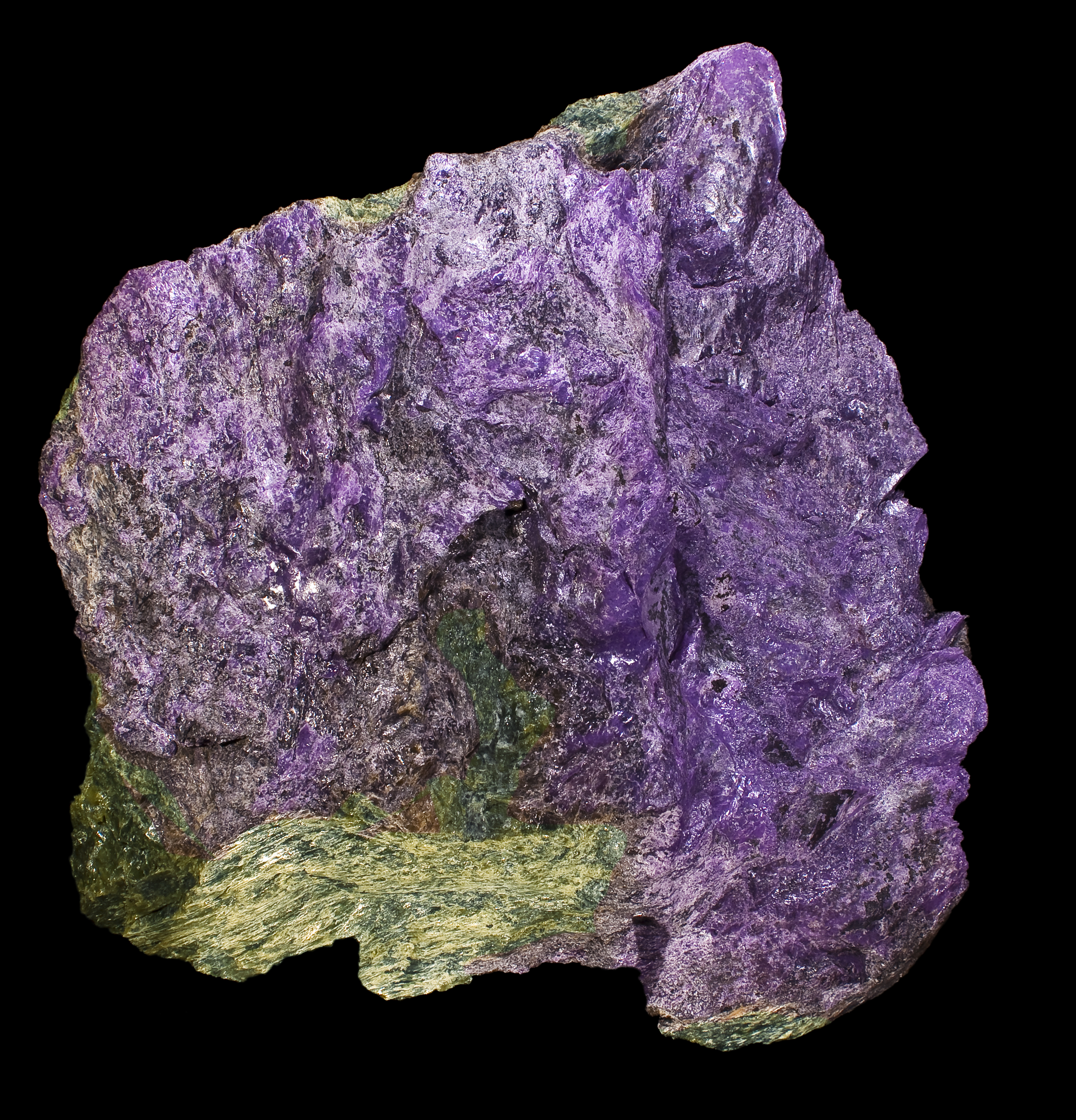
- Stichtite on serpentine, Dundas, Tasmania

General
- Category: Carbonate minerals
- Formula: Mg_{6}Cr_{2}CO_{3}(OH)_{16}·4H_{2}O
- IMA symbol: Stt
- Strunz classification: 5.DA.50
- Crystal system: Trigonal
- Crystal class: Hexagonal scalenohedral (3̅m); H-M symbol: (3̅ 2/m)
- Space group: R3̅m
- Unit cell: a = 6.19, c = 46.47 [Å]; Z = 3

Identification
- Colour: Lilac to rose-pink
- Crystal habit: Fibrous to platy aggregates
- Cleavage: Perfect on {0001}
- Tenacity: flexible, not elastic
- Mohs scale hardness: 1.5–2
- Lustre: Waxy to resinous
- Streak: Very pale lilac to white
- Diaphaneity: Transparent
- Specific gravity: 2.16
- Optical properties: Uniaxial (+)
- Refractive index: n_{ω} = 1.516 n_{ε} = 1.542
- Birefringence: δ = 0.026
- Pleochroism: Weak; O = dark rose-pink to lilac E = light rose-pink to lilac

Stichtite in serpentine from South Africa

Stichtite is a mineral, a carbonate of chromium and magnesium; formula Mg_{6}Cr_{2}CO_{3}(OH)_{16}·4H_{2}O. Its colour ranges from pink through lilac to a rich purple colour. It is formed as an alteration product of chromite-containing serpentine. It occurs in association with barbertonite (the hexagonal polymorph of Mg_{6}Cr_{2}CO_{3}(OH)_{16}·4H_{2}O), chromite and antigorite.

Discovered in 1910 on the west coast of Tasmania, Australia, it was first recognised by A.S. Wesley a former chief chemist with the Mount Lyell Mining and Railway Company, it was named after Robert Carl Sticht the manager of the mine.

It is observed in combination with green serpentine at Stichtite Hill near the Dundas Extended Mine, Dundas – east of Zeehan, as well as on the southern shore of Macquarie Harbour. It is exhibited in the West Coast Pioneers Museum in Zeehan. The only commercial mine for stichtite serpentine is located on Stichtite Hill. Stichtite has also been reported from the Barberton District, Transvaal; Darwendale, Zimbabwe; near Bou Azzer, Morocco; Cunningsburgh, the Shetland Islands of Scotland; Langban, Varmland, Sweden; the Altai Mountains, Russia; Langmuir Township, Ontario and the Megantic, Quebec; Bahia, Brazil; and the Keonjhar district, Orissa, India.

It is sometimes used as a gemstone.

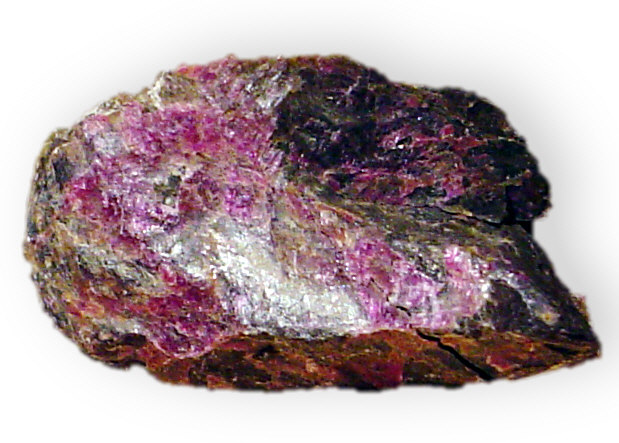
Stichtite on serpentine, New Amianthus Mine, Transvaal South Africa
