= Oxide mineral =

Class of minerals containing oxygen

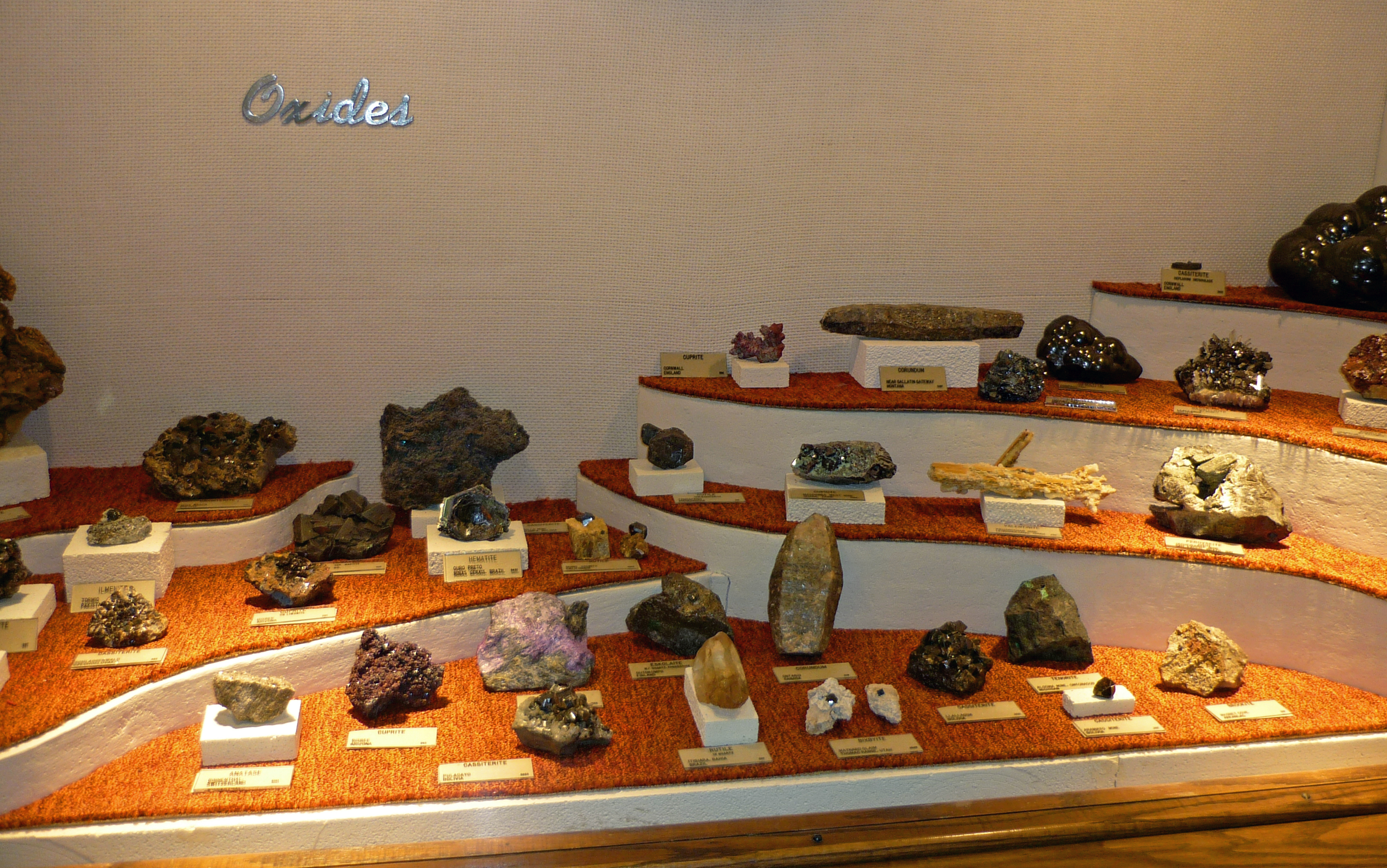
Oxide mineral exhibit at the Museum of Geology in South Dakota

The oxide mineral class includes those minerals in which the oxide anion (O^{2−}) is bonded to one or more metal alloys. The hydroxide-bearing minerals are typically included in the oxide class. Minerals with complex anion groups such as the silicates, sulfates, carbonates and phosphates are classed separately.

== Simple oxides ==
- XO form
  - Periclase group
    - Periclase MgO
    - Manganosite MnO
  - Zincite group
    - Zincite ZnO
    - Bromellite BeO
    - Tenorite CuO
    - Litharge PbO
- X_{2}O form
  - Cuprite Cu_{2}O
  - Ice H_{2}O
- X_{2}O_{3} form
  - Hematite group
    - Corundum Al_{2}O_{3}
    - Hematite Fe_{2}O_{3}
    - Ilmenite FeTiO_{3}
- XO_{2} form
  - Rutile group
    - Rutile TiO_{2}
    - Pyrolusite MnO_{2}
    - Cassiterite SnO_{2}
  - Baddeleyite ZrO_{2}
  - Uraninite UO_{2}
  - Thorianite ThO_{2}
- XY_{2}O_{4} form
  - Spinel group
    - Spinel MgAl_{2}O_{4}
    - Gahnite ZnAl_{2}O_{4}
    - Magnetite Fe_{3}O_{4} (Fe^{2+}Fe^{3+}_{2}O_{4})
    - Franklinite (Zn,Fe,Mn)(Fe,Mn)_{2}O_{4}
    - Chromite FeCr_{2}O_{4}
  - Chrysoberyl BeAl_{2}O_{4}
  - Columbite (Fe,Mn)(Nb,Ta)_{2}O_{6}
- Hydroxide subgroup:
  - Brucite Mg(OH)_{2}
  - Manganite MnO(OH)
  - Romanèchite BaMn^{2+}Mn^{4+}_{8}O_{16}(OH)_{4}
  - Goethite group:
    - Diaspore αAlO(OH)
    - Goethite αFeO(OH)

== Nickel–Strunz class 4: oxides ==
IMA-CNMNC proposes a new hierarchical scheme (Mills et al., 2009). This list uses it to modify the Nickel–Strunz classification (mindat.org, 10 ed, pending publication).

- Abbreviations:
  - "*": discredited (IMA/CNMNC status)
  - "?": questionable/doubtful (IMA/CNMNC status)
  - "REE": Rare-earth element (Sc, Y, La, Ce, Pr, Nd, Pm, Sm, Eu, Gd, Tb, Dy, Ho, Er, Tm, Yb, Lu)
  - "PGE": Platinum-group element (Ru, Rh, Pd, Os, Ir, Pt)
  - 03.C Aluminofluorides, 06 Borates, 08 Vanadates (04.H V^{[5,6]} Vanadates), 09 Silicates:
    - Neso: insular (from Greek: νησος, romanized: nēsos, lit. 'island')
    - Soro: grouping (from Greek: σωροῦ, romanized: sōros; heap, mound (especially of corn))
    - Cyclo: ring
    - Ino: chain (from Greek: ις [genitive: ινος, inos], fibre)
    - Phyllo: sheet (from Greek: φύλλον, romanized: phyllon, lit. 'leaf')
    - Tekto: three-dimensional framework
- Nickel–Strunz code scheme: NN.XY.##x
  - NN: Nickel–Strunz mineral class number
  - X: Nickel–Strunz mineral division letter
  - Y: Nickel–Strunz mineral family letter
  - ##x: Nickel–Strunz mineral/group number, x add-on letter

=== Class: oxides ===
- 04.A Metal:Oxygen = 2.1 and 1:1
  - 04.AA Cation:Anion (M:O) = 2:1 (and 1.8:1): 05 Ice, 10 Cuprite, 15 Paramelaconite
  - 04.AB M:O = 1:1 (and up to 1:1.25); with small to medium-sized cations only: 05 Crednerite, 10 Tenorite; 15 Delafossite, 15 Mcconnellite; 20 Bromellite, 20 Zincite; 25 Lime, 25 Bunsenite, 25 Monteponite, 25 Manganosite, 25 Periclase, 25 Wüstite
  - 04.AC M:O = 1:1 (and up to 1:1.25); with large cations (± smaller ones): 05 Swedenborgite; 10 Brownmillerite, 10 Srebrodolskite; 15 Montroydite, 20 Litharge, 20 Romarchite, 25 Massicot
- 04.B Metal:Oxygen = 3:4 and similar
  - 04.BA With small and medium-sized cations: 05 Chrysoberyl, 10 Manganostibite
  - 04.BB With only medium-sized cations: 05 Filipstadite, 05 Donathite?, 05 Gahnite, 05 Galaxite, 05 Hercynite, 05 Spinel, 05 Cochromite, 05 Chromite, 05 Magnesiochromite, 05 Manganochromite, 05 Nichromite, 05 Zincochromite, 05 Magnetite, 05 Cuprospinel, 05 Franklinite, 05 Jacobsite, 05 Magnesioferrite, 05 Trevorite, 05 Brunogeierite, 05 Coulsonite, 05 Magnesiocoulsonite, 05 Qandilite, 05 Ulvospinel, 05 Vuorelainenite; 10 Hydrohetaerolite, 10 Hausmannite, 10 Iwakiite, 10 Hetaerolite; 15 Maghemite, 20 Tegengrenite, 25 Xieite
  - 04.BC With medium-sized and large cations: 05 Marokite, 10 Dmitryivanovite
  - 04.BD With only large cations: 05 Minium
- 04.C Metal:Oxygen = 2:3, 3:5, and Similar
  - 04.CB With medium-sized cations: 05 Tistarite, 05 Auroantimonate*, 05 Brizziite-VII, 05 Brizziite-III, 05 Corundum, 05 Eskolaite, 05 Hematite, 05 Karelianite, 05 Geikielite, 05 Ecandrewsite, 05 Ilmenite, 05 Pyrophanite, 05 Melanostibite, 05 Romanite*; 10 Bixbyite, 10 Avicennite; 15 Armalcolite, 15 Mongshanite*, 15 Pseudobrookite; 20 Magnesiohogbomite-6N6S, 20 Magnesiohogbomite-2N3S, 20 Magnesiohogbomite-2N2S, 20 Zincohogbomite-2N2S, 20 Ferrohogbomite-2N2S; 25 Pseudorutile, 25 Ilmenorutile; 30 Oxyvanite, 30 Berdesinskiite; 35 Olkhonskite, 35 Schreyerite; 40 Kamiokite, 40 Nolanite, 40 Rinmanite; 45 Stibioclaudetite, 45 Claudetite; 50 Arsenolite, 50 Senarmontite; 55 Valentinite, 60 Bismite, 65 Sphaerobismoite, 70 Sillenite, 75 Kyzylkumite
  - 04.CC With large and medium-sized cations: 05 Chrombismite, 10 Freudenbergite, 15 Grossite, 20 Mayenite, 25 Yafsoanite; 30 Barioperovskite, 30 Lakargiite, 30 Natroniobite, 30 Latrappite, 30 Lueshite, 30 Perovskite; 35 Macedonite, 35 Isolueshite, 35 Loparite-(Ce), 35 Tausonite; 40 Crichtonite, 40 Dessauite, 40 Davidite-(Ce), 40 Davidite-(La), 40 Mathiasite, 40 Lindsleyite, 40 Landauite, 40 Loveringite, 40 Loveringite, 40 Cleusonite, 40 Gramaccioliite-(Y); 45 Hawthorneite, 45 Magnetoplumbite, 45 Haggertyite, 45 Batiferrite, 45 Hibonite, 45 Nezilovite, 45 Yimengite, 45 Diaoyudaoite, 45 Lindqvistite, 45 Plumboferrite; 50 Jeppeite, 55 Zenzenite, 60 Mengxianminite*
- 04.D Metal:Oxygen = 1:2 and similar
  - 04.DA With small cations
    - (moved to -09- Subclass: tektosilicates)
  - 04.DB With medium-sized cations; chains of edge-sharing octahedra: 05 Tripuhyite, 05 Tugarinovite, 05 Varlamoffite*, 05 Argutite, 05 Cassiterite, 05 Rutile, 05 Pyrolusite, 05 Plattnerite, 05 Squawcreekite?; 10 Bystromite, 10 Ordonezite, 10 Tapiolite-(Fe), 10 Tapiolite-(Mn), 10 Tapiolite*, 15a Paramontroseite, 15a Ramsdellite, 15b Akhtenskite, 15c Nsutite; 20 Scrutinyite; 25 Ixiolite, 25 Ishikawaite, 25 Srilankite, 25 Samarskite-(Y), 25 Samarskite-(Yb), 25 Yttrocolumbite-(Y); 30 Heftetjernite, 30 Wolframoixiolite*, 30 Krasnoselskite*, 30 Ferberite, 30 Hubnerite, 30 Sanmartinite, 30 Wolframite*; 35 Tantalite-(Mg), 35 Tantalite-(Fe), 35 Tantalite-(Mn), 35 Columbite-(Mg), 35 Columbite-(Fe), 35 Columbite-(Mn), 35 Qitianlingite; 40 Ferrowodginite, 40 Lithiotantite, 40 Lithiowodginite, 40 Tantalowodginite*, 40 Titanowodginite, 40 Wodginite, 40 Ferrotitanowodginite; 45 Tivanite, 50 Carmichaelite, 55 Alumotantite, 60 Biehlite
  - 04.DC With medium-sized cations; sheets of edge-sharing octahedra: 05 Bahianite, 10 Simpsonite
  - 04.DD With medium-sized cations; frameworks of edge-sharing octahedra: 05 Anatase, 10 Brookite
  - 04.DE With medium-sized cations; with various polyhedra: 05 Downeyite, 10 Koragoite; 15 Koechlinite, 15 Russellite, 15 Tungstibite; 20 Tellurite, 25 Paratellurite; 30 Cervantite, 30 Bismutotantalite, 30 Bismutocolumbite, 30 Clinocervantite, 30 Stibiocolumbite, 30 Stibiotantalite; 35 IMA2007-058, 35 Baddeleyite
  - 04.DF With large (± medium-sized) cations; dimers and trimers of edge-sharing octahedra: 05 Nioboaeschynite-(Y), 05 Aeschynite-(Ce), 05 Aeschynite-(Nd), 05 Aeschynite-(Y), 05 Nioboaeschynite-(Ce), 05 Nioboaeschynite-(Nd), 05 Tantalaeschynite-(Y), 05 Rynersonite, 05 Vigezzite, 10 Changbaiite, 15 Murataite
  - 04.DG With large (± medium-sized) cations; chains of edge-sharing octahedra: 05 Euxenite-(Y), 05 Loranskite-(Y), 05 Polycrase-(Y), 05 Uranopolycrase, 05 Fersmite, 05 Kobeite-(Y), 05 Tanteuxenite-(Y), 05 Yttrocrasite-(Y); 10 Fergusonite-beta-(Nd), 10 Fergusonite-beta-(Y), 10 Fergusonite-beta-(Ce), 10 Yttrotantalite-(Y); 15 Foordite, 15 Thoreaulite; 20 Raspite
  - 04.DH With large (± medium-sized) cations; sheets of edge-sharing octahedra:
    - IMA/CNMNC revised the Pyrochlore supergroup 2010 (04.DH.15 and 04.DH.20)
    - 05 Brannerite, 05 Orthobrannerite, 05 Thorutite; 10 Kassite, 10 Lucasite-(Ce)
    - Pyrochlore group: Fluorcalciopyrochlore, Fluorkenopyrochlore, Fluornatropyrochlore, Fluorstrontiopyrochlore, Hydropyrochlore, Hydroxycalciopyrochlore, Kenoplumbopyrochlore, Oxycalciopyrochlore, Oxynatropyrochlore, Oxyplumbopyrochlore, Oxyyttropyrochlore-(Y)
    - Microlite group: Fluorcalciomicrolite, Fluornatromicrolite, Hydrokenomicrolite, Hydromicrolite, Hydroxykenomicrolite, Kenoplumbomicrolite, Oxycalciomicrolite, Oxystannomicrolite, Oxystibiomicrolite
    - Romeite group: Cuproromeite, Fluorcalcioromeite, Fluornatroromeite, Hydroxycalcioromeite, Oxycalcioromeite, Oxyplumboromeite, Stibiconite
    - Betafite group: Calciobetafite, Oxyuranobetafite
    - Elsmoreite group: Hydrokenoelsmoreite
    - 25 Rosiaite; 30 Zirconolite-3O, 30 Zirconolite-3T, 30 Zirconolite-2M, 30 Zirconolite; 35 Liandratite, 35 Petscheckite; 40 Ingersonite, 45 Pittongite
    - Discredited minerals 04.DH.15: Bariomicrolite (of Hogarth 1977), Bariopyrochlore (of Hogarth 1977), Betafite (of Hogarth 1977), Bismutomicrolite (of Hogarth 1977), Ceriopyrochlore (of Hogarth 1977), Jixianite, Natrobistantite, Plumbomicrolite (of Hogarth 1977), Plumbobetafite (of Hogarth 1977), Stannomicrolite (of Hogarth 1977), Stibiobetafite (of Černý et al.), Yttrobetafite (of Hogarth 1977), Yttropyrochlore (of Hogarth 1977), Bismutopyrochlore (of Chukanov et al.) and Bismutostibiconite 04.DH.20
  - 04.DJ With large (± medium-sized) cations; polyhedral frameworks: 05 Calciotantite, 05 Irtyshite, 05 Natrotantite
  - 04.DK With large (± medium-sized) cations; tunnel structures: 05 Ankangite, 05 Coronadite, 05 Hollandite, 05 Manjiroite, 05 Mannardite, 05 Redledgeite, 05 Priderite, 05 Henrymeyerite, 05 Akaganeite, 10 Cryptomelane, 10 Romanechite, 10 Strontiomelane, 10 Todorokite
  - 04.DL With large (± medium-sized) cations; fluorite-type structures: 05 Cerianite-(Ce), 05 Zirkelite, 05 Thorianite, 05 Uraninite; 10 Calzirtite, 10 Hiarneite, 10 Tazheranite
  - 04.DM With large (± medium-sized) cations; unclassified: 05 Sosedkoite, 05 Rankamaite; 15 Cesplumtantite, 20 Eyselite, 25 Kuranakhite
- 04.E Metal:Oxygen = < 1:2
  - 04.E: IMA2008-040
  - 04.EA Oxides with metal : oxygen < 1:2 (M_{2}O_{5}, MO_{3}): 05 Tantite, 10 Krasnogorite*, 10 Molybdite
- 04.X Unclassified Strunz Oxides
  - 04.XX Unknown: 00 Allendeite, 00 Ashanite?, 00 Hongquiite*, 00 Psilomelane?, 00 Uhligite?, 00 Clinobirnessite*, 00 Kleberite*, 00 Chubutite*, 00 Struverite?, 00 IMA2000-016, 00 IMA2000-026

=== Class: hydroxides ===
- 04.F Hydroxides (without V or U)
  - 04.FA Hydroxides with OH, without H_{2}O; corner-sharing tetrahedra: 05a Behoite, 05b Clinobehoite; 10 Sweetite, 10 Wulfingite, 10 Ashoverite
  - 04.FB Hydroxides with OH, without H_{2}O; insular octahedra: 05 Shakhovite; 10 Cualstibite, 10 Zincalstibite
  - 04.FC Hydroxides with OH, without H_{2}O; corner-sharing octahedra: 05 Dzhalindite, 05 Sohngeite, 05 Bernalite; 10 Burtite, 10 Mushistonite, 10 Natanite, 10 Vismirnovite, 10 Schoenfliesite, 10 Wickmanite; 15 Jeanbandyite, 15 Mopungite, 15 Stottite; 15 Tetrawickmanite; 20 Ferronigerite-6N6S, 20 Ferronigerite-2N1S, 20 Magnesionigerite-6N6S, 20 Magnesionigerite-2N1S; 25 Magnesiotaaffeite-6N3S, 25 Magnesiotaaffeite-2N2S, 25 Ferrotaaffeite-6N3S
  - 04.FD Hydroxides with OH, without H_{2}O; chains of edge-sharing octahedra: 05 Spertiniite; 10 Bracewellite, 10 Diaspore, 10 Guyanaite, 10 Groutite, 10 Goethite, 10 Montroseite, 10 Tsumgallite; 15 Manganitev; 20 Cerotungstite-(Ce), 20 Yttrotungstite-(Y), 20 Yttrotungstite-(Ce); 25 Frankhawthorneite; 30 Khinite, 30 Parakhinite
  - 04.FE Hydroxides with OH, without H_{2}O; sheets of edge-sharing octahedra: 05 Amakinite, 05 Brucite, 05 Portlandite, 05 Pyrochroite, 05 Theophrastite, 05 Fougerite; 10 Bayerite, 10 Doyleite, 10 Gibbsite, 10 Nordstrandite; 15 Boehmite, 15 Lepidocrocite; 20 Grimaldiite, 20 Heterogenite-2H, 20 Heterogenite-3R; 25 Feitknechtite, 25 Lithiophorite; 30 Quenselite, 35 Ferrihydrite; 40 Feroxyhyte, 40 Vernadite; 45 Quetzalcoatlite
  - 04.FF Hydroxides with OH, without H_{2}O; various polyhedra: 05 Hydroromarchite
  - 04.FG Hydroxides with OH, without H_{2}O; unclassified: 05 Janggunite, 10 Cesarolite, 15 Kimrobinsonite
  - 04.FH Hydroxides with H_{2}O ± (OH); insular octahedra: 05 Bottinoite, 05 Brandholzite
  - 04.FJ Hydroxides with H_{2}O ± (OH); corner-sharing octahedra: 05 Sidwillite, 05 Meymacite; 10 Tungstite; 15 Ilsemannite, 15 Hydrotungstite; 20 Parabariomicrolite
  - 04.FK Hydroxides with H_{2}O ± (OH); chains of edge-sharing octahedra: 05 Bamfordite
  - 04.FL Hydroxides with H_{2}O ± (OH); sheets of edge-sharing octahedra: 05 Meixnerite, 05 Jamborite, 05 Iowaite, 05 Woodallite, 05 Akdalaite, 05 Muskoxite; 10 Hydrocalumite, 15 Kuzelite; 20 Aurorite, 20 Chalcophanite, 20 Ernienickelite, 20 Jianshuiite; 25 Woodruffite, 30 Asbolane; 40 Takanelite, 40 Rancieite; 45 Birnessite, 55 Cianciulliite, 60 Jensenite, 65 Leisingite, 75 Cafetite, 80 Mourite, 85 Deloryite
  - 04.FM Hydroxides with H_{2}O ± (OH); Unclassified: 15 Franconite, 15 Hochelagaite, 15 Ternovite; 25 Belyankinite, 25 Gerasimovskite, 25 Manganbelyankinite; 30 Silhydrite, 35 Cuzticite, 40 Cyanophyllite
  - 04.FN: 05 Menezesite
- 04.G Uranyl Hydroxides
  - 04.GA Without additional cations: IMA2008-022; 05 Metaschoepite, 05 Paraschoepite, 05 Schoepite; 10 Ianthinite; 15 Metastudtite, 15 Studtite
  - 04.GB With additional cations (K, Ca, Ba, Pb, etc.); with mainly UO_{2}(O,OH)_{5} pentagonal polyhedra: 05 Compreignacite, 05 Agrinierite, 05 Rameauite; 10 Billietite, 10 Becquerelite, 10 Protasite; 15 Richetite; 20 Calciouranoite, 20 Bauranoite, 20 Metacalciouranoite; 25 Fourmarierite, 30 Wolsendorfite, 35 Masuyite; 40 Metavandendriesscheite, 40 Vandendriesscheite; 45 Vandenbrandeite, 50 Sayrite, 55 Curite, 60 Iriginite, 65 Uranosphaerite, 70 Holfertite
  - 04.GC With additional cations; with UO_{2}(O,OH)_{6} hexagonal polyhedra: 05 Clarkeite, 10 Umohoite, 15 Spriggite
- 04.H V^{[5,6]} Vanadates
  - (moved to -08- Class: vanadates)
- 04.I Ice group
- 04.X Unclassified Strunz Oxides (Hydroxides)
  - 04.XX Unknown: 00 Ungursaite*, 00 Scheteligite?
