= Cleusonite =

Mineral

General
- Category: Oxide minerals
- Formula: (Pb,Sr)(U^{4+},U^{6+})(Fe^{2+},Zn)_{2}(Ti,Fe^{2+},Fe^{3+})_{18}(O,OH)_{38}
- IMA symbol: Ceu
- Strunz classification: 4.CC.40
- Crystal system: Trigonal
- Crystal class: Rhombohedral (3̅); H-M symbol: (3̅)
- Space group: R3̅
- Unit cell: a = 10.385(2) Å, c = 20.900(7) Å; Z = 3

Identification
- Color: Black
- Crystal habit: Multiple rhombohedra and hexagonal prisms, metamict
- Twinning: fine twinning
- Cleavage: None
- Fracture: Conchoidal
- Tenacity: Brittle
- Mohs scale hardness: 6-7
- Luster: Sub metallic
- Streak: Black
- Diaphaneity: Opaque
- Specific gravity: 4.74 (synthetic), ~5.15 (calculated)
- Other characteristics: Radioactive

Cleusonite is a member of the crichtonite group of minerals with the chemical formula (Pb,Sr)(U^{4+},U^{6+})(Fe^{2+},Zn)_{2}(Ti,Fe^{2+},Fe^{3+})_{18}(O,OH)_{38}. This group of minerals contains approximately thirteen complex metal titanates. The structures of minerals of this group is complicated by frequent fine-scale twinning and metamictization due to radioactive elements. The crichtonite group consists of members of related mineral species of the type A{BC_{2}D_{6}E_{12}}O_{38} which are characterized by their predominant cations (as seen in crichtonite (Sr), senaite (Pb), davidite (REE + U), landauite (Na), loveringite (Ca), lindsleyite (Ba), and mathiasite (K).

== Composition ==
The chemical formula of cleusonite is (Pb,Sr)(U^{4+},U^{6+})(Fe^{2+},Zn)_{2}(Ti,Fe^{2+},Fe^{3+})_{18}(O,OH)_{38}. The following minerals are also found in the veins of cleusonite; quartz, chlorite, calcite, albite, microcline, tourmaline, fluorapatite, zircon, ilmenite, hematite, titanite, pyrite, chalcopyrite, tennantite, rutile, crichtonite, monazite-(Ce), and native gold.

Clausthalite, chalcopyrite, and uraninite are also found in the form of inclusions in cleusonite.

== Structure ==
The structure of the lead end-member senaite of the crichtonite group was determined in 1976 by Grey & Lloyd. The structure of the other members of the crichtonite group is similar and corresponds to the formula AM_{21}O_{38}.

The crystals of cleusonite consist of multiple rhombohedra and hexagonal prisms that are twinned. The crystal system is a trigonal - rhombohedral class 3 and has space group of R3̅.

== Physical properties ==
Cleusonite is seen as a black opaque cm-sized tabular crystal with a bright sub-metallic luster. It does not have any cleavage and has a density of about 4.74(4) g/cm3. The calculated density may vary from 5.02(6) (for untreated crystals) to 5.27(5) (heat-treated crystals); the variations are caused by the cell swelling due to the metamictization.

Cleusonite crystals are usually metamict black semimetallic prismatic and associated with quartz.

== Geological occurrence characteristics ==
It was found at two occurrences in greenschist facies metamorphosed gneissic series of the Mont Fort and Siviez-Mischabel Nappes in Valais, Switzerland (Cleuson and Bella Tolla summit), and named after the type locality. Cleusonite is found first in metamorphic rocks of the central Swiss Alps with the type locality being Oligocene-Miocene alpine cleft veins near Cleuson, Val de Nendaz, Valais and secondly in gneisses and crosscutting alpine veins near the Bella Tolla summit, also in Valais. In the Bella Tolla summit it is found in the form of hematite-stained flattened aggregates with quartz, albite, baryte, chalcopyrite, uraninite, tennantite, pyrite, magnetite, cinnabar, and malachite. The name cleusonite is used for the previously described “uranium-rich senaite” from Alinci, North Macedonia and the "plumbodavidite" from Huanglongpu, China. Cleusonite is radioactive.
