= Bismutotantalite =

Bismuth tantalum oxide mineral

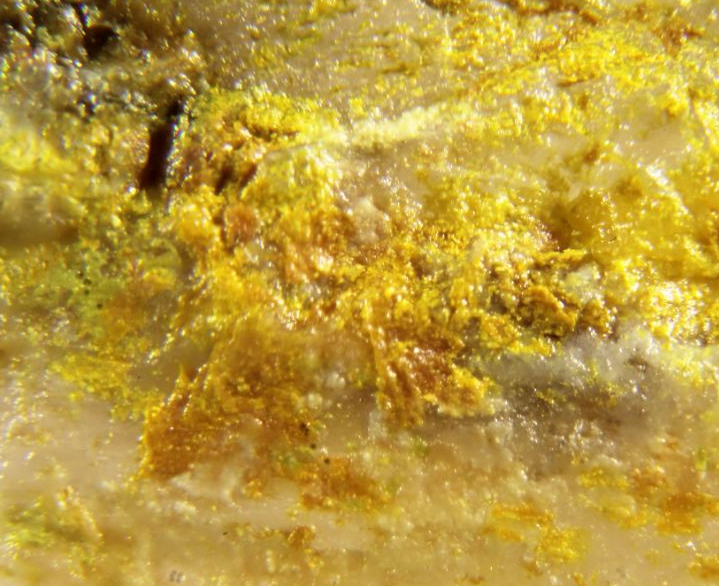
- Yellow crystal aggregates of bismutotantalite found in New Mexico

General
- Category: Oxide mineral
- Formula: Bi(Ta,Nb)O_{4}
- IMA symbol: Bttl
- Strunz classification: 4.DE.30
- Crystal system: Orthorhombic
- Crystal class: Dipyramidal (mmm); H-M symbol: (2/m 2/m 2/m)
- Space group: Pcmn (or Pcn2_{1})
- Unit cell: a = 4.97 to 5.00 Å, b = 11.80 to 11.89 Å, c = 5.66 to 5.69 Å; Z = 4

Identification
- Color: Pale brown to pitch-black; pale smoke-gray to colorless in thin fragments
- Crystal habit: Stout prismatic crystals elongated along [001], to 10 cm, commonly irregular or misshapen
- Cleavage: Good on {010}; distinct on {101} and {100}
- Fracture: Subconchoidal
- Mohs scale hardness: 5 to 5.5
- Luster: Adamantine to submetallic
- Streak: Yellow, yellow-brown to black
- Diaphaneity: Opaque; transparent in very thin fragments
- Specific gravity: 8.15 to 8.89 (measured)
- Optical properties: Biaxial crystal (+); isotropic when metamict
- Refractive index: n_{α} = 2.388 to 2.395, n_{β} = 2.403 to 2.408, n_{γ} = 2.426 to 2.428
- 2V angle: ~80° (measured)
- Dispersion: r < v

Bismutotantalite is a rare oxide mineral made up mainly of bismuth, tantalum, and oxygen. It is notable among oxide minerals for its very high density and refractive index. Its ideal chemical formula is BiTaO_{4}, though the more general formula Bi(Ta,Nb)O_{4} reflects the fact that niobium can substitute for some of the tantalum in its structure.

Bismutotantalite belongs to a small family of related minerals known as the stibiotantalite group, all of which share the general chemical pattern ABO_{4}. Because chemically similar elements can swap places within this structure, bismutotantalite forms a solid solution series with bismutocolumbite (BiNbO_{4}) as niobium substitutes for tantalum, and is related in the same way, through substitution of antimony (Sb) for bismuth, to stibiotantalite (SbTaO_{4}).

== Description ==
Bismutotantalite is identified by its crystal form together with a set of physical and optical properties, several of which are extreme among oxide minerals. Bismutotantalite crystallizes in the orthorhombic system and may become metamict, meaning its crystal structure is progressively broken down by radiation, owing to radiation damage from minor uranium. Crystals are stout and prismatic, elongated along the c axis, and reach about 10 cm in length, though they are commonly irregular or misshapen; masses weighing several pounds have been recorded from Uganda. The mineral has a hardness of 5 to 5.5 and a subconchoidal fracture, with good cleavage on certain planes.

Its color ranges from pale brown to pitch-black, appearing smoke-gray to colorless only in very thin fragments, and its streak is yellow to yellow-brown or black. The luster is adamantine to submetallic. A defining feature is the mineral's very high measured specific gravity, a measure of density relative to water, of 8.15 to 8.89, among the highest of the oxide minerals, together with extremely high refractive indices (greater than 2.38), which cause it to bend light very strongly. Optically it is biaxial positive, becoming isotropic where metamict.

Minerals rarely occur in chemically pure form, and the extent to which antimony can replace bismuth in bismutotantalite has been studied in detail. Structural studies have shown that the centrosymmetric structure of bismutotantalite can incorporate up to about 40% substitution of antimony for bismuth without transforming to the polar structure of stibiotantalite, with such antimony-rich material termed stibian bismutotantalite.

== Occurrence ==
Bismutotantalite forms in a specific geological setting and is found alongside a characteristic group of associated minerals. It is a rare accessory mineral of granite pegmatites, coarse-grained igneous rocks that commonly host large crystals and rare elements, where it is associated with minerals such as muscovite, schorl, and cassiterite, and also occurs as stream-rounded placer pebbles. At the type locality in Uganda it is found with muscovite, schorl, and cassiterite, while in Brazil it was originally recovered as rounded placer pebbles from stream beds.

Reported occurrences include the type locality on Gamba Hill near Kambala in southwestern Uganda, the Muiâne pegmatite of the Alto Ligonha district in Mozambique, and Analamisakana, Madagascar. The mineral has also been found in several localities in Rio Grande do Norte and Paraíba in northeastern Brazil, including Acari, Nagatare in Fukuoka Prefecture, Japan, the La Elvirita pegmatite in northwestern Argentina, elbaite pegmatites near Momeik in Shan State, Myanmar, and a locality in the Altai Mountains of Xinjiang, China.

== Discovery and naming ==
Bismutotantalite was first described in 1929 by the geologist Edward James Wayland and the mineralogist Leonard James Spencer, from material collected in Uganda, in a paper published in the Mineralogical Magazine. Its name alludes to its composition, containing bismuth, and to its relationship to tantalite. An occurrence in Bolivia was described by Friedrich Ahlfeld and another in Brazil was described by CorneliusHurlbut Jr. in 1957. Type material is preserved at the Natural History Museum, London, and at the National Museum of Natural History in Washington, D.C.
