= Aeschynite =

Aeschynite may refer to:

- Aeschynite-(Ce)
- Aeschynite-(Nd)
- Aeschynite-(Y)
