= Ramsdellite =

Oxide mineral

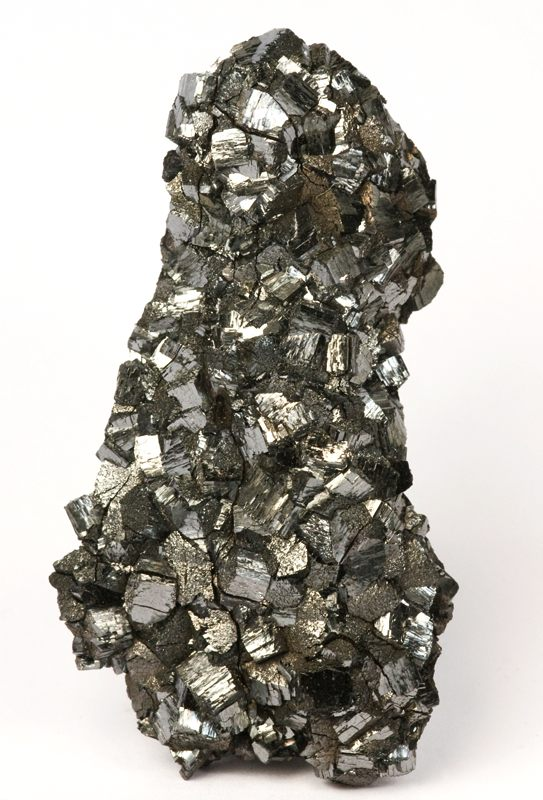
- Sample from Mistake Mine, Box Canyon District, Yavapai County, Arizona, USA

General
- Category: Oxide minerals
- Formula: MnO_{2}
- IMA symbol: Rmd
- Strunz classification: 04.DB.15a
- Dana classification: 04.04.07.01
- Crystal system: Orthorhombic
- Crystal class: Dipyramidal
- Space group: Pbnm (no. 62)

Identification
- Formula mass: 86.94 gm (Mn 63.19% O 36.81%)
- Color: Iron black, Black, Steel gray
- Crystal habit: Granular / Massive-Fibrous / Platy
- Cleavage: Good
- Fracture: Conchoidal to uneven
- Tenacity: Brittle
- Mohs scale hardness: 3 – Calcite
- Luster: Metallic
- Streak: Brownish black
- Diaphaneity: Opaque
- Specific gravity: 4.79 g/cm^{3} (calculated)
- Density: 4.37 g/cm^{3} (measured)
- Optical properties: NCalc= 2.89 (Dcalc) / 2.72 (Dmeas)

Ramsdellite (Mn^{4+}O_{2}) is an orthorhombic manganese dioxide mineral. It is relatively uncommon, and is usually found in deposits containing other manganese oxide crystals.

== Name ==
Ramsdellite is named after the American mineralogist, Lewis Stephen Ramsdell (1895–1975). Ramsdell spent almost all his career at the University of Michigan as a professional mineralogist. Ramsdellite was one of the new phases he first recognized in the "black manganese oxide" minerals. It was later named in his honour by Michael Fleischer and W. E. Richmond, who fully described the mineral in 1943. The mineral is also called Groutellite.

== Chemistry and crystallography ==
The chemical formula for Ramsdellite is MnO_{2}. The empirical formula is Mn^{4+}O_{2}. Ramsdellite has the same chemistry as the more common pyrolusite, but is orthorhombic where pyrolusite is tetragonal. Ramsdellite belongs to the Orthorhombic crystal system and Dipyramidal crystal class. Properties:

Crystal	System	Orthorhombic
Crystal	Point group	2/m 2/m 2/m
Crystal	Form	Often pseudomorphs of groutite crystals
Crystal	Crystal habit	Platy, fibrous or massive
Physical	Cleavage	Prominent, on three pinacoids and a prism
Physical	Tenacity	Brittle
Physical	Hardness (Mohs scale)	About 3
Physical	D	Measured = 4.65–4.83 Calculated = 4.84
Optical	Opaque	
Optical	Color	Steel-gray to iron-black; yellowish white in reflected light.
Optical	Streak	Black, may have brownish tint
Optical	Luster	Brilliant metallic.
Optical	Optical Class	Biaxial
Optical	Anisotropism	Strong; pale yellow
Optical	Bireflectance	Distinct.
Cell	Space group	Pbnm. a = 4.533(5) b = 9.27(1) c = 2.866(5) Z = 4

== Classification ==
The Dana classification is 4.4.7.1 (simple oxides: AX_{2}). The Hey's CIM Ref is 7.18.8 (Oxides and Hydroxides, Oxides of Mn). The Nickel–Strunz classification is 04.DB.15a, since the metal:oxygen ratio is around 1:2 and the mineral has medium-sized cations; chains of edge-sharing octahedra. Other elements in the Ramsdellite / 04.DB.15 group are Paramontroseite: V^{4+}O_{2} (15a), Akhtenskite: ε-Mn^{4+}O_{2} (15b) and Nsutite: (Mn^{4+},Mn^{2+})(O,OH)_{2} (15c).

== Distribution ==
Ramsdellite is formed by oxidization of weathered manganese minerals such as manganite, and is often found in deposits containing various other manganese oxides. The mineral is relatively rare. The type locality, the place where Ramsdellite was first identified, is the Lake Valley district in Sierra County, New Mexico, US. Other locations in the USA where well-characterized samples of Ramsdellite have been found are Artillery Mountains, Arizona; Mistake mine, Yavapai County, Arizona; Idarado mine, near Telluride, Colorado; and Monroe-Tener mine, near Chisholm, Minnesota.

Good samples have been found in Canada along the East River in Pictou County, Nova Scotia; in Mexico in Los Gavilanes, Baja California; In India in Dongari Buzurg, Bhandara, Maharashtra; in Australia in the Iron Monarch quarry, Iron Knob, South Australia; in Japan in the Otoshibetsu and Tanno mines, Hokkaido; in the Czech Republic at Horní Blatná; in Germany at Bütten-Adenstadt, Lower Saxony and Clara Mine, near Oberwolfach, Black Forest; in Egypt at Gebel To Yu, Yoider, and Um Bogna; and in South Africa at Hotazel, near Kuruman, Northern Cape. Ramsdellite is found in the manganese deposits near Moanda, Haut-Ogooué Province, Gabon, mined by the Compagnie minière de l'Ogooué. These deposits were formed by supergene enrichment of Precambrian sediments.

== Sources ==
- National Materials Advisory Board (1981), Manganese Reserves and Resources of the World and Their Industrial Implications: Report, National Academies, NAP:11507
- "Nickel-Strunz Oxides Classification", webmineral.com
- "Ramsdellite", mindat.org, Hudson Institute of Mineralogy
- "Ramsdellite Mineral Data", webmineral.com
- Ramsdellite (PDF), Mineral Data Publishing
- "The Mineral Ramsdellite", galleries.com
- Willett F. Ramsdell, The University of Michigan
