= Akhtenskite =

Manganese oxide mineral

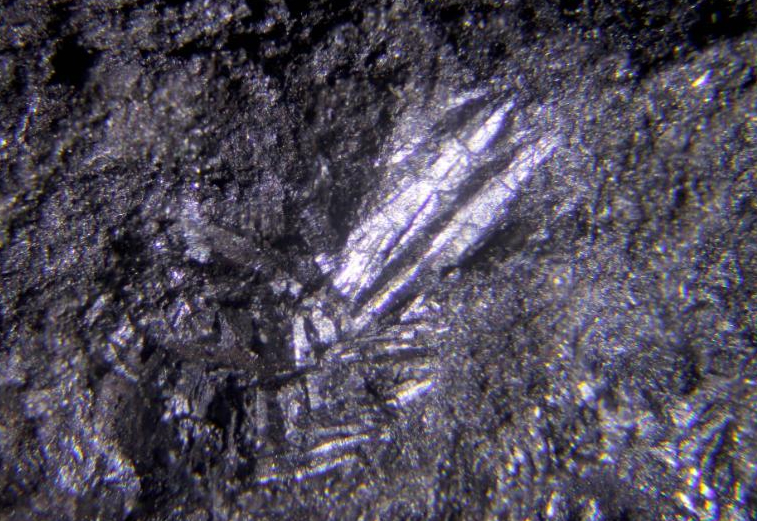

General
- Category: Oxide mineral
- Formula: MnO_{2}
- IMA symbol: Akh
- Strunz classification: 4.DB.15b
- Crystal system: Hexagonal; Dihexagonal dipyramidal class
- Space group: Hexagonal; H-M symbol: (6/m 2/m 2/m); Space group: P6_{3}/mmc
- Unit cell: a = 2.84, c = 4.6 [Å]; Z = 1

Identification
- Color: Light gray to black
- Crystal habit: Flaky polycrystalline aggregates
- Cleavage: Distinct on {001}
- Streak: Black
- Diaphaneity: Opaque
- Specific gravity: 4.78 (calculated)
- Optical properties: Uniaxial

Akhtenskite is a manganese oxide mineral with the chemical formula of MnO_{2} (or: ε-Mn^{4+}O_{2}) that was named after the Akhtensk deposit in Russia, where it was first discovered and noted in 1979. It can be found in the Akhtensk brown ironstone deposit, in the southern Ural Mountains, on Mt. Zarod, on the Sikhote-Alin Mountains, and in the Primorskiy Krai, all in Russia.

Its crystals are usually hexagonal in shape, with flakiness and plating, usually because it replaced a mineral. Akhtenskite is a polymorphous with the much more widespread pyrolusite. It occurs in mixtures with "psilomelane" (recently renamed to romanechite) and with other manganese oxides in an iron oxide deposit, most likely bacterially altered from a previous mineral in the Akhtensk deposit. It also occurs in crusts of ferromanganese minerals on oceanic rocks. Its chemical makeup is 63% oxygen and 37% manganese.

Some minerals that are commonly associated with akhtenskite are: todorokite, pyrolusite, nsutite, goethite, and cryptomelane.
