= Vigezzite =

Mineral

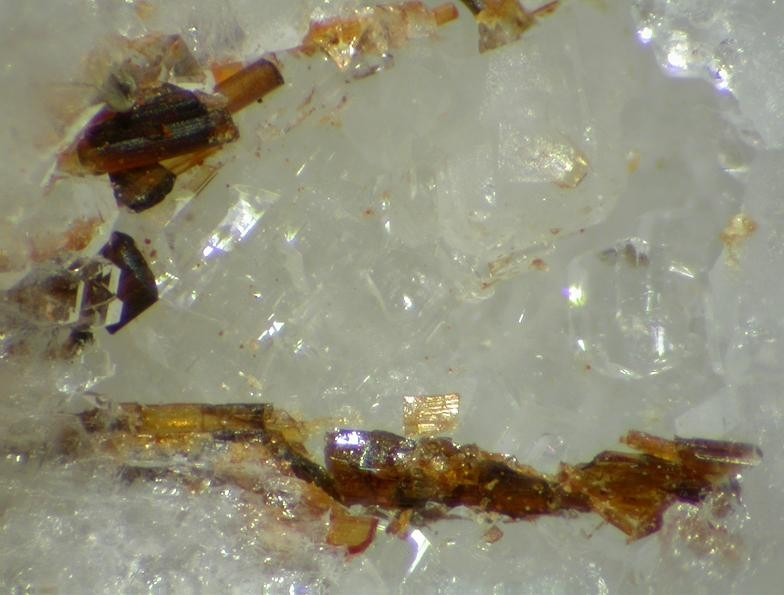

General
- Category: Oxide mineral
- Formula: (Ca,Ce),(Nb,Ta,Ti)_{2}O_{6}
- IMA symbol: Vgz
- Crystal system: Orthorhombic
- Crystal class: Dipyramidal (same H-M symbol)
- Space group: Pnmb
- Unit cell: a = 11.065 Å, b = 7.527 Å c = 5.343 Å; α=90.00° β=90.00°, γ=90.00°; Z=4

Identification
- Color: Orange-yellow
- Crystal habit: Flat Prismatic crystals
- Cleavage: Along {100}
- Fracture: conchoidal
- Mohs scale hardness: 4.5-5
- Luster: Sub Metallic
- Diaphaneity: Subtranslucent to Opaque
- Density: 5.54 g/cm^{3}
- Optical properties: biaxial positive
- Refractive index: n_{α}= 2.140 n_{γ}= 2.315
- Birefringence: δ=0.175
- Dispersion: extreme

Vigezzite is a variant of the mineral aeschynite containing calcium, cerium, niobium, tantalum, and titanium. It was first discovered near Orcesco, Valle Vigezzo, Provo Novara, Northern Italy, in cavities of an albitic rock. The crystals of Vigezzite are flat prismatic crystals up to 2-3 mm length of an orange-yellow color.The name Vigezzite was chosen to draw attention to the locality that has produced the first occurrence of a Ca-Nb-Ta-mineral with Nb dominance over Ta, crystallizing with the aeschynite structure. The ideal chemical formula for vigezzite is (Ca,Ce),(Nb,Ta,Ti)_{2}O_{6}

== Occurrence ==
Vigezzite is found in association with albitic rock in miarolitic cavities. Albitic rock is rock which contains the mineral albite and is closely associated with feldspars. When found with these minerals, the vigezzite crystals are implanted on the surface of the other minerals and rock. It occurs in pegmatite dikes that contain potassium feldspar converted to sodic feldspar by an albitization process. This dike formation is a direct relation to the metamorphism that occurs in the area and is the reason for the formation of vigezzite.

== Physical properties ==
Vigezzite is an orange-yellow colored transparent mineral forming thin brittle crystals with a sub metallic luster. It exhibits a hardness of 4.5-5 on the Mohs hardness scale. Vigezzite forms long prismatic crystals up to 2-3 mm in length, elongated along their a-axis and flattened on (010). The crystals are strongly striated on (010) parallel to prism axis. The prisms are terminated by the pinacoids (100) only. The measured density is 5.54. g/cm^{3}.

== Optical properties ==
Vigezzite is biaxial positive, which means it will refract light differently along two axes. It exhibits an extreme dispersion, and displays no pleochroism.

== Chemical properties ==
The empirical chemical formula for vigezzite is (Ca_{0.82},Ce_{0.24})_{Σ1.06}(Nb_{0.9},Ta_{0.62},Ti_{0.5})_{Σ2.02}O_{6},.

== Chemical composition ==
Oxide	wt%
CaO	12.0
Ce_{2}O_{3}	10.5
TiO_{2}	10.5
Nb_{2}O_{5}	31.0
Ta_{2}O_{5}	36.0
Total	100.0

== X-ray crystallography ==
Vigezzite is in the orthorhombic crystal system, with space group Pnmb. The unit cell dimensions are a=7.55 Å, b=11.03 Å, c=5.36 Å, α=90.00°, β=90.00°, γ=90.00°. Because the mineral occurs in small but well-shaped single crystals, X-ray photographs are of excellent quality. For vigezzite, the morphological prism axis parallels the crystallographic a-axis.

== See also ==
- List of minerals
