= Uranopolycrase =

Euxenite-group oxide mineral

General
- Category: Oxide
- Formula: (U,Y)(Ti,Nb)_{2}O_{6}
- IMA symbol: Uplc
- Crystal system: Orthorhombic
- Crystal class: 2/m 2/m 2/m
- Space group: Pbcn
- Unit cell: a = 14.51(1) Å, b = 5.558(5) Å c = 5.173(4) Å

Identification
- Color: Brown-red
- Crystal habit: Tabular {100} and elongated parallel to [001], observed forms {100}, {010}, and {011}
- Cleavage: Good on {100}
- Luster: Adamantine
- Streak: Brownish
- Pleochroism: None
- Other characteristics: Radioactive

Uranopolycrase is an oxide mineral first discovered in the Fonte del Prete vein of a pegmatite vein in San Piero in Campo, Elba Island, Tuscany, Italy. Uranopolycrase is a member of the Euxenite Group and is the uranium bearing analog of polycrase-(Y). The type specimen is almost entirely metamict. The ideal formula for uranopolycrase is (U,Y)(Ti,Nb)_{2}O_{6}. The mineral has been approved by the Commission on New Minerals and Mineral Names of the International Mineralogical Association to be named uranopolycrase for its similarity to polycrase-(Y) and was approved 5 December, 1991.

== Occurrence ==
The type specimen of uranopolycrase was found in the Fonte del Prete pegmatite vein in San Piero in Campo, Elba Island, Tuscany, Italy. The Fonte del Prete vein is known for its niobium and Tantalum (Nb Ta) bearing minerals. Uranopolycrase is higher in niobium than tantalum, as are all of the polycrase and euxenite minerals in the vein. Uranopolycrase is characteristic of small pockets that are irregularly distributed at the termination of the dike. These pockets also contain polychrome tourmaline, colorless beryl, lithium-dominant minerals, mangano-columbite, uranium and bismuth-rich polycrase-(Y), microlite, wodginite, and occasionally manganotantalite.

== Physical properties ==
Uranopolycrase crystals are brown-red and appear pale-grey with bluish tones in reflected light. The crystals are opaque and exhibit an adamantine luster. The crystals are tabular {100} and elongated parallel to [001], with observed forms of {100}, {010}, and {011}. Uranopolycrase shows good cleavage along {100}. The streak color is brownish. The microhardness is VHN_{20} = 659.

== Optical properties ==
The observations made of the optical properties of uranopolycrase were made using unheated, metamict mineral. In reflected light the color is pale grey with bluish tones. Weak dark-brown to red internal reflections can be seen on the rims of the crystal fragments. Uranopolycrase does not exhibit pleochroism, anisotropism, or bireflectance.

== Chemical properties ==
Uranopolycrase is an oxide with a high oxygen to cation ratio. energy-dispersive X-ray spectroscopy (EDAX) analysis showed that uranopolycrase is relatively homogeneous with uranium almost always being dominant over yttrium. The calculated formula is (U_{0.62}Y_{0.29}Mn_{0.03}Ca_{0.02}Nb_{0.01})(Ti_{1.46}Nb_{0.36}Ta_{0.12})O_{6} with an ideal formula of (U,Y)(Ti,Nb)_{2}O_{6}.

== Chemical composition ==
| Oxide | wt% |
|---|---|
| UO_{2} | 39.08 |
| TiO_{2} | 27.36 |
| ThO_{2} | 4.14 |
| Nb_{2}O_{5} | 11.27 |
| Ta_{2}O_{5} | 5.98 |
| Y_{2}O_{3} | 7.78 |
| Nd_{2}O_{3} | 0.37 |
| MnO | 0.48 |
| CaO | 0.22 |
| Total | 96.73 |

The low total is inferred to be the result of post-metamictization hydration.

== X-ray crystallography ==
The type specimen is almost entirely metamict due to the high content of radioactive elements.The mineral was sliced into fragments that were heated to 900°C for 10 hours prior to X-ray diffraction analysis. Uranopolycrase is in the orthorhombic crystal system and is isostructural with other AB_{2}O_{6} compounds such as fersmite and columbite. Uranopolycrase is morphologically identical to polycrase-(Y). The mineral is in Pbcn space group and the 2/m 2/m 2/m point group. The unit cell parameters are a = 14.51(1) Å, b = 5.558(5) Å, and c = 5.173(4) Å. Elements within the mineral are arranged in layers of A- and B-type polyhedra. Cation coordination distances in A-type polyhedra vary depending on whether the cation is a U, Y, or Ca. Coordination distances are longest when coordinated with U and shortest when coordinated with Ca. The B-type polyhedra are octahedral with titanium and niobium cations typically present in the octahedral site, and are sometimes distorted.

== See also ==
List of Minerals
