= Zirkelite =

Oxide mineral

General
- Category: Oxide mineral
- Formula: (Ti,Ca,Zr)O_{(2−x)}
- IMA symbol: Zke
- Strunz classification: 4.DL.05
- Crystal system: Isometric
- Crystal class: Hexoctahedral (m3̅m); H-M symbol: (4/m 3̅ 2/m)
- Unit cell: a = 5.02 Å, Z = 4

Identification
- Color: Black, reddish brown
- Crystal habit: Crystalline, metamict, pseudocubic
- Cleavage: None
- Fracture: Brittle
- Luster: Resinous
- Streak: Brownish grey
- Diaphaneity: Subtranslucent to opaque
- Density: 4.7
- Other characteristics: Radioactive

Zirkelite is an oxide mineral with the chemical formula (Ca,Th,Ce)Zr(Ti,Nb)_{2}O_{7}. It occurs as well-formed fine sized isometric crystals. It is a black, brown or yellow mineral with a hardness of 5.5 and a specific gravity of 4.7.

== Name and discovery ==
Zirkelite was first discovered in Brazil in 1895. It was named for German petrographer Ferdinand Zirkel (1838–1912).

== Occurrence ==
Initial discovery was from the Jacupiranga carbonatite, São Paulo, Brazil. It is also found in Canada, Kazakhstan, Norway, Russia, South Africa, the United Kingdom, and the United States.

== See also ==
- List of minerals named after people
