= Biehlite =

Mineral

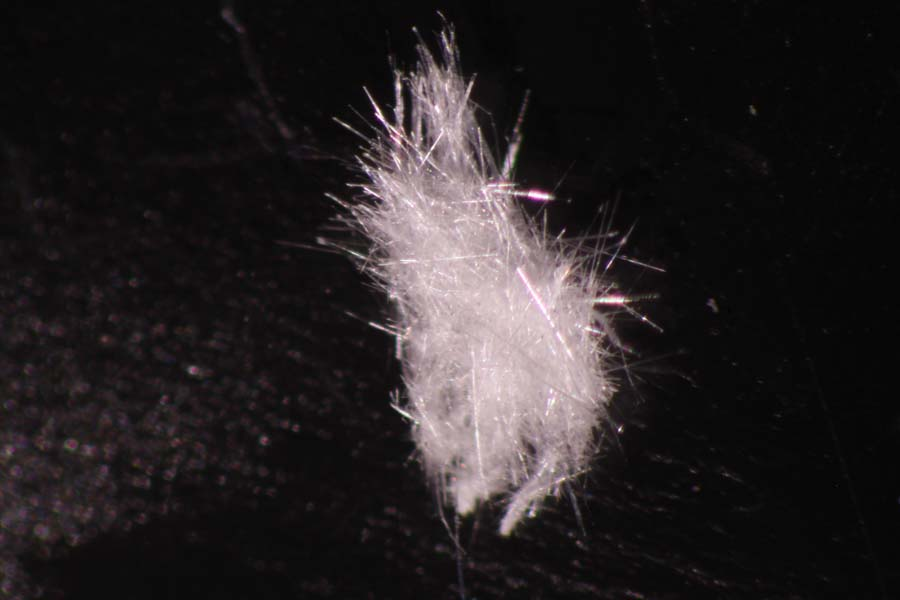
- Biehlite, from Tsumeb, Namibia

General
- Category: Oxide minerals
- Formula: [(Sb,As)O]_{2}MoO_{4}
- IMA symbol: Bhl
- Strunz classification: 4.DB.60
- Crystal system: Monoclinic
- Crystal class: Prismatic (2/m) (same H-M symbol)
- Space group: C2/c

Identification
- Color: white
- Luster: vitreous, silky
- Streak: white

Biehlite is an exceptionally rare mineral, an antimony arsenic bearing molybdate with formula [(Sb,As)O]_{2}MoO_{4}. It comes from Tsumeb.
