= Zincochromite =

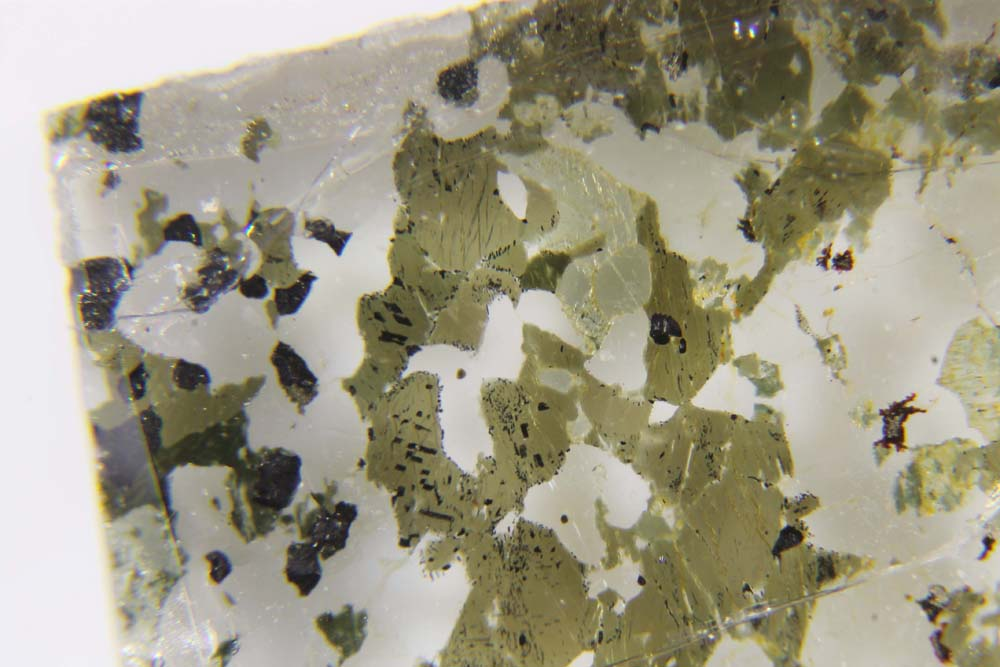
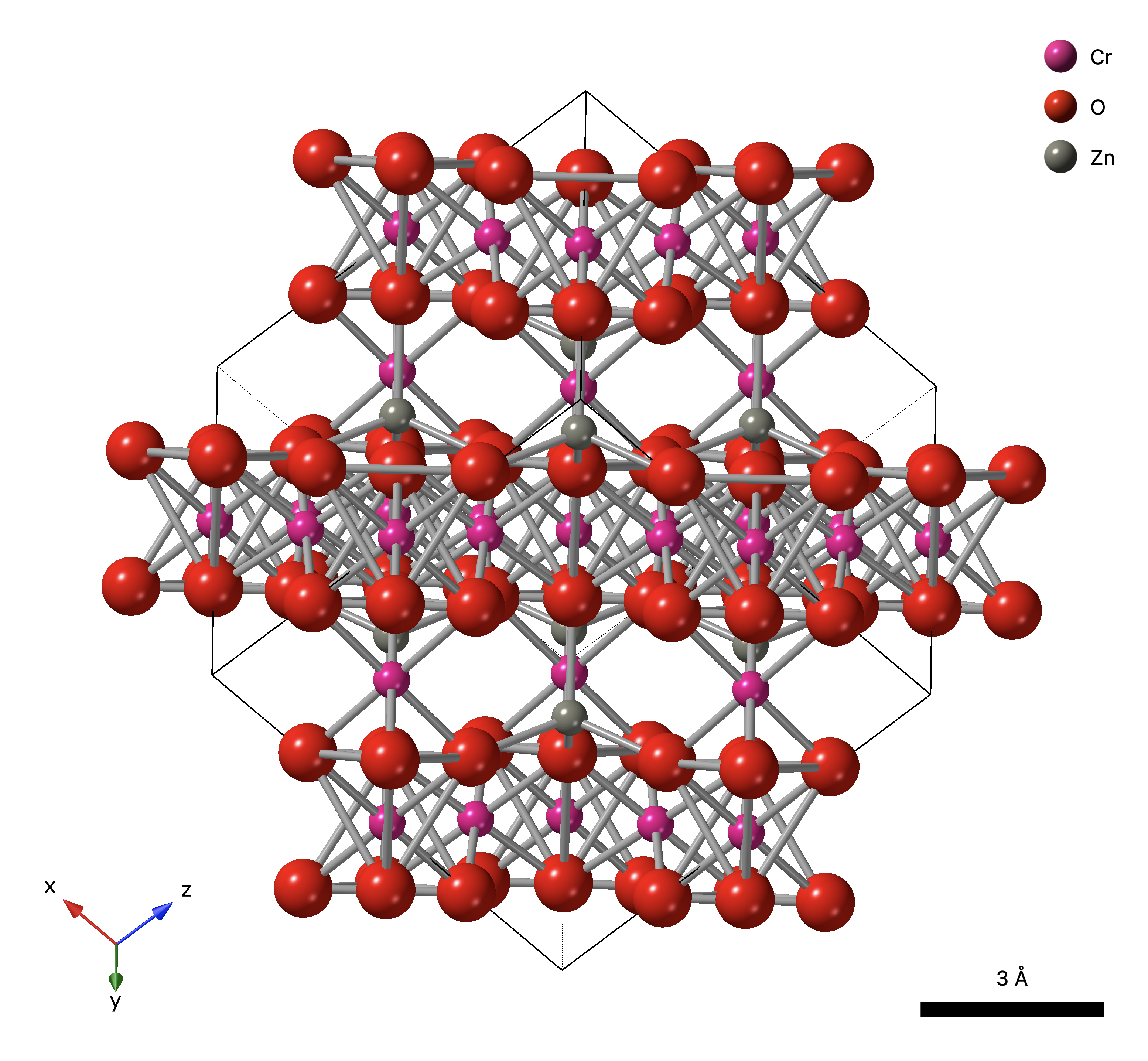
- Top: Zincochromite from Russia. Bottom: ZnCr_{2}O_{4} (Fd3̅m) crystal structure showing Zn on tetrahedral A sites (gray), Cr on octahedral B sites (magenta), and O (red).

General
- Category: Minerals
- Formula: ZnCr_{2}O_{4}
- IMA symbol: Zchr
- Strunz classification: 4.BB.05
- Crystal system: Cubic
- Crystal class: Hexoctahedral (m3̅m); H-M symbol: (4/m 3̅ 2/m)
- Space group: Fd3̅m
- Unit cell: a = 8.32 Å; Z = 8

Identification
- Color: Brownish black
- Crystal habit: Zoned euhedral crystals with hexagonal outline
- Mohs scale hardness: 5.8
- Luster: Semimetallic
- Streak: Brown
- Diaphaneity: Opaque, translucent in thin slivers
- Optical properties: Isotropic
- Other characteristics: Weakly paramagnetic

Zincochromite is a zinc chromium oxide mineral with the formula ZnCr_{2}O_{4}. It is the zinc analogue of chromite, hence the name. It was first described in 1987 as an occurrence in a uranium deposit near Lake Onega, Russia. It has also been reported from Dolo Hill, New South Wales, Australia, and from the Tarkwa Mine in the Ashanti gold belt of Ghana.
