= Changbaiite =

Mineral

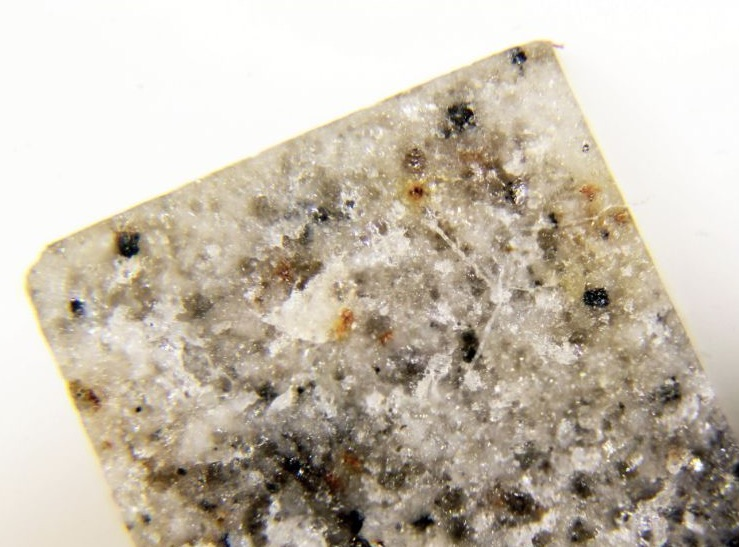

General
- Category: Oxide minerals
- Formula: PbNb_{2}O_{6}
- Strunz classification: 4.DF.10
- Crystal system: Trigonal
- Crystal class: Ditrigonal pyramidal (3m) (same H-M symbol)
- Space group: R3m

Identification
- Formula mass: 489.01 gram/mol
- Color: Colorless, Cream white, Pale brown, Yellow brown, Pale yellow green
- Crystal habit: Tabular - Form dimensions are thin in one direction.
- Cleavage: {0001} Perfect, {1011} Distinct
- Mohs scale hardness: 5.5
- Luster: Adamantine - Pearly
- Streak: white
- Diaphaneity: Transparent
- Optical properties: Uniaxial (+), w=2.476, e=2.485, bire=0.0090.
- Ultraviolet fluorescence: Non-fluorescent

Changbaiite (PbNb_{2}O_{6}) is a member of the oxide mineral class in which the mineral contains oxygen which is grouped along with one or two metal ion. Changbaiite is classified as a multiple Oxide XY_{2}O_{6} and it generally has an ionic bond. Furthermore, it is also orthorhombic at a temperature of 25 °C and it changes to orthorhombic-tetragonal at 570 °C.

== Composition ==
The chemical formula of changbaiite is PbNb_{2}O_{6} after microprobe analysis of kaolinite-filled veins. It is composed of iron (II) oxide FeO 0.94%, lead oxide PbO 41.51%, iron (III) oxide Fe_{2}O_{3} 0.42%, titanium dioxide TiO_{2} 0.95%, niobium pentoxide Nb_{2}O_{5} 55.62%, and tantalum pentoxide Ta_{2}O_{5} 0.98%, which produce the chemical formula (Pb_{0.95}Fe_{2+0.05})(Nb_{1.95}Ti_{0.05}Fe_{3+0.02}Ta_{0.01}) or PbNb_{2}O_{6}. It was also examined by the spectrographic method which represents Sb 0.3, Si 0.1, Ba 0.2, Ca 0.1, and minor traces of copper, magnesium and aluminum.

Subbarao suggested that Changbaiite formula PbNb_{2}O_{6} can vary. He represented lead niobate by A1+xNb2O6 where the A site is an ion (usually lead) and he found that the upper limit of x in his representation was about 0.15 and a low limit between −0.07 and −0.08. In conclusion, the formula ranges from Pb_{0.92}Nb_{2}O_{6} to Pb_{1.15}Nb_{2}O_{6}.

== Geological occurrence ==
Changbaiite can be found in kaolinite cavities and potassic granite, which can be found in Tonghua, Southeastern Kirin, China. Changbaiite was named after Changbai Mountain in China because it was found there.

== Atomic structure ==
According to Subbarao, changbaiite is orthorhombic at 25 °C with unit cell dimensions of a=17.65, b=17.91, c=7.736 Å and because its big unit cell size it is difficult to do a full structure analysis of PbNb_{2}O_{6}. Changbaiite structure is composed of NbO_{6} octahedral crystals connected at their corners forming circles of 3 to 5 octahedral. The NbO_{6} "cage" has coordination of 8 around oxygen. and the "tunnels" have a coordination of 10 around the Pb^{2+}.

== Physical properties ==
Changbaiite has a trigonal crystal system and a space group of R3m. Its lattice dimensions are a= 10.499 Å c = 11.553 Å. Changbaiite can be found as a small crystal with a tabular or spherules crystal shape. It can get up to 5mm in size and averages from 0.2 to 0.4 mm. Changbaiite's trigonal crystals show 3m symmetry and is bounded, in sequence of lessening prominence. Normally it is colorless or sometimes appears in different schemes of colors like cream white, pale brown, yellowish-brown, pale yellowish-green with white streaks and adamantine to pearly luster.

Changbaiite is nonmagnetic and breakable. Also, it possesses dual quality of translucent to transparent. It has perfect basal cleavage and distinct rhombohedral cleavage with hackly fracture, on the other side spherulitic grains are conchoidal. Ultraviolet light and cathode rays have no fluorescent effect on changbaiite and this is not soluble in hydrochloric acid, nitric acid or sulphuric acid but conditionally less soluble in hot phosphoric acid. Changbaiite has a hardness of 472.4 kg/mm^{2} on the Vickers hardness scale and 5.3 on mohs scale. In an optical spectrum changbaiite is uniaxial positive and it can be biaxial. Changbaiite reflectance, which is the fraction of incident radiation reflected by a surface, is 15.86 at 546 nm.

== Special characteristics ==
Changbaiite is considered to be a ferroelectric mineral. Ferroelectric minerals helped in the development of high-dielectric-constant capacitors and the development of piezoelectric transducers. In the medical field, ferroelectric minerals helped in developing the ultrasonic composite. Ferroelectric minerals are the main cause of many successful industries with high revenues.
