= Lewis Stephen Ramsdell =

American mineralogist

- Born: June 4, 1895; Clinton, Michigan, USA
- Died: June 14, 1975 (aged 80)
- Education: University of Michigan (BS, MS, PhD)
- Known for: Ramsdell notation in polytypism
- Scientific career
- Institutions: University of Michigan

Lewis Stephen Ramsdell (4 June 1895 – 14 June 1975) was an American mineralogist who was a pioneer in the use of X-ray diffraction to study mineral structures.

== Education and career ==
Ramsdell was born in Clinton, Michigan to Dwight and Phoebe Voorhies Ramsdell. He received a BS (1917) from the University of Michigan followed by an MS (1919) and a doctorate (1925). His doctoral work was on the structure of metallic sulphide minerals using X-ray diffraction. He set up the apparatus using a modified dental X-ray system after training in England in 1933 at the University of Manchester. He became an instructor in mineralogy at the University of Michigan, assistant professor (1926), and full professor in 1944. He trained several generations of X-ray crystallographers, was an advisor for Newman Thibault who studied silicon carbide, which became a major area of interest for Ramsdell. He determined the pattern of polytypes in silicon carbides and predicted several arrangements. He also examined the structure of coesite by artificially producing it. It is now used to identify meteorite impacts where it forms due to shock waves.

Ramsdell studied and served as faculty at the University of Michigan for most of his career. His work on the stacking of silicon carbides led to a systematic way of indicating the arrangements which goes by the name of Ramsdell notation. A manganese oxide mineral was named as Ramsdellite in 1943 in his honour. A major book written by him was a textbook of mineralogy.

== Personal life ==
Ramsdell married Lois Ethel Calkins, fellow student at Michigan, in 1920 and they had two daughters.
