= Titanowodginite =

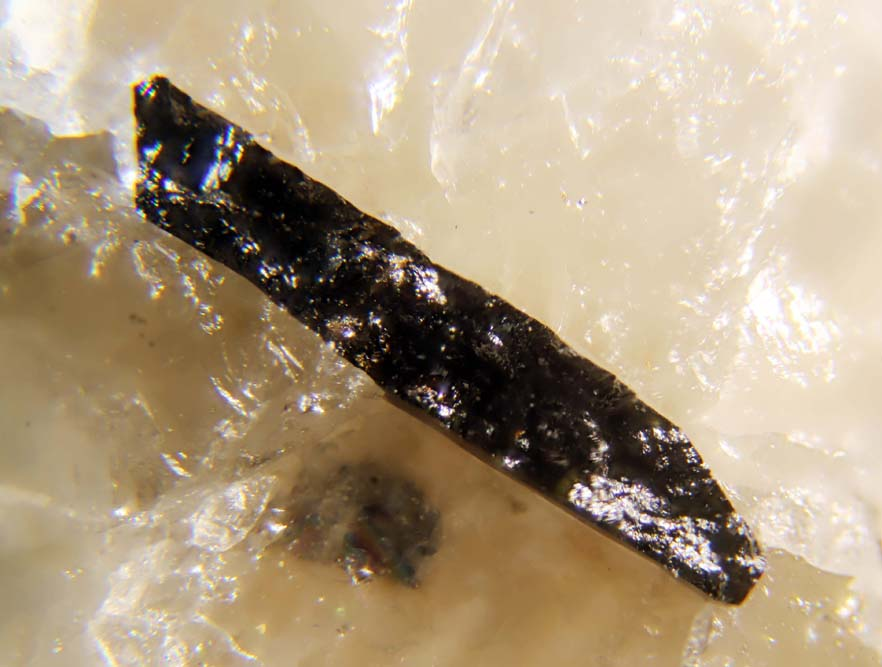
- Black sharp crystals of titanowodginite associated to white beryl from the type locality for the first mineral: Tanco Mine, Bernic Lake, Lac-du-Bonnet, Manitoba, Canada.

General
- Category: Oxide minerals
- Formula: MnTiTa_{2}O_{8}
- IMA symbol: Twdg
- Strunz classification: 4.DB.40
- Crystal system: Monoclinic
- Crystal class: Prismatic (2/m) (same H-M symbol)
- Space group: C2/c

Identification
- Color: dark brown to black
- Luster: vitreous
- Streak: dark brown
- Diaphaneity: translucent

Titanowodginite is a mineral with the chemical formula MnTiTa_{2}O_{8}. Titanowodginite has a Mohs hardness of 5.5 and a vitreous luster. It is an iridescent dark brown to black crystal that commonly forms in a matrix of smoky quartz or white beryl in a complex zoned pegmatite.

It was first described in 1992 for an occurrence in the Tanco Mine located in southern Manitoba, Canada. It was named because it is a titanium bearing member of the wodginite group.
