= Gahnite =

Rare mineral belonging to the spinel group

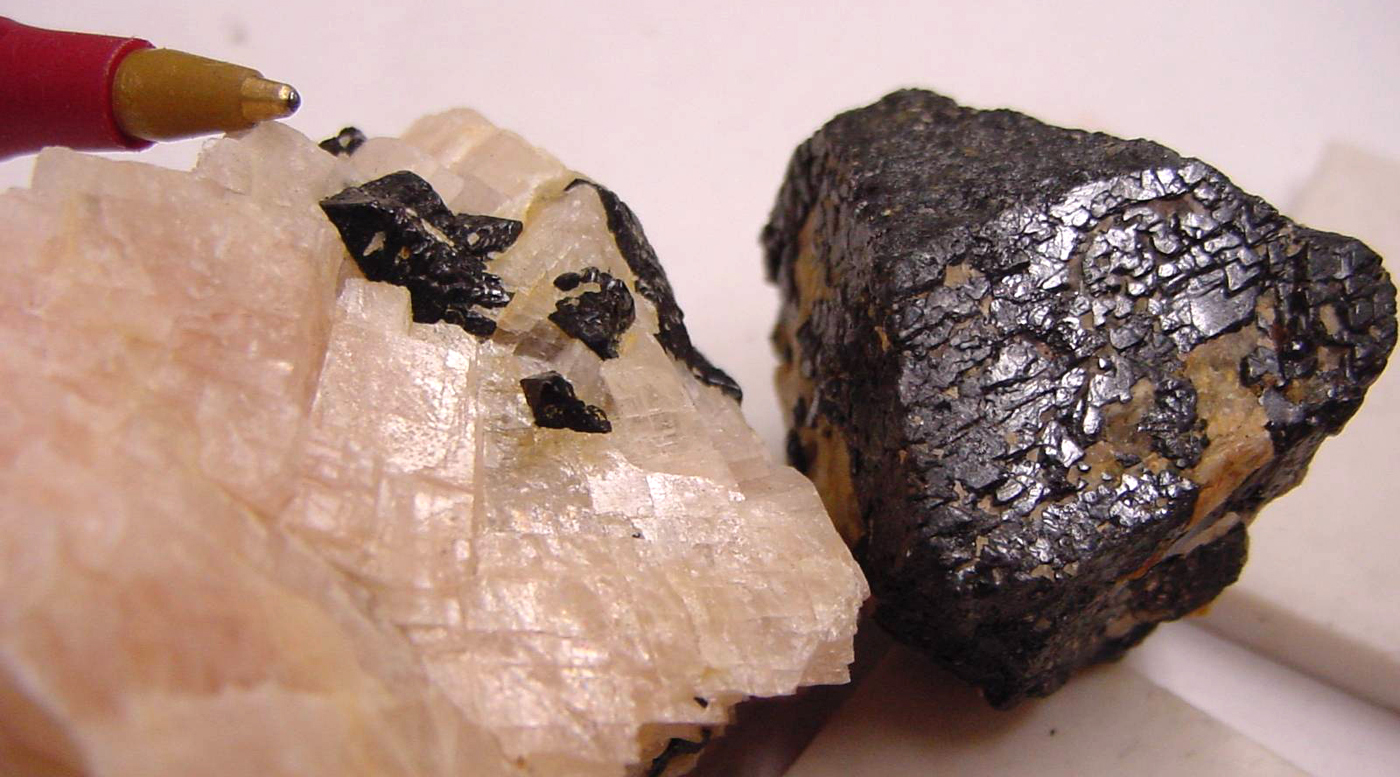

General
- Category: Oxide minerals Spinel group Spinel structural group
- Formula: ZnAl_{2}O_{4}
- IMA symbol: Ghn
- Strunz classification: 4.BB.05
- Crystal system: Cubic
- Crystal class: Hexoctahedral (m3̅m); H-M symbol: (4/m 3̅ 2/m)
- Space group: Fd3̅m

Identification
- Color: Dark green, bluish green, blue to indigo, yellow to brown
- Crystal habit: Typically octahedra, rarely as dodecahedra also massive to granular
- Twinning: Common on [111] produces striations
- Cleavage: Indistinct parting on [111]
- Fracture: Conchoidal, uneven
- Mohs scale hardness: 7.5–8.0
- Luster: Vitreous
- Streak: Grey
- Diaphaneity: Translucent to nearly opaque
- Specific gravity: 4.38–4.60
- Optical properties: Isotropic
- Refractive index: n = 1.79–1.80

Gahnite, ZnAl_{2}O_{4}, is a rare mineral belonging to the spinel group. It forms octahedral crystals which may be green, blue, yellow, brown or grey. It often forms as an alteration product of sphalerite in altered massive sulphide deposits such as at Broken Hill, Australia. Other occurrences include Falun, Sweden where it is found in pegmatites and skarns; and, in the United States, Charlemont, Massachusetts; Spruce Pine, North Carolina; White Picacho district, Arizona; Topsham, Maine; and Franklin, New Jersey.

It was first described in 1807 for an occurrence in the Falu mine, Falun, Dalarna, Sweden, and named after the Swedish chemist, Johan Gottlieb Gahn (1745–1818), the discoverer of the element manganese. It is sometimes called zinc spinel.

== See also ==
- List of minerals named after people
