= Argutite =

General
- Category: Oxide mineral
- Formula: GeO_{2}
- IMA symbol: Agt
- Strunz classification: 4.DB.05
- Dana classification: 04.04.01.07
- Crystal system: Tetragonal; Ditetragonal dipyramidal class
- Space group: Tetragonal; H–M Symbol: (4/m 2/m 2/m); Space group: P4_{2}/mnm
- Unit cell: a = 4.3975, c = 2.8625 [Å]; Z = 2

Identification
- Formula mass: 104.61
- Color: Grayish black, light gray in reflected light
- Crystal habit: Subhedral crystals, as inclusions in sphalerite
- Twinning: Occasionally twinned on {101}
- Mohs scale hardness: 6-7
- Luster: Vitreous - adamantine
- Diaphaneity: Transparent to opaque
- Specific gravity: 6.28 calculated
- Optical properties: Uniaxial (+)
- Refractive index: 2.01

Argutite (GeO_{2}) is a rare germanium oxide mineral. It is a member of the rutile group.

It was first described for an occurrence in the Argut deposit, central Pyrenees, Haute-Garonne, France in 1983. The type locality is within a zinc ore deposit within lower Paleozoic sedimentary rocks that have undergone metamorphism. Associated minerals include sphalerite, cassiterite, siderite and briartite.

== See also ==
- List of minerals
