= Magnus Bromelius =

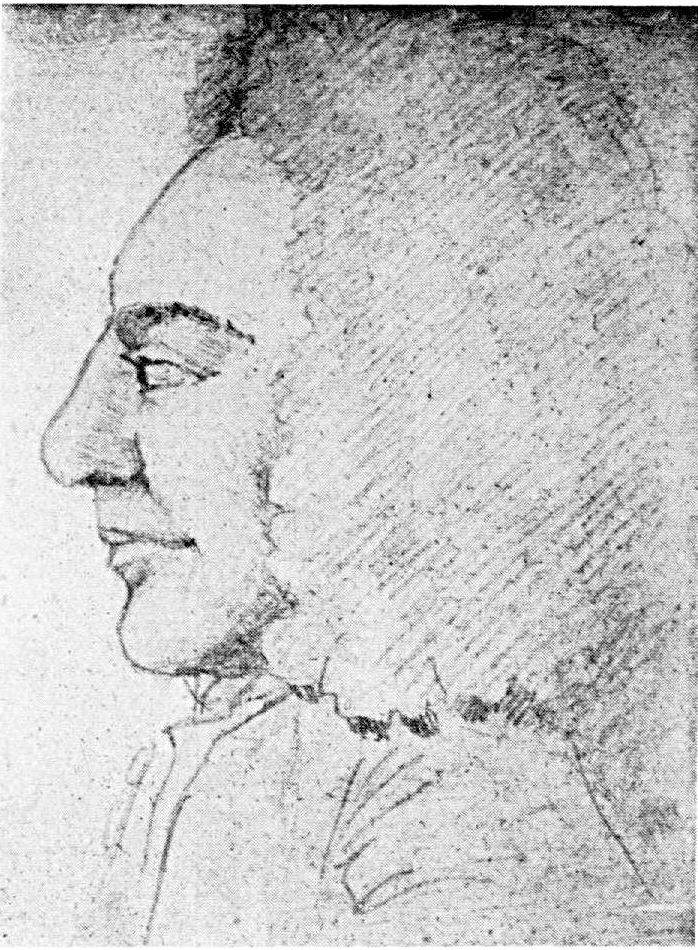
Magnus Bromelius, pencil drawing from Notes on the Swedish doctor, by L. Roberg

Magnus Bromelius, ennobled Von Bromell, born in Stockholm in 1679, died in 1731, was a Swedish physician and paleontologist. He was the son of the physician and botanist Olof Bromelius and Agnes Svinhufvud af Qvalstad.

Bromelius became a doctor of medicine in 1703 in Reims, and was appointed a member of the Collegium medicum in 1705. At the same time he inherited a considerable fortune, which allowed him to devote his time to enlarge the collections of natural objects, coins and medals, he inherited from his father. He was appointed Professor of Anatomy in Stockholm in 1716, but soon left for a position at Collegium medicum, where he became president in 1724. He was elevated in 1726 to nobility.

Bromelius wrote many papers in numismatics, medicine and science. Some of them are contained in the "Acta Literaria et Scientiarum Sveciæ", including "Introduction to essential knowledge to recognize and order all sorts of rocks, metals and fossils, etc." (1730). According to Elias Fries he was the first Swede to describe plant fossils. In Lithographiæ Suecanæ (1727) Bromelius discusses fossil trilobites, corals and shells from Gotland, graptolites, and plant fossils. The mineral bromellite was named in his honour.
