= Cryptomelane =

Oxide mineral

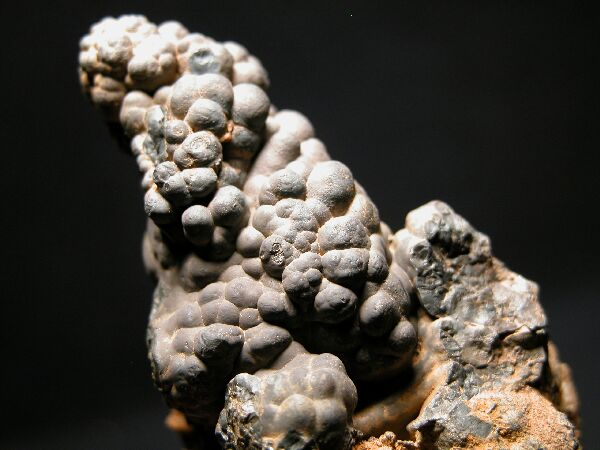

General
- Category: Oxide mineral
- Formula: K(Mn^{4+},Mn^{2+})_{8}O_{16}
- IMA symbol: Cml
- Strunz classification: 4.DK.10
- Crystal system: Tetragonal
- Crystal class: Dipyramidal (4/m); H-M symbol: (4/m)
- Space group: I4/m
- Unit cell: a = 9.956 Å, b = 2.8705 Å, c = 9.706 Å; β = 90.95°; Z = 1

Identification
- Color: Steel-gray to bluish gray; light tan or gray in reflected light
- Crystal habit: Rare as subhedral crystals, commonly as compact fine-grained masses, banded colloform, botryoidal, or radial fibrous aggregates
- Twinning: Twinning developed on (010) and (101) resulting in a pseudotetragonal unit cell.
- Fracture: Conchoidal
- Tenacity: Brittle
- Mohs scale hardness: 6 – 6.5
- Luster: Metallic to dull
- Streak: Brownish black
- Diaphaneity: Opaque
- Specific gravity: 4.17 – 4.41
- Alters to: Tarnishes to dull grayish black

Cryptomelane (K(Mn^{4+},Mn^{2+})_{8}O_{16}) is the potassium endmember of the hollandite group, a family of tectomanganates with a 2 × 2 tunnel structure.

In 1942 the name cryptomelane was proposed as part of an effort to sort out the manganese oxide minerals referred to as psilomelane. Cryptomelane was identified and defined based on X-ray diffraction studies of samples from Tombstone, Arizona; Deming, New Mexico; Mena, Arkansas; and Philipsburg, Montana.

Cryptomelane was approved in 1982 by the International Mineralogical Association (IMA). The type locality is the Tombstone District, Cochise County, Arizona, US. The name comes from the Greek for hidden and black, in reference to the confusion and difficulty in recognition of the various black manganese oxide minerals referred to as psilomelane, the collective term for hard manganese oxides.

It is of rather common occurrence in oxidized manganese deposits where it occurs as replacements and open space fillings in veins and vugs. It occurs in association with hollandite, pyrolusite, nsutite, braunite, chalcophanite, manganite and various other manganese oxides.

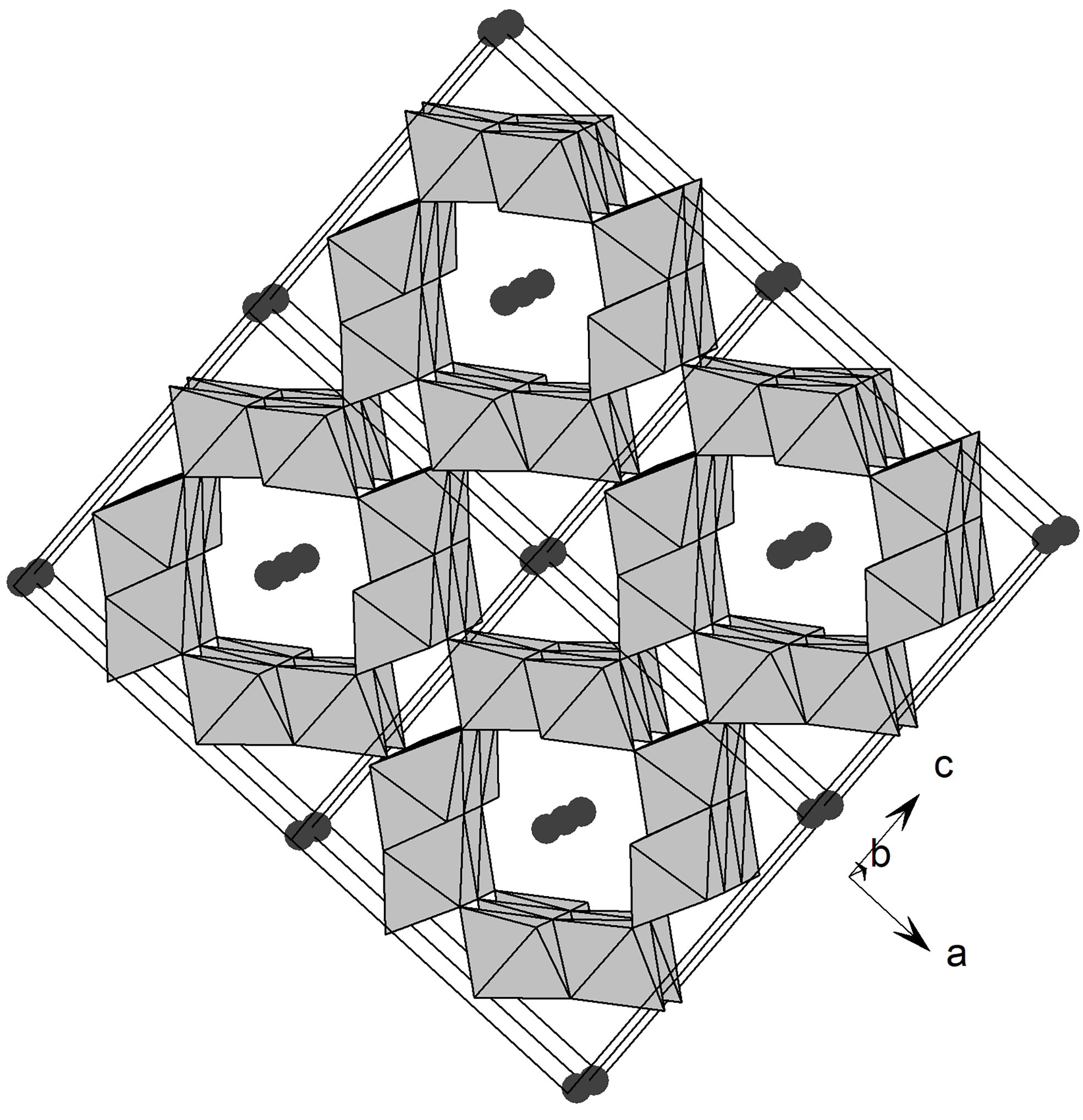
Polyhedral representation of the 2 × 2 tunnel structure of cryptomelane. The black atoms represent K.
