= Freudenbergite =

Oxide mineral

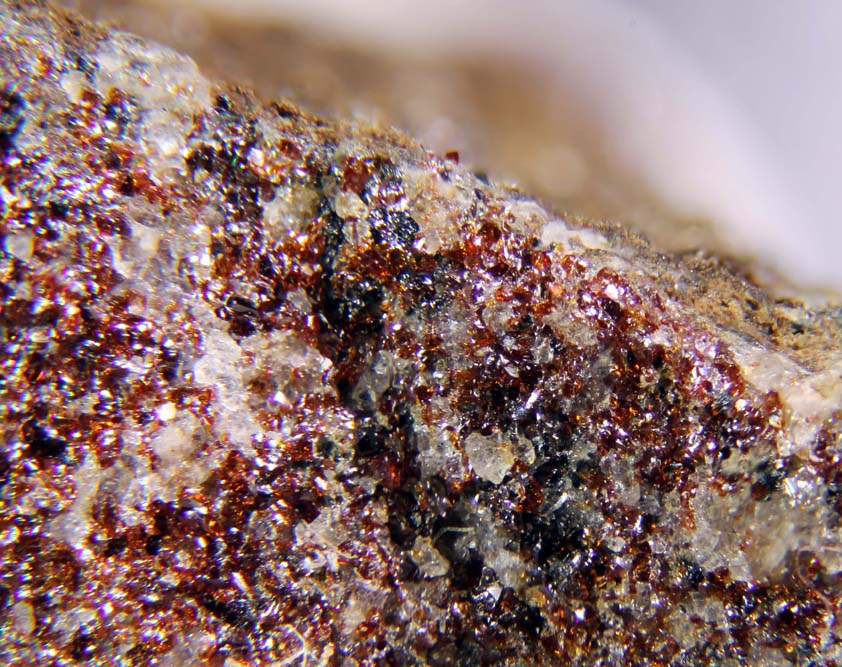
- Black microcrystals of freudenbergite from Kaskasnyunchorr, Khibiny Massif, Russian Federation. The associated mineral is orange-brown rutile.

General
- Category: Oxide minerals
- Formula: Na_{2}(Ti,Fe)_{8}O_{16}
- IMA status: Approved
- Strunz classification: 4.CC.10
- Crystal system: Monoclinic

Identification
- Color: Black; deep brown to light yellowish brown in transmitted light
- Mohs scale hardness: 5
- Specific gravity: 3.956

Freudenbergite is an oxide mineral that is named in honor of Wilhelm Freudenberg, palaeontologist at the University of Tübingen and the University of Göttingen, and curator for mineralogy and geology at the National Collections of Natural History in Karlsruhe. He studied Katzenbuckel rocks.

Naturally occurring freudenbergite is a solid solution of two end members Na_{2}Fe ^{+3}_{2}Ti_{6}O_{16} and Na_{2}Fe ^{+2}Ti_{7}O_{16}, which were referred to as low-Ti and high-Ti freudenbergite, respectively Both varieties were found in the course of close examination of samples from the Katzenbuckel Complex, Germany, in which this mineral was documented for the first time As a possible mineral Fe2+ analog was named UM1983-07-O:FeNaTi

Freudenbergite is monoclinic with straight extinction and high birefringence.

Synthetic freudenbergite was crystallized during the lamprophyllite incongruity melting.

== Bibliography ==
Haggerty, S.E. (1983): A freudenbergite-related mineral in granulites from a kimberlite in Liberia, West Africa. Neues Jahrb. Mineral. Monatsch.: 375-384; in: Dunn, P.J., Cabri, L.J., Ferraiolo, J.A., Grice, J.D., Jambor, J.L., Mueller, W., Shigley, J.E., Puziewicz, J., Vanko, D.A. (1984): New mineral names. American Mineralogist: 69: 1194

Mysen B. O., Virgo D., and Seifert F. A., “Redox equi? libria of iron in alkaline earth silicate melts: relationships between melt structure, oxygen fugacity, temperature and properties of iron?bearing silicate liquids,” Am. Mineral. 69, 834–847 (1984).

Smith, D.G.W., Nickel, E.H. (2007): A System of Codification for Unnamed Minerals: Report of the SubCommittee for Unnamed Minerals of the IMA Commission on New Minerals, Nomenclature and Classification. Canadian Mineralogist: 45: 983-1055; http://nrmima.nrm.se(2016)

Stahle V.; Koch M.; McCammon C. A.; Mann U.; Markl G. (2002). "Occurrence of low-Ti and high-Ti freudenbergite in alkali syenite dikes from the Katzenbuckel volcano, Southwestern Germany". The Canadian Mineralogist (in English and English). 40 (6): 1609–1627. doi:10.2113/gscanmin.40.6.1609. S2CID 16108018. Wikidata Q105611595.

Taylor L. A. and PokhilenkoN., “Ferrous freudenbergite in ilmenite megacrysts: a unique paragenesis from the Dalnaya Kimberlite, Yakutia,” Am. Mineral. 82, 991– 1000 (1997).

Yakovleva O. S., “Mineral diversity of fenitized xenoliths in the Khibina Massif, Kola Peninsula,” in Mineral Diversity: Study and Conservation (Zemyata and Khorata, Sofia, 2009), pp. 193–199 [in Russian].

Zaitsev, V. A., Kogarko, L. N. and Senin, V. G. (2013) ‘Phase equilibria in the system lamprophyllite-nepheline’, Geochemistry International, 51(11), pp. 889–895.
