= Loveringite =

Oxide mineral

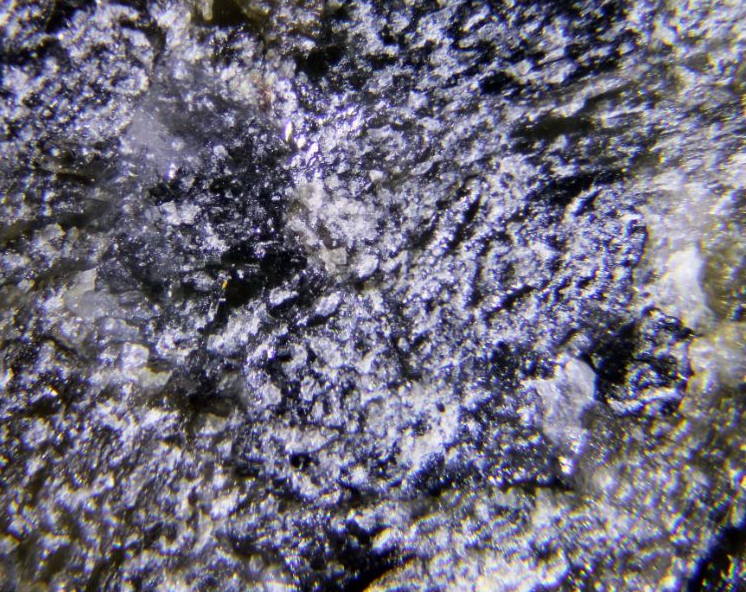

General
- Category: Oxide minerals
- Formula: (Ca,Ce)(Ti,Fe,Cr,Mg)_{21}O_{38}
- IMA symbol: Lvg
- Strunz classification: 4.CC.40
- Crystal system: Trigonal
- Crystal class: Rhombohedral (3̅) (same H-M symbol)
- Space group: R3̅
- Unit cell: a = 10.33, c = 20.67 [Å]; Z = 3

Identification
- Color: Black
- Crystal habit: Anhedral, can be acicular - occurs as needle-like crystals
- Fracture: conchoidal
- Mohs scale hardness: 7.5
- Luster: Metallic
- Streak: Grayish black
- Diaphaneity: Opaque
- Specific gravity: 4.41
- Optical properties: Uniaxial
- Other characteristics: metamict due to trace to minor uranium substitution

Loveringite is a rare metallic oxide mineral of the crichtonite group with the chemical formula (Ca,Ce)(Ti,Fe,Cr,Mg)_{21}O_{38}. It is a late-stage magmatic mineral, formed in the residual melt of mafic layered intrusions in either the olivine-chromite, pyroxene, or plagioclase-rich layers.

== Discovery and occurrence ==
Loveringite was discovered in 1978 in the Jimberlana Intrusion, Dundas Shire, Western Australia, and was named for Australian geochemist and University of Melbourne professor John Francis Lovering, in recognition of his work on fission-track methods in geochemistry.

Loveringite has also been generally found in areas of medium-grade metamorphism, reported from the Hoggar Mountains of Algeria; the Hohe Tauern Mountains, Salzburg, Austria; the Koitelainen intrusion of Lappland, Finland; Bourg d’Oisans, Isere, France; Bracco, Liguria, Italy; the Kerguelen Islands; the Khibiny Massif in the Kola Peninsula of Russia; and at Makwiro on the Great Dyke in Zimbabwe.

== Crystallography ==
Loveringite is trigonal (crystal system), rhombohedral (crystal class), meaning it contains three equal axes each related by 120° and one axis perpendicular to these. It has a three-fold rotation axis as well as a center of symmetry and belongs to the space group R3. Loveringite is found to be grayish white to gray in plane polarized light and does not display pleochroism. Additionally, when viewed in plane polarized light, Loveringite is found to have high relief and has sharp grain boundaries, shows fractures and cleavages well, and sticks out above other minerals in the thin section. Reflectance data indicates that loveringite is anisotropic, showing properties of different values when measured in different directions.
