= Filipstadite =

General
- Category: Oxide mineral
- Formula: (Mn,Mg)(Sb^{5+}_{0.5}Fe^{3}^{+}_{0.5})O_{4}
- IMA symbol: Fps
- Strunz classification: 4.BB.05 (10 ed); 4/B.05-70 (8 ed)
- Dana classification: 7.2.13.1
- Crystal system: Isometric
- Crystal class: Hexoctahedral (m3̅m); H–M Symbol (4/m 3̅ 2/m)
- Space group: Fd3̅m
- Unit cell: a = 25.93 Å (approximated); Z = 216

Identification
- Color: Black
- Crystal habit: modified (pseudo)octahedra
- Twinning: Poor
- Fracture: Conchoidal
- Tenacity: Brittle
- Mohs scale hardness: 6-6.5
- Luster: Metallic
- Streak: Brown
- Density: 4.9 (calculated)
- Optical properties: Biaxal

Filipstadite is a very rare mineral of the spinel group, with the formula (Mn,Mg)(Sb^{5+}_{0.5}Fe^{3}^{+}_{0.5})O_{4}. It is isometric, although it was previously thought to be orthorhombic. When compared to a typical spinel, both the octahedral and tetrahedral sites are split due to cation ordering. Filipstadite is chemically close to melanostibite. The mineral comes from Långban, Sweden, a manganese skarn deposit famous for many rare minerals.

== Occurrence and association ==
In the metamorphic Fe-Mn ore bodies of the Långban-type filipstadite associates with native antimony, calcite, native copper, forsterite, hausmannite, hedyphane, ingersonite, jacobsite, phlogopite, and svabite.

== Notes on crystal structure ==
Cations and anions in filipstadite occupy 1/8 of the octahedral and 1/2 of the tetrahedral holes of the spinel-type oxygen lattice, that has cubic close-packing. Tetrahedral sites are split into 5, and octahedral into 6 substitutes, due to cation ordering, which also causes the unit cell edge to be tripled. Antimony, most of magnesium and trace aluminium are located on the octahedral (M) sites, trace magnesium, zinc and silicon are on the tetrahedral (T) sites. Manganese and iron are on both M and T sites.
