= Bromellite =

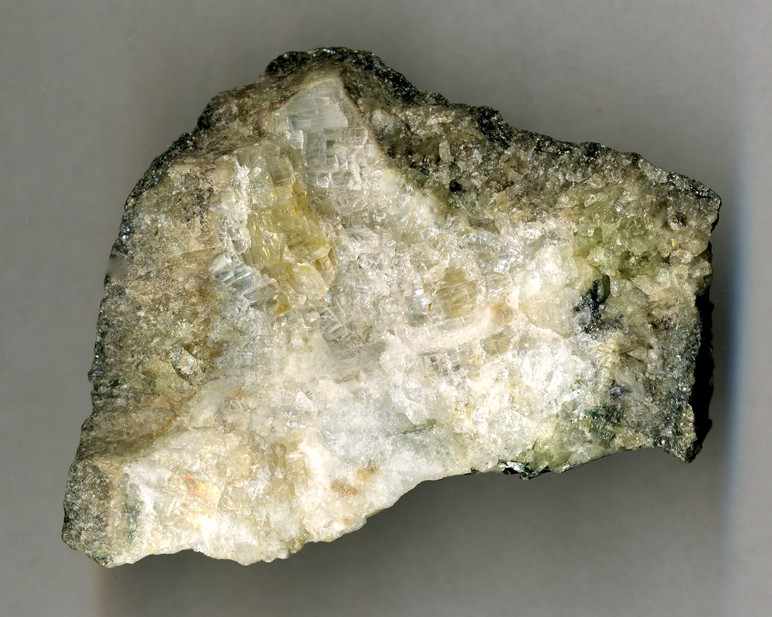
- A yellowish crystal of bromellite

General
- Category: Oxide minerals
- Formula: BeO (beryllium oxide)
- Strunz classification: 4.AB.20
- Crystal system: Hexagonal
- Crystal class: Dihexagonal pyramidal (6mm); H-M symbol: (6mm)
- Space group: P6_{3}mc

Identification
- Color: White, colorless
- Crystal habit: prismatic
- Cleavage: [1010] Distinct
- Mohs scale hardness: 9
- Luster: Vitreous
- Streak: White
- Diaphaneity: Transparent to translucent
- Specific gravity: 3.02
- Refractive index: 1.719, 1.733
- Pleochroism: None
- Melting point: 2,570 °C (4,660 °F)

Bromellite, whose name derives from the Swedish chemist Magnus von Bromell (1670–1731), is a white oxide mineral. The mineral form of beryllium oxide, it is found in complex pegmatitic manganese-iron deposits, but is more frequently made synthetically. This is a rare mineral to encounter in its natural state, but it has been made synthetically for over 40 years.

== Uses of bromellite ==
Bromellite, as a beryllium-containing mineral, has some uses. Industrially, natural specimens have the potential to be an ore of beryllium. It is one of the reagents that can be used in the manufacture of artificial emeralds. As an additive, bromellite confers high mechanical strength and very high thermal conductivity. In nuclear reactors, it is used as a moderator for fast neutrons. Ceramics containing bromellite are used in electronics, as well as crucibles for the melting of uranium and thorium. Bromellite, both natural and synthetic, is also used as a gemstone or as a collector's mineral. As a gemstone bromellite is extremely rare. To date there has been found only one crystal that is large enough to be cut. In 2000 Dunil Palitha Gunasekara of Ratnapura, Sri Lanka purchased a rough colorless 17.77-ct crystal from Ratnapura. He cut it into 15 pieces, of which 3 pieces with 2.80, 1.92 and 0.68 ct were sent to the GIA laboratory for further testing, since he thought them to be johachidolite at first. These gemstones are the first reported examples of faceted gem-quality bromellite.
