= Hydrokenoelsmoreite =

Hydrous tungsten oxide mineral

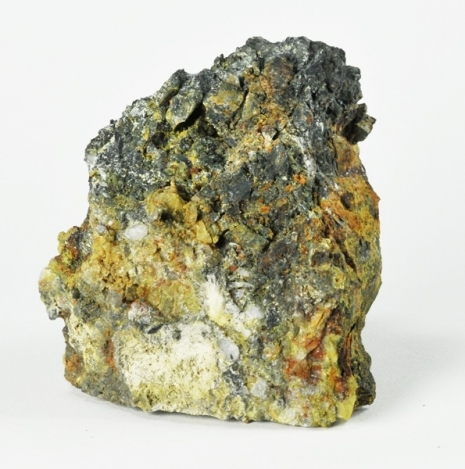
- White stolzite grains accent rich yellow veins of Hydrokenoelsmoreite microcrystals

General
- Category: Oxide minerals
- Formula: □_{2}W_{2}O_{6}H_{2}O
- IMA symbol: Hkm
- Strunz classification: 4.DH.15
- Crystal system: 3C polytype: Isometric; 6R polytype: Trigonal
- Crystal class: 3C polytype: Hexoctahedral (m3̅m); 6R polytype: Rhombohedral (3̅)

Identification
- Color: White
- Cleavage: None
- Fracture: Splintery
- Tenacity: Brittle
- Mohs scale hardness: 3
- Luster: Adamantine
- Streak: White

Hydrokenoelsmoreite is a hydrous tungsten oxide mineral with formula □_{2}W_{2}O_{6}(H_{2}O). Hydrokenoelsmoreite is a colorless to white, translucent isometric mineral. It has a Mohs hardness of 3, exhibits no cleavage and has a splintery fracture. It has a vitreous to adamantine luster. It is optically isotropic with an index of refraction of n = 2.24.

It forms from the oxidation of ferberite within granitic pegmatite dykes and in pegmatitic greisen veins. It has a structure based on a defect pyrochlore lattice (A2B2O6O’).

It was first described for an occurrence in Elsmore Hill, New South Wales, Australia from where it takes its name.
