= Dzhalindite =

Rare indium hydroxide mineral

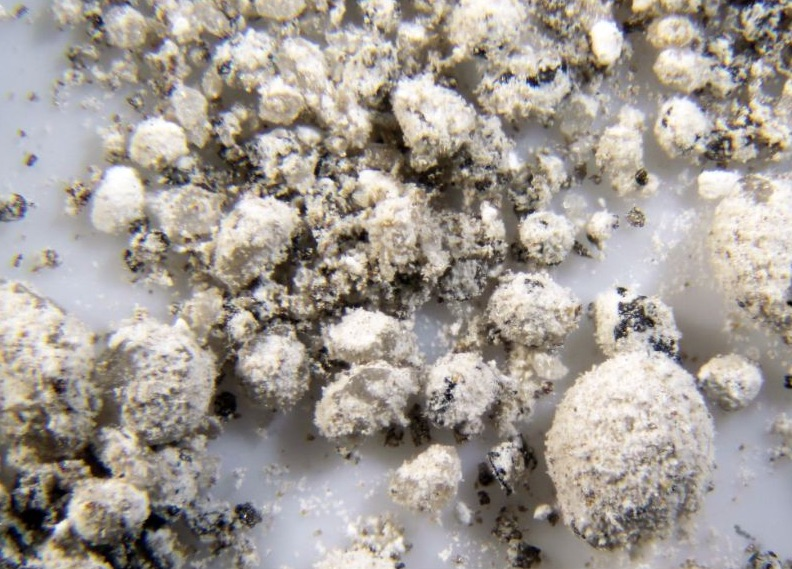
- Dzhalindite and indite

General
- Category: Oxide mineral
- Formula: In(OH)_{3}
- IMA symbol: Dz
- Strunz classification: 4.FC.05
- Crystal system: Cubic
- Crystal class: Diploidal (m3̅); H-M symbol: (2/m 3̅)
- Space group: Im3̅
- Unit cell: a = 7.9743(6) Å; Z = 8

Identification
- Color: Yellow-brown; light yellow in transmitted light; dark gray in reflected light
- Crystal habit: Massive
- Mohs scale hardness: 4 - 4.5
- Diaphaneity: Transparent to subopaque
- Specific gravity: 4.38
- Optical properties: Isotropic
- Refractive index: n = 1.725

Dzhalindite is a rare indium hydroxide mineral discovered in Siberia. Its chemical formula is In(OH)_{3}.

It was first described in 1963 for an occurrence in the Dzhalinda tin deposit, Malyi Khingan Range, Khabarovskiy Kray, Far-Eastern Region, Russia.

It has also been reported from Mount Pleasant, New Brunswick, Canada; the Flambeau mine, Ladysmith, Rusk County, Wisconsin, US; in the Mangabeira tin deposit, Goiás, Brazil; Attica, mines of the Lavrion District, Greece; the Ore Mountains in Germany and the Czech Republic; the Chūbu region, Honshu Island, Japan; and the Arashan Massif of Tashkent, Uzbekistan.
