= Aeschynite-(Nd) =

General
- Category: Minerals
- Formula: (Nd,Ce,Ca,Th)(Ti,Nb)_{2}(O,OH)_{6}
- IMA symbol: Aes-Nd
- Strunz classification: 4.DF.05
- Dana classification: 8.3.6.5
- Crystal system: Orthorhombic
- Crystal class: Dipyramidal (mmm); H-M symbol: (2/m 2/m 2/m)

Identification
- Formula mass: 346.61 gm
- Color: Dark to pale brown, brownish black
- Crystal habit: Metamict
- Fracture: Conchoidal
- Tenacity: Brittle
- Mohs scale hardness: 5 – 6
- Luster: Adamantine
- Streak: Pale yellowish brown
- Diaphaneity: Subtranslucent
- Specific gravity: 4.60 – 5.04
- Density: 4.6 – 5.04 g/cm^{3}
- Optical properties: 2.1 – 2.4
- 2V angle: 78° – 82°
- Dispersion: Weak to strong

Aeschynite-(Nd) is a rare earth mineral of neodymium, cerium, calcium, thorium, titanium, niobium, oxygen, and hydrogen with the chemical formula (Nd,Ce,Ca,Th)(Ti,Nb)_{2}(O,OH)_{6}. Its name comes from the Greek word for "shame". Its Mohs scale rating is 5 to 6. It is a member of the hydroxide minerals.

It was first reported for an occurrence in Bayan Obo, Inner Mongolia in 1982. In that rare earth mining deposit it occurs in veins within metamorphosed dolomite and slate. It occurs associated with aegirine, riebeckite, barite, fluorite, albite, phlogopite and magnetite. The IMA symbol is Aes-Nd.

== See also ==
- List of minerals
