= Agrinierite =

Uranium-containing mineral

Agrinierite [Agn]
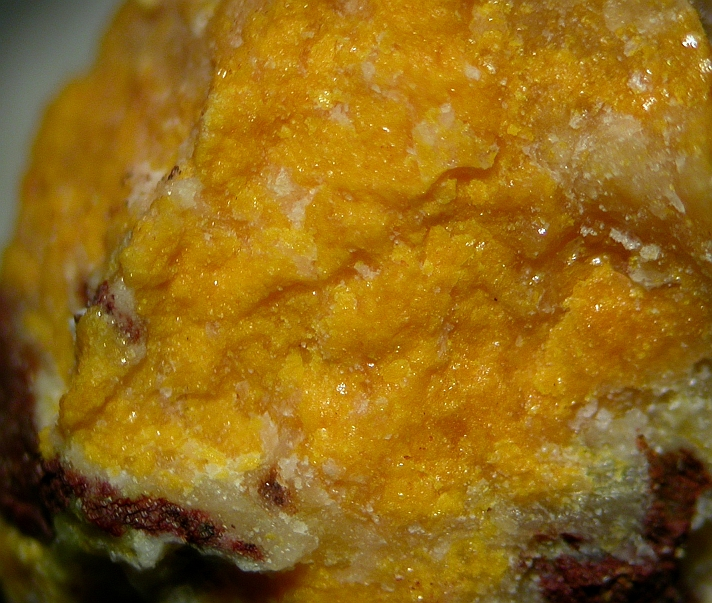

General
- Category: Minerals
- Formula: K2(Ca,Sr)[(UO2)3O3(OH)2]2 · 5H2O
- IMA symbol: Agn
- Crystal system: monoclinic

Identification
- Color: Orange
- Crystal habit: Pseudo Hexagonal - Crystals show a hexagonal outline.
- Twinning: Sector twins with composition plane {110}
- Cleavage: Distinct/Good on {001}
- Luster: Resinous - Greasy
- Diaphaneity: Transparent, Translucent
- Specific gravity: 5.7
- Density: 5.62 - 5.7, Average = 5.66
- Dispersion: relatively weak
- Other characteristics: Radioactive

Agrinierite is a mineral often found in the oxidation zone of uranium deposits. It is named after Henry Agrinier (1928–1971), a French engineer for the Commissariat à l'Énergie Atomique (Mineralogy Laboratory of the French Atomic Energy Commission, Paris, France). Agrinierite is a hydrated oxide of uranium discovered during the exploitation of the uranium deposit of Margnac (Haute-Vienne, France), the only site in the world where it is known today. It appears at the periphery of uraninite nodules accompanied by other uranium oxides which result like it from the transformation of uraninite (becquerelite, schoepite, compreignacite, rameauite, etc.). Agrinierite occurs as small tabular orange crystals, transparent to translucent, submillimeter in size, frequently twinned which gives them a pseudohexagonal appearance.

== See also ==
- List of minerals
