= Kamiokite =

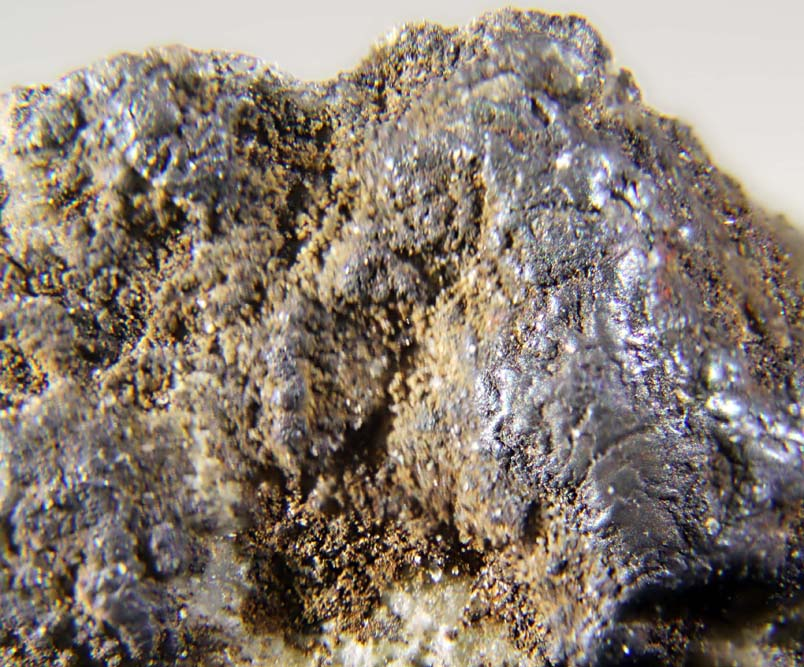
- Grey crystal aggregates of the very rare molybdenum mineral kamiokite from Mohawk Mine, Keweenaw, Michigan, United States of America.

General
- Category: Oxide minerals
- Formula: Fe_{2}Mo_{3}O_{8}
- IMA symbol: Kmk
- Strunz classification: 4.CB.40
- Crystal system: Hexagonal
- Crystal class: Dihexagonal pyramidal (6mm); H-M symbol: (6mm)
- Space group: P6_{3}mc
- Unit cell: a = 5.782, b = 5.782 c = 10.053 [Å]; Z = 2

Identification
- Formula mass: 527.5 g/mol
- Color: black, gray
- Crystal habit: tabular
- Twinning: none
- Cleavage: perfect {0001}
- Fracture: even
- Mohs scale hardness: 4.5
- Luster: metallic, sub-metallic
- Streak: black
- Diaphaneity: opaque
- Density: measured= 5.96 g/cm3; calculated= 6.02 g/cm3
- Optical properties: anisotropic, uniaxial negative
- Pleochroism: distinct, gray to dark greenish gray
- Other characteristics: Rotation tints of brownish yellow

Kamiokite is an iron-molybdenum oxide mineral with the chemical formula Fe_{2}Mo_{3}O_{8}. The name kamiokite is derived from the locality, the Kamioka mine in Gifu Prefecture, Japan, where this mineral was first discovered in 1975.

Kamiokite is a hexagonal system with equal axes a_{1}, a_{2}, a_{3}. These three axes of the kamiokite crystal are uniformly separated by 120°. Kamiokite is an anisotropic mineral, meaning that light travels through the mineral in different directions and velocities. Kamiokite is strongly pleochroic and is also birefringent.

Kamiokite can be found as inclusions in domeykite, algodonite, and magnetite. Kamiokite is associated with copper arsenides found in Michigan's Mohawk and Ahmeek copper mines. Although rare, kamiokite is predominantly found in mining environments and can indicate the presence of other minerals of interest, such as copper in the case of the Mohawk and Ahmeek mines. It is speculated that kamiokite can enhance the concentration of the copper it is hosted in.

There are no known health risks associated with this mineral.
