= Hiärneite =

General
- Category: Oxide mineral
- Formula: (Ca,Mn,Na)_{2}(Zr,Mn^{3+})_{5}(Sb,Ti,Fe)_{2}O_{16}
- IMA symbol: Hiä
- Strunz classification: 4.DL.10
- Crystal system: Tetragonal
- Crystal class: Ditetragonal dipyramidal (4/mmm); H-M symbol: (4/m 2/m 2/m)
- Space group: I4_{1}/acd
- Unit cell: a = 15.264 Å, c = 10.089 Å; Z = 8

Identification
- Color: Red
- Crystal habit: Prismatic, subhedral
- Cleavage: None
- Mohs scale hardness: 7
- Diaphaneity: Translucent
- Specific gravity: 5.44
- Optical properties: Uniaxial (+)
- Refractive index: n_{ω} = 2.120 n_{ε} = 2.160
- Birefringence: δ = 0.040

Hiärneite is an oxide mineral named after the Swedish geologist Urban Hiärne (1641–1727). The mineral can be found in rocks that mainly consists of fine grained phlogopite. Hiärneite is the first known mineral that contains both of the chemical elements antimony and zirconium. The mineral was described in 1997 for its occurrence in a skarn environment in Långban iron–manganese deposit of the Filipstad district, Värmland, Sweden.
