= Aeschynite-(Ce) =

Oxide mineral

General
- Category: Oxide minerals
- Formula: (Ce,Ca,Fe,Th)(Ti,Nb)_{2}(O,OH)_{6}
- IMA symbol: Aes-Ce
- Strunz classification: 4.DF.05
- Dana classification: 08.03.06.01
- Crystal system: Orthorhombic; Dipyramidal class
- Space group: H-M symbol: (2/m 2/m 2/m); Space group: Pmnb
- Unit cell: a = 11.08, b = 7.56 c = 5.37 [Å]; Z = 4

Identification
- Formula mass: 305.70 g/mol
- Color: Brown, light brown, brownish black, yellow, black
- Crystal habit: Acicular, massive
- Cleavage: None
- Fracture: Brittle - conchoidal
- Tenacity: Brittle
- Mohs scale hardness: 5 - 6
- Luster: Adamantine, resinous to waxy, sub-metallic; dull when altered
- Streak: Nearly black to brown
- Diaphaneity: Transparent to translucent
- Specific gravity: 4.52
- Density: 5.19
- Optical properties: Isotropic when metamict
- Refractive index: 2.26
- Other characteristics: Radioactive

Aeschynite-(Ce) (or Aschynite, Eschinite, Eschynite) is a rare earth mineral of cerium, calcium, iron, thorium, titanium, niobium, oxygen, and hydrogen with chemical formula (Ce,Ca,Fe,Th)(Ti,Nb)_{2}(O,OH)_{6}. Its name comes from the Greek word αισχύνη ("aeschyne") for "shame" because early chemists had difficulty with separations of titanium from zirconium.

The "-(Ce)" means it has more cerium than the yttrium variety aeschynite-(Y). Its Mohs scale rating is 5–6.

== See also ==
- List of minerals
