= Dessauite-(Y) =

Mineral

General
- Category: Oxide mineral Crichtonite group
- Formula: (Sr,Pb)(Y,U)(Ti,Fe^{3+})_{20}O_{38}
- IMA symbol: Dss-Y
- Strunz classification: 4.CC.40
- Crystal system: Trigonal
- Crystal class: Rhombohedral (3̅); H-M symbol: (3̅)
- Space group: R3̅
- Unit cell: a = 9.197 Å, α = 68.75°

Identification
- Formula mass: 1,856.57 g/mol
- Color: Black; ash-grey with pale bluish tones.
- Crystal habit: Tabular
- Cleavage: None
- Fracture: Conchoidal
- Tenacity: Brittle
- Mohs scale hardness: 6 1/2 – 7
- Luster: Metallic luster
- Streak: Black
- Diaphaneity: Opaque
- Density: 4.68 g/cm^{3} (calculated)
- Birefringence: Low
- Pleochroism: Very weak

Dessauite-(Y) is a mineral member of the crichtonite group with the formula (Sr,Pb)(Y,U)(Ti,Fe^{3+})_{20}O_{38}. It is associated with derbylite, hematite, rutile, karelianite, siderite, and calcite. Founded in the Buca della Vena Mine, Tuscany, Italy, the mineral was called dessauite in honor of professor Gabor Dessau (1907–1983).

== Structure ==
Dessauite occurs as small, flattened rhombohedral crystals, tabular {001} with hexagonal outline. Members of the crichtonite group may be confused with ilmenite or hematite. The difference between dessauite and other minerals in the crichtonite group is the occurrence of three additional octahedral sites and of a site in square pyramidal coordination, all with low occupancies. The mineral is black and opaque, presents a metallic luster, and it is brittle. Dessauite presents dimensions of diameter up to 1mm and thickness up to 0.2 mm. In reflected plane-polarized light the color is ash-grey with pale bluish tones. The calculated density is 4.68 g/cm^{3}. The habit is tabular, forming thin dimensions in one direction and hardness of 6.5 and 7. Dessauite differs from other elements of the crichtonite group because of the quantity of cations and X-ray diffraction pattern.

== Occurrence ==
Dessauite was found in the Buca della Vena Mine, Apuan Alps, northern Tuscany, Italy, with many other minerals, coming from hydrothermal fluids circulating through a small hematite-barite ore deposit within dolomite, during an alpine metamorphic event. It occurs in calcite veins hosted within dolomite and is associated with calcite, rutile, hematite, siderite, and derbylite.

== See also ==
- List of minerals
