= Stibiotantalite =

Mineral (Sb(Ta,Nb)O4)

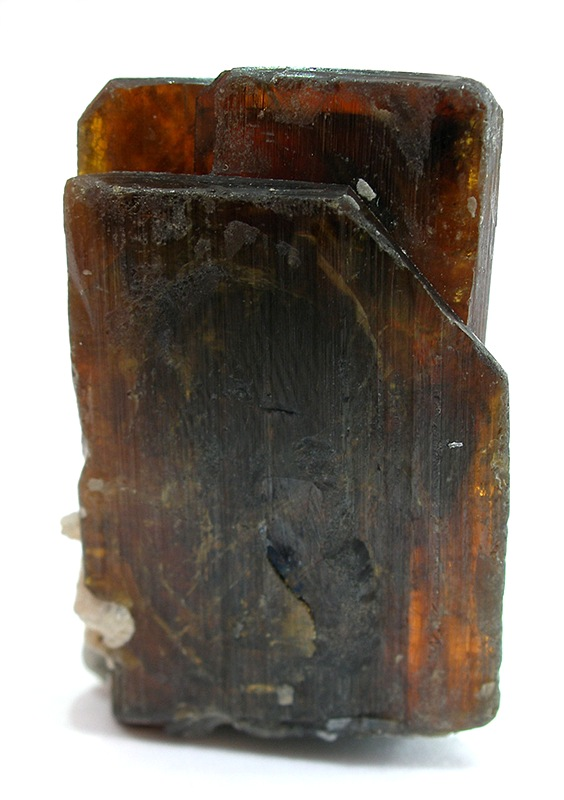

General
- Category: Oxide minerals
- Formula: SbTaO_{4}
- IMA symbol: Sttl
- Strunz classification: 04.DE.30
- Dana classification: 08.01.06.02
- Crystal system: orthorhombic
- Space group: mm2
- Unit cell: a = 4.9, b = 11.79, c = 5.57Å, Z = 4; V = 321.78

Identification
- Formula mass: 336.70
- Colour: yellow to dark brown, reddish
- Fracture: brittle-conchoidal
- Mohs scale hardness: 5.5
- Streak: light yellow
- Diaphaneity: transparent to translucent
- Density: 6 to 7.57
- Refractive index: 1.55 - 1.69
- Birefringence: Biaxial (+), a=2.3742, b=2.4039
- 2V angle: 75.083
- Dispersion: strong

Stibiotantalite is a tantalate mineral found in complex granite pegmatites. Stibiotantalite constitutes the tantalum endpoint of a Sb(Ta,Nb)O_{4} solid solution series with its niobium analogue stibiocolumbite.

It is translucent to transparent, medium hard (5.5 mohs), appears yellow to dark brown, reddish or greenish brown, with an adamantine luster.

Stibiotantalite is found in veins and walls associated with tin mines. It is a fairly rare to rare mineral. Due to its relative softness, it is more likely to be found in mineral collections than in jewelry.

== Occurrence ==
Stibiotantalite has been found in several countries, but the most significant are Mozambique, Sri Lanka, and the USA. It occurs in complex granite pegmatites.

Mozambique and the USA have the most localities where Stibiotantalite has been found. Mozambique has 6, while the USA has 18. California alone has 15 of these localities.

== Use ==
Stibiotantalite is primarily used as a gemstone. These gems are vivid, shiny, and golden-brown. These gems come between 0.73 carats and 6.34 carats, with the average being 3.54. These gems are similar in appearance to sphalerite, but they are brown instead of orange. While stibiotantalite and tantalite are similar, stibiotantalite is softer, brighter, and heavier.

== Etymology ==
The "stibio-" prefix is a reference to its antimony content. The tantalite suffix shows that the mineral is actually very similar to tantalite.
