= Sayrite =

General
- Category: Minerals
- Formula: Pb_{2}(UO_{2})_{5}O_{6}(OH)_{2}4(H_{2}O)+
- IMA symbol: Syr
- Strunz classification: 4/H.07-40
- Dana classification: 5.9.6.1
- Crystal system: monoclinic
- Unit cell: a = 10.7 Å, b = 6.96 Å, c = 14.53 Å β = 116.81°

Identification
- Colour: orange
- Cleavage: Distinct
- Density: 6.76
- Refractive index: 1.77
- Birefringence: Biaxial (-)
- Dispersion: relatively weak
- Other characteristics: Radioactive

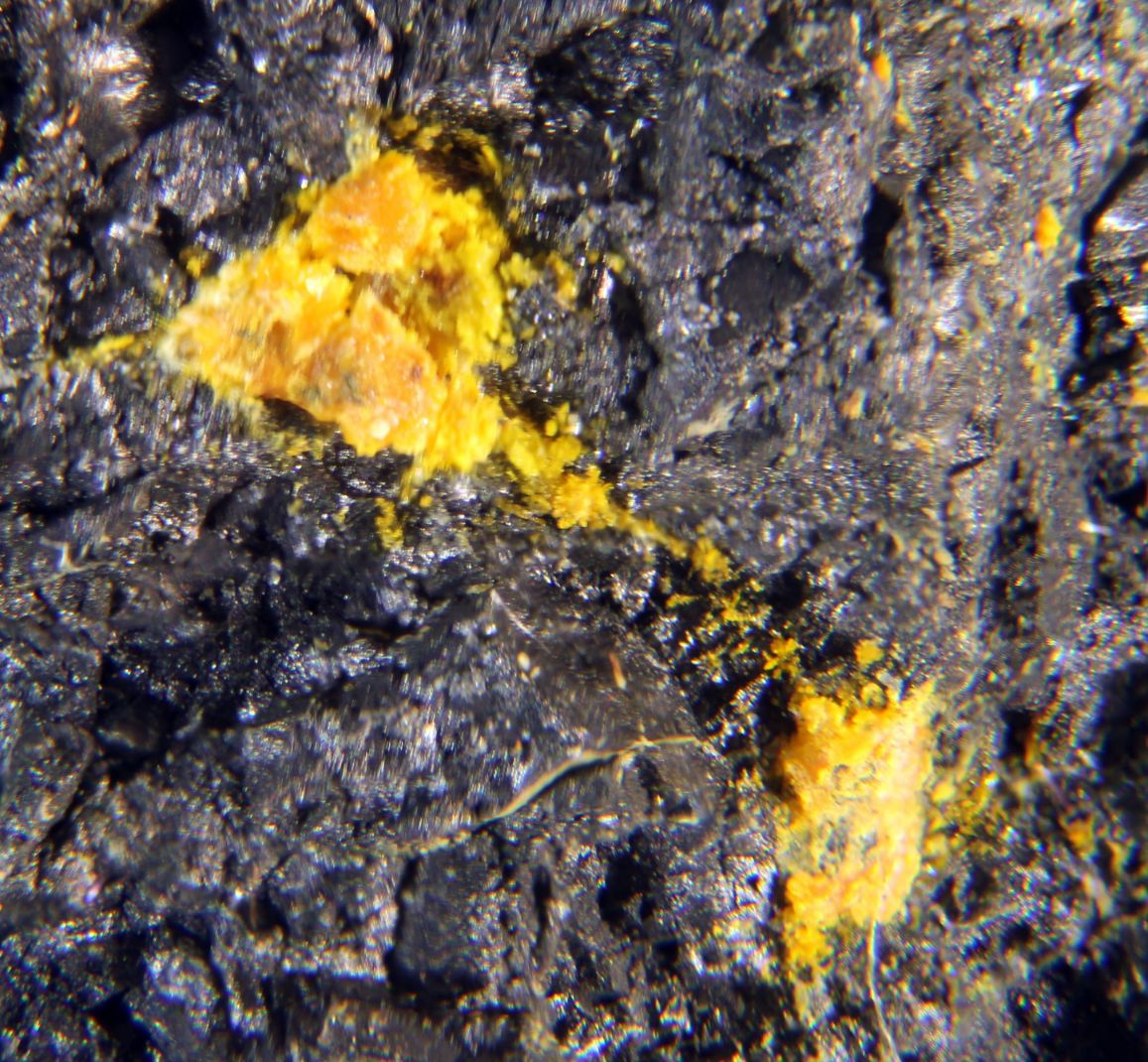
Orange crystals of sayrite.

Sayrite (Pb_{2}(UO_{2})_{5}O_{6}(OH)_{2}4(H_{2}O)) is an alteration product of uraninite named after the X-ray crystallographer David Sayre. Sayrite contains hydrogen, oxygen, uranium and lead. It is mined at Shinkolobwe Mine, (Kasolo Mine), Kambove District, Haut-Katanga, Democratic Republic of the Congo. It is usually orange in color but also can be reddish and yellowish and is in the monoclinic crystal system.
