= Oxyyttropyrochlore-(Y) =

Potential (not yet accepted) zero-valent-dominant mineral of the pyrochlore group

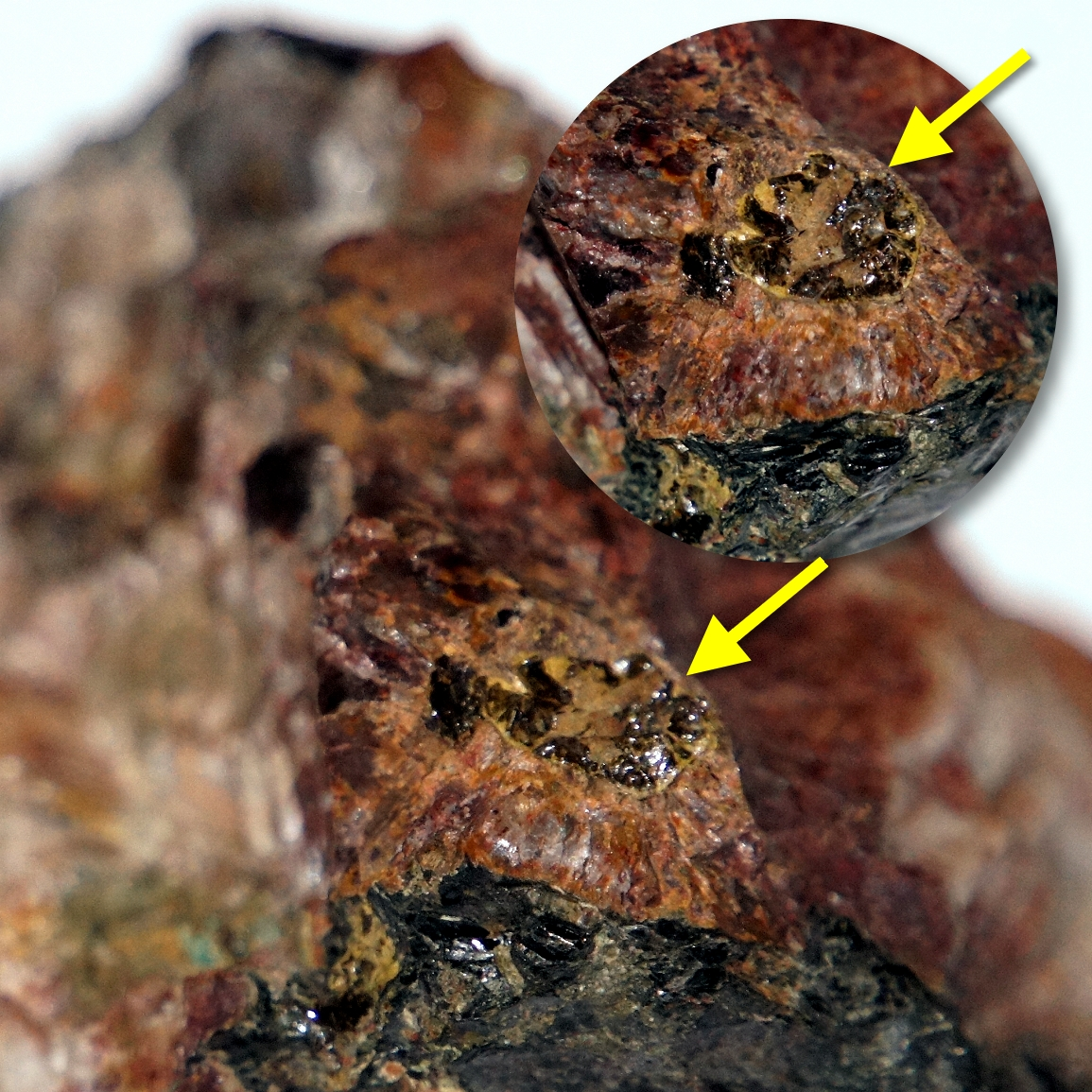
Oxyyttropyrochlore-(Y) (obruchevite)

Oxyyttropyrochlore-(Y), also referred to as "obruchevite" or "yttropyrochlore-(Y)", is a potential (not yet accepted) zero-valent-dominant mineral of the pyrochlore group. Its formula can be written as (Y,◻)_{2}Nb_{2}O_{2}O.

The name "yttropyrochlore-(Y)" for this compound was used by Kalita (1957), and Ercit et al. (2003), but it has become obsolete and the mineral status is not yet clear. The yttropyrochlore-(Y) as mentioned by Tindle & Breaks (1998) is in fact "oxyyttropyrochlore-(Y)".
