= Rameauite =

General
- Category: Oxide mineral
- Formula: K_{2}Ca(UO_{2})_{6}(OH)_{16}·H_{2}O or K_{2}CaU^{6+}_{6}O_{20}·9H_{2}O
- IMA symbol: Rme
- Strunz classification: 4.GB.05
- Crystal system: Monoclinic
- Crystal class: Prismatic (2/m) (same H-M symbol)
- Space group: C2/c
- Unit cell: a= 13.97 Å, b= 14.26 Å c= 14.22 Å, β = 121.02°: Z = 4

Identification
- Formula mass: 2,028.57 g/mol
- Color: Orange
- Crystal habit: Prismatic and/or can consist of a hexagonal outline
- Twinning: On {100}
- Cleavage: Good cleavage
- Diaphaneity: Semitransparent
- Density: 5.6
- Optical properties: Biaxial Negative
- Refractive index: a= n.d. β= 1.95 γ= 1.97
- 2V angle: 32° (meas.)
- Other characteristics: Radioactive

Rameauite is a hydrated complex uranyl oxide mineral with formula K_{2}Ca(UO_{2})_{6}(OH)_{16}·H_{2}O or K_{2}CaU^{6+}_{6}O_{20}·9H_{2}O.

== Crystallography ==
Rameauite has four observed forms which are {010}, {100}, {001} and {110}. The angles between these faces are {100}^{001} = 58°40' and {010}^{110} = 49° 50'. The crystals are always twinned on {100} and they are flattened parallel to {010}, and elongated parallel to {001}. The mineral rameauite is an example of a monoclinic mineral and appears pseudo-hexagonal. I has unit cell dimensions of: a= 13.97, b= 14.26, c= 14.22 with β = 121.02°.

== Occurrence ==
It was first described in 1972 for an occurrence in the Margnac Mine, Compreignac, Haute-Vienne, Limousin, France and named after Jacques Rameau (1926–1960), French prospector at the "Commissariat à l'Energie Atomique", who discovered the deposit where the mineral occurs. In addition to the type locality in France it has been reported from the Orphan Mine on the south rim of the Grand Canyon in Arizona and on Rhyolite Ridge, Esmeralda County, Nevada.
