= Aeschynite-(Y) =

Rare earth mineral

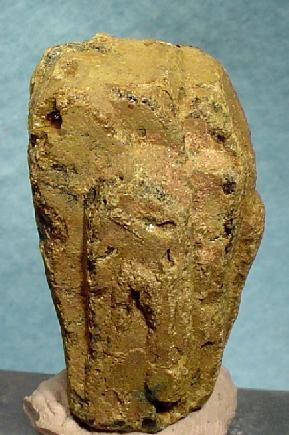
- A fine, well-terminated, complete all-around aeschynite-(Y) crystal from Iveland, Norway

General
- Category: Oxide mineral
- Formula: (Y,Ca,Fe,Th)(Ti,Nb)_{2}(O,OH)_{6}
- IMA symbol: Aes-Y
- Strunz classification: 4.DF.05
- Crystal system: Orthorhombic
- Crystal class: Dipyramidal (mmm); H-M symbol: (2/m 2/m 2/m)
- Space group: Pmnb

Identification
- Other characteristics: Radioactive

Aeschynite-(Y) (or Aeschinite-(Y), Aeschynite-(Yt), Blomstrandine, Priorite) is a rare earth mineral of yttrium, calcium, iron, thorium, titanium, niobium, oxygen, and hydrogen with the chemical formula (Y,Ca,Fe,Th)(Ti,Nb)_{2}(O,OH)_{6}. Its name comes from the Greek word for "shame". Its Mohs scale rating is 5 to 6.

== See also ==
- List of minerals
