= Nsutite =

Manganese oxide mineral

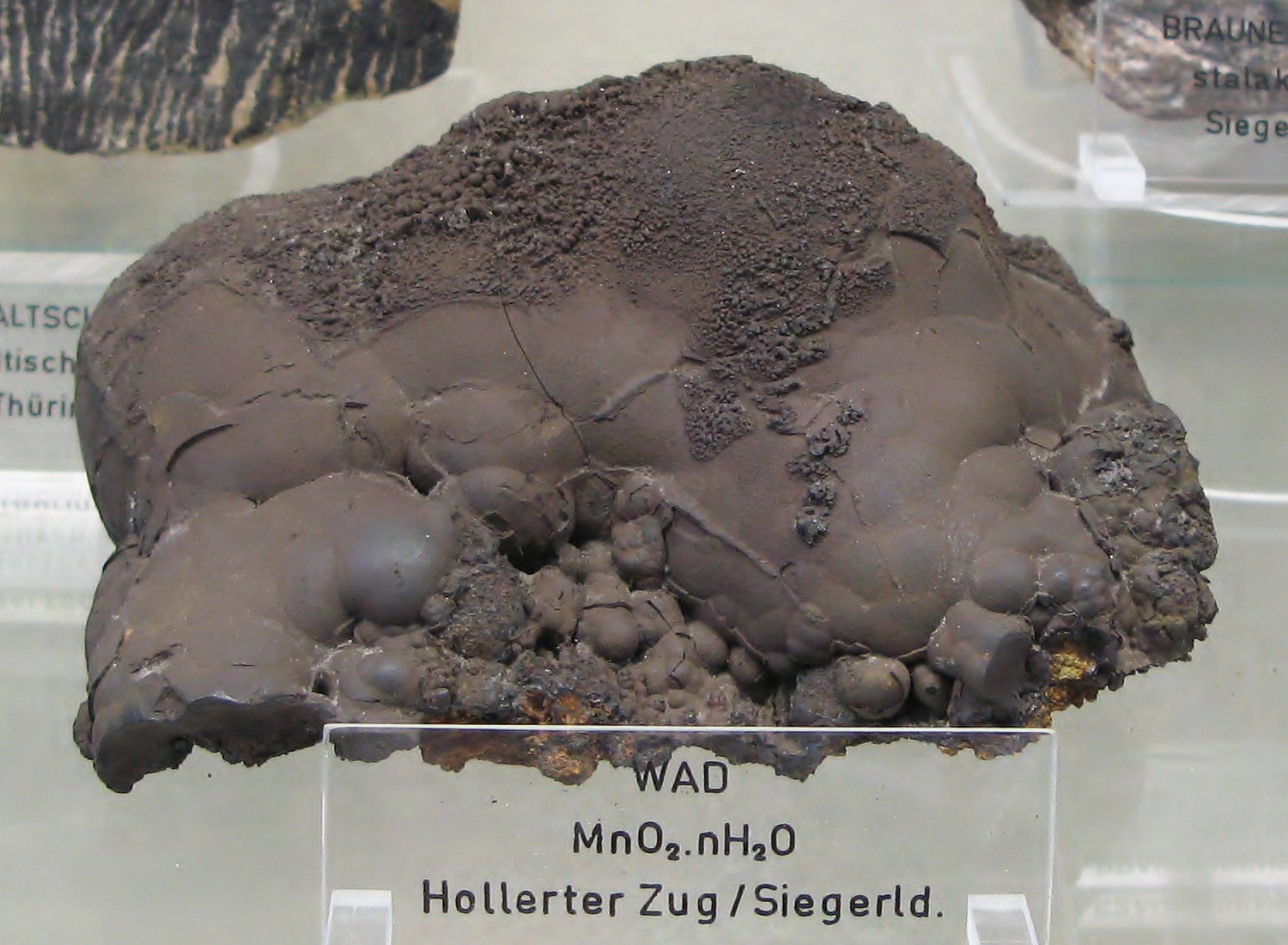
- Earthy manganese or wad

General
- Category: Oxide minerals
- Formula: Mn^{4+}_{1−x}Mn^{2+}_{x}O_{2-2x}(OH)_{2x} where x = 0.06–0.07
- IMA symbol: Nsu
- Strunz classification: 4.DB.15c
- Crystal system: Hexagonal; Unknown space group

Identification

Nsutite is a manganese oxide mineral with formula: (Mn^{4+}_{1−x}Mn^{2+}_{x}O_{2-2x}(OH)_{2x} where x = 0.06–0.07). It is found in most large manganese deposits and was first discovered in Nsuta, Ghana. Since then, it has been found worldwide. Nsutite is a dull mineral with a hardness of 6.5–8.5 and an average specific gravity of 4.45. Nsutite has been used as a cathode in zinc–carbon batteries, but synthetic manganese oxide is gradually replacing it.
