= Metamictisation =

Natural process occurring on minerals

Metamictisation (sometimes called metamictization or metamiction) is a natural process resulting in the gradual and ultimately complete destruction of a mineral's crystal structure, leaving the mineral amorphous. The affected material is therefore described as metamict.

Certain minerals occasionally contain interstitial impurities of radioactive elements, and it is the alpha radiation emitted from those compounds that is responsible for degrading a mineral's crystal structure through internal bombardment. The effects of metamictisation are extensive: other than negating any birefringence previously present, the process also lowers a mineral's refractive index, hardness, and its specific gravity. The mineral's colour is also affected: metamict specimens are usually green, brown or blackish. Further, metamictisation diffuses the bands of a mineral's absorption spectrum. Inexplicably, the one attribute which metamictisation does not alter is dispersion. All metamict materials are themselves radioactive, some dangerously so.

An example of a metamict mineral is zircon. The presence of uranium and thorium atoms substituting for zirconium in the crystal structure is responsible for the radiation damage in this case. Unaffected specimens are termed high zircon while metamict specimens are termed low zircon. Other minerals known to undergo metamictisation include allanite, gadolinite, ekanite, thorite and titanite. Ekanite is almost invariably found completely metamict as thorium and uranium are part of its essential chemical composition.

Metamict minerals can have their crystallinity and properties restored through prolonged annealing.

A related phenomenon is the formation of pleochroic halos surrounding minute zircon inclusions within a crystal of biotite or other mineral. The spherical halos are produced by alpha particle radiation from the included uranium- or thorium-bearing species. Such halos can also be found surrounding monazite and other radioactive minerals.

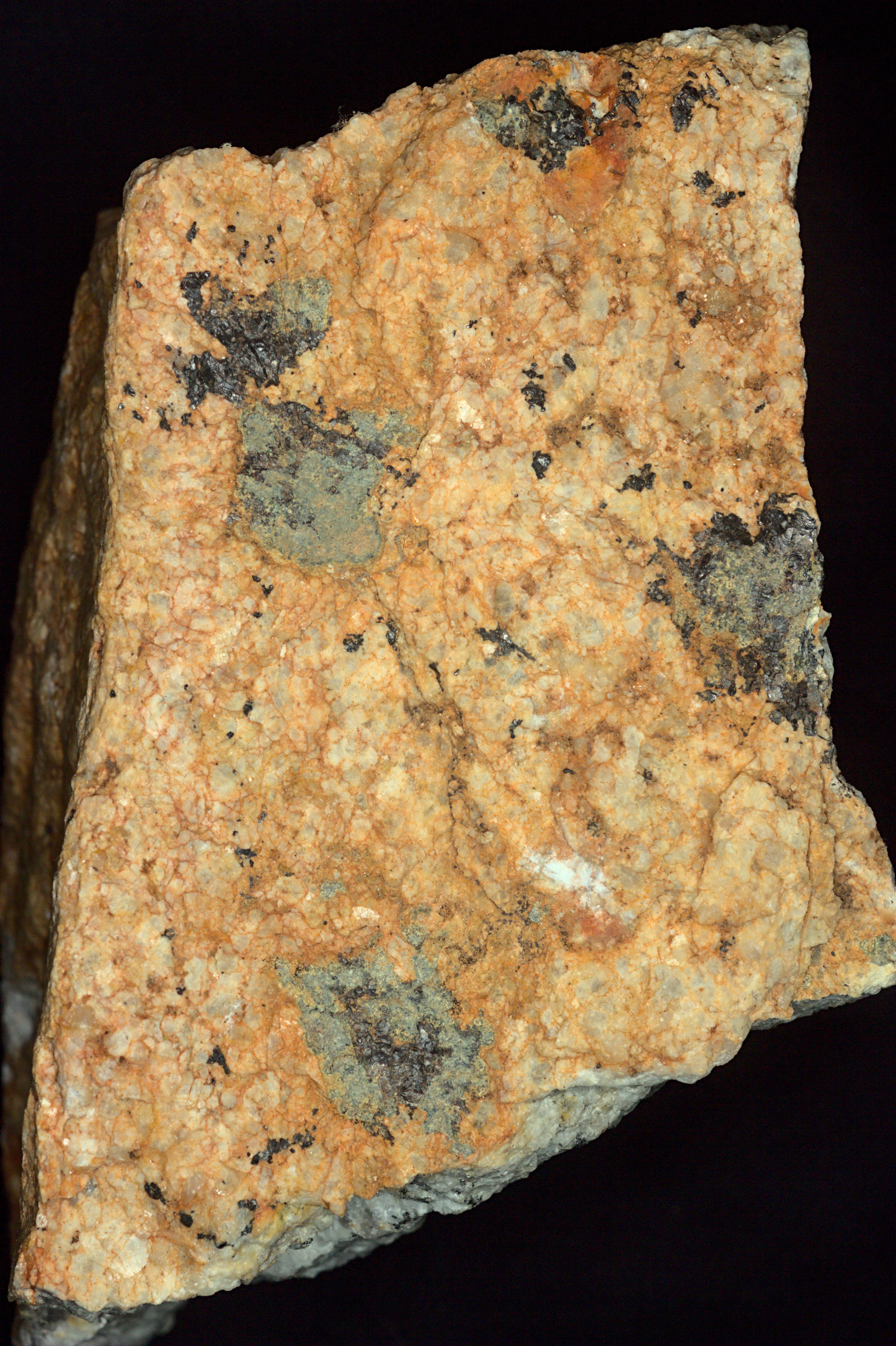
Metamict grey-black Th-uranitite (or possibly davidite) on granitic gneiss from Crokers Well, Olary, South Australia

== See also ==
- Titanium in zircon geothermometer
