= List of minerals recognized by the International Mineralogical Association (F) =

This list includes those recognised minerals beginning with the letter F. The International Mineralogical Association is the international group that recognises new minerals and new mineral names; however, minerals discovered before 1959 did not go through the official naming procedure, although some minerals published previously have been either confirmed or discredited since that date. This list contains a mixture of mineral names that have been approved since 1959 and those mineral names believed to still refer to valid mineral species (these are called "grandfathered" species).

The list is divided into groups:

- Introduction • (Main synonyms)
- A • B • C • D • E • F • G • H • I • J • K • L • M • N • O • P–Q • R • S • T • U–V • W–X • Y–Z

The data was exported from mindat.org on 29 April 2005; updated up to 'IMA2021'.

The minerals are sorted by name, followed by the structural group (rruff.info/ima and ima-cnmnc by mineralienatlas.de, mainly) or chemical class (mindat.org and basics), the year of publication (if it's before of an IMA approval procedure), the IMA approval and the Strunz-mindat code. The first link is to mindat.org, the second link is to webmineral.com, and the third is to the Handbook of Mineralogy (Mineralogical Society of America).

- Abbreviations:
  - ^{D} – discredited (IMA/CNMNC status).
  - ^{Q} – questionable/ doubtful (IMA/CNMNC, mindat.org or mineralienatlas.de status).
  - ^{N} – published without approval of the IMA/CNMNC, or just not an IMA approved mineral but with some acceptance in the scientific community nowadays.
  - ^{I} – intermediate member of a solid-solution series.
  - ^{H} – hypothetical mineral (synthetic, anthropogenic, suspended approval procedure, etc.)
    - ^{ch} – incomplete description, hypothetical solid solution end member.
  - Rd – redefinition of ...
  - "s.p." – special procedure.
  - group – a name used to designate a group of species, sometimes only a mineral group name.
  - no – no link available.
  - IUPAC – chemical name.
  - Y: NNNN – year of publication.
  - Y: old – known before publications were available.

== F ==
=== Fa – Fe ===
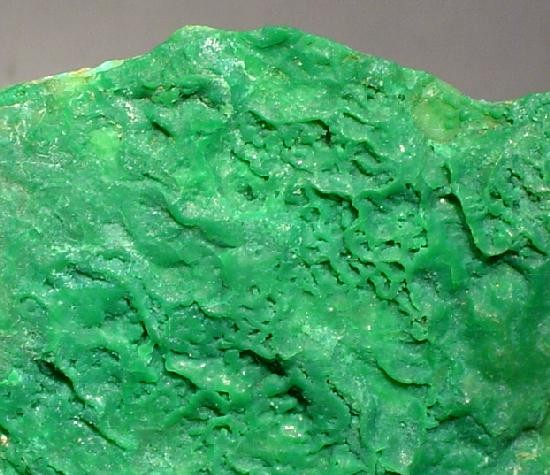
Green falcondoite with a little olive willemseite, rare nickel minerals from Loma Peguera, Bonao, Monseñor Nouel Province, Dominican Republic; size: 4.3 × 3.0 × 0.3 cm

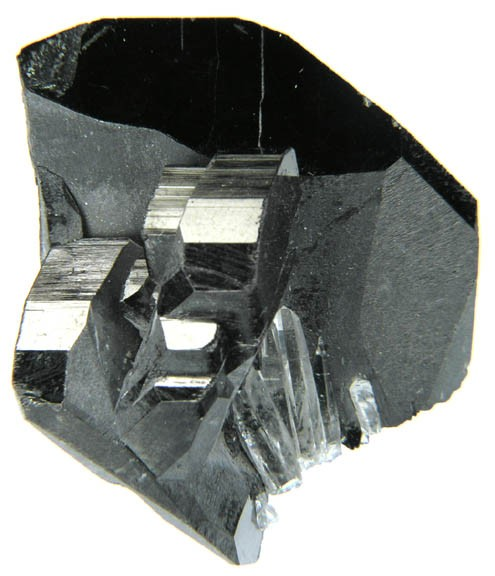
Ferberite on matrix with gemmy quartz, Tazna Mine, Atocha-Quechisla District, Nor Chichas Province, Potosí Department, Bolivia; size: 4.3 × 3.7 × 3.5 cm

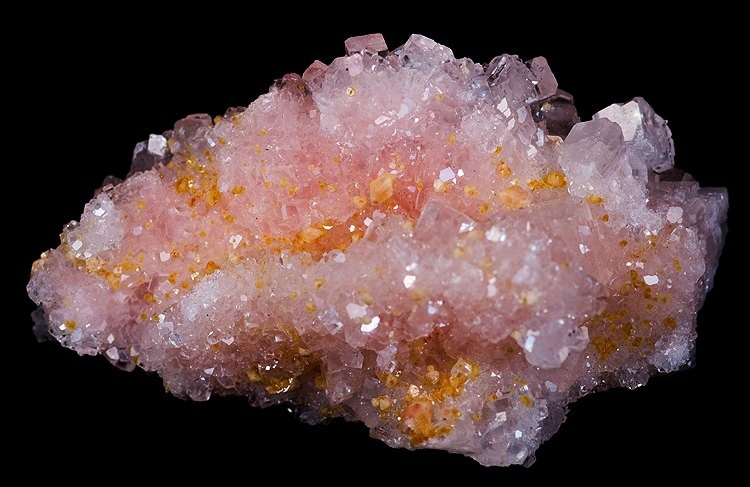
Euhedral, straw-yellow florencite-(Ce) crystals to 5 mm, on clear to pinkish magnesite rhombs; locality: Serra das Éguas, Brumado (Bom Jesus dos Meiras), Bahia, Brazil; size: 7.4 × 4.4 × 4.0 cm

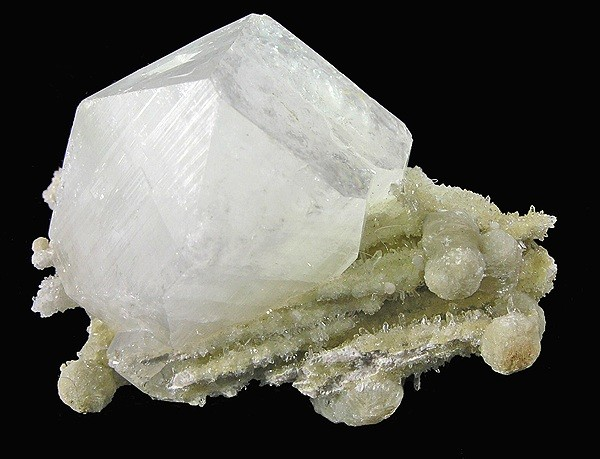
Colorless fluorapophyllite sits atop a natural base of light pea-green gyrolite that has formed balls intermixed with gemmy little fluorapophyllites

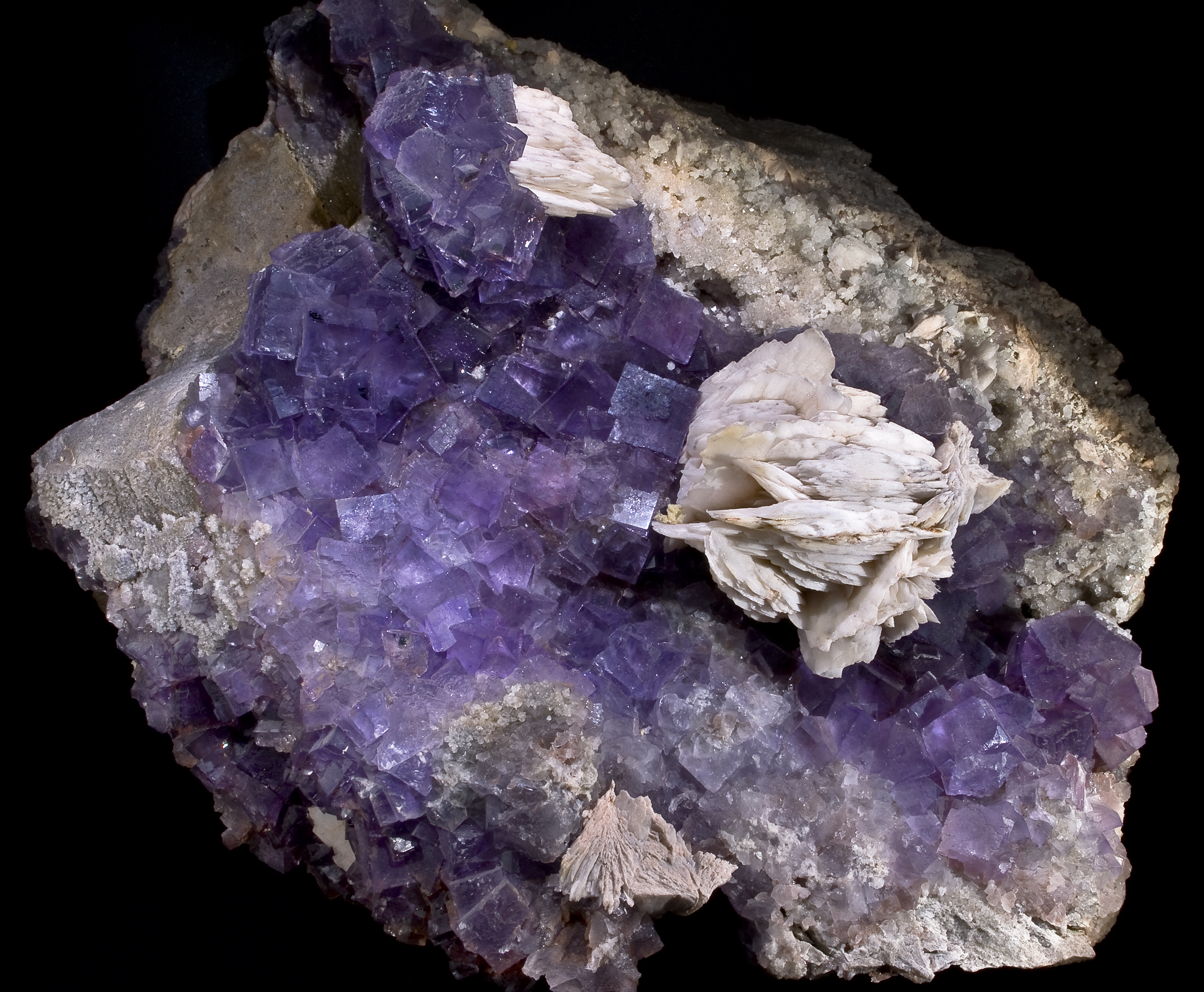
Fluorite with baryte, from Berbes Mine, Berbes Mining area, Ribadesella, Asturias, Spain

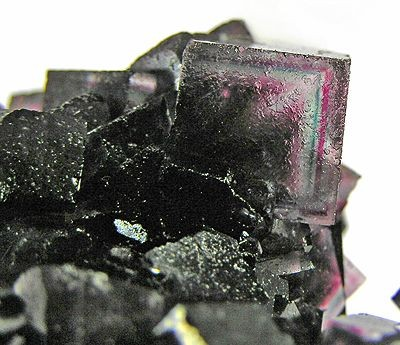
Fluorite plates, Okorusu Mine, Otjiwarongo District, Otjozondjupa Region, Namibia; size: 12.9 × 10.4 × 4.9 cm

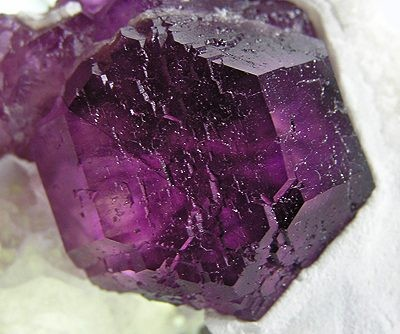
Gemmy purple fluorite from Wushan Fluorite mine, De'an County, Jiujiang Prefecture, Jiangxi Province, China; size: 6.2 × 4.2 × 3.9 cm

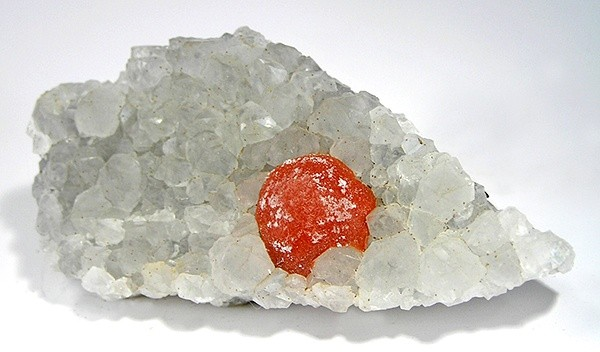
Rare red fluorite (1.4 cm) on quartz, which in turn is peppered with tiny balls of gyrolite; Mahodari, Nasik District, Maharashtra, India; overall size: 7.4 × 3.6 × 2.9 cm

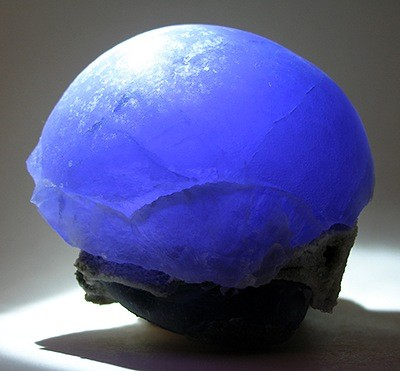
Blue fluorite "cap" on matrix, Minggang Fluorite mine, Shihe District, Xinyang Prefecture, Henan Province, China; size: 6.0 × 6.0 × 5.8 cm

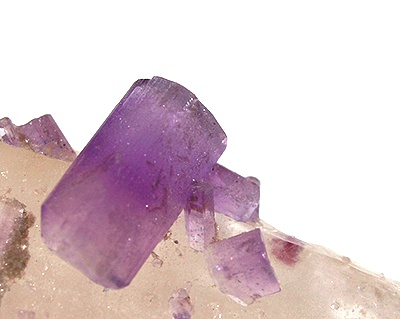
Fluorapatite on quartz, largest crystal is about 1 cm; Lavra do Pederneira, Minas Gerais, Brazil

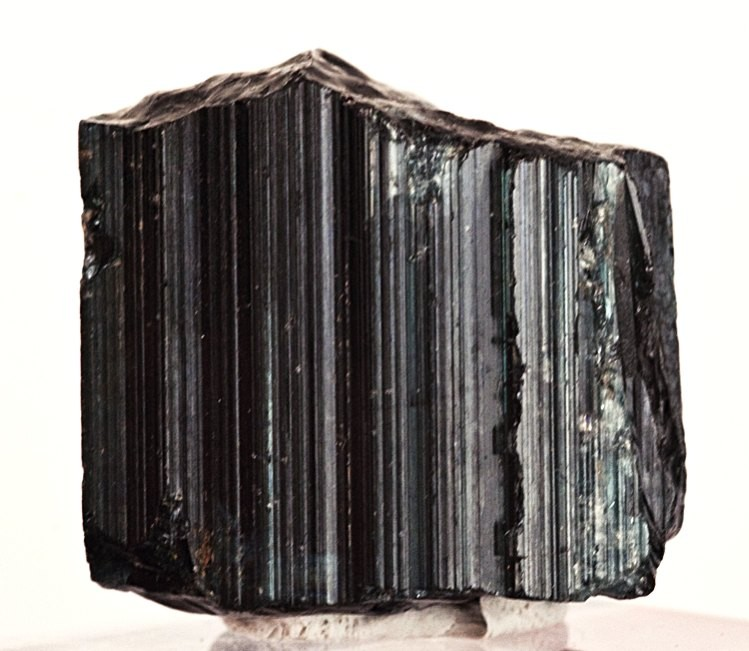
Foitite, Mt. Mica Quarry, Paris, Maine US; size: 1.9 × 1.7 × 1.2 cm

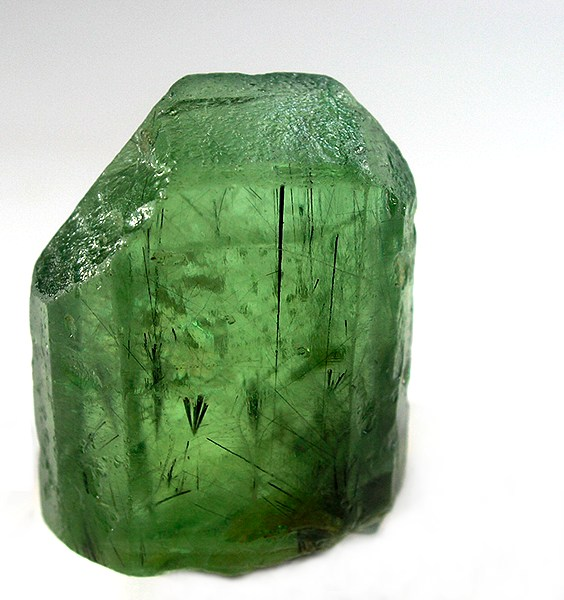
Forsterite with inclusions of ludwigite, Sapat Gali, Kohistan District, North-West Frontier Province, Pakistan; 2.8 × 2 × 1.1 cm

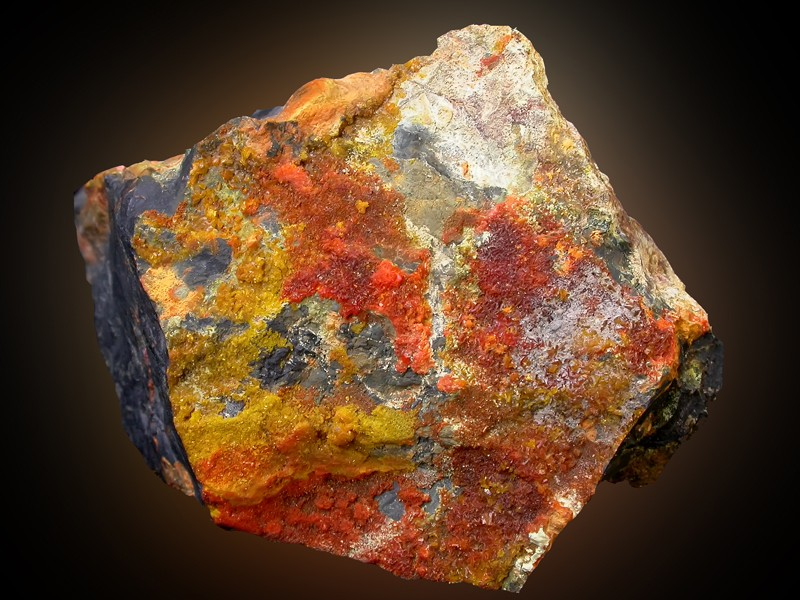
Fourmarierite (red-orange) and becquerelite (yellow) on uraninite (black), from the Shinkolobwe mine, Katanga province, Democratic Republic of the Congo; size: 5 x 5 x 4 cm

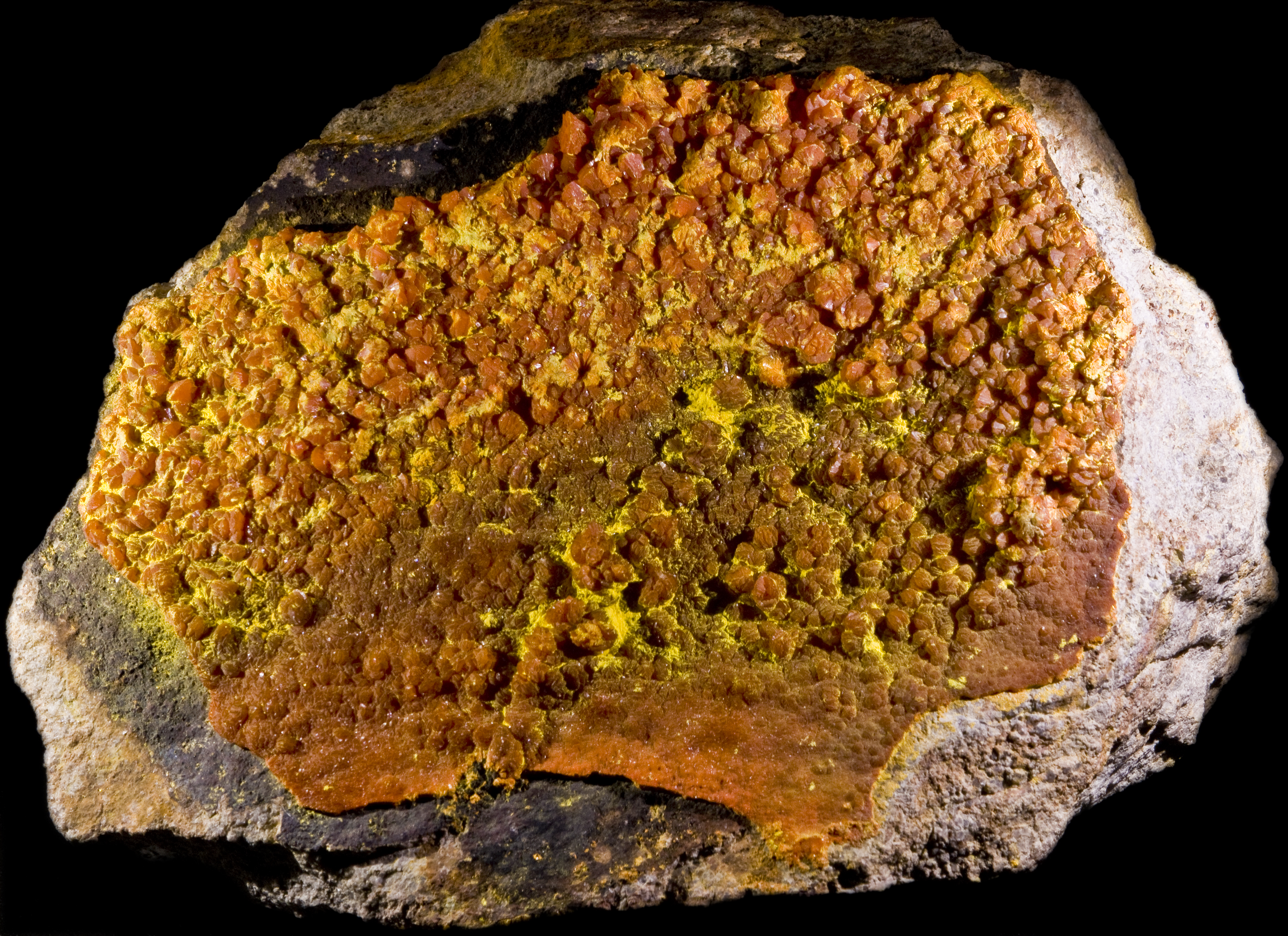
Francevillite with curienite, from Mounana Mine, Franceville, Haut-Ogooué, Gabon

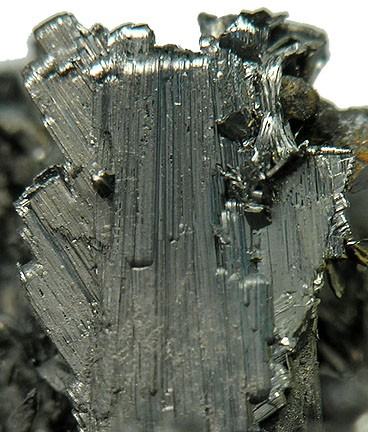
Franckeite var. potosíite, San José Mine, Cercado Province, Bolivia; field of view about 0.7 cm

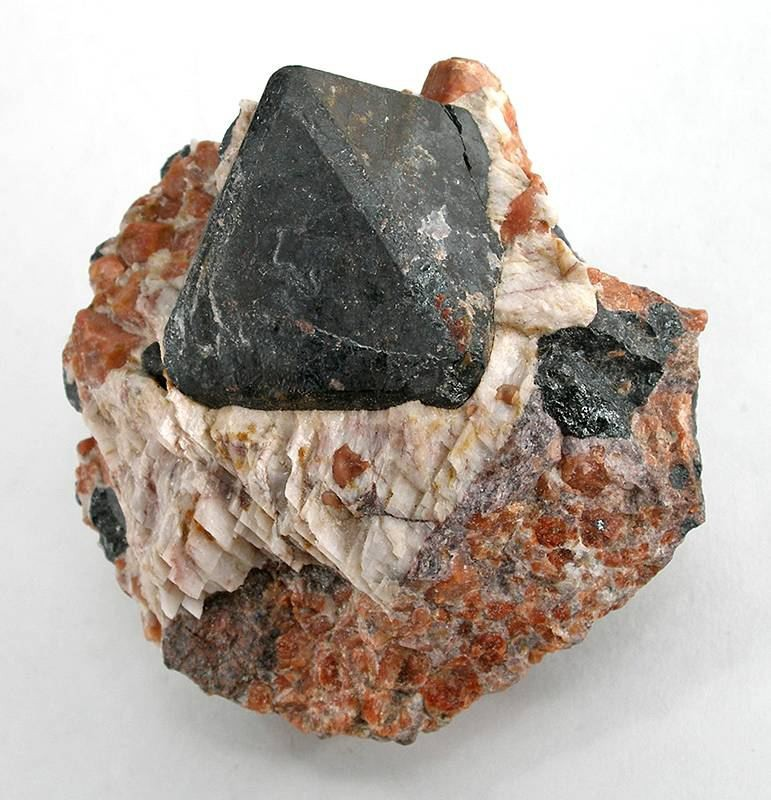
Franklinite sitting in matrix of zincite, willemite, and calcite

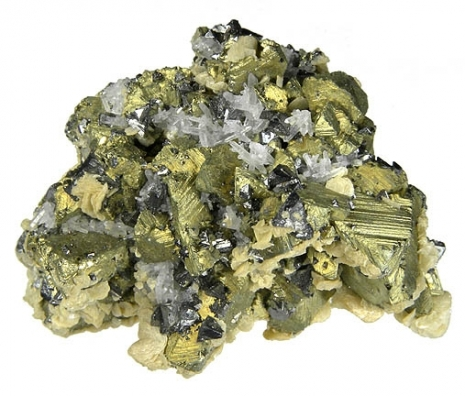
Dark-gray tetrahedra of freibergite with golden chalcopyrite, from the Eagle Mine, Gilman, Colorado, US; size: 4.6 × 3.7 × 3.1 cm

1. Fabianite (IMA1967 s.p., 1962) 6.FC.20
  (CaB_{3}O_{5}(OH))
2. Fabrièsite (zeolitic tectosilicate: IMA2012-080) 9.G?. [no]
3. Faheyite (Y: 1953) 8.CA.15
  (IUPAC: diberyllium manganese(II) diiron(III) tetraphosphate hexahydrate)
4. Fahleite (smolianinovite: IMA1982-061) 8.CH.55
  (IUPAC: calcium pentazinc diiron(III) hexarsenate tetradecahydrate)
5. Fairbankite (tellurite: IMA1979-003) 4.JK.50
  (IUPAC: lead tellurite)
6. Fairchildite (fairchildite: 1947) 5.AC.20
  (IUPAC: dipotassium calcium dicarbonate)
7. Fairfieldite (fairfieldite: 1879) 8.CG.05
  (IUPAC: dicalcium manganese(II) diphosphate dihydrate)
8. Faizievite (IMA2006-037) 9.CM.10
9. Falcondoite (sepiolite: IMA1976-018) 9.EE.25
10. Falgarite (IMA2018-069) 7.0 [no] [no]
  (IUPAC: tetrapotassium trivanadyl pentasulfate)
11. Falkmanite (Y: 1940) 2.HC.15 [no]
  (IUPAC: trilead diantimonide hexasulfide)
  Note: possibly a lead-rich variety of boulangerite.
12. Falottaite (IMA2013-044) 10.AB. [no] [no]
  (IUPAC: manganese oxalate trihydrate)
13. Falsterite (IMA2011-061) 8.0 [no] [no]
14. Famatinite (stannite: 1873) 2.KA.10
  (IUPAC: tricopper antimonide tetrasulfide)
15. Fanfaniite (calcioferrite: IMA2018-053) 8.0 [no] [no]
  (IUPAC: tetracalcium manganese tetraluminium tetrahydro hexaphosphate dodecahydrate)
16. Fangite (IMA1991-047) 2.KA.15
  (IUPAC: trithallium arsenide tetrasulfide)
17. Fantappièite (cancrinite: IMA2008-006) 9.FB.05 [no] [no]
18. Farneseite (cancrinite-sodalite: IMA2004-043) 9.FB.05
19. Farringtonite (IMA1967 s.p., 1961) 8.AB.05
  (IUPAC: trimagnesium diphosphate)
20. Fassinaite (thiosulphate: IMA2011-048) 7.0 [no]
  (IUPAC: dilead carbonate thiosulphate)
21. Faujasite (zeolitic tectosilicate) 9.GD.30
  1. Faujasite-Ca (IMA1997 s.p., 1982) 9.GD.30 [no]
  2. Faujasite-Mg (IMA1997 s.p., 1975) 9.GD.30 [no]
  3. Faujasite-Na (IMA1997 s.p., 1842) 9.GD.30
22. Faustite (Y: 1953) 8.DD.15
  (IUPAC: zinc hexaluminium octahydro tetraphosphate tetrahydrate)
23. Favreauite (IMA2014-013) 4.0 [no] [no]
  (PbBiCu_{6}O_{4}(SeO_{3})_{4}(OH)·H_{2}O)
24. Fayalite (olivine: 1840) 9.AC.05
  (IUPAC: diiron(II) (tetraoxo silicate))
25. Fedorite (gyrolite: IMA1967 s.p., 1965) 9.EE.80
26. Fedorovskite (IMA1975-006) 6.DA.25
  (Ca_{2}Mg_{2}B_{4}O_{7}(OH)_{6})
27. Fedotovite (IMA1986-013) 7.BC.30
  (IUPAC: dipotassium tricopper oxotrisulfate)
28. Fehrite (knetasite: IMA2018-125a) 7.0 [no] [no]
29. Feiite (IMA2017-041a) 4.0 [no] [no]
  (IUPAC: diiron(II) (iron(II) titanium(IV)) pentaoxide)
30. Feinglosite (brackebuschite: IMA1995-013) 8.BG.05
  (IUPAC: dilead zinc diarsenate monohydrate)
31. Feitknechtite ("O(OH)" group: IMA1968 s.p., 1965) 4.FE.25
  (IUPAC: hydromanganese(III) oxide)
32. Feklichevite (eudialyte: IMA2000-017) 9.CO.10 [no]
33. Felbertalite (IMA1999-042) 2.JB.25b
  (Cu_{2}Pb_{6}Bi_{8}S_{19})
34. Felsőbányaite (Y: 1854) 7.DD.05
  (IUPAC: tetraluminium decahydro sulfate tetrahydrate)
35. Fenaksite (litidionite: IMA1962 s.p., 1959) 9.DG.70
  (IUPAC: potassium sodium iron(II) decaoxo tetrasilicate)
36. Fencooperite (IMA2000-023) 9.BH.20 [no]
37. Fengchengite (eudialyte: IMA2007-018a) 9.CO. [no] [no]
38. Feodosiyite (IMA2015-063) 3.0 [no] [no]
  (IUPAC: undecacopper dimagnesium octadecachloride octahydro hexadecahydrate)
39. Ferberite (wolframite: 1863) 4.DB.30
  (IUPAC: iron(II) tungstate)
40. Ferchromide (alloy: IMA1984-022) 1.AE.15
  (Cr_{1.5}Fe_{0.2})
41. Ferdowsiite (sulfosalt: IMA2012-062) 2.0 [no] [no]
  (IUPAC: octasilver (pentaantimonide triarsenide) hexadecasulfide)
42. Fergusonite-(REE) series (scheelite) 7.GA.05
  1. Fergusonite-(Ce)^{Q} (1986) 7.GA.05
    (IUPAC: cerium niobate (0.3)hydrate)
  2. Fergusonite-(Nd)^{N} (1989) 7.GA.05
  3. Fergusonite-(Y) (IMA1987 s.p., 1825) 7.GA.05
    (IUPAC: yttrium niobate)
43. Fergusonite-(REE)-beta series 4.DG.10
  (IUPAC: REE niobium tetraoxide)
  1. Fergusonite-(Ce)-beta (IMA1975 s.p., 1973 Rn) 4.DG.10
  2. Fergusonite-(Nd)-beta (IMA1987 s.p., 1983) 4.DG.10
  3. Fergusonite-(Y)-beta (IMA1987 s.p., 1961) 4.DG.10
44. Ferhodsite^{Q} (pentlandite: IMA2009-056) 2.0 [no] [no]
  Note: possibly a distorted pentlandite derivative.
45. Fermiite (IMA2014-068) 7.0 [no] [no]
  (IUPAC: tetrasodium uranyl trisulfate trihydrate)
46. Fernandinite (straczekite: IMA1994 s.p., 1915 Rd) 4.HE.20
47. Feroxyhyte ("O(OH)" group: IMA1975-032) 4.FE.40
  (IUPAC: hydroiron(III) oxide)
48. Ferraioloite (IMA2015-066) 8.0 [no] [no]
49. Ferrarisite (lindackerite: IMA1979-020) 8.CJ.30
  (IUPAC: pentacalcium di(hydroxoarsenate) diarsenate nonahydrate)
50. Ferriakasakaite (epidote) 9.BG.
  1. Ferriakasakaite-(Ce) (IMA2018-087) 9.BG. [no] [no] [no]
  2. Ferriakasakaite-(La) (IMA2013-126) 9.BG. [no] [no]
51. Ferriallanite (epidote, allanite) 9.BG.05b
  1. Ferriallanite-(Ce) (IMA2000-041) 9.BG.05b [no]
  2. Ferriallanite-(La) (IMA2010-066) 9.BG.05b [no] [no]
52. Ferriandrosite-(La) (epidote: IMA2013-127) 9.B [no] [no]
53. Ferribushmakinite (brackebushite: IMA2014-055) 8.B?. [no] [no]
  (IUPAC: dilead iron(III) hydro phosphate vanadate)
54. Ferricerite-(La) (cerite: IMA2001-042) 9.AG.20 [no]
55. Ferricopiapite (copiapite: 1939) 7.DB.35
56. Ferricoronadite (hollandite, coronadite: IMA2015-093) 4.DK. [no] [no]
  (Pb(Mn^{4+}_{6}Fe^{3+}_{2})O_{16})
57. Ferrierite (zeolitic tectosilicate) 9.GD.50
  1. Ferrierite-K (IMA1997 s.p., 1976) 9.GD.50 [no]
  2. Ferrierite-Mg (IMA1997 s.p., 1918) 9.GD.50 [no]
  3. Ferrierite-Na (IMA1997 s.p., 1976) 9.GD.50
  4. Ferrierite-NH4 (IMA2017-099) 9.GD.50 [no] [no]
58. Ferri-fluoro-katophorite [Na-Ca-amphibole: IMA2015-096, IMA2012 s.p., fluor-magnesiokatophorite (2006) Rd] 9.DE.20 [no] [no]
59. Ferri-fluoro-leakeite [Na-amphibole: IMA2012 s.p., fluoroleakeite (IMA2009-085) Rd] 9.DE.05 [no]
60. Ferri-ghoseite [Na-(Mg-Fe-Mn)-amphibole: IMA2012 s.p., IMA2003-066 Rd] 9.DE.20 [no]
61. Ferri-hellandite-(Ce) (hellandite: IMA2020-085) 9.DK. [no] [no]
62. Ferrihollandite (hollandite, coronadite: IMA2011-F, 1906) 4.DK. [no] [no]
  (Ba(Mn^{4+}_{6}Fe^{3+}_{2})O_{16})
63. Ferrihydrite (nolanite: IMA1971-015) 4.FE.35
  (IUPAC: decairon(III) dihydro tetradecaoxide)
64. Ferri-kaersutite [O-dominant amphibole: IMA2014-051] 9.DE.15 [no] [no]
65. Ferri-katophorite [Na-Ca-amphibole: IMA2012 s.p., IMA1978 s.p. Rd] 9.DE.20 [no] [no]
66. Ferri-leakeite [Na-amphibole: IMA2012 s.p., leakeite (IMA1991-028) Rd] 9.DE.25
67. Ferrilotharmeyerite (tsumcorite: IMA1986-024) 8.CG.15
  (IUPAC: calcium zinc iron(III) hydro diarsenate hydrate)
68. Ferrimolybdite (Y: 1907) 7.GB.30
  (IUPAC: diiron trimolybdate(VI) heptahydrate)
69. Ferri-mottanaite-(Ce) (hellandite: IMA2017-087a) 9.0 [no] [no]
70. Ferrinatrite (Y: 1889) 7.CC.35
  (IUPAC: trisodium iron(III) trisulfate trihydrate)
71. Ferri-obertiite [O-dominant amphibole: IMA2015-079] 9.DE.25 [no] [no]
72. Ferri-pedrizite [Li-amphibole: IMA2012 s.p., ferripedrizite (IMA1998-061) Rd] 9.DE.25 [no]
73. Ferriperbøeite (gatelite) 9.BG.
  1. Ferriperbøeite-(Ce) (IMA2017-037) 9.BG. [no] [no]
  2. Ferriperbøeite-(La) (IMA2018-106) 9.BG. [no] [no]
74. Ferriprehnite (prehnite: IMA2020-057) 9.0 [no] [no]
75. Ferripyrophyllite (IMA1978-062) 9.EC.10
  (IUPAC: iron(III) hydropentaoxy disilicate)
76. Ferrirockbridgeite (rockbridgeite: IMA2018-065) 8.BC. [no] [no]
77. Ferrisanidine (feldspar: IMA2019-052) 9.F [no] [no]
78. Ferrisepiolite (sepiolite: IMA2010-061) 9.EE. [no]
79. Ferrisicklerite (olivine: 1937) 8.AB.10
  (IUPAC: (1-x)lithium (iron(III),Mn(II)) phosphate)
80. Ferristrunzite (strunzite: IMA1986-023) 8.DC.25
  (IUPAC: triiron(III) trihydro diphosphate pentahydrate)
81. Ferrisurite (surite: IMA1990-056) 9.EC.75
82. Ferrisymplesite^{Q} (symplesite: 1924) 8.CE.40
  (IUPAC: triiron(III) trihydro diarsenate pentahydrate)
83. Ferri-taramite (Na-Ca-amphibole: IMA2021-046) 9.DE.20 [no] [no]
84. Ferrivauxite (vauxite: IMA2014-003) 8.0 [no] [no]
  (IUPAC: iron(III) dialuminium trihydro diphosphate pentahydrate)
85. Ferri-winchite [Na-Ca-amphibole: IMA2012 s.p., ferriwinchite (IMA2004-034) Rd] 9.DE.20
86. Ferro-actinolite [Ca-amphibole: IMA2012 s.p., IMA1997 s.p., 1946 Rd] 9.DE.10
87. Ferroalluaudite (alluaudite: IMA2007 s.p., 1957) 8.AC.10
  (IUPAC: sodium iron(II) diiron(III) triphosphate)
88. Ferroaluminoceladonite (mica: IMA1995-019) 9.EC.15 [no]
89. Ferro-anthophyllite [Mg-Fe-Mn-amphibole: IMA2012 s.p., 1921 Rd] 9.DD.05 [no]
90. Ferroberaunite (beraunite: IMA2021-036) 8.DH. [no] [no]
91. Ferrobobfergusonite (alluaudite, bobfergusonite: IMA2017-006) 8.0 [no] [no]
  (IUPAC: disodium pentairon(II) iron(III) aluminium hexaphosphate)
92. Ferrobustamite (wollastonite: 1937) 9.DG.05
  (IUPAC: calcium iron(II) hexaoxy disilicate)
93. Ferrocarpholite (carpholite: 1951) 9.DB.05
  (IUPAC: iron(II) dialuminium hexaoxy disilicate tetrahydroxyl)
94. Ferroceladonite (mica: IMA1995-018) 9.EC.15 [no]
95. Ferrochiavennite (zeolitic tectosilicate: IMA2012-039) 9.G?. [no]
96. Ferro-edenite [Ca-amphibole: IMA2012 s.p., 1946 Rd] 9.DE.15
97. Ferroefremovite (langbeinite: IMA2019-008) 7.0 [no] [no]
  (IUPAC: diammonium diiron(II) trisulfate)
98. Ferroericssonite (ericssonite: IMA2010-025) 9.B [no] [no]
  (IUPAC: barium diiron(II) iron(III) (heptaoxy disilicate) oxyhydroxyl)
99. Ferro-ferri-fluoro-leakeite [Na-amphibole: IMA2012 s.p., fluor-ferro-leakeite (IMA1993-026) Rd] 9.DE.25 [no]
100. Ferro-ferri-hornblende [Li-amphibole: IMA2015-054] 9.DE.10 [no] [no]
101. Ferro-ferri-katophorite [Na-Ca-amphibole: IMA2016-008] 9.DE.20 [no] [no]
102. Ferro-ferri-nybøite [Na-amphibole: IMA2013-072, IMA1997 s.p.] 9.DE.25 [no] [no]
103. Ferro-ferri-obertiite [O-dominant amphibole: IMA2012 s.p., ferro-obertiite (IMA2009-034) Rd] 9.DE.25 [no]
104. Ferro-ferri-pedrizite [Li-amphibole: IMA2012 s.p., sodic-ferri-ferropedrizite (2003) Rd] 9.DE.25 [no]
105. Ferrofettelite (IMA2021-094)
106. Ferro-fluoro-edenite [Ca-amphibole: IMA2020-058] 9.DE. [no] [no]
107. Ferro-fluoro-pedrizite [Li-amphibole: IMA2012 s.p., fluoro-sodic-ferropedrizite (IMA2008-070) Rd] 9.DE.25 [no]
108. Ferro-gedrite [Mg-Fe-Mn-amphibole: IMA2012 s.p., ferrogedrite (IMA1997 s.p.), IMA1978 s.p., 1939 Rd] 9.DD.05
109. Ferro-glaucophane [Na-amphibole: IMA2012 s.p., ferroglaucophane (IMA1997 s.p.), 1957 Rd] 9.DE.25
110. Ferrohexahydrite (IMA1967 s.p., 1962) 7.CB.25
  (IUPAC: iron(II) sulfate hexahydrate)
111. Ferrohögbomite-2N2S (högbomite, ferrohögbomite: IMA2001-048) 4.CB. [no]
112. Ferro-holmquistite [Li-amphibole: IMA2012 s.p., ferroholmquistite (IMA2004-030) Rd] 9.DD.05 [no]
113. Ferro-hornblende [Ca-amphibole: IMA2012 s.p., ferrohornblende (IMA1997 s.p.), ferro-hornblende (1978) Rd] 9.DE.10
114. Ferroindialite (beryl: IMA2013-016) 9.CJ. [no]
115. Ferro-katophorite [Na-Ca-amphibole: IMA2012 s.p., katophorite (1894) Rd] 9.DE.20
116. Ferrokentbrooksite (eudialyte: IMA1999-046) 9.CO.10 [no]
117. Ferrokësterite (stannite: IMA1985-012) 2.CB.15a
118. Ferrokinoshitalite (IMA1999-026) 9.EC.35 [no]
119. Ferrolaueite (laueite, laueite: IMA1987-046a) 8.DC.30 [no]
120. Ferromerrillite (whitlockite: IMA2006-039) 8.AC.45 [no]
121. Ferronickelplatinum (alloy: IMA1982-071) 1.AG.40
  (IUPAC: diplatinum iron nickel alloy)
122. Ferronigerite (nigerite, ferronigerite) 4.FC.20
  1. Ferronigerite-2N1S (IMA2001 s.p., 1947) 4.FC.20
  2. Ferronigerite-6N6S (IMA2001 s.p., 1947) 4.FC.20
123. Ferronordite (nordite) 9.DO.15
  1. Ferronordite-(Ce) (IMA1997-008) 9.DO.15 [no]
  2. Ferronordite-(La) (IMA2000-015) 9.DO.15 [no]
124. Ferro-pargasite [Ca-amphibole: IMA2012 s.p., ferropargasite (IMA1977 s.p.), 1961 Rd] 9.DE.15
125. Ferro-pedrizite [Ca-amphibole: IMA2014-037] 9.DE.25 [no] [no]
126. Ferroqingheiite-(Fe2+) (alluaudite, wyllieite: IMA2009-076) 8.AC.15 [no]
  (IUPAC: disodium iron(II) magnesium aluminium triphosphate)
127. Ferrorhodonite (rhodonite: IMA2016-016) 9.D? [no] [no]
128. Ferro-richterite [Na-Ca-amphibole: IMA2012 s.p., ferrorichterite (IMA1997 s.p.), 1946 Rd] 9.DE.20
129. Ferrorockbridgeite (rockbridgeite: IMA2018-004) 8.0 [no] [no]
130. Ferrorosemaryite (alluaudite, wyllieite: IMA2003-063) 8.AC.15
  (IUPAC: vacancy sodium iron(II) (iron(III) aluminium) triphosphate)
131. Ferrosaponite (smectite-vermiculite: IMA2002-028) 9.EC.45 [no]
132. Ferroselite (marcasite: 1955) 2.EB.10a
  (IUPAC: iron diselenide)
133. Ferrosilite (pyroxene: IMA1988 s.p., 1935) 9.DA.05
  (IUPAC: iron(II) hexaoxy disilicate)
134. Ferroskutterudite (perovskite, skutterudite: IMA2006-032) 2.EC.05
135. Ferrostalderite (routhierite: IMA2014-090) 2.0 [no] [no]
  (IUPAC: copper diiron thallium diarsenide hexasulfide)
136. Ferrostrunzite (strunzite: IMA1983-003) 8.DC.25
  (IUPAC: iron(II) diiron(III) dihydro diphosphate hexahydrate)
137. Ferrotaaffeite (taaffeite, ferrotaaffeite) 4.FC.
  1. Ferrotaaffeite-2N'2S (IMA2011-025) 4.FC. [no]
  2. Ferrotaaffeite-6N'3S (IMA2001 s.p., IMA1979-047) 4.FC.
    (IUPAC: beryllium diiron(II) hexaluminium dodecaoxide)
138. Ferro-taramite [Na-Ca-amphibole: IMA2012 s.p., aluminotaramite (IMA2006-023) Rd] 9.DE.20 [no]
139. Ferrotitanowodginite (wodginite: IMA1998-028) 4.DB.40 [no]
  (IUPAC: iron(II) titanium ditantalum octaoxide)
140. Ferrotochilinite (tochilinite: IMA2010-080) 2.0 [no]
  (circa 6FeS·5[Fe(OH)_{2}])
141. Ferrotorryweiserite (torryweiserite: IMA2021-055) [no] [no]
142. Ferro-tschermakite (IMA2016-116, 1945) 9.DE.10
143. Ferrotychite (northupite: IMA1980-050) 5.BF.05
  (IUPAC: hexasodium diiron(II) tetracarbonate sulfate)
144. Ferrovalleriite (valleriite: IMA2011-068) 2.0 [no]
  (2[(Fe,Cu)S]·1.53[(Fe,Al,Mg)(OH)_{2}])
145. Ferrovorontsovite (galkhaite: IMA2017-007) 2.0 [no] [no]
  ((Fe_{5}Cu)TlAs_{4}S_{12})
146. Ferrowodginite (wodginite: IMA1984-006) 4.DB.40
  (IUPAC: iron(II) tin(IV) ditantalum octaoxide)
147. Ferrowyllieite (alluaudite, wyllieite: IMA1979 s.p., 1973) 8.AC.15
  (IUPAC: sodium sodium iron(II) (iron(II) aluminium) triphosphate)
148. Ferruccite (fluoroborate: 1933) 3.CA.05
  (IUPAC: sodium tetrafluoroborate)
149. Fersmanite (Y: 1929) 9.BE.72
150. Fersmite (columbite: 1946) 4.DG.05
151. Feruvite (tourmaline: IMA1987-057) 9.CK.05
152. Fervanite (Y: 1931) 4.HG.05
  (IUPAC: tetrairon(III) tetravanadium(V) hexadecaoxide pentahydrate)
153. Fetiasite (IMA1991-019) 4.JB.05
154. Fettelite (IMA1994-056) 2.LA.30
  ([Ag_{6}As_{2}S_{7}][Ag_{10}HgAs_{2}S_{8}])
155. Feynmanite (IMA2017-035) 7.0 [no] [no]
  (IUPAC: sodium uranyl hydro sulfate (3.5)hydrate)

=== Fi – Fl ===
1. Fianelite (fianelite: IMA1995-016) 8.FC.05
  (IUPAC: dimanganese(II) pyrovanadate dihydrate)
2. Fibroferrite (Y: 1833) 7.DC.15
  (IUPAC: iron(III) hydro sulfate pentahydrate)
3. Fichtelite (Y: 1841) 10.BA.05
  (IUPAC: dimethyl-isopropyl-perhydrophenanthrene)
4. Fiedlerite (IMA1994 s.p., 1887 Rd) 3.DC.10
  (IUPAC: trilead hydro tetrachloride fluoride monohydrate)
5. Fiemmeite (oxalate: IMA2017-115) 10.0 [no] [no]
  (IUPAC: dicopper dihydro oxalate dihydrate)
6. Filatovite (feldspar: IMA2002-052) 8.AC.85
7. Filipstadite (spinel, spinel: IMA1987-010) 04.BB.05
  (IUPAC: 1/2[(iron(III) antimony(V)) tetramagnesium octaoxide])
8. Fillowite (fillowite: 1879) 8.AC.50
  (IUPAC: disodium calcium heptamanganese(II) hexaphosphate)
9. Finchite (fritzscheite: IMA2017-052) 4.0 [no] [no]
  (IUPAC: strontium diuranyl (divanadium octaoxide) pentahydrate)
10. Fingerite (IMA1983-064) 8.BB.80
  (IUPAC: undecacopper dioxohexavanadate)
11. Finnemanite (apatite: 1923) 4.JB.45
  (IUPAC: pentalead chloro triarsenite(III))
12. Fischesserite (IMA1971-010) 2.BA.75
  (IUPAC: trisilver gold diselenide)
13. Fivegite (IMA2009-067) 9.0 [no]
14. Fizélyite (lillianite: 1913) 2.JB.40a
  (IUPAC: pentasilver tetradecalead octatetracontasulfa henicosantimonide)
15. Flaggite (IMA2021-044) 7.DF. [no] [no]
16. Flagstaffite (Y: 1920) 10.CA.10
17. Flamite (IMA2013-122) 9.0 [no] [no]
18. Fleetite (IMA2018-073b) 2.0 [no] [no]
  (IUPAC: dicopper rhenium iridium diantimonide)
19. Fleischerite (fleischerite: IMA1962 s.p.) 7.DF.25
  (IUPAC: trilead germanium hexahydro disulfate trihydrate)
20. Fleisstalite (gravegliaite: IMA2016-038) 4.JE. [no] [no]
  (IUPAC: iron(II) sulfite trihydrate)
21. Fletcherite (linnaeite, spinel: IMA1976-044) 2.DA.05
  (IUPAC: copper dinickel tetrasulfide)
22. Flinkite (allactite: 1889) 8.BE.30
  (IUPAC: dimanganese(II) manganese(III) tetrahydro arsenate)
23. Flinteite (IMA2014-009) 3.0 [no] [no]
  (IUPAC: dipotassium zinc tetrachloride)
24. Florencite (alunite, crandallite) 08.BL.13
  (IUPAC: REE trialumino hexahydro diphosphate)
  1. Florencite-(Ce) (IMA1987 s.p., 1900) 8.BL.13
  2. Florencite-(La) (IMA1987 s.p., 1980) 8.BL.13
  3. Florencite-(Nd) (IMA1987 s.p., 1971) 8.BL.13
  4. Florencite-(Sm) (IMA2009-074) 8.BL.13 [no]
25. Florenskyite (phosphide: IMA1999-013) 1.BD.15 [no]
  (IUPAC: iron titanium phosphide)
26. Florensovite (linnaeite, spinel: IMA1987-012) 2.DA.05
27. Flörkeite (zeolitic tectosilicate: IMA2008-036) 9.GC.10
28. Fluckite (fluckite: IMA1978-054) 8.CB.15
  (IUPAC: calcium manganese(II) di(hydroxoarsenate) dihydrate)
29. Fluellite (Y: 1824) 8.DE.10
  (IUPAC: dialuminium difluoro hydro phosphate heptahydrate)
30. Fluoborite (Y: 1926) 6.AB.50
  (IUPAC: trimagnesium trifluoro borate)
31. Fluocerite 3.AC.15
  (IUPAC: REE trifluoride)
  1. Fluocerite-(Ce) (IMA1987 s.p., 1832) 3.AC.15 [no]
  2. Fluocerite-(La) (IMA1987 s.p., 1969) 3.AC.15
32. Fluorannite (mica: IMA1999-048) 9.EC.20 [no]
  (IUPAC: potassium triiron(II) (alumino trisilicate) decaoxy difluoride)
33. Fluorapatite (apatite: IMA2010 s.p., 1860) 8.BN.05
  (IUPAC: pentacalcium fluoro triphosphate)
34. Fluorapophyllite (apophyllite) 9.EA.15
  1. Fluorapophyllite-(Cs) (IMA2018-108a) 9.EA.15 [no] [no]
  2. Fluorapophyllite-(K) (IMA2013 s.p., IMA1978 s.p., IMA1976-001) 9.EA.15
  3. Fluorapophyllite-(Na) (IMA2013 s.p., IMA1976-032) 9.EA.15
  4. Fluorapophyllite-(NH4) (IMA2019-083) 9.EA. [no] [no]
35. Fluorarrojadite (arrojadite) 8.BF.05
  1. Fluorarrojadite-(BaFe) (IMA2005-058a) 8.BF.05 [no]
  2. Fluorarrojadite-(BaNa) (IMA2016-075) 8.BF.05 [no] [no]
36. Fluorbarytolamprophyllite (seidozerite, lamprophyllite: IMA2016-089) 9.B?. [no] [no]
37. Fluorbritholite (apatite) 9.AH.25
  (IUPAC: (REE,calcium) tri(tetraoxysilicate) fluoride)
  1. Fluorbritholite-(Ce) (IMA1991-027) 9.AH.25 [no]
  2. Fluorbritholite-(Y) (IMA2009-005) 9.AH.25 [no]
38. Fluor-buergerite (tourmaline: IMA1965-005 Rd) 9.CK.05
39. Fluorcalciobritholite (apatite: IMA2006-010) 9.AH.25 [no]
40. Fluorcalciomicrolite (microlite, pyrochlore: IMA2012-036) 4.0 [no] [no]
41. Fluorcalciopyrochlore (pyrochlore, pyrochlore: IMA2013-055) 4.0 [no] [no]
42. Fluorcalcioroméite (roméite, pyrochlore: IMA2012-093) 4.0 [no] [no]
43. Fluorcanasite (IMA2007-031) 9.DG.80 [no]
44. Fluorcaphite (apatite: IMA1996-022) 8.BN.05
  (IUPAC: strontium calcium tricalcium fluoro triphosphate)
45. Fluorcarletonite (IMA2019-038) 9.EB.20 [no] [no]
46. Fluorcarmoite-(BaNa) (arrojadite: IMA2015-062) 8.0 [no] [no]
47. Fluorchegemite (humite: IMA2011-112) 9.A?. [no] [no]
  (IUPAC: heptacalcium tri(tetraoxysilicate) difluoride)
48. Fluor-dravite (tourmaline: IMA2009-089) 9.CK.05 [no] [no]
49. Fluor-elbaite (tourmaline: IMA2011-071) 9.CK. [no] [no]
50. Fluorellestadite (apatite: IMA1987-002 Rd) 9.AH.25
  (IUPAC: 1/2[decacalcium tritetraoxysilicate trisulfate fluoride])
51. Fluorite (fluorite: 1873) 3.AB.25
  (IUPAC: calcium difluoride)
52. Fluorkyuygenite (mayenite: IMA2013-043) 4.CC. [no] [no]
  (Ca_{12}Al_{14}O_{32}[(H_{2}O)_{4}F_{2}])
53. Fluorlamprophyllite (seidozerite, lamprophyllite: IMA2013-102) 9.B?. [no] [no]
54. Fluor-liddicoatite (tourmaline: IMA1976-041 Rd) 9.CK.05
55. Fluorluanshiweiite (mica: IMA2019-053) 9.E [no] [no]
56. Fluormayenite (mayenite: IMA2013-019) 4.0 [no] [no]
  (Ca_{12}Al_{14}O_{32}[☐_{4}F_{2}])
57. Fluornatrocoulsellite (pyrochlore: IMA2009-070) 3.0 [no] [no]
  (IUPAC: calcium trisodium aluminium trimagnesium tetradecafluoride)
58. Fluornatromicrolite (microlite, pyrochlore: IMA1998-018) 4.DH.15
59. Fluornatropyrochlore (pyrochlore, pyrochlore: IMA2013-056) 4.DH. [no] [no]
60. Fluoro-cannilloite [Ca-amphibole: IMA2012 s.p., fluorocannilloite (IMA2004 s.p.), fluor-cannilloite (IMA1993-033) Rd] 9.DE. [no]
61. Fluorocronite (fluorite: IMA2010-023) 3.AB. [no] [no]
  (IUPAC: lead difluoride)
62. Fluoro-edenite [Ca-amphibole: IMA2012 s.p., IMA1994-059 Rd] 9.DE. [no]
63. Fluorokinoshitalite (mica: IMA2010-001) 9.EC.35 [no] [no]
64. Fluoro-leakeite [Na-amphibole: IMA2012 s.p., fluoro-aluminoleakeite (IMA2009-012) Rd] 9.DE. [no]
65. Fluoro-nybøite [Na-amphibole: IMA2012 s.p., fluoronyböite (IMA2002-010) Rd] 9.DE. [no]
66. Fluoro-pargasite [Ca-amphibole: IMA2012 s.p., fluoropargasite (IMA2003-050) Rd] 9.DE.
67. Fluoro-pedrizite [Li-amphibole: IMA2012 s.p., fluoro-sodic-pedrizite (IMA2004-002) Rd] 9.DE. [no] [no]
68. Fluorophlogopite (mica: IMA2006-011) 9.EC.20 [no]
69. Fluorpyromorphite (IMA2021-120)
70. Fluoro-richterite [Na-Ca-amphibole: IMA2012 s.p., fluorrichterite (IMA1992-020) Rd] 9.DE. [no]
71. Fluoro-riebeckite [Na-amphibole: IMA2012 s.p., fluor-riebeckite (1966) Rd] 9.DE. [no] [no]
72. Fluoro-taramite [Na-Ca-amphibole: IMA2012 s.p., fluoro-alumino-magnesiotaramite (IMA2006-025) Rd] 9.DE. [no]
73. Fluorotetraferriphlogopite (mica: IMA2010-002) 9.EC.20 [no] [no]
74. Fluoro-tremolite (Ca-amphibole: IMA2016-018) 9.DE.10 [no] [no]
75. Fluorowardite (wardite: IMA2012-016) 8.DL. [no] [no]
  (IUPAC: sodium trialuminium dihydro difluoro diphosphate dihydrate)
76. Fluorphosphohedyphane (apatite: IMA2008-068) 8.BN.05 [no] [no]
  (IUPAC: dicalcium trilead fluoro triphosphate)
77. Fluor-schorl (tourmaline: IMA2010-067) 9.CK.05 [no] [no]
78. Fluorsigaiite (apatite: IMA2021-087a) 8.BN. [no] [no]
79. Fluorstrophite (apatite: IMA2010 s.p., 1962) 8.BN.05
80. Fluor-tsilaisite (tourmaline: IMA2012-044) 9.CK. [no] [no]
81. Fluor-uvite (tourmaline: IMA2011 s.p., IMA2000-030a, 1930 Rd) 9.CK.05
82. Fluorvesuvianite (vesuvianite: IMA2000-037) 9.BG.35 [no]
83. Fluorwavellite (wavellite: IMA2015-077) 8.DC. [no] [no]
  (IUPAC: trialuminium dihydro fluoro diphosphate pentahydrate)
84. Flurlite (IMA2014-064) 8.0 [no] [no]
  (IUPAC: trizinc manganese(II) iron(III) dihydro triphosphate heptawater dihydrate)

=== Fo – Fu ===
1. Foggite (IMA1973-067) 8.DL.05
  (IUPAC: calcium aluminium dihydro phosphate hydrate)
2. Fogoite-(Y) (seidozerite, rinkite: IMA2014-098) 9.B?. [no] [no]
  (IUPAC: dicalcium diyttrium trisodium titanium di(heptaoxo disilicate) (oxofluoride) difluoride)
3. Foitite (tourmaline: IMA1992-034) 9.CK.05
4. Folvikite (IMA2016-026) 6.0 [no] [no]
5. Fontanite (IMA1991-034) 5.EC.05
  (IUPAC: calcium triuranyl dioxo dicarbonate hexahydrate)
6. Fontarnauite (IMA2009-096a) 6.DA.60 [no] [no]
7. Foordite (IMA1984-070) 4.DG.15
  (IUPAC: tin(II) diniobium hexaoxide)
8. Footemineite (IMA2006-029) 8.DA.10 [no]
  (IUPAC: dicalcium pentamanganese(V) tetraberyllium tetrahydro hexaphosphate hexahydrate)
9. Forêtite (IMA2011-100) 8.0 [no]
10. Formanite-(Y) (IMA1987 s.p., 1944) 7.GA.10
  (IUPAC: yttrium tantalate)
11. Formicaite (IMA1998-030) 10.AA.05
  (IUPAC: calcium formiate)
12. Fornacite (fornacite: 1915) 7.FC.10
  (IUPAC: copper dilead chromate hydro arsenate)
13. Forsterite (olivine: 1824) 9.AC.05
  (IUPAC: dimagnesium tetraoxysilicate)
14. Foshagite (Y: 1925) 9.DG.15
  (IUPAC: tetracalcium tri(trioxy silicate) dihydroxyl)
15. Fougèrite (hydrotalcite: IMA2012-B, IMA2003-057 Rd) 4.FL.05 [no]
  (IUPAC: tetrairon(II) diiron(III) dodecahydroxide carbonate trihydrate, Fe^{2+}:Fe^{3+} = 2:1)
  (Note: transforms to lepidocrocite, limonite, goethite in the presence of air.)
16. Fourmarierite (Y: 1924) 4.GB.25
17. Fowlerite^{Q} (Y: 1832) 9.DK.05 [no] [no]
  Note: possibly a variety of rhodonite.
18. Fraipontite (serpentine: 1927) 9.ED.15
19. Francevillite (fritzscheite: IMA2007 s.p., 1957) 4.HB.15
  (IUPAC: barium diuranyl divanadate pentahydrate)
20. Franciscanite (welinite: IMA1985-038) 9.AF.75
  (IUPAC: hexamanganese vanadium(V) di(tetraoxysilicate) hexa(oxy,hydroxyl))
21. Francisite (IMA1989-028) 4.JG.25
  (IUPAC: tricopper bismuth dioxo chloro diselenite(IV))
22. Franckeite (cylindrite: 1893) 2.HF.25b
23. Francoanellite (IMA1974-051) 8.CH.25
  (IUPAC: tripotassium pentaluminium hexa(hydroxophosphate) diphosphate dodecahydrate)
24. Françoisite 8.EC.05
  (IUPAC: REE triuranyl oxohydro phosphate hexahydrate)
  1. Françoisite-(Ce) (IMA2004-029) 8.EC.05 [no]
  2. Françoisite-(Nd) (IMA1987-041) 8.EC.05
25. Franconite (IMA1981-006a) 4.FM.15
  (IUPAC: sodium diniobium hydro pentaoxide trihydrate)
26. Frankamenite (IMA1994-050) 9.DG.90 [no]
27. Frankdicksonite (fluorite: IMA1974-015) 3.AB.25
  (IUPAC: barium difluoride)
28. Frankhawthorneite (tellurium oxysalt: IMA1993-047) 4.FD.25
  (IUPAC: dicopper tellurium(VI) dihydro tetraoxide)
29. Franklinfurnaceite (IMA1986-034) 9.EC.55
30. Franklinite (spinel, spinel: 1819) 4.BB.05
  (IUPAC: zinc diiron(III) tetraoxide)
31. Franklinphilite (stilpnomelane: IMA1990-050) 9.EG.40
32. Fransoletite (IMA1982-096) 8.CA.05
  (IUPAC: tricalcium diberyllium diphosphate di(hydrogenphosphate) tetrahydrate)
33. Franksousaite (IMA2021-096)
34. Franzinite (cancrinite-sodalite: IMA1976-020) 9.FB.05
35. Freboldite (nickeline: 1957) 2.CC.05
  (IUPAC: cobalt selenide)
36. Fredrikssonite (ludwigite: IMA1983-040) 6.AB.30
  (IUPAC: dimagnesium manganese(III) dioxoborate)
37. Freedite (IMA1984-012) 4.JB.65
  (IUPAC: copper(I) octalead pentachloro diarsenite(III) trioxide)
38. Freieslebenite (Y: 1845) 2.JB.15
  (IUPAC: silver lead antimonide trisulfide)
39. Freitalite (IMA2019-116) 10.0 [no] [no]
  (IUPAC: anthracene)
40. Fresnoite (IMA1964-012) 9.BE.15
  (IUPAC: dibarium titanium oxo heptaoxodisilicate)
41. Freudenbergite (IMA1967 s.p., 1961) 4.CC.10
  (IUPAC: sodium (trititanium(IV) iron(III)) octaoxide)
42. Friedelite (pyrosmalite: 1876) 9.EE.10
  (IUPAC: octamanganese(II) pentadecaoxy hexasilicate decahydroxyl)
43. Friedrichbeckeite (milarite: IMA2008-019) 9.CM.
44. Friedrichite (meneghinite: IMA1977-031) 2.HB.05a
  (Cu_{5}Pb_{5}Bi_{7}S_{18})
45. Fritzscheite (fritzscheite: 1865) 4.HB.15
46. Frohbergite (marcasite: 1947) 2.EB.10a
  (IUPAC: iron ditelluride)
47. Frolovite (Y: 1957) 6.AC.20
  (IUPAC: calcium di[tetrahydro borate])
48. Frondelite (rockbridgeite: 1949) 8.BC.10
  (IUPAC: manganese(II) tetrairon(III) pentahydro triphosphate)
49. Froodite (Y: 1958) 2.AC.45a
  (IUPAC: lead dibismuthide)
50. Fuenzalidaite (IMA1993-021) 7.DG.40
51. Fuettererite (tellurium oxysalt: IMA2011-111) 7.A?. [no] [no]
  (IUPAC: trilead hexacopper(II) heptahydro pentachloro tellurium(VI) hexaoxide)
52. Fukalite (IMA1976-003) 9.DQ.05
  (IUPAC: tetracalcium disilicate hexaoxy carbonate dihydroxyl)
53. Fukuchilite (pyrite: IMA1967-009) 2.EB.05a
  (IUPAC: tricopper iron octasulfide)
54. Fulbrightite (IMA2019-032 ) 8.0 [no] [no]
  (IUPAC: calcium di(oxovanadate(IV)) diarsenate tetrahydrate)
55. Fülöppite (plagionite: 1929) 2.HC.10a
  (IUPAC: trilead octaantimonide pentadecasulfide)
56. Furongite (IMA1982 s.p., 1976) 8.EB.50
57. Furutobeite (IMA1978-040) 2.BE.10
