= Kiguma Jack Murata =

Japanese American geochemist (1909–2001)

- Born: December 29, 1909; Marysville, California, U.S.
- Died: December 27, 2001 (aged 91); Sacramento, California, U.S.
- Spouse: Elizabeth F. "Betty" Murata (m. 1938)
- Awards: Fulbright Scholar (Geology, 1984–85)

Kiguma Jack Murata (December 29, 1909 Marysville – December 27, 2001 Sacramento) was a Japanese American geochemist of the U.S. Geological Survey who served as Scientist-in-Charge of the Hawaiian Volcano Observatory from 1958 to 1960. Murata was a fellow of the Mineralogical Society of America and the Geological Society of America, and served on the Standards Committee of the Geochemical Society in 1957.

In 1980, Murata received a Distinguished Service Award from the U.S. Department of the Interior in 1980, the department's highest honor.

== Personal life ==
Murata married Fumiko Elizabeth Kozono in 1938. She was also known as Elizabeth F. Murata by the time of her death.

Kiguma Murata's son, Stephen K. Murata, won an Air Force Commendation Medal in 1967.

== Mineralogy ==
The mineral murataite-(Y), commonly known as murataite, was named for him in 1974. The tree species Ochroma murata (genus Ochroma) is also named for him. Murata was also involved in naming minerals, such as faheyite, which he, with Marie Louise Lindberg, named for Joseph John Fahey.

== Memberships ==
During the 1940s and 50s, he was a member of the Optical Society of America, as well as a member of both the Hawaiian Academy of Science around 1960 and the Society of Economic Paleontologists and Mineralogists in the 1970s.

== Impact ==
Murata died 2001 in Sacramento, California to pneumonia, following a stroke months earlier.

After his death, he was extended a tribute in the House of Representatives by Robert T. Matsui, who described him as "one of the most distinguished scientists and Government employees among Americans of Japanese ancestry in this country."
