= Marie Louise Lindberg =

Mineralogist (1918–2005)

Marie Louise Lindberg (1918–2005; also published as Marie Lindberg Smith (Note: See, for example: Marie Lindberg Smith, Frondel C (September 1968). "The related layered minerals ganophyllite, bannisterite, and stilpnomelane". Mineralogical Magazine. 36 (283): 893–913. Bibcode:1968MinM...36..893S. doi:10.1180/minmag.1968.283.036.01.; Marie Lindberg Smith (February 1970). "Delrioite and metadelrioite from Montrose County, Colorado" (PDF). American Mineralogist. 55 (1–2): 185–200.; Marie Lindberg Smith, Marinenko J, Weeks AD (February 1971). "Comparison of mourite from Karnes county, Texas with mourite from the U.S.S.R." (PDF). American Mineralogist. 56 (1–2): 163–173.; Marie Lindberg Smith, Marinenko J (June 1973). "A reexamination of minasragrite" (PDF). American Mineralogist. 58 (5–6): 531–534.)) was a mineralogist. She was affiliated with the U.S. Geological Survey and noted for her studies of mineralogy in Brazil. Multiple species of mineral were first described by her, including frondelite, faheyite, moraesite, barbosalite, and tavorite. These 5 minerals were all described by her and various collaborators in the 1940s and 1950s, and sourced from a quarry in Galileia, Minas Gerais. As of March 1950, Lindberg held both Bachelor of Arts and Master of Arts degrees.

Lindberg joined the Geological Survey in 1943, and received training from Joe Fahey. In 1953, she and K. J. Murata described a new mineral; they named it faheyite in honor of Fahey. In 2004, the mineral lindbergite was described by Daniel Atencio and named in honor of Lindberg. Notable work outside of Brazil includes paleontology research, including a paper with Wilbert H. Hass on the composition of conodonts (1946); and the discovery of a brazilianite deposit in North Groton, New Hampshire (1947). She also published multiple book reviews in the journal Science during the 1960s.
