= Faizievite =

Cyclosilicate mineral

General
- Category: Silicate mineral, Cyclosilicate
- Formula: K_{2}Na(Ca_{6}Na)Ti_{4}Li_{6}Si_{24}O_{66}F_{2}
- IMA symbol: Fai
- Dana classification: 63.2.10.1
- Crystal system: Triclinic
- Crystal class: Pinacoidal (1̅) (same H-M symbol)
- Space group: P1̅
- Unit cell: a = 9.82, b = 9.82 c = 17.31 [Å], α = 99.209(2)° β = 94.67(2)°, γ = 119.839(1)° (approximated); Z = 1

Identification
- Color: Colorless
- Crystal habit: tabular plates
- Cleavage: None
- Tenacity: Brittle
- Mohs scale hardness: 4-4.5
- Luster: Vitreous
- Diaphaneity: Opaque
- Density: 2.83 (measured)
- Optical properties: Biaxal (+)
- Refractive index: n_{p}=1.65, n_{m}=1.66 (approximated)
- 2V angle: -72^{o} (measured), -70^{o} (calculated, approximated)

Faizievite is a very rare mineral with the formula K_{2}Na(Ca_{6}Na)Ti_{4}Li_{6}Si_{24}O_{66}F_{2}. This triclinic mineral is chemically related to baratovite and katayamalite. Faizievite is a single-locality mineral, coming from the moraine of the Darai-Pioz glacier, Tien Shan Mountains, Tajikistan. Alkaline rocks of this site are famous for containing numerous rare minerals, often enriched in boron, caesium, lithium, titanium, rare earth elements, barium, and others.

== Occurrence and association ==
Faizievite was detected in quartz boulders, together with aegirine, baratovite, fluorite, leucosphenite, pectolite, and polylithionite.

== Notes on chemistry and structure ==
Strontium and trace amounts of rubidium, barium and niobium are present in the structure of faizievite. One of the sodium sites is partially vacant, and fluorine may be substituted by oxygen.

== Relation to other minerals ==
Faizievite is related to beryl and osumilite groups of minerals.
