= Katayamalite =

Pearly-white radioactive mineral

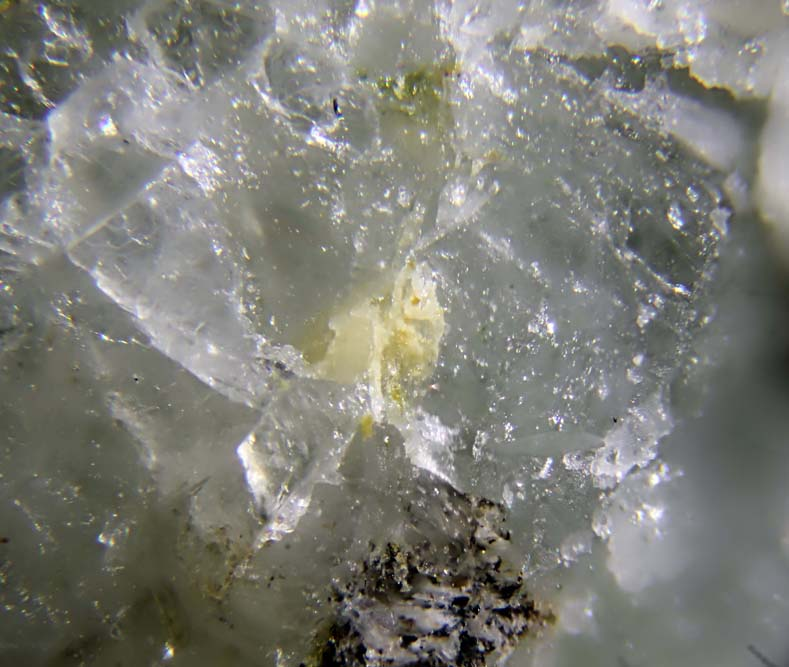

General
- Category: Minerals
- Formula: KLi_{3}Ca_{7}Ti_{2}(SiO_{3})_{12}(OH)_{2}
- IMA symbol: Kyl
- Strunz classification: 9.CJ.25
- Dana classification: 61.01.04.02
- Crystal system: Monoclinic
- Crystal class: Prismatic; H-M symbol: 2/m
- Space group: B2/b
- Unit cell: 3,179.12

Identification
- Color: White
- Crystal habit: Tabular, common twinning
- Cleavage: Perfect on {001}
- Mohs scale hardness: 3.5 - 4
- Luster: Vitreous, pearly
- Streak: White
- Density: 2.91
- Optical properties: Biaxial (+)
- Refractive index: n_{α} = 1.670 n_{β} = 1.671 n_{γ} = 1.677
- 2V angle: Measured: 32; Calculated: 46
- Dispersion: Strong r > v
- Ultraviolet fluorescence: brilliant blue-white under SW
- Other characteristics: Radioactive

Katayamalite is a cyclosilicate mineral that was named in honor of mineralogist and professor Nobuo Katayama. It was approved in 1982 by the International Mineralogical Association, and was first published a year later.

== Relation with baratovite ==
Katayamalite is the hydroxyl analogue of baratovite and the hydroxyl end member of the series, but was first described as a fluor-dominant mineral. Some scientists claim it to be rather hydroxyl- than fluor dominant, which would make baratovite isostructural with it. It would make the two minerals the same species, with baratovite having priority. As the case hadn't been clarified, katayamalite remains an IMA-approved mineral until this day.

== Chemical properties ==
Katayamalite mainly consists of oxygen (43.16%), silicon (24.25%), calcium (20.18%), but otherwise contains titanium (6.89%), potassium (2.81%), lithium (1.50%). It has trace amounts of fluorine (0.68%), sodium (0.41%) and hydrogen (0.11%) in its composition as well. It has a barely detectable radioactivity, 40.21 measured in Gamma Ray American Petroleum Institute Units. The concentration of it in percentage is 2.49. It was originally described as having a triclinic symmetry in 1985, but the structure was redetermined to be monoclinic in 2013. It has a radiant blue-white fluorescence, and platy morphology.

== Occurrence ==
The mineral is associated with sugilite, albite and aegirine. Crystals are usually twinned. This mineral can be found in aegirine syenite.
