= Wilmot Hyde Bradley =

American geologist (1899–1979)

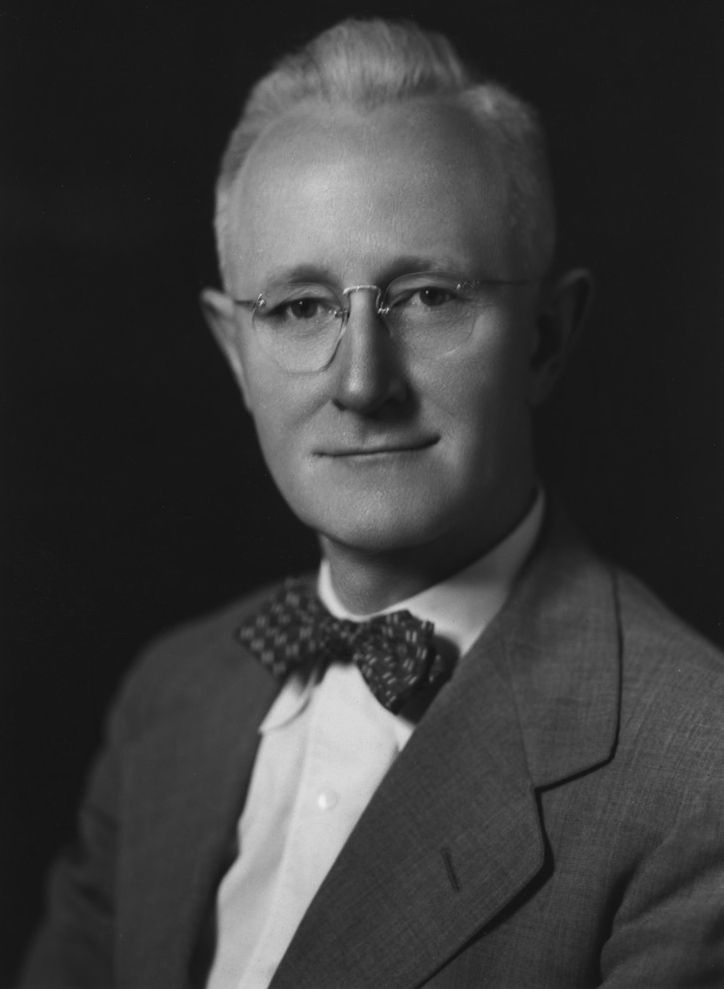
Wilmot Hyde Bradley

Wilmot Hyde Bradley (commonly shortened to Bill Bradley; April 4, 1899 – April 12, 1979) was an American geologist who served as Chief Geologist of the U.S. Geological Survey from 1944 to 1959, and as President of the Geological Society of America in 1965. He was the tenth Chief Geologist, and his tenure was the longest of any Chief Geologist at the time.

Bradley was born on April 4, 1899 in Westville, Connecticut; the son of Anna Miner Hyde and John Lucius Bradley. He attended college at the Sheffield Scientific School of Yale University. At Yale, he first studied engineering and then chemistry, but switched his major to geology in his senior year and graduated with a Bachelor of Philosophy degree in 1920. From 1920 to 1921, he was an instruction assistant in geology at the university.

The summer after he graduated, Bradley's first U.S. Geological Survey assignment was serving as a field assistant to Frank C. Calkins in the Wasatch Mountains of Utah. For the next two years, Bradley pursued graduate studies at Yale, while working in the summers as an aide to Julian D. Sears. It was during this time that he first became interested in the Green River Formation, and he volunteered himself as a full-time employee of the Survey; in 1922 he began studying the oil shale potential of the region. In 1927, he received his Doctor of Philosophy degree from Yale. As a result of his work on the Green River Formation, in 1941, John Joseph Fahey named a mineral bradleyite in Bradley's honor. In 1943, Bradley co-founded the Geological Survey's Branch of Military Geology and served as its chief.

In 1960, a Festschrift was published in the American Journal of Science to commemorate Bradley's 61st birthday. Entitled The Bradley Volume, it was described in a review as "bring[ing] great pride and pleasure to those of us who find that it is also a fitting tribute to Bill Bradley's keen sense of human values which underscores his concept of a creative research community."

When Bradley left the U.S. Geological Survey in 1970, he and his wife retired to the western shore of Pigeon Hill Bay, Maine, where they tended a 50-acre farm. He continued writing about results from research on the Green River Formation and Mud Lake, Marion County, Florida, which he had studied earlier in his career. Bradley died on April 12, 1979. Multiple locations in Maine are given as to his place of death: Mindat.org attributes his place of death as Pigeon Hill Road in Bangor, while The Washington Post states he died in Milbridge. What is known is that he is buried at a local graveyard situated on his property at Pigeon Hill Road, Steuben, Maine. On his headstone, he had engraved in advance the phrase: "The Earth has music for those who listen".

During his career, Bradley was elected to the National Academy of Sciences in 1946, the American Academy of Arts and Sciences in 1949, and the American Philosophical Society in 1963. He also served as President of the Geological Society of America in 1965, and was awarded the society's Penrose Medal in 1972.

Bradley's legacy is honored through the Bradley Scholar Program of the U.S. Geological Survey's emeritus program, which supports emeritus scientists in research and is named in his honor. The International Association of Limnogeology also established an award in Bradley's name; it was awarded 6 times from 1999 to 2018.
