= Baratovite =

Cyclosilicate mineral

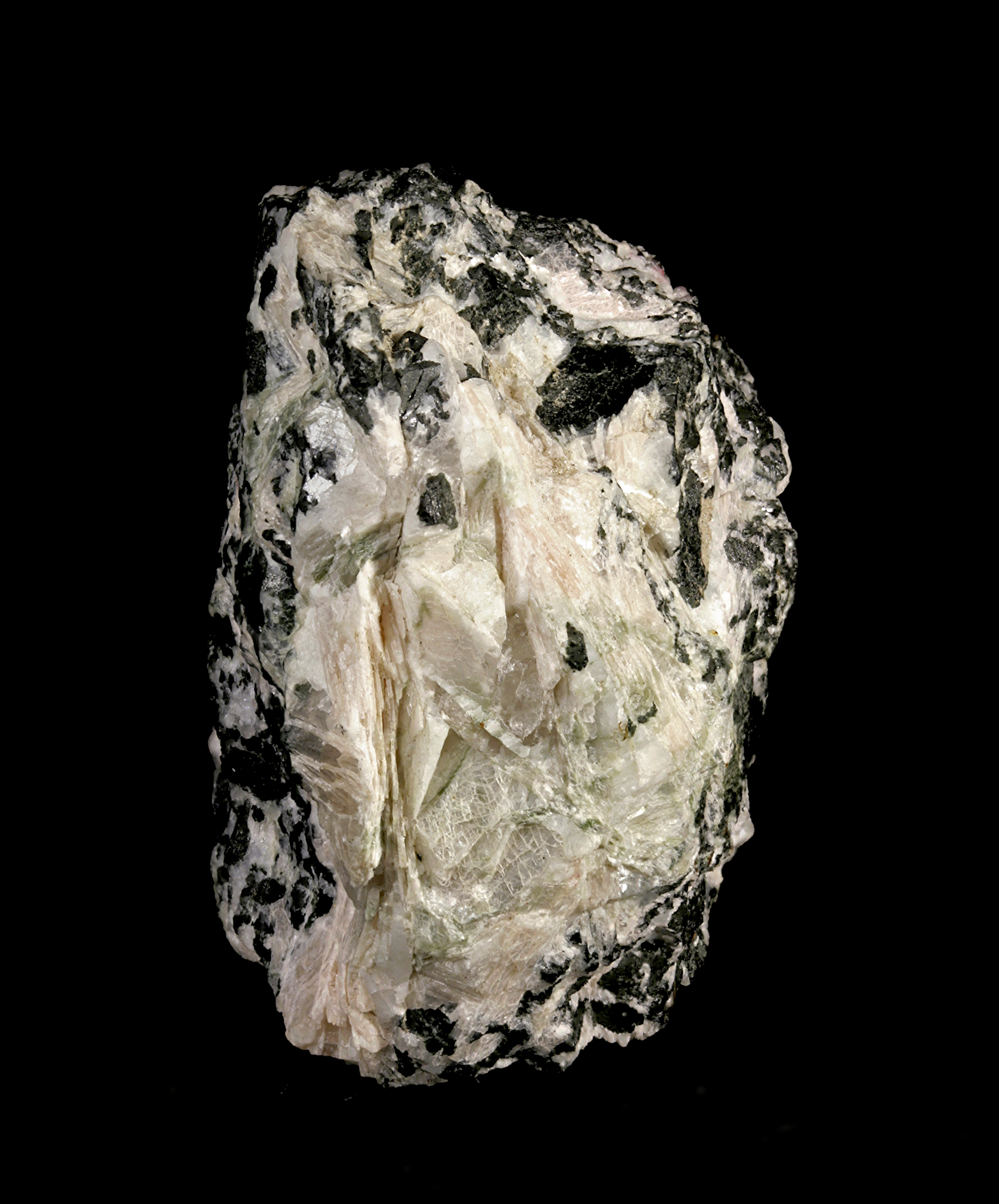

General
- Category: Minerals
- Formula: KCa_{7}(Ti,Zr)_{2}Li_{3}Si_{12}O_{36}F_{2}
- IMA symbol: Btv
- Strunz classification: 9.CJ.25
- Dana classification: 61.1.4.2
- Crystal system: Monoclinic
- Crystal class: Prismatic; H-M symbol: 2/m
- Space group: C2/c
- Unit cell: 3,185.91

Identification
- Color: White, colorless, pink
- Twinning: Common on {001}
- Cleavage: Perfect on {001}
- Fracture: Conchoidal
- Tenacity: Brittle
- Mohs scale hardness: 5 - 6
- Luster: Vitreous, pearly
- Streak: White
- Specific gravity: 2.92
- Density: 2.92
- Optical properties: Biaxial (+)
- Refractive index: n_{α} = 1.674 n_{β} = 1.671 n_{γ} = 1.666
- Birefringence: 0.008
- 2V angle: 60°
- Dispersion: Strong r > v
- Common impurities: Fe, Nb, Mn, Na
- Other characteristics: Radioactive

Baratovite is a very rare cyclosilicate mineral named after Rauf Baratovich Baratov from Tajikistan. It was discovered in 1974 at Dara-Pioz glacier, Tajikistan, and was approved by the International Mineralogical Association only a year later in 1975. The glacier gives home to 133 valid species, and is the type locality of 33 minerals, one of which is baratovite.

== Properties ==
It's a titanium rich variant of aleksandrovite. Although it is considered to be rich in titanium, and the fact it is the fluor-dominant analog of katayamalite, some mineralogist consider baratovite to be a hydroxyl-, rather than fluorine-dominant. In this case, it would make katayamalite the same species, as baratovite is isostructural with it. Common impurities include magnesium, natrium, iron and niobium. Baratovite was originally described to have a 3 - 3.5 hardness on the Mohs scale, which was later corrected to 5 - 6. It has a perfect cleavage in two directions crossing basal plane, in {001}, and the luster of the mineral is pearly on the cleavages. It consists mainly of oxygen (40.88%), silicon (23.92%) and calcium (19.91%), but also contains titanium (5.10%), zirconium (3.24%), potassium (2.78%), fluorine (2.70%) and lithium (1.48%). It has a barely detectable, 39.51 radioactivity, measured in Gamma Ray American Petroleum Institute Units. The concentration per GRapi units in percentage is 2.53. It is the end member of the series. The mineral also shows fluorescent properties. Inspected under short wavelength ultraviolet light, it has a blueish white fluorescence. The mineral is similar to muscovite, but can be distinguished by its fluorescence. Baratovite can either be colorless, white, or have pinkish tints. It forms platy deposits up to 5 cms that are nacre-white, and it grows in patchy granular aggregates. The mineral is monoclinic, probably pseudo-hexagonal, which is shown by the single crystal X-ray study. When inspected under a microscope, it can be clearly seen that the mineral is perfectly homogeneous. The mineral has an extremely low anisotropy.

== Occurrences ==
It's a type locality of Dara-Pioz glacier, Tajikistan, but it also occurs at the Iwagi islet, Japan. It occurs as an accessory mineral. It occurs in the form of veinlets in quartzes, albites and aegirines, and in albitites in syenites. Minerals associated with baratovite vary between localities.

The associated minerals of baratovite specimens found in Dara-i-Pioz massif, Tajikistan are: quartz, albite, ekanite, titanite, aegirine and miserite.

Associated minerals of biotite from Iwagi islet, Japan are: apatite, zircon, pectolite, sugilite, allanite, titanite, aegirine and albite.
