= Geological Society of Washington =

Learned society for geology

The Geological Society of Washington is a learned society based in the Washington, D.C. area. According to its constitution, "The object of the Society is the increase and diffusion of geological knowledge"

== Founding and early history ==
The Geological Society of Washington (GSW) was founded in 1893. The core group of organizers was paleontologist C. D. Walcott and geologists S. F. Emmons and J. S. Diller of the United States Geological Survey (USGS), and artist/geologist W. H. Holmes and geologist G. P. Merrill of the Smithsonian Institution. By the end of February, 1893, they had drafted a constitution and attracted a total of 109 geologists, cartographers, geographers, hydrologists, and other scientists interested in earth science to become charter members. Among these were many notable figures, mostly from the Washington area, including John Wesley Powell, G. K. Gilbert, and F. W. Clarke. The main reason for the founding of GSW was to provide a forum in which geoscientists could meet to discuss their ideas. The robust geological community centered on the USGS and Smithsonian Institution had outgrown mixed scientific societies such as the Philosophical Society of Washington.

In 1897, GSW played a major role in organizing eight scientific societies in Washington, leading to the founding of the Washington Academy of Sciences in 1898.

== Meetings ==
GSW has maintained a single meeting time, location and format throughout its entire history. Meetings are held at 8:00 pm on the second and fourth Wednesdays of each month, except during warm-weather months when most geological field work would normally be done. Almost all meetings have been held at the Cosmos Club in downtown Washington, an organization of which most GSW charter members, as well as many subsequent members, have been members. Most meetings have three formal scientific talks, each 20 minutes in length, followed by discussion. Once a year, the society invites a prominent speaker to give a 1-hour "Bradley lecture," named after the late geologist and GSW president, Wilmot H. Bradley. An Annual Meeting is held in December, at which the president of the society gives a 1-hour address. As of the end of 2008, 3871 papers had been read at 1461 meetings of the society since 1893, according to the GSW archives.

== Publications and awards ==
GSW does not publish scientific papers or give general awards. The philosophy of the society is to communicate good science and encourage collegiality. Awards are therefore given each year for achievement in the following areas at GSW meetings:

- The Bradley Prize is for the best formal scientific talk.
- The Great Dane Award is for the best informal communication to the society of timely or newsworthy events.
- The Sleeping Bear Award, given since 1953, honors the person who displays the most memorable act of genuine good humor, either consciously or unconsciously.

In addition, GSW provides judges for science fairs in the Washington area and gives awards to the best earth science projects.
