= Farneseite =

Feldspathoid mineral

General
- Category: Tectosilicate minerals
- Group: Feldspathoid group, cancrinite group
- Formula: (Na,Ca,K)_{56}(Al_{6}Si_{6}O_{24})_{7}(SO_{4})_{12}·6H_{2}O
- IMA symbol: Far
- Strunz classification: 9.FB.05
- Crystal system: Hexagonal
- Crystal class: Dihexagonal dipyramidal (6/mmm); H-M symbol: (6/m 2/m 2/m)
- Space group: P6_{3}/m
- Unit cell: a = 12.8784, c = 37.0078 [Å]; Z = 1

Identification
- Color: Colorless
- Crystal habit: Prismatic crystals
- Cleavage: Poor on {001}
- Fracture: Conchoidal
- Tenacity: Brittle
- Luster: Vitreous
- Streak: White
- Diaphaneity: Transparent
- Specific gravity: 2.52
- Optical properties: Uniaxial (+)
- Refractive index: n_{ω} 1.499, n_{ε}=1.503
- Birefringence: 0.0040

Farneseite is a mineral from the cancrinite group with 14 layer stacking. It is a complex silicate mineral with formula (Na,Ca,K)_{56}(Al_{6}Si_{6}O_{24})_{7}(SO_{4})_{12}·6H_{2}O. It was named after a location in Farnese, Lazio, Italy. It is a member of the cancrinite group, approved in 2004 as a new mineral species. The group is characterized by the number of stacking layers making up each member, with farneseite being one of newest minerals in the group with a 14 layer stacking structure. It is a clear transparent mineral and has a hexagonal crystal system with crystal class of 6/m and space group of P63/m. The specimens discovered in Farnese were in a pyroclastic rock from the Làtera Cauldera region.

In the volcanic region of Latium, Italy, a few scientists found some crystals with hexagonal morphology while doing a study of the cancrinite-group minerals. These crystals were in a rock sample they had collected from a small village called Farnese in the Viterbo Province, north of Rome. They believed the substance to be sacrofanite, but after several diagnostic tests they observed the powder IR spectrum of the sample showed some differences from sacrofanite. They then performed a complete chemical and structural analysis which confirmed that the substance indeed was a new feldspathoid species related to the cancrinite group. The cancrinite group are minerals with hexagonal and trigonal crystal systems with various anions and cations located in cages within the main frame. The crystal structures of the members of the group are characterized by the six membered rings of SiO_{4} and Al0_{4} tetrahedra. The layers are lined up along the c axis in the ABCABABACBACAC... fashion.

== Composition ==
Farneseite has an ideal chemical formula of [(Na,K)46Ca10]Σ=56(Si42Al42O168)(SO4)12•6H2O. An electron microprobe was used to obtain the micro-chemical composition of farneseite, which broke down the large chemical formula into smaller constituents of oxides that make up the mineral. The bulk of the mineral is composed of Si and Al oxides, both adding up to about 60% of weight. Other oxides of Ca, Na, K and S are also present and make up the difference. A tiny fraction of a percent weight is also due to the presence of F and Cl. Trace amounts of Fe, Ti, Cr, Mg, Mn and Ba were also detected (<0.1 Oxide %). H_{2}O content was also calculated and FTIR spectroscopy confirmed only H_{2}O molecules and no hydroxide ions in the sample.

== Structure ==
A powdered sample of farneseite was used in an X-ray diffraction analysis to determine its structure. From the results obtained, it is evident that the space group of the mineral is P63/m. The unit cell dimensions in the a b c axis respectively are 12.8784 Å, 12.8784 Å and 37.0078 Å. The results also indicated a 14 layer stacking sequence of ABCABABACBACAC... where A, B and C indicate the positions of each layer of a six membered ring. The structure of farneseite agrees with the other minerals in the cancrinite-sodalite group which have layers of six-membered rings of tetrahedra, with each ring linked with three other rings on top and three at the bottom. This makes up a three-dimensional framework. The entire frame of the mineral is made up of Si and Al atoms. The other elements such as O, Ca, Na and K then fit along this ring in specific sites called cages. Within the group, there are various types of cages such as the cancrinite cages, the sodalite cages, the liottite cages, the losod cages among many. The cages have affinities to host certain types of anions and cations. The larger cages host large anions such as SO_{4}, while the smaller cages host the relatively small anions such as Cl, F and H_{2}O. The six membered ring then repeats 14 times, giving the mineral its special 14 layer stacking characteristic. This makes it unique. All minerals in the cancrinite-sodalite group have a similar framework, however, the number of layers of stacking are key in differentiating each mineral. The simplest minerals in the cancrinite-sodalite group have the basic two layer sequence, differing slightly in their Al/Si structure and placement of other anions and cations. These are cancrisilite, vishnevite, hydroxycancrinite, davyne, microsommite, pitiglianoite and quadridavyne.

== Physical properties ==
Most of the crystal fragments of farneseite collected so far are less than 3 mm in diameter, occurring in vugs between interlocking feldspars in pyroclastic rocks. They are colorless, transparent and prismatic. The crystals are elongated along [001] with complex hexagonal shapes and streaked faces. When scratched on a streak plate, it leaves a white mark. Twinning is rarely observed. A crystal with twinning along (1*10) was found. Cleavage is poor in the mineral on {001}. It has a vitreous luster and is not fluorescent. The density that was initially calculated is 2.425 g/cm^{3}. Farneseite is brittle and has conchoidal fracture.

== Geologic occurrence ==
Farneseite has only been reported from its type locality of Latium, which is a volcanic region in Viterbo, Italy. Here, it was found in a pyroclastic rock sequence, believed to be emplaced during the eruptive phases, when the caldera collapsed. The actual processes involved in the formation of the mineral are still enigmatic. Similarly, most other members of the group have also been found in similar conditions in around the same location in Latium.

== Location ==
Farneseite is named after the discovery location of Farnese. Farnese is located in Viterbo Province, Italy in a region called Lazio. Latium is specifically the volcanic region in Italy, not holding any political significance. Farnese is located approximately 100 km (62 mi) northwest of Rome at an elevation of 341 m (1,119 ft) above sea level. It has an area of 52.9 km^{2} (20.4 sq mi).
