= Vishnevite =

Feldspathoid mineral in the cancrinite subgroup

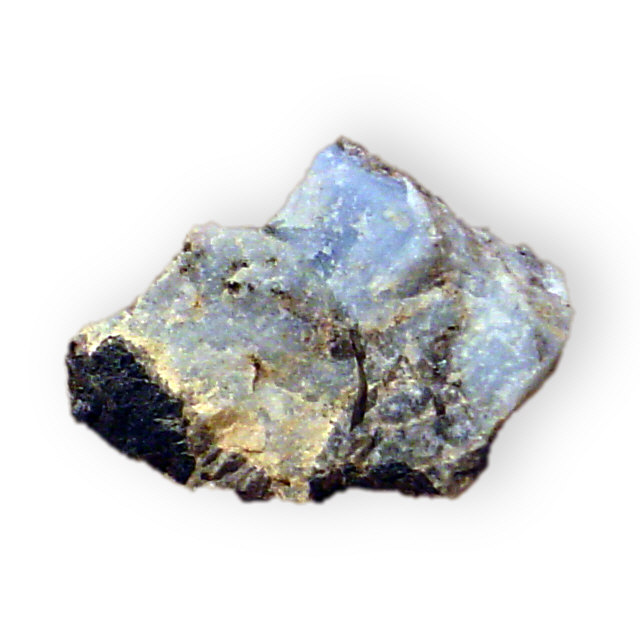
- Vishnevite from Scotland

General
- Category: Tectosilicate minerals
- Group: Feldspathoid group, cancrinite group
- Formula: (Na,Ca,K)_{6}(Si,Al)_{12}O_{24}[(SO_{4}),(CO_{3}),Cl_{2}]_{2-4}·nH_{2}O
- IMA symbol: Vhn
- Strunz classification: 9.FB.05
- Crystal system: Hexagonal
- Crystal class: Pyramidal (6); H-M symbol: (6)
- Space group: P6_{3}
- Unit cell: a = 12.7228(3) c = 5.198(3) [Å]; Z = 1

Identification
- Color: Colorless, light blue, orange-yellow, white
- Cleavage: Perfect
- Mohs scale hardness: 5 - 6
- Luster: Vitreous, pearly
- Streak: White
- Optical properties: Uniaxial (-)
- Refractive index: n_{ω} = 1.490 - 1.507 n_{ε} = 1.488 - 1.495
- Birefringence: δ = 0.002 - 0.012

Vishnevite, or sulfatic cancrinite, is a mineral of the cancrinite group with the chemical formula (Na, Ca, K)_{6}(Si, Al)_{12}O_{24}[(SO_{4}),(CO_{3}), Cl_{2}]_{2-4}·nH_{2}O. It has hexagonal crystals.
