= Ferro-ferri-hornblende =

Amphibole-supergroup mineral

General
- Category: Inosilicate; Amphibole supergroup
- Formula: ☐Ca_{2}(Fe^{2+}_{4}Fe^{3+})(Si_{7}Al)O_{22}(OH)_{2}
- IMA symbol: Ffhbl
- Crystal system: Monoclinic
- Crystal class: Prismatic (2/m) (same H-M symbol)
- Space group: C2/m
- Unit cell: a = 9.93, b = 18.22 c = 5.32 [Å], β = 104.86° (approximated)

Identification

Ferro-ferri-hornblende is an amphibole-supergroup mineral with the formula ☐Ca_{2}(Fe^{2+}_{4}Fe^{3+})(Si_{7}Al)O_{22}(OH)_{2}. It contains essential vacancy (☐). It was discovered in the Traversella mine, Canavese, Torino, Piedmont, Italy.
