= Ferronickel platinum =

Rare occurring mineral

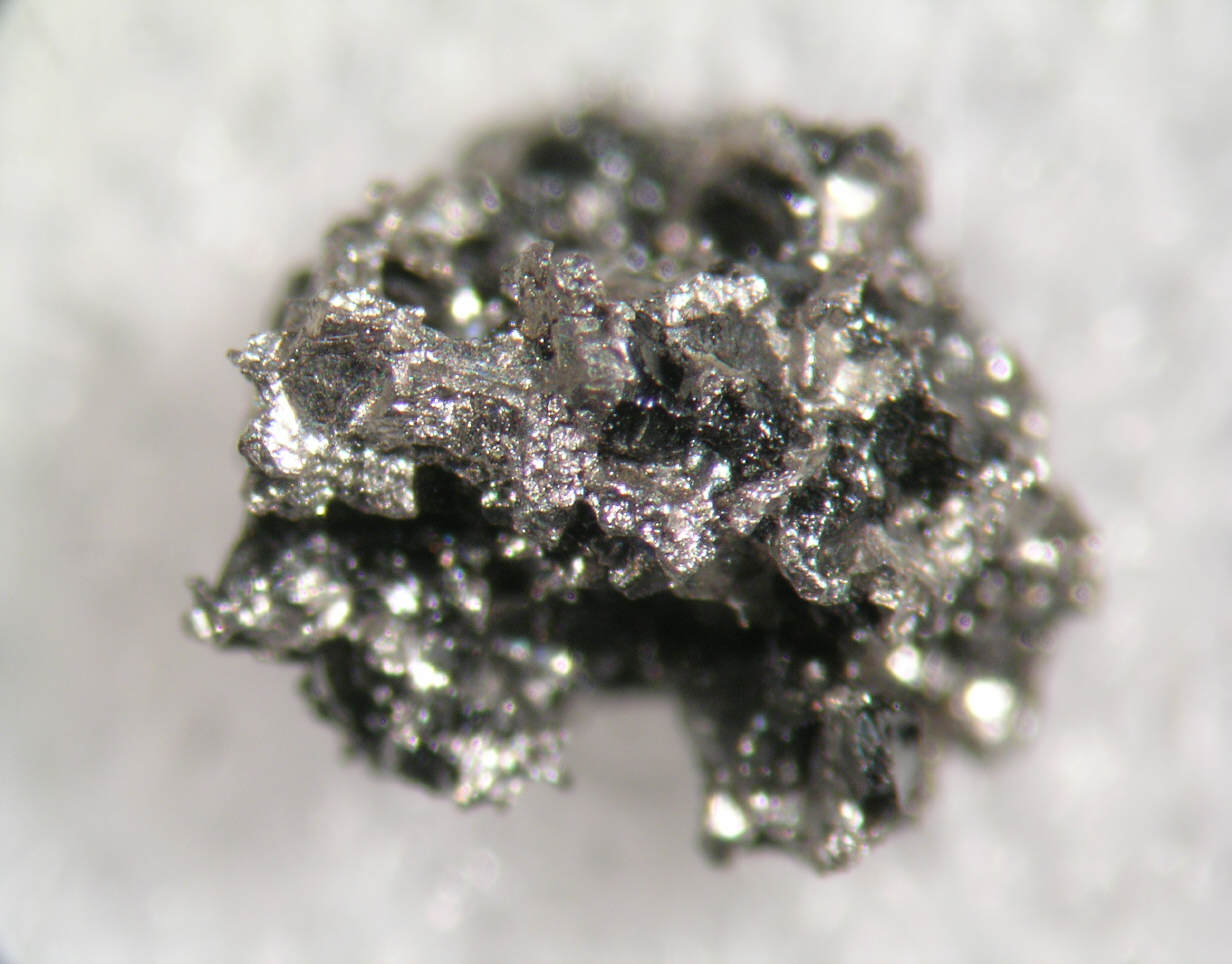
- Small ferronickel platinum nugget (⌀ 4 millimetres (160 mils)) from the Urals region, Russia

General
- Category: Minerals
- Formula: Pt_{2}FeNi; Pt(Ni,Fe)
- IMA symbol: Fnpt
- Strunz classification: 1.AG.40 (8th edition: I/A.15)
- Dana classification: 1.2.4.3
- Crystal system: Tetragonal
- Crystal class: ditetragonal-dipyramidal; 4/m 2/m 2/m
- Space group: P4/mmm (No. 123)

Identification
- Colour: Silver white
- Mohs scale hardness: 4.5 to 5 (VHN_{50}=381–592, average 481)
- Diaphaneity: Opaque

Ferronickel platinum is a very rarely occurring minerals from the mineral class of elements (including natural alloys, intermetallic compounds, carbides, nitrides, phosphides and silicides) with the chemical composition Pt_{2}FeNi and thus is chemically seen as a natural alloy, more precisely an intermetallic compound of platinum, nickel and iron in a ratio of 2:1:1.

Ferronickel platinum crystallizes in the tetragonal crystal system, but has so far only been found in microcrystalline form. Ferronickel platinum occurs together with other platinum group minerals as irregular, slightly rounded or grape-like grains of up to 4.5 millimetres (180 mils) in size, with the mono-mineral areas only up to about 0.15 millimetres (5.9 mils) in size.

Ferronickel platinum is opaque in every form and shows a metallic sheen on the silver-white grain surfaces.

== Etymology and History ==
Ferronickel platinum was discovered for the first time in a soap deposit on the Pekulney River in the Pekulney Mountains of the same name in the Chukotka Autonomous Okrug belonging to Russia. The mineral was described by N. S. Rudashevsky, A. G. Mochalov, Yu. P. Men'shikov and N. I. Shumskaya, who named it based on its chemical composition.

The mineral description and chosen name were submitted to the International Mineralogical Association(IMA) for examination in 1982 (internal register no. 1982-071). This recognized the mineral as independent in the same year. The publication of the new discovery followed the following year in the Russian scientific magazine "Zapiski Vserossiyskogo Mineralogicheskogo Obshchestva" (Proceedings of the Russian Mineralogical Society) and was published in 1984 by Pete J. Dunn et al. when the new mineral names recognized by the IMA were announced.

The type material of the mineral is stored in the State Mining Institute in Saint Petersburg under catalog no. 1306/1.

== Classification ==
As per 8th edition of the mineral classification by Strunz of ferronickel platinum belonged to the mineral class of "elements" and then to the Department of "metals and intermetallic alloys (semimetals)" where he collaborated with Chengdeit, Isoferroplatin, Nielsenit, Tetraferroplatinum and tulameenite formed the unnamed group I / A.15.

The 9th edition of Strunz's mineral systematics, which has been in effect since 2001 and is used by the IMA, also assigns isoferroplatinum to the “Metals and intermetallic compounds” section. However, this is further subdivided according to the predominant metals in the compound, which have been divided into metal families according to their related properties. According to its composition, ferronickel platinum can be found in the sub-section “PGE metal alloys”, where the “tetraferroplatinum group” with system no. 1.AG.40 forms.

The systematics of minerals according to Dana, which is mainly used in the English-speaking world, also assigns ferronickel platinum to the class and there in the department of the same name of "elements". Here it is also together with tetraferroplatinum, tulameenite and potarite in the " tetraferroplatinum group (space group P4/mmm) " with the system no. 02/01/04 within the sub-section "Elements: Platinum Group Metals and Alloys".

== Chemical properties ==
On the basis of six grains in a polished area, the analysis with the aid of the electron microprobe showed the chemical composition of 75.7–77.6% platinum, 10.4–11.0% iron, 10.2–11.7% nickel, 0, 27-0.69% iridium and 0.33-0.36 copper (98.41-100.76% in total), which corresponds to an empirical composition of (Pt_{2.016}Ir_{0.012})Fe_{0.983}(Ni_{0.962}Cu_{0.027}) or the idealized one Composition corresponds to Pt_{2}FeNi. Analyzes of a further four grains showed variable but low contents of Ruthenium, Rhodium, Palladium and Cobalt. Due to the variable Cu-Ni content, however, it is assumed that ferronickel platinum forms a gapless series of mixed crystals with tulameenite (Pt_{2}FeCu).

== Crystal structure ==
Ferronickel platinum crystallizes tetragonally in the space group P4/mmm (space group no. 123) with the lattice parameters a = 2.73 Å and c = 3.64 Å and one formula unit per unit cell.

== Occurrences ==
At its type locality on the Pekulnei River, the mineral was found in the heavy mineral concentrates of quaternary, alluvial deposits together with ultramafites in an ophiolite band. Cherepanovite, chromite, cooperite, hollingworthite, irarsite, isoferroplatinum, laurite, olivine, rutheniridosmin, sperrylite and tetraferroplatinum appeared as accompanying minerals.

In Russia they found ferronickel platinum out of the river Pekulnei still in Koriak-Kamchatka - folding zone in the Far East and in Kytlym complex and at the nearby platinum mine Gosshakhta in the Sverdlovsk Oblast in the Urals.

Other sites known to date (as of 2018) are the Loma Peguera open pit nickel mine about 11 km northeast of Bonao in the Dominican Republic, the Bir Bir river in the Ethiopian region of Oromia, the Ophiolithe on Île Ouen in the municipality of Le Mont-Dore in New Caledonia, the Bushveld Complex in South Africa and an unspecified site near Nottingham Township in Chester County in the US state of Pennsylvania.

== See also ==
- List of minerals

== Literature ==
- N. S. Rudashevsky, A. G. Mochalov, Yu. P. Men'shikov, N. I. Shumskaya: Ferronickelplatinum Pt2FeNi – a new mineral species. In: Zapiski Vserossiyskogo Mineralogicheskogo Obshchestva. Band 112, Nr. 4, 1983, S. 487–494.
- Pete J. Dunn, Louis J. Cabri, James A. Ferraiolo, Joel D. Grice, John Leslie Jambor, Wolfgang Mueller, James E Shigley, Jacek Puziewicz and David A. Vanko: New Mineral Names. In: American Mineralogist. Band 69, 11 und 12, 1984, S. 1190–119
- P. Bayliss; Revised unit-cell dimensions, space group, and chemical formula of some metallic minerals. The Canadian Mineralogist; 28 (4):, 1990, pp 751–755
