= Ferronigerite-2N1S =

Oxide mineral

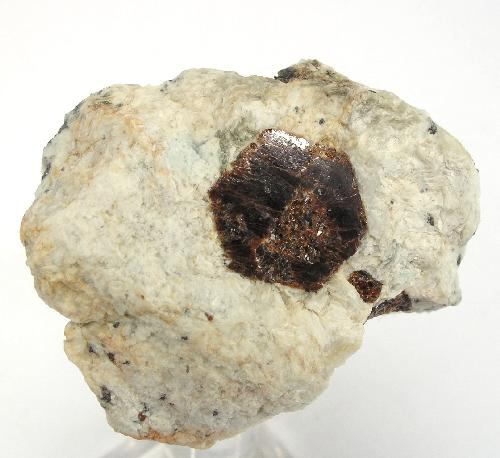
- Ferronigerite-2N1S from Stiepelmann mine, Arandis, Swakopmund district, Erongo region, Namibia

General
- Category: Oxide minerals
- Formula: (Zn,Mg,Fe^{2+})(Sn,Zn)_{2}(Al,Fe^{3+})_{12}O_{22}(OH)_{2}
- IMA symbol: Fng-2N1S
- Strunz classification: 4.FC.20
- Crystal system: Trigonal
- Crystal class: Hexagonal scalenohedral (3̅m); H-M symbol: (3̅ 2/m)
- Space group: P3̅m1

Identification

Ferronigerite-2N1S is an iron, tin, alumino-hydroxide mineral that naturally occurs around sillimanite-quartz veins. Ferronigerite-2N1S belongs to the nigerite group, högbomite supergroup. The other constituents of the nigerite group are ferronigerite-6N6S, magnesionigerite-2N1S, magnesionigerite-6N6S, zinconigerite-2N1S and zinconigerite-6N6S. The 2N1S ending stands for the nolanite and spinel structural layers.

Ferronigerite-2N1S was first discovered in the Kabba province of central Nigeria in 1944; it was originally named Nigerite. Its name was later changed to nigerite-6H then to nigerite-6T and in 2003 ferronigertie-2N1S was approved by the International Mineralogical Association.

== Chemical composition ==
The general chemical formula of ferronigertie-2N1S is (Zn,Mg,Fe^{2+})(Sn,Zn)_{2}(Al,Fe^{3+})_{12}O_{22}(OH)_{2} or Sn(Fe,Mg)Al_{6}O_{11}(OH).

Its percent composition is 50.91% Al_{2}O_{3}, 25.33% SnO_{2}, 11.90% Fe_{2}O_{3}, 4.51% ZnO, 2.65% FeO, 1.57% H_{2}O, 1.28% MgO, and less than 1% of PbO, SiO_{2}, TiO_{2} and MnO. Due to its chemical composition, it is not susceptible to decomposition or solubility in acids. Ferronigerite-2N1S has also been found in some cases to have a lithium substitution for tin and titanium; this aids in charge balancing.

== Properties ==
Ferronigerite-2N1S possesses no prominent cleavage but does possess a weak basal cleavage. It has a light grey to white streak, and often is shiny dark brown in color. Although the color can also be yellow to light brown. The variance of color is due to the individual composition to the mineral and where it is found geologically. It has a relative hardness of 8-9 on Mohs relative hardness scale.

== Structure ==
Ferronigerite-2N1S crystallizes in the trigonal 3̅2/m crystal class and a space group of P3̅m1. It exhibits two types of close pack structures: cubic close packed and hexagonal close packed. This results in ferronigerite-2N1S looking like simple hexagonal plates.

== Geologic occurrence ==
Ferronigerite-2N1S has been found to be associated with Precambrian schists, gneisses, and granites, in the Tsomtsaub tin mine in the Egbe District, Kabba Provence in central Nigeria. It is generally associated with microcline-quartz-pegmatites in small amounts and limited in association only to that of old granite, shists, and gneisses. It is also associated with microcline-quartz-mica-pegmities, which make up to bulk of economically advantageous deposits of cassiterite where Ferronigerite-2N1S is found in association. The most common geologic structure where it is present is in sillimanite-quartz veins which are paired closely with gahnite. While microcline-quartz-mica-pegmities and Precambrian schists, gneisses and granites are common in Africa, sillimanite-quartz veins are more common in other parts of the world.
