= Florencite-(Sm) =

Mineral of the plumbogummite group

General
- Category: Phosphate mineral
- Formula: SmAl_{3}(PO_{4})_{2}(OH)_{6}
- IMA symbol: Flo-Sm
- Crystal system: Trigonal
- Crystal class: Hexagonal scalenohedral (3̅m); H-M symbol: (3̅ 2/m)
- Space group: R3̅m
- Unit cell: a = 6.972, c = 16.182 [Å]; Z = 3

Identification
- Color: Colorless, pale pink, pale yellow
- Crystal habit: Sub-mm zones in florencite-(Ce) crystals
- Cleavage: {0001}, distinct
- Fracture: Uneven
- Mohs scale hardness: 5.5-6
- Luster: Vitreous to greasy
- Streak: White
- Density: 3.6 (measured)
- Optical properties: Uniaxal(+)
- Refractive index: nω=1.70, nε=1.71

Florencite-(Sm) is a very rare mineral of the plumbogummite group (alunite supergroup) with simplified formula SmAl_{3}(PO_{4})_{2}(OH)_{6}. Samarium in florencite-(Sm) is substituted by other rare earth elements, mostly neodymium. It does not form separate crystals, but is found as zones in florencite-(Ce), which is cerium-dominant member of the plumbogummite group. Florencite-(Sm) is also a samarium-analogue of florencite-(La) (lanthanum-dominant) and waylandite (bismuth-dominant), both being aluminium-rich minerals.

== Occurrence and association ==
Florencite-(Sm) was revealed in quartz veins in the Maldynyrd Range, Subpolar Urals, Russia. It associates with xenotime-(Y).

== Notes on chemistry ==
Florencite-(Sm) has admixtures of neodymium, and small amounts of cerium, gadolinium, sulfur, strontium, praseodymium, calcium, lanthanum, europium, and silicon.
