= Franklinphilite =

Phyllosilicate mineral in the stilpnomelane group

General
- Category: Phyllosilicate minerals
- Group: Stilpnomelane group
- Formula: K_{4}(Mn)_{48}(Si,Al)_{72}(O,OH)_{216}·n(H_{2}O) (with n~6)
- IMA symbol: Fkp
- Strunz classification: 9.EG.40
- Crystal system: Triclinic; Unknown space group
- Unit cell: a = 5.52, b = 9.56 c = 36.57 [Å]; Z = 6 α = β = γ = essentially 90°

Identification
- Color: Dark brown
- Crystal habit: Fine radial aggregates; pseudo-hexagonal
- Cleavage: Imperfect on {001}
- Tenacity: Brittle
- Mohs scale hardness: 4
- Luster: Vitreous to slightly resinous
- Diaphaneity: Translucent to nearly opaque
- Specific gravity: 2.6 - 2.8
- Optical properties: Biaxial (-)
- Refractive index: n_{α} = 1.545 n_{β} = 1.583 n_{γ} = 1.583
- Birefringence: δ = 0.038
- Pleochroism: Distinct; X = pale yellow; Y = Z = deep brown
- 2V angle: 10°

Franklinphilite is a phyllosilicate of the stilpnomelane group. Known from only two localities (with a third unconfirmed locality in Switzerland), it was found exclusively from the Franklin and Sterling Hill mines in Franklin, Sussex County, New Jersey until 2013, when a locality in Wales was confirmed.

== Composition ==
Franklinphilite has an ideal chemical formula of K_{4}(Mn)_{48}(Si,Al)_{72}(O,OH)_{216}·n(H_{2}O) (with n~6). Reported formula is (K,Na)_{4}(Mn^{2+},Mg,Zn)_{48}(Si,Al)_{72}(O,OH)_{216}·6(H_{2}O).

== Structure ==
Consistent with phyllosilicates, franklinphilite is composed of long flat sheets of linked silicon-oxygen and aluminium-oxygen tetrahedra bounded by an octahedral layer containing either potassium or manganese and is isostructural with lennilenapeite.

== Physical properties ==
Franklinphilite is dark brown to black and possesses a vitreous to slightly resinous luster. It is brittle, with a hardness of about 4 (Mohs), and cleaves imperfectly along the {001} plane. The density varies due to impurities, but ranges from 2.6 to 2.8 g/cm^{3} compared to the calculated value of 2.66 g/cm^{3}. It is translucent to nearly opaque, translucent in thin section and has a light brown streak. Pleochroism is distinctive with X = pale yellow and Y,Z = deep brown. Dispersion was not detected and no evident fluorescence under ultra-violet radiation was observed.

== History ==
In 1938, C. Osborne Hutton described a manganoan member of stilpnomelane and incorrectly assumed it to be parsettensite. It was later described in 1984 by Pete J. Dunn, Donald R. Peacor and William B. Simmons as a Mn dominant stilpnomelane, similar to parsettensite. Naming franklinphilite was like then deferred, due to findings of only 34 mol % of the theoretical manganese end-member, making it manganese dominant by plurality. In 1992, franklinphilite was revisited by Dunn, Peacor and Shu-Chu Su and given an International Mineral Association recognized name. Although all franklinphilite specimens originated exclusively from the Buckwheat dump, large amounts of manganese silicates in the area suggest a high probability of other assemblages. Franklinphilite was named for the type locality (Franklin) and the Greek word Greek: φιλόϛ, romanized: philos, lit. 'friend'. The name alludes to the unique elements of its chemical composition that contribute to the uniqueness of Franklin and Sterling Hill and the geologists, mineralogists and collectors, friends of Franklin, who helped contribute towards the understanding of the region.
