= Fluorwavellite =

Rare phosphate mineral

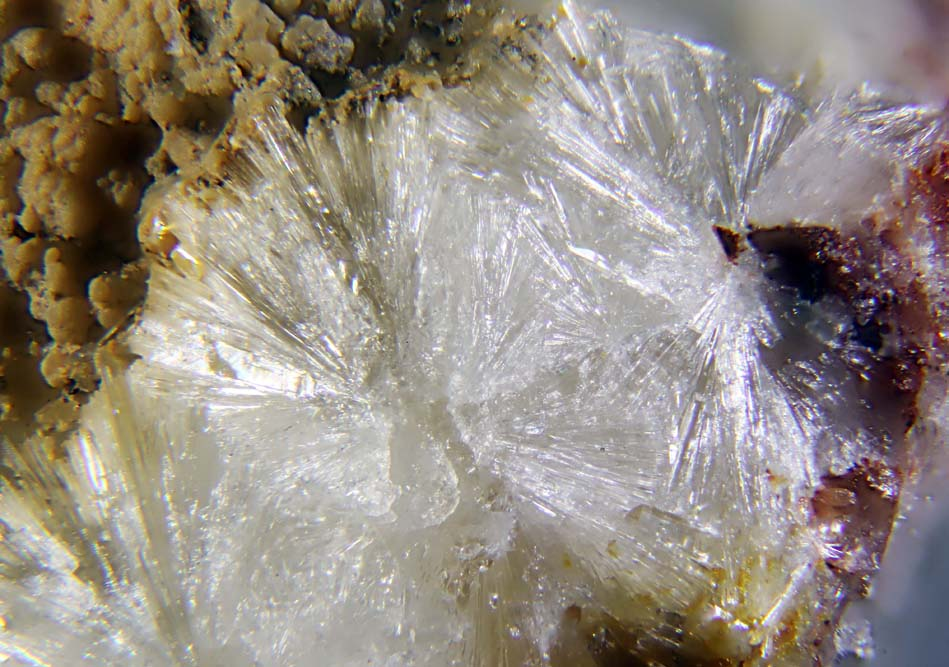
- Fluorwavellite found in Nevada

General
- Category: Phosphate
- Formula: Al_{3}(PO_{4})_{2}(OH)_{2}F•5H_{2}O
- IMA symbol: Fwav
- Crystal system: Orthorhombic
- Crystal class: Dipyramidal (mmm); H-M symbol: (2/m 2/m 2/m)
- Space group: Pcnm
- Unit cell: a = 9.63, b = 17.37 c = 6.99 [Å] (approximated)

Identification

Fluorwavellite is a rare phosphate mineral with formula Al_{3}(PO_{4})_{2}(OH)_{2}F•5H_{2}O. As suggested by its name, it is a fluorine-analogue of wavellite (hence its name), a rather common phosphate mineral. Chemically similar aluminium fluoride phosphate minerals include fluellite, kingite and mitryaevaite.

== Occurrence ==
Fluorwavellite was discovered in Silver Coin mine, Valmy, Humboldt County, Nevada, US.
