= Fraipontite =

Phyllosilicate mineral in the serpentine subgroup

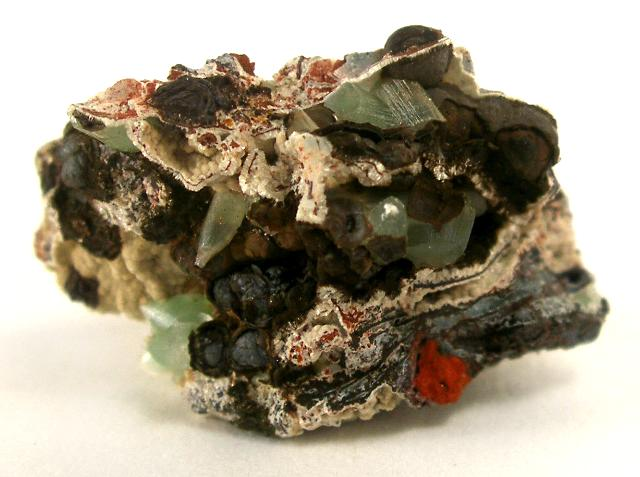
- Pockets of minute pearly white fraipontite crystals with green smithsonite from Laurium, Greece (size: 1.4 x 1.0 x 0.9 cm)

General
- Category: Phyllosilicate minerals
- Group: Kaolinite-Serpentine group, serpentine subgroup
- Formula: (Zn,Al)_{3}(Si,Al)_{2}O_{5}(OH)_{4}
- IMA symbol: Fpt
- Strunz classification: 9.ED.15
- Crystal system: Monoclinic
- Crystal class: Domatic (m) (same H-M symbol)
- Space group: Cm
- Unit cell: a = 5.34, b = 9.21 c = 14.12 [Å]; β = 93.2°; Z = 2

Identification
- Color: Blueish, yellow white light green
- Crystal habit: Fibrous to porcelaneous massive
- Mohs scale hardness: 3.5 – 4
- Luster: Silky
- Streak: White to pale green
- Diaphaneity: Opaque to translucent
- Specific gravity: 3.08 – 3.10
- Optical properties: Biaxial (-)
- Refractive index: n_{α} = 1.620 n_{β} = 1.624 n_{γ} = 1.624
- Birefringence: δ = 0.004
- 2V angle: Measured: 15° to 20°

Fraipontite is a zinc aluminium silicate mineral with a formula of (Zn,Al)_{3}(Si,Al)_{2}O_{5}(OH)_{4}.

It is a member of the kaolinite-serpentine mineral group and occurs as an oxidation product of zinc deposits. It occurs with smithsonite, gebhardite, willemite, cerussite and sauconite.

It was first described in 1927 for an occurrence in Vieille Montagne, Verviers, Liège Province, Belgium. It was named for Julien Jean Joseph Fraipont (1857–1910), and Charles de Fraipont, geologists of Liege, Belgium. In addition to the type locality in Belgium, it has been reported from Tsumeb, Namibia; Laurium, Greece; Swaledale, North Yorkshire, England; the Silver Bill mine, Cochise County, Arizona, the Blanchard Mine, Socorro County, New Mexico and the Mohawk mine, San Bernardino County, California in the US; and from the Ojuela mine, Mapimi, Durango, Mexico.

A synonym of the fraipontite is the zinalsite, which was reported in 1956 for an occurrence in Kazakhstan.
