= Foitite =

Tourmaline mineral

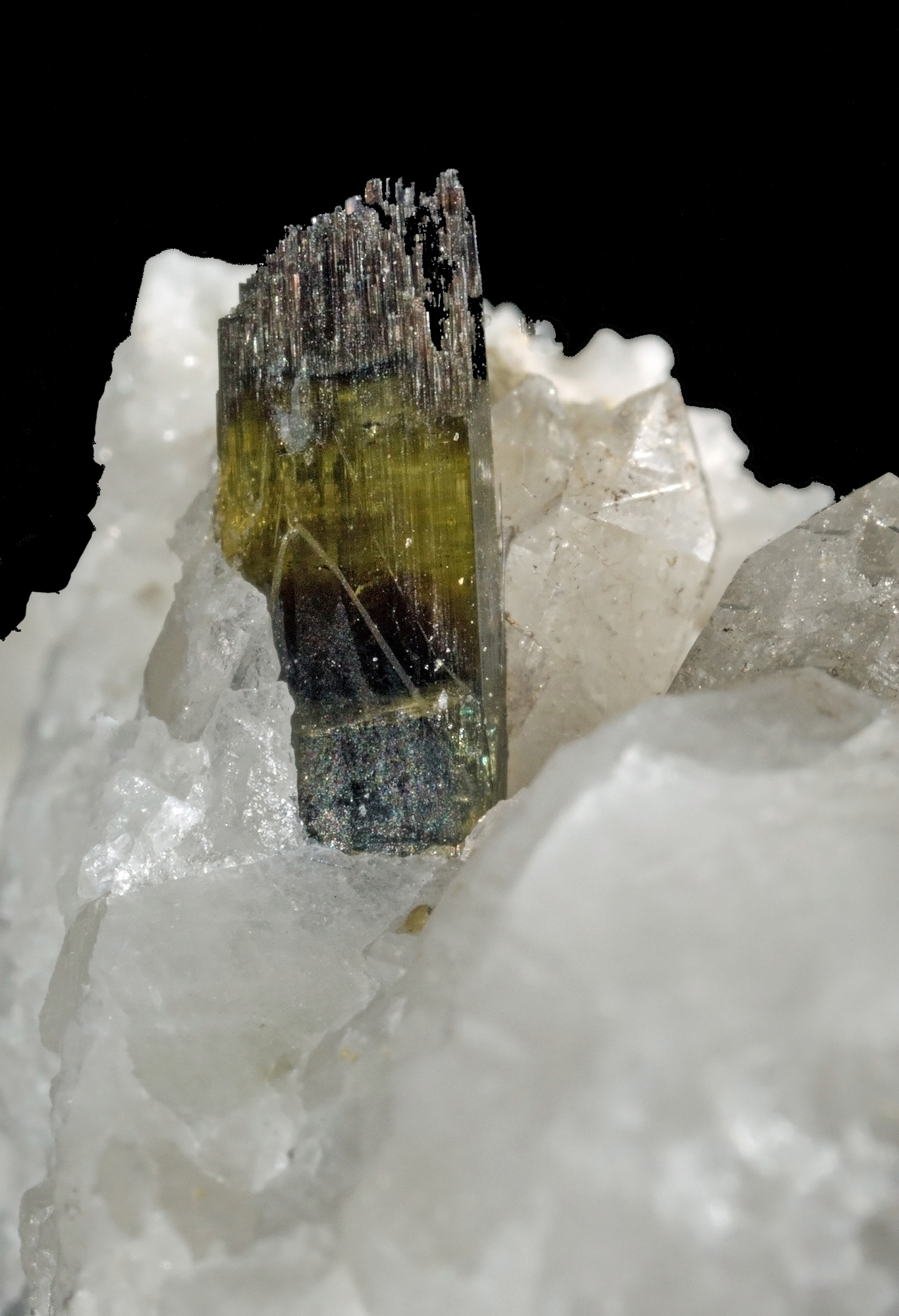

General
- Category: Minerals
- IMA symbol: Foi
- Crystal system: Trigonal

Identification
- Mohs scale hardness: 7

Foitite is a mineral in the tourmaline group, it is a vacancy-dominant member of the group. Foitite is in the 'vacancy' group, due to the absence of atoms in the X site.

According to the Czech Geological Society, foitite is rare. However foitite is quite common among low-temperature tourmalines and it might be more common than previously thought.

The color of the mineral is dark indigo with purple tints to bluish-black.

== Name ==
The mineral was named in 1993 by D. J. MacDonald, Frank C. Hawthorne, and Joel D.Grice after Franklin F. Foit, Jr.

== Chemistry ==
Foitite lacks alkalis like sodium.

Foitite is a member of the tourmaline mineral group, which is a complex aluminum borosilicate. The chemical formula of foitite is ◻(Fe^{2+}_{2}Al)Al_{6}(Si_{6}O_{18})(BO_{3})_{3}(OH)_{3}(OH).

In this formula, sodium (Na) acts as the dominant cation, iron (Fe3+) replaces some of the aluminum (Al) in the crystal structure, and boron (B) replaces some of the silicon (Si) atoms. The BO3 groups are trigonal planar borate ions, and the OH groups represent hydroxyl ions.

The crystal structure of foitite consists of continuous chains of silicon-oxygen tetrahedra, with aluminum and boron ions substituting within these chains. The aluminum and boron substitutions create charge imbalances, which are compensated by the presence of sodium and iron ions.

Foitite typically forms in granitic rocks enriched in boron, such as pegmatites. It is commonly associated with other minerals such as quartz, feldspar, and muscovite. The presence of iron in foitite gives it a characteristic black color.

Foitite's elemental weight composition includes:

Elements	Weight (%)
Oxygen	49.523%
Aluminium	18.858%
Silicon	16.826%
Iron	11.152%
Boron	3.238%
Hydrogen	0.403%

== Occurrence ==
It occurs in quartz veins and possibly occurs in granite pegmatites.

Its type locality is California. Foitite has also been reported in Marquette County, Michigan. It has been reported in Wales and it is predicted that a more widespread distribution of the mineral in Wales will be shown.
