= Joseph John Fahey =

American geologist (1901–1980)

Joseph John Fahey (July 30, 1901 – June 29, 1980) was an American geologist and geochemist. He joined the U.S. Geological Survey in 1927, where he worked until his retirement in 1971. During his career, he named seventeen minerals, including bradleyite, edgarbaileyite, loughlinite, mansfieldite, and wherryite. The mineral faheyite was named after him in 1953.

Fahey was born in Massena, New York on July 30, 1901. He and his family soon moved to Washington, D.C., where he attended Gonzaga High School and was educated in the classics. Fahey first enrolled at Catholic University, where he studied chemistry from 1919 to 1921; he transferred to George Washington University that year. He stayed enrolled at the university and studied at night until 1925, though issues with the transferring of credits meant he never received a Bachelor of Science degree even with all required credits completed. From 1922 to 1927, he was employed by the U.S. Bureau of Public Roads, and was transferred to the Geological Survey in 1927. At the beginning of his Geological Survey career he was a junior chemist, but rose the ranks until he was appointed Principal Chemist in 1941, a title he held until his 1971 retirement.

Fahey was a member of many learned societies, including the Geological Society of Washington, to which he presented a memorial at their 1968 meeting; and the Chemical Society of Washington, (Note: A local chapter of the American Chemical Society.) of which he served as president. He was also a fellow of the Washington Academy of Sciences, and served as their vice president.

He died at the Fairland Nursing Home in Silver Spring, Maryland, (Note: His place of death has also been attributed as Adelphi, Maryland, which is adjacent to Silver Spring.) on June 29, 1980. At the time of his death, he was a life fellow of the Mineralogical Society of America, and a fellow of the Geological Society of America. He was also a former resident of University Park, Maryland.
