= Fluorcarmoite-(BaNa) =

Rare phosphate mineral

General
- Category: Phosphate
- Formula: Ba[]Na_{2}Na_{2}[]CaMg_{13}Al(PO_{4})_{11}(PO_{3}OH)F_{2}
- IMA symbol: Fcm-BaNa
- Crystal system: Monoclinic
- Crystal class: Domatic (m) (same H-M symbol)
- Space group: Cc
- Unit cell: a = 16.40, b = 9.95 c = 24.45 [Å]; β = 105.73° (approximated)

Identification

Fluorcarmoite-(BaNa) is a rare phosphate mineral, belonging to arrojadite group, with the formula Ba[]Na_{2}Na_{2}[]CaMg_{13}Al(PO_{4})_{11}(PO_{3}OH)F_{2}. It is a barium-rich member of the group, as is arrojadite-(BaNa), arrojadite-(BaFe), fluorarrojadite-(BaFe) and an unapproved species ferri-arrojadite-(BaNa). The "-(BaNa)" suffix informs about the dominance of the particular elements (here barium and sodium) at the corresponding structural sites.

== Arrojadite group ==
The arrojadite group is defined in form of the complex, general formula A_{2}B_{2}CaNa_{2+x}M_{13}Al(PO_{4})_{11}(PO_{3}OH_{1−x})W_{2}, where:

- A = large divalent cations (barium, lead, strontium) and vacancy ([]), eventually monovalent cations (potassium, sodium)
- B = small divalent cations (iron, manganese, magnesium) and vacancy ([]), eventually sodium
- M = Fe^{2+} (this gives the root name arrojadite) or Mn^{2+} (root name dickinsonite), or eventually Mg
- W = hydroxyl group or fluorine

The two suffixes in the name correspond to A1 and B1 sites. Third suffix may be present in special cases.
