= Feodosiyite =

Very rare chloride mineral

General
- Category: Halide mineral
- Formula: Cu_{11}Mg_{2}Cl_{18}(OH)_{8}•16H_{2}O
- IMA symbol: Fdy
- Crystal system: Monoclinic
- Crystal class: Prismatic (2/m) (same H-M symbol)
- Space group: P2_{1}/c
- Unit cell: a = 12.90, b = 16.42 c = 11.96 [Å]; β = 113.69° (approximated)

Identification

Feodosiyite is a very rare chloride mineral, just recently approved, with the formula Cu_{11}Mg_{2}Cl_{18}(OH)_{8}•16H_{2}O. Its structure is unique. Feodosiyite comes from the Tolbachik volcano, famous for many rare fumarolic minerals. Chemically similar minerals, chlorides containing both copper and magnesium, include haydeeite, paratacamite-(Mg) and tondiite.
