= Sugilite =

Violet-colored crystal

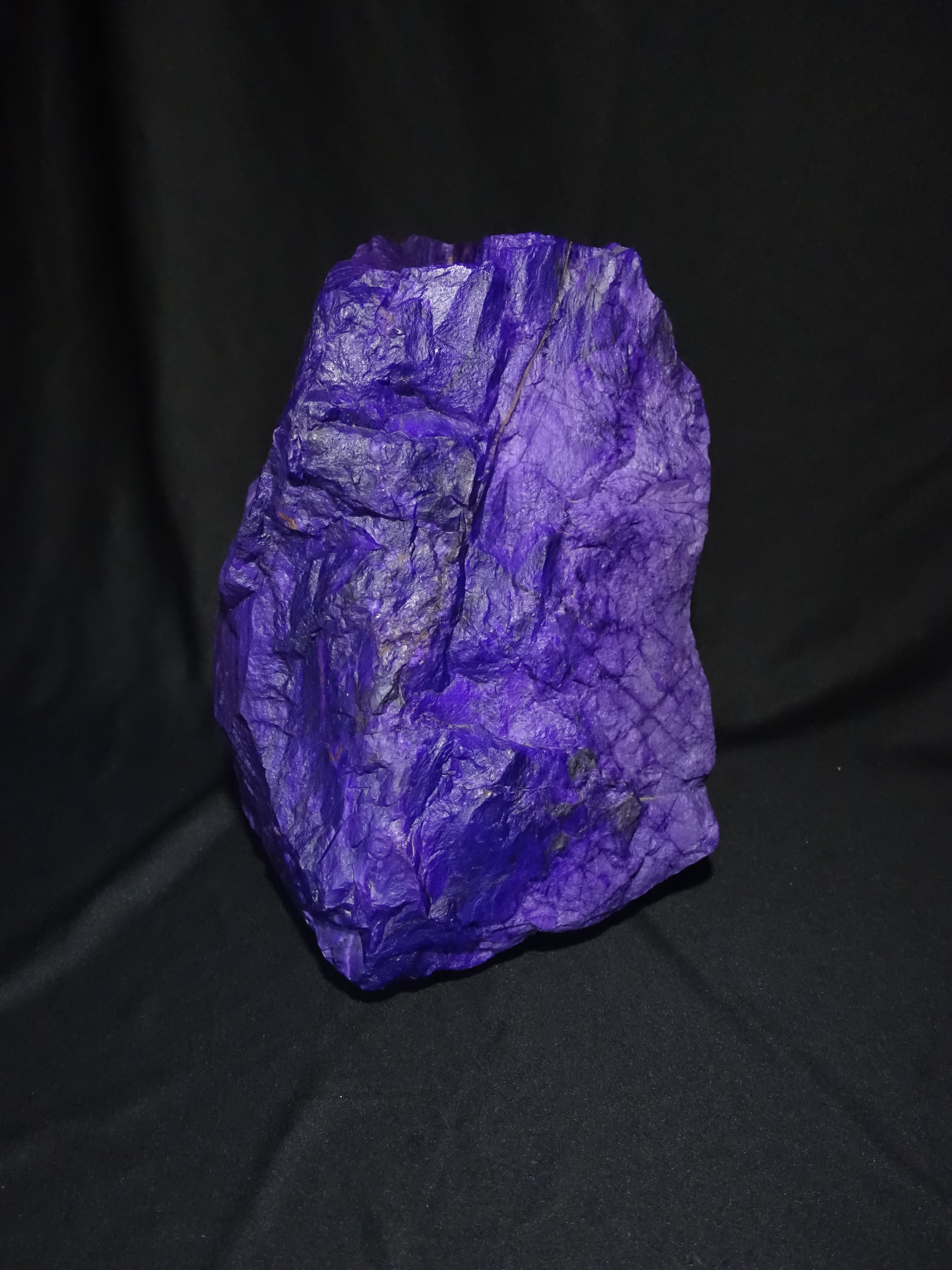
- 16kg Manganoan Sugilite, GIA Laboratory Certified, Smithsonian Exhibition Stone, I.Kurgan Royal Azel, Hall of Gems Smithsonian Museum 1981, Wessels Mine in Northern Cape Province, South Africa

General
- Category: Cyclosilicate
- Formula: KNa_{2}(Fe,Mn,Al)_{2}Li_{3}Si_{12}O_{30}
- IMA symbol: Sug
- Strunz classification: 9.CM.05
- Dana classification: 63.02.01a.09
- Crystal system: Hexagonal
- Crystal class: Dihexagonal dipyramidal (6/mmm); H-M symbol: (6/m 2/m 2/m)
- Space group: P6/mcc
- Unit cell: a = 10, c = 14 [Å]; Z = 2

Identification
- Color: Light brownish-yellow, purple, violet, reddish violet, pale pink, colorless
- Crystal habit: Prismatic crystals, typically granular to massive
- Cleavage: Poor on {0001}
- Mohs scale hardness: 6–6 1/2
- Luster: Vitreous
- Streak: White
- Diaphaneity: Transparent to translucent
- Specific gravity: 2.74
- Optical properties: Uniaxial (−)
- Refractive index: n_{ω} = 1.610 n_{ε} = 1.607
- Birefringence: δ = 0.003
- Pleochroism: Weak

Sugilite (/ˈsuːɡəlaɪt, -dʒi-/ SOO-gə-lyte, -jee-) is a relatively rare pink to purple cyclosilicate mineral with the complex chemical formula KNa_{2}(Fe, Mn, Al)_{2}Li_{3}Si_{12}O_{30}. Sugilite crystallizes in the hexagonal system with prismatic crystals. The crystals are rarely found and the form is usually massive. It has a Mohs hardness of 5.5–6.5 and a specific gravity of 2.75–2.80. It is mostly translucent. Sugilite was first described in 1944 by the Japanese petrologist Ken-ichi Sugi (1901–1948) for an occurrence on Iwagi Islet, Japan, where it is found in an aegirine syenite intrusive stock. It is found in a similar environment at Mont Saint-Hilaire, Quebec, Canada. In the Wessels mine in Northern Cape Province of South Africa, sugilite is mined from a strata-bound manganese deposit. It is also reported from Liguria and Tuscany, Italy; New South Wales, Australia and Madhya Pradesh, India.

Sugilite is commonly pronounced with a soft "g", as in "ginger". However, as with most minerals, its pronunciation is intended to be the same as the person it is named after; in this case, the Japanese name Sugi has a hard "g", as in "geese".

The mineral is also referred to as lavulite, luvulite, and royal azel by gem and mineral collectors.

In Japan, sugilite is found as yellowish-white to colourless, and is not good for jewellery.

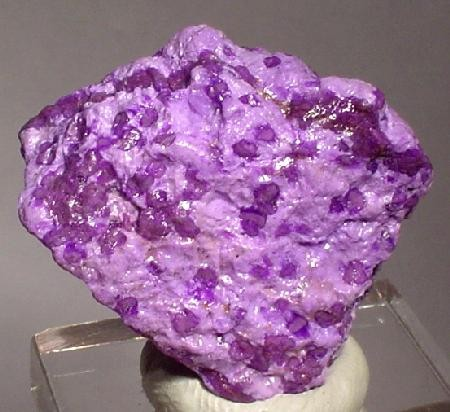
Sugilite on Matrix, Wessels Mine in Northern Cape Province, South Africa, size: 2.4 × 2.1 × 1.2 cm

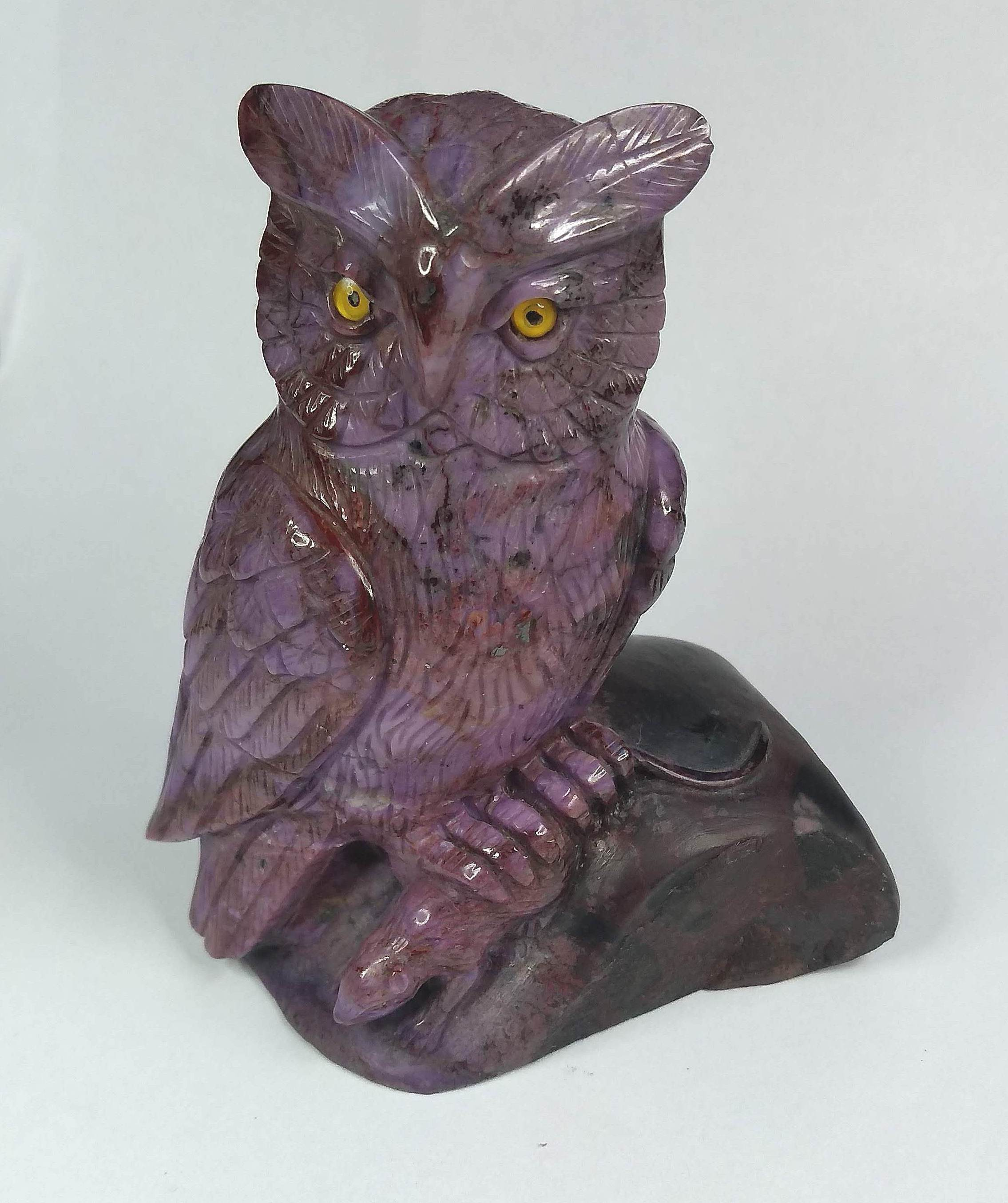
Sugilite owl and mouse, height 9 cm (3.5 in)

== See also ==
- List of minerals
- List of minerals named after people
