= List of minerals recognized by the International Mineralogical Association (N) =

This list includes those recognised minerals beginning with the letter N. The International Mineralogical Association is the international group that recognises new minerals and new mineral names; however, minerals discovered before 1959 did not go through the official naming procedure, although some minerals published previously have been either confirmed or discredited since that date. This list contains a mixture of mineral names that have been approved since 1959 and those mineral names believed to still refer to valid mineral species (these are called "grandfathered" species).

The list is divided into groups:

- Introduction • (Main synonyms)
- A • B • C • D • E • F • G • H • I • J • K • L • M • N • O • P–Q • R • S • T • U–V • W–X • Y–Z

The data was exported from mindat.org on 29 April 2005; updated up to 'IMA2021'.

The minerals are sorted by name, followed by the structural group (rruff.info/ima and ima-cnmnc by mineralienatlas.de, mainly) or chemical class (mindat.org and basics), the year of publication (if it's before of an IMA approval procedure), the IMA approval and the Strunz-mindat code. The first link is to mindat.org, the second link is to webmineral.com, and the third is to the Handbook of Mineralogy (Mineralogical Society of America).

- Abbreviations:
  - ^{D} – discredited (IMA/CNMNC status).
  - ^{Q} – questionable/ doubtful (IMA/CNMNC, mindat.org or mineralienatlas.de status).
  - ^{N} – published without approval of the IMA/CNMNC, or just not an IMA approved mineral but with some acceptance in the scientific community nowadays.
  - ^{I} – intermediate member of a solid-solution series.
  - ^{H} – hypothetical mineral (synthetic, anthropogenic, suspended approval procedure, etc.)
    - ^{ch} – incomplete description, hypothetical solid solution end member.
  - Rd – redefinition of ...
  - "s.p." – special procedure.
  - group – a name used to designate a group of species, sometimes only a mineral group name.
  - no – no link available.
  - IUPAC – chemical name.
  - Y: NNNN – year of publication.
  - Y: old – known before publications were available.

== N ==
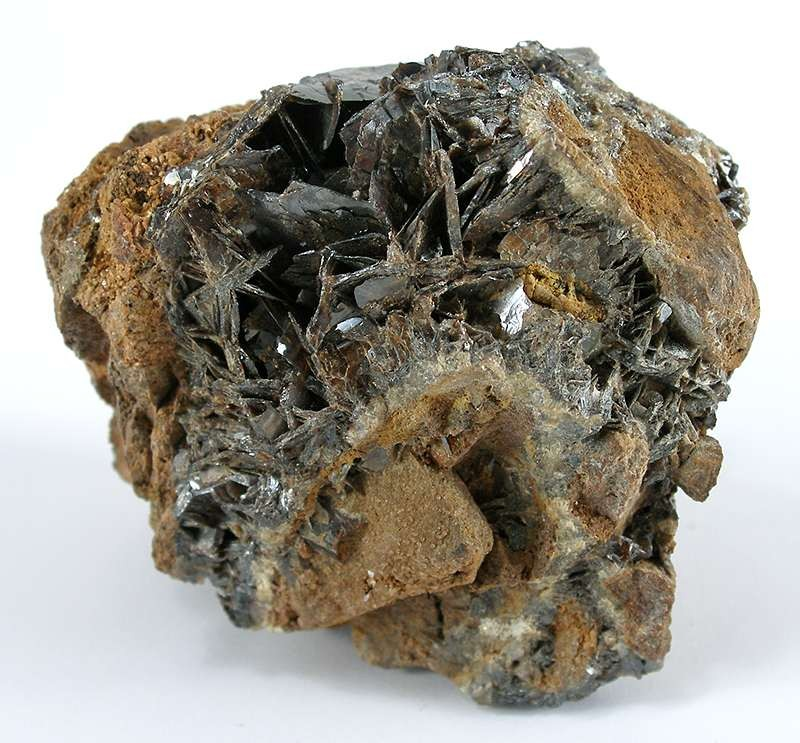
Nadorite crystals

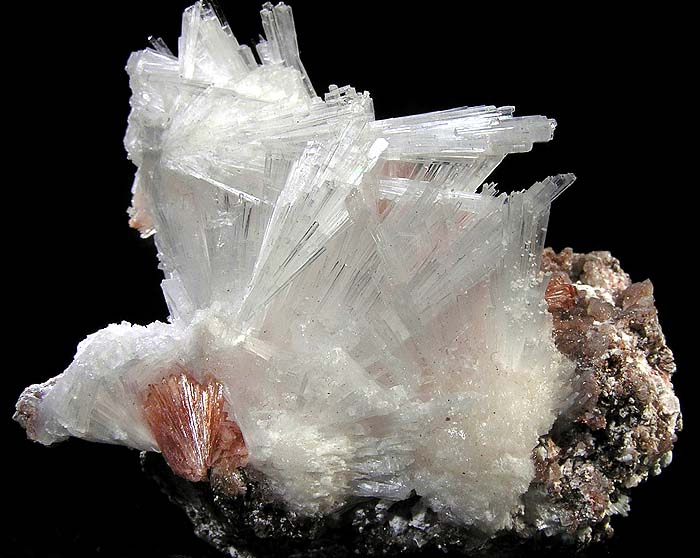
Natrolite from Wessels Mine, Hotazel, Kalahari manganese fields, Northern Cape Province, South Africa

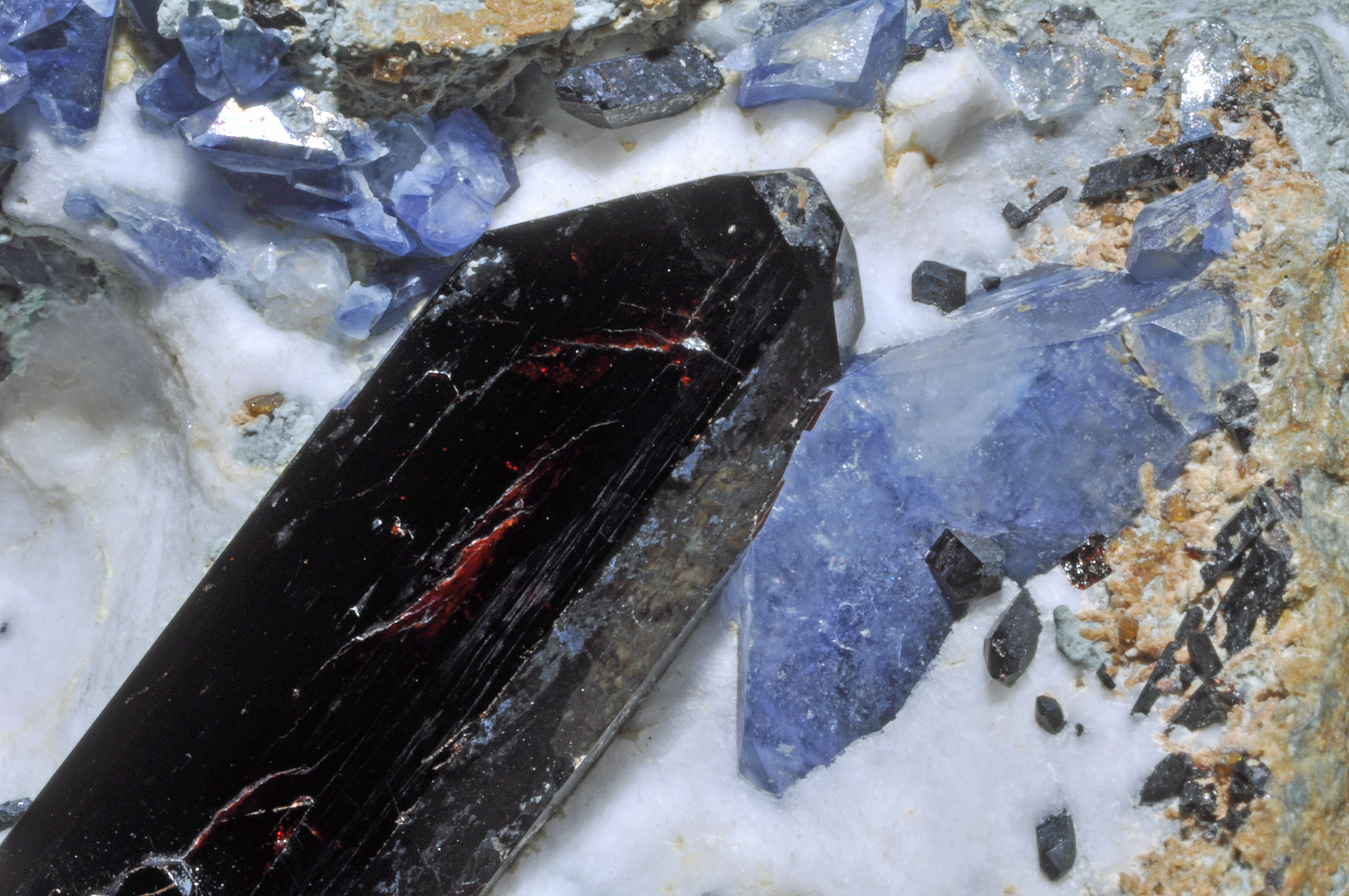
Benitoite (blue), neptunite (center), joaquinite over natrolite and serpentine (USA)

1. Nabalamprophyllite (lamprophyllite, seidozerite: IMA2001-060) 9.BE.25
2. Nabaphite (IMA1981-058) 8.CJ.15
  (IUPAC: sodium barium phosphate nonahydrate)
3. Nabateaite (IMA2021-026) 8.FA. [no] [no]
4. Nabesite (IMA2000-024) 9.EA.65 [no]
  (IUPAC: disodium beryllium decaoxytetrasilicate tetrahydrate)
5. Nabiasite (IMA1997-050) 8.BF.20
  (IUPAC: barium nonamanganese dihydro hexavanadate)
6. Nabimusaite (nabimusaite, arctite: IMA2012-057) 9.A?. [no] [no]
  (IUPAC: potassium dodecacalcium tetra(tetraoxysilicate) disulfate dioxofluoride)
7. Nabokoite (IMA1985-013a) 7.BC.20
  (IUPAC: potassium heptacopper oxochloro tellurate(IV) pentasulfate)
8. Nacaphite (IMA1979-026) 8.BO.05
  (IUPAC: disodium calcium fluoro phosphate)
9. Nacareniobsite-(Ce) (rinkite, seidozerite: IMA1987-040) 9.BE.20
10. Nacrite (Y: 1807) 9.ED.05
  (IUPAC: dialuminium pentaoxydisilicate tetrahydroxyl)
11. Nadorite (nadorite: 1870) 3.DC.30
  (IUPAC: lead antimony(III) dioxochloride)
12. Nafeasite (IMA2021-103) 8.CF. [no] [no]
13. Nafertisite (IMA1994-007) 9.EH.30 [no]
14. Nagashimalite (IMA1977-045) 9.CE.20
15. Nagelschmidtite (IMA1987 s.p., 1942) 9.HA.60
  (IUPAC: heptacalcium di(tetraoxosilicate) diphosphate)
16. Nagyágite (Y: 1845) 2.HB.20a
17. Nahcolite (Y: 1929) 5.AA.15
  (IUPAC: sodium bicarbonate)
18. Nahpoite (IMA1981-002) 8.AD.05
  (IUPAC: disodium hydroxophosphate)
19. Nakauriite (IMA1976-016) 7.DG.30
  (IUPAC: octacopper hexahydro tetrasulfate carbonate octatetracontahydrate)
20. Nakkaalaaqite (IMA2020-059) 9.CJ. [no] [no]
21. Naldrettite (IMA2004-007) 2.AC.25d
  (IUPAC: dipalladium antimonide)
22. Nalipoite (IMA1990-030) 8.AA.25
  (IUPAC: sodium dilithium phosphate)
23. Nalivkinite (IMA2006-038) 9.DC.05 [no]
24. Namansilite (IMA1989-026) 9.DA.25
  (IUPAC: sodium manganese(III) hexaoxydisilicate)
25. Nambulite (rhodonite: IMA1971-032) 9.DK.05
  (IUPAC: lithium tetramanganese(II) tetradecaoxypentasilicate hydroxyl)
26. Namibite (IMA1981-024) 8.BB.50
  (IUPAC: copper dioxobismuth hydro vanadate)
27. Namuwite (ktenasite: IMA1981-020) 7.DD.50
  (IUPAC: tetrazinc hexahydro sulfate tetrahydrate)
28. Nanlingite (IMA1985-xxx ?, 1976) 4.JB.25
29. Nanpingite (mica: IMA1987-006) 9.EC.15
  (IUPAC: cesium dialuminium (aluminotrisilicate) decaoxydedihydroxyl)
30. Nantokite (sphalerite: 1867) 3.AA.05
  (IUPAC: copper chloride)
31. Naquite (silicide: IMA2010-010) 1.BB.15 [no]
  (IUPAC: iron silicide)
32. Narsarsukite (IMA1967 s.p., 1901) 9.DJ.05
33. Nashite (IMA2011-105) 8.0 [no]
34. Nasinite (IMA1967 s.p., 1961) 6.EC.05
  (IUPAC: disodium hydro octaoxodiborate dihydrate)
35. Nasledovite^{Q} (alumohydrocalcite: 1959) 5.DB.05
36. Nasonite (Y: 1899) 9.BE.77
  (IUPAC: dicalcium hexalead tri(heptaoxodisilicate) dichloride)
37. Nastrophite (IMA1980-051) 8.CJ.15
  (IUPAC: sodium strontium phosphate nonahydrate)
38. Nataliakulikite (perovskite: IMA2018-061) 9.0 [no] [no]
39. Nataliyamalikite (IMA2016-022) 3.0 [no] [no]
  (IUPAC: thallium(I) iodide)
40. Natalyite (pyroxene: IMA1984-053) 9.DA.25
  (IUPAC: sodium vanadium(III) hexaoxydisilicate)
41. Natanite (perovskite, schoenfliesite: IMA1980-028) 4.FC.10
  (IUPAC: iron(II) tin(IV) hexahydroxide)
42. Natisite (IMA1974-035) 9.AG.40a
43. Natrite (IMA1981-005) 5.AA.10
  (IUPAC: disodium carbonate)
44. Natroalunite (alunite: IMA1987 s.p., 1902 Rd) 7.BC.10
  (IUPAC: sodium trialuminium hexahydro disulfate)
45. Natroaphthitalite (aphthitalite: IMA2018-091) 7.0 [no] [no]
  (IUPAC: potassium trisodium disulfate)
46. Natroboltwoodite (IMA2007 s.p., 1975) 9.AK.15
  (IUPAC: sodium uranyl (trioxyhydroxyl silicate) monohydrate)
47. Natrochalcite (tsumcorite: 1908) 7.DF.15
  (IUPAC: sodium dicopper hydro disulfate monohydrate)
48. Natrodufrénite (dufrénite: IMA1981-033) 8.DK.15
  (IUPAC: sodium iron(II) pentairon(III) hexahydro tetraphosphate dihydrate)
49. Natroglaucocerinite^{Q} (woodwardite: IMA1995-025) 7.DD.35 [no]
50. Natrojarosite (alunite, alunite: IMA1987 s.p., 1902 Rd) 7.BC.10
  (IUPAC: sodium triiron(III) hexahydro disulfate)
51. Natrokomarovite^{N} (komarovite: 1979) 9.CE.45 [no]
52. Natrolemoynite (lemoynite: IMA1996-063) 9.DP.35 [no]
  (IUPAC: tetrasodium dizirconium decasilicate hexacosaoxy hydrate)
53. Natrolite (zeolitic tectosilicate: IMA1997 s.p., 1803) 9.GA.05
54. Natromarkeyite (markeyite: IMA2018-152) 5.0 [no] [no]
55. Natron (IMA1967 s.p., 1783) 5.CB.10
  (IUPAC: disodium carbonate decahydrate)
56. Natronambulite (rhodonite: IMA1981-034) 9.DK.05
57. Natroniobite^{Q} (oxide perovskite: 1962) 4.CC.30
  (IUPAC: sodium niobium trioxide)
58. Natropalermoite (carminite: IMA2013-118) 8.0 [no] [no]
  (IUPAC: disodium strontium tetraluminium tetrahydro tetraphosphate)
59. Natropharmacoalumite (pharmacosiderite: IMA2010-009) 8.DK.12 [no]
  (IUPAC: sodium tetraluminium tetrahydro triarsenate tetrahydrate)
60. Natropharmacosiderite (pharmacosiderite: IMA1983-025) 8.DK.10
  (IUPAC: disodium tetrairon(III) pentahydro triarsenate heptahydrate)
61. Natrophilite (olivine: 1890) 8.AB.10
  (IUPAC: sodium manganese(II) phosphate)
62. Natrophosphate (IMA1971-041) 8.DN.05
  (IUPAC: heptasodium fluoro diphosphate nonadecahydrate)
63. Natrosilite (IMA1974-043) 9.EE.40
  (IUPAC: disodium pentaoxydisilicate)
64. Natrosulfatourea (IMA2019-134) 10.0 [no] [no]
65. Natrotantite (IMA1980-026) 4.DJ.05
  (IUPAC: disodium tetratantalium undecaoxide)
66. Natrotitanite (titanite: IMA2011-033) 9.AG.15 [no]
67. Natrouranospinite (natroautunite: IMA2007 s.p., 1957) 8.EB.15
  (IUPAC: disodium diuranyl diarsenate pentahydrate)
68. Natrowalentaite (walentaite: IMA2018-032a) 8.0 [no] [no]
69. Natroxalate (oxalate: IMA1994-053) 10.AB.60
  (IUPAC: disodium oxalate)
70. Natrozippeite (zippeite: IMA1971-004) 7.EC.05
  (IUPAC: pentasodium octauranyl trihydro pentaoxo tetrasulfate dodecahydrate)
71. Naujakasite (Y: 1933) 9.EG.10
72. Naumannite (Y: 1828) 2.BA.55
  (IUPAC: disilver selenide)
73. Navajoite (ajoite: 1954) 4.HG.30
74. Navrotskyite (IMA2019-026) 7.0 [no] [no]
75. Nazarchukite (IMA2022-005) 8.AC. [no] [no]
76. Nazarovite (phosphide: IMA2019-013) 1.0 [no] [no]
77. Nchwaningite (IMA1994-002) 9.DB.30 [no]
  (IUPAC: dimanganese trioxosilicate dihydroxyl monohydrate)
78. Nealite (IMA1979-050) 4.JD.05 [no]
  (IUPAC: tetralead iron tetrachloro diarsenite dihydrate)
79. Nechelyustovite (seidozerite, lamprophyllite: IMA2006-021) 09.BE.55 [no]
80. Nefedovite (IMA1982-048) 8.BO.30
  (IUPAC: pentasodium tetracalcium fluoro tetraphosphate)
81. Negevite (phosphide: IMA2013-104) 1.0 [no] [no]
  (IUPAC: nickel diphosphide)
82. Neighborite (perovskite: IMA1967 s.p., 1961) 3.AA.35
  (IUPAC: sodium magnesium trifluoride)
83. Nekoite (Y: 1956) 9.EA.45
  (IUPAC: tricalcium pentadecaoxyhexasilicate heptahydrate)
84. Nekrasovite (germanite: IMA1983-051) 2.CB.30
  (Cu_{13}VSn_{3}S_{16})
85. Nelenite (pyrosmalite: IMA1982-011) 9.EE.15
86. Neltnerite (braunite: IMA1979-059) 9.AG.05
  (IUPAC: calcium hexamagnesium(III) octaoxy(tetraoxysilicate))
87. Nenadkevichite (labuntsovite: 1955) 9.CE.30a
88. Neotocite (allophane: 1849) 9.ED.20
89. Nepheline (feldspathoid, nepheline: 1801) 9.FA.05
  (IUPAC: potassium trisodium (hexadecaoxytetralumotetrasilicate))
90. Népouite (serpentine: 1907) 9.ED.15
  (IUPAC: trinickel pentaoxodisilicate tetrahydroxyl)
91. Nepskoeite (IMA1996-016) 3.BD.20 [no]
  (IUPAC: tetramagnesium heptahydroxide chloride hexahydrate)
92. Neptunite (neptunite: 1893) 9.EH.05
93. Neskevaaraite-Fe (labuntsovite: IMA2002-007) 9.CE.30h
94. Nesquehonite (Y: 1890) 5.CA.05
  (IUPAC: magnesium carbonate trihydrate)
95. Nestolaite (IMA2013-074) 4.0 [no] [no]
  (IUPAC: calcium selenite monohydrate)
96. Neustädtelite (IMA1998-016) 8.BK.10
97. Nevadaite (IMA2002-035) 8.DC.60
98. Nevskite (tetradymite: IMA1983-026) 2.DC.05
  (IUPAC: bismuth (selenide,sulfide))
99. Newberyite (Y: 1879) 8.CE.10
  (IUPAC: magnesium hydroxophosphate trihydrate)
100. Neyite (sulphosalt, neyite: IMA1968-017) 2.JB.25i
  (Ag_{2}Cu_{6}Pb_{25}Bi_{26}S_{68})
101. Nežilovite (magnetoplumbite: IMA1994-020) 4.CC.45 [no]
102. Niahite (IMA1977-022) 8.CH.20
  (IUPAC: ammonium manganese(II) phosphate monohydrate)
103. Niasite (IMA2019-105) 8.0 [no] [no]
  (Ni^{2+}_{4.5}(AsO_{4})_{3})
104. Nichromite^{N} (spinel: 1978) 4.BB.05 [no]
105. Nickel (IMA1966-039) 1.AA.05
106. Nickelalumite^{N} (chalcoalumite: 1980) 7.DD.75 [no]
107. Nickelaustinite (adelite: IMA1985-002) 8.BH.35
  (IUPAC: calcium nickel hydro arsenate)
108. Nickelbischofite (IMA1978-056) 3.BB.20
  (IUPAC: nickel dichloride hexahydrate)
109. Nickelblödite (blödite: IMA1976-014) 7.CC.50
  (IUPAC: disodium nickel disulfate tetrahydrate)
110. Nickelboussingaultite (picromerite: IMA1975-037) 7.CC.60
  (IUPAC: diammonium nickel disulfate hexahydrate)
111. Nickelhexahydrite (hexahydrite: IMA1968 s.p., 1965) 7.CB.25
  (IUPAC: nickel sulfate hexahydrate)
112. Nickeline (nickeline: IMA1967 s.p., 1832) 2.CC.05
  (IUPAC: nickel arsenide)
113. Nickellotharmeyerite (tsumcorite: IMA1999-008) 8.CG.15 [no]
  (IUPAC: calcium dinickel diarsenate dihydrate)
114. Nickelphosphide (phosphide: IMA1998-023) 1.BD.05
  (IUPAC: trinickel phosphide)
115. Nickelpicromerite (picromerite: IMA2012-053) 7.CC. [no] [no]
  (IUPAC: dipotassium nickel disulfate hexahydrate)
116. Nickelschneebergite (tsumcorite: IMA1999-028) 8.CG.15
  (IUPAC: bismuth dinickel hydro diarsenate hydrate)
117. Nickelskutterudite (perovskite, skutterudite: IMA2007 s.p., 1893) 2.EC.05
118. Nickeltalmessite (fairfieldite: IMA2008-051) 8.CG.35 [no]
  (IUPAC: dicalcium nickel diarsenate dihydrate)
119. Nickeltsumcorite (tsumcorite: IMA2013-117) 8.0 [no] [no]
120. Nickeltyrrellite (seleniospinel: IMA2018-110) 2.0 [no] [no]
  (IUPAC: copper dinickel tetraselenide)
121. Nickelzippeite (zippeite: IMA1971-005) 7.EC.05
  (IUPAC: dinickel hexauranyl decahydro trisulfate hexadecahydrate)
122. Nickenichite (alluaudite: IMA1992-014) 8.AC.10
  (Na(Ca_{0.5}Cu_{0.5})MgMg_{2}(AsO_{4})_{3})
123. Nickolayite (phosphide: IMA2018-126) 1.0 [no] [no]
  (IUPAC: iron molybdenum phosphide)
124. Nicksobolevite (IMA2012-097) 4.0 [no] [no]
  (IUPAC: heptacopper dioxohexachloro diselenite)
125. Niedermayrite (IMA1997-024) 7.DD.30
  (IUPAC: tetracopper cadmium hexahydro disulfate tetrahydrate)
126. Nielsbohrite (IMA2002-045b) 8.0
127. Nielsenite (alloy: IMA2004-046) 1.AG.70
  (IUPAC: palladium tricopper alloy)
128. Nierite (nitride: IMA1994-032) 1.DB.05
  (IUPAC: trisilicon tetranitride)
129. Nifontovite (IMA1967 s.p., 1961) 6.CA.50
  (IUPAC: tricalcium hexa[dihydroxoborate] dihydrate)
130. Niggliite (tin alloy: 1938) 1.AG.60
  (IUPAC: platinum stannide)
131. Niigataite (epidote, clinozoisite: IMA2001-055) 9.BG.05 [no]
  (IUPAC: calcium strontium trialuminium (heptaoxodisilicate) (tetraoxosilicate) hydroxyl)
132. Nikischerite (hydrotalcite, wermlandite: IMA2001-039) 7.DD.35 [no]
133. Nikmelnikovite (garnet: IMA2018-043) 4.0 [no] [no]
134. Niksergievite (IMA2002-036) 9.EC.75 [no]
135. Nimite (chlorite: IMA1971 s.p., IMA1969-012) 9.EC.55
136. Ningyoite (rhabdophane: IMA1962 s.p., 1959) 8.CJ.85
137. Niningerite (rocksalt, galena: IMA1966-036) 2.CD.10
  (IUPAC: magnesium sulfide)
138. Nioboaeschynite (aeschynite) 4.DF.05
  1. Nioboaeschynite-(Ce) (IMA1987 s.p., 1960) 4.DF.05
  2. Nioboaeschynite-(Y) (IMA2003-038a) 4.DF.05
139. Niobocarbide (carbide: IMA1995-035) 1.BA.20
  (IUPAC: niobium carbide)
140. Nioboheftetjernite (wolframite: IMA2019-133) 4.0 [no] [no]
141. Nioboholtite (dumortierite: IMA2012-068) 9.A?. [no] [no]
142. Niobokupletskite (astrophyllite, kupletskite: IMA1999-032) 9.DC.05 [no]
143. Niobophyllite (astrophyllite, astrophyllite: IMA1964-001) 9.DC.05
144. Niocalite (wöhlerite: 1956) 9.BE.17
  (IUPAC: heptacalcium niobium heptaoxodisilicate trioxofluoride)
145. Nipalarsite (IMA2018-075) 2.0 [no] [no]
  (IUPAC: octanickel tripalladium tetrarsenide)
146. Nisbite (löllingite: IMA1969-017) 2.EB.15a
  (IUPAC: nickel diantimonide)
147. Nishanbaevite (IMA2019-012) 8.0 [no] [no]
148. Nisnite (auricupride: IMA2009-083) 1.0 [no] [no]
  (IUPAC: trinickel tin alloy)
149. Nissonite (IMA1966-026) 8.DC.05
  (IUPAC: dicopper dimagnesium dihydro diphosphate pentahydrate)
150. Niter (nitrate: old) 5.NA.10
  (IUPAC: potassium nitrate)
151. Nitratine (calcite: IMA1980 s.p., 1845) 5.NA.05
  (IUPAC: sodium nitrate)
152. Nitrobarite (nitrate: 1882) 5.NA.20
  (IUPAC: barium dinitrate)
153. Nitrocalcite (nitrate: 1783) 5.NC.10
  (IUPAC: calcium dinitrate tetrahydrate)
154. Nitromagnesite (nitrate: 1783) 5.NC.05
  (IUPAC: magnesium dinitrate hexahydrate)
155. Nitroplumbite (nitrate: IMA2021-045a) 5.NB. [no] [no]
156. Nitscheite (IMA2020-078) 7.0 [no] [no]
157. Niveolanite (IMA2007-032) 5.DC.35
  (IUPAC: sodium beryllium hydro carbonate dihydrate)
158. Nixonite (IMA2018-133) 4.0 [no] [no]
159. Nizamoffite (hopeite: IMA2012-076) 8.0 [no] [no]
160. Nobleite (IMA1967 s.p., 1961) 6.FC.05
161. Noelbensonite (IMA1994-058 Rd) 9.BE.05 [no]
162. Nöggerathite-(Ce) (zirconolite: IMA2017-107) 4.0 [no] [no]
163. Nolanite (nolanite: 1957) 4.CB.40
164. Nollmotzite (IMA2017-100) 4.0 [no] [no]
165. Nolzeite (IMA2014-086) 9.0 [no] [no]
166. Nontronite (montmorillonite, smectite: IMA1962 s.p., 1928) 9.EC.40
167. Noonkanbahite (batisite: IMA2009-059) 9.DH. [no]
168. Norbergite (humite: 1926) 9.AF.40
169. Nordenskiöldine (Y: 1887) 6.AA.15
  (IUPAC: calcium tin(IV) diborate)
170. Nordgauite (nordgauite: IMA2010-040) 8.DC.30 [no]
171. Nordite (nordite) 9.DO.15
  1. Nordite-(Ce) (IMA1966 s.p., 1958) 9.DO.15 [no]
  2. Nordite-(La) (IMA1987 s.p., 1941) 9.DO.15
172. Nordstrandite (IMA1967 s.p., 1958) 4.FE.10
  (IUPAC: aluminium trihydroxide)
173. Nordströmite (IMA1978-073) 2.JB.25c
  (Pb_{3}CuBi_{7}(S,Se)_{14})
174. Norilskite (alloy: IMA2015-008) 1.0 [no] [no]
  (IUPAC: hepta(palladium,silver) tetralead alloy)
175. Normandite (wöhlerite: IMA1990-021) 9.BE.17 [no]
176. Norrishite (mica: IMA1989-019) 9.EC.20
  (IUPAC: potassium lithium dimanganese(III) dioxy dedecaoxytetrasilicate)
177. Norsethite (IMA1962 s.p.) 5.AB.30
  (IUPAC: barium magnesium dicarbonate)
178. Northstarite (IMA2019-031) 7.0 [no] [no]
179. Northupite (northupite: 1895) 5.BF.05
  (IUPAC: trisodium magnesium chloro dicarbonate)
180. Nosean (sodalite: 1815) 9.FB.10
181. Nováčekite (IMA2007 s.p., 1951, 2022) 8.EB.05
  (IUPAC: magnesium diuranyl diarsenate decahydrate)
182. Novákite (metalloid alloy: IMA1967 s.p., 1961) 2.AA.15
  ((Cu,Ag)_{21}As_{10})
183. Novgorodovaite (oxalate: IMA2000-039) 10.AB.80 [no]
  (IUPAC: dicalcium dichloro oxalate dihydrate)
184. Novodneprite (khatyrkite: IMA2002-032a) 1.AA.15 [no]
  (IUPAC: gold trilead alloy)
185. Novograblenovite (carnallite: IMA2017-060) 3.0 [no] [no]
  (IUPAC: (ammonium,potassium) magnesium trichloride hexahydrate)
186. Nowackiite (nowackiite: IMA1971 s.p., 1965) 2.GA.30
  (Cu_{6}Zn_{3}As_{4}S_{12})
187. Nsutite (ramsdellite: IMA1967 s.p., 1962) 4.DB.15c
188. Nuffieldite (kobellite: IMA1967-003) 2.JB.25g
  (Cu_{1.4}Pb_{2.4}Bi_{2.4}Sb_{0.2}S_{7})
189. Nukundamite (IMA1978-037) 2.CA.10
  (Cu_{3.4}Fe_{0.6}S_{4})
190. Nullaginite (malachite: IMA1978-011) 5.BA.10
  (IUPAC: dinickel dihydro carbonate)
191. Numanoite (IMA2005-050) 6.DA.40
192. Nuragheite (IMA2013-088) 7.0 [no] [no]
  (IUPAC: thorium dimolybdate monohydrate)
193. Nuwaite (nuwaite: IMA2013-018) 2.0 [no] [no]
  (IUPAC: hexanickel germanium disulfide)
194. Nyboite [Na-amphibole: IMA2012 s.p., IMA1997 s.p., 1981] 9.DE.25
195. Nyerereite (fairchildite: IMA1963-014) 5.AC.10
  (IUPAC: disodium calcium dicarbonate)
196. Nyholmite (hureaulite: IMA2008-047) 8.CB.10 [no]
  (IUPAC: tricadmium dizinc dihydroxoarsenate diarsenate tetrahydrate)
