= List of minerals recognized by the International Mineralogical Association (J) =

This list includes those recognised minerals beginning with the letter J. The International Mineralogical Association is the international group that recognises new minerals and new mineral names; however, minerals discovered before 1959 did not go through the official naming procedure, although some minerals published previously have been either confirmed or discredited since that date. This list contains a mixture of mineral names that have been approved since 1959 and those mineral names believed to still refer to valid mineral species (these are called "grandfathered" species).

The list is divided into groups:

- Introduction • (Main synonyms)
- A • B • C • D • E • F • G • H • I • J • K • L • M • N • O • P–Q • R • S • T • U–V • W–X • Y–Z

The data was exported from mindat.org on 29 April 2005; updated up to 'IMA2021'.

The minerals are sorted by name, followed by the structural group (rruff.info/ima and ima-cnmnc by mineralienatlas.de, mainly) or chemical class (mindat.org and basics), the year of publication (if it's before of an IMA approval procedure), the IMA approval and the Strunz-mindat code. The first link is to mindat.org, the second link is to webmineral.com, and the third is to the Handbook of Mineralogy (Mineralogical Society of America).

- Abbreviations:
  - ^{D} – discredited (IMA/CNMNC status).
  - ^{Q} – questionable/ doubtful (IMA/CNMNC, mindat.org or mineralienatlas.de status).
  - ^{N} – published without approval of the IMA/CNMNC, or just not an IMA approved mineral but with some acceptance in the scientific community nowadays.
  - ^{I} – intermediate member of a solid-solution series.
  - ^{H} – hypothetical mineral (synthetic, anthropogenic, suspended approval procedure, etc.)
    - ^{ch} – incomplete description, hypothetical solid solution end member.
  - Rd – redefinition of ...
  - "s.p." – special procedure.
  - group – a name used to designate a group of species, sometimes only a mineral group name.
  - no – no link available.
  - IUPAC – chemical name.
  - Y: NNNN – year of publication.
  - Y: old – known before publications were available.

== J ==
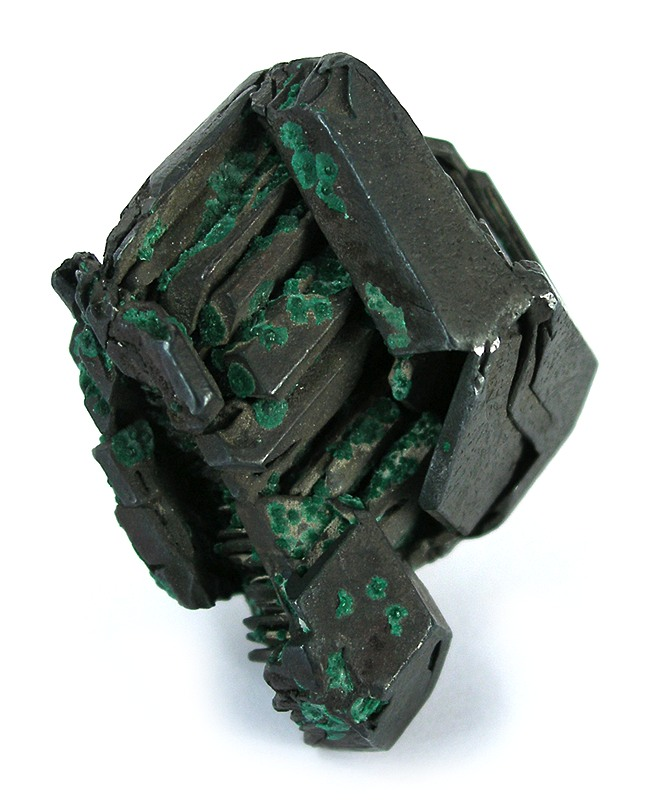
Jalpaite, Ag_{3}CuS_{2}, Jalpa, Municipio de Jalpa, Zacatecas, Mexico; size: 3.6 × 3.5 × 3.2 cm; from the type locality

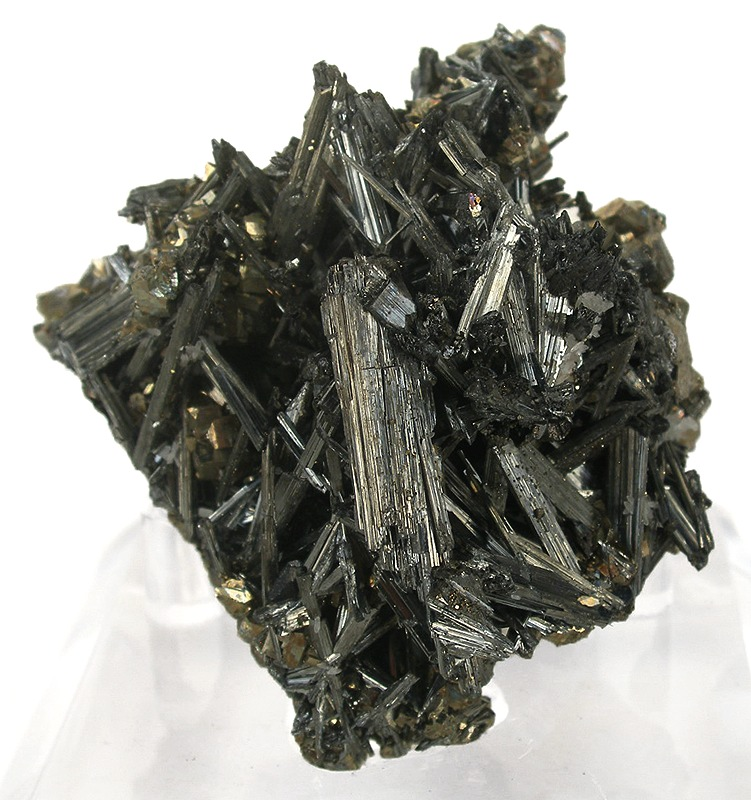
Jamesonite from Concepción del Oro, Zacatecas, Mexico; size: 5.0 × 4.8 × 4.7 cm

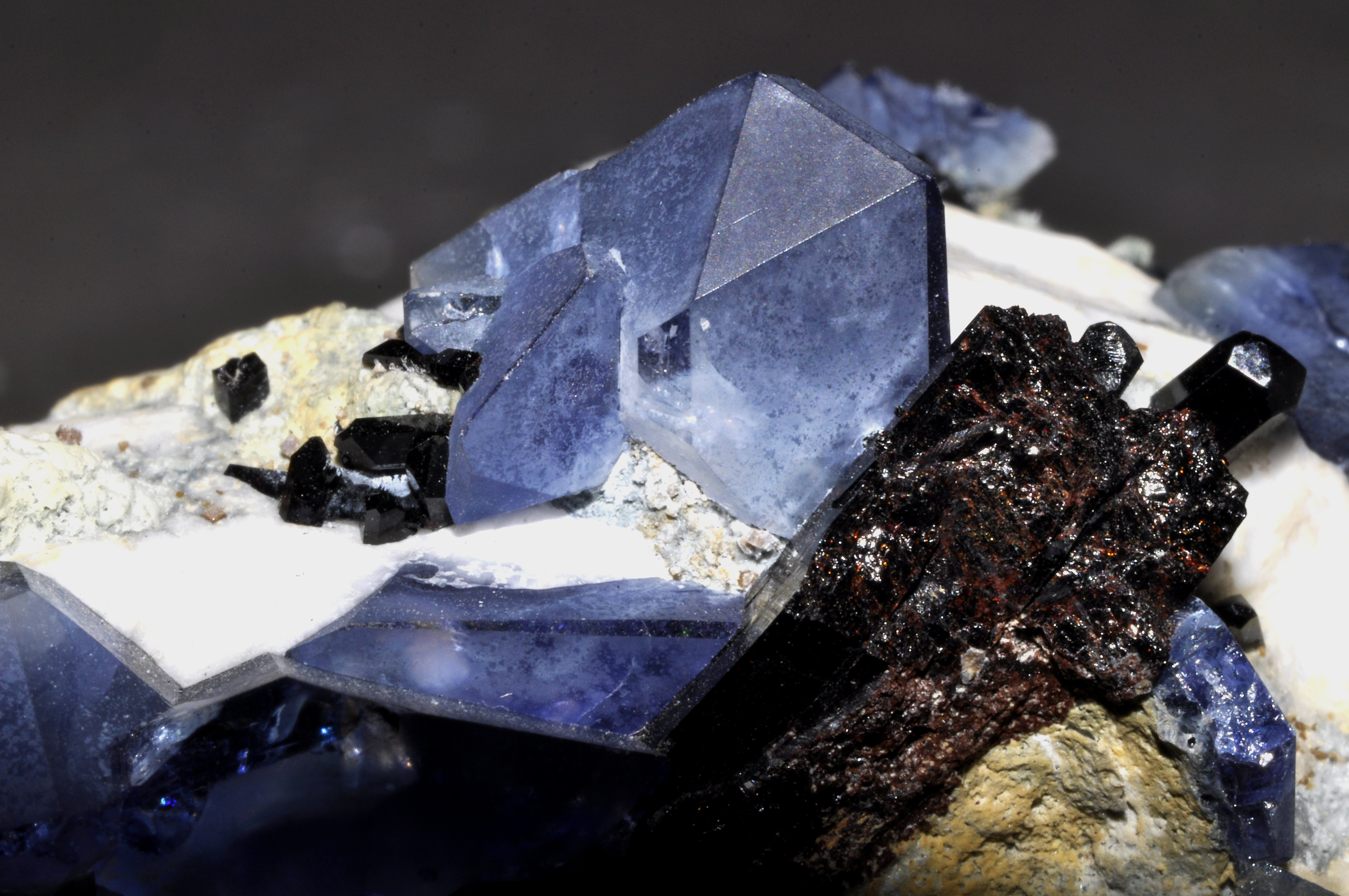
Benitoite (blue), joaquinite-(Ce) (brown) and neptunite (dark red) on natrolite (white)

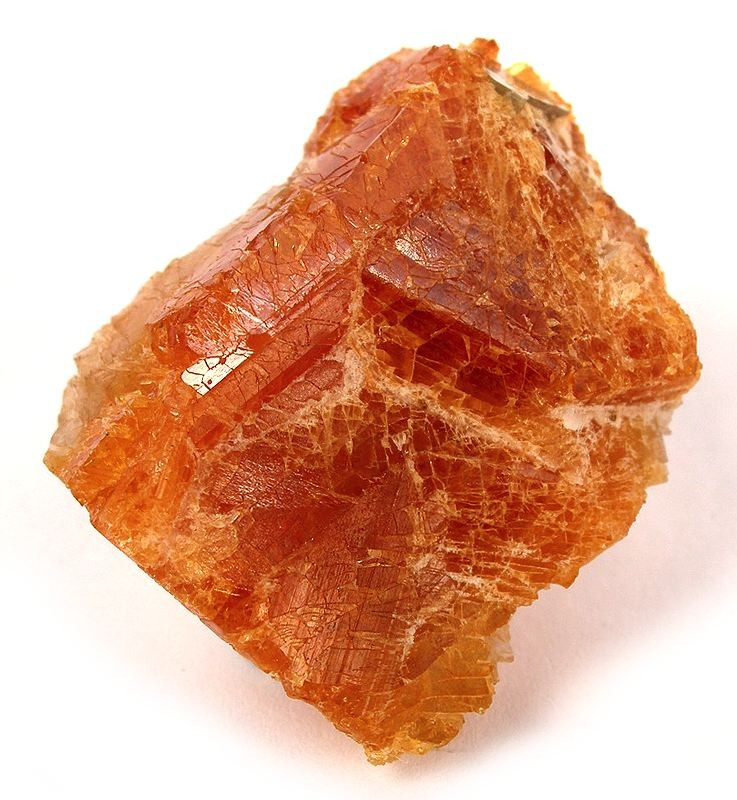
Johachidolite, a calcium aluminium borate, from Pein Pyit, Mogok, Mandalay Division, Burma; size: 3.5 × 3.0 × 1.6 cm

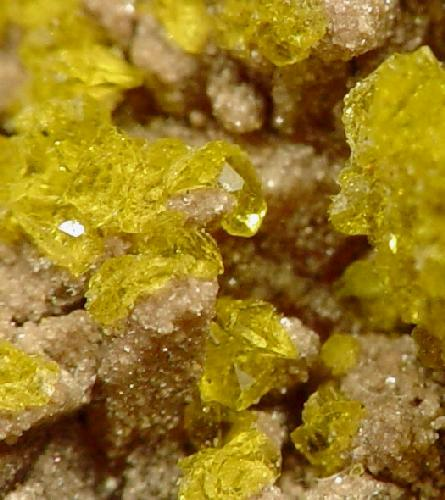
Jouravskite, a secondary manganese mineral, from N'Chwaning Mines, Kuruman, Kalahari manganese fields, Northern Cape Province, South Africa; gemmy yellow microcrystals, up to one mm

1. Jáchymovite (IMA1994-025) 7.EA.10
2. Jacobsite (spinel, spinel: IMA1982 s.p., 1869) 4.BB.05
  (IUPAC: manganese(II) diiron(III) tetraoxide)
3. Jacquesdietrichite (IMA2003-012) 6.AB.80
4. Jacutingaite (IMA2010-078) 2.0 [no]
  (IUPAC: diplatinum mercury triselenide)
5. Jadarite (IMA2006-036) 9.AJ.40
6. Jadeite (pyroxene: IMA1988 s.p., 1863) 9.DA.25
  (IUPAC: sodium aluminium hexaoxy disilicate)
7. Jaffeite (IMA1987-056) 9.BE.12
  (IUPAC: hexacalcium heptaoxy disilicate hexahydroxyl)
8. Jagoite (Y: 1957) 9.EG.50
9. Jagowerite (IMA1973-001) 8.BH.55
  (IUPAC: barium dialuminium dihydro diphosphate)
10. Jagüéite (chrisstanleyite: IMA2002-060) 2.BC.15 [no]
  (IUPAC: dicopper tripalladium tetraselenide)
11. Jahnsite (whiteite) 8.DH.15
  1. Jahnsite-(CaFeFe)^{N} (1995) 8.DH.15 [no] [no]
  2. Jahnsite-(CaFeMg) (IMA2013-111) 8.DH.15 [no] [no]
  3. Jahnsite-(CaMnFe) (IMA1978 s.p. Rd) 8.DH.15
  4. Jahnsite-(CaMnMg) (IMA1973-022 Rd) 8.DH.15
  5. Jahnsite-(CaMnMn) (IMA1987-020a) 8.DH.15
  6. Jahnsite-(CaMnZn) (IMA2019-073) 8.DH.15 [no] [no]
  7. Jahnsite-(MnMnFe) (IMA2018-096) 8.DH.15 [no] [no]
  8. Jahnsite-(MnMnMn) (IMA1978 s.p. Rd) 8.DH.15 [no]
  9. Jahnsite-(MnMnZn) (IMA2017-113) 8.DH.15 [no] [no]
  10. Jahnsite-(NaFeMg) (IMA2007-016) 8.DH.15 [no]
  11. Jahnsite-(NaMnMg) (IMA2018-017) 8.DH.15 [no]
  12. Jahnsite-(NaMnMn) (IMA2019-051) 8.DH.15 [no] [no]
12. Jaipurite^{Q} (nickeline: 1845) 2.CC.05 [no]
  (IUPAC: cobalt sulfide)
13. Jakobssonite (IMA2011-036) 3.0 [no]
  (IUPAC: calcium aluminium pentafluoride)
14. Jalpaite (Y: 1858) 2.BA.45
  (IUPAC: trisilver copper disulfide)
15. Jamborite (related to hydrotalcite supergroup (Rd): IMA2014-E, IMA1971-037) 4.FL.05
16. Jamesite (IMA1978-079) 8.BK.25
17. Jamesonite (Y: 1825) 2.HB.15
  (IUPAC: tetralead iron tetradecasulfa hexaantimonide)
18. Janchevite (asisite: IMA2017-079) 4.0 [no] [no]
19. Janggunite (IMA1975-011) 4.FG.05
20. Janhaugite (wöhlerite: IMA1981-018) 9.BE.17
21. Jankovićite (IMA1993-050) 2.HD.20
  (Tl_{5}Sb_{9}(As,Sb)_{4}S_{22})
22. Jarandolite (IMA1995-020c) 6.CB.25
  (IUPAC: calcium trihydro tetraoxo triborate)
23. Jarlite (jarlite: 1933) 3.CC.20
24. Jarosewichite (IMA1981-060) 8.BE.70
  (IUPAC: manganese(III) trimanganese(II) hexahydro arsenate)
25. Jarosite (alunite, alunite: IMA1987 s.p., 1852 Rd) 7.BC.10
  (IUPAC: potassium triiron(III) hexahydro disulfate)
26. Jaskólskiite (meneghinite: IMA1982-057) 2.HB.05c
  (Cu_{x}Pb_{(2+x)}(Sb,Bi)_{(2-x)}S_{5} (x ≈ 0.15))
27. Jasmundite (IMA1981-047) 9.AG.70
  (IUPAC: undecacalcium dioxy tetra(tetraoxysilicate) sulfide)
28. Jasonsmithite (IMA2019-121) 8.0 [no] [no]
29. Jasrouxite (lillianite: IMA2012-058) 2.0 [no]
  (Ag_{16}Pb_{4}(Sb_{25}As_{15})_{Σ40}S_{72})
30. Jaszczakite (buckhornite: IMA2016-077) 2.0 [no] [no]
  (IUPAC: [tribismuth trisulfide][gold disulfide])
31. Javorieite (IMA2016-020) 3.0 [no] [no]
  (IUPAC: potassium iron trichloride)
32. Jeanbandyite (stottite: IMA1980-043) 4.FC.15
33. Jeankempite (IMA2018-090) 8.CJ. [no] [no]
  (IUPAC: pentacalcium diarsenate di(hydroxoarsenate) heptahydrate)
34. Jedwabite (alloy: IMA1995-043) 1.AE.25
  (IUPAC: heptairon tritantalum alloy)
35. Jeffbenite (IMA2014-097) 9.0 [no] [no]
  (IUPAC: trimagnesium dialuminium dodecaoxy trisilicate)
36. Jeffreyite (melilite: IMA1982-075) 9.BB.10
37. Jennite (IMA1965-021) 9.DG.20
  (IUPAC: nonacalcium di(nonaoxy trisilicate) hexahydroxyl octahydrate)
38. Jensenite (tellurium oxysalt: IMA1994-043) 4.FL.60
  (IUPAC: tricopper(II) tellurium(VI) hexaoxide dihydrate)
39. Jentschite (IMA1993-025) 2.HD.40
  (IUPAC: palladium thallium diarsenic hexasulfa antimonide)
40. Jeppeite (IMA1980-080) 4.CC.50
41. Jeremejevite (Y: 1883) 6.AB.15
  (IUPAC: hexaaluminium pentaborate fluoride)
42. Jerrygibbsite (humite: IMA1981-059) 9.AF.70
  (IUPAC: nonamanganese(II) tetra(tetraoxysilicate) dihydroxyl)
43. Jervisite (pyroxene: IMA1980-012) 9.DA.25
  (IUPAC: sodium scandium(III) hexaoxy disilicate)
44. Ježekite (IMA2014-079) 5.0 [no] [no]
  (IUPAC: octasodium [uranyl tricarbonate] disulfate trihydrate)
45. Jianshuiite (IMA1990-019) 4.FL.20
  (IUPAC: magnesium trimanganese(IV) heptaoxide trihydrate)
46. Jimboite (IMA1963-002) 6.AA.35
  (IUPAC: trimanganese(II) diborate)
47. Jimthompsonite (IMA1977-011) 9.DF.05
  (IUPAC: pentamagnesium hexadecaoxy hexasilicate dihydroxyl)
48. Jingsuiite (IMA2018-117b) 6.0 [no] [no]
  (IUPAC: titanium diboride)
49. Jingwenite-(Y) (IMA2021-070) [no] [no]
50. Jinshajiangite (seidozerite, bafertisite: IMA1981-061) 9.BE.67
51. Joanneumite (IMA2012-001) 10.0 [no] [no]
  (IUPAC: bis(isocyanurato)diamminecopper(II))
52. Joaquinite-(Ce) (joaquinite: IMA2001 s.p., 1932 Rd) 9.CE.25
53. Joegoldsteinite (spinel: IMA2015-049) 2.0 [no] [no]
  (IUPAC: manganese dichromium tetrasulfide)
54. Joëlbruggerite (dugganite: IMA2008-034) 8.B0.20 [no]
55. Joesmithite [Ca-amphibole: IMA2012 s.p., 1968] 9.DE.10
56. Johachidolite (IMA1977 s.p., 1942 Rd) 6.CC.05
  (IUPAC: calcium aluminium heptaoxo triborate)
57. Johanngeorgenstadtite (alluaudite: IMA2019-122) 8.0 [no] [no]
  (Ni^{2+}_{4.5}(AsO_{4})_{3})
58. Johannite (johannite: 1830) 7.EB.05
  (IUPAC: copper diuranyl dihydro disulfate octahydrate)
59. Johannsenite (pyroxene: IMA1988 s.p., 1938) 9.DA.15
  (IUPAC: calcium manganese hexaoxy disilicate)
60. Johillerite (alluaudite: IMA1980-014) 8.AC.10
  (IUPAC: sodium copper trimagnesium triarsenate)
61. Johnbaumite (apatite: IMA1980-B) 8.BN.05
  (IUPAC: pentacalcium hydro triarsenate)
62. Johninnesite (IMA1985-046) 9.DH.70
63. Johnkoivulaite (beryl: IMA2019-046) 9.C [no] [no]
64. Johnsenite-(Ce) (eudialyte: IMA2004-026) 9.CO.10
65. Johnsomervilleite (fillowite: IMA1979-032) 8.AC.50
66. Johntomaite (bjarebyite: IMA1999-009) 8.BH.20
  (IUPAC: barium diiron(II) diiron(III) trihydro triphosphate)
67. Johnwalkite (IMA1985-008) 8.DJ.05
68. Jôkokuite (chalcanthite: IMA1976-045) 7.CB.20
  (IUPAC: manganese(II) sulfate pentahydrate)
69. Joliotite (IMA1974-014) 5.EB.15
  (IUPAC: uranyl carbonate dihydrate)
70. Jolliffeite (ullmannite: IMA1989-011) 2.EB.25
  (IUPAC: nickel arsenide selenide)
71. Jonassonite (IMA2004-031) 2.LA.65 [no]
  (Au(Bi,Pb)_{5}S_{4})
72. Jonesite (IMA1976-040) 9.DJ.30
73. Joosteite (wagnerite: IMA2005-013) 8.BB.15 [no]
  (IUPAC: manganese(II) manganese(III) oxophosphate)
74. Jordanite (geocronite: 1864) 2.JB.30a
  (Pb_{14}(As,Sb)_{6}S_{23})
75. Jordisite (amorphous: 1909) 2.EA.30
  (IUPAC: molybdenum disulfide)
76. Jørgensenite (jarlite: IMA1995-046) 3.CC.20
77. Jörgkellerite (IMA2015-020) 8.0 [no] [no]
78. Joséite-A^{Q} (tetradymite: 1944) 2.D?.
  (IUPAC: tetrabismuth telluride disulfide)
  Note: possibly the questionable and not approved joséite.
79. Joséite-B^{Q} (tetradymite: 1949) 2.DC.05
  (IUPAC: tetrabismuth ditelluride sulfide)
  Note: possibly a sulfur-rich variety of pilsenite.
80. Joteite (IMA2012-091) 8.0 [no] [no]
  (IUPAC: calcium copper aluminium dihydro arsenate dioxo(hydroarsenate) pentahydrate)
81. Jouravskite (ettringite: IMA1965-009) 7.DG.15
  (IUPAC: tricalcium manganese(IV) hexahydro sulfate carbonate dodecahydrate)
82. Juabite (tellurite-arsenate: IMA1996-001) 4.JN.30
  (IUPAC: calcium decacopper dihydro tetratellurite tetrarsenate tetrahydrate)
83. Juangodoyite (IMA2004-036) 5.AB.60
  (IUPAC: disodium copper dicarbonate)
84. Juanitaite (IMA1999-022) 8.DE.40
85. Juanite^{Q} (Y: 1932) 9.HA.70
86. Juansilvaite (IMA2015-080) 8.0 [no] [no]
  (IUPAC: pentasodium trialuminium tetraoxohydroarsenate dioxodihydroarsenate disulfate hydrate)
87. Julgoldite (pumpellyite) 9.BG.20
  1. Julgoldite-(Fe^{2+}) (IMA1966-033) 9.BG.20
  2. Julgoldite-(Fe^{3+}) (IMA1973 s.p., IMA1972-003) 9.BG.20 [no]
  3. Julgoldite-(Mg) (IMA1973 s.p., IMA1972-003a) 9.BG.20 [no] [no]
88. Julienite (IMA2007 s.p., 1928) 10.AD.05
  (IUPAC: disodium tetrathiocyanatocobaltate(II) octahydrate)
89. Jungite (IMA1977-034) 8.DJ.25
  (IUPAC: dicalcium tetrazinc octairon(III) nonahydro nonaphosphate hexadecahydrate)
90. Junitoite (IMA1975-042) 9.BD.15
  (IUPAC: calcium dizinc heptaoxy disilicate monohydrate)
91. Junoite (IMA1974-011) 2.JB.25a
  (Cu_{2}Pb_{3}Bi_{8}(S,Se)_{16})
92. Juonniite (overite: IMA1996-060) 8.DH.20
  (IUPAC: calcium magnesium scandium hydro diphosphate tetrahydrate)
93. Jurbanite (IMA1974-023) 7.DB.15
  (IUPAC: aluminium hydro sulfate pentahydrate)
94. Jusite^{Q} (Y: 1943) 9.D?. [no] [no]
  Note: probably tobermorite.
