= Abenakiite-(Ce) =

Cyclosilicate mineral

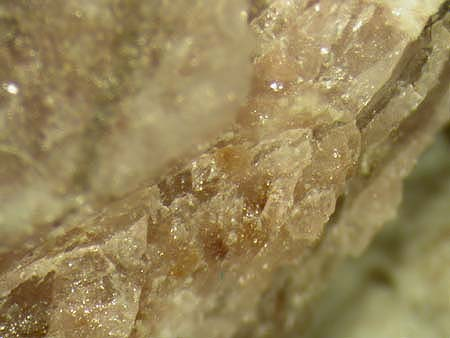

General
- Category: Cyclosilicate minerals
- Formula: Na_{26}Ce_{6}(SiO_{3})_{6}(PO_{4})_{6}(CO_{3})_{6}(S^{4+}O_{2})O
- IMA symbol: Abk-Ce
- Strunz classification: 9.CK.10
- Crystal system: Trigonal
- Crystal class: Rhombohedral (3̅); H-M symbol: (3̅)
- Space group: R3̅
- Unit cell: a = 16.02, c = 19.76 [Å], Z = 3

Identification
- Colour: Pale brown, to dark brown
- Crystal habit: Euhedral Crystals - Occurs as well-formed crystals showing good external form.
- Cleavage: {0001}, poor
- Fracture: Conchoidal
- Mohs scale hardness: 4–5
- Luster: Vitreous
- Streak: White
- Diaphaneity: Transparent
- Specific gravity: 3.32 gm/cc.
- Density: 3.21
- Optical properties: Uniaxial (−)
- Refractive index: nω=1.59, nε=1.57
- Other characteristics: Radioactive

Abenakiite-(Ce) is a cyclosilicate mineral named after the Abenaki, an Algonquian Indian tribe of New England. It consists of sodium, cerium, neodymium, lanthanum, praseodymium, thorium, samarium, oxygen, sulfur, carbon, phosphorus, and silicon with a chemical formula Na_{26}Ce_{6}(SiO_{3})_{6}(PO_{4})_{6}(CO_{3})_{6}(S^{4+}O_{2})O. The silicate groups may be given as the cyclic Si_{6}O_{18} grouping. Abenakiite-(Ce) has a Mohs scale rating is 4 to 5.

== Occurrence and association ==
Abenakiite-(Ce) was discovered in a sodalite syenite xenolith at Mont Saint-Hilaire, Québec, Canada, together with aegirine, eudialyte, manganoneptunite, polylithionite, serandite, and steenstrupine-(Ce).

== Chemistry and relation to other species ==
The combination of elements in abenakiite-(Ce) is unique. A somewhat chemically similar mineral is steenstrupine-(Ce). The hyper-sodium abenakiite-(Ce) is also unique in supposed presence of sulfur dioxide ligand. With a single grain originally found, abenakiite-(Ce) is extremely rare.

== Crystal structure ==
In the crystal structure, described as a hexagonal net, of abenakiite-(Ce) there are:

- chains of NaO_{7} polyhedra, connected with PO_{4} groups
- columns with six-membered rings of NaO_{7}, and NaO_{7}-REEO_{6}, and SiO_{4} polyhedra (REE – rare earth elements)
- CO_{3} groups, NaO_{6} octahedra, and disordered SO_{2} ligands within the columns

== See also ==
- List of minerals
