= Joaquinite-(Ce) =

Rare mineral

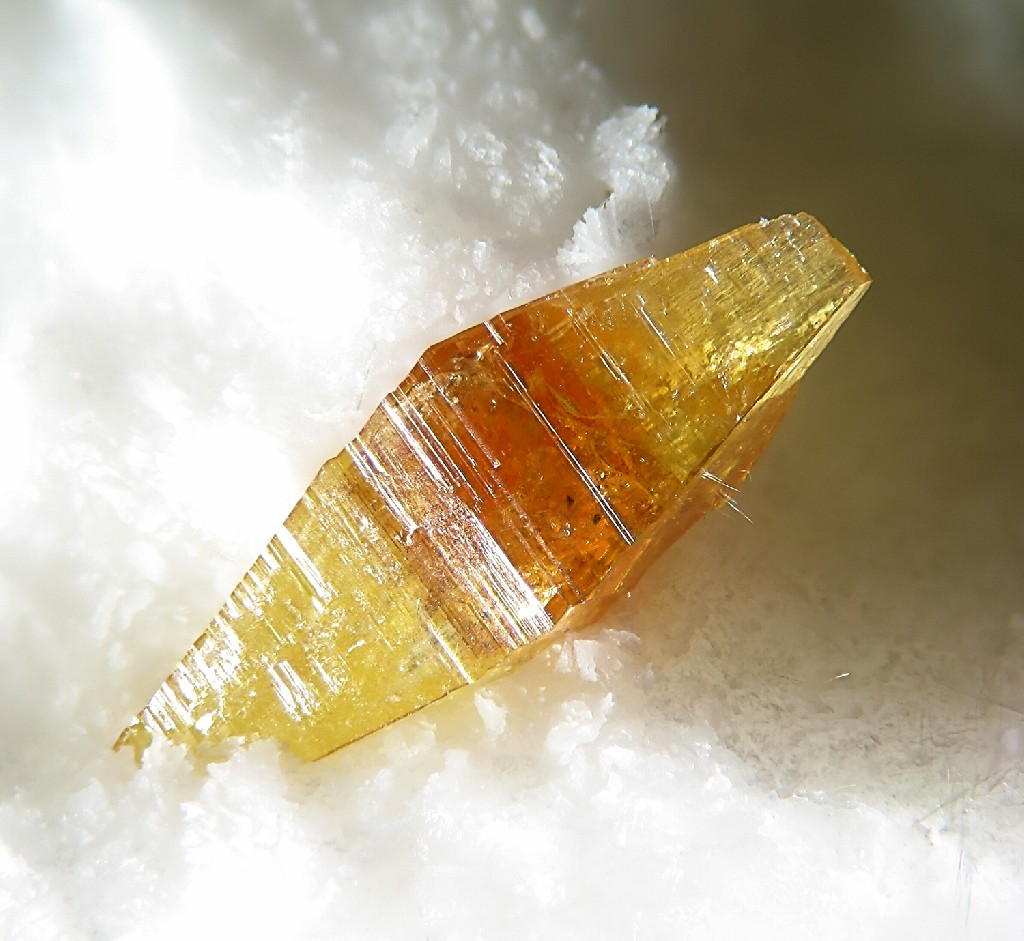

General
- Category: Silicate
- Formula: NaBa_{2}Ce_{2}Fe^{2+}Ti_{2}Si_{8}O_{26}(OH)·2H_{2}O
- Strunz classification: 9.CJ.05
- Space group: P2_{1}/m
- Unit cell: a = , b = , c = , β = °; Z=2

Identification
- Color: Dark grey
- Crystal habit: Tabular crystals
- Twinning: Polysynthetic on {001}
- Cleavage: Good on {001}
- Fracture: Uneven
- Tenacity: Brittle
- Mohs scale hardness: 5.5
- Luster: Vitreous
- Streak: White
- Diaphaneity: Translucent
- Optical properties: Biaxial (-)
- Pleochroism: Strong red-brown
- Ultraviolet fluorescence: None
- Other characteristics: Internal reflections strong red-brown

Joaquinite-(Ce) is a rare silicate mineral with the chemical formula NaBa_{2}Ce_{2}Fe^{2+}Ti_{2}Si_{8}O_{26}(OH)·2H_{2}O. It crystallizes in the monoclinic system with orthorhombic pseudomorphism and exhibits tabular crystals.

== Crystallography ==
Joaquinite-(Ce) belongs to the monoclinic crystal system with orthorhombic pseudomorphism. It forms in point group 2. Twinning is polysynthetic on {001}, and the mineral shows good cleavage on {001} with uneven fracture. The average hardness is 5.5 on the Mohs scale.

== Optical properties ==
The mineral is translucent, with a vitreous lustre and white streak. It is biaxial and displays strong red-brown pleochroism. Internally, it shows strong red-brown reflections under crossed polars.

== Environment ==
Joaquinite typically occurs in natrolite veins cutting a glaucophane schist, as inclusions in a serpentinite body, and in fennitized gneisses and alkalic syenites.

== Associated minerals ==
It is commonly found in association with aegirine, barylite, benitoite, eudialyte, natrolite, neptunite, and orthojoaquinite-(Ce).

Minerals with optical similarities include verplanckite, baotite, cerchiaraite, titantaramellite, taramellite, nagashimalite, strontiojoaquinite, strontio-orthojoaquinite, bario-orthojoaquinite, and orthojoaquinite-(La–Ce).

== Type locality ==
The type locality for joaquinite is the Dallas Gem Mine in the Benitoite Mine in California, USA.

== See also ==
- Joaquinite group
