= Joaquinite group =

Mineral group

The joaquinite group minerals are titanosilicates with the general formula R_{6}[Ti(Si_{4}O_{12})]_{2}(O,OH,F)_{2}·H_{2}O, where R represents a combination of rare-earth elements, barium, and other large cations.

== Discovery and characterization ==
Joaquinite was first described by George D. Louderback in 1909 from the Benitoite Gem Mine in San Benito County, California. Early studies by Palache and Foshag (1932) proposed orthorhombic symmetry and a preliminary formula, but detailed characterization remained incomplete for decades. Renewed interest followed discoveries in Quebec and Greenland, where rare-earth elements were confirmed as essential components. Laird and Albee (1972) demonstrated that joaquinite is monoclinic with polysynthetic twinning, and later structural refinements by Cannillo et al. (1972) and Dowty (1975) clarified its crystallography. Compositional variations led to the definition of the joaquinite group, including new strontium- and barium-dominant species approved by the International Mineralogical Association.

== List of joaquinite-group minerals ==
- Bario-orthojoaquinite
- Byelorussite-(Ce)
- Joaquinite-(Ce)
- Orthojoaquinite-(Ce)
- Orthojoaquinite-(La)
- Strontiojoaquinite
- Strontio-orthojoaquinite
