= Benitoite =

Barium titanium cyclosilicate mineral

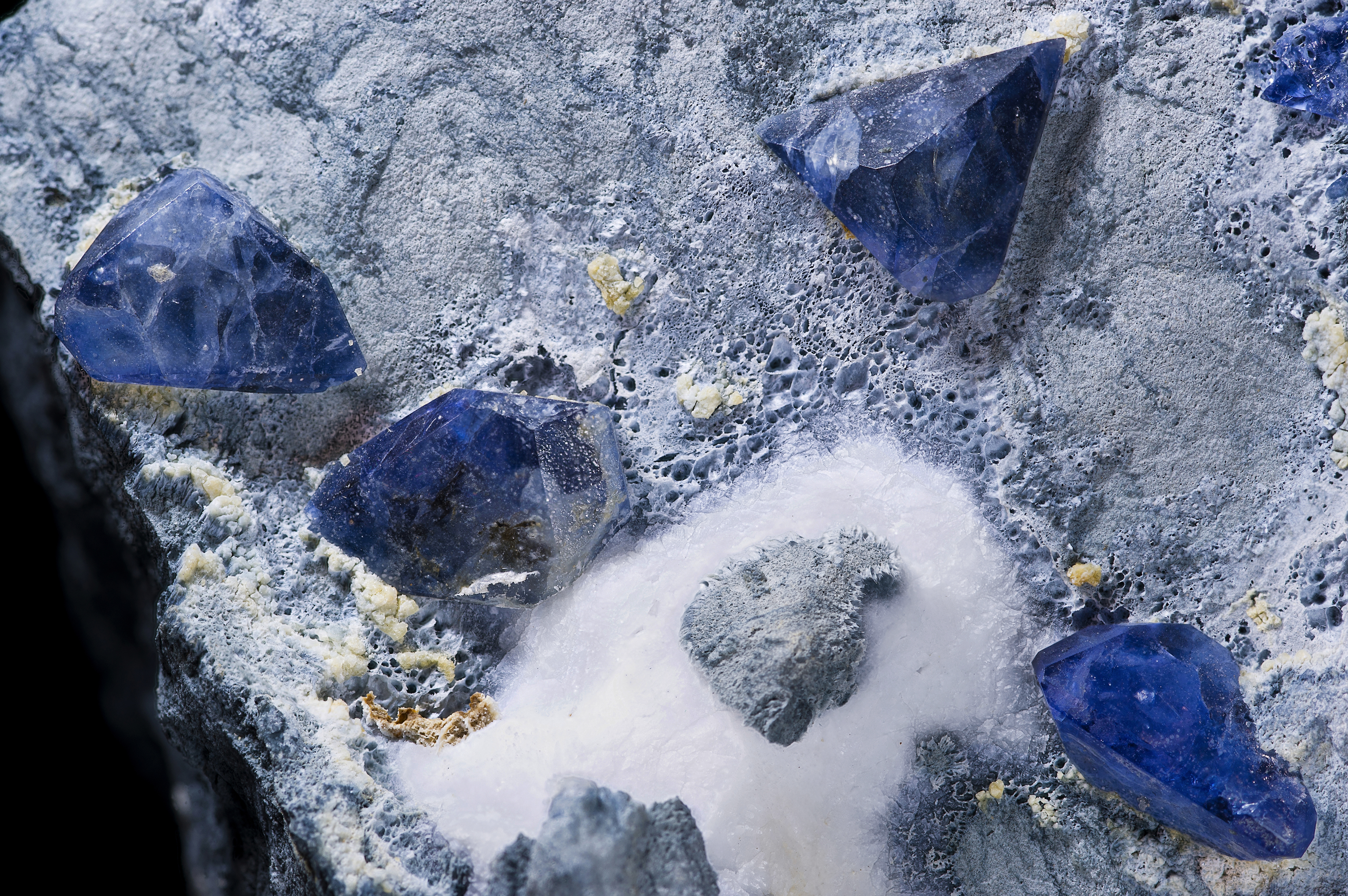
- Benitoite on natrolite

General
- Category: Cyclosilicate
- Formula: BaTiSi_{3}O_{9}
- IMA symbol: Bni
- Strunz classification: 9.CA.05
- Crystal system: Hexagonal
- Crystal class: Ditrigonal dipyramidal (6̅m2); H-M symbol: (6̅ m2)
- Space group: P6̅c2
- Unit cell: a = 6.641, c = 9.7597(10) [Å]; Z = 2

Identification
- Color: Blue, colorless
- Crystal habit: Tabular dipyramidal crystals, granular
- Twinning: On {0001} by rotation
- Cleavage: [101̅1] poor
- Fracture: Conchoidal
- Mohs scale hardness: 6–6.5
- Luster: Vitreous
- Streak: White
- Diaphaneity: Transparent to translucent
- Specific gravity: 3.65
- Optical properties: Uniaxial (+)
- Refractive index: n_{ω} = 1.756 – 1.757 n_{ε} = 1.802 – 1.804
- Birefringence: δ = 0.046
- Pleochroism: O = colorless; E = purple, indigo, greenish blue
- Dispersion: 0.036–0.046
- Solubility: Insoluble: HCl, H_{2}SO_{4} Soluble: HF
- Other characteristics: Blue fluorescence under SW UV; intense blue cathodoluminescence

Benitoite (/bəˈniːtoʊaɪt/) is a rare, blue, barium titanium cyclosilicate mineral, found in hydrothermally altered serpentinite. It forms in low-temperature, high-pressure environments typical of subduction zones at convergent plate boundaries. Benitoite fluoresces under short-wave ultraviolet light, appearing bright blue to bluish white in color. The more rarely seen clear to white benitoite crystals fluoresce red under long-wave UV light.

It was discovered in 1907 by prospector James M. Couch in the San Benito Mountains, located in central California, southeast of San Jose. Due to its similar color, Couch originally believed it to be sapphire, a variety of corundum. In 1909, a sample was sent to the University of California, Berkeley, where mineralogist Dr. George D. Louderback realized it was a previously unknown mineral. Corundum (sapphire) has a defined Mohs hardness of 9, while benitoite is much softer. He named it "benitoite" for its occurrence near the headwaters of the San Benito River in San Benito County, California.

Benitoite occurs in a number of isolated locations globally, but gemstone-quality material has only been found in California at the Benito Gem Mine, where it was first discovered. It has been correctly identified in Montana, Arkansas, Japan, and Australia, although they formed under slightly different conditions and only grow large enough to be considered an accessory mineral. In 1985, benitoite was named as the official state gem of California.

Benitoite typically crystallizes hexagonally. Nongem crystals of benitoite can have a very rare, six-pointed, twinned form.

== Associated minerals and locations ==
Benitoite typically occurs with an unusual set of minerals, along with minerals that make up its host rock. Frequently associated minerals include natrolite, neptunite, joaquinite, serpentine, and albite.

Benitoite is a rare mineral found in very few locations including San Benito County, California, Japan, and Arkansas. In the San Benito occurrence, it is found in natrolite veins within glaucophane schist within a serpentinite body. In Japan, the mineral occurs in a magnesio-riebeckite-quartz-phlogopite-albite dike cutting a serpentinite body.

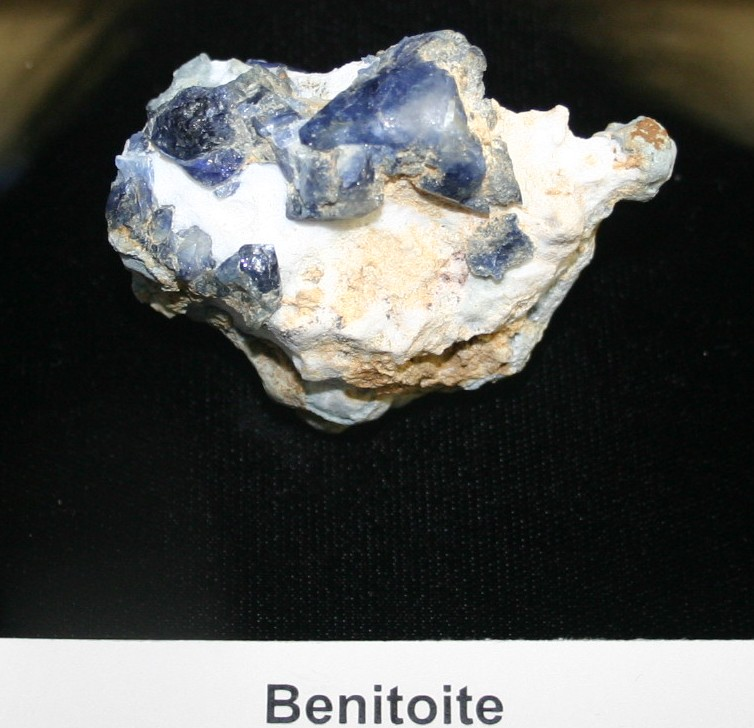
Blue benitoite crystals on white natrolite, Dallas Gem Mine, San Benito Co., California, US

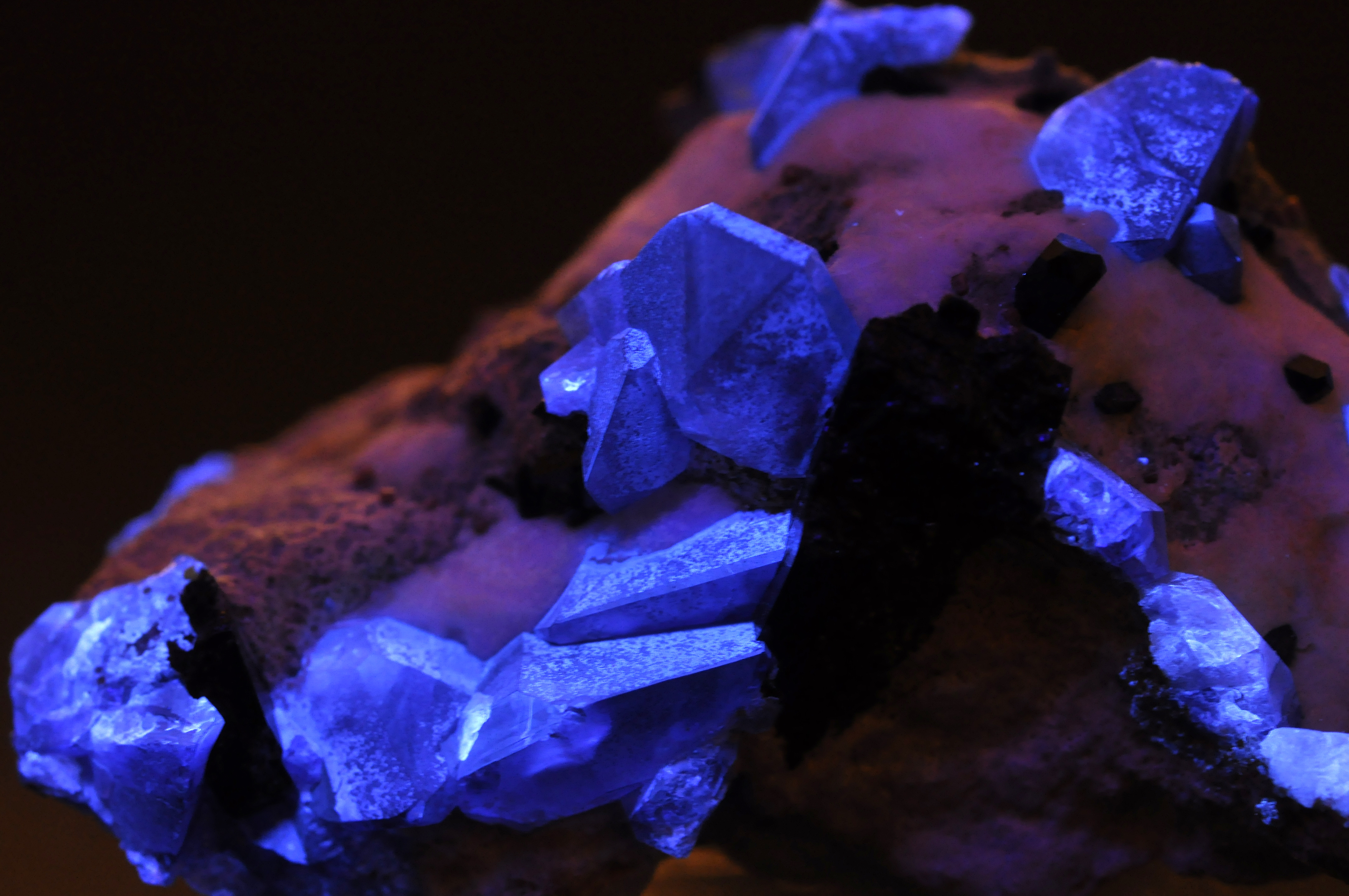
Benitoite crystals under UV light
