= Pressure-induced hydration =

Pressure-induced hydration (PIH), also known as “super-hydration”, is a special case of pressure-induced insertion whereby water molecules are injected into the pores of microporous materials. In PIH, a microporous material is placed under pressure in the presence of water in the pressure-transmitting fluid of a diamond anvil cell.

Early physical characterization and initial diffraction experiments in zeolites were followed by the first unequivocal structural characterization of PIH in the small-pore zeolite natrolite (Na_{16}Al_{16}Si_{24}O_{80}·16H_{2}O), which in its fully super-hydrated form, Na_{16}Al_{16}Si_{24}O_{80}·32H_{2}O, doubles the amount of water it contains in its pores.

PIH has now been demonstrated in natrolites containing Li, K, Rb and Ag as monovalent cations as well as in large-pore zeolites, pyrochlores, clays and graphite oxide.

Using the noble gases Ar, Kr, and Xe as well as CO_{2} as pressure-transmitting fluids, researchers have prepared and structurally characterized the products of reversible, pressure-induced insertion of Ar Kr, and CO_{2} as well as the irreversible insertion of Xe and water.
