= Gonnardite =

Zeolite mineral

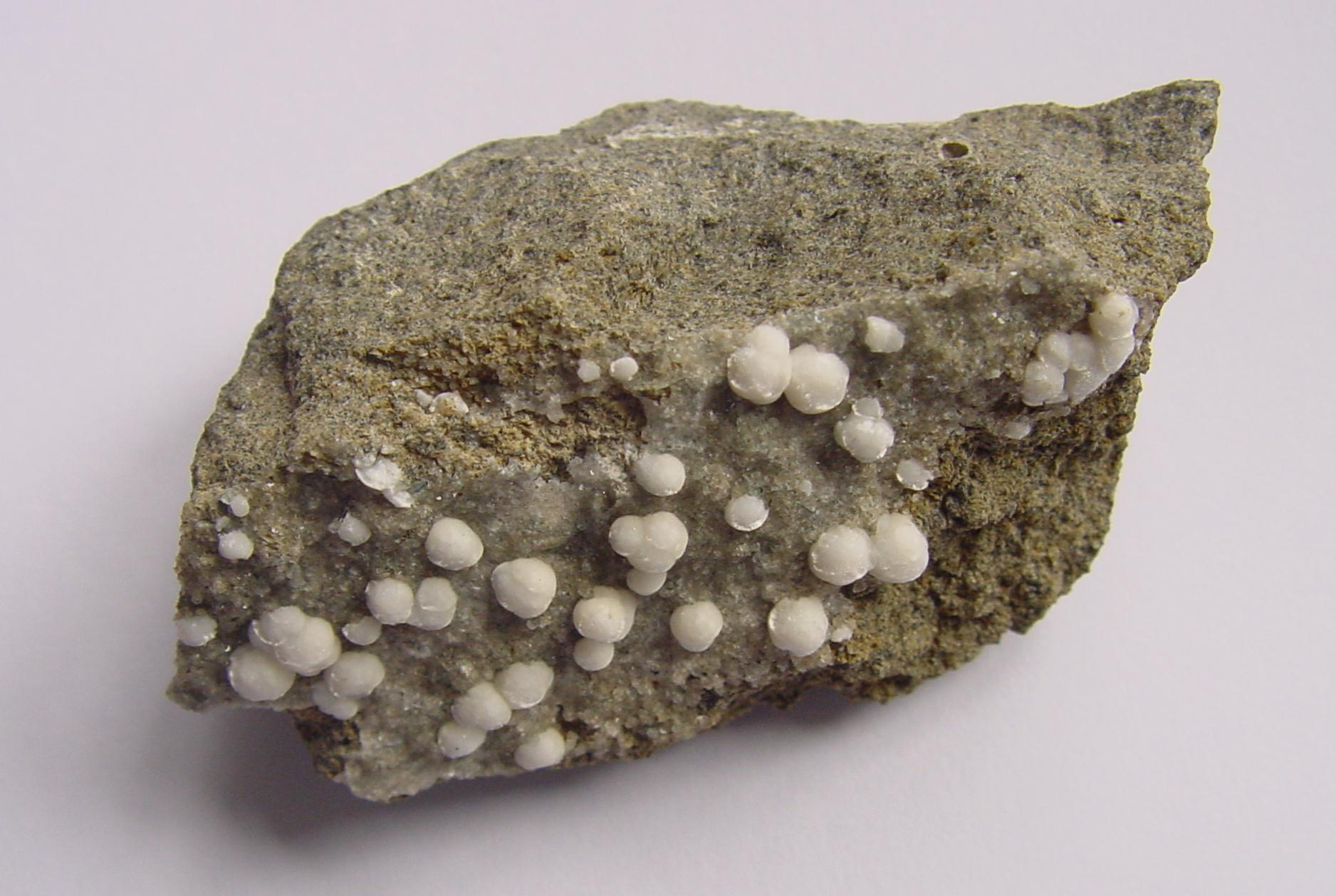
- Gonnardite from the Bundoora Quarry, Victoria, Australia. Specimen size 4.9 cm

General
- Category: Tectosilicate minerals
- Group: Zeolite group, natrolite subgroup
- Formula: (Na,Ca)_{2}(Si,Al)_{5}O_{10}·3H_{2}O
- IMA symbol: Gon
- Strunz classification: 9.GA.05 (10 ed); 8/J.21-40 (8 ed)
- Dana classification: 77.1.5.7
- Crystal system: Tetragonal
- Crystal class: Scalenohedral (4̅2m); H-M symbol: (4̅ 2m)
- Space group: I4̅2d
- Unit cell: a = 13.38 c = 6.66 [Å]; Z = 2

Identification
- Color: Colorless, white, yellow or pink to salmon orange
- Crystal habit: Radiating fibrous; massive
- Mohs scale hardness: 4 to 5
- Luster: Vitreous to silky or dull
- Streak: White
- Diaphaneity: Translucent
- Specific gravity: 2.21 to 2.36
- Optical properties: Biaxial (+)
- Refractive index: n_{α} = 1.514, n_{β} = 1.515, n_{γ} = 1.520
- Birefringence: δ = 0.006
- 2V angle: Measured, 52°

Gonnardite is a comparatively rare, fibrous zeolite, natrolite subgroup. Older papers claim that a complete solid solution exists between tetranatrolite and gonnardite, but tetranatrolite was discredited as a separate species in 1999. A series, based on the disorder of the silicon-aluminum in the framework, appears to exist between Na-rich gonnardite and natrolite, Na_{2}(Si_{3}Al_{2})O_{10}·2H_{2}O.

Gonnardite was named in 1896 after Ferdinand Pierre Joseph Gonnard (1833–1923), who was Professor of Mining Engineering at the University of Lyon, France.

== Crystallography ==
Orthorhombic-bipyramidal class 2/m 2/m 2/m and tetragonal-scalenoidal class 4̅2m (orthorhombic with a very close to b, or tetragonal with a equal to b).
Unit Cell Parameters: a = b = 13.21 Å, c = 6.622 Å, Z = 2
Space Group: I4̅2d

== Crystal habit ==
Crystals are prismatic, bounded by {110} and {111} as well as {100} and {001}, and gonnardite also occurs as radial hemispheres. Commonly found as zoned prisms or aggregates with thomsonite, natrolite and paranatrolite.

== Structure ==
Gonnardite is a tectosilicate belonging to the natrolite group. The natrolite minerals are composed of chains of AlO_{4} and SiO_{4} tetrahedra that link to form frameworks. As with all zeolites, there are channels within the framework, and for the natrolite minerals the channels are occupied by polyhedra containing sodium, calcium or barium, together with oxygen and water. Gonnardite has the same framework structure as natrolite, but a disordered Si, Al distribution on the tetrahedral sites. Some of the water sites in the disordered natrolite structure of gonnardite are empty.

== Environment ==
Gonnardite has been found in silica-poor volcanics and pegmatites. It occurs with thomsonite and natrolite in vesicles in the volcanic rock of The Nut, near Stanley, Tasmania, Australia, intergrown with natrolite at Don Hill, Tasmania and in drill holes with chabazite and calcite near Guildford, Tasmania. It is also found in nepheline-syenite in the Grenville Geological Province, which is part of the Canadian Shield. The type locality (the place where the mineral was first described) is La Chaux de Bergonne, Gignat, Saint-Germain-Lembron, Puy-de-Dôme, Auvergne, France, and type material from this locality is held at the Natural History Museum, London, England, registration number BM.1930,166.
