= Juansilvaite =

Arsenate-sulfate mineral

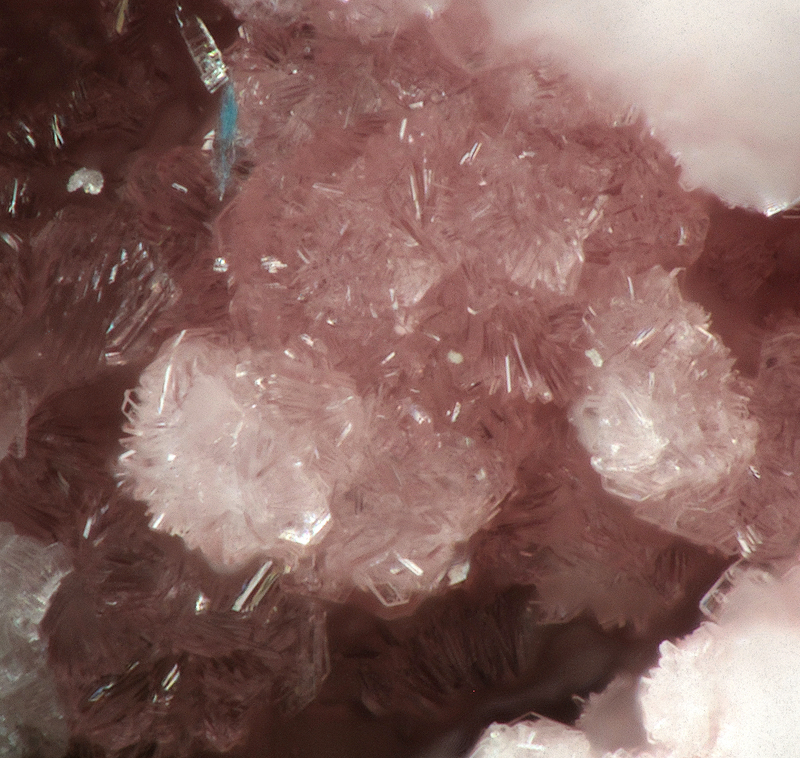
- Juansilvaite found in Chile

General
- Category: Arsenate, Sulfate
- Formula: Na_{5}Al_{3}[AsO_{3}(OH)]_{4}[AsO_{2}(OH)_{2}]_{2}(SO_{4})_{2}·4H_{2}O
- IMA symbol: Jsl
- Crystal system: Monoclinic
- Crystal class: Prismatic (2/m) (same H-M symbol)
- Space group: C2/c
- Unit cell: a = 18.18, b = 8.63 c = 18.51 [Å], β = 90.39° (approximated)

Identification

Juansilvaite is a very rare, complex arsenate-sulfate mineral with formula Na_{5}Al_{3}[AsO_{3}(OH)]_{4}[AsO_{2}(OH)_{2}]_{2}(SO_{4})_{2}·4H_{2}O. It is both hydroxyarsenate and dihydroxyarsenate. It is among few relatively new minerals from the Torrecillas mine in Chile, the other being torrecillasite, canutite, chongite, gajardoite, leverettite, and magnesiokoritnigite. Although having quite common among minerals space group C2/c, juansilvaite has a new type of structure.
