= Jalpaite =

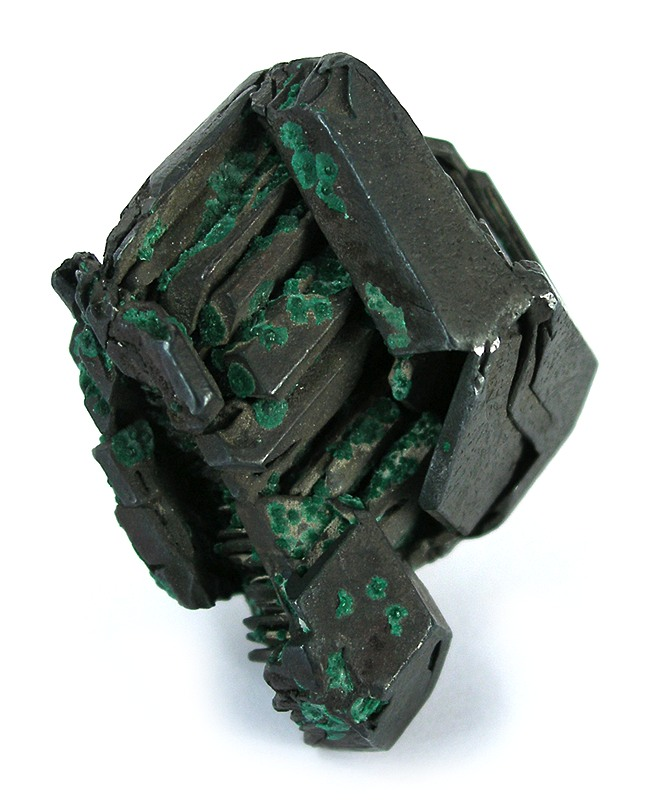
- Jalpaite crystals from Jalpa, Municipio de Jalpa, Zacatecas, Mexico (size: 3.6 x 3.5 x 3.2 cm)

General
- Category: Sulfide mineral
- Formula: Ag_{3}CuS_{2}
- IMA symbol: Jal
- Strunz classification: 2.BA.45
- Crystal system: Tetragonal
- Crystal class: Ditetragonal dipyramidal (4/mmm); H-M symbol: (4/m 2/m 2/m)
- Space group: I4_{1}/amd
- Unit cell: a = 8.67, c = 11.75 [Å]; Z = 8

Identification
- Color: Pale metallic gray
- Crystal habit: Irregular and foliated masses, inclusions in other minerals
- Cleavage: Prismatic, good
- Fracture: Subconchoidal
- Tenacity: Sectile, malleable
- Mohs scale hardness: 2 - 2.5
- Luster: Metallic
- Streak: Black
- Diaphaneity: Opaque
- Specific gravity: 6.82–6.85
- Pleochroism: Distinct in oil, brownish gray to pure gray
- Alters to: Tarnishes with iridescence

Jalpaite is a rare copper silver sulfide mineral with formula Ag_{3}CuS_{2}.

It was first described in 1858 for an occurrence in the Leonora Mine, Jalpa, Zacatecas, Mexico and named after the locality. It occurs in low temperature hydrothermal veins at temperatures less than 117 °C (243 °F). Associated minerals include acanthite, mckinstryite, galena, sphalerite, pyrite, chalcopyrite, stromeyerite, polybasite, pearceite, tetrahedrite–tennantite and native silver.
