= Nabalamprophyllite =

General
- Category: Sorosilicate
- Formula: Ba(Na,Ba){Na_{3}Ti[Ti_{2}O_{2}Si_{4}O_{14}](OH,F)_{2}}
- IMA symbol: Nlmp
- Crystal system: Monoclinic
- Crystal class: Prismatic (2/m) (same H-M symbol)
- Space group: P2/m
- Unit cell: a = 19.805, b = 7.123 c = 5.426 [Å]; β = 96.45; Z = 2 ; V = 753.4 Å^{3}

Identification
- Color: Brown to bright yellow crystals
- Crystal habit: Prismatic, sheaf-like, random aggregates
- Cleavage: Perfect (001)
- Mohs scale hardness: 3
- Luster: Glassy
- Streak: White
- Diaphaneity: Transparent to translucent
- Optical properties: Biaxial positive
- Refractive index: n_{α}=1.750, n_{γ}=1.799
- Pleochroism: Weak, green-brown
- 2V angle: 40.5°

Nabalamprophyllite has a general formula of Ba(Na,Ba){Na_{3}Ti[Ti_{2}O_{2}Si_{4}O_{14}](OH,F)_{2}}. The name is given for its composition (Naba, meaning sodium, Na and barium, Ba) and relation to other lamprophyllite-group minerals. Lamprophyllite is a rare Ti-bearing silicate mineral usually found in intrusive igneous rocks.

Nabalamprophyllite is monoclinic, which means crystallographically, it contains three axes of unequal length and the angles between two of the axes are 90°, and one is less than 90°. It belongs to the space group P2/m. The mineral also has an orthorhombic polytype (nabalamprophyllite-2O). This mineral belongs to the space group Pnmn. In terms of its optical properties, nabalamprophyllite is anisotropic which means the velocity of light varies depending on direction through the mineral. Its calculated relief is 1.86 - 1.87. Its color in plane polarized light is green-brown, and it is weakly pleochroic.

The mineral has only been found in Russia, usually in association with coarse-grained igneous rocks called pegmatites. The type localities are the Inagli alkaline–ultrabasic massif, Yakutia and the Kovdor alkaline–ultrabasic massif in the Kola Peninsula.
