= Northstarite =

Lead-tellurite-thiosulfate mineral

General
- Category: Thiosulfate
- Formula: Pb_{6}(Te^{4+} O_{3})_{5}(S^{6+}O_{3}S^{2-})
- IMA symbol: Nsr
- Strunz classification: 7.JA.20
- Crystal system: Hexagonal
- Crystal class: Pyramidal
- Space group: P6_{3}
- Unit cell: a = 10.2573 Å, c = 11.678 Å V = 1064.0 Å^{3} Z = 2

Identification
- Color: Beige
- Crystal habit: Short prisms with pyramidal terminations
- Twinning: None
- Cleavage: None
- Fracture: Irregular
- Tenacity: Brittle
- Mohs scale hardness: 2
- Luster: Adamantine
- Streak: White
- Diaphaneity: Transparent
- Specific gravity: 6.888
- Density: 6.888 g/cm^{3}
- Optical properties: Uniaxial
- Refractive index: n_{α}= 1.686 n_{β}= 1.694 n_{γ}= 1.709
- Birefringence: δ
- Pleochroism: Non-pleochroic

Northstarite is an immensely rare lead-tellurite-thiosulfate mineral with an ideal formula of Pb_{6}(Te^{4+} O_{3})_{5}(S^{6+}O_{3}S^{2-}). Northstarite was first discovered in 2019 by Charles Adan in the North Star Mine of the Tintic Mining District, Juab County, Utah, USA. Northstarite received its name after this type locality where it was originally discovered, the North Star Mine. Northstarite is the fourth thiosulfate mineral that exists on Earth, and although all thiosulfates have essential lead components, northstarite is the first thiosulfate species containing groups of both thiosulfate and tellurite (Te^{4+}O_{3}).

== Occurrence ==
Northstarite is a mineral found in the oxidation zone of Earth, meaning that it is found near the Earth's surface and formed as a result of the chemical decomposition of other minerals that are unstable at the surface. Northstarite occurs in small rock cavities with quartz, baryte, enargite, and pyrite, but is also associated with anglesite, azurite, chrysocolla, fluorapatite, plumbogummite, tellurite, zincospiroffite, and a type of copper-tellurite that possesses poor crystallization. Northstarite is associated with another new mineral called adanite, which was also discovered in the North Star Mine and shares a similar chemical composition as northstarite. The holotype specimen of northstarite originated from the holotype specimen of adanite.

== Physical properties ==
The crystals of northstarite are about 1 mm in length and are short and prismatic, with pyramidal terminations. The irregular or uneven faces of the crystals avert accurate measurements, but rough measurements have been recorded as {100}, {101}, and {101} based on the general appearance of the crystals and the Donnay-Harker Law. The crystals display no twinning or cleavage, and have an uneven fracture. Northstarite is very brittle. Based on scratch tests, the hardness of northstarite is approximately 2 on the Mohs scale of hardness. Northstarite displays an adamantine luster and has transparent to translucent crystals with a beige color and a white streak.

== Optical properties ==
Northstarite is a nonpleochroic and uniaxial negative mineral. The calculated average index of refraction for northstarite is 2.15 based on the empirical formula of Pb_{5.80}Sb^{3+}_{0.05}Te^{4+}_{5.04}S^{6+}_{1.02}O_{18}.

== Chemical properties ==
Northstarite is a thiosulfate mineral that contains tellurite. The empirical formula of northstarite is Pb_{5.80}Sb^{3+}_{0.05}Te^{4+}_{5.04}S^{6+}_{1.02}O_{18}. When simplified, this formula becomes an ideal formula of Pb_{6}(Te^{4+} O_{3})_{5}(S^{6+}O_{3}S^{2-}). Chemically, northstarite resembles adanite, schieffelinite, and also eztlite to an extent. Northstarite is indicated to be an anhydrous mineral. When introduced to concentrated hydrochloric acid at room temperature, the crystals of northstarite are slowly soluble.

== Chemical composition ==
| Constituent | wt% | Range |
|---|---|---|
| PbO | 57.16 | 56.43-58.53 |
| Sb_{2}O_{3} | 0.32 | 0.21-0.43 |
| TeO_{2} | 35.46 | 35.03-35.89 |
| SO_{3}* | 7.22 | 7.06-7.38 |
| SO_{3}* | 3.61 | - |
| S* | 1.44 | - |
| O=S | -0.72 | - |
| Total | 97.27 | - |

_{* The measured SO_{3} in parentheses is allocated as SO_{3} and S based on S^{6+}:S^{2–} = 1:1}

== X-ray crystallography ==
Northstarite is in the hexagonal crystal system with a space group of P6_{3}. The unit cell dimensions are a= 10.253 Å and c= 11.6747 Å with a standard unit cell volume of 1061.50 Å^{3}.

Powder diffraction data:

| d-spacing | Intensity |
|---|---|
| 5.12 Å | (21) |
| 3.098 Å | (100) |
| 2.957 Å | (74) |
| 2.140 Å | (44) |
| 1.940 Å | (13) |
| 1.733 Å | (41) |
| 1.706 Å | (18) |
| 1.626 Å | (31) |

== See also ==
- List of minerals
