= Jalpa, Zacatecas =

- City and municipality

- Location within Zacatecas Location within Mexico
- Coordinates: 21°38′15″N 102°58′40″W
- Country: Mexico
- State: Zacatecas

Population (2020)
  - Total: 25,296

Jalpa is a town located in the Mexican state of Zacatecas, close to the border with Jalisco and Aguascalientes and about a two hours drive south of the capital city, Zacatecas. Jalpa is a colonial-style city, with cobble stone streets, narrow walkways, two main churches: El Señor de Jalpa and La Parroquia de San Antonio, and two plazas. Jalpa was modeled by the French in the 19th century. In the middle of the plaza is a kiosk which remains in good shape today, after hundreds of years. Most houses are painted in bright colors just as in colonial times. The houses are made of adobe and share common walls and most have flat roofs.

The original indigenous natives were the Caxcan, Chichimeca and Huichol people.

== History ==
=== Origin of the town of Jalpa ===
Jalpa was a Nahuatl chiefdom in the 11th century. It was founded in 1532 by Spanish explorers in search of gold and silver. Jalpa was spelled "Xalpa" by its native Caxcan, Chichimeca, and Huichol people. The first encomendero was Diego Hernández de Proaño in 1540, at the beginning of the Mixtón Rebellion, he was expelled from Jalpa by the Caxcanes Indians themselves who participated in this fight, under the command of their chief Petacatl, with more than 10,000 natives led by the Heroic Tenamaztle, they defended with their death the freedom denied by the Iberians from 1541 to 1542.

=== Independence era ===
In the first decade of the 19th century, the War of Independence began, echoing in this municipality, and the first Zacatecan Insurgents appeared, such as Daniel Camarena from Nochistlán, Father José María Calvillo from Colotlán, the Oropeza brothers and the Viramontes, the latter from the Hacienda la Bernarda in the municipality of Jalpa.

After the failure of Father Miguel Hidalgo y Costilla in the Battle of Calderón Bridge in the state of Jalisco, on his way north he followed the route of the Juchipila canyon, arriving in Jalpa on January 18, 1811, spending the night there. At this time Jalpa had a mining boom, since the mines of Leonera and Monroy were exploited, calling the municipality Jalpa Mineral.

=== Background to the second French intervention ===
At this time Jalpa had an intervention by the French Forces in the so-called French Intervention in 1864, "a command of French infantry forces of about 300 men led by Mexican traitors occupied the square of Jalpa, in the foreign invasion with a view to conquering our national territory and subjecting it to French rule." Conquered by the Spanish, the Indian population intermixed with Spanish and other European peoples to form today's mestizos.

== Population ==
The population is between ten and twelve thousand with most living within the town and surrounding communities. The population continues to grow since Jalpa is a significant transportation hub between the cities of Guadalajara, Aguascalientes, and Zacatecas. A large percentage of the population is older than 50 years; and there are significantly more females than males in the younger age bracket; the overall female to male ratio is about 50.9% to 49.1%. This disproportion is because more males migrate to the United States, whereas females usually stay. There are about 12,868 females and 12,428 males since 2020.

The Leonera Mine operated in Jalpa and was the first site where the mineral jalpaite, a rare copper-silver-sulfide mineral, was discovered in 1858.

Much of the growth in Jalpa is fed by remittances in US dollars from former residents who have emigrated to the United States. Almost every family has at least one member, usually male, residing in the US.

== Art and Culture ==
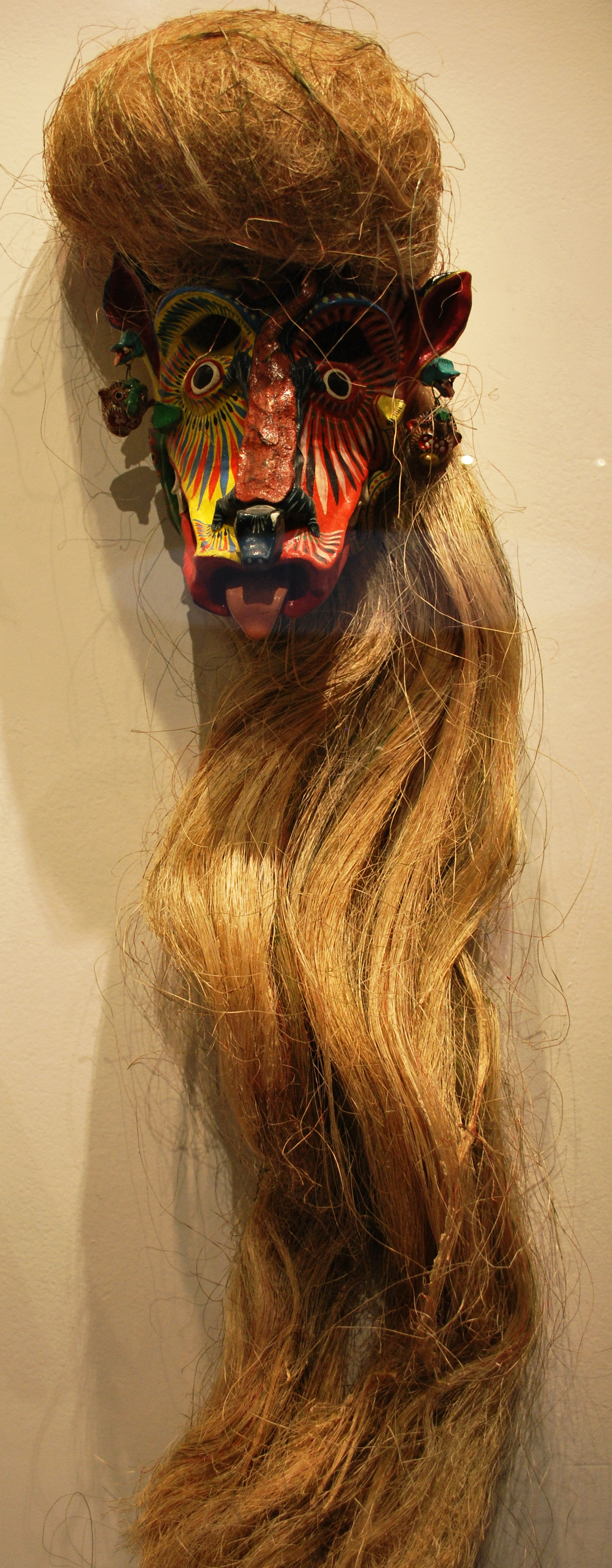
An image of a tastuan

Jalpa celebrates the "Tastuans Ritual" on July 25th, with participants dressing in cow-hair crests and wooden masks and donning bright capes. The festival includes theatrical battles, dancing, and religious ceremonies rooted in the Spanish conquest and local indigenous resistance.
