= Joegoldsteinite =

Rare sulfate mineral

General
- Category: Sulfide
- Formula: MnCr_{2}S_{4}
- IMA symbol: Jgs
- Crystal system: Isometric
- Crystal class: Hexoctahedral (m3̅m); H-M symbol: (4/m 3̅ 2/m)
- Space group: Fd3̅m
- Unit cell: a = 10.11 Å; Z = 8

Identification

Joegoldsteinite is a rare sulfide mineral with the formula MnCr_{2}S_{4}. It was discovered in Social Circle meteorite found in Georgia, US. The mineral is named after Joseph (Joe) I. Goldstein.

== Relation to other minerals ==
Joegoldsteinite is defined as manganese-analogue of daubréelite (iron-rich mineral). It is also analogous to kalininite (Zn-dominant) and cuprokalininite (Cu-dominant).
