= Baotite =

Rare mineral

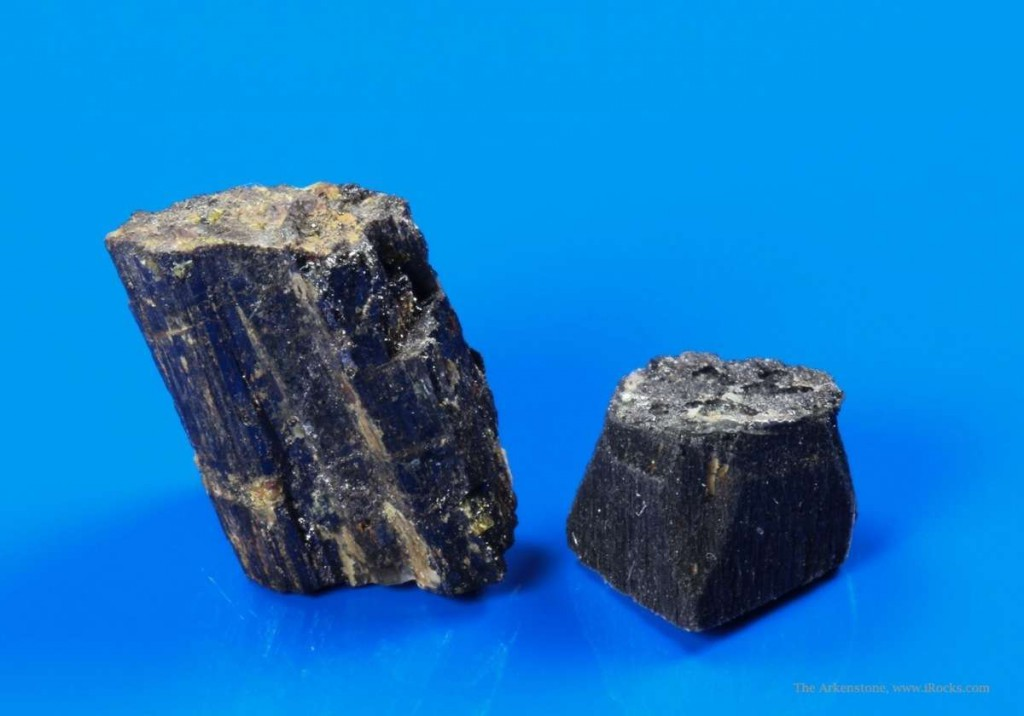
- Baotite from Sheep Creek, Mineral Point District, Ravalli County, Montana

General
- Category: Cyclosilicate
- Formula: Ba_{4}Ti_{4}(Ti,Nb,Fe)_{4}(Si_{4}O_{12})O_{16}Cl
- IMA symbol: Bao
- Strunz classification: 9.CE.15
- Crystal system: Tetragonal
- Crystal class: Dipyramidal (4/m); H-M symbol: (4/m)
- Space group: I4_{1}/a

Identification
- Color: light brown to black
- Crystal habit: anhedral to subhedral, prismatic and striated parallel to (001)
- Cleavage: fair on {110}
- Fracture: hackly
- Tenacity: brittle
- Mohs scale hardness: 6
- Luster: vitreous
- Density: 4.42-4.71 g/mL (measured), 4.69 g/mL (calculated)
- Optical properties: Uniaxial (+)
- Refractive index: n_{ω} = 1.94, n_{ε} > 2.00
- Pleochroism: strong
- Absorption spectra: E > O

Baotite is a rare mineral with the chemical formula Ba_{4}Ti_{4}(Ti, Nb, Fe)_{4}(Si_{4}O_{12})O_{16}Cl, recognized as having a unique four-fold silicate ring. Crystals are tetragonal, though commonly deformed to the extent of appearing monoclinic. Named for the locality of first discovery, Baotou, China, baotite has been found in hydrothermal veins and alkalic rocks in various locations around the world.

== Structure ==
Simonov first determined the crystal structure of baotite in which (Ti, Nb, Fe)-octahedra share edges, forming chains and cross-linking at the corners forming a 4-fold screw axis in the (001); these columns are analogous to those in rutile. Four silicate tetrahedra share corners creating characteristic rings in the plane perpendicular to the c axis. The barium cation is between the rings and rutile columns, while chloride fills the void between each pair of rings. Chlorine's presence is not necessary for the structure to balance electrostatically.

== Geologic occurrence ==
The first sample of baotite was found with galena, pyrite, albite, aegirine and alkali amphiboles in a quartz vein cutting quartzite at the Bayan Obo Mine in China. Grains from Ravalli County, Montana were found in a thin calcite crust on masses of eschynite within a carbonatic vein. Baotite also occurs at Haast River, New Zealand as an accessory phase of carbonatite, fenite and hydrothermal fluid veins associated with a dike swarm. The dike intrusion of mantle-derived magmas can likely be attributed to the close proximity of the Alpine fault plate boundary across South Island, New Zealand.
