= Nabesite =

Rare zeolite mineral

General
- Category: Tectosilicate minerals
- Group: Zeolite group
- Formula: Na_{2}BeSi_{4}O_{10}·4H_{2}O
- Strunz classification: 8/J.0-
- Dana classification: 77.1.5.11
- Crystal system: Orthorhombic
- Crystal class: Disphenoidal
- Space group: P2_{1}2_{1}2_{1} (No. 19)
- Unit cell: a=9.748Å, b=10.133Å, c=12.954Å

Identification
- Formula mass: 391.84
- Colour: Colourless, white
- Crystal habit: Platy, thin/flat
- Cleavage: Good
- Fracture: Brittle, uneven
- Mohs scale hardness: 5-6
- Luster: Vitreous
- Streak: White
- Diaphaneity: Transparent
- Specific gravity: 2.16
- Density: 2.16
- Birefringence: 0.012

Nabesite is a rare silicate mineral of the zeolite group with the chemical formula Na_{2}BeSi_{4}O_{10}·4(H_{2}O). It occurs as colorless to white orthorhombic crystals in thin platy mica like sheets. It has the zeolite structure. Its Mohs hardness is 5 to 6 and its specific gravity is 2.16. The reported refractive index values are n_{α}=1.499, n_{β}=1.507, and n_{γ}=1.511.

It was discovered in the Ilimaussaq intrusive complex, of southwest Greenland, and first recognized in 2000. It occurs in tugtupite-bearing albitite, a rare highly alkaline igneous rock.
