= Nelenite =

Phyllosilicate mineral

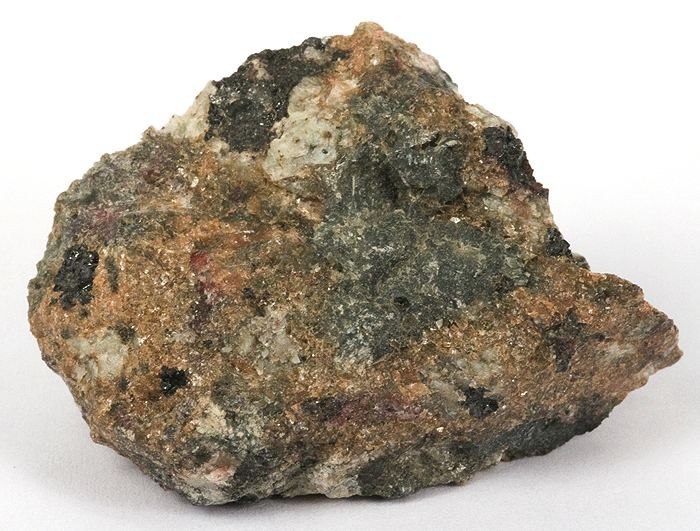
- Nelenite (brown) and franklinite (metallic, black), from Franklin, Franklin Mining District, Sussex County, New Jersey, US

General
- Category: Phyllosilicate minerals
- Formula: (Mn,Fe)_{16}As_{3}Si_{12}O_{36}(OH)_{17} or (Mn,Fe)_{16}(Si_{12}O_{30})(OH)_{14}[As^{3+}_{3}O_{6}(OH)_{3}]
- IMA symbol: Nln
- Strunz classification: 9.EE.15
- Crystal system: Monoclinic
- Crystal class: Prismatic (2/m) (same H-M symbol)
- Space group: C2/m
- Unit cell: a = 23.24, b = 13.41 c = 7.38 [Å]; β = 105.21°; Z = 2

Identification
- Color: Light to medium brown
- Crystal habit: Coarsely granular to massive
- Cleavage: Perfect on {0001}
- Mohs scale hardness: 5
- Luster: Vitreous, resinous
- Streak: Light brown
- Diaphaneity: Transparent
- Specific gravity: 3.46
- Optical properties: Uniaxial (-)
- Refractive index: n_{ω} = 1.718 n_{ε} = 1.700
- Birefringence: δ = 0.018
- Pleochroism: Visible ε = colorless and ω = light brown

Nelenite is a rare manganese iron phyllosilicate arsenate mineral found in Franklin Furnace, New Jersey.

Its chemical formula is (Mn,Fe)_{16}As_{3}Si_{12}O_{36}(OH)_{17} or (Mn,Fe)_{16}(Si_{12}O_{30})(OH)_{14}[As^{3+}_{3}O_{6}(OH)_{3}]

== Discovery and occurrence ==
It was first describe in 1984 for an occurrence in the Trotter Mine, Franklin Mining District, Sussex County, New Jersey. It was named for Joseph A. Nelen of the Smithsonian Institution. It has also been reported from Montgomery County, Virginia and the Suceava district of Romania. At the type locality in New Jersey it occurs associated with actinolite, calcite, willemite, tirodite, rhodonite, apatite, lennilenapeite, stilpnomelane, microcline and talc.
