= Natrolite =

Zeolite mineral

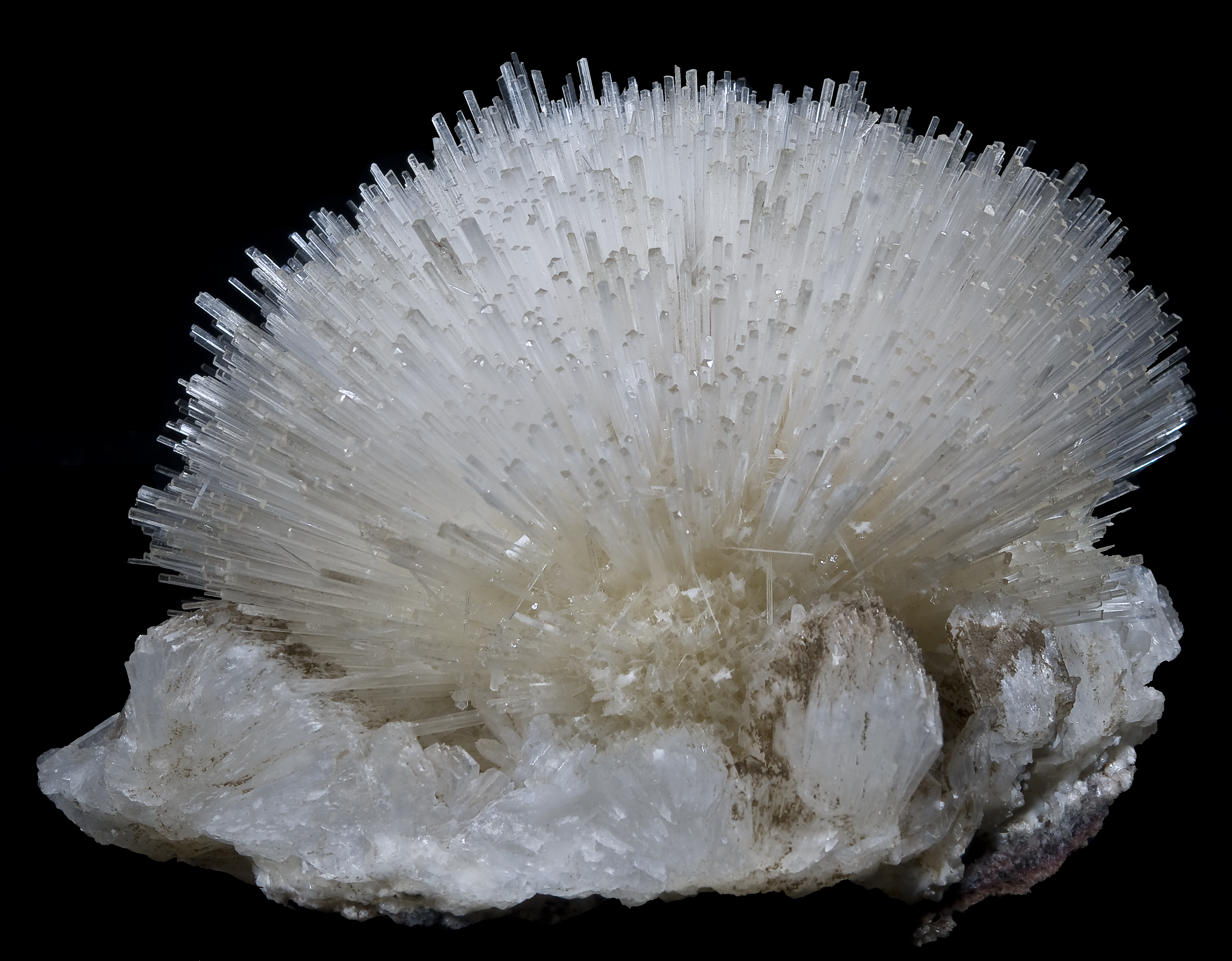

General
- Category: Tectosilicate minerals
- Group: Zeolite group, natrolite subgroup
- Formula: Na_{2}Al_{2}Si_{3}O_{10}·2H_{2}O
- IMA symbol: Ntr
- Strunz classification: 9.GA.05 (10 ed); 8/J.21-10 (8 ed)
- Dana classification: 77.01.05.01
- Crystal system: Orthorhombic
- Crystal class: Pyramidal (mm2); H–M symbol: (mm2)
- Space group: Fdd2
- Unit cell: a = 18.27, b = 18.587 c = 6.56 [Å], Z = 8

Identification
- Formula mass: 380.22 g/mol
- Color: White, colorless, sometimes pink
- Crystal habit: Acicular
- Twinning: On {110}, {011}, {031}
- Cleavage: Perfect on {110}
- Fracture: Irregular, uneven
- Tenacity: Brittle
- Mohs scale hardness: 5–6
- Luster: Vitreous, silky, pearly
- Streak: White
- Diaphaneity: Transparent to translucent
- Specific gravity: 2.25

Natrolite is a tectosilicate mineral species belonging to the zeolite group. It is a hydrated sodium and aluminium silicate with the formula Na_{2}Al_{2}Si_{3}O_{10}·2H_{2}O. The type locality is Hohentwiel, Hegau, Germany.

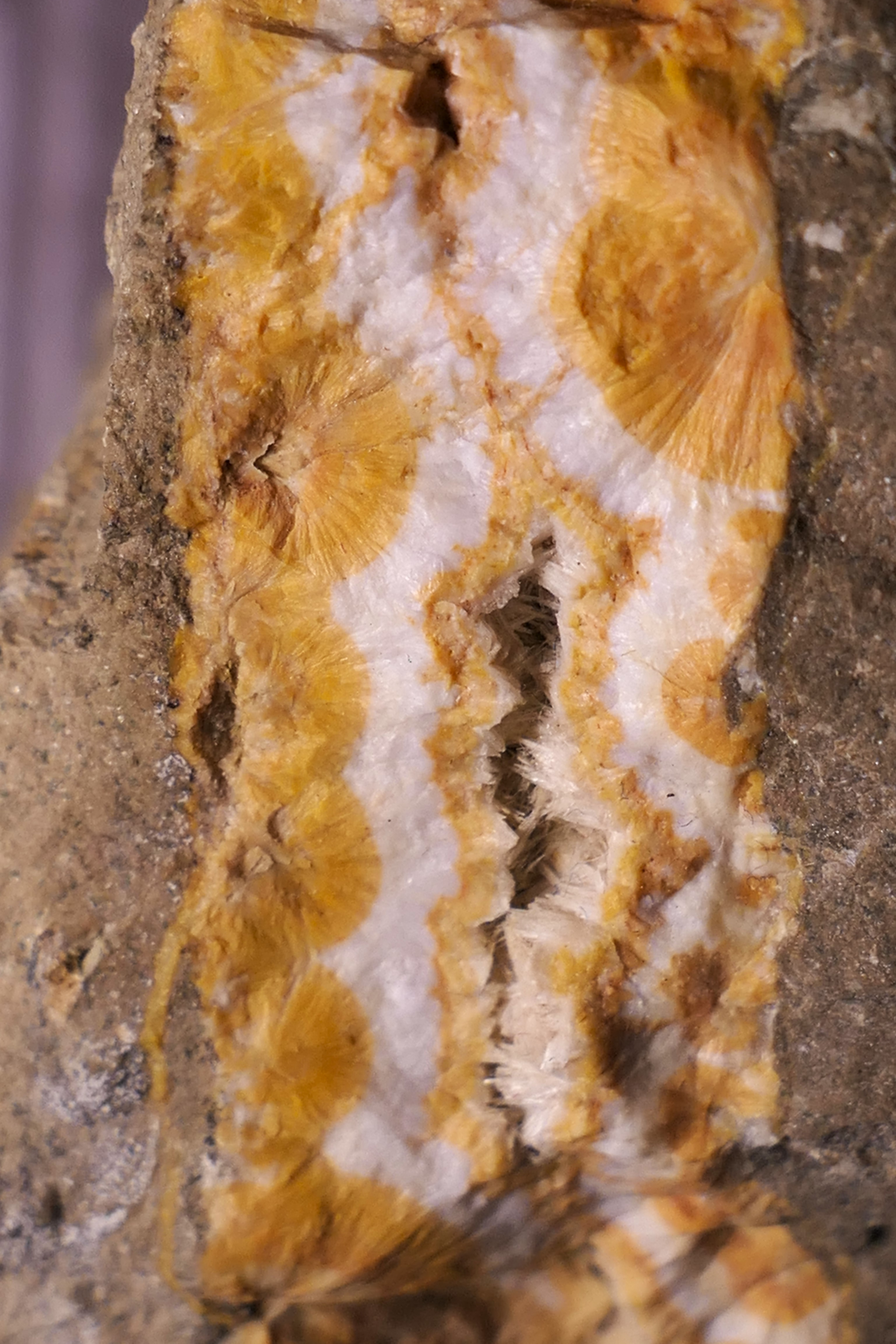
Natrolite needles from Hohentwiel (Typelocality)

It was named natrolite by Martin Heinrich Klaproth in 1803. The name is derived from natron (νατρών), the Greek word for soda, in reference to the sodium content, and lithos (λίθος), meaning stone. Needle stone or needle-zeolite are other informal names, alluding to the common acicular habit of the crystals, which are often very slender and are aggregated in divergent tufts. The crystals are frequently epitaxial overgrowths of natrolite, mesolite, and gonnardite in various orders.

== Properties ==
Larger crystals most commonly have the form of a square prism terminated by a low pyramid, the prism angle being nearly a right angle. The crystals are tetragonal in appearance, though actually orthorhombic. There are perfect cleavages parallel to the faces of the prism. The mineral also often occurs in compact fibrous aggregates, the fibers having a divergent or radial arrangement. Natrolite is readily distinguished from other fibrous zeolites by its optical characteristics.

Between crossed nicols the fibers extinguish parallel to their length, and they do not show an optic figure in convergent polarized light. Natrolite is usually white or colorless, but sometimes reddish or yellowish. The luster is vitreous, or, in finely fibrous specimens, silky.

The specific gravity of natrolite is 2.2, and its hardness is 5.5. The mineral is readily fusible, melting in a candle-flame to which it imparts a yellow color owing to the presence of sodium. It is decomposed by hydrochloric acid with separation of gelatinous silica.

== Environment ==
Natrolite occurs with other zeolites in the amygdaloidal cavities of basaltic igneous rocks. It is also common in nepheline syenites.

== Notable localities ==
Excellent specimens of diverging groups of white prismatic crystals are found in compact basalt at the Puy-deMarman, Puy-de-Dôme, France. Huge crystals have been found on the Kola Peninsula, Russia (30 cm by 13 cm). The walls of cavities in the basalt of the Giants Causeway, in County Antrim, are frequently encrusted with slender needles of natrolite, and similar material is found abundantly in the volcanic rocks (basalt and phonolite) of Salesel, Aussig and several other places in the north of Bohemia. Mont St. Hilaire, Quebec has produced large crystals associated with many rare minerals. The Bay of Fundy in Nova Scotia, New Jersey, Oregon, and British Columbia have also produced excellent specimens.

Several varieties of natrolite have been distinguished: fargite is a red natrolite from Glenfarg in Perthshire; bergmannite or spreustein is an impure variety which has resulted by the alteration of other minerals, chiefly sodalite, in the augite syenite of southern Norway.

Natrolite is one of the closely associated minerals with benitoite, a rare mineral with its type locality in San Benito County, California.

Natrolite forms opaque white spherical inclusions within nodules of translucent green prehnite from Wave Hill, Northern Territory, Australia.

== Images ==
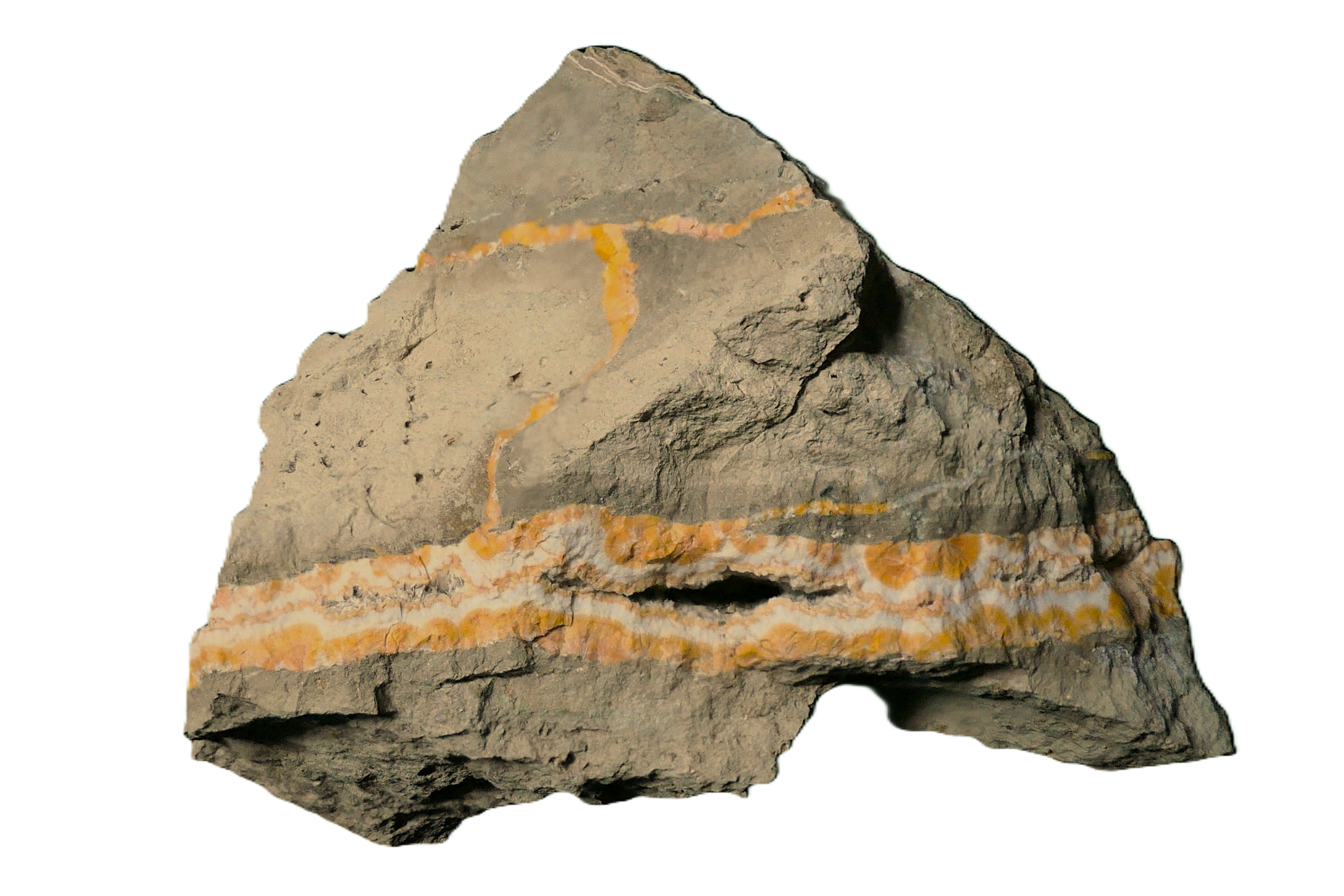
Natrolite from Hohentwiel (Hegau)

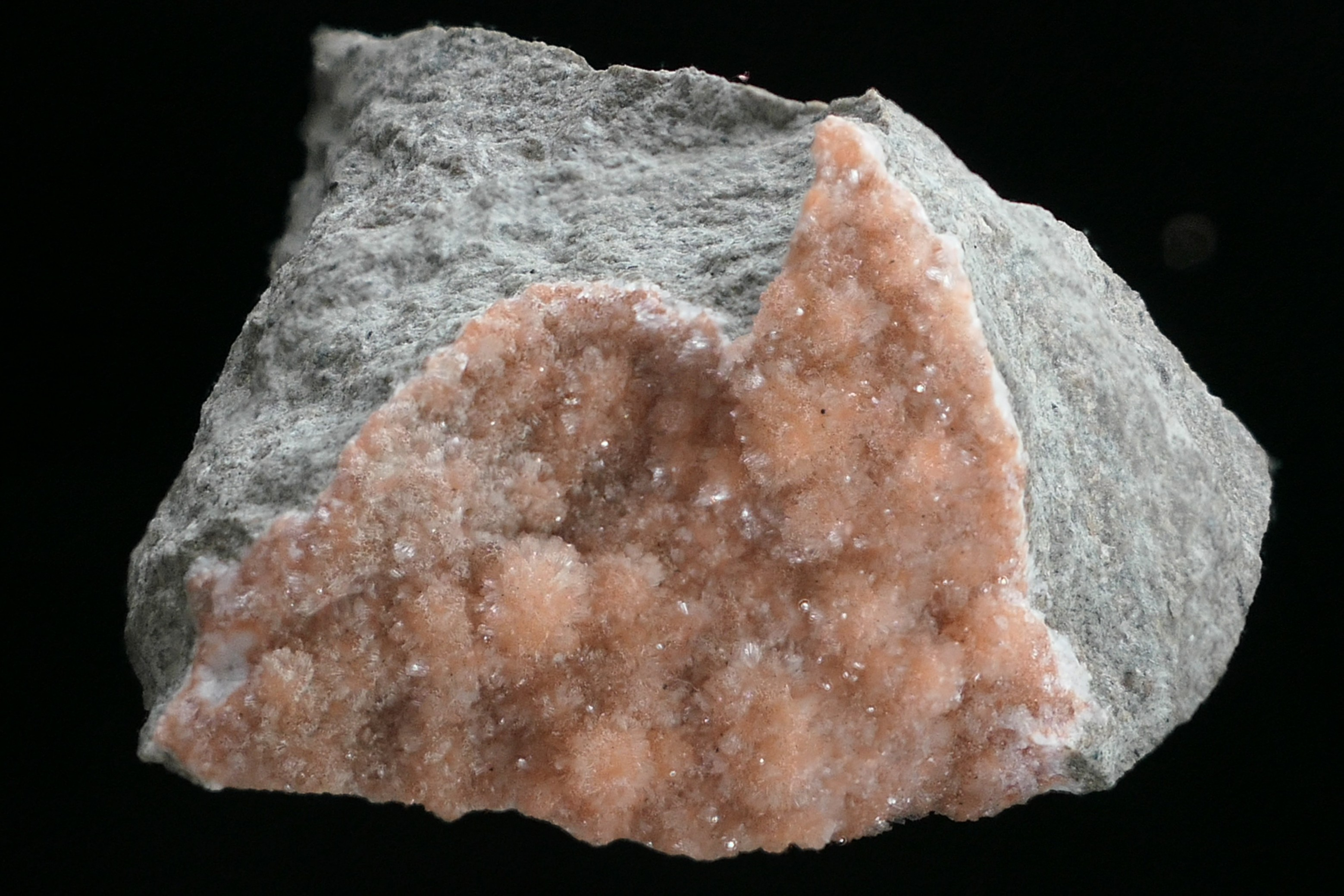
Natrolite from Aussig.

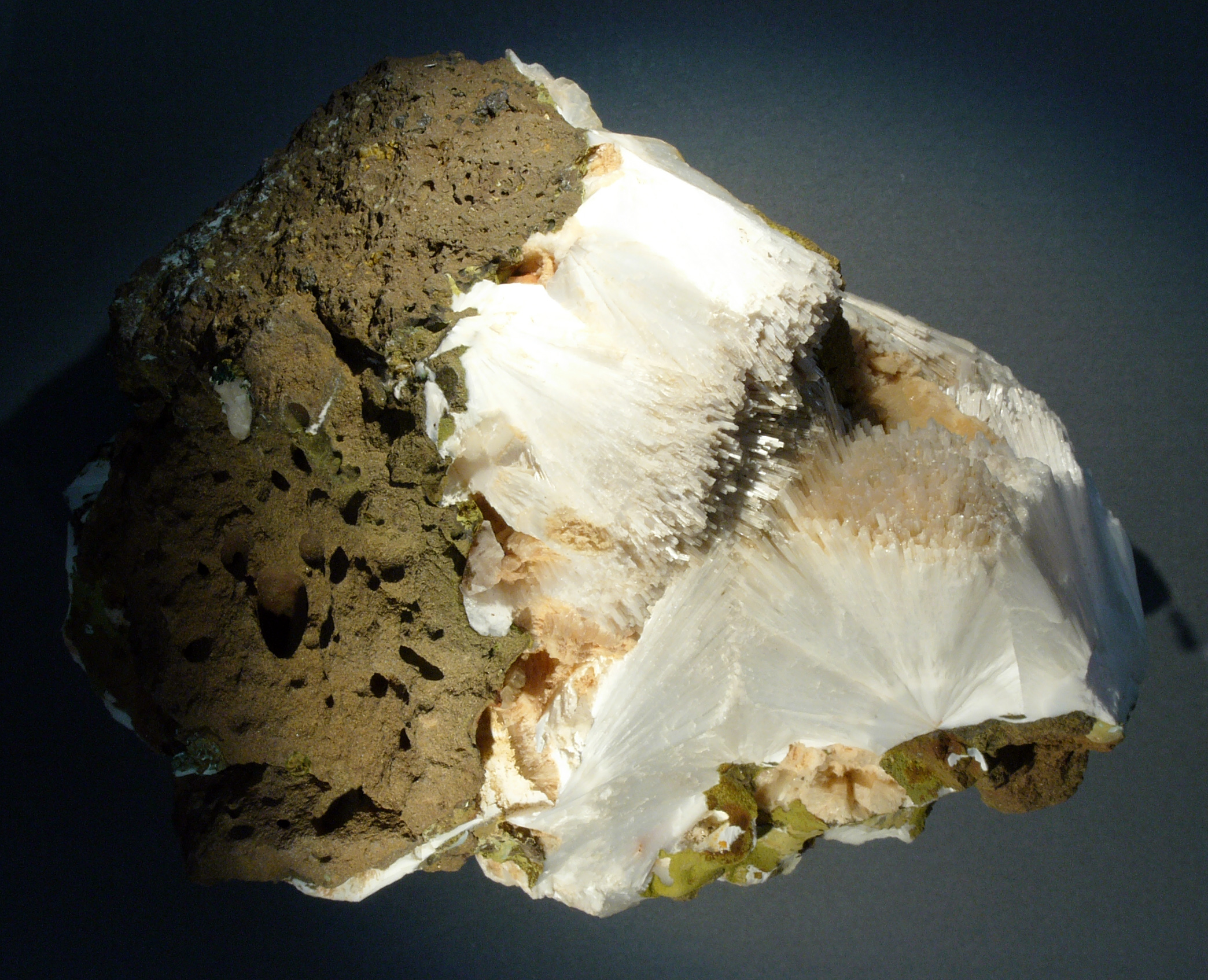
Natrolite from the plateau basalts in east Greenland

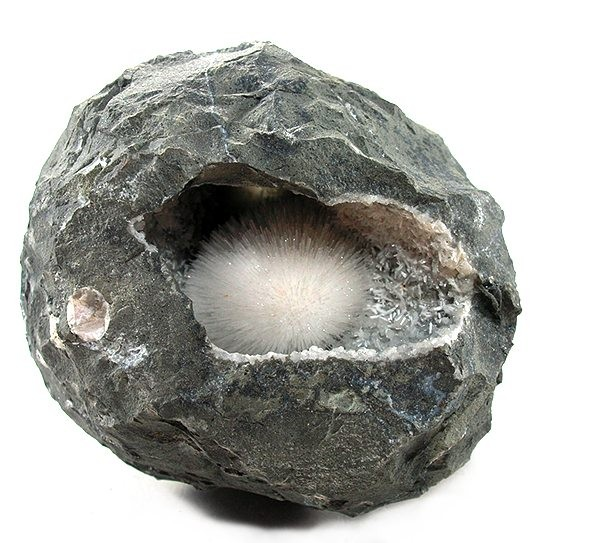
Colorless, radiating natrolite in zeolite pod

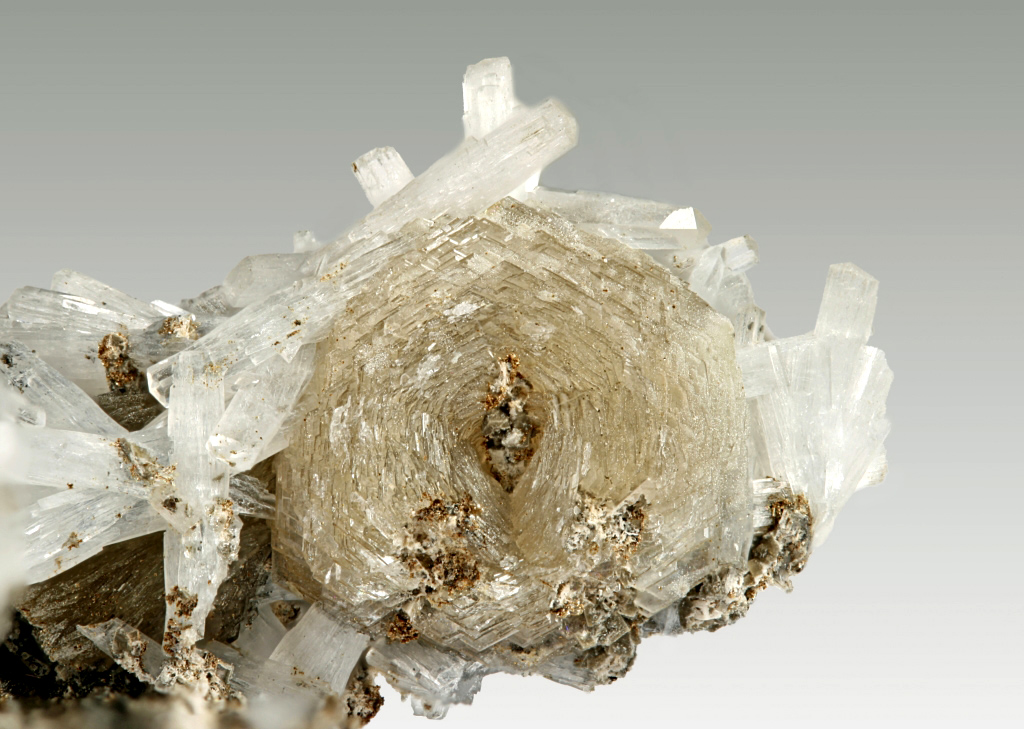
Catapleiite and natrolite from Poudrette quarry, Québec, Canada

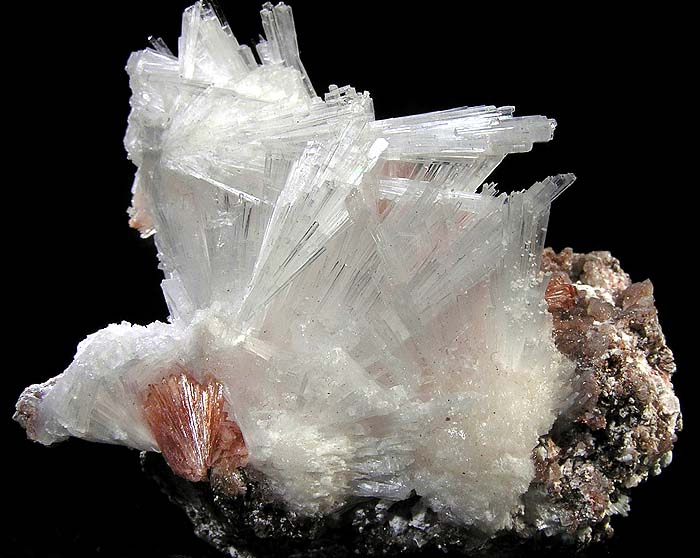
Slender needles of natrolite are accented by deep pink inesites

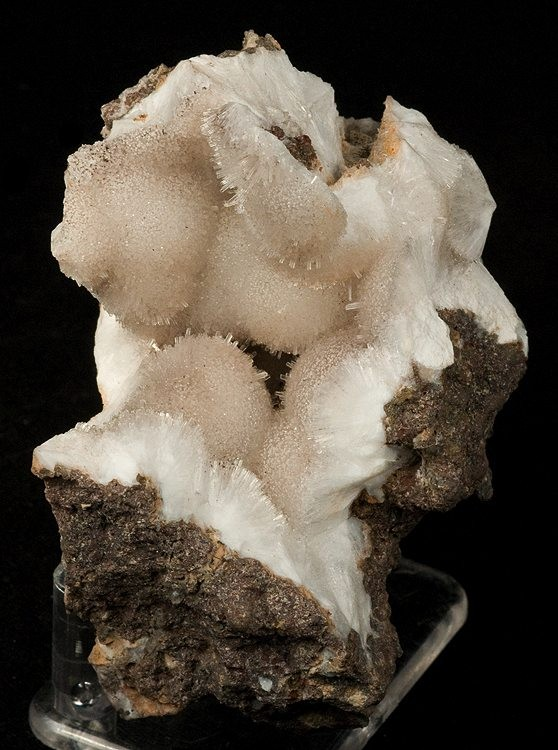
Natrolite in spherical clusters inside protective pocket of volcanic rock

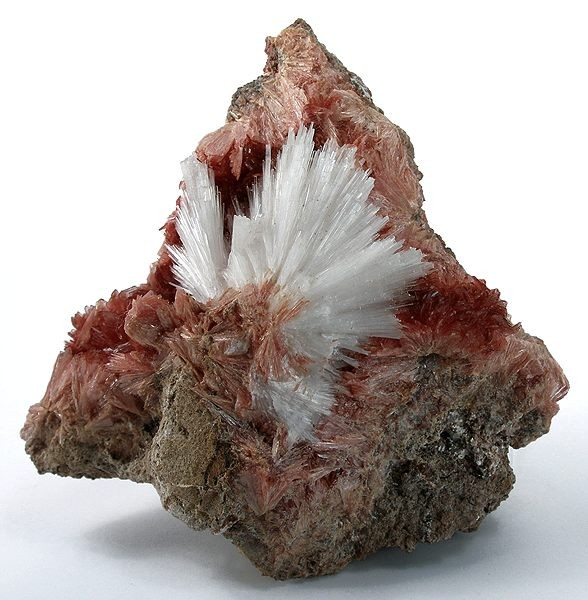
Natrolite sprays of stark white crystals are shooting out from a vug of inesite

== See also ==
- Pressure-induced hydration
