= Neptunite =

Phyllosilicate mineral

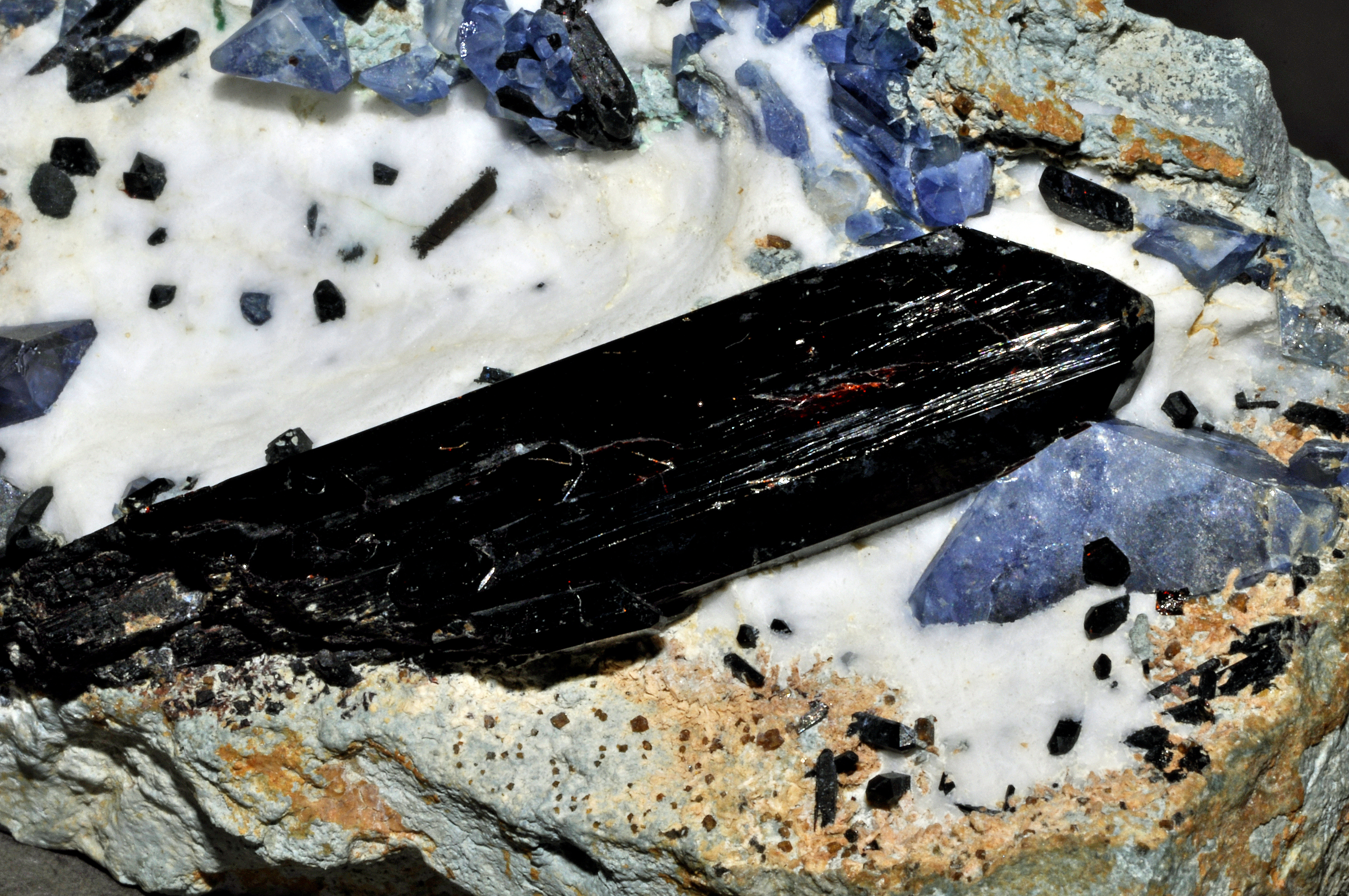
- Neptunite crystals

General
- Category: Phyllosilicate minerals
- Formula: KNa_{2}Li(Fe^{2+},Mn^{2+})_{2}Ti_{2}Si_{8}O_{24}
- IMA symbol: Npt
- Strunz classification: 9.EH.05
- Dana classification: 70.04.01.01
- Crystal system: Monoclinic
- Crystal class: Domatic (m) (same H-M symbol)
- Space group: Cc
- Unit cell: a = 16.427(2), b = 12.478(2) c = 9.975(1) Å; β = 115.56(1)°; Z = 4

Identification
- Color: Black; deep red-brown in thin fragments
- Crystal habit: Prismatic or tabular
- Twinning: Interpenetrant on {301}
- Cleavage: {110} good
- Fracture: Conchoidal
- Tenacity: Brittle
- Mohs scale hardness: 5–6
- Luster: Vitreous
- Streak: Brown to red brown
- Diaphaneity: Nearly opaque
- Specific gravity: 3.19–3.23
- Optical properties: Biaxial (+)
- Refractive index: n_{α} = 1.69–1.6908, n_{β} = 1.6927–1.7, n_{γ} = 1.7194–1.736
- Birefringence: 0.0294–0.0452
- Pleochroism: x = yellow-orange, y = orange, z = deep red
- 2V angle: 36° to 49°
- Other characteristics: Piezoelectric

Neptunite is a silicate mineral with the formula KNa_{2}Li(Fe^{2+}, Mn^{2+})_{2}Ti_{2}Si_{8}O_{24}. With increasing manganese it forms a series with mangan-neptunite. Watatsumiite is the variety with vanadium replacing the titanium in the formula.

It was first described in 1893 for an occurrence in the Narssârssuk pegmatite of West Greenland. It is also found within natrolite veins in glaucophane schist within serpentinite in San Benito County, California, US. It also occurs in Mont Saint-Hilaire, Quebec and in the Kola Peninsula of Russia.

The mineral is named for Neptune, Roman god of the sea because of its association with aegirine from Àgir, the Scandinavian sea-god.

The Gemological Institute of America (GIA) identified an 11.78-carat faceted specimen as neptunite based on Raman spectroscopy.
