= List of minerals named after people =

This is a list of minerals named after people. The chemical composition of the mineral follows the name.

== A ==
- Abelsonite: C_{31}H_{32}N_{4}Ni – American physicist Philip Hauge Abelson (1913–2004)
- Abswurmbachite: Cu^{2+}Mn^{3+}_{6}O_{8}SiO_{4} – German mineralogist Irmgard Abs-Wurmbach (1938–2020)
- Adamite: Zn_{2}AsO_{4}OH – French mineralogist Gilbert Joseph Adam (1795–1881)
- Agrellite: NaCa_{2}Si_{4}O_{10}F – English optical mineralogist Stuart Olof Agrell (1913–1996)
- Agricolaite: K_{4}(UO_{2})(CO_{3})_{3} – German scholar Georgius Agricola (1494–1555)
- Aheylite: Fe^{2+}Al_{6}(PO_{4})_{4}(OH)_{8}·_{4}H_{2}O – American geologist Allen V. Heyl (1918–2008)
- Albrechtschraufite: Ca_{4}Mg(UO_{2})_{2}(CO_{3})_{6}F_{2}·_{17}H_{2}O – Albrecht Schrauf (1837–1897), professor of mineralogy, University of Vienna
- Alexandrite: Variety of chrysoberyl (BeAl_{2}O_{4}): – Russian monarch, Tsar Alexander II of Russia (1818–1881)
- Alforsite: Ba_{5}Cl(PO_{4})_{3} – American geologist John T. Alfors (1930–2005)
- Allabogdanite: (Fe,Ni)_{2}P – Alla Bogdanova (1947–2004), Geological Institute, Kola Science Centre of Russian Academy of Sciences
- Allanite series: sorosilicate – Scottish mineralogist, Thomas Allan (1777–1833)
- Alloriite: Na_{5}K_{1.5}(Al_{6}Si_{6}O_{24})(SO_{4})(OH)_{0.5}·H_{2}O – Italian mineralogist Roberto Allori (born 1933)
- Almeidaite: crichtonite group (metal titanates); Brazilian geologist Fernando Flávio Marques de Almeida (1916–2013)
- Anandite: (Ba,K)(Fe^{2+},Mg)_{3}(Si,Al,Fe)_{4}O_{10}(S,OH)_{2} – Ceylonese metaphysician, historian and philosopher Ananda Coomaraswamy (1877–1947), first director of the Mineral Survey of Ceylon
- Andersonite: Na_{2}Ca(UO_{2})(CO_{3})_{3}·6H_{2}O – Charles Alfred Anderson (1902–1990), United States Geological Survey
- Andradite: Ca_{3}Fe_{2}Si_{3}O_{12} – Brazilian statesman, naturalist, professor and poet José Bonifácio de Andrade e Silva (1763–1838)
- Andychristyite: PbCuTeO_{5}(H_{2}O) – Welsh-Australian mineralogist Andrew G. Christy (1963–)
- Ankerite: CaFe^{2+}(CO_{3})_{2} – Austrian mineralogist Matthias Joseph Anker (1771–1843)
- Anthonyite: Cu(OH)_{2}·3H_{2}O – John Williams Anthony (1920–1992), professor of mineralogy, University of Arizona
- Argandite: Mn_{7}(VO_{4})_{2}(OH)_{8} – Swiss geologist Émile Argand (1879–1940)
- Artinite: Mg_{2}(CO_{3})(OH)_{2}·_{3}H_{2}O – Italian mineralogist, Ettore Artini (1866–1928)
- Arfvedsonite: Na_{3}(Fe,Mg)_{4}FeSi_{8}O_{22}(OH)_{2} – Swedish chemist Johan August Arfwedson (1792–1841)
- Armalcolite: (Mg,Fe^{2+})Ti_{2}O_{5} – American astronauts ARM Neil Armstrong, AL Buzz Aldrin and COL Michael Collins
- Armbrusterite: K_{5}Na_{3}Mn^{3+}Mn^{2+}_{14}[Si_{9}O_{22}]_{4}(OH)_{10}·4H_{2}O – Swiss crystallographer Thomas Armbruster (born 1950), University of Bern
- Armstrongite: CaZr[Si_{6}O_{15}]·3H_{2}O – American astronaut Neil Armstrong (1930–2012)
- Arthurite: CuFe_{2}^{3+}[(OH,O)|(AsO_{4},PO_{4},SO_{4})]_{2}·4H_{2}O – British mineralogists Arthur Edward Ian Montagu Russell and Arthur W. G. Kingsbury
- Atencioite: Ca_{2}Fe^{2+}_{3}Mg_{2}Be_{4}(PO_{4})_{6}(OH)_{4}·6H_{2}O – Daniel Atencio, professor of mineralogy, Geoscience Institute, University of São Paulo
- Avicennite: Tl_{2}O_{3} – Persian scholar and physician Avicenna (980–1037)

== B ==
- Backite (IMA2013-113)
- Bandylite (6.AC.35)
- Baumhauerite: Pb_{3}As_{4}S_{9} – German mineralogist Heinrich Adolph Baumhauer (1848–1926)
- Bazzite: Be_{3}(Sc,Fe)_{2}Si_{6}O_{18} – Italian engineer Alessandro E. Bazzi
- Benstonite: Ba_{6}Ca_{6}Mg(CO_{3})_{13} – Orlando J. Benston (1901–1966), an ore-dressing metallurgist with the University of Illinois
- Bentorite: Ca_{6}(Cr,Al)_{2}(SO_{4})_{3}(OH)_{12}·26H_{2} – Israeli geologist Yaakov Ben-Tor (1910–2002)
- Berthierite: FeSb_{2}S_{4} – French geologist and mining engineer Pierre Berthier (1782–1861)
- Bertrandite: Be_{4}Si_{2}O_{7}(OH)_{2} – French mineralogist Emile Bertrand (1844–1909)
- Berzelianite: Cu_{2}Se – Swedish chemist Jöns Jakob Berzelius (1779–1848)
- Berzeliite: NaCa_{2}Mg_{2}(AsO_{4})_{3} and manganberzeliite – Swedish chemist Jöns Jacob Berzelius (1779–1848)
- Bettertonite: [Al_{6}(AsO_{4})_{3}(OH)_{9}(H_{2}O)_{5}]・11H_{2}O – John Betterton (b. 1959, London), museum geologist and mineralogist at Haslemere Educational Museum in Surrey, England
- Beudantite: PbFe^{3+}_{3}(AsO_{4})(SO_{4})(OH)_{6} – François Sulpice Beudant (1787–1850) French mineralogist, University of Paris, Paris
- Bezsmertnovite: Au_{4}Cu(Te,Pb) – Russian mineralogists Vladimir (1912–2002) and Marianna Bezsmertnaya (1915–1991).
- Bideauxite (3.DB.25)
- Bilibinskite: Au_{2}Cu_{2}PbTe^{2+} – Soviet geologist Yuri A. Bilibin (1901–1952)
- Biringuccite: Na_{2}B_{5}O_{8}(OH) · 2 H_{2}O – Vannoccio Biringuccio (1480–1538/9), Italian alchemist, metallurgist
- Bixbite: Be_{3}(AlMn)_{2}Si_{6}O_{18} – American mineralogist Maynard Bixby; deprecated to red beryl to avoid confusion with bixbyite
- Bixbyite: (Fe,Mn)_{2}O_{3} – American mineralogist Maynard Bixby
- Blödite: Na_{2}Mg(SO_{4})_{2} · 4 H_{2}O – German chemist Carl August Blöde (1773–1820)
- Blossite: αCu_{2}V_{2}O_{7} – mineralogist Donald F. Bloss, Virginia Polytechnic Institute
- Bobdownsite (discredited)
- Bobfergusonite: Na_{2}Mn^{2+}_{5}Fe^{3+}Al(PO_{4})_{6} – Robert Bury Ferguson, University of Manitoba
- Boehmite: γ-AlO(OH) – Bohemian-German chemist Johann Böhm (1895–1952)
- Bornite: Cu_{5}FeS_{4} – Austrian mineralogist Ignaz von Born (1742–1791)
- Bonazziite: As_{4}S_{4} – Paola Bonazzi, Italian professor of mineralogy and crystallography at the University of Florence (1960–2024)
- Bournonite: PbCuSbS_{3} – French crystallographer and mineralogist Jacques Louis de Bournon (1751–1825)
- Braggite: PtS – the first mineral characterized by X-ray analysis. William Henry Bragg (1862–1942) and his son, William Lawrence Bragg (1890–1971)
- Brandtite: Ca_{2}Mn^{2+}(AsO_{4})_{2} · 2 H_{2}O – Swedish chemist Georg Brandt (1694–1768)
  - And parabrandtite
- Breithauptite: NiSb – Saxon mineralogist Johann Friedrich August Breithaupt (1791–1873)
- Brewsterite series (9.GE.20)
- Briartite: Cu_{2}(Zn,Fe)GeS_{4} – Belgian geologist Gaston Briart
- Brookite: TiO_{2} – English mineralogist Henry James Brooke (1771–1857)
- Brownleeite MnSi – American astrobiologist Donald E. Brownlee (1943–), professor of astronomy at University of Washington at Seattle, leading head of the Stardust mission
- Brucite: Mg(OH)_{2} – American mineralogist Archibald Bruce (1777–1818)
- Buddingtonite: NH_{4}AlSi_{3}O_{8} – American Petrologist Arthur Francis Buddington (1890–1980)
- Burnsite: KCdCu^{2+}_{7}(SeO_{3})_{2}O_{2}Cl_{9} – Peter Carman Burns (born 1966), University of Notre Dame, Notre Dame, Indiana
  Thompson ISI top ten most highly cited geoscientists (1996–2007)
- Burtite: CaSn(OH)_{6} – American mining geologist Donald McLain Burt (born 1943)
- Buseckite: (Fe,Zn,Mn)S – American geologist Peter R. Buseck, Arizona State University

== C ==
- Cabriite: Pd_{2}SnCu – Canadian mineralogist Louis J. Cabri (born 1934)
- Cámaraite: sorosilicate – Fernando Cámara (born 1967), mineralogist of Melilla, Spain
- Cancrinite: Na_{6}Ca_{2}[(CO_{3})_{2} – Georg von Cancrin (1774–1845)
- Canfieldite: Ag_{8}SnS_{6} – American mining engineer Frederick Alexander Canfield (1849–1926)
- Cannonite: Bi_{2}(OH)_{2}SO_{4} – American mineralogist and electron microprobe analyst Benjamin Bartlett (Bart) Cannon
- Carlfriesite: CaTe^{4+}_{2}Te^{6+}O_{8} – American researcher at the Institute of Geology of the National university of Mexico Carl Fries, Jr (1910–1965).
- Carlhintzeite: Ca_{2}AlF_{7} · H_{2}O – German mineralogist Carl Hintze (1851–1916), University of Breslau
- Carlosruizite: K_{6}(Na,K)_{4}Na_{6}Mg_{10}(SeO_{4})_{12}(IO_{3})_{12} · 12 H_{2}O – Chilean geologist Carlos Ruiz Fuller (1916–1997), founder of the Chilean Geological Survey
- Carnallite: KMgCl_{3} · 6 H_{2}O – Prussian mining engineer, Rudolf von Carnall (1804–1874)
- Carnotite: K_{2}(UO_{2})_{2}(VO_{4})_{2} – French mining engineer and chemist Marie Adolphe Carnot (1839–1920)
- Cassidyite: Ca_{2}Ni_{0.75}Mg_{0.25}(PO_{4})_{2} · 2 H_{2}O – American geologist William A. Cassidy
- Castaingite (discredited 1967: a mixture of cuprian molybdenite and gerhardtite)
- Caswellsilverite: NaCrS_{2} – American geologist, entrepreneur, and oilman Caswell Silver (1916–1988)
- Cattiite: Mg_{3}(PO_{4})_{2} · 22H_{2}O – Michele Catti (b. 1945), Professor of Physical Chemistry, University of Milano-Bicocca, Italy
- Celsian: BaAl_{2}Si_{2}O_{8} – Swedish astronomer and naturalist Anders Celsius (1701–1744)
  - And paracelsian
- Cernyite: Cu_{2}CdSnS_{4} – Canadian mineralogist Petr Cerny
- Cesbronite: Cu_{6}(TeO_{3})_{2}(OH)_{6} · 2 H_{2}O – French mineralogist Fabian Cesbron (1938–)
- Chrisstanleyite: Ag_{2}Pd_{3}Se_{4} – British mineralogist Christopher John Stanley
- Clarkeite: Na[(UO_{2})O(OH)](H_{2}O)_{0–1} – American mineral chemist and former chief chemist of the United States Geological Survey Frank Wigglesworth Clarke (1847–1931)
- Cleveite (uraninite var.): UO_{2} · UO_{3} · PO · ThO_{2} – Swedish chemist Per Teodor Cleve (1840–1905)
- Clintonite: Ca(Mg,Al)_{3}(Al_{3}Si)O_{10}(OH)_{2} – American statesman De Witt Clinton (1769–1828)
- Coesite (form of SiO_{2}): – American chemist Loring Coes, Jr. (1915–1978)
- Coffinite: U(SiO_{4})_{1−x}(OH)_{4x} – American geologist Reuben Clare Coffin
- Cohenite: (Fe,Ni,Co)_{3}C – German mineralogist and petrographer Emil Cohen (1842–1905)
- Colemanite: Ca_{2}B_{6}O_{11} · 5 H_{2}O – mine owner William T. Coleman (1824–1893)
- Collinsite: Ca_{2}Mg(PO_{4})_{2} · 2 H_{2}O – William Henry Collins (1878–1937), director of the Geological Survey of Canada
- Columbite: Fe^{2+}Nb_{2}O_{6} – Genoese explorer Christopher Columbus (c. 1451–1506)
  - And manganocolumbite, ferrocolumbite, and Yttrocolumbite
- Cooperite: (Pt,Pd,Ni)S – South African metallurgist Richard A. Cooper (1890–1972)
- Cordierite: (Mg,Fe)_{2}Al_{4}Si_{5}O_{18} to (Fe,Mg)_{2}Al_{4}Si_{5}O_{18} – French geologist Louis Cordier (1777–1861)
- Covellite: CuS – Italian mineralogist Niccolo Covelli (1790–1829)
- Criddleite (2.LA.25)
- Cronstedtite: (Fe^{2+},Fe^{3+})_{3}(Si,Fe^{3+})_{2}O_{5}(OH)_{4} – Swedish mineralogist Axel Fredrik Cronstedt (1722–1765)
- Crookesite: Cu_{7}(Tl,Ag)Se_{4} – English chemist and physicist Sir William Crookes (1832–1919)
- Cuprosklodowskite: Cu(UO_{2})_{2}(HSiO_{4})_{2}·6(H_{2}O) – Polish and naturalised-French physicist and chemist Marie Curie (1867–1934)

== D ==
- Daliranite: PbHgAs_{2}S_{6} – Farahnaz Daliran, University of Karlsruhe, Germany
- Dalyite: K_{2}ZrSi_{6}O_{15} – Reginald Aldworth Daly (1871–1957), Harvard University
- Danalite: Be_{3}Fe^{2+}_{4}(SiO_{4})_{3}S – American geologist, mineralogist and zoologist James Dwight Dana (1813–1895)
- Danielsite: (Cu,Ag)_{14}HgS_{8} – Geologist John L. Daniels (1931–), active in the geological survey of western Australia
- Davinciite: Na_{12}K_{3}Ca_{6}Fe^{2+}_{3}Zr_{3} – Italian polymath Leonardo da Vinci (1452–1519 )
- Davyne (9.FB.05)
- Dawsonite: NaAlCO_{3}(OH)_{2} – Canadian geologist Sir John William Dawson (1820–1899)
- Deanesmithite: Hg^{+}_{2}Hg^{2+}_{3}Cr^{6+}O_{5}S_{2} – Deane K. Smith (1930–2001), professor of geosciences, Penn State University
- Deerite: Fe^{2+}_{6}Fe^{3+}_{3}(Si_{6}O_{17})O_{3}(OH)_{5} – William Alexander Deer (1910–2009), mineralogist-petrologist, Cambridge University, Cambridge
- Delafossite: CuFeO_{2} – French mineralogist Gabriel Delafosse (1796–1878)
- Dellaite: Ca_{6}(Si_{2}O_{7})(SiO_{4})(OH)_{2} – geochemist, Della M. Roy (1926–2021)
- Delrioite: SrCaV^{5+}_{2}O_{6}(OH)_{2} · 3 H_{2}O – Spanish–Mexican scientist and naturalist Andrés Manuel del Río (1764–1849)
  - And calciodelrioite
- Demesmaekerite: Pb_{2}Cu_{5}(UO_{2})_{2}(SeO_{3})_{6}(OH)_{6}·2H_{2}O – Belgian geologist Gaston Demesmaeker (1911–1997)
- Descloizite: PbZnVO_{4}(OH) – Alfred Lewis Oliver Legrand Des Cloizeaux (1817–1897), professor of mineralogy, University of Paris, Paris
  - And arsendescloizite
- Dessauite-(Y) (Sr,Pb)(Y,U)(Ti,Fe^{3+})_{20}O_{38} – Italian mineralogist Gabor Dessau (1907–1983)
- Devilline: CaCu_{4}(SO_{4})_{2}(OH)_{6}·3H_{2}O – French chemist Henri Etienne Sainte-Claire Deville (1818–1881)
- Dickite: Al_{2}Si_{2}O_{5}(OH)_{4} – Scottish metallurgical chemist Allan Brugh Dick (1833–1926)
- Djerfisherite: K_{6}CuFe_{24}S_{26}Cl or K_{6}Na(Fe,Cu)_{24}S_{26}Cl – American mineralogist Daniel Jerome Fisher (1896–1988), professor at the University of Chicago
- Dollaseite-(Ce): CaCeMg_{2}AlSi_{3}O_{11}F(OH) – American geologist Wayne A. Dollase (born 1938), geology professor at UCLA
- Dolomite: CaMg(CO_{3})_{2} – French naturalist and geologist Déodat Gratet de Dolomieu (1750–1801)
- Domeykite: Cu_{3}As – Polish geologist, mineralogist and educator Ignacy Domeyko (1802–1889)
- Donnayite: NaCaSr_{3}Y(CO_{3})_{6} · 3 H_{2}O – Canadian professors J. D. H. Donnay and G. Donnay
- Dumortierite: Al_{6.5–7}BO_{3}(SiO_{4})_{3}(O,OH)_{3} – French paleontologist Eugene Dumortier (1803–1873)
- Davemaoite: Cubic CaSiO_{3}– Mineral physicist Ho-kwang Mao

== E ==
- Erikapohlite (IMA2010-090) – German collector of minerals Erika Pohl-Ströher (1919–2016)
- Ernienickelite: NiMn_{3}O_{7}·3H_{2}O – Canadian-Australian mineralogist Ernest (Ernie) H. Nickel (1925–2009)
- Ernstburkeite: Mg(CH_{3}SO_{3})_{2}·12H_{2}O – mineralogist Ernst A. J. Burke, former Head of the CNMNC (IMA)
- Eskolaite: Cr_{2}O_{3} – Finnish geologist Pentti Eelis Eskola (1883–1964)
- Esperite: PbCa_{3}Zn_{4}(SiO_{4})_{4} – American petrologist Esper S. Larsen Jr. (1879–1961), Harvard University (Originally called calcium larsenite)
- Evansite: Al_{3}(PO_{4})(OH)_{6}·6H_{2}O – British nickel refiner, weapons manufacturer and geologist Brooke Evans (1797–1862)

== F ==
- Farringtonite: Mg_{3}(PO_{4})_{2} – American geologist Oliver C. Farrington (1864–1933)
- Ferberite: FeWO_{4} – German amateur mineralogist Moritz Rudolph Ferber (1805–1875)
- Ferrierite: (Na,K)_{2}Mg(Si,Al)_{18}O_{36}(OH) · 9 H_{2}O – Canadian geologist and mining engineer Walter Frederick Ferrier (1865–1950)
- Ferri-obertiite: amphiboles – Italian mineralogist Roberta Oberti (born 1951)
  - And ferro-ferri-obertiite
- Fergusonite: (Ce,La,Nd)NbO_{4} – British politician and mineral collector Robert Ferguson of Raith (1767–1840)
- Ferraioloite (IMA2015-066)
- Fleischerite: Pb_{3}Ge(SO_{4})_{2}(OH)_{6} · 3 H_{2}O – American mineralogist and geochemist Michael Fleischer (1908–1998)
- Fingerite: Cu_{11}(VO_{4})_{6}O_{2} – American mineralogist and crystallographer Larry W. Finger (born 1940)
- Foordite: Sn^{2+}Nb_{2}O_{6} – American mineralogist Eugene Edward Foord (1946–1998)
- Forsterite: Mg_{2}SiO_{4} – German naturalist Johann Reinhold Forster (1729–1798)
- Franckeite: Pb_{5}Sn_{3}Sb_{2}S_{14} – mining engineers Carl Francke and Ernest Francke
- Frankhawthorneite: Cu_{2}Te^{6+}O_{4}(OH)_{2} – Frank C. Hawthorne (born 1946), University of Manitoba, Winnipeg
  Thompson ISI top ten most highly cited geoscientists (1996–2007)
- Freieslebenite: AgPbSbS_{3} – Mining Commissioner of Saxony Johann Karl Freiesleben (1774–1846)
- Friedrichite: Cu_{5}Pb_{5}Bi_{7}S_{18} – Austrian geologist Othmar Michael Friedrich (1902–1991)
- Fuchsite (variety of muscovite): K(Al,Cr)_{3}Si_{3}O_{10}(OH)_{2} – German mineralogist and chemist Johann Nepomuk von Fuchs (1774–1856)

== G ==
- Gadolinite: (Ce,La,Nd,Y)_{2}FeBe_{2}Si_{2}O_{10} – Finnish mineralogist and chemist Johan Gadolin (1760–1852)
- Gagarinite series: Na(REE_{x}Ca_{(1-x)})(REE_{y}Ca_{(1-y)})F_{6} – Russian cosmonaut Yuri Gagarin (1934–1968)
- Gahnite: ZnAl_{2}O_{4} – Swedish chemist Johan Gottlieb Gahn (1745–1818)
- Gatehouseite: Mn^{2+}_{5}(PO_{4})_{2}(OH)_{4} – crystal chemist Bryan M. K. C. Gatehouse (born 1932), Monash University, Melbourne
- Gaylussite: Na_{2}Ca(CO_{3})_{2}·5H_{2}O – French chemist Joseph Louis Gay-Lussac (1778–1850)
- Geikielite: MgTiO_{3} – Scottish geologist Archibald Geikie (1835–1924)
- Genkinite: (Pt,Pd)_{4}Sb_{3} – Soviet mineralogist A. D. Genkin
- Georgerobinsonite: Pb_{4}(CrO_{4})_{2}(OH)_{2}FCl – George Willard Robinson
- Gerhardtite: Cu_{2}(NO_{3})(OH)_{3} – Alsatian chemist Charles Frédéric Gerhardt
- Gibbsite: Al(OH)_{3} – American mineralogist George Gibbs (1777–1834)
- Uintaite (syn. gilsonite, asphalt) – American Samuel H. Gilson
- Ferri-ghoseite: ☐[Mn^{2+}Na][Mg_{4}Fe^{3+}]Si_{8}O_{22}(OH)_{2} – Subrata Ghose (born 1932), emeritus professor at the University of Washington, Seattle
- Goethite: FeOOH – German polymath Johann Wolfgang von Goethe (1749–1832)
- Julgoldite: sorosilicate – American mineralogist and geochemist Julian Royce Goldsmith (1918–1999)
- Gormanite: Fe^{2+}_{3}Al_{4}(PO_{4})_{4}(OH)_{6}·2H_{2}O – mineralogist Donald Herbert Gorman, University of Toronto
- Grandidierite: (Mg,Fe^{2+})Al_{3}(BO_{3})(SiO_{4})O_{2} – French explorer Alfred Grandidier (1836–1912).
- Gregoryite: (Na_{2},K_{2},Ca)CO_{3} – British geologist and author John Walter Gregory (1864–1932)
- Greigite: Fe^{2+}Fe^{3+}_{2}S_{4} – mineralogist and physical chemist Joseph W. Greig (1895–1977)
- Grossite: CaAl_{4}O_{7} – Israeli mineralogist and geologist Shulamit Gross (1923–2012)
- Grothite (titanite var., 9.AG.15)
- Grunerite: Fe_{7}Si_{8}O_{22}(OH)_{2} – Swiss-French chemist Emmanuel-Louis Gruner (1809–1883)
- Guettardite: Pb(Sb,As)_{2}S_{4} – French naturalist Jean-Étienne Guettard (1715–1786)
- Guilleminite: Ba(UO_{2})_{3}(SeO_{3})_{2}(OH)_{4}·3H_{2}O – French chemist and mineralogist Jean Claude Guillemin (1923–1994)
- Gunterite: Na_{4}(H_{2}O)16(H_{2}V_{10}O_{28}) · 6 H_{2}O – American mineralogist Mickey Gunter (born 1953)
- Gunningite: (Zn,Mn^{2+})SO_{4}·H_{2}O – Canadian geologist and academic Henry C. Gunning (1901–1991)

== H ==
- Haggertyite: Ba(Fe^{2+}_{6}Ti_{5}Mg)O_{19} – American geophysicist Stephen E. Haggerty (born 1938)
- Haidingerite: Ca(AsO_{3}OH) · H_{2}O – Austrian mineralogist Wilhelm Karl Ritter von Haidinger (1795–1871)
- Halloysite: Al_{2}Si_{2}O_{5}(OH)_{4} – Belgian geologist Omalius d'Halloy
- Hambergite: Be_{2}BO_{3}OH – Swedish mineralogist Axel Hamberg (1863–1933)
- Hanksite: Na_{22}K(SO_{4})_{9}(CO_{3})_{2}Cl – Henry Garber Hanks (1826–1907), first state mineralogist of California
- Hapkeite: Fe_{2}Si – American planetary scientist Bruce Hapke
- Hausmannite: Mn^{2+}Mn^{3+}_{2}O_{4} – Friedrich Ludwig Hausmann (1782–1859), professor of mineralogy, University of Göttingen, Göttingen
- Hawleyite: CdS – Canadian mineralogist James Edwin Hawley (1897–1965)
- Hazenite: KNaMg_{2}(PO_{4})_{2} · 14 H_{2}O – Robert M. Hazen of the Carnegie Institute
- Håleniusite-(La): (La,Ce)OF – Ulf Hålenius, director of the mineralogy department at the Swedish Museum of Natural History in Stockholm, Sweden
- Hauyne: Na_{3}Ca(Si_{3}Al_{3})O_{12}(SO_{4}) – French mineralogist René Just Haüy (1743–1822)
- Heinrichite: Ba(UO_{2})_{2}(AsO_{4})_{2} · 10–12 H_{2}O – mineralogist Eberhardt William Heinrich (1918–1991)
- Hendricksite: KZn_{3}(Si_{3}Al)O_{10}(OH)_{2} – American agriculturist Sterling B. Hendricks (1902–1981)
- Herbertsmithite: ZnCu_{3}(OH)_{6}Cl_{2} – British mineralogist Herbert Smith (1872–1953)
- Hessite: Ag_{2}Te – Swiss-born Russian chemist Germain Henri Hess (1802–1850)
- Heyite (identical with calderonite, 8.BG.05)
- Heulandite series: (Ca,Na)_{2–3}Al_{3}(Al,Si)_{2}Si_{13}O_{36} · 12 H_{2}O – English mineral collector Henry Heuland (1778–1856)
- Hiddenite (green variety of spodumene): – American geologist William Earl Hidden (1853–1918)
- Högbomite (renamed to magnesiohögbomite-2N2S): (Al,Mg,Fe,Ti)_{22}(O,OH)_{32} – Swedish geologist Arvid Högbom (1857–1940)
  - And ferrohögbomite-2N2S, magnesiohögbomite series and zincohögbomite series
- Holmquistite: (Li_{2})(Mg_{3}Al_{2})(Si_{8}O_{22})(OH)_{2} – Swedish petrologist Per Johan Holmquist (1866–1946)
- Holtite: (Ta_{0.6}◻_{0.4})Al_{6}BSi_{3}O_{18}(O,OH)_{2.25} – Harold Holt (1908–1967), prime minister of Australia
- Hopeite: Zn_{3}(PO_{4})_{2}·4H_{2}O – Scottish chemist Thomas Charles Hope (1766–1844)
- Howieite: inosilicate with 4-periodic single chain – Robert Andrew Howie (1923–2012), British petrologist and mineralogist of King's College, London University, London
- Howlite: Ca_{2}B_{5}SiO_{9}(OH)_{5} – Canadian chemist, mineralogist Henry How (1828–1879)
- Hübnerite: MnWO_{4} – German mineralogist Adolf Huebner
- Hurlbutite (8.AA.15)
- Hutchinsonite: (Tl,Pb)_{2}As_{5}S_{9} – Cambridge mineralogist Arthur Hutchinson (1866–1937)
- Huttonite: ThSiO_{4} – New Zealand-American mineralogist Colin Osborne Hutton (1910–1971)
- Hyršlite: Pb_{8}As_{10}Sb_{6}S_{32} – Czech mineralogist and gemmologist Jaroslav Hyršl (born 1962)

== J ==
- Jarosewichite: Mn^{2+}_{3}Mn^{3+}(AsO_{4})(OH)_{6} – American chemist Eugene Jarosewich
- Jeanbandyite (4.FC.15)
- Jimthompsonite: (Mg,Fe)_{5}Si_{6}O_{16}(OH)_{2} – American mineralogist James Burleigh Thompson, Jr.
- Johnbaumite: (Ca)_{5}(AsO_{4})_{3}(OH) – American geologist and mineralogist John L. Baum
- Junitoite: CaZn_{2}Si_{2}O_{7}·H_{2}O – Jun Ito (1926–1978), mineralogist and crystallographer, University of Chicago

== K ==
- Karenwebberite: Na(Fe^{2+},Mn^{2+})PO_{4} – American geologist Karen L. Webber
- Kassite: CaTi_{2}O_{4}(OH)_{2} – Russian geologist Nikolai Grigorievich Kassin (1885–1949)
- Kampfite: Ba_{12}(Si_{11}Al_{5})O_{31}(CO_{3})_{8}Cl_{5} – Anthony Robert Kampf (born 1948)
- Keilite: (Fe,Mg)S – American mineralogist Klaus Keil (1934–2022)
- Khinite: PbCu_{3}TeO_{6}(OH)_{2} – Burmese-American mineralogist Ba-Saw Khin (1931–)
- Khomyakovite: Na_{12}Ca_{6}Sr_{3}Fe_{3}WZr_{3}(Si_{25}O_{73})(O,OH,H_{2}O)_{3}(Cl,OH)_{2} – Russian mineralogist Alexander Khomyakov (1933–2012)
- Kieserite: MgSO_{4} · H_{2}O – Dietrich Georg von Kieser (1779–1862), former president, Jena Academy
  - And cobaltkieserite
- Kleberite: FeTi_{6}O_{13} · 4 H_{2}O – German professor Will Kleber (1906–1970)
- Kobellite: Pb_{22}Cu_{4}(Bi,Sb)_{30}S_{69} – German mineralogist Wolfgang Franz von Kobell (1803–1882)
- Kochsandorite: CaAl_{2}(CO_{3})_{2}(OH)_{4}H_{2}O – Hungarian mineralogist Sándor Koch (1896–1983)
- Kogarkoite: Na_{3}(SO_{4})F – Russian scientist Lia Nikolaevna Kogarko
- Kolbeckite: ScPO_{4} · 2 H_{2}O – German mineralogist Friedrich L. W. Kolbeck
- Kosnarite: KZr_{2}(PO_{4})_{3} – after Richard Andrew "Rich" Kosnar (1946–2007), American mineral collector
- Kostovite: AuCuTe_{4} – Bulgarian mineralogist Ivan Kostov (1913–2004)
- Krennerite: AuTe_{2} varying to (Au_{0.8},Ag_{0.2})Te_{2} – Hungarian mineralogist Joseph Krenner (1839–1920)
- Krotite: CaAl_{2}O_{4} – Russian-American cosmochemist Alexander N. Krot
- Kruťaite: CuSe_{2} Czech mineralogist Tomas Krut'a (1906–1998)
- Ktenasite: ZnCu_{4}(SO_{4})_{2}(OH)_{6}·_{6}H_{2}O – Greek geologist Konstantinos Ktenas (1884–1935)
- Kukharenkoite-(Ce): Ba_{3}CeF(CO_{3})_{3} – Russian mineralogist Alexander A. Kukharenko (1914–1993)
- Kurnakovite: MgB_{3}O_{3}(OH)_{5} · 5 H_{2}O – Russian mineralogist and chemist Nikolai Semenovich Kurnakov (1860–1941)
- Kunzite (variety of spodumene): – American mineralogist George Frederick Kunz (1856–1932)

== L ==
- Lacroixite: NaAl(PO_{4})F – French mineralogist Antoine François Alfred Lacroix (1863–1948)
- Langite: Cu_{4}(SO_{4})(OH)_{6}·2H_{2}O – Austrian chemist Viktor von Lang (1838–1921)
- Laueite (8.DC.30)
- Lavinskyite: K(Li,Cu,Mg,Na)_{2}Cu_{6}(Si_{4}O_{11})_{2}(OH)_{4} – photographer of minerals Robert Lavinsky (Commons:Robert Lavinsky)
- Lavoisierite: Mn^{2+}_{8}[Al_{10}(Mn^{3+}Mg)][Si_{11}P]O_{44}(OH)_{12} – French chemist Antoine-Laurent de Lavoisier (1743–1794)
- Leakeite root name, sodium amphibole subgroup – British geologist Bernard E. Leake (born 1932), University of Glasgow
  - Minerals: ferri-fluoro-leakeite, ferri-leakeite, fluoro-leakeite, potassic-ferri-leakeite, potassic-leakeite, potassic-mangani-leakeite
- Legrandite: Zn_{2}(AsO_{4})(OH)·(H_{2}O) – Belgian mining engineer Louis C.A. Legrand (1861–1920)
- Lemanskiite: NaCaCu_{5}(AsO_{4})_{4}Cl·5H_{2}O – Chester S. Lemanski, Jr. (b. 1947), American mineral collector
- Liebauite: Ca_{3}Cu_{5}Si_{9}O_{26} – German Friedrich Liebau (1926–2011), professor of mineralogy, Kiel University
- Linnaeite: Co^{+2}Co^{+3}_{2}S_{4} – Carl Linnaeus (1707–1778)
- Lipscombite: (Fe^{2+},Mn^{2+})(Fe^{3+})_{2}(PO_{4})_{2}(OH) – American chemist William Lipscomb (1919–2011)
  - And zinclipscombite
- Livingstonite: HgSb_{4}S_{8} – Scottish explorer in Africa David Livingstone (1813–1873)
- Lonsdaleite: C – British crystallographer Kathleen Lonsdale (1903–1971)
- Lorandite: TlAsS_{2} – Hungarian physicist Loránd Eötvös (1848–1919)
- Lotharmeyerite: CaZn_{2}(AsO_{4})_{2}·2H_{2}O – German chemist Julius Lothar Meyer (1830–1895)
  - And cobaltlotharmeyerite, ferrilotharmeyerite, manganlotharmeyerite, nickellotharmeyerite
- Lucabindiite: (K,NH_{4})As_{4}O_{6}(Cl,Br) – Luca Bindi, professor of mineralogy and former head of the Division of Mineralogy of the Natural History Museum of the University of Florence (b. 1971)
- Lukechangite-(Ce): Na_{3}Ce_{2}(CO_{3})_{4}F – American mineralogist Luke L. Y. Chang (1934–2009)

== M ==
- Macdonaldite: BaCa_{4}Si_{16}O_{36}(OH)_{2} · 10 H_{2}O – American volcanologist, Gordon Andrew Macdonald (1911–1978, redirect)
- Malhmoodite: FeZr(PO_{4})_{2} · 4H_{2}O – Bertha K. Malhmood, for many years Administrative Assistant of the Branch of Analytical Laboratories, U.S. Geological Survey
- Mandarinoite: Fe_{2}(SeO_{3})_{3} · 4H_{2}O – American-Canadian mineralogist Joseph (Joe) A. Mandarino (1929–2007)
  - And telluromandarinoite
- Maricite: NaFePO_{4} – Croatian mineralogist Luka Marić (1899–1979), University of Zagreb
- Marthozite: Cu(UO_{2})_{3}(SeO_{3})_{3}(OH)_{2}·7H_{2}O – Belgian mineralogist Aimé Marthoz (1894–1962)
- Machatschkiite (8.CJ.35)
- Mascagnite: (NH_{4})_{2}SO_{4} – Italian anatomist Paolo Mascagni (1752–1815)
- Mathesiusite: K_{5}(UO_{2})_{4}(SO_{4})_{4}(VO_{5}) · 4(H_{2}O) – German minister Johannes Mathesius (1504–1565)
- Mawbyite: Pb(Fe^{3+},Zn)_{2}(AsO_{4})_{2}(OH)_{2} – Australian metallurgist and mining executive Sir Maurice Alan Edgar Mawby (1904–1977)
- Mckelveyite-(Y): Ba_{3}NaCa_{0.75}U_{0.25}Y(CO_{3})_{6} · 3 H_{2}O – American geologist Vincent E. McKelvey (1916–1985)
- Meyerhofferite: CaB_{3}O_{3}(OH)_{5} · H_{2}O – German chemist, Wilhelm Meyerhoffer (1864–1906)
- Meyrowitzite: Ca(UO_{2})(CO_{3})_{2} · 5H_{2}O – after Robert Meyrowitz (1916–2013), an American analytical chemist
- Mendeleevite-(Ce): Cs_{6}(Ce_{22}Ca_{6})(Si_{70}O_{175})(OH,F)_{14}(H_{2}O)_{21} – Russian chemist Dmitri Ivanovich Mendeleev (1834–1907)
- Menzerite-(Y) (IMA2009-050)
- Millerite: NiS – British mineralogist William Hallowes Miller (1801–1880)
- Millosevichite: Al_{2}(SO_{4})_{3} – Italian mineralogist Federico Millosevich (1875–1942)
- Moëloite (2.HC.25)
- Mohsite (crichtonite var., 4.CC.40)
- Moissanite: SiC (naturally occurring) – discoverer Henri Moissan (1852–1907)
- Monticellite: Ca(Mg,Fe)SiO_{4} – Italian mineralogist Teodoro Monticelli (1759–1845)
- Morganite (variety of Beryl): – American financier J. P. Morgan (1837–1913)
- Mozartite: CaMn^{3+}SiO_{4}(OH) – Wolfgang Amadeus Mozart (1756–1791)
- Murdochite: PbCu_{6}O_{8−x}(Cl,Br)_{2x} – American mineralogist Joseph Murdoch (1890–1973)

== N ==
- Nataliakulikite: Ca_{4}Ti_{2}(Fe^{3+},Fe^{2+})(Si,Fe^{3+},Al)O_{11} – Russian mineralogist Natalia Artyemovna Kulik (born 1933)
- Nasonite: Pb_{6}Ca_{4}(Si_{2}O_{7})_{3}Cl_{2} – American mining engineer and author Frank Lewis Nason (1856–1928)
- Niedermayrite: Cu_{4}Cd(SO_{4})_{2}(OH)_{6}·4H_{2}O – Austrian geologist Gerhard Niedermayr (1941–)
- Nikischerite: Fe^{2+}_{6}Al_{3}(OH)_{18}[Na(H_{2}O)_{6}][SO_{4}]_{2}·6H_{2}O – American mineralogist Anthony J. Nikischer (born 1949)
- Niningerite: MgS – American meteoriticist Harvey Harlow Nininger (1887–1986)
- Norrishite: KLiMn^{3+}_{2}(Si_{4}O_{10})O_{2} – Australian geologist Keith Norrish (1924–2017), pioneer of wavelength-dispersive X-ray fluorescence analysis

== O ==
- Obertiite amphibole root name (9.DE.25)
- Okenite: CaSi_{2}O_{5}·2H_{2}O – German naturalist Lorenz Oken (1779–1851)

== P ==
- Pääkkönenite: Sb_{2}AsS_{2} – Finnish geologist Viekko Pääkkönen (1907–1980)
- Pabstite: BaSnSi_{3}O_{9} – Adolf Pabst (1899–1990), professor of mineralogy, University of California, Berkeley
- Partheite: Ca_{2}Al_{4}Si_{4}O_{15}(OH)_{2}·4H_{2}O – Swiss crystallographer Erwin Parthé (1928–2006)
- Paulingite series, zeolites – Linus Carl Pauling (1901–1994), professor of chemistry, California Institute of Technology
  - Paulingite-Ca and paulingite-K
- Paulscherrerite: UO_{2}(OH)_{2} – Swiss physicist Paul Scherrer (1890–1969)
- Pearceite: Cu(Ag,Cu)_{6}Ag_{9}As_{2}S_{11} – Cornish-American chemist and metallurgist Richard Pearce (1837–1927)
- Penikisite: BaMg_{2}Al_{2}(PO_{4})_{3}(OH)_{3} – Canadian explorer Gunar Penikis (1936–1979)
- Perhamite: Ca_{3}Al_{7}(SiO_{4})_{3}(PO_{4})_{4}(OH)_{3}·16.5(H_{2}O) – American geologist and pegmatite miner Frank C. Perham (born 1934)
- Perite: PbBiO_{2}Cl – Swedish geologist Per Adolf Geijer (1886–1976)
- Perovskite: CaTiO_{3} – Russian mineralogist L. A. Perovski (1792–1856)
- Perroudite (2.FC.20c)
- Petzite (1845): Ag_{3}AuTe_{2} – chemist W. Petz
- Pezzottaite: Cs(Be_{2}Li)Al_{2}Si_{6}O_{18} – Italian geologist and mineralogist Federico Pezzotta
- Phillipsite: (Ca,Na_{2},K_{2})_{3}Al_{6}Si_{10}O_{32}·12H_{2}O – English mineralogist and geologist William Phillips (1775–1828)
- Prehnite: Ca_{2}Al(AlSi_{3}O_{10})(OH)_{2} – Dutch governor Colonel Hendrik Von Prehn
- Priscillagrewite-(Y): (Ca_{2}Y)Zr_{2}Al_{3}O_{12} – American geologist Priscilla Croswell Perkins Grew (1940 – )
- Proustite: Ag_{3}AsS_{3} – French chemist Joseph Louis Proust (1754–1826)
- Putnisite: SrCa_{4}Cr_{8}^{3+}(CO_{3})_{8}(SO_{4})(OH)_{16}·25H_{2}O – mineralogists Andrew and Christine Putnis

== R ==
- Ramanite homologous series (6.EA.10)
- Rambergite: MnS – mineralogist Hans Ramberg (1917–1998)
- Rammelsbergite: NiAs_{2} – Karl Friedrich August Rammelsberg (1813–1899)
- Ramdohrite (2.JB.40a)
- Raspite: PbWO_{4} – prospector Charles Rasp (1846–1907)
- Raygrantite: Pb_{10}Zn(SO_{4})_{6}(SiO_{4})_{2}(OH)_{2} – Raymond W. Grant, professor of geology at Mesa Community College, Mesa, Arizona.
- Reidite: ZrSiO_{4} – Alan F. Reid (1931–2013), New Zealand chemist
- Renierite: (Cu,Zn)_{11}(Ge,As)_{2}Fe_{4}S_{16} – Armand Renier (1876–1951), director of the Belgian Geological Survey
- Riebeckite: Na_{2}(Fe,Mg)_{5}Si_{8}O_{22}(OH)_{2} – German explorer Emil Riebeck (1853–1885)
- Rittmannite: jahnsite-whiteite group – Swiss volcanologist Alfred Rittmann (1893–1980)
- Roeblingite (9.CB.05)
- Roselite: Ca_{2}(Co^{2+}, Mg)[AsO_{4}]_{2}·H_{2}O – German mineralogist Gustav Rose (1798–1873)
- Rosenbuschite (9.BE.22)
- Rossmanite: (LiAl_{2})Al_{6}Si_{6}O_{18}(BO_{3})_{3}(OH)_{4} – Caltech mineralogist George R. Rossman
- Rruffite (8.CG.10)
- Russellite: (BiO_{2})WO_{4} – British mineralogist Arthur Russell
- Rustumite: Ca_{10}(Si_{2}O_{7})_{2}(SiO_{4})(OH)_{2}Cl_{2} – American material scientist, Rustum Roy (1924–2010)

== S ==
- Saleeite: Mg(UO_{2})_{2}(PO_{4})_{2}·10H_{2}O – Belgian mineralogist Achille Salée (1883–1932)
- Samarskite: Y_{0.2}REE_{0.3}Fe^{3+}_{0.3}U_{0.2}Nb_{0.8}Ta_{0.2}O_{4} – Russian official Vasili Samarsky-Bykhovets (1803–1870)
- Sanbornite: BaSi_{2}O_{5} – American mineralogist Frank B. Sanborn (1862–1936)
- Satterlyite: (Fe^{++},Mg)_{2}(PO_{4})(OH) – Canadian geologist Jack Satterly (born 1906)
- Scheelite: CaWO_{4} – German-Swedish pharmaceutical chemist Carl Wilhelm Scheele (1742–1786)
- Shcherbinaite: V_{2}O_{5} – Soviet geologist Vladimir Shcherbina (1907–1978)
- Scheuchzerite (9.DM.35)
- Schoenfliesite (4.FC.10)
- Schoepite: (UO_{2})_{8}O(OH)_{12}·12H_{2}O – Alfred Schoep (1881–1966), professor of mineralogy at the University of Ghent
- Schreibersite: (Fe,Ni)_{3}P – Austrian naturalist Carl Franz Anton Ritter von Schreibers (1775–1852)
- Schreyerite: V_{2}Ti_{3}O_{9} – German mineralogist Werner Schreyer (1930–2006)
- Schröckingerite: NaCa_{3}(UO_{2}) – Julius Freiherr Schröckinger von Neudenberg (1814–1882)
- Scottyite: BaCu_{2}Si_{2}O_{7} – Michael Scott (born 1945), first CEO of Apple and significant sponsor of the Rruff project
- Seamanite: Mn_{3}[B(OH)_{4}](PO_{4})(OH)_{2} – Arthur Edmund Seaman (1858–1937)
- Segnitite: PbFe_{3}H(AsO_{4})_{2}(OH)_{6} – after Australian mineralogist, gemologist and petrologist Edgar Ralph Segnit (1923–1999)
- Sekaninaite: (Fe^{+2},Mg)_{2}Al_{4}Si_{5}O_{18} – Czech mineralogist Josef Sekanina (born 1901)
- Sellaite: MgF_{2} – Italian politician and mineralogist Quintino Sella (1827–1884)
- Senarmontite: Sb_{2}O_{3} – French mineralogist and physician Henri Hureau de Sénarmont (1808–1862)
- Sengierite: Cu_{2}(OH)_{2}[UO_{2}|VO_{4}]_{2}·6H_{2}O – Belgian UMHK director Edgar Sengier (1879–1963)
- Serpierite: Ca(Cu,Zn)_{4}(SO_{4})_{2}(OH)_{6}·3H_{2}O – Giovanni Battista Serpieri (1832–1897)
- Shulamitite: Ca_{3}TiFe^{3+}AlO_{8} – Israeli mineralogist and geologist Shulamit Gross (1923–2012)
- Sillimanite: Al_{2}SiO_{5} – American chemist Benjamin Silliman (1779–1864)
- Simpsonite: Al_{4}(Ta,Nb)_{3}O_{13}(OH) – Australian mineralogist Edward Sydney Simpson (1875–1939)
- Sklodowskite: Mg(UO_{2})_{2}(HSiO_{4})_{2}·5H_{2}O – Polish and naturalised-French physicist and chemist Marie Curie (1867–1934)
- Smithite: AgAsS_{2} – British mineralogist Herbert Smith (1872–1953)
- Smithsonite: ZnCO_{3} – British chemist and mineralogist, James Smithson (1754–1829)
- Sorbyite (2.LB.30)
- Sperrylite: PtAs_{2} – American chemist Francis Louis Sperry
- Steacyite: K_{0.3}(Ca,Na)_{2}ThSi_{8}O_{20} – Canadian mineralogist Harold Robert Steacy (born 1923)
- Stenonite: Sr_{2}Al(CO_{3})F_{5} – Danish physician Nicolaus Steno (Niels Steensen) (1638–1686)
- Stephanite: Ag_{5}SbS_{4} – Archduke Stephan of Austria (1817–1867)
- Stichtite: Mg_{6}Cr_{2}CO_{3}(OH)_{16}·4H_{2}O – American born Australian mine manager Robert Carl Sticht (1857–1922)
- Stilleite: ZnSe – German geologist Hans Stille (1876–1966)
- Stolzite: PbWO_{4} – French obstetrician Joseph Alexi Stolz (1803–1896)
- Strashimirite: Cu_{8}(AsO_{4})_{4}(OH)_{4}·5H_{2}O – Bulgarian petrographer and mineralogist Strashimir Dimitrov (1892–1960)
- Stromeyerite: AgCuS – German chemist Friedrich Stromeyer (1776–1835)
- Strunzite: Mn^{2+}Fe^{3+}_{2}(PO_{4})_{2}(OH)_{2}·6H_{2}O – German mineralogist Karl Hugo Strunz (1910–2006)
  - And ferristrunzite, ferrostrunzite
- Stumpflite: Pt(Sb,Bi) – Austrian professor of mineralogy Eugen Friedrich Stumpfl (1931–2004)
- Sugilite: KNa_{2}(Fe,Mn,Al)_{2}Li_{3}Si_{12}O_{30} – Japanese petrologist Ken-ichi Sugi (1901–1948)
- Svanbergite: SrAl_{3}(PO_{4})(SO_{4})(OH)_{6} – Swedish chemist Lars Fredrik Svanberg (1805–1878)
- Swedenborgite: NaBe_{4}Sb^{5+}O_{7} – Swedish scientist and theologian Emanuel Swedenborg (1688–1772)
- Sweetite: Zn(OH)_{2} – Curator of mineral department of the British Museum, Jessie Sweet (1901–1979)
- Sylvite: KCl – Dutch chemist Franciscus Sylvius (1614–1672)

== T ==
- Tarbuttite: Zn_{2}(PO_{4})(OH) Percy Coventry Tarbutt (died 1943), a Director of the Broken Hill Exploration Company
- Teallite: PbSnS_{2} – British geologist Jethro Justinian Harris Teall (1849–1924)
- Tennantite: Cu_{12}As_{4}S_{13} – English chemist Smithson Tennant (1761–1815)
- Tenorite: CuO – Italian botanist Michele Tenore (1780–1861)
- Theophrastite: Ni(OH)_{2} – Greek philosopher and writer Theophrastus (c. 371 – c. 287 BC)
- Thomasclarkite: Na_{0.8}Ce_{0.2}Y_{0.5}REE_{0.7}(HCO_{3})(OH)_{3}·4H_{2}O – Canadian geologist Thomas Clark (1893–1996)
- Thortveitite: (Sc,Y)_{2}Si_{2}O_{7} – Norwegian engineer Olaus Thortveit
- Tiemannite: HgSe – Johann Carl Wilhelm Tiemann (1848–1899)
- Torbernite: CuAl(UO_{2})_{2}(PO_{4})_{2}·8-12H_{2}O – Swedish chemist Torbern Bergman (1735–1784)
- Trevorite: NiFe_{2}O_{4} – Major Tudor Gruffydd Trevor, mining inspector for the Pretoria District, Transvaal, South Africa
- Tschernichite: CaAl_{2}Si_{6}O_{16}·8H_{2}O – Rudy W. Tschernich (born 1945), expert on zeolites
- Tschermakite: Ca_{2}(Mg_{3}AlFe^{3+})Si_{6}Al_{2}O_{22}(OH)_{2} – Austrian mineralogist Gustav Tschermak von Seysenegg (1836–1927)

== U ==
- Ulexite: NaCaB_{5}O_{9}·8H_{2}O – German chemist Georg Ludwig Ulex (1811–1883)
- Ullmannite: NiSbS – German chemist and mineralogist Johann Christoph Ullmann (1771–1821, redirect)
- Uytenbogaardtite: Ag_{3}AuS_{2} – Dutch mineralogist Willem Uytenbogaardt (1918–2012)
- Uvarovite: Ca_{3}Cr_{2}(SiO_{4})_{3} – Russian Count Sergei Semenovitch Uvarov (1765–1855)

== V ==
- Vaesite: NiS_{2} – Belgian mineralogist Johannes F. Vaes (1902–1978)
- Valentinite: Sb_{2}O_{3} – German alchemist Basilius Valentinus (might be Johann Thölde? 1565–1614)
- Vanthoffite: Na_{6}Mg(SO_{4})_{4} – Jacobus Henricus van't Hoff (1852–1911), professor of chemistry
- Vaterite: CaCO_{3} – German mineralogist Heinrich Vater (1859–1930)
- Vernadite (4.FE.40)
- Veszelyite: (Cu,Zn)_{2}Zn(PO_{4})(OH)_{3}·2H_{2}O – Ágost Veszely (1821–1879), Hungarian mining engineer
- Vincentite: (Pd,Pt)_{3}(As,Sb,Te) – Ewart Albert "David" Vincent (1919–2012), mineralogist at Durham College and Oxford University (UK) and chair of Geology at Manchester University (UK)
- Vivianite: Fe_{3}(PO_{4})_{2}·8H_{2}O and metavivianite – English mineralogist John Henry Vivian (1785–1855)

== W ==
- Wardite: NaAl_{3}(PO_{4})_{2}(OH)_{4}·2H_{2}O – American naturalist Henry Augustus Ward (1834–1906)
- Warikahnite: Zn_{3}(AsO_{4})_{2}·2H_{2}O – German mineral collector Walter Richard Kahn (born 1911)
- Weeksite: K_{2}(UO_{2})_{2}Si_{6}O_{15}·4H_{2}O – USGS mineralogist Alice Mary Dowse Weeks (1909–1988)
- Weloganite: Na_{2}(Sr,Ca)_{3}Zr(CO_{3})_{6}·3H_{2}O – Canadian geologist William Edmond Logan (1798–1875)
- Wendwilsonite: Ca_{2}Mg(AsO_{4})_{2}·2H_{2}O – Wendell E. Wilson (born 1946), Mineralogical Record editor and publisher
- Wernerite (intermediate member of the marialite-meionite series) – German geologist Abraham Gottlob Werner (1749–1817)
- Whewellite: CaC_{2}O_{4}·H_{2}O – English mineralogist William Whewell (1794–1866)
- Whiteite series: XM(1)M(2)Al_{2}(PO_{4})_{4}(OH)_{2}·8H_{2}O – John Sampson White, Jr. (born 1933), Mineralogical Record editor and publisher
- Whitlockite: Ca_{3}(PO_{4})_{2} – American mineralogist Herbert Percy Whitlock (1868–1948)
- Willemite: Zn_{2}SiO_{4} – William I of the Netherlands (1772–1843)
- Witherite: BaCO_{3} – English physician and naturalist William Withering (1741–1799)
- Wollastonite: CaSiO_{3} – English chemist and mineralogist William Hyde Wollaston (1766–1828)
- Woodhouseite: CaAl_{3}(SO_{4})(PO_{4})(OH)_{6} – American mineralogist Charles Douglas Woodhouse (1888–1975)
- Wolfeite: Fe^{2+}_{2}(PO_{4})(OH) – American mineralogist Caleb Wroe Wolfe (1908–1980)
  - Also wroewolfeite: Cu_{4}(SO_{4})(OH)_{6} · 2H_{2}O
- Wulfenite: PbMoO_{4} – Austrian mineralogist Franz Xaver von Wulfen (1728–1805)
- Wulffite: K_{3}NaCu_{4}O_{2}(SO_{4})_{4} – Russian crystallographer George (Yuri Viktorovich) Wulff (Russian: Георгий (Юрий) Викторович Вульф; 1863–1925)
- Wyartite: CaU^{5+}(UO_{2})_{2}(CO_{3})O_{4}(OH)·7H_{2}O – Jean Wyart (1902–1992), mineralogist at the Sorbonne

== Y ==
- Yangite: PbMnSi_{3}O_{8}·H_{2}O – Hexiong Yang, Mineralogy researcher at the Department of Geosciences, University of Arizona
- Yegorovite: Na_{4}[Si_{4}O_{8}(OH)_{4}]·_{7}H_{2}O – Yurii Kavdievich Yegorov-Tismenko (1938–2007), crystallographer at Moscow State University.

== Z ==
- Zaccagnaite: Zn_{4}Al_{2}CO_{3}(OH)_{12}·3H_{2}O – Italian geologist and mineral collector Domenico Zaccagna (1851–1940)
- Zaherite: Al_{12}(OH)_{26}(SO_{4})_{5}·20H_{2}O – Bangladeshi geologist M. A. Zaher (c. 1932–2017)
- Zajacite-(Ce): Na(REE_{x}Ca_{1−x})(REE_{y}Ca_{1−y})F_{6} – Explorer Ihor Stephan Zajac (born 1935)
- Zakharovite: Na_{4}Mn_{5}Si_{10}O_{20}(OH)_{6}·6H_{2}O – Russian Director of the Moscow Institute of Geological Exploration Evgeii Evgen'evich Zakharov (1902–1980)
- Zanazziite: Ca_{2}(MgFe)(MgFeMnAl)_{4}Be(OH)_{4}(PO_{4})_{6}·6H_{2}O – Italian Professor Pier Francesco Zanazzi (born 30 April 1939)
- Zaratite: Ni_{3}CO_{3}(OH)_{4}·4(H_{2}O) – Spanish diplomat and dramatist Antonio Gil y Zárate (1793–1861)
- Zavaritskite: (BiO)F – Soviet geologist and petrographer Alexander Nikolaevich Zavaritsky (1884–1952)
- Zektzerite: LiNa(Zr,Ti,Hf)Si_{6}O_{15} – American mathematician and mineral collector Jack Zektzer (born 1936)
- Zeunerite: Cu(UO_{2})_{2}(AsO_{4})_{2}·(10–16)H_{2}O – German physicist, engineer and epistemologist Gustav Anton Zeuner (1828–1907)
  - Also metazeunerite: Cu(UO_{2})_{2}(AsO_{4})_{2} · 8H_{2}O
- Zhanghengite: CuZn – ancient Chinese astronomer Zhang Heng (78–139)
- Zhemchuzhnikovite: NaMgAl(C_{2}O_{4})_{3}·8H_{2}O – Russian clay mineralogist Yury Zhemchuzhnikov (1885–1957)
- Ziesite: βCu_{2}V_{2}O_{7} – mineralogist Emanuel George Zies
- Zigrasite: MgZr(PO_{4})_{2}(H_{2}O)_{4} – American mineral collector James Zigras (born 1981)
- Zinkenite: Pb_{9}Sb_{22}S_{42} – German mineralogist and mining geologist, Johann Karl Ludwig Zinken (1790–1862)
- Zippeite: (UO_{2})_{6}(SO_{4})_{3}(OH)_{10}·4H_{2}O – Austrian mineralogist Franz Xaver Maximilian Zippe
- Zirkelite: (Ca,Th,Ce)Zr(Ti,Nb)_{2}O_{7} – German petrographer Ferdinand Zirkel (1838–1912)
- Zoisite: Ca_{2}(Al.OH)Al_{2}(SiO_{4})_{3} – Carniolan scientist Sigmund Zois (1747–1819)
- Zussmanite: K(Fe^{2+},Mg,Mn)_{13}[AlSi_{17}O_{42}](OH)_{14} – British geologist Jack Zussman (born 1924)
- Zykaite: Fe^{3+}_{4}(AsO_{4})_{3}(SO_{4})(OH)·15H_{2}O – Czech geochemist Vacklav Zyka

== See also ==
- Mineralogy
- Mineraloid
- List of minerals recognized by the International Mineralogical Association
- List of minerals
- Eponym
- Lists of etymologies
- List of eponyms
