= Satterlyite =

Hydroxyl bearing iron phosphate mineral

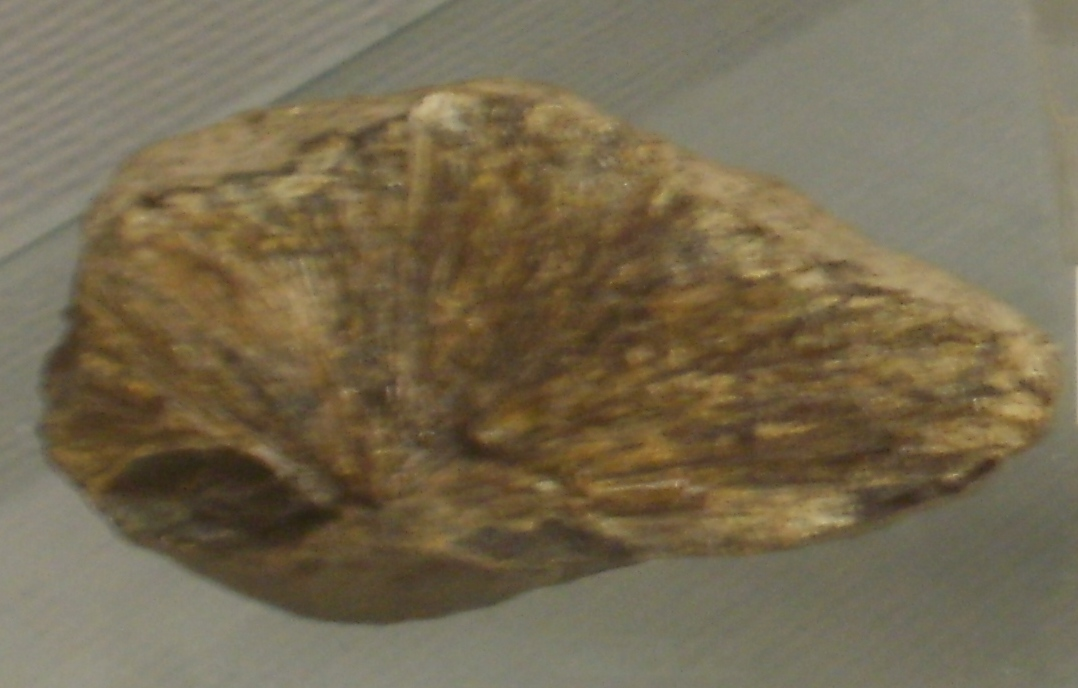
- Satterlyite from the Rapid Creek area of northern Yukon, Canada

General
- Category: Phosphate minerals
- Formula: (Fe^{2+},Mg,Fe^{3+})_{2}(PO_{4})(OH)
- IMA symbol: Sly
- Strunz classification: 8.BB.20
- Crystal system: Trigonal
- Crystal class: Ditrigonal pyramidal (3m); H-M symbol: (3m)
- Space group: P3̅1m (no. 162), P31m (no. 157), or P312 (no. 149)
- Unit cell: a = 11.35, c = 5.04 [Å]; Z = 6

Identification
- Color: Light brown to light yellow
- Crystal habit: Aggregate, nodular and radial
- Cleavage: None
- Mohs scale hardness: 4.5–5
- Luster: Vitreous
- Streak: Pale yellow
- Diaphaneity: Transparent
- Specific gravity: 3.68
- Optical properties: Uniaxial (−)
- Refractive index: n_{ω} = 1.721 n_{ε} = 1.719
- Birefringence: δ = 0.002

Satterlyite is a hydroxyl bearing iron phosphate mineral. The mineral can be found in phosphatic shales and was first discovered in the Big Fish River area in Yukon Territory, Canada.

Satterlyite is part of the phosphate mineral group. Satterlyite is a transparent, light brown to light yellow mineral with a density of 3.68 g/cm^{3}. The structure of satterlyite is made up of two pairs of face shared, distorted (Fe,Mg)O_{6} octahedra, linked together by sharing edges to form double chains along the [001] plain.

The first satterlyite mineral was discovered in the Big Fish River area in Yukon Territory, westernmost of Canada; by a geologist at Ontario Department of Mines in Canada, Jack Satterly, and the mineral was also named after him (Kolitsch, 2002).

== Composition ==
Satterlyite has a formula of (Fe^{2+},Mg,Fe^{3+})_{2}(PO_{4})(OH). Studies using the optical absorption spectra show that satterlyite has similar features to different iron bearing minerals with Fe(III) and Fe(II) impurities. Electron paramagnetic resonance studies were also made on the mineral first by turning the satterlyite mineral fine powder then putting it into an electron paramagnetic resonance quartz tube for measurements. The results showed a strong line on g = 2.0 and another line on g = 8.0, thus also showing a presence of ferrous and ferric ions in satterlyite.

== Structure ==
Satterlyite is hydroxyl bearing iron phosphate with a space group P31m. The structure of satterlyite is made up of two pairs of face shared, distorted (Fe,Mg)O_{6} octahedra, the two faces are linked together by sharing edges to form double chains along the [001] plain. The double chains share ligands with six other double chains to make a 3D network holding three PO_{4} tetrahedra, linked by the corners to the (Fe,Mg)O_{6} octahedra (Kolitsch, 2002). The two (Fe,Mg)O_{6} oOctahedra have different occupancies; the Fe to Mg ratio of the M sites are 0.838(2):0.162(2) for the M(1) site and 0.706(2):0.294(2) for the M(2) site (Kolitsch, 2002). The structure contains three H atoms; two are share ligands with two (Fe,Mg)O_{6} octahedra and the third strongly disordered H atom is bonded to O of the PO_{4} tetrahedron (Kolitsch, 2002).

Holtedahlite, a mineral that was found in Tingelstadtjern quarry in Norway, with the formula (Mg_{12}PO_{4})_{5}(PO_{3}OH,CO_{3})(OH,O)_{6} is isostructural with satterlyite (Raade, 1979). Infrared absorption powder spectra show that satterlyite is different from natural haltedahlite in that there is no carbonate for phosphate substitution (Kolitsch, 2002). Satterlyite is also structurally related to phosphoellenbergerite, a mineral that was discovered in Modum, Norway; near San Giocomo Vallone Di Gilba, in Western Alps of Italy (Palache, 1951); the minerals formula is Mg_{14}(PO_{4})_{5}(PO_{3}OH)_{2}(OH)_{6} (Kolitsch, 2002).

Electron paramagnetic resonance and optical absorption studies have investigated the iron phosphate mineral satterlyite and gormanite. Results of the optical studies show that both minerals have ferrous and ferric ions (Chandrasekhar, 2003). These studies also show that the site symmetry of Fe(III) in satterlyite is tetragonally distorted. However, the Fe(II) ions is tetragonally distorted octahedral (Chandrasekhar, 2003). The complex structure of satterlyite is made up of two pairs of face shared, distorted (Fe,Mg)O_{6} octahedra, linked together by sharing edges to form double chains along [001].

== Physical properties ==
Satterlyite has a light brown to light yellow color with a light yellow streak and a hardness of 4.5 to 5. It has no trigonal (ditrigonal pyramidal) crystal symmetry with a space group P3*1m and no cleavage (Mandarino, 1978). The parameters of the mineral are a = 11.35 Å and c = 5.04 Å and the ratio of a to c is 1:0.444 and a cell volume 562.28 Å^{3} (Mindat, 2011). The mineral is found as one of three habits; aggregated (when the mineral is made up of many individual crystals or clusters), nodular (grows as a circle around the center) or radial (the crystal radiates outwards from the center of a common point on the mineral; Mineralogy Database, 2011).

== Geologic occurrence ==
Jack Satterly, a geologist at Ontario Department of Mines in Canada, discovered satterlyite in nodules in shale in the Big Fish River (Mandarino, 1978). These nodules were about 10 cm in diameter, some would consist of satterlyite only and others would show satterlyite with quartz, pyrite, wolfeite or maricite. The Commission on New Minerals and Mineral Names approved the name of the mineral (Mandarino, 1978). The type specimen is now preserved at the Royal Ontario Museum (Mandarino, 1978).
