= Abswurmbachite =

Copper manganese silicate mineral

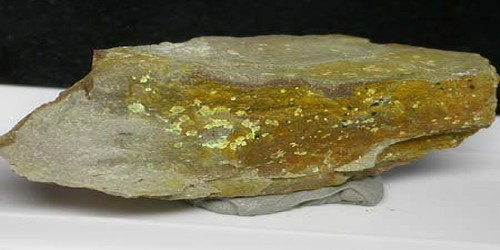

General
- Category: Nesosilicate
- Formula: (Cu,Mn^{2+})Mn^{3+}_{6}O_{8}SiO_{4}
- IMA symbol: Abs
- Strunz classification: 9.AG.05
- Dana classification: 7.5.1.4
- Crystal system: Tetragonal
- Crystal class: 4/mmm – Ditetragonal dipyramidal
- Unit cell: 1640.82 Å^{3}

Identification
- Color: Black
- Cleavage: None observed
- Tenacity: Brittle
- Mohs scale hardness: 6.5
- Luster: Metallic
- Streak: Brownish black
- Specific gravity: 4.96 g/cm^{3}
- Density: 4.96 g/cm^{3}
- Pleochroism: Non-pleochroic
- Common impurities: Iron

Abswurmbachite is a copper manganese silicate mineral ((Cu,Mn^{2+})Mn^{3+}_{6}O_{8}SiO_{4}). It was first described in 1991 and named after Irmgard Abs-Wurmbach (born 1938), a German mineralogist. It crystallizes in the tetragonal system. Its Mohs scale rating is 6.5 and its specific gravity is 4.96. It has a metallic luster and its color is jet black, with light brown streaks.

== See also ==
- List of minerals
- List of minerals named after people
