= Daliranite =

Sulfosalt found in northwestern Iran

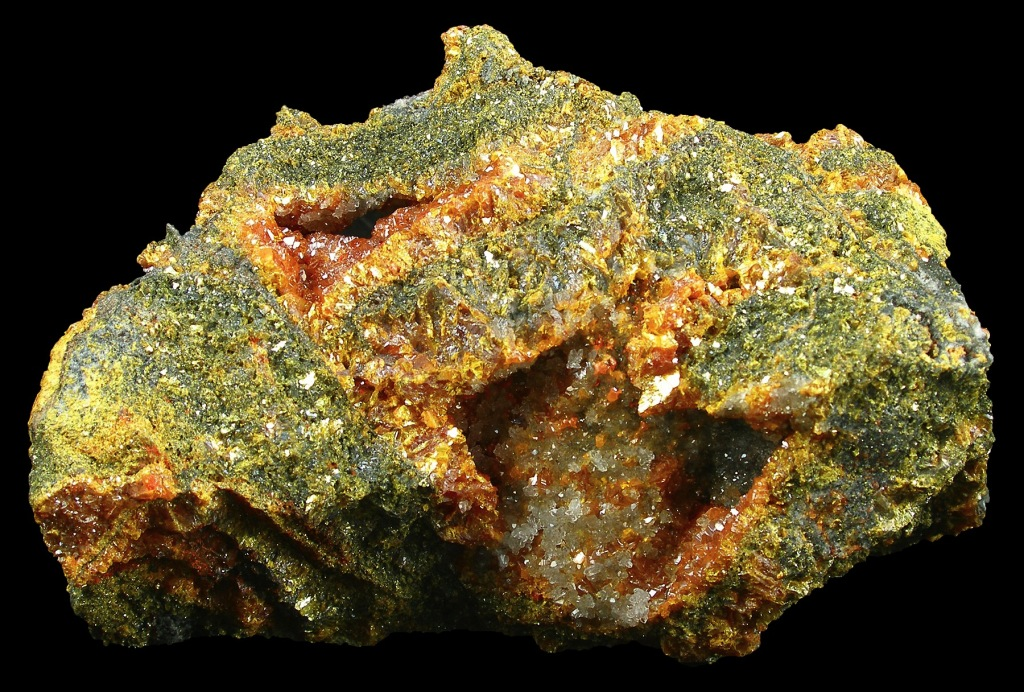

General
- Category: Sulfosalt
- Formula: PbHgAs_{2}S_{5}
- IMA symbol: Dal
- Crystal system: Orthorhombic
- Crystal class: Pnma
- Unit cell: a= 21 Å, b= 4.3 Å, c= 9.5 Å

Identification
- Color: Orange-red
- Crystal habit: Acicular and fibrous
- Mohs scale hardness: <2
- Luster: Adamantine
- Streak: Pale orange-red
- Density: 5.93 (calculated)
- Birefringence: Very weak to absent
- Pleochroism: Absent
- Ultraviolet fluorescence: Not fluorescent

Daliranite is a sulfosalt found in northwestern Iran with a general chemical formula of PbHgAs_{2}S_{5}. The mineral presents a vibrant orange-red color and fibrous habit which makes it resemble the oxide ludlockite being confused by its similarities in early studies. Named after Dr. Farahnaz Daliran, who has important contributions to research on ore deposits in Iran, this mineral was accepted by the International Mineralogical Association (IMA) in 2007.

== Occurrence ==
Daliranite is found in the Zarashouran deposit which is an Au-As deposit located near the town of Takab in the province of West Azerbaijan in Iran. The mineral is not found alone as it is found in samples composed mostly of the sulfide mineral orpiment. This sulfosalt grows within cavities of orpiment and is always found covering other minerals therefore it is believed to crystallize last. The temperature of formation ranges between 157 and 193 °C forming at the same time as quartz II.

== Physical properties ==
Daliranite crystals show as small sets with acicular and fibrous habits. The filaments can have a length of ≤200 μm which occurs parallel to [010] with a width of <3 μm. The crystals present an orange-red color and a paler colored streak. The surface shows an adamantine luster with a hardness of less than 2 on the Mohs scale of hardness. The mineral is transparent and does not present fluorescence. Because of the size of the crystals and their proximity to other minerals, the density had to be calculated from the chemical formula arriving at a density of 5.93 g/cm^{3}.

== Optical properties ==
Because of Daliranite's fibrous habit, making thin sections is complicated for proper measurements. To have a successful thin section, it is necessary to find a dense area of fibers in order to have fewer spaces filled with resin. One successful sample determined that the mineral is grey when seen in reflected light microscopy. It is possible to distinguish from orpiment by its higher reflectance. No pleochroism and very weak to absent bireflectance were observed.

== Chemical composition ==
Daliranite is classified as a persulfide because of its excess sulfur which is seen in two other sulfosalts livingstonite and molite. This excess in sulfur indicates S-S bonding in the mineral. Electron microprobe analyses were done in eight spots giving the empirical formula Pb_{0.95}T_{0.01}Hg_{1.04}As_{2.10}S_{5.91} and the simplified formula PbHgAs_{2}S_{6}. However, newer analyses using energy-dispersive X-ray spectroscopy indicated that the formula has one sulfur atom fewer than what was reported previously, updating the formula to PbHgAs_{2}S_{5}.

Element	Atomic Proportions	Wt%
Pb	1	27.63
Hg	1	26.75
As	2	19.98
S	6	25.65
Total		100

== Crystal structure ==
Daliranite fibers were studied using selected area electron diffraction (SAED) originally indicating that the mineral has a primitive monoclinic unit cell and approximate values for the unit cell dimensions. Later work showed that it has an incommensurately modulated space group Pnma on average, with a= 21 Å, b= 4.3 Å, c= 9.5 Å.

== X-ray powder diffraction data ==
d-spacing Å	Intensity	hkl
7.722	100	7̅03
8.67	80	200
4.65	50	4̅01
3.40	50	113
2.894	50	6̅00
2.187	50	3̅19
3.87	40	2̅11
3.15	40	6̅02

== See also ==
List of Minerals
