= Macdonaldite =

Phyllosilicate mineral

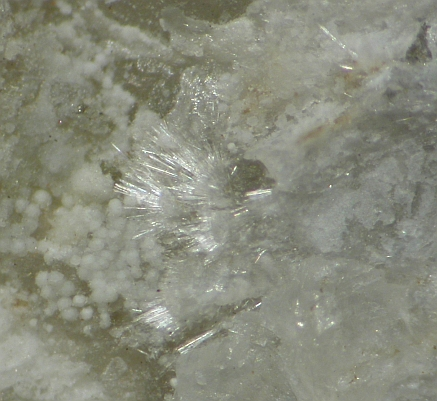
- White sprays of macdonaldite and blue botryoidal crust of mcguinnessite

General
- Category: Phyllosilicate minerals
- Formula: BaCa_{4}Si_{16}O_{36}(OH)_{2}·10H_{2}O
- IMA symbol: Mcd
- Strunz classification: 9.EB.05
- Crystal system: Orthorhombic
- Crystal class: Dipyramidal (mmm); H-M symbol: (2/m 2/m 2/m)
- Space group: Cmcm
- Unit cell: a = 14.06 Å, b = 23.52 Å, c = 13.08 Å; Z = 4

Identification
- Color: Colorless, white
- Crystal habit: Acicular also fibrous, in radiating aggregates; granular
- Cleavage: {010} perfect, {001} good, {100} indistinct
- Mohs scale hardness: 3.5–4.0
- Luster: Vitreous – silky
- Streak: White
- Diaphaneity: Transparent to translucent
- Specific gravity: 2.27
- Optical properties: Biaxial (+/−), surface relief – low,
- Refractive index: n_{α} = 1.518 n_{β} = 1.524 n_{γ} = 1.530
- Birefringence: 0.012
- 2V angle: Measured: 90°
- Dispersion: Weak

Macdonaldite is a rare barium silicate mineral with a chemical formula of BaCa_{4}Si_{16}O_{36}(OH)_{2}·10H_{2}O. Macdonaldite was first described in 1965 and named for Gordon A. Macdonald (1911–1978) an American volcanologist at the University of Hawaii.

Macdonaldite crystallises in the orthorhombic system. Macdonaldite is anisotropic with low relief.

Macdonaldite appears as veins and fracture coatings in a sanbornite and quartz bearing metamorphic rock. Macdonaldite was first described in 1965 for an occurrence near the Big Creek-Rush Creek area in Fresno County, California. It has also been reported from Mariposa and Tulare counties in California; and from a quarry in San Venanzo, Umbria, Italy.
