= Zakharovite =

Phyllosilicate mineral

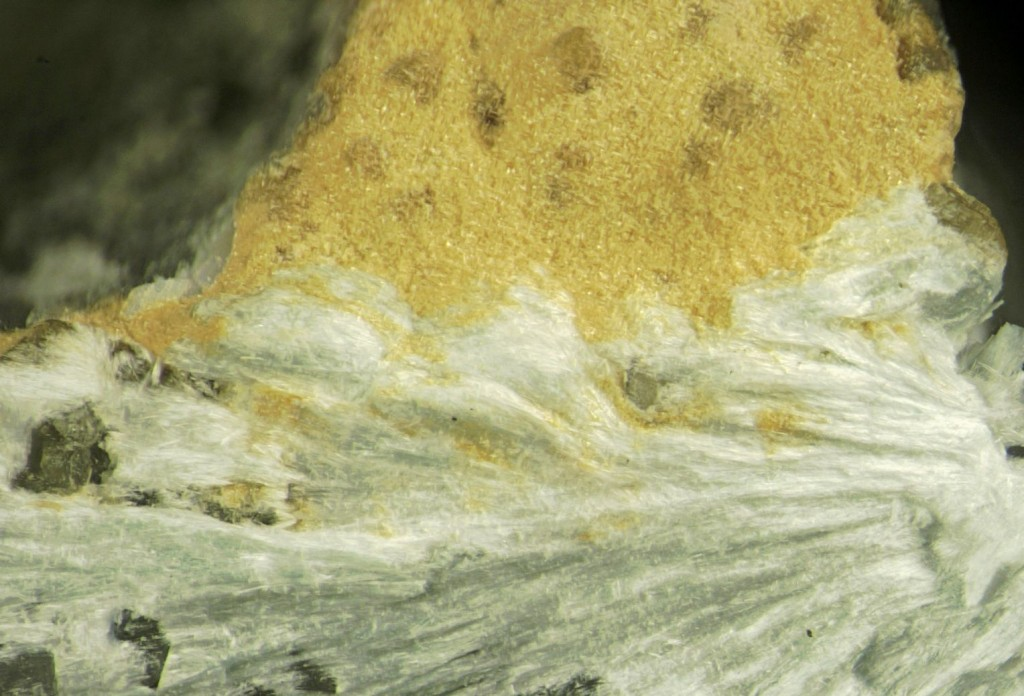

General
- Category: Phyllosilicate minerals
- Formula: Na_{4}Mn_{5}Si_{10}O_{24}(OH)_{6}·6H_{2}O
- IMA symbol: Zak
- Crystal system: Trigonal

Identification
- Color: Yellow
- Cleavage: Perfect {0001}
- Fracture: Conchoidal
- Mohs scale hardness: 2
- Luster: Waxy, pearly, dull

Zakharovite is a mineral, a silicate of sodium and manganese; formula Na_{4}Mn_{5}Si_{10}O_{24}(OH)_{6}·6H_{2}O. It has a yellow colour with a pearly lustre. Discovered in 1982 in the Kola Peninsula of Northern Russia, it is named after Evgeny Evgenevich Zakharov (1902–1980), the director of the Moscow Institute of Geological Exploration.

== See also ==
- List of minerals
- List of minerals named after people
