= Thortveitite =

Sorosilicate mineral

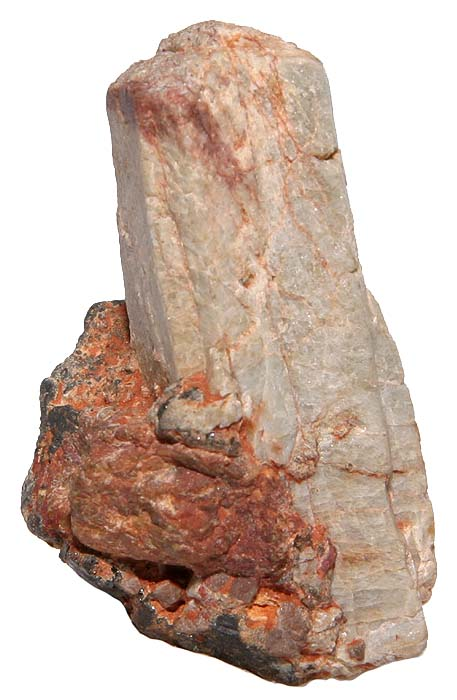
- Thortveitite

General
- Category: Minerals
- Formula: (Sc,Y)_{2}Si_{2}O_{7}
- IMA symbol: Tvt
- Strunz classification: 9.BC.05
- Crystal system: Monoclinic
- Crystal class: Prismatic (2/m) (same H-M symbol)
- Space group: C2/m

Identification
- Mohs scale hardness: 5–6
- Luster: vitreous
- Streak: gray
- Specific gravity: 3.3–3.8

Thortveitite is a rare mineral consisting of scandium yttrium silicate (Sc,Y)_{2}Si_{2}O_{7}. It is the most widespread scandium mineral, but natural thortveitite is not widely exploited as a source of scandium metal. Most scandium is derived from mine tailings, which can include thortveitite. Thortveitite mining in the United States ceased in 1969.

Occurrence is in granitic pegmatites. It was named after Olaus Thortveit, a Norwegian engineer. It is grayish-green, black or gray in color.

A transparent gem quality example was found in 2004, and reported in The Journal of Gemmology.

== See also ==
- List of minerals
- List of minerals named after people
