= Danielsite =

Sulfide mineral

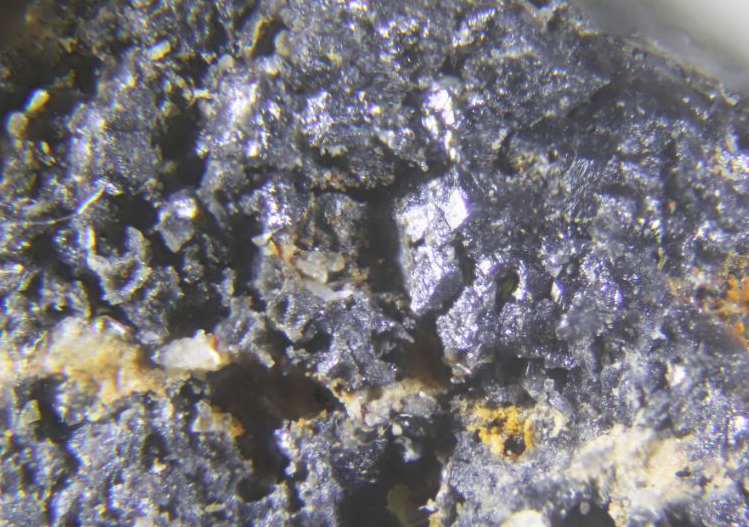

General
- Category: Sulfide and Sulfosalt
- Formula: (Cu,Ag)_{14}HgS_{8}
- IMA symbol: Dns
- Strunz classification: 2/B.09-10
- Dana classification: 2.16.7.2
- Crystal system: Orthorhombic
- Space group: n.d.
- Unit cell: a = 9.644[Å] b = 9.180[Å] c = 18.156[Å] Z = 4

Identification
- Color: Gray
- Crystal habit: Microscopic Crystals 20 micron masses in anglesite
- Tenacity: Brittle
- Mohs scale hardness: 1.5-2.5
- Luster: Metallic
- Diaphaneity: opaque
- Specific gravity: 6.541 g/cm^{3} (calculated)
- Density: 6.541 g/cm^{3} (calculated)
- Optical properties: Anisotropic
- Birefringence: Weak

Danielsite is a sulfide and sulfosalt that was first discovered in a pocket of supergene minerals in the north region of Western Australia. The location found was about 1 kilometre (0.62 mi) west of the locality known as Coppin Pool. The mineral danielsite was named after John L. Daniels who collected the sample in which the new mineral was found. The chemical formula of danielsite is (Cu,Ag)_{14}HgS_{8}. Danielsite is very fine grained and hard to observe in hand samples. It generally has a gray color with very brittle and soft physical characteristics.

== Occurrence ==
Danielsite occurs in the mineral anglesite as ragged polycrystalline masses typically intergrown with covellite, stromeyerite, and chalcocite. The size of these masses is typically 20 micrometres (0.00079 in) across. Due to its occurrence with stromeyerite it is thought to possibly be a polymorphic replacement of galena. Danielsite was found in a gossaniferous pod in a white quartz vein. It has been found near Coppin Pool, Ashburton Shire, Western Australia, Australia, Austria, and Belgium.

== Physical properties ==
Danielsite is a metallic-gray mineral that looks a lot like stromeyerite, the main difference between the two is that stormeyerites colors are yellow to brown whereas danielsite is gray. Danielsite is very soft and brittle with only a 1.5-2.5 on the mohs hardness scale (VHN_{10} hardness of 38). There is no discernible type of cleavage, but due to the small size of the crystallites the possibility of cleavage can't be 100% excluded. It is a rather dense mineral weighing in at 6.541 g/cm^{3}.

== Chemical composition ==
Element	wt%	Range
Cu	33.9	32.5-34.6
Ag	36.5	35.8-37.1
Hg	12.3	12.2-12.4
S	16.1	15.8-16.3

The data for this chart was gathered using a polished section by electron microprobe and using a crystal spectrometer with the following standards: galena (S), cinnabar (Hg), and metals (Ag and Cu). The results were calculated on the basis of 23 atoms due to its chemical formula being very similar to balkanite.

== X-Ray crystallography ==
The sample found was ground up and an X-ray powder diffraction was done to the powder. The pattern had a few places that appeared to be anglesite but overall the pattern didn't match up with any other mineral known. Most of the values could be measured on a triclinic unit cell but the d values of the actual data and calculated data varied by a lot. Most sulfides do not belong to the triclinic system as well, so it was thought that this was the wrong choice for danielsite. More research was done on this mineral by Nickel and Kato and they both came to the conclusion that danielsite has an orthorhombic unit cell. When they tried calculating the d values based on the orthorhombic system the values came back very similar. Even though danielsite and balkanite have very similar chemical formulas their unit cells are vastly different. From the reported occurrences of the two minerals it is apparent that balkanite is the high temperature form and danielsite is the low-temperature form.

I _{est}	D _{obs}	D _{calc}	hkl
2	4.44	4.450	021
1	4.11	4.107	104
		4.096	022
2	3.648	3.657	023
		3.631	005
0.5	3.493	3.488	213
0.5	3.401	3.398	105
1	3.314	3.325	220
		3.305	204
.5	3.198	3.187	115
2B	3.018	3.026	006
		3.017	031
.5	2.885	2.887	106
		2.880	131
3	2.831	2.839	303
10	2.622	2.627	133
		2.623	304
1	2.564	2.563	206
		2.558	231
1	2.475	2.469	216
5	2.392	2.407	305
		2.390	401
0.5	2.222	2.225	042
		2.217	217
1	2.080	2.081	333
		2.078	422
1	2.034	2.034	028
1	1.991	1.992	334
		1.991	128
		1.986	326
6	1.959	1.960	243
6	1.875	1.877	511
		1.874	228
2	1.692	1.692	147
1	1.642	1.638	055
.5	1.588	1.590	239
		1.589	346
		1.588	351
0.5	1.512	1.513	0.0.12
		1.512	621
		1.511	455
.5	1.425	1.427	058
		1.426	2.1.12
		1.424	0.4.10
1B	1.279	1.280	1.5.10
		1.279	462
1	1.259	1.258	168
		1.257	609

== See also ==
- List of Minerals
- Classification of minerals
