= Paulscherrerite =

Mineral

General
- Category: Oxide minerals, uranyl hydroxides
- Formula: UO_{2}(OH)_{2}
- IMA symbol: Psc
- Strunz classification: 4.GA.05
- Crystal system: Monoclinic; Unknown space group

Identification
- Color: Canary yellow
- Crystal habit: Microcrystalline powder
- Cleavage: Undetermined
- Fracture: Undetermined
- Mohs scale hardness: Undetermined
- Streak: Yellow
- Specific gravity: 6.66 g/cm^{3}
- Ultraviolet fluorescence: none
- Other characteristics: Radioactive

Paulscherrerite, UO_{2}(OH)_{2}, is a newly named mineral of the schoepite subgroup of hexavalent uranium hydrate/hydroxides. It is monoclinic, but no space group has been determined because no single-crystal study has been done. Paulscherrerite occurs as a canary yellow microcrystalline powdery product with a length of ~500 nm. It forms by the weathering and ultimate pseudomorphism of uranium-lead bearing minerals such as metaschoepite. The type locality for paulscherrerite is the Number 2 Workings, Radium Ridge near Mount Painter, North Flinders Ranges, South Australia, an area where radiogenic heat has driven hydrothermal activity for millions of years. It is named for Swiss physicist Paul Scherrer, co-inventor of the Debye-Scherrer X-ray powder diffraction camera. Study of paulscherrerite and related minerals is important for understanding the mobility of uranium around mining sites, as well as designing successful strategies for the storage of nuclear weapons and the containment of nuclear waste.

== Introduction ==
The schoepite subgroup of the fourmarierite group: schoepite, metaschoepite, paraschoepite, and "dehydrated schoepite", are closely related hexavalent uranium (uranyl) oxide hydrates/hydroxides. Schoepite was first described by T. L. Walker in 1923 and the determination of the relationship between the various subgroups has since been ongoing. Detailed X-ray powder diffraction and single crystal studies have led to a better understanding of the natural dehydration process of schoepite that result in the rest of the subgroup. "Dehydrated schoepite" has now been formally described as a mineral species by a team of geologists led by Joël Brugger of the University of Adelaide, Australia and given the name paulscherrerite, with the formula UO_{3}·1.02H_{2}O.

== Composition ==
The empirical formula for paulscherrerite is UO_{3}·1.02H_{2}O. The formulas for the rest of the schoepite group are: schoepite (UO_{2})_{8}O_{2}(OH)_{12} · 12H_{2}O and metaschoepite UO_{3}·1-2H_{2}O. Electron microprobe 20 point analyses showed that it is an almost pure uranyl oxide-hydroxide/hydrate, with less than ~1 wt% of minor elements such as Al, Ba, and Pb. The simplified structural formula is UO_{2}(OH)_{2}, which requires the presence of water: UO_{3} 93.96, H_{2}O 6.04, Total 100.00 wt%. Table 1 shows an analysis of the chemical composition. Because paulscherrerite always exists in powder form, mixed with substantial amounts of metaschoepite, thermogravimetric analysis (TGA) is the best method of water measurement.

== Structure ==
Paulscherrerite is monoclinic (pseudo-orthrombic), with a = 4.288(2), b = 10.270(6), c = 6.885(5)Å, β = 90.39(4) = 90.39(4)o, V = 303.2(2)Å3, and Z = 4. No space group determination has been made, as no single-crystal study has been done. Given the very small crystallites (less than a few tens of nanometers), it is very difficult to distinguish an orthorhombic cell from a monoclinic cell with β close to 90° (Bevan et al. 2002). Possible space groups that explain all 46 reflections found include: P2, P2_{1}, P2/m, and P2_{1}/m. The structures of the closely related schoepite, metaschoepite consist of layers formed by edge-sharing UO_{7} pentagonal bi-pyramids interspersed with hydrogen bounded water molecules. The structure of orthorhombic α-UO_{2}(OH)_{2} (synthesized "dehydrated schoepite"), however, consists of layers formed by edge sharing UO_{8} hexagonal bipyramids. The uranyl sheets in schoepite/metaschoepite and α-UO_{2}(OH)_{2} are topologically related via the substitution 2(OH) = O_{2} + vacancy.

== Physical properties ==
Paulscherrerite occurs as a microcrystalline powdery product with a maximum length of ~500 nm. It forms by the weathering and ultimate pseudomorphism of uranium-lead bearing minerals such as metaschoepite. Paulscherrerite is canary yellow, with a yellow streak, and no fluorescence. The Mohs hardness cannot be measured due to the powdery nature of the mineral, and no cleavage or fracture is observable. The calculated density is 6.66 g/cm3 for the ideal formula UO_{2}(OH)_{2}. No optical properties have been recorded. See Table 1 for a list of the physical properties of paulscherrerite.

== Geologic occurrence ==
The type locality for paulscherrerite is the Number 2 Workings, Radium Ridge near Mount Painter, North Flinders Ranges, South Australia, which contains large volumes of granites and gneisses highly enriched in uranium and thorium. The Number 2 Workings expose a lens of massive coarse-grained hematite with a fine-grained monazite-(Ce), xenotime-(Y), and Ca-Fe-phosphate matrix and abundant iron-rich euxenite. The radiogenic heat produced by uranium-thorium-potassium-rich rocks drove hydrothermal activity over hundreds of millions of years. These conditions of high-temperature hydrothermal mineralization are ideal for the formation and deposition of abundant deposits of paulscherrerite, a dehydration product of metaschoepite. Secondary uranium minerals occur in cavities of the predominant hematite/quartz including weeksite, beta-uranophane, metatorbernite, soddyite, kasolite, billietite, and barite. Figure 3. shows the geomorphology of the Mt. Gee – Mt. Painter epithermal system. “Dehydrated-schoepite” has also been identified as an early product of uraninite weathering in the Ruggles and Palermo granitic pegmatites, New Hampshire, U.S.

== Special characteristics ==
Schoepite, metaschoepite, and paulscherrerite result from the weathering of uranium minerals such as uraninite and the corrosion of anthropogenic uranium bearing solids. The oxy-hydroxides of the shoepite subgroup act as precursors in the formation of more complex and stable assemblages (Brugger et al. 2003). Study of these minerals is important for understanding the mobility of uranium around mining sites, as well as designing successful strategies for the storage of nuclear weapons and the containment of nuclear waste.

== Biographic sketch ==
Paulscherrerite is named in recognition of the vital contributions to mineralogy and nuclear physics of Swiss physicist Paul Scherrer (1890–1969). While studying at the University of Göttingen in 1916, he and Peter Debye, Scherrer's mentor and eventual Nobel Prize winner, developed the powder diffraction theory (the Scherrer equation) and designed the Debye-Scherrer X-ray powder diffraction camera. By 1920, Scherrer had become interested in nuclear physics, was appointed to a professorship at the ETH Zürich, and was involved in the early development of solid-state physics, nuclear physics, and electronics. He was named President of the Swiss Study Commission for Atomic Energy in 1946 and took part in establishing CERN near Geneva in 1954 (Hephaestus, 2011). Since 1988, the Paul Scherrer Institute has been the largest Swiss national research institute, active in elementary particle physics, material sciences, and nuclear and non-nuclear energy research. The name for the mineral was proposed by Joel Brugger, a native of Switzerland, currently a QEII fellow at the University of Adelaide, Australia (MMSN, 2011).

== See also ==
- List of minerals named after people
