= Zigrasite =

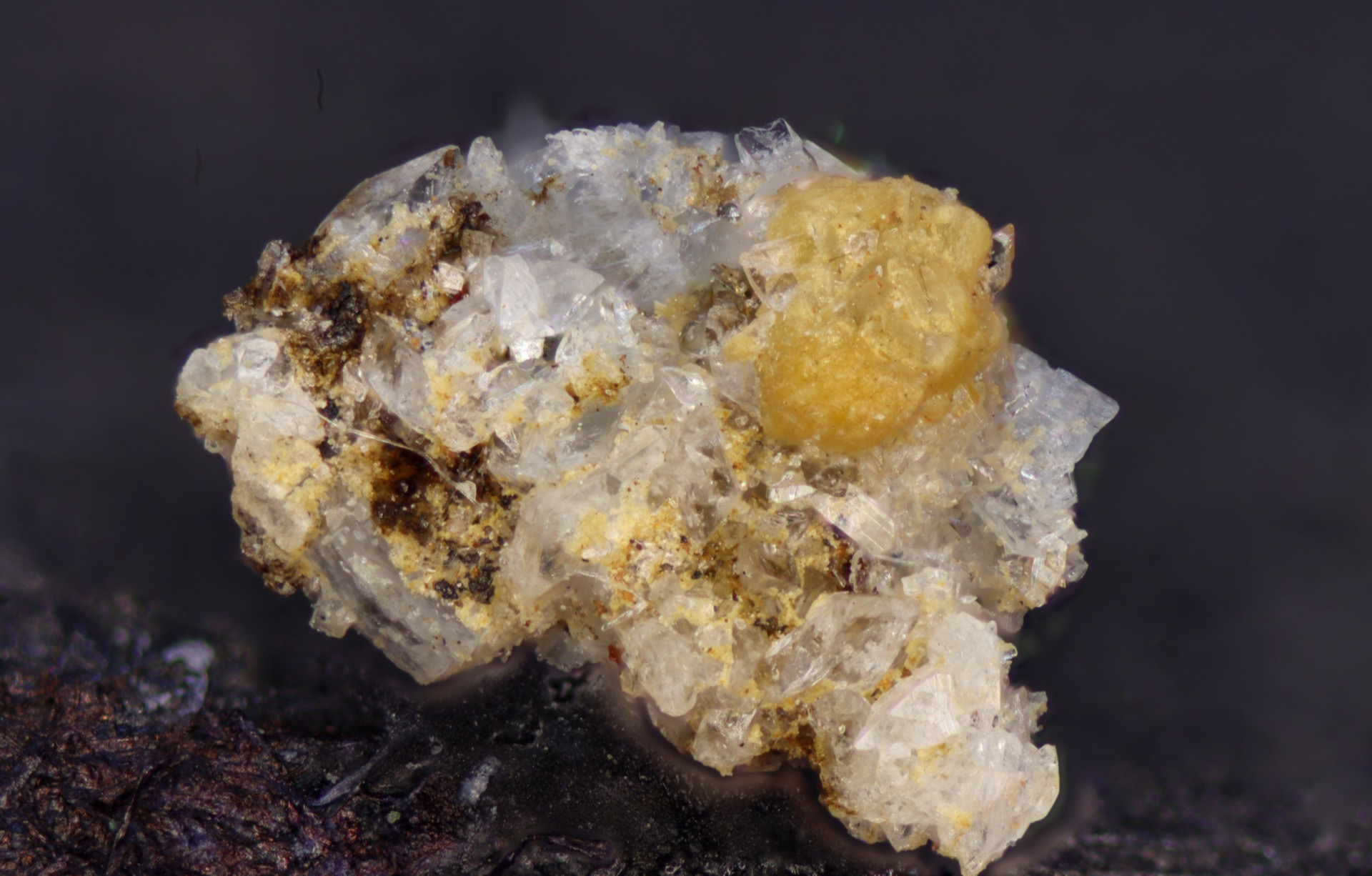

General
- Category: Phosphate minerals
- Formula: MgZr(PO_{4})_{2}(H_{2}O)_{4}
- IMA symbol: Zig
- Strunz classification: 8.CE.75
- Dana classification: 40.1.5.2
- Crystal system: Triclinic
- Crystal class: 1̅ – Pinacoidal
- Space group: P1̅
- Unit cell: a = 5.3049(2) Å, b = 9.3372(4) Å, c = 9.6282(4) Å α = 97.348(1)°, β = 91.534(1)°, γ = 90.512(1)°

Identification
- Color: Off-white to pale yellow or light tan
- Crystal habit: Subhedral blocky
- Cleavage: Imperfect cleavage in two directions, parallel to (010) and (001)
- Fracture: Hackly
- Tenacity: Brittle
- Mohs scale hardness: 3
- Luster: Vitreous
- Streak: white
- Diaphaneity: Opaque
- Specific gravity: 2.76
- Density: 2.76–2.66
- Optical properties: Uniaxial (−)
- Refractive index: α 1.597(1), β 1.622 (1), γ 1.635 (1)

Zigrasite is a phosphate mineral with the chemical formula of MgZr(PO_{4})_{2}(H_{2}O)_{4}. Zigrasite was discovered and is only known to occur in the Dunton Quarry at Oxford County, Maine. Zigrasite was specifically found in the giant 1972 gem tourmaline-bearing pocket at the Dunton Quarry. Zigrasite is named after James Zigras who originally discovered and brought the mineral to attention.

== Occurrence ==
Zigrasite is found in association with tourmaline, microcline, quartz, albite, beryl, amblygonite-montebrasite, childrenite-eosphorite, and apatite. It is crystallized as one of the last minerals during pocket formation. The crystals themselves were found perched on a crystal of tourmaline from the giant 1972 pocket at the Dunton Quarry. The quarry itself is located in a complex rare-element granitic pegmatite that has produced large quantities of gem tourmaline as well as many other rare phosphate species.

== Physical properties ==
Zigrasite is an offwhite to pale yellow or light tan in color. Zigrasite exhibits a vitreous luster, and a white streak. The Mohs hardness is 3. The measured (Berman Balance) and calculated densities are 2.76(4) and 2.66 g/cm^{3} respectively. Zigrasite exhibits imperfect cleavage in two directions, parallel to (010) and (001), it shows no parting, is brittle and has hackly fracture. In transmitted light zigrasite is colorless and non-pleochroic, biaxial negative with indices of refraction α 1.597(1) β 1.622 (1), γ 1.635 (1). Zigrasite is translucent and shows a light blue to pale yellow cathodoluminescence.

== Crystal structure ==
Zigrasite's atomic coordination consists of two phosphorus sites which are solely occupied by phosphorus and tetrahedrally coordinated by four oxygen anions with <P-O> distances of 1.532 and 1.533 Å. There are also two magnesium, both of which are occupied solely by Mg and are octahedrally coordinated by two oxygen anions and four (H_{2}O) groups with <Mg-O> distances of 2.064 and 2.075 Å. There is a single zircon site solely occupied by zircon and octahedrally coordinated by six oxygen anions with a <Zr-O> distance of 2.065 Å.

The zircon octahedron shares corners with six (PO_{4}) tetrahedra to form a pinwheel cluster. This cluster forms a fragment of a Zr(PO_{4})_{2} sheet which is parallel to the (001) direction. Alternating tetrahedra point up and down relative to the plane of the sheet. Isolated Mg(H_{2}O)_{6}) octahedra are arranged in layers parallel to (001). These layers are intercalated between the [Zr(PO_{4})_{2}] sheets linking through the apical vertices of the (PO_{4}) tetrahedra. This structure is formally a heteropolyhedral framework with linkage weaker in the c direction accounting for cleavage.

== Chemical properties ==
Zigrasite is one of three compositional variations in zircon phosphate grains from the giant 1972 tourmaline pocket, representing the magnesium phase with malhmoodite representing the iron phase and an as of yet unnamed calcium-analogue. Zigrasite can be considered to be the magnesium end member for the zircon phosphate grains found in the giant 1972 pocket. Zigrasite exhibits hydrogen bonding which increases linkage within the layer of magnesium octahedra.

== Chemical composition ==
Oxide	wt%
P_{2}O_{5}	37.59
ZrO_{2}	32.27
HfO_{2}	0.34
FeO	0.20
MgO	10.37
ZnO	0.17
F	0.13
LOI	18.60
Sub Total	99.67
Less OΞF_{2}	0.05
Total	99.62

== X-ray crystallography ==
The powder-diffraction pattern was recorded with Cu-Ka X-radiation on a DebyeScherrer camera with a diameter of114.6 mm and a Gandolfi attachment. Refinement of the unit-cell parameters gave the following values: a = 5.321(7) Å , b = 9.360(10) Å , c = 9.660(8)Å , a = 97.38(10)º, b = 91.29(9)º, g = 90.58(9)º, V = 477.0(5) Å 3 . Unit-cell dimensions were also determined on a Bruker single-crystal diffractometer using graphite-monochromated Mo-Ka Xradiation and the resulting values (a = 5.3049(2) Å , b = 9.3372(4) Å, c = 9.6282(5) Å, a = 97.348(1)º, b = 91.534(1)º, g = 90.512(4)º) are in close agreement with those determined by powder diffraction.

Intensity	d-spacing	hkl
100	9.550	001
10	7.489	002
40	4.589	110
50	4.411	02̅1
70	4.108	1̅11
50	4.008	111
30	3.569	02̅2
20	3.273	1̅12
40	3.177	112
10	2.805	02̅3
10	2.688	1̅30
30b	2.660	200
10b	2.198	04̅2
10	2.052	2̅22
10b	2.006	222

== See also ==
List of Minerals
List of minerals named after people
