= Strashimir Dimitrov =

- Born: Страшимир Димитров; 1930
- Died: 2001 (aged 70–71)
- Occupation: historian

Strašimir Dimitrov (Bulgarian: Страшимир Димитров) (1930—2001) was a Bulgarian professor in history and corresponding member of the Bulgarian Academy of Sciences.
