= Bettertonite =

General
- Category: Arsenate
- Formula: [Al_{6}(AsO_{4})_{3}(OH)_{9}(H_{2}O)_{5}]・11H_{2}O
- IMA symbol: Bet
- Crystal system: Monoclinic
- Crystal class: Prismatic
- Space group: 2/m
- Unit cell: a = 7.773(2) Å; b = 26.991(5) Å; c = 15.867(3) Å; β = 94.22(3)°

Identification
- Formula mass: 77.47 gm
- Color: White
- Crystal habit: Ultrathin rectangular laths (< 20 μm)
- Twinning: Not observed
- Cleavage: Perfect cleavage on {010}
- Fracture: Not observed
- Tenacity: Not observed
- Mohs scale hardness: Not observed
- Luster: Vitreous, Silky, Pearly
- Streak: White
- Diaphaneity: Translucent
- Specific gravity: 2.02 g/cm^{3} (calculated)
- Optical properties: Biaxial positive α = 1.511 (1), β = 1.517 (1), γ = 1.523 (1)
- Refractive index: Not observed
- Birefringence: δ = 0.012
- Pleochroism: Non-pleochroic
- Group: Arsenates

Bettertonite is a mineral of the arsenate category, named after John Betterton. He is a museum geologist and mineralogist at Haslemere Educational Museum in Surrey, England. Bettertonite is a white arsenate mineral with a formula of [Al_{6}(AsO_{4})_{3}(OH)_{9}(H_{2}O)_{5}]・11H_{2}O. Bettertonite is in the monoclinic system and has a heteropolyhedral layered structure type. It is a natural forming polyoxometalate. Bettertonite forms in clusters of radiating rectangular laths. Laths are thin and usually < 20 μm laterally. Laths are flat on {010}. Bettertonite is similar to penberthycroftyite and it transforms into penberthycroftyite at low temperatures (67–97 °C).

== Physical Properties ==
Bettertonite is a white and translucent mineral. It has a vitreous and silky to pearly luster. It has a calculated density of 2.02 g/cm^{3}. Bettertonite has perfect cleavage on {010}. Bettertonite’s hardness and fracture were not observed. Bettertonite is nonpleochroic and biaxially positive with α = 1.511 (1), β = 1.517 (1), γ = 1.523 (1).

== Occurrence ==
Bettertonite was discovered in St. Hilary, Cornwall, UK, at the Penberthy Croft Mine. The Penberthy Croft Mine is known for the rare secondary CuPbFe arsenates that have been found there. Bettertonite most likely formed as a product of leaching and the replacement of Al to Fe in pharmacosiderite. Bettertonite infills isolated cavities in quartz veins and is associated with arsenopyrite, chamosite, liskeardite, pharmacoalumite, and pharmacosiderite.

== Structure, WDS data, and XRD data ==
Bettertonite forms in undulating layers that are parallel to (010). These undulating layers are made up of hexagonal rings of AlO_{6} octahedra. The rings are connected by AsO_{4} tetrahedra. The undulating stacking creates water-filled channels along [100]. Wavelength-Dispersive X-Ray Spectroscopy (WDS) and Powder X-ray Diffraction (XRD) were used on Bettertonite to understand its chemical composition. WDS analyses, which included an average of 4 electron probes, yielded the following results when H_{2}O was calculated on structural grounds and the analyses was normalized to 100%: Al_{2}O_{3} = 29.5, Fe_{2}O_{3} = 2.0, As_{2}O_{5} = 30.1, SO_{3} = 1.8, Cl = 0.5, H_{2}O = 36.2. XRD results can be found in a table located below. The empirical formula (based on 9 metal atoms) is Al_{5.86}Fe_{0.26}(AsO_{4})_{2.65}(SO_{4})_{0.23}(OH)_{9.82}Cl_{0.13}(H_{2}O)_{15.5}.

== X-ray powder diffraction data ==
D-Spacing	Intensity
13.648 Å	(100)
13.505 Å	(50)
7.805 Å	(50)
7.461 Å	(30)
5.880 Å	(20)
5.622 Å	(12)
3.589 Å	(20)
2.857 Å	(14)

|

== See also ==
- List of minerals
