= Ferri-obertiite =

Amphibole group mineral

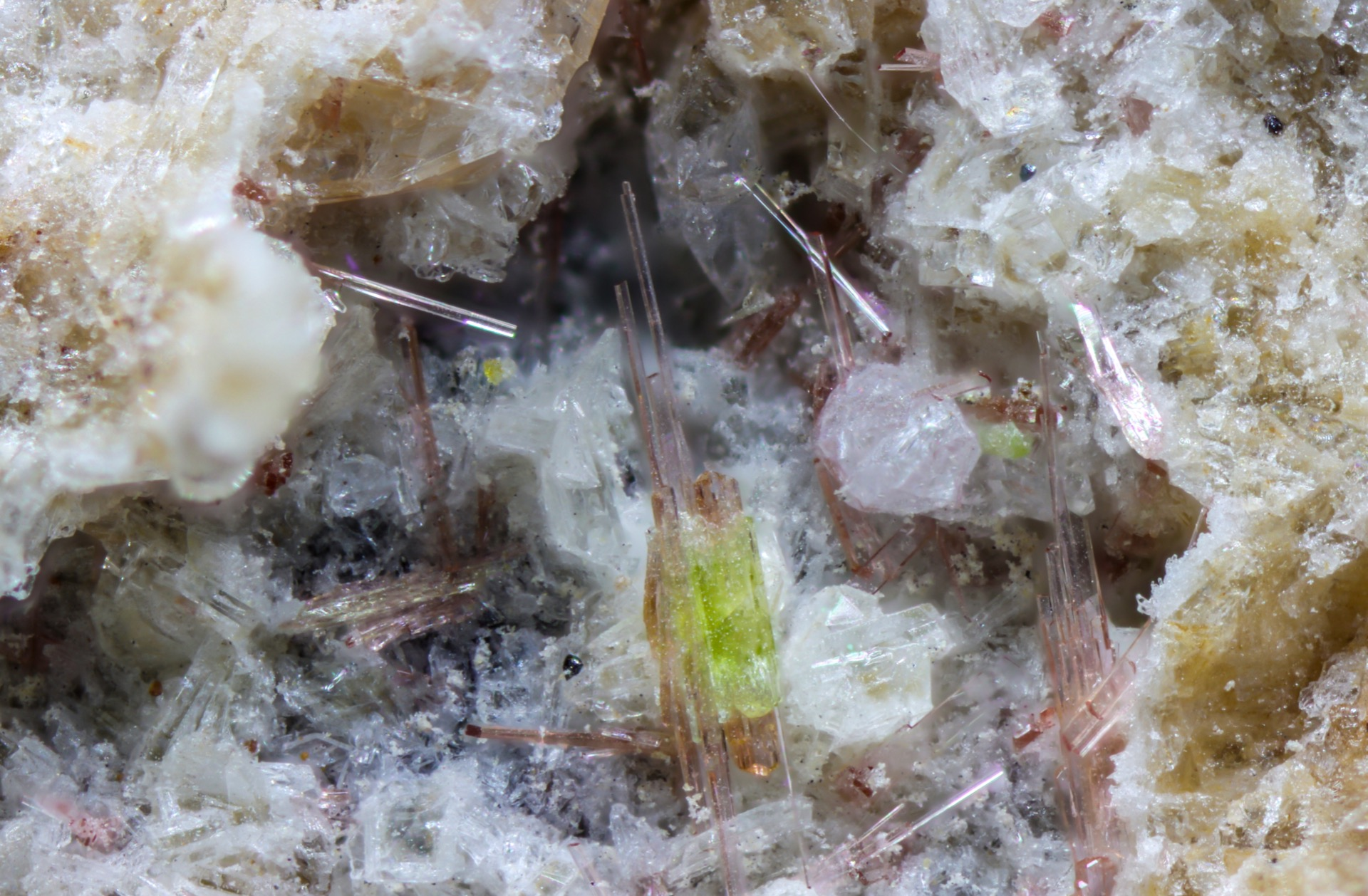
- A close up view of the mineral

General
- Category: Minerals
- Formula: Na(Na_{2})(Mg_{3}Fe^{3+}Ti)(Si_{8}O_{22})O_{2}

Ferri-obertiite is an amphibole group mineral that was formally approved by the International Mineralogical Association in 2015. It has the chemical formula Na(Na_{2})(Mg_{3}Fe^{3+}Ti)(Si_{8}O_{22})O_{2}.

Ferri-obertiite is highly sodic and is especially characterized in the presence of oxygen instead of a hydroxy group or fluorine at the W site, which compensates for the relatively high positive charge due to the dominance of ferric iron and presence of titanium. Similar to many other amphiboles, ferri-obertiite is monoclinic with space group C2/m.

The name honors professor Roberta Oberti of the University of Pavia, Italy.
