= Stromeyerite =

Sulfide mineral

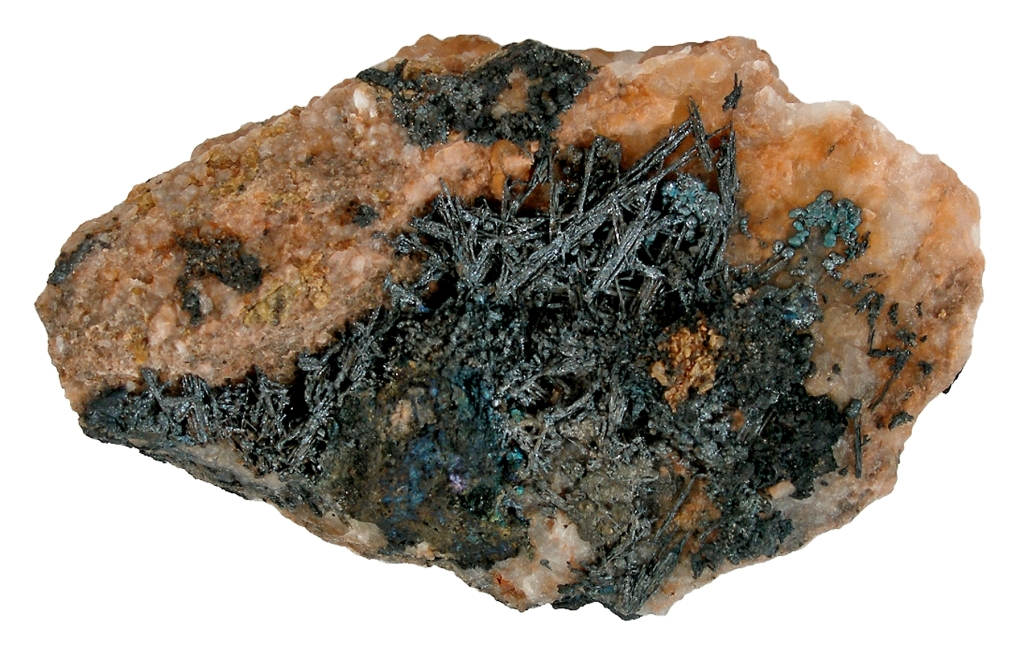

General
- Category: Sulfide minerals
- Formula: AgCuS
- IMA symbol: Smy
- Strunz classification: 2.BA.40
- Crystal system: Orthorhombic
- Crystal class: Dipyramidal (mmm); H-M symbol: (2/m 2/m 2/m)
- Space group: Cmcm

Stromeyerite or copper-silver glance is a sulfide mineral of copper and silver, with the chemical formula AgCuS. It forms opaque blue grey to dark blue orthorhombic crystals.

It was discovered in 1832 in Central Bohemia Region, Czech Republic, and named after the German chemist, Friedrich Stromeyer who performed the first analysis of the mineral.

== See also ==
- List of minerals
- List of minerals named after people
