= Andychristyite =

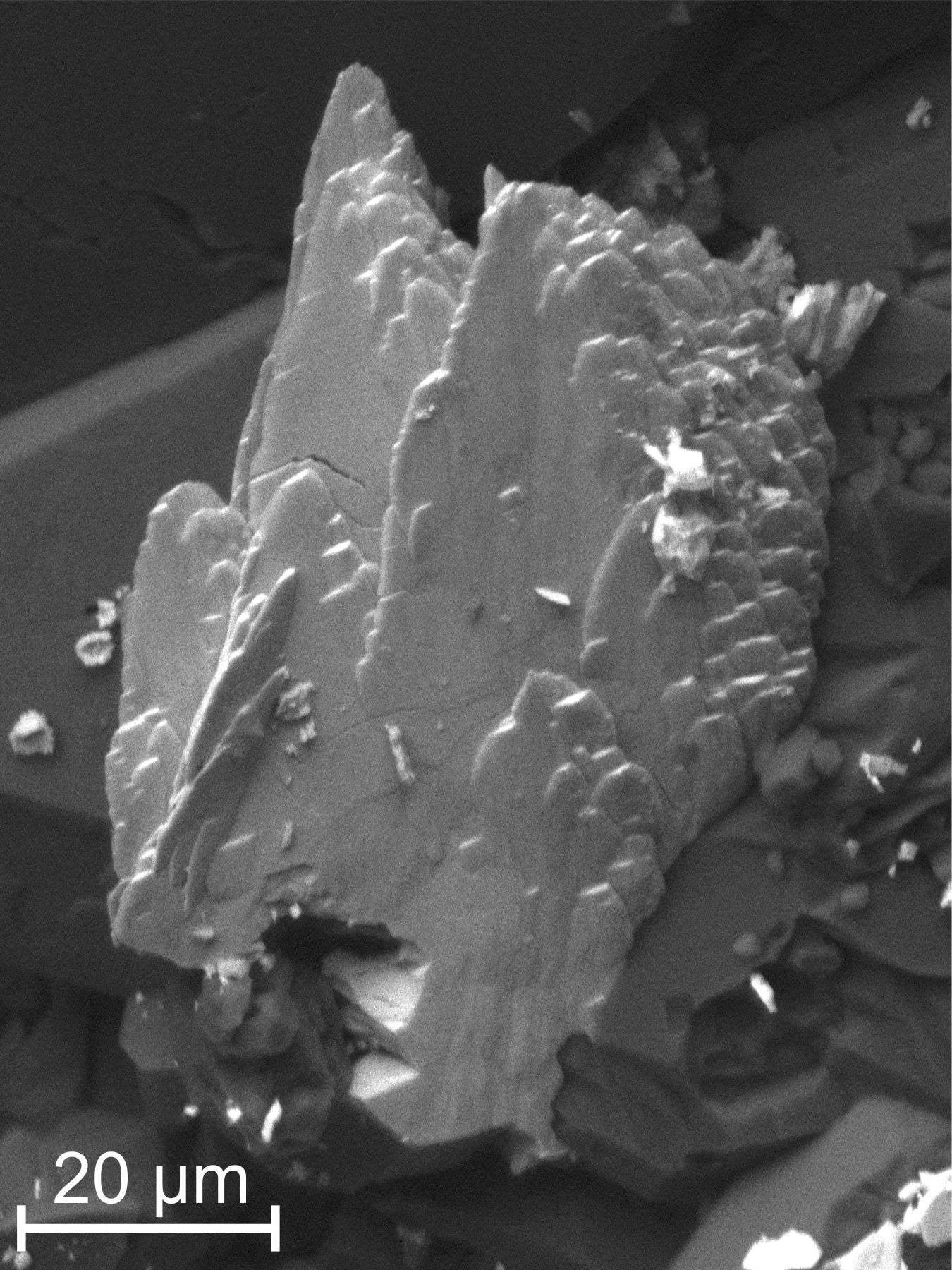
- Electron microscope image of an andychristyite crystal

General
- Category: Minerals
- Formula: PbCu^{2+}Te^{6+}O_{5}H_{2}O
- IMA symbol: Acs

Identification
- Color: Bluish green
- Mohs scale hardness: 2-3
- Luster: Adamantine
- Streak: very pale bluish green
- Diaphaneity: Transparent
- Density: 6.304 g/cm3 (Calculated)

Andychristyite (IMA symbol: Acs) is a lead copper tellurate mineral with the chemical formula PbCu^{2+}Te^{6+}O_{5}H_{2}O. Its type locality is the Soda Mountains in California. It was named after Welsh–Australian mineralogist Andrew G. Christy.
