= Yangite =

General
- Category: chain silicate
- Formula: PbMnSi_{3}O_{8}•H_{2}O
- IMA symbol: Ygi
- Crystal system: triclinic
- Crystal class: pinacoidal
- Unit cell: a = 9.6015(9) Å, b = 7.2712(7) Å, c = 7.9833(8) Å α = 105.910(4)°, β = 118.229(4)°, γ = 109.938(5)°

Identification
- Color: colorless to pale brown
- Crystal habit: bladed or platy
- Twinning: not observed
- Cleavage: perfect on {101}
- Tenacity: sectile
- Mohs scale hardness: 5
- Luster: vitreous
- Streak: white
- Specific gravity: 4.14 g/cm^{3} (measured) 4.16 g/cm^{3} (calculated)
- Birefringence: δ = 0.015
- 2V angle: 77° (measured)
- Solubility: insoluble in water, acetone, or hydrochloric acid

Yangite (PbMnSi_{3}O_{8}·H_{2}O) is a chain-silicate mineral, first discovered within the Kombat mine in Namibia. The mineral is named after Hexiong Yang, a researcher at the University of Arizona's Department of Geosciences. Yangite was approved as a valid mineral species by the International Mineralogical Association in 2012, its description was published in 2016.

== Occurrence ==
Yangite was initially found within a specimen taken from the Kombat mine, located in the Otavi Valley, Namibia. The specimen was obtained from John Innes, a senior mineralogist of the Tsumeb Corporation. Yangite occurs in an ore defined as an epithermal association. This ore type forms with narrow veins composed of galena, rhodochrosite, helvite, and barite.

== Physical Properties ==
Yangite is colorless, ranging to pale brown when exposed to transmitted light. The mineral has a vitreous luster and streaks white. Yangite maintains a Mohs hardness of five, and demonstrates perfect cleavage along {101}. There is no evidence of twinning or parting within the available specimens. Yangite is sectile, commonly found with bladed or platy habit. The mineral is biaxial, elongated up to 12 mm in length along the [010] axis. Yangite is insoluble in several fluids, including water, acetone, and hydrochloric acid.

== Chemical composition ==
Yangite has a consistent chemical composition, determined using a CAMECA SX100 electron microprobe. Additionally, the presence of H_{2}O was confirmed using structural determination and Raman spectroscopic measurements.

Elemental Weight Percent:

element	wt%
Pb	42.08
O	29.24
Si	17.11
Mn	11.16
H	00.41
Total	100.0

== X-ray crystallography ==
Yangite was analyzed by both powder and single-crystal X-ray diffraction. Data was collected using the Bruker X8 APEX2 CCD diffractometer. The diffraction data was influenced by severe peak overlap, leading to uncertainty in the resulting index.

Powder Diffraction Data:

d-spacing	intensity
7.379 Å	100
6.648 Å	48
3.717 Å	44
3.517 Å	38
2.992 Å	38
2.949 Å	40
2.917 Å	65
2.907 Å	55

== Crystal structure ==
The chain silicate structure is formed by double wollastonite chains. These tetrahedral formations run parallel with the [010] axis and connect with Mn-polyhedra and Pb-polyhedra at the corners. The chains are also defined by four-membered and six-membered alternating tetrahedral rings. Yangite has three Si tetrahedral sites, defined as Si1, Si2, and Si3. Respectively, the average bond lengths are 1.622 Å, 1.622 Å, and 1.624 Å. Yangite is composed of an octahedrally coordinated Mn^{2+} cation. Within the crystal structure, Pb^{2+} has a coordination number of five, bonded with O molecules.

== See also ==
- List of minerals
