= Sanbornite =

Phyllosilicate mineral

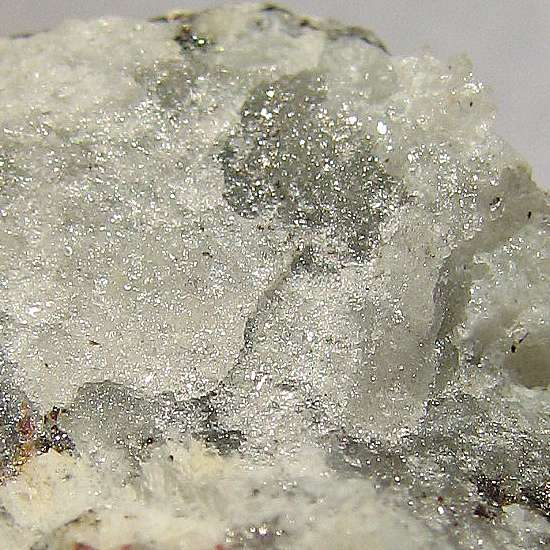
- Sanbornite (white) with celsian (gray)—Incline, Maricopa County, California

General
- Category: Phyllosilicate minerals
- Formula: Ba(Si_{2}O_{5})
- IMA symbol: Sabn
- Strunz classification: 9.EF.10
- Crystal system: Orthorhombic
- Crystal class: Dipyramidal (mmm); H-M symbol: (2/m 2/m 2/m)
- Space group: Pmcn
- Unit cell: a = 4.62 Å, b = 7.68 Å c = 13.52 Å; Z = 4

Identification
- Formula mass: 273.50 g/mol
- Color: Colorless, White
- Crystal habit: Platy modulated layers
- Cleavage: Perfect
- Mohs scale hardness: 5
- Luster: Vitreous
- Streak: White
- Diaphaneity: Transparent to translucent
- Specific gravity: 3.74
- Optical properties: Biaxial (−)
- Refractive index: n_{α} = 1.597, n_{β} = 1.616, n_{γ} = 1.624
- Birefringence: δ = 0.0270
- Dispersion: Weak

Sanbornite is a rare barium phyllosilicate mineral with formula BaSi_{2}O_{5}. Sanbornite is a colorless to white to pale green, platy orthorhombic mineral with Mohs hardness of 5 and a specific gravity of 3.74.

It was first described from Incline, Mariposa County, California in 1932 and named for mineralogist Frank B. Sanborn (1862–1936).

== See also ==
- List of minerals
- List of minerals named after people
