= Irmgard Abs-Wurmbach =

German mineralogist (1938–2020)

- Education: University of Bonn
- Scientific career
- Thesis: Das System NaAlSi2O6 (Jadeit)-NaCrSi2O6 (Kosmochlor) im Druckbereich von 1 bar bis 25 kb bei 800°C (1973)

Irmgard Abs-Wurmbach (December 19, 1938 – April 8, 2020) was a German mineralogist and the mineral Abswurmbachite is named after her. She was professor at Technische Universität Berlin (TU-Berlin).

== Life ==
She was professor for applied mineralogy at the TU Berlin since 1991. Previously, she taught and researched at the University of Bonn, Ruhr-University Bochum, University of Bern and Philipps-University Marburg. She did research in the field of absorption, electron spin resonance and Mößbauer spectroscopy.

== Awards ==
The mineral Abswurmbachite is named after her.
