= Heinrich Vater =

Mineralogist

Heinrich August Vater (5 September 1859 in Bremen – 10 February 1930 in Dresden) was a German soil scientist and forestry scientist. Vater was a pioneer in the areas of forest soil science, land evaluation, and forest fertilization.

In 1884, he received his doctorate at Leipzig with the dissertation Die fossilen Hölzer der Phosphoritlager des Herzogthums Braunschweig. He was an employee of the Royal Saxon Geological Survey, and in 1886, qualified as a lecturer of mineralogy and geology at the Polytechnic Institute in Dresden. During the following year, he became a professor at the Academy of Forestry in Tharandt. In 1898, he became a member of the Deutsche Akademie der Naturforscher Leopoldina.

== Selected publications ==
- Die Bewurzelung der Kiefer, Fichte und Buche, Berlin : P. Parey, 1927.
- Beiträge zur Kenntnis der Humusauflage von Fichte und Kiefer, Berlin : P. Parey, 1928.
