= Pääkkönenite =

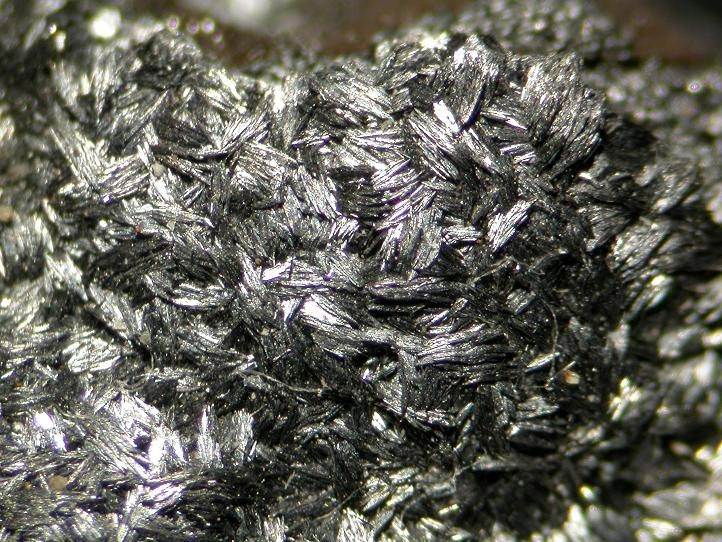

General
- Category: Sulfide minerals
- Formula: Sb_{2}AsS_{2}
- IMA symbol: Pä
- Strunz classification: 2.DB.05
- Crystal system: Monoclinic
- Crystal class: Prismatic (2/m) (same H-M symbol)
- Space group: C2/m

Identification
- Color: Grey
- Tenacity: Brittle
- Mohs scale hardness: 2.5
- Luster: Metallic
- Streak: Grey with brownish tint
- Diaphaneity: Opaque

Pääkkönenite is a metallic grey mineral with the molecular formula Sb_{2}AsS_{2}. It is named after Veikko Pääkkönen (1907–1980), a Finnish geologist.
