= Yegorovite =

General
- Category: Silicate mineral
- Formula: Na_{4}[Si_{4}O_{8}(OH)_{4}]·7H_{2}O
- IMA symbol: Yeg
- Strunz classification: 09.DX.00
- Dana classification: 65.01.09.01
- Crystal system: Monoclinic
- Crystal class: Prismatic; H–M symbol: (2/m)
- Space group: P2_{2}/c
- Unit cell: a = 9.866(7) Å, b = 12.385(5) Å, c = 14.921(1) Å, β = 104.79(6)°, V = 1762(3)Å³

Identification
- Color: colorless
- Twinning: Polysynthetic
- Cleavage: perfect on {(010) and (001)}
- Fracture: splintery
- Mohs scale hardness: 2
- Luster: Vitreous
- Streak: white
- Diaphaneity: Opaque
- Specific gravity: 1.90
- Density: 1.90(2) g/cm³
- Optical properties: biaxial (−)
- Birefringence: δ = 0.008

Yegorovite, ([Na_{4}[Si_{4}O_{8}(OH)_{4}]·7H_{2}O]) is a silicate mineral found in a hyperalkaline pegmatite in the Lovozero Pluton at Mt. Kedykverpakhk in the Kola Peninsula of Russia. It was named in memory of Russian crystallographer Yurii Kavdievich Yegorov-Tismenko, and approved by the Commission on New Minerals and Mineral Names, International Mineralogical Association in 2008.

== Physical properties ==
Yegorovite is colorless, with a white streak. Found in small quantities among pegmatites. It is a natural silicate of alkali cations.

== Chemical composition ==
The chemical composition of yegorovite in elemental weight percent is as follows:

element	weight %
Na_{2}O	23.28
SiO_{2}	45.45
H_{2}O	31.27
Total	100.0

== Crystal structure ==
The crystal structure of yegorovite is made up of a single chain of four silicon (Si) tetrahedrons [Si_{4}O_{8}(OH)_{4}]^{∞} and sixfold polyhedrons of [NaO(OH)_{2}(H_{2}O)_{3}] and [NaO(OH)(H_{2}O)_{4}] centered by sodium (Na).
