= Anandite =

Phyllosilicate mineral in the brittle mica group

General
- Category: Phyllosilicate minerals
- Group: Mica group, brittle mica group
- Formula: (Ba,K)(Fe^{2+},Mg)_{3}(Si,Al,Fe)_{4}O_{10}(S,OH)_{2}
- IMA symbol: Ana
- Strunz classification: 9.EC.35
- Crystal system: Monoclinic
- Crystal class: Prismatic (2/m) (same H-M symbol)
- Space group: C2/m
- Unit cell: a = 5.412(5), b = 9.434(5) c = 19.953(10) [Å]; β = 95°; Z = 2

Identification
- Color: Black
- Crystal habit: Massive, prismatic crystals poorly formed produce hexagonal outline cleavage fragments
- Cleavage: Perfect on {001}
- Fracture: Flexible fragments
- Mohs scale hardness: 3 – 4
- Luster: Vitreous
- Streak: Grey white
- Diaphaneity: Nearly opaque
- Specific gravity: 3.94
- Optical properties: Biaxial (+)
- Refractive index: n_{α} = 1.855 n_{γ} = 1.880
- Pleochroism: Y = green; Z = brown

Anandite is a rare phyllosilicate with formula (Ba,K)(Fe^{2+},Mg)_{3}(Si,Al,Fe)_{4}O_{10}(S,OH)_{2}. It crystallizes in the monoclinic crystal system. It is black in color with a glassy luster and a near perfect cleavage.

It was first described in 1967 for an occurrence in the Wilagedera Prospect of the North Western Province of Sri Lanka in bands of iron ore. It has also been found in Big Creek in Fresno County and in Trumball Peak in Mariposa County, California as well as the Sterling Mine in New Jersey. It was named for Ananda Kentish Coomaraswamy (1877–1947), who was the first director of the Mineral Survey of Ceylon, Sri Lanka.

Anandite is a member of the mica group of minerals. Other minerals that anandite is associated with include: magnetite, chalcopyrite, pyrite, pyrrhotite and baryte.
