= Maricite =

Phosphate mineral

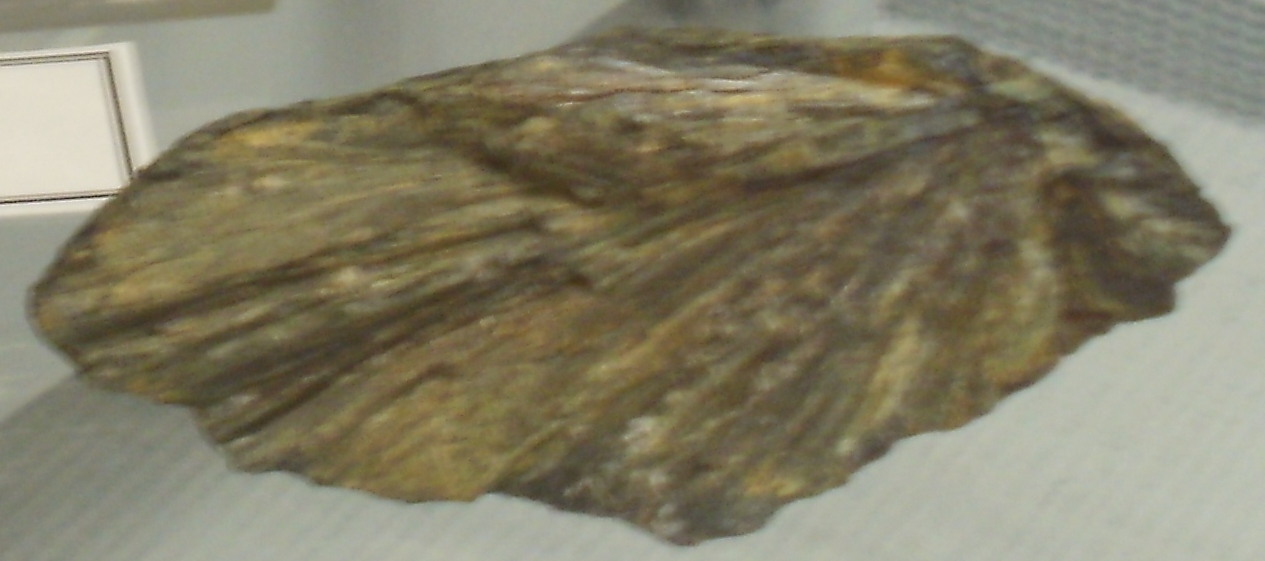
- Marićite from the Rapid Creek area of northern Yukon, Canada

General
- Category: Phosphate mineral
- Formula: NaFe^{2+}PO_{4}
- Strunz classification: 8.AC.20
- Crystal system: Orthorhombic
- Crystal class: Dipyramidal (mmm); H-M symbol: (2/m 2/m 2/m)
- Space group: Pmnb
- Unit cell: a = 6.867 Å, b = 8.989 Å, c = 5.049 Å; Z = 4

Identification
- Color: Dark gray, brown to pale brown, nearly colorless
- Crystal habit: Radial aggregates, nodular
- Cleavage: None observed
- Fracture: Irregular/uneven, splintery
- Tenacity: Brittle
- Mohs scale hardness: 4 – 4.5
- Luster: Sub-vitreous, greasy
- Streak: White to light gray white
- Diaphaneity: Transparent to translucent
- Specific gravity: 3.66
- Optical properties: Biaxial (−)
- Refractive index: n_{α} = 1.676 n_{β} = 1.695 n_{γ} = 1.698
- Birefringence: δ = 0.022
- Pleochroism: None
- 2V angle: Measured: 44°
- Dispersion: r>v, weak
- Ultraviolet fluorescence: Not fluorescent

Maricite or marićite is a sodium iron phosphate mineral (NaFe^{2+}PO_{4}), that has two metal cations connected to a phosphate tetrahedron. It is structurally similar to the much more common mineral olivine. Maricite is brittle, usually colorless to gray, and has been found in nodules within shale beds often containing other minerals.

Maricite is most commonly known to be found in the Big Fish River area of the Yukon Territory, Canada, but it has also been found in Eastern Germany, as well as inside of various meteorites around the world. Maricite is named after Luka Maric (1899–1979) of Croatia, the longtime head of the mineralogy and petrography departments at the University of Zagreb.

Maricite is a sodium iron phosphate from the extremely diverse phosphate mineral group. In 1977 maricite was discovered in the Big Fish River area, Yukon Territory, Canada (Fleischer, Chao, and Mandarino, 1979). This is an important geologic location that has provided the discovery of several new phosphate minerals. Maricite is recognized for its possible use in sodium ion battery research as well as its role as a reaction product inside of fossil-fired electrical power generating station boilers which experience corrosion (Bridson, et al., 1997; Ong, et al., 2011).

== Composition ==
Maricite is a member of the phosphate mineral group. Phosphate minerals have one or more metal cations bonded to the phosphate anion PO_{4}. (Hawthorne, F.C., 1998). In maricite the metals bonded to PO_{4} are sodium and iron (Sturman, et al., 1977). The empirical formula for maricite is NaFePO_{4} and it has a molar mass of 173.81 g/mol (Yahia, et al., 2008; Tremaine, Xiao, 1999). The general formula for maricite is ABPO_{4}, (Yahia, et al., 2008). The chemical composition of the mineral was originally determined by the group of Dr. Corlett from the Department of Geological Sciences at Queen’s University, Kingston, Ontario, using electron microprobe analysis, and found to be Na 0.91(Fe 0.89 Mn 0.07 Mg 0.03)P 1.02 O 4.00 (Sturman, et al., 1977) when normalized to four oxygen atoms. The weight percentages were determined using six different points on a thin section and averaging the percentages of each oxide in all of the samples. The results in weight percent average of oxides are as follows: Na_{2}O 16.5%, MgO 0.8%, CaO 0.0%, MnO 3.1%, FeO 37.4%, P_{2}O_{5} 42.5%, with a total of 100.3%. When looking at these results, one may determine that the majority of the oxide weight composition is made of FeO with P_{2}O_{5} making up almost the same weight percentage. There is a significant percentage of the Na_{2}O oxide and an insignificant percentage of the CaO oxide (~0). It is clear from looking at the oxide content of the mineral that the main components are going to be sodium, iron, phosphorus, and oxygen. The oxide factor may be used to determine the weight percentages of the individual elements as follows, 1 sodium atom totaling ~13% of composition, 1 iron atom totaling ~32% of composition, 1 phosphorus atom totaling ~18% of composition, and 4 oxygen atoms totaling ~37% of composition (Sturman, et al., 1977).

== Structure ==
Maricite is an ionic double metal phosphate, with a space filling capacity of about 70% (Le Page, and Donnay, 1977). The structure of maricite contains a sodium cation enclosed by ten oxygen anions within 10 Å, in an irregular coordination. There is (2+2+2) type distorted tetrahedron around the iron (Bridson, et al., 1997). The Å distances between iron and oxygen are between 2.33 and 2.93. The phosphate tetrahedron is almost regular, with 2 short bonds and 2 longer bonds (Bridson, et al., 1997). The iron atom has four surrounding oxygen atoms giving it tetrahedral coordination. Half of the oxygen atoms are coordinated with two sodium atoms, two iron atoms, and one phosphorus atom while the other half are coordinated with three sodium atoms, one iron atom and one phosphorus atom (Bridson, et al., 1997). The structure of maricite has been compared to the structure of olivine, (Lee, et al., 2011). The structures of the two minerals are similar because they both contain PO_{4} in their atomic make-up (Moreau, et al., 2010). However, the M1 and M2 sites for LiFePO_{4} and NaFePO_{4} have reverse occupancies making their structures different (Lee, et al., 2011). In olivine, the M1 site holds the alkali metal while the M2 site holds the transition metal, whereas in maricite, the M1 site holds the transition metal and the M2 site holds the alkali metal (Ong, et al., 2011).

== Physical properties ==
Maricite (NaFePO_{4}), is found in elongated grains up to 15 cm long in the [100] direction. The grains are radial to sub parallel in structure. Maricite is usually colorless to gray, but is sometimes a pale brown color and it has a white streak. It has a vitreous luster due to its low values of refractive indices, α = 1.676 β = 1.695 γ = 1.698, and its opacity is transparent to translucent (Fleisher, et al., 1979). Maricite has no cleavage or pleochroism, and it does not fluoresce in UV light. Maricite has a hardness of 4–4.5 and a density of 3.64. The mineral is brittle, with an uneven splintery fracture. It is a member of the orthorhombic crystal class and the biaxial negative optical class and has a 2V calculation of 43°. The Hermann-Mauguin notation symbol is 2/m 2/m 2/m, and it is in the Pmnb space group. Yvon Le Page and Gabrielle Donnay determined that the cell dimensions are a 6.864(2), b 8.994(2), and c 5.049(1). J. A. Mandarino determined the d-spacings using x-ray powder diffraction and Bragg’s law to be 2.574 at an intensity of 100, 2.729 at an intensity of 90, 2.707 at an intensity of 80, 1.853 at an intensity of 60, 3.705 at an intensity of 40, 2.525 at an intensity of 30, and 1.881 also at an intensity of 30 (Fleisher, et al., 1979; Sturman, et al., 1977).

== Geologic occurrence ==
Maricite was first discovered in the Big Fish River area near the eastern border of the Yukon Territory around Latitude 68° 30’ N and Longitude 136° 30’ W. This area is a kulanite-baricite-peniksite type locality composed mostly of bedded shales and sideritic limestones. Maricite has been found in nodules up to 15 cm long within the shale beds. Some of the nodules contained only one mineral, while others contained several different minerals. Very few of the nodules consisted of only maricite. Most of the samples which contained maricite also had quartz, ludlamite, vivianite, pyrite and/or wolfeite. When samples which appeared to only contain maricite were examined closely in a thin section, there were small inclusions of ludlamite, quartz, and vivianite present along the fractures (Sturman, et al., 1977). The other location which formations of maricite have been found is Saxony, Germany (Thomas, R. and Webster J.D., 2000). Both this location and the Big Fish River Canada location are situated just north of convergent plate boundaries. Both areas consist of mountains and hills which are made of metamorphic and igneous rocks (Thomas, R. and Webster J.D., 2000; Sturman, et al., 1977). Maricite has also been discovered in meteorites found in Eastern Antarctica, Uttar Pradesh, India and Avannaa, Greenland (Johnson, et al., 2001; Kracher, et al., 1977; Partridge, et al., 1990).

== History ==
Maricite was named by Darko Sturman and Joseph Mandarino in honor of Luka Maric. Maric was the longtime head of the department of mineralogy and petrography at the University of Zagreb in Croatia. The name Maricite was approved in 1977 by the commission on new minerals and mineral names. It is unclear exactly why the mineral was named in honor of Maric, but he did author several geology books including one entitled Magmatiti u Uzhem Podruchju Rudnika Bor u Istochnoj Srbiji, which is Croatian for Magmatites in the Narrower Ore Deposit Region of the Bor Mine (Sturman, et al., 1977).

== See also ==
- Lithium iron phosphate
