= Gormanite =

Phosphate mineral

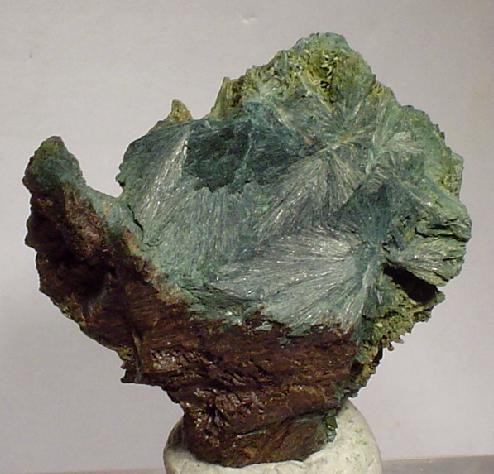
- Gormanite from the Doce valley, Minas Gerais, Brazil (size: 4.2 × 4.2 × 3.0 cm)

General
- Category: Phosphate minerals
- Formula: (Fe,Mg)_{3}Al_{4}(PO_{4})_{4}(OH)_{6}·2H_{2}O
- IMA symbol: Gm
- Strunz classification: 8.DC.45
- Crystal system: Triclinic
- Crystal class: Pedial (1) (same H-M symbol)
- Space group: P1
- Unit cell: a = 11.77, b = 5.11 c = 13.57 [Å]; α = 90.45° β = 99.15°, γ = 90.05°; Z = 2

Identification
- Color: Blue green
- Crystal habit: Aggregates of acicular crystals; pseudomonoclinic
- Twinning: Polysynthetic around [010]
- Cleavage: {001} indistinct
- Fracture: Splintery
- Tenacity: Brittle
- Mohs scale hardness: 4–5
- Luster: Sub-vitreous, greasy
- Streak: Pale green
- Diaphaneity: Semitransparent
- Specific gravity: 3.10–3.13
- Optical properties: Biaxial (−)
- Refractive index: n_{α} = 1.619 n_{β} = 1.653 n_{γ} = 1.660
- Birefringence: .041
- Pleochroism: Strong, X colorless, Y blue, Z colorless
- 2V angle: Measured: 53°

Gormanite is a phosphate mineral with the formula (Fe,Mg)_{3}Al_{4}(PO_{4})_{4}(OH)_{6}·2H_{2}O. It was named after the University of Toronto professor Donald Herbert Gorman (1922–2020).

== Occurrence ==
It was first described in 1981 for occurrences in Rapid Creek and Big Fish River in the Dawson Mining District, Yukon Territory, Canada. At the type localities it occurs as veins in iron phosphate nodules. In the Bisbee, Arizona occurrence, it occurs as large crystals within fractures in a tonalite intrusive. It has also been reported from near Newport, Sullivan County, New Hampshire, and the Charles Davis pegmatite, Groton, Grafton County, New Hampshire. It also has been reported from the Tsaobismund pegmatite, south of Karibib, Namibia.
