= Livingstonite =

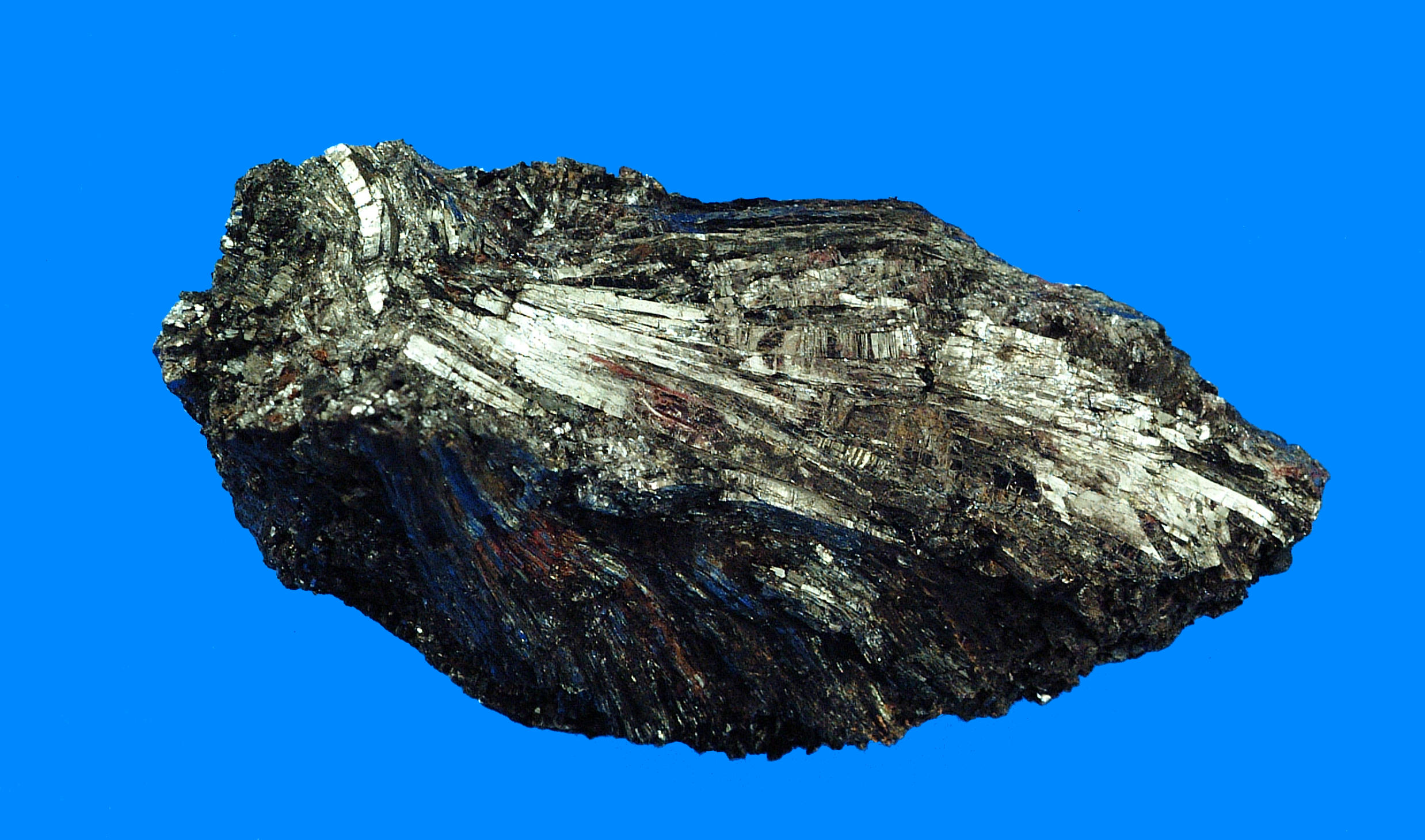
- Livingstonite from Guerrero, Mexico

General
- Category: Sulfosalt mineral
- Formula: HgSb_{4}S_{8}
- IMA symbol: Lst
- Strunz classification: 2.HA.15
- Crystal system: Monoclinic
- Crystal class: Prismatic (2/m) (same H-M symbol)
- Space group: A2/a
- Unit cell: a = 30.567(6), b = 4.015(1) c = 21.465(3) [Å]; β = 103.39°; Z = 8

Identification
- Color: Blackish gray; in polished section, white; red in transmitted light, with deep red internal reflections
- Crystal habit: As needles elongated [010], to 12 cm; also fibrous, massive, columnar, and in globular masses and interlaced needles.
- Cleavage: Perfect on {001}, poor on {010} and {100}
- Fracture: Uneven, flat surfaces
- Tenacity: Flexible
- Mohs scale hardness: 2
- Luster: Adamantine to metallic
- Streak: Red
- Diaphaneity: Opaque, translucent in thin fragments
- Specific gravity: 4.8 – 4.88 meas. 4.98 calc.
- Optical properties: Biaxial (–)
- Refractive index: >= 2.72
- Pleochroism: Weak; strongly anisotropic

Livingstonite is a mercury antimony sulfosalt mineral. It occurs in low-temperature hydrothermal veins associated with cinnabar, stibnite, sulfur and gypsum.

It was first described in 1874 for an occurrence in Huitzuco de los Figueroa, Guerrero, Mexico. It was named to honor Scottish explorer of Africa, David Livingstone.

Its crystal structure was determined in 1957 and redetermined in 1975.
