= List of minerals recognized by the International Mineralogical Association (T) =

This list includes those recognised minerals beginning with the letter T. The International Mineralogical Association is the international group that recognises new minerals and new mineral names; however, minerals discovered before 1959 did not go through the official naming procedure, although some minerals published previously have been either confirmed or discredited since that date. This list contains a mixture of mineral names that have been approved since 1959 and those mineral names believed to still refer to valid mineral species (these are called "grandfathered" species).

The list is divided into groups:

- Introduction • (Main synonyms)
- A • B • C • D • E • F • G • H • I • J • K • L • M • N • O • P–Q • R • S • T • U–V • W–X • Y–Z

The data was exported from mindat.org on 29 April 2005; updated up to 'IMA2021'.

The minerals are sorted by name, followed by the structural group (rruff.info/ima and ima-cnmnc by mineralienatlas.de, mainly) or chemical class (mindat.org and basics), the year of publication (if it's before of an IMA approval procedure), the IMA approval and the Strunz-mindat code. The first link is to mindat.org, the second link is to webmineral.com, and the third is to the Handbook of Mineralogy (Mineralogical Society of America).

- Abbreviations:
  - ^{D} – discredited (IMA/CNMNC status).
  - ^{Q} – questionable/ doubtful (IMA/CNMNC, mindat.org or mineralienatlas.de status).
  - ^{N} – published without approval of the IMA/CNMNC, or just not an IMA approved mineral but with some acceptance in the scientific community nowadays.
  - ^{I} – intermediate member of a solid-solution series.
  - ^{H} – hypothetical mineral (synthetic, anthropogenic, suspended approval procedure, etc.)
    - ^{ch} – incomplete description, hypothetical solid solution end member.
  - Rd – redefinition of ...
  - "s.p." – special procedure.
  - group – a name used to designate a group of species, sometimes only a mineral group name.
  - no – no link available.
  - IUPAC – chemical name.
  - Y: NNNN – year of publication.
  - Y: old – known before publications were available.

== T ==
=== Ta – Te ===
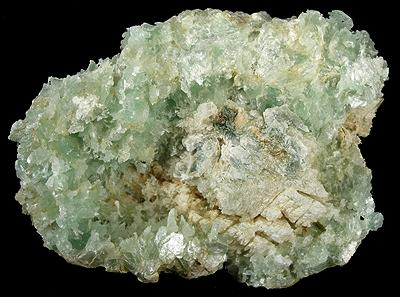
Talc specimen from Vermont with freestanding crystals

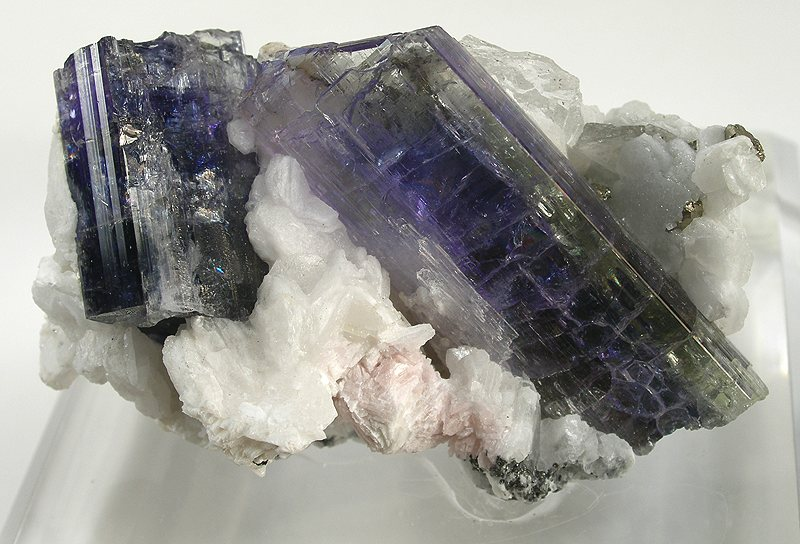
Tanzanite on calcite

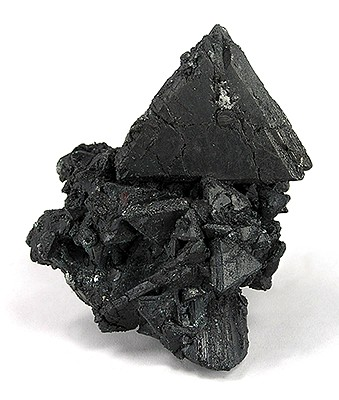
Tennantite. Tsumeb, Otjikoto (Oshikoto) Region, Namibia.

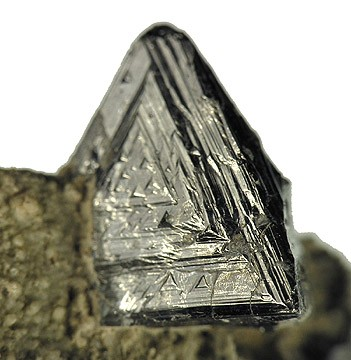
Tetrahedrite - Machacamarca Mine, Machacamarca District, Cornelio Saavedra Province, Potosí Department, Bolivia

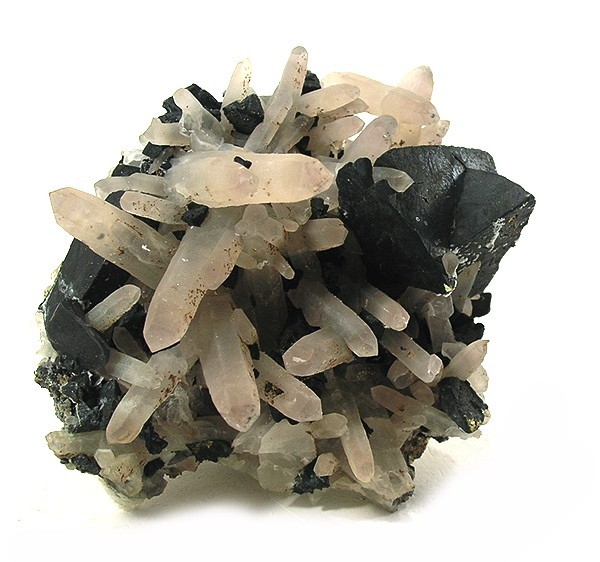
Pyramidal, slate-gray crystals of tetrahedrite have grown in and around translucent, pastel gray, crystals of quartz.

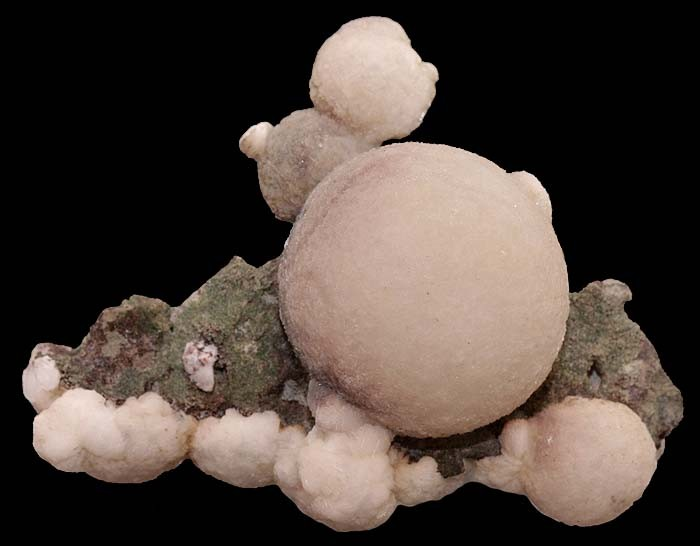
Perfect ball of thomsonite measuring 4 cm, centered on the sparing matrix, surrounded by smaller balls

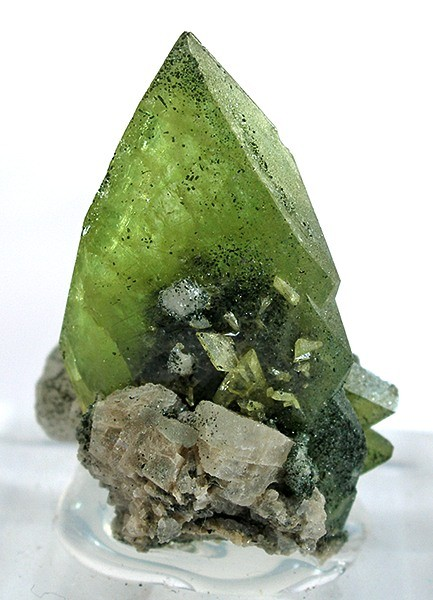
Titanite - Haramosh Mts., Skardu District, Baltistan, Northern Areas, Pakistan

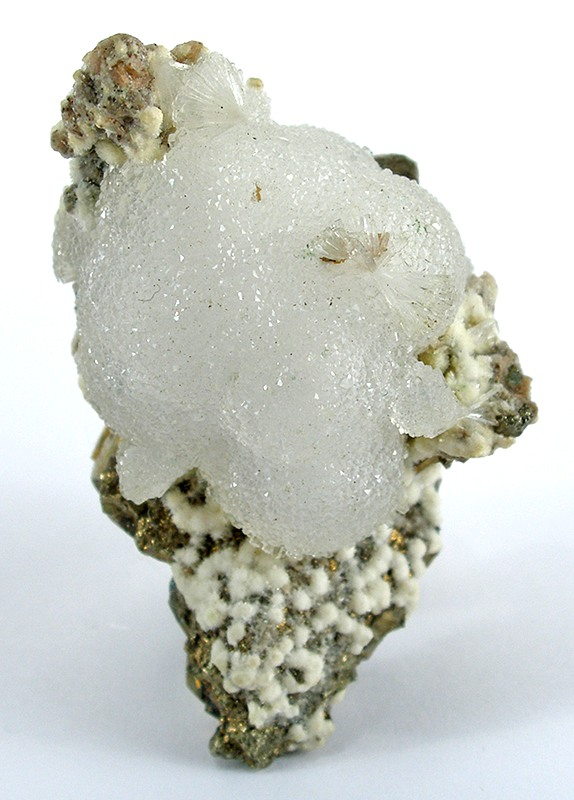
Tobermorite crystals forming a translucent "blob" over matrix of pyrite

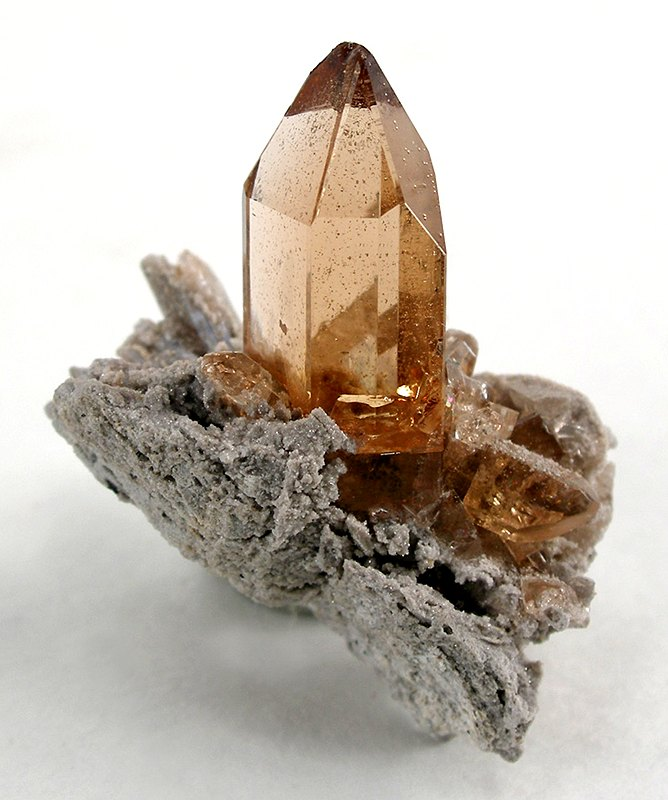
Sherry-colored topaz from Maynard's Claim (Pismire Knolls), Thomas Range, Juab County, Utah, USA

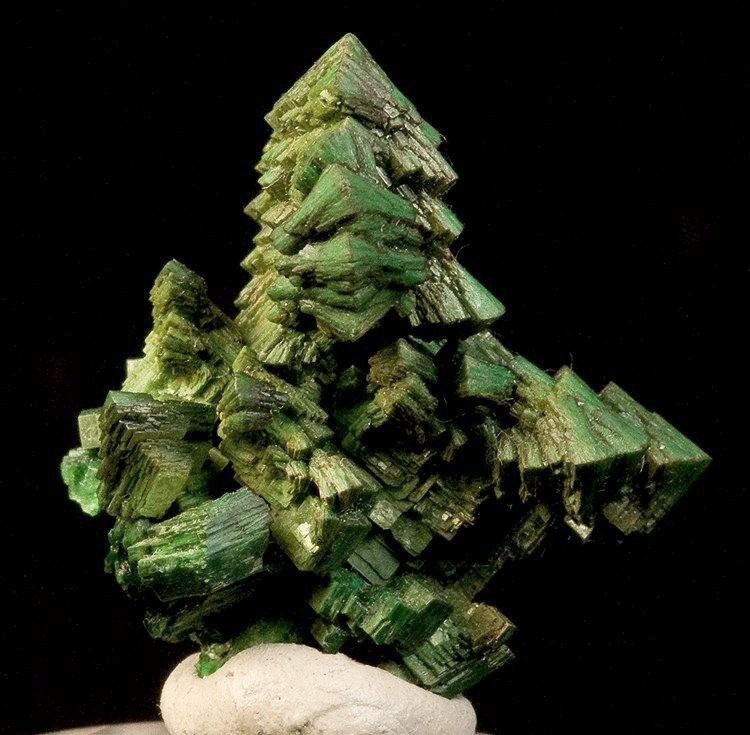
Forest-green, tetragonal crystals of torbernite

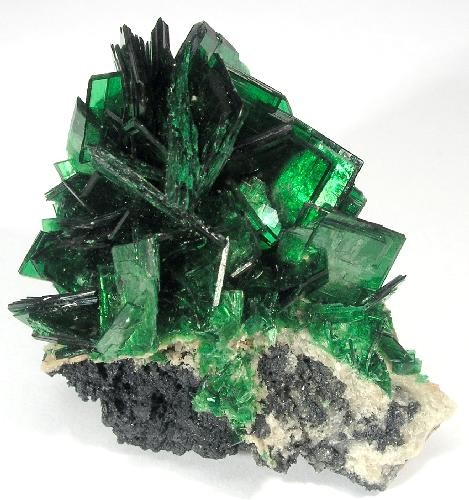
Torbernite - Mashamba West Mine, Kolwezi, Western area, Katanga Copper Crescent, Katanga (Shaba), Democratic Republic of Congo (Zaïre)

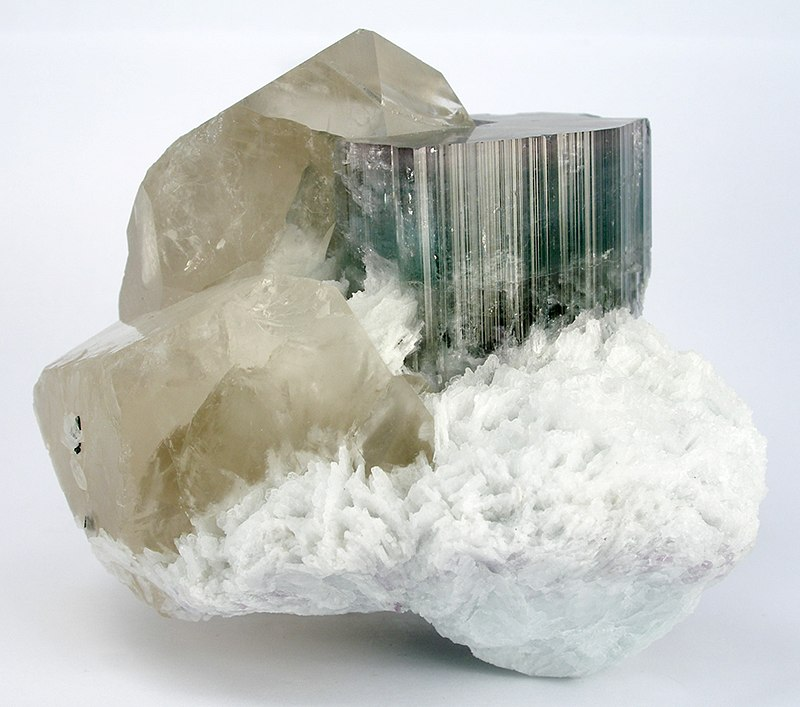
Purple-capped tourmaline, quartz, and albite

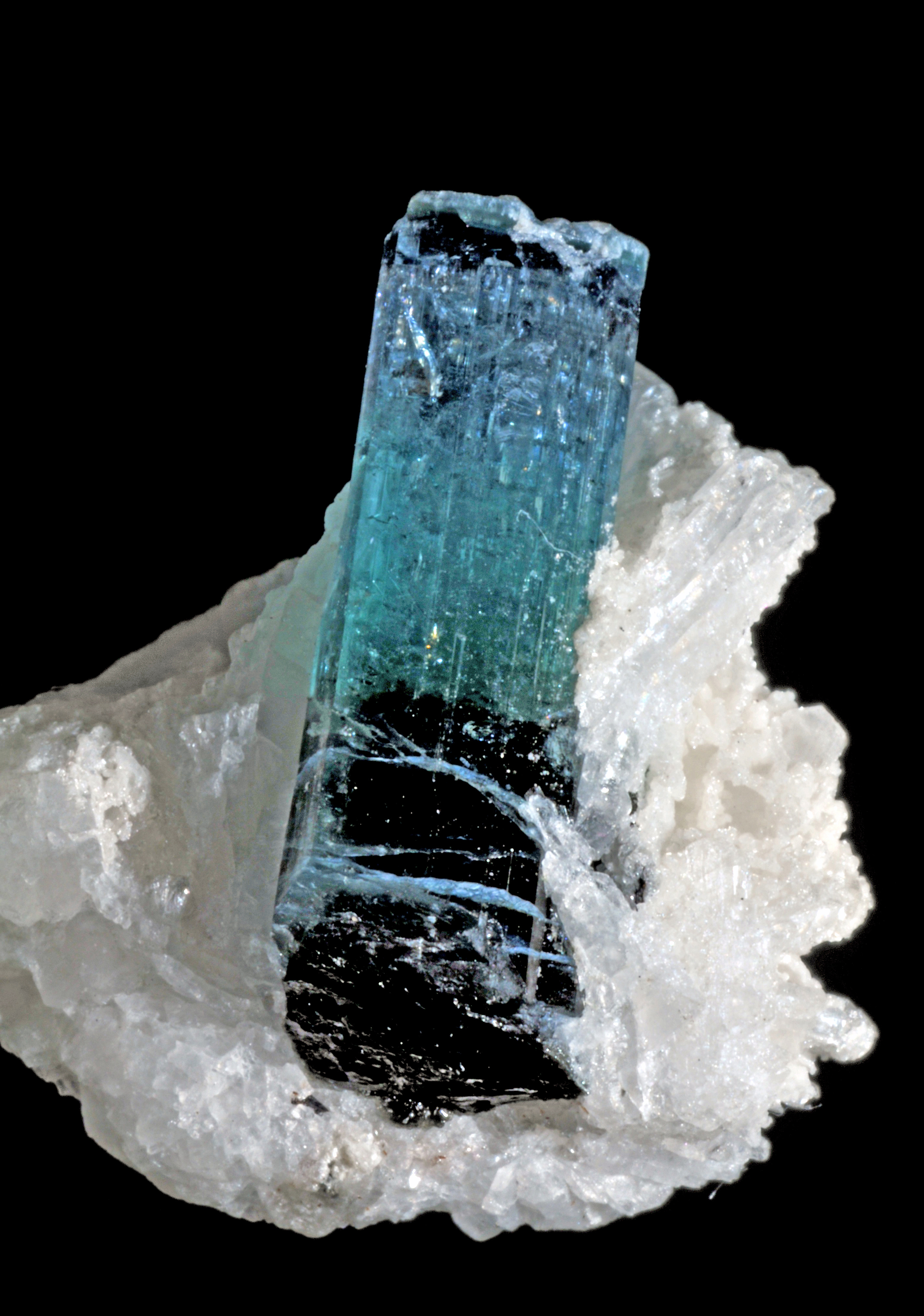
Tourmaline (var. indicolite) on albite

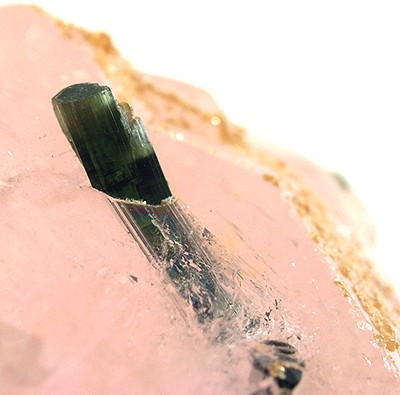
Beryl (var. morganite) with tourmaline. Pederneira claim, São José da Safira, Doce valley, Minas Gerais, Brazil

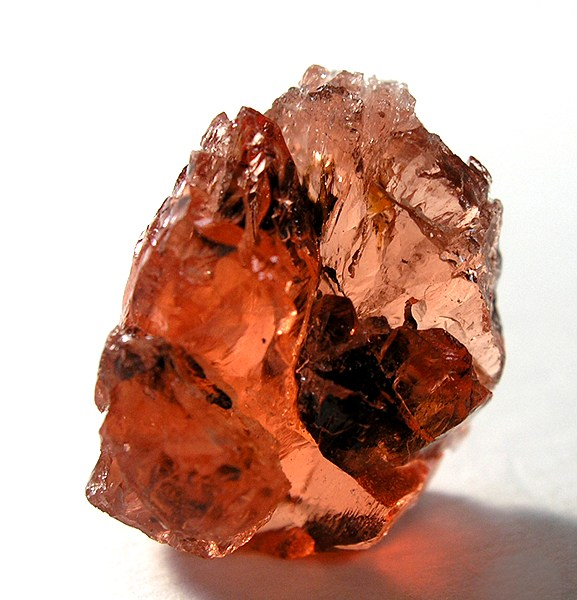
Etched crystal of triplite

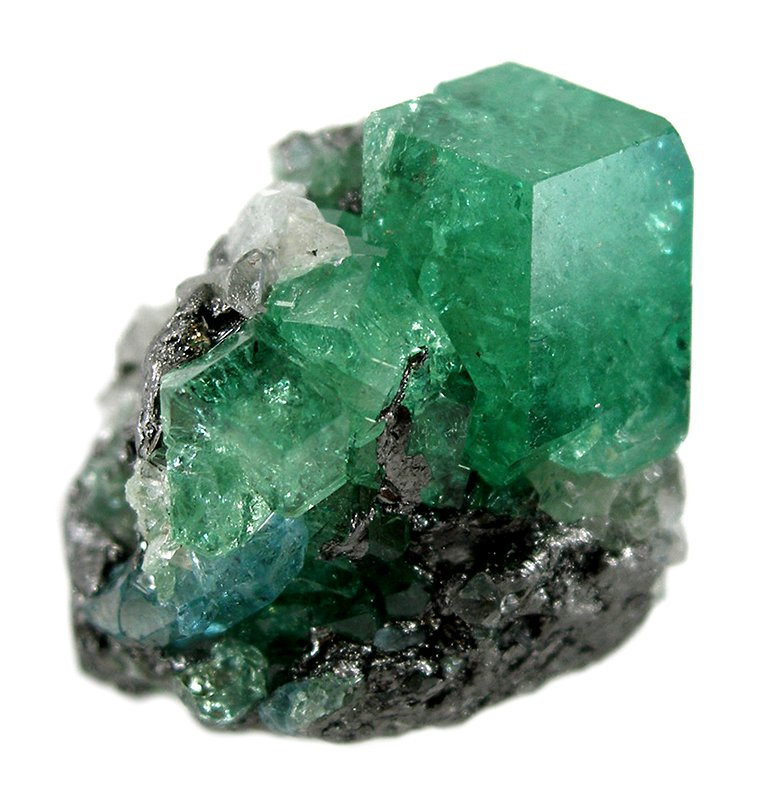
Tsavorite with graphite and apatite

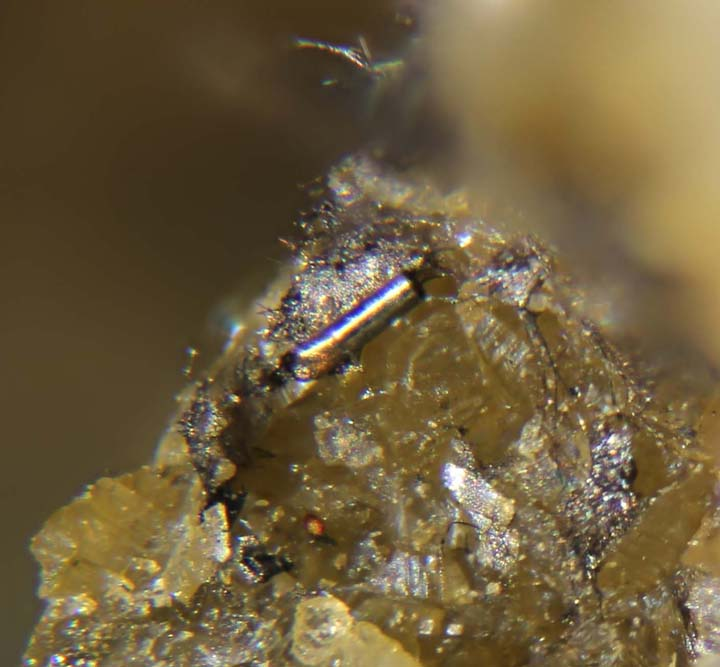
Tubulite

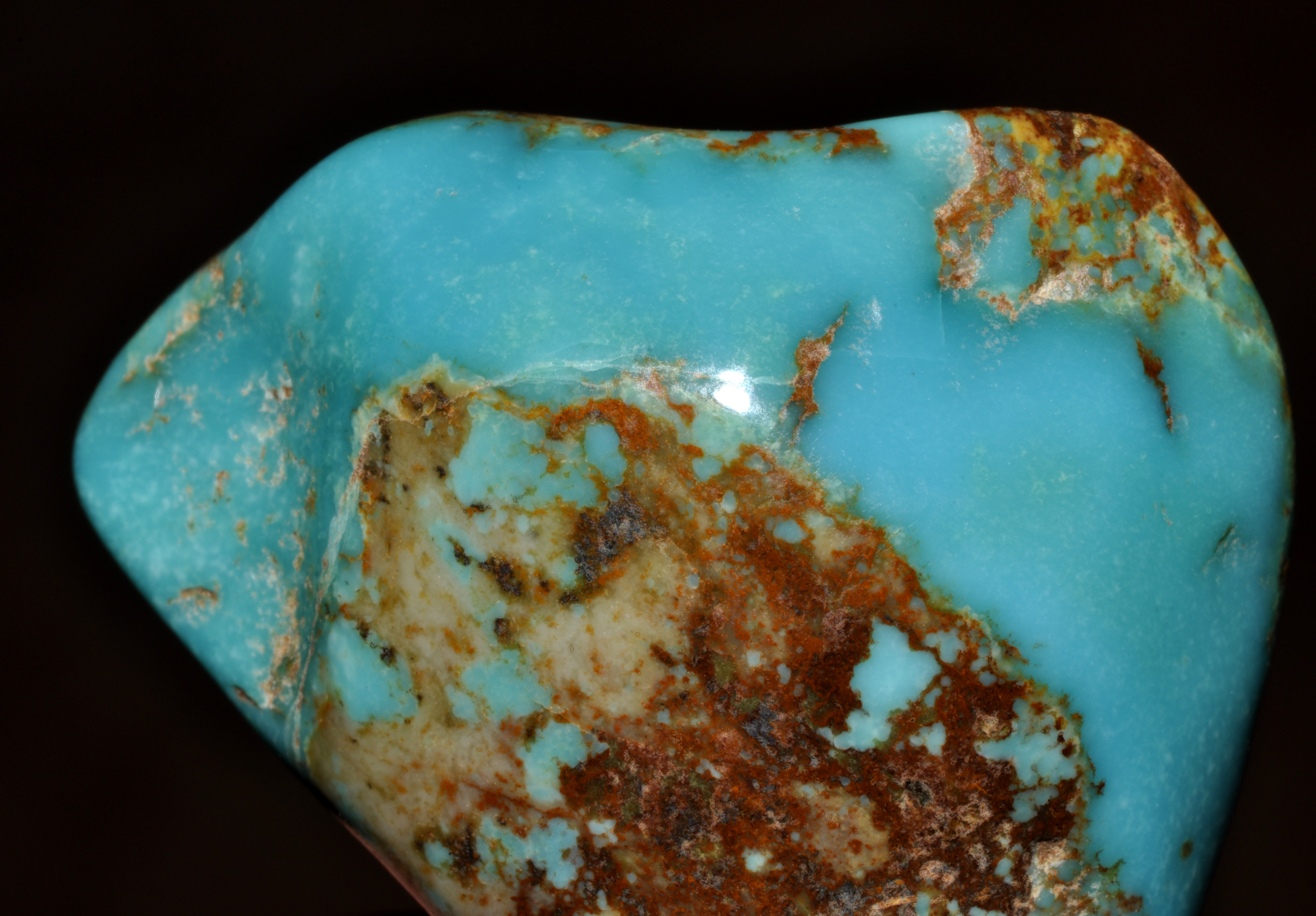
Turquoise pebble, polished. US

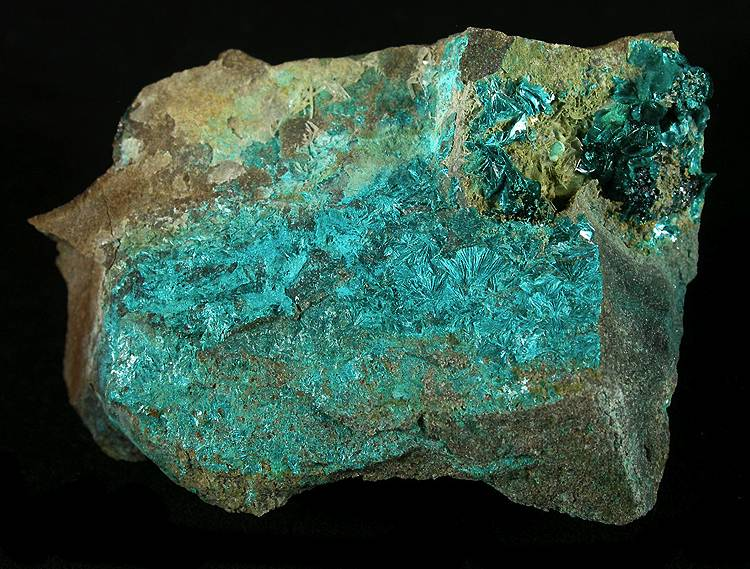
Radial sprays of turquoise-blue tyrolite lathes cover the matrix plate

1. Tacharanite (Y: 1961) 9.HA.75
2. Tachyhydrite (Y: 1856) 3.BB.35
  (IUPAC: calcium dimagnesium hexachloride dodecahydrate)
3. Tadzhikite-(Ce) (hellandite: IMA1969-042) 9.DK.20
4. Taenite (alloy: 1861) 1.AE.10
  (IUPAC: γ-(nickel,iron) alloy)
5. Taikanite (IMA1984-051) 9.DH.25
  (IUPAC: barium distrontium dimanganese(III) dioxy dodecaoxytetrasilicate)
6. Taimyrite (alloy: IMA1973-065) 1.AG.15
  (IUPAC: nona(palladium,platinum) tricopper tetrastannide)
7. Tainiolite (mica: 1901) 9.EC.15
  (IUPAC: potassium lithium dimagnesium decaoxotetrasilicate difluoride)
8. Taipingite-(Ce) (IMA2018-123a) 9.0 [no] [no]
9. Takanawaite-(Y) (fluorite: IMA2011-099) 4.0 [no] [no]
  (IUPAC: yttrium tantalum tetraoxide)
10. Takanelite (IMA1970-034) 4.FL.40
11. Takedaite (IMA1993-049) 6.AA.40
  (IUPAC: tricalcium hexaoxodiborate)
12. Takéuchiite (orthopinakiolite: IMA1980-018) 6.AB.40
  (IUPAC: dimagnesium manganese(III) dioxo(trioxoborate))
13. Takovite (hydrotalcite: IMA1977 s.p., 1955) 5.DA.50
  (IUPAC: hexanickel dialuminium carbonate hexadecahydroxide tetrahydrate)
14. Talc (talc: old) 9.EC.05
  (IUPAC: trimagnesium decaoxotetrasilicate dihydroxyl)
15. Talmessite (fairfieldite: IMA1985 s.p., 1960) 8.CG.05
  (IUPAC: dicalcium magnesium diarsenate dihydrate)
16. Talnakhite (chalcopyrite: IMA1967-014) 2.CB.10b
  (IUPAC: nonacopper octairon hexadecasulfide)
17. Tamaite (IMA1999-011) 9.EG.30 [no]
18. Tamarugite (Y: 1889) 7.CC.10
  (IUPAC: sodium aluminium disulfate hexahydrate)
19. Tamboite (tellurite: IMA2016-059) 4.0 [no] [no]
  (IUPAC: triiron(III) hydro diwater sulfate tri(trioxotellurate(IV)) (dihydroxotellurate(IV)) triwater)
20. Tamuraite (sulfide: IMA2020-098) [no] [no]
  (IUPAC: pentairidium decairon hexadecasulfide)
21. Tancaite-(Ce) (IMA2009-097) 7.GB.50 [no] [no]
  (IUPAC: iron cerium trimolybdate trihydrate)
22. Tancoite (IMA1979-045) 8.BG.15
  (IUPAC: hydrogen lithium disodium [aluminium hydro diphosphate])
23. Taneyamalite (IMA1977-042) 9.DH.65
24. Tangdanite (tyrolite: IMA2011-096) 8.0 [no] [no]
  (IUPAC: tetracalcium octadecacopper octarsenate sulfate octadecahydroxide octadecahydrate)
  Note: approval for the name 'fuxiaotuite' was withdrawn by the IMA-CNMNC.
25. Tangeite (adelite: IMA1992 s.p., 1926) 8.BH.35
  (IUPAC: calcium copper hydro vanadate)
26. Taniajacoite (ruizite: IMA2014-107) 9.B?. [no] [no]
  (IUPAC: strontium calcium dimanganese(III) undecaoxotetrasilicate tetrahydroxyl dihydrate)
27. Tanohataite (pectolite: IMA2007-019) 9.0 [no]
  (IUPAC: lithium dimanganese octaoxotrisilicate hydroxyl)
28. Tantalaeschynite-(Y) (aeschynite: IMA1969-043) 4.DF.05
  (IUPAC: yttrium di(tantalum,titanium,niobium) hexaoxide)
29. Tantalcarbide (carbide: 1909) 1.BA.20
  (IUPAC: tantalum carbide)
30. Tantalite (columbite, tantalite) 4.DB.35
  (IUPAC: (metal) ditantalum hexaoxide)
  1. Tantalite-(Fe) (IMA2007 s.p., 1836) 4.DB.35
  2. Tantalite-(Mg) (IMA2002-018) 4.DB.35
  3. Tantalite-(Mn) (IMA2007 s.p., 1887) 4.DB.35
31. Tantalowodginite (IMA2017-095) 4.0 [no] [no]
32. Tanteuxenite-(Y) (columbite: IMA1987 s.p., 1929) 4.DG.05
  (IUPAC: yttrium di(tantalum,niobium,titanium) hexa(oxo,hydro))
33. Tantite (IMA1982-066) 4.EA.05
  (IUPAC: ditantalum pentaoxide)
34. Tapiaite (IMA2014-024) 8.0 [no] [no]
  (IUPAC: pentacalcium dialuminium tetrahydro tetrarsenate dodecahydrate)
35. Tapiolite (tapiolite) 4.DB.10
  (IUPAC: (metal) ditantalum hexaoxide)
  1. Tapiolite-(Fe) (IMA2007 s.p., IMA83-A, 1863) 4.DB.10
  2. Tapiolite-(Mn) (IMA1983-005) 4.DB.10
36. Taramellite (Y: 1908) 9.CE.20
37. Taramite [Na-Ca-amphibole: IMA2012 s.p., IMA1997 s.p., 1925] 9.DE.20
  (IUPAC: sodium (sodium calcium) (trimagnesium dialuminium) (dialuminium hexasilicate) dihydroxyl docosaoxy)
38. Taranakite (Y: 1866) 8.CH.25
  (IUPAC: tripotassium pentaluminium hexa(hydroxophosphate) diphosphate octadecahydrate)
39. Tarapacáite (Y: 1878) 7.FA.05
  (IUPAC: potassium chromate)
40. Tarbagataite (astrophyllite: IMA2010-048) 9.D?. [no]
41. Tarbuttite (Y: 1907) 8.BB.35
  (IUPAC: dizinc hydro phosphate)
42. Tarkianite (IMA2003-004) 2.DB.30
  (IUPAC: (copper,iron) tetra(rhenium,molybdenum) octasulfide)
43. Taseqite (eudialyte: IMA2002-055) 9.CO.10 [no]
44. Tashelgite (IMA2010-017) 4.0 [no] [no]
  (IUPAC: calcium magnesium iron(II) nonaluminium hydro hexadecaoxide)
45. Tassieite (wicksite: IMA2005-051) 8.CF.05
  (IUPAC: sodium dicalcium trimagnesium diiron(II) iron(III) hexaphosphate dihydrate)
46. Tatarinovite (ettringite: IMA2015-055) 4.0 [no] [no]
  (IUPAC: tricalcium aluminium sulfate hexahydro [tetrahydroborate] dodecahydrate)
47. Tatarskite (IMA1967 s.p., 1963) 7.DG.25
  (IUPAC: hexacalcium dimagnesium tetrahydro tetrachloro disulfate dicarbonate heptahydrate)
48. Tatyanaite (alloy: IMA1995-049) 1.AG.15
  (IUPAC: nona(platinum,palladium) tricopper tetrastannide)
49. Tausonite (oxide perovskite: IMA1982-077) 4.CC.35
  (IUPAC: strontium titanium trioxide)
50. Tavagnascoite (IMA2014-099) 7.B?. [no] [no]
  (IUPAC: tetraoxidetetrabismuth dihydro sulfate)
51. Tavorite (titanite: 1954) 8.BB.05
  (IUPAC: lithium iron(III) hydro phosphate)
52. Tazheranite (fluorite: IMA1969-008) 4.DL.10
  (IUPAC: (zirconium,titanium,calcium) (oxide,vacancy))
53. Tazieffite (IMA2008-012) 2.0 [no]
  (Pb_{20}Cd_{2}(As,Bi)_{22}S_{50}Cl_{10})
54. Tazzoliite (pyrochlore: IMA2011-018) 8.0 [no] [no]
55. Teallite (Y: 1904) 2.CD.05
  (IUPAC: lead tin disulfide)
56. Tedhadleyite (IMA2001-035) 3.DD.40 [no]
57. Teepleite (Y: 1939) 6.AC.40
  (IUPAC: disodium chloro tetrahydroxyborate)
58. Tegengrenite (spinel, spinel: IMA1999-002) 4.BB.20 [no]
  (IUPAC: dimagnesium (tin,manganese) tetraoxide)
59. Teineite (tellurite: 1939) 4.JM.20
  (IUPAC: copper(II) trioxotellurate(IV) dihydrate)
60. Telargpalite (IMA1972-030) 2.BC.45
  (IUPAC: tri(palladium,silver) telluride)
61. Tellurantimony (tetradymite: IMA1972-002) 2.DC.05
  (IUPAC: diantimony tritelluride)
62. Tellurite (Y: 1845) 4.DE.20
  (IUPAC: tellurium(IV) oxide)
63. Tellurium (element: 1782) 1.CC.10
64. Tellurobismuthite (tetradymite: 1863) 2.DC.05
  (IUPAC: dibismuth tritelluride)
65. Tellurohauchecornite (hauchecornite: IMA78-G) 2.BB.10
  (IUPAC: nonanickel bismuth telluride octasulfide)
66. Telluromandarinoite (tellurite: IMA2011-013) 4.JM. [no] [no]
  (IUPAC: diron(III) tri(trioxotellurate(IV)) hexahydrate)
67. Telluronevskite (tetradymite: IMA1993-027a) 2.DC.05
  (IUPAC: tribismuth telluride diselenide)
68. Telluropalladinite (IMA1978-078) 2.BC.30
  (IUPAC: nonapalladium tetratelluride)
69. Telluroperite (nadorite: IMA2009-044) 3.0 [no] [no]
  (IUPAC: dilead (tellurium lead) tetraoxodichloride)
70. Telyushenkoite (leifite: IMA2001-012) 9.EH.25 [no]
71. Temagamite (IMA1973-018) 2.BC.50
  (IUPAC: tripalladium mercury tritelluride)
72. Tengchongite (IMA1984-031) 7.HB.20
  (IUPAC: calcium hexauranyl pentaoxo dimolybdate dodecahydrate)
73. Tengerite-(Y) (tengerite: IMA1993 s.p., 1838 Rd) 5.CC.10
  (IUPAC: diyttrium tricarbonate (2-3)hydrate)
74. Tennantite (tetrahedrite, tennantite) 2.GB.05
  1. Tennantite-(Cd) (IMA2021-083) 2.GB.05
  2. Tennantite-(Cu) (IMA2020-096) 2.GB.05 [no] [no]
  3. Tennantite-(Fe) (IMA18-K, 1819) 2.GB.05
  4. Tennantite-(Hg) (IMA2020-063) 2.GB.05 [no] [no]
  5. Tennantite-(Mn) (IMA2022-040) 2.GB.05 [no] [no]
  6. Tennantite-(Ni) (IMA2021-018) 2.GB.05 [no] [no]
  7. Tennantite-(Zn) (IMA18-K, 1819) 2.GB.05
75. Tenorite (IMA1962 s.p., 1842) 4.AB.10
  (IUPAC: copper(II) oxide)
76. Tephroite (olivine: 1823) 9.AC.05
  (IUPAC: dimanganese(II) tetraoxysilicate)
77. Terlinguacreekite (IMA2004-018) 3.DD.55
  (IUPAC: trimercury(II) dioxodichloride)
78. Terlinguaite (Y: 1900) 3.DD.20
  (IUPAC: dimercury oxochloride)
79. Ternesite (IMA1995-015) 9.AH.20 [no]
  (IUPAC: pentacalcium di(tetraoxysilicate) sulfate)
80. Ternovite (IMA1992-044) 4.FM.15
81. Terranovaite (zeolitic tectosilicate: IMA1995-026) 9.GF.05 [no]
82. Terrywallaceite (lillianite: IMA2011-017) 2.0 [no] [no]
  (IUPAC: silver lead hexasulfa tri(antimonide,bismuthide)
83. Terskite (IMA1982-039) 9.DM.40
84. Tertschite^{Q} (Y: 1953) 6.EB.20
85. Teruggite (IMA1968-007) 6.FA.25
  (IUPAC: tetracalcium magnesium di[arsenic undecaoxohexahydrohexaborate] tetradecahydrate)
86. Teschemacherite (Y: 1868) 5.AA.25
  (IUPAC: ammonium bicarbonate)
87. Testibiopalladite^{N} (Y: 1991) 2.EB.25
88. Tetra-auricupride (alloy: IMA1982-005) 1.AA.10b
  (IUPAC: copper gold alloy)
89. Tetradymite (tetradymite: 1831) 2.DC.05
  (IUPAC: dibismuth ditelluride sulfide)
90. Tetraferriannite (mica: IMA1998 s.p., 1925) 9.EC.20 [no]
  (IUPAC: potassium triiron(II) (iron(III) trisilicate) decaoxy dihydroxyl)
91. Tetraferriphlogopite (mica: IMA1998 s.p., 1925) 9.EC.20 [no]
  (IUPAC: potassium trimagnesium (iron(III) trisilicate) decaoxy dihydroxyl)
92. Tetraferroplatinum (alloy: IMA1974-012a) 1.AG.40
  (IUPAC: platinum iron alloy)
93. Tetrahedrite (tetrahedrite, tetrahedrite) 2.GB.05
  1. Tetrahedrite-(Fe) (IMA18-K, IMA1962 s.p., 1845) 2.GB.05
  2. Tetrahedrite-(Hg) (IMA2019-003) 2.GB. [no] [no]
  3. Tetrahedrite-(Mn) (IMA2021-098) 2.GB [no] [no]
  4. Tetrahedrite-(Ni) (IMA2021-031) 2.GB. [no] [no]
  5. Tetrahedrite-(Zn) (IMA18-K, IMA1962 s.p., 1845) 2.GB.05
94. Tetrarooseveltite (scheelite: IMA1993-006) 8.AD.55
  (IUPAC: bismuth arsenate)
95. Tetrataenite (alloy: IMA1979-076) 1.AE.10
  (IUPAC: iron nickel alloy)
96. Tetrawickmanite (stottite: IMA1971-018) 4.FC.15
  (IUPAC: manganese(II) tin(IV) hexahydroxide)
97. Tewite (IMA2014-053) 4.0 [no] [no]
  (IUPAC: tetrapotassium tetra(tritellurium,vacancy) decatungsten octatriacontaoxide)

=== Th – Tl ===
1. Thadeuite (IMA1978-001) 8.BH.05
  (IUPAC: calcium trimagnesium di(hydro,fluoro) diphosphate)
2. Thalcusite (IMA1975-023) 2.BD.30
  (IUPAC: tetra(copper,iron) dithallium tetrasulfide)
3. Thalénite-(Y) (IMA1987 s.p., 1898) 9.BJ.20
  (IUPAC: triyttrium decaoxotrisilicate fluoride)
4. Thalfenisite (djerfisherite: IMA1979-018) 2.FC.05
  (Tl_{6}(Fe,Ni)_{25}S_{26}Cl)
5. Thalhammerite (IMA2017-111) 2.0 [no] [no]
6. Thalliomelane (hollandite, coronadite: IMA2019-055) 4.0 [no] [no]
7. Thalliumpharmacosiderite (pharmacosiderite: IMA2013-124) 8.0 [no] [no]
  (IUPAC: thallium tetrairon [tetrahydro triarsenate] tetrahydrate)
8. Thaumasite (ettringite: 1878) 7.DG.15
  (IUPAC: tricalcium silicon hexahydro carbonate sulfate dodecahydrate)
9. Thebaite-(NH4) (IMA2020-072) 10.0 [no] [no]
10. Theisite (IMA1980-040) 8.BE.75
  (IUPAC: pentacopper pentazinc tetradecahydro diarsenate)
11. Thénardite (Y: 1826) 7.AC.25
  (IUPAC: anhydrous disodium sulfate)
12. Theoparacelsite (IMA1998-012) 8.BB.65
  (IUPAC: tricopper dihydro pyroarsenate)
13. Theophrastite (brucite: IMA1980-059) 4.FE.05
  (IUPAC: nickel(II) dihydroxide)
14. Therasiaite (IMA2013-050) 7.0 [no] [no]
  (IUPAC: triammonium potassium disodium iron(II) iron(III) pentachloro trisulfate)
15. Thérèsemagnanite (ktenasite: IMA15-K, IMA1991-026) 7.DD.80
  (IUPAC: sodium tetracobalt chloro sulfate hexahydroxide hexahydrate)
16. Thermaerogenite (spinel: IMA2018-021) 4.BB. [no] [no]
17. Thermessaite 3.CG.25
  (IUPAC: di[cation(I)] trifluoroaluminate sulfate)
  1. Thermessaite (IMA2007-030) 3.CG.25
  2. Thermessaite-(NH4) (IMA2011-077) 3.CG.25 [no] [no]
18. Thermonatrite (Y: 1845) 5.CB.05
  (IUPAC: disodium carbonate monohydrate)
19. Thomasclarkite-(Y) (IMA1997-047) 5.DC.20
  (IUPAC: sodium yttrium trihydro bicarbonate tetrahydrate)
20. Thometzekite (tsumcorite: IMA1982-103) 8.CG.15
  (IUPAC: lead dicopper(II) diarsenate dihydrate)
21. Thomsenolite (Y: 1868) 3.CB.40
  (IUPAC: sodium calcium hexafluoroaluminate monohydrate)
22. Thomsonite (zeolitic tectosilicate) 9.GA.10
  (IUPAC: sodium di(metal) (pentalumino pentasilicate) icosaoxy hexahydrate)
  1. Thomsonite-Ca (IMA1997 s.p., 1820) 9.GA.10
  2. Thomsonite-Sr (IMA2000-025) 9.GA.10 [no]
23. Thorasphite (IMA2017-085) 8.0 [no] [no]
24. Thorbastnäsite (bastnäsite: IMA1968 s.p., 1965) 5.BD.20a
  (IUPAC: thorium calcium difluoro dicarbonate trihydrate)
25. Thoreaulite (Y: 1933) 4.DG.15
  (IUPAC: tin(II) ditantalum hexaoxide)
26. Thorianite (fluorite: 1904) 4.DL.05
  (IUPAC: thorium dioxide)
27. Thorikosite (IMA1984-013) 3.DC.40
  (IUPAC: trilead trioxide antimony(III) hydro dichloride)
28. Thorite (zircon: 1817) 9.AD.30
  (IUPAC: thorium tetraoxosilicate)
29. Thornasite (tectosilicate zeolite: IMA1985-050) 9.GF.50
  (IUPAC: dodecasodium trithorium tetra(nonadecaoxoctasilicate) octahydrate)
30. Thorneite (tellurium oxysalt: IMA2009-023) 7.0 [no] [no]
31. Thorosteenstrupine (IMA1967 s.p., 1962) 9.CK.20
  (IUPAC: tri(calcium,thorium,manganese) undecaoxotetrasilicate fluoride hexahydrate)
32. Thortveitite (thortveitite: 1911) 9.BC.05
  (IUPAC: discandium heptaoxodisilicate)
33. Thorutite (brannerite: 1958) 4.DH.05
  (IUPAC: (thorium,uranium,calcium) dititanium hexa(oxide,hydroxide))
34. Threadgoldite (IMA1978-066) 8.EB.20
  (IUPAC: aluminium diuranyl hydro diphosphate octahydrate)
35. Thunderbayite (IMA2020-042) [no] [no]
36. Tiberiobardiite (chalcophyllite: IMA2016-096) 9.0 [no] [no]
37. Tiemannite (sphalerite: 1855) 2.CB.05a
  (IUPAC: mercury selenide)
38. Tienshanite (IMA1967-028) 9.CL.05
39. Tiettaite (IMA1991-013) 9.HA.90
40. Tikhonenkovite (IMA1967 s.p., 1964) 3.CC.10
  (IUPAC: strontium hydro tetrafluoroaluminate monohydrate)
41. Tilasite (titanite: 1895) 8.BH.10
  (IUPAC: calcium magnesium fluoro arsenate)
42. Tilkerodeite (IMA2019-111) 2.0 [no] [no]
  (IUPAC: dipalladium mercury triselenide)
43. Tilleyite (Y: 1933) 9.BE.82
  (IUPAC: pentacalcium heptaoxodisilicate dicarbonate)
44. Tillmannsite (IMA2001-010) 8.AC.80 [no]
  (IUPAC: mercury trisilver vanadate)
45. Timroseite (tellurium oxysalt: IMA2009-064) 4.0 [no] [no]
  (IUPAC: dilead pentacopper dihydro di(hexaoxtellurate(VI)))
46. Tin (element: old) 1.AC.10
47. Tinaksite (IMA1968 s.p., 1965) 9.DG.75
  (IUPAC: dipotassium sodium dicalcium titanium octadecaoxy heptasilicate oxyhydroxyl)
48. Tincalconite (Y: 1878) 6.DA.15
  (IUPAC: disodium tetrahydro pentaoxotetraborate trihydrate)
49. Tinnunculite (IMA2015-021a) 10.0 [no] [no]
  (IUPAC: dihydrate of uric acid)
50. Tinsleyite (IMA1983-004) 8.DH.10
  (IUPAC: potassium dialuminium hydro diphosphate dihydrate)
51. Tinticite (Y: 1946) 8.DC.32
  (IUPAC: triiron(III) trihydroxide diphosphate trihydrate)
52. Tintinaite (kobellite: IMA1967-010) 2.HB.10a
  (Pb_{10}Cu_{2}Sb_{16}S_{35})
53. Tinzenite (axinite: IMA1968 s.p., 1923 Rd) 9.BD.20
  (IUPAC: dicalcium tetramanganese(II) tetraluminium [diboron triacontaoxoctasilicate] dihydroxyl)
54. Tiptopite (cancrinite: IMA1983-007) 8.DA.25
55. Tiragalloite (IMA1979-061) 9.BJ.25
  (IUPAC: tetramanganese(II) hydrogen tridecaoxoarsenotrisilicate)
56. Tischendorfite (IMA2001-061) 2.BC.65
  (IUPAC: octapalladium trimercury nonaselenide)
57. Tisinalite (lovozerite: IMA1979-052) 9.CJ.15a
  (IUPAC: trisodium manganese(II) trihydrogen titanium octadecaoxohexasilicate)
58. Tissintite (pyroxene: IMA2013-027) 9.DA. [no] [no]
  (IUPAC: (calcium,sodium,vacancy) aluminohexaoxodisilicate)
59. Tistarite (corundum: IMA2008-016) 4.CB.05 [no]
  (IUPAC: dititanium trioxide)
60. Titanite (titanite: IMA1967 s.p., 1795) 9.AG.15
  (IUPAC: calcium titanium oxide tetraoxosilicate)
61. Titanium (element: IMA2010-044) 1.AB.05 [no] [no]
62. Titanoholtite (dumortierite: IMA2012-069) 9.A?. [no] [no]
63. Titanomaghemite^{Q} (Y: 1953) 4.BB.15 [no] [no]
  (IUPAC: iron di(iron,titanium) tetraoxide)
64. Titanowodginite (wodginite: IMA1984-008) 4.DB.40
  (IUPAC: manganese(II) titanium ditantalum octaoxide)
65. Titantaramellite (IMA1977-046) 9.CE.20
66. Tivanite (IMA1980-035) 4.DB.45
  (IUPAC: titanium vanadium(III) hydro trioxide)
67. Tlalocite (tellurite-tellurium oxysalt: IMA1974-047) 7.DE.20
  (IUPAC: decacopper hexazinc pentaicosahydrate trioxotellurate(IV) chloro di(tetraoxotellurate(VI)) heptaicosahydrate)
68. Tlapallite (tellurite-tellurium oxysalt: IMA1977-044) 4.JL.25
  (IUPAC: hexahydrogen di(calcium,lead) tri(copper,zinc) dioxo sulfate tetra(trioxotellurate(IV)) tetraoxotellurate(VI))

=== To – Ty ===
1. Tobelite (mica: IMA1981-021) 9.EC.15
  (IUPAC: ammonium dialuminium (aluminotrisilicate) decaoxy dihydroxyl)
2. Tobermorite (tobermorite: IMA2014 s.p., 1882) 9.DG.10
3. Tochilinite (IMA1971-002) 2.FD.35
4. Tocornalite^{Q} (Y: 1867) 3.AA.10 [none]
  ((Ag,Hg)I) (?)
5. Todorokite (IMA1962 s.p., 1934) 4.DK.10
6. Tokkoite (IMA1985-009) 9.DG.75
  (IUPAC: dipotassium tetracalcium octadecaoxy heptasilicate hydroxyl fluoride)
7. Tokyoite (brackebuschite: IMA2003-036) 8.BG.05
  (IUPAC: dibarium manganese(III) hydro divanadate)
8. Tolbachite (IMA1982-067) 3.AB.05
  (IUPAC: copper dichloride)
9. Tolovkite (cobaltite: IMA1980-055) 2.EB.25
  (IUPAC: iridium sulfantimonide)
10. Tolstykhite (IMA2022-007) 2.CB. [no] [no]
11. Tomamaeite (alloy: IMA2019-129) 1.0 [no] [no]
  (IUPAC: tricopper platinum alloy)
12. Tombstoneite (IMA2021-053) 4.JN. [no] [no]
13. Tomichite (IMA1978-074) 4.JB.55
  (IUPAC: tetravanadium(III) trititanium(IV) arsenic(III) hydro tridecaoxide)
14. Tomiolloite (IMA2021-019) [no] [no]
15. Tondiite (atacamite: IMA2013-077) 3.0 [no]
  (IUPAC: tricopper magnesium hexahydro dichloride)
16. Tongbaite (carbide: IMA1982-003) 1.BA.15
  (IUPAC: trichromium dicarbide)
17. Tooeleite (IMA1990-010) 4.JD.15
  (IUPAC: hexairon(III) tetra(trioxoarsenate) tetrahydro sulfate tetrahydrate)
18. Topaz (Y: 1737) 9.AF.35
  (IUPAC: dialuminiium tetraoxosilicate difluorine)
19. Topsøeite (IMA2016-113) 3.0 [no] [no]
  (IUPAC: iron trifluoride triwater)
20. Torbernite (IMA1980 s.p., 1790) 8.EB.05
  (IUPAC: copper diuranyl diphosphate dodecahydrate)
21. Törnebohmite (fornacite) 9.AG.45
  (IUPAC: diREE aluminium di(tetrasilicate) hydroxyl)
  1. Törnebohmite-(Ce) (IMA1966 s.p., 1921) 9.AG.45
  2. Törnebohmite-(La) (IMA1966 s.p., 1921) 9.AG.45
22. Törnroosite (isomertieite: IMA2010-043) 2.0 [no] [no]
  (Pd_{11}As_{2}Te_{2})
23. Torrecillasite (IMA2013-112) 4.0 [no]
  (IUPAC: sodium tetra(arsenic(III),antimony(III)) chloro hexaoxide)
24. Torreyite (Y: 1949) 7.DD.40
  (IUPAC: nonamagnesium tetrazinc docosahydro disulfate octahydrate)
25. Torryweiserite (IMA2020-048) 2.0 [no] [no]
26. Tosudite (corrensite: 1963) 9.EC.60
  A 1:1 regular interstratification of a chlorite group mineral and a smectite group mineral.
27. Toturite (garnet: IMA2009-033) 9.AD.25 [no] [no]
  (IUPAC: tricalcium ditin (diiron(III) silicate) dodecaoxy)
28. Tounkite (cancrinite-sodalite: IMA1990-009) 9.FB.05
29. Townendite (lovozerite: IMA2009-066) 9.CJ. [no] [no]
  (IUPAC: octasodium zirconium octadecaoxohexasilicate)
30. Toyohaite (IMA1989-007) 2.DA.10
  (IUPAC: disilver iron tritin octasulfide)
31. Trabzonite (IMA1983-071a) 9.BJ.15
  (IUPAC: tetracalcium [nonaoxotrisilicate hydroxyl] hydroxyl)
32. Tranquillityite (braunite: IMA1971-013) 9.AG.90
  (IUPAC: octairon(II) trititanium dizirconium tetraicosaoxotrisilicate)
33. Transjordanite (barringerite: IMA2013-106) 1.0 [no] [no]
  (IUPAC: dinickel phosphide)
34. Traskite (IMA1964-014) 9.CP.05
35. Trattnerite (milarite: IMA2002-002) 9.CM.05
36. Treasurite (lillianite: IMA1976-008) 2.JB.40a
  (Ag_{7}Pb_{6}Bi_{15}S_{30})
37. Trébeurdenite (hydrotalcite: IMA2012 s.p.) 4.FL. [no] [no]
  (IUPAC: diiron(II) tetrairon(III) dioxodecahydroxide carbonate trihydrate, Fe^{2+}:Fe^{3+} = 1:2)
38. Trebiskyite (IMA2019-131) 4.0 [no] [no]
39. Trechmannite (Y: 1905) 2.GC.35
  (IUPAC: silver disulfarsenide)
40. Tredouxite (tapiolite: IMA2017-061) 4.0 [no] [no]
  (IUPAC: nickel diantimony hexaoxide)
41. Trembathite (boracite: IMA1991-018) 6.GA.10
  (IUPAC: trimagnesium chloro tridecaoxoheptaborate)
42. Tremolite [Ca-amphibole: IMA2012 s.p., IMA1997 s.p., 1789] 9.DE.10
43. Trevorite (spinel, spinel: 1921) 4.BB.05
  (IUPAC: nickel diiron(III) tetraoxide)
44. Triangulite (IMA1981-056) 8.EB.45
  (IUPAC: trialuminium tetrauranyl pentahydro tetraphosphate pentahydrate)
45. Triazolite (triazolate: IMA2017-025) 10.0 [no] [no]
46. Tridymite (Y: 1868) 4.DA.10
  (IUPAC: dioxosilicate)
47. Trigonite (Y: 1920) 4.JB.40
  (IUPAC: trilead manganese(II) di(trioxoarsenate(III)) hydrodioxoarsenate(III))
48. Trikalsilite (feldspathoid, nepheline: 1957) 9.FA.05
  (IUPAC: dipotassium sodium trialuminium tri(tetraoxosilicate))
49. Trilithionite (mica: IMA1998 s.p. Rd) 9.EC.20 [no]
  (IUPAC: dipotassium trilithium trialuminium (dialuminohexasilicate) icosaoxy tetrafluorine)
50. Trimerite (beryllonite: 1891) 9.AB.05
  (IUPAC: calcium triberyllium dimanganese(II) tri(tetraoxosilicate))
51. Trimounsite-(Y) (IMA1989-042) 9.AG.25
  (IUPAC: diyttrium dititanium nonaoxosilicate)
52. Trinepheline (IMA2012-024) 9.A?. [no]
  (IUPAC: sodium aluminium tetraoxosilicate)
53. Triphylite (olivine: 1834) 8.AB.10
  (IUPAC: lithium iron(II) phosphate)
54. Triplite (Y: 1813) 8.BB.10
  (IUPAC: di(manganese(II),iron(II)) fluoro phosphate)
55. Triploidite (wagnerite: 1878) 8.BB.15
  (IUPAC: dimanganese(II) hydro phosphate)
56. Trippkeite (trippkeite: 1880) 4.JA.20
  (IUPAC: copper(II) diarsenic(III) tetraoxide)
57. Tripuhyite (rutile: IMA2002 s.p., IMA1987-022 Rd) 4.DB.05
  (IUPAC: iron(III) antimony(V) tetraoxide)
58. Tristramite (rhabdophane: IMA1982-037) 8.CJ.45
59. Tritomite (apatite, britholite) 9.AH.25
  1. Tritomite-(Ce) (IMA1987 s.p.) 9.AH.25
  2. Tritomite-(Y) (IMA1966 s.p., 1961) 9.AH.25
60. Trögerite (natroautunite: 1871) 8.EB.15
  (IUPAC: hydronium uranyl arsenate trihydrate)
61. Trogtalite (pyrite: 1955) 2.EB.05a
  (IUPAC: cobalt diselenide)
62. Troilite (Y: 1863) 2.CC.10
  (IUPAC: iron sulfide)
63. Trolleite (Y: 1868) 8.BB.45
  (IUPAC: tetraluminium trihydro triphosphate)
64. Trona (Y: 1747) 5.CB.15
  (IUPAC: trisodium bicarbonate carbonate dihydrate)
65. Truscottite (gyrolite: 1914) 9.EE.35
66. Trüstedtite (spinel, linnaeite: IMA1967 s.p., 1964) 2.DA.05
  (IUPAC: nickel(II) dinickel(III) tetraselenide)
67. Tsangpoite (IMA2014-110) 8.0 [no] [no]
  (IUPAC: pentacalcium diphosphate tetraoxosilicate)
68. Tsaregorodtsevite (sodalite: IMA1991-042) 9.FB.10
  (IUPAC: tetramethylammonium tetrasilicon (aluminosilicate) dodecaoxide)
69. Tschaunerite (spinel: IMA2017-032a) 4.0 [no] [no]
70. Tschermakite [Ca-amphibole: IMA2012 s.p., IMA1997 s.p., 1945] 9.DE.10
71. Tschermigite (alum: 1832) 7.CC.20
  (IUPAC: ammonium aluminium disulfate dodecahydrate)
72. Tschernichite (zeolitic tectosilicate: IMA1989-037) 9.GF.30
73. Tschörtnerite (zeolitic tectosilicate: IMA1995-051) 9.GF.40 [no]
74. Tsepinite (labuntsovite) 9.CE.30b
  1. Tsepinite-Ca (IMA2002-020) 9.CE.30b [no]
  2. Tsepinite-K (IMA2002-005) 9.CE.30b [no]
  3. Tsepinite-Na (IMA2000-046) 9.CE.30b [no]
  4. Tsepinite-Sr (IMA2004-008) 9.CE.30b [no]
75. Tsikourasite (phosphide: IMA2018-156) 1.0 [no] [no]
76. Tsilaisite (tourmaline: IMA2011-047) 9.CK. [no] [no]
77. Tsnigriite (IMA1991-051) 2.LA.55
  (IUPAC: nonasilver antimony tritelluride tri(sulfide,selenide))
78. Tsugaruite (IMA1997-010) 2.JB.30c [no]
  (IUPAC: tetralead heptasulfadiarsenide)
79. Tsumcorite (tsumcorite: IMA1969-047) 8.CG.15
  (IUPAC: lead dizinc diarsenate dihydrate)
80. Tsumebite (brackebuschite: 1912) 8.BG.05
  (IUPAC: dilead copper hydro phosphate sulfate)
81. Tsumgallite ("O(OH)" group: IMA2002-011) 4.FD.10 [no]
  (IUPAC: hydrogallium oxide)
82. Tsumoite (tetradymite: IMA1972-010a) 2.DC.05
  (IUPAC: bismuth telluride)
83. Tsygankoite (IMA2017-088) 2.0 [no] [no]
84. Tubulite (IMA2011-109) 2.JB.35f [no]
  (Ag_{2}Pb_{22}Sb_{20}S_{53})
85. Tučekite (hauchecornite: IMA1975-022) 2.BB.10
  (IUPAC: nonanickel octasulfadiantimonide)
86. Tugarinovite (rutile: IMA1979-072) 4.DB.05
  (IUPAC: molybdenum(IV) oxide)
87. Tugtupite (sodalite: IMA1967 s.p., 1963) 9.FB.10
  (IUPAC: tetrasodium beryllium dodecaoxotetrasilicate chlorine)
88. Tuhualite (tuhualite: 1932) 9.DN.05
  (IUPAC: sodium iron(II) iron(III) pentadecaoxohexasilicate)
89. Tuite (palmierite: IMA2001-070) 8.AC.45 [no]
  (IUPAC: tricalcium diphosphate)
90. Tulameenite (alloy: IMA1972-016) 1.AG.40
  (IUPAC: diplatinum copper iron alloy)
91. Tuliokite (IMA1988-041) 5.CB.50
  (IUPAC: hexasodium barium thorium hexacarbonate hexahydrate)
92. Tululite (IMA2014-065) 4.0 [no] [no]
93. Tumchaite (IMA1999-041) 9.EA.60 [no]
  (IUPAC: disodium zirconium undecaoxotetrasilicate dihydrate)
94. Tundrite 09.AH.10
  (IUPAC: disodium diREE titanium dioxy tetraoxosilicate dicarbonate)
  1. Tundrite-(Ce) (IMA1968 s.p., 1965) 9.AH.10
  2. Tundrite-(Nd) (IMA1987 s.p., 1968) 9.AH.10
95. Tunellite (IMA1967 s.p., 1961) 6.FC.05
  (IUPAC: strontium dihydro nonaoxohexaborate trihydrate)
96. Tungsten (iron: IMA2011-004) 1.AE.05 [no] [no]
97. Tungstenite (molybdenite: 1917) 2.EA.30
  (IUPAC: tungsten disulfide)
98. Tungstibite (IMA1993-059) 4.DE.15
  (IUPAC: diantimony tungsten hexaoxide)
99. Tungstite (Y: 1868) 4.FJ.10
  (IUPAC: tungsten trioxide monohydrate)
100. Tungusite (IMA1966-029) 9.EE.30
101. Tunisite (IMA1967-038) 5.BB.15
  (IUPAC: sodium dicalcium tetraluminium octahydro chloro tetracarbonate)
102. Tuperssuatsiaite (palygorskite: IMA1984-002) 9.EE.20
103. Turanite (Y: 1909) 8.BB.70
  (IUPAC: pentacopper(II) tetrahydro divanadate)
104. Turkestanite (steacyite: IMA1996-036) 9.CH.10 [no]
105. Turneaureite (apatite: IMA1983-063) 8.BN.05
  (IUPAC: pentacalcium chloro triarsenate)
106. Turquoise (turquoise: IMA1967 s.p., old) 8.DD.15
  (IUPAC: copper hexaluminium octahydro tetraphosphate tetrahydrate)
107. Turtmannite (hematolite: IMA2000-007) 8.BE.45 [no]
  (IUPAC: pentaicosamanganese pentaoxotrivanadate tri(tetraoxosilicate) icosahydroxyl)
108. Tuscanite (IMA1976-031) 9.EG.45
109. Tusionite (IMA1982-090) 6.AA.15
  (IUPAC: manganese(II) tin(IV) di(trioxoborate))
110. Tuzlaite (IMA1993-022) 6.EC.25
  (IUPAC: sodium calcium dihydro octaoxopentaborate trihydrate)
111. Tvalchrelidzeite (IMA1974-052) 2.GC.45
  (IUPAC: trimercury antimonide arsenide trisulfide)
112. Tvedalite (zeolitic tectosilicate: IMA1990-027) 9.DF.20
113. Tveitite-(Y) (IMA1975-033) 03.AB.30
114. Tvrdýite (beraunite: IMA2014-082) 8.0 [no] [no]
115. Tweddillite (epidote, clinozoisite: IMA2001-014) 9.BG.05 [no]
  (IUPAC: calcium strontium (dimanganese(III) aluminium) heptaoxodisilicate tetraoxosilicate oxydehydroxyl)
116. Twinnite (sartorite: IMA1966-017) 2.HC.05a
  (Pb(Sb_{0.63}As_{0.37})_{2}S_{4})
117. Tychite (northupite: 1905) 5.BF.05
  (IUPAC: hexasodium dimagnesium tetracarbonate sulfate)
118. Tyretskite (hilgardite: IMA1968 s.p.) 6.ED.05
  (IUPAC: dicalcium hydro nonaoxopentaborate hydrate)
119. Tyrolite (Y: 1845) 8.DM.10
  (IUPAC: dicalcium nonacopper octahydro tetrarsenate carbonate undecahydrate)
120. Tyrrellite (spinel, linnaeite: 1952) 2.DA.05
  (IUPAC: copper di(cobalt,nickel) tetraselenide)
121. Tyuyamunite (Y: 1912) 4.HB.25
  (IUPAC: calcium diuranyl divanadate (5-8)hydrate)
