= List of minerals recognized by the International Mineralogical Association (I) =

This list includes those recognised minerals beginning with the letter I. The International Mineralogical Association is the international group that recognises new minerals and new mineral names; however, minerals discovered before 1959 did not go through the official naming procedure, although some minerals published previously have been either confirmed or discredited since that date. This list contains a mixture of mineral names that have been approved since 1959 and those mineral names believed to still refer to valid mineral species (these are called "grandfathered" species).

The list is divided into groups:

- Introduction • (Main synonyms)
- A • B • C • D • E • F • G • H • I • J • K • L • M • N • O • P–Q • R • S • T • U–V • W–X • Y–Z

The data was exported from mindat.org on 29 April 2005; updated up to 'IMA2021'.

The minerals are sorted by name, followed by the structural group (rruff.info/ima and ima-cnmnc by mineralienatlas.de, mainly) or chemical class (mindat.org and basics), the year of publication (if it's before of an IMA approval procedure), the IMA approval and the Strunz-mindat code. The first link is to mindat.org, the second link is to webmineral.com, and the third is to the Handbook of Mineralogy (Mineralogical Society of America).

- Abbreviations:
  - ^{D} – discredited (IMA/CNMNC status).
  - ^{Q} – questionable/ doubtful (IMA/CNMNC, mindat.org or mineralienatlas.de status).
  - ^{N} – published without approval of the IMA/CNMNC, or just not an IMA approved mineral but with some acceptance in the scientific community nowadays.
  - ^{I} – intermediate member of a solid-solution series.
  - ^{H} – hypothetical mineral (synthetic, anthropogenic, suspended approval procedure, etc.)
    - ^{ch} – incomplete description, hypothetical solid solution end member.
  - Rd – redefinition of ...
  - "s.p." – special procedure.
  - group – a name used to designate a group of species, sometimes only a mineral group name.
  - no – no link available.
  - IUPAC – chemical name.
  - Y: NNNN – year of publication.
  - Y: old – known before publications were available.

== I ==
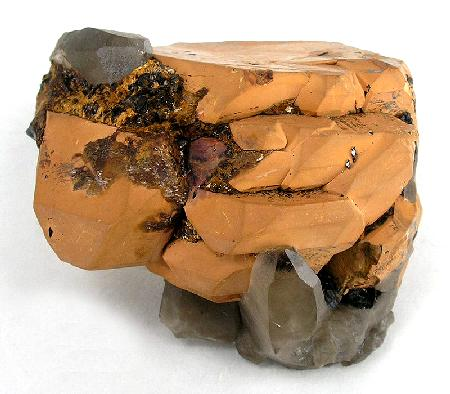
Ilmenite on smoky quartz

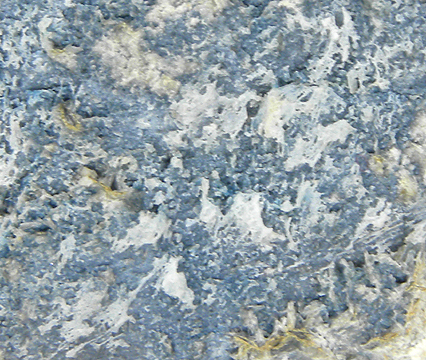
Blue ilsemannite from Mogul Tunnel Occurrence, Tungsten District, Boulder County, Colorado, US

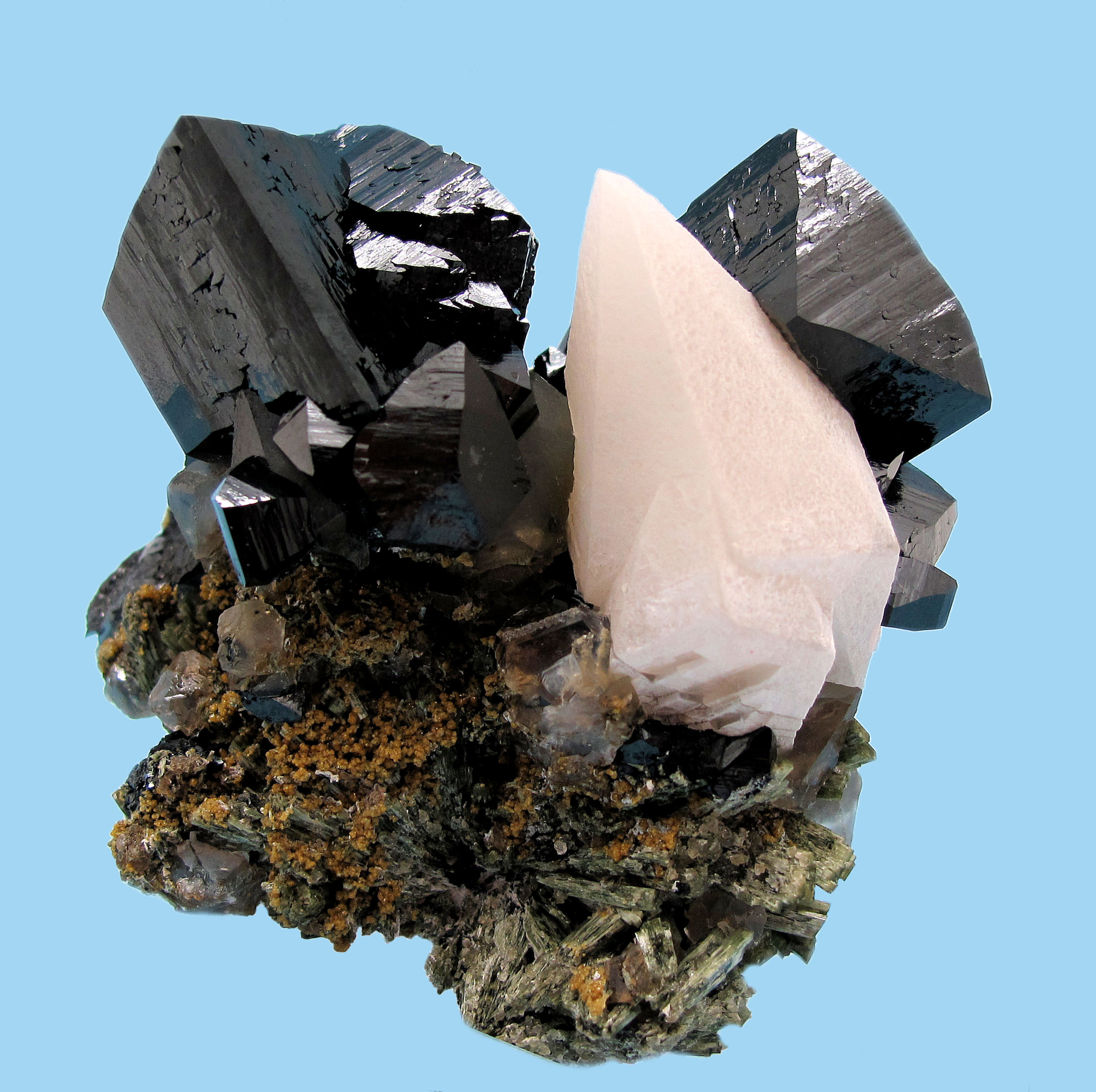
Ilvaite crystals with a colorless translucent calcite scalenohedron perched on them, on a matrix made up of actinolite crystals with minor quartz and andradite

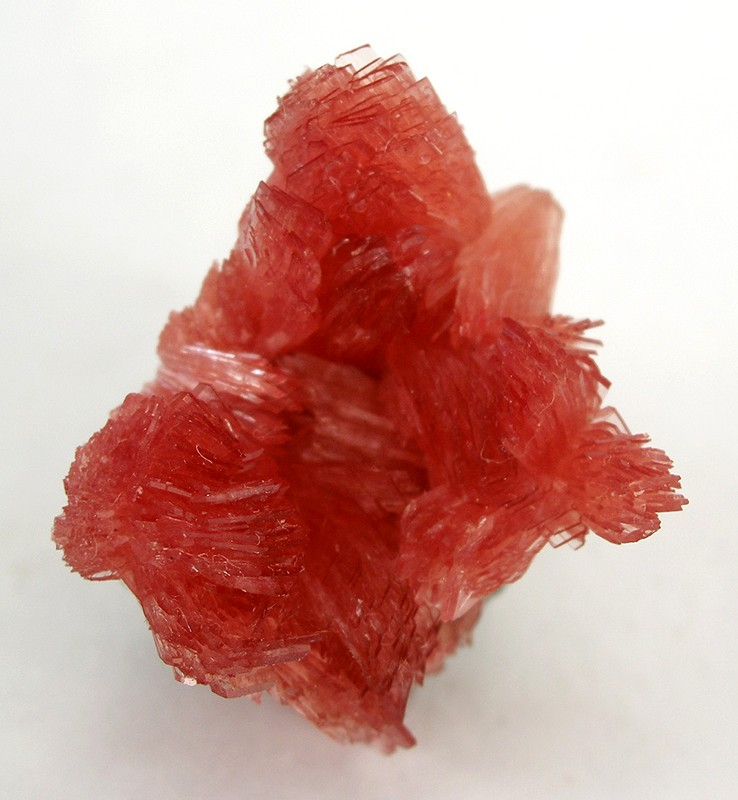
Inesite from Wessels Mine, Kalahari manganese fields, Northern Cape Province, South Africa; size 3 × 2.5 × 2 cm

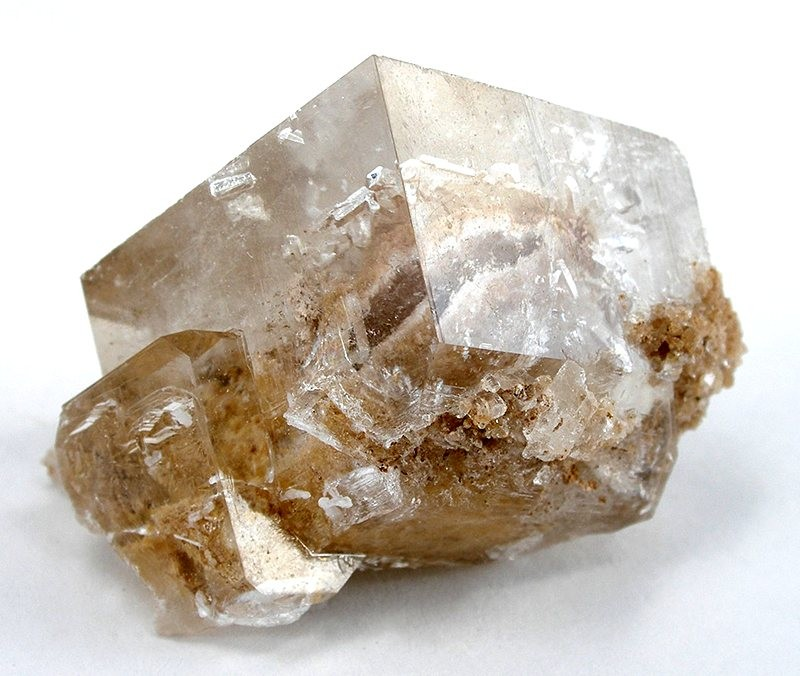
Inyoite from Monte Azul deposit, Sijes, Salta, Argentina

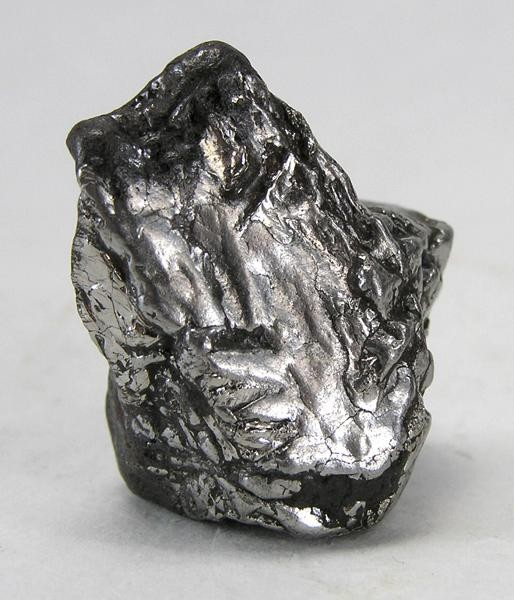
Meteoric iron var. kamacite, with about 7% nickel. Nandan iron meteorites, Nandan County, Guangxi Zhuang Autonomous Region, China; size: 2.9 × 2.4 × 1.7 cm

1. Ianbruceite (IMA2011-049) 8.DA.50 [no] [no]
2. Iangreyite (IMA2009-087) 8.DE.45 [no]
3. Ianthinite (Y: 1926) 4.GA.10
  (IUPAC: diuranium(IV) tetrauranyl tetrahydro hexaoxide nonahydrate)
4. Ice (Ice I_{h}) (Y: old) 4.AA.05
  1. Ice-VII (IMA2017-029) 4.AA. [no] [no]
5. Ichnusaite (IMA2013-087) 7.0 [no] [no]
  (IUPAC: thorium dimolybdate trihydrate)
6. Icosahedrite (quasicrystal: IMA2010-042) 1.0 [no] [no]
  (Al_{63}Cu_{24}Fe_{13})
7. Idaite (stannite: 1959) 2.CB.15a
  (IUPAC: tricopper iron tetrasulfide)
8. Idrialite (Y: 1832) 10.BA.20
9. Igelströmite (IMA2021-035) 4.BC. [no] [no]
10. Iimoriite-(Y) (IMA1967-033) 9.AH.05
  (IUPAC: diyttrium tetraoxosilicate carbonate)
11. Ikaite (IMA1962-005) 5.CB.25
  (IUPAC: calcium carbonate hexahydrate)
12. Ikranite (eudialyte: IMA2000-010) 9.CO.10 [no]
13. Ikunolite (tetradymite: IMA1962 s.p., 1959) 2.DC.05
  (IUPAC: tetrabismuth trisulfide)
14. Ilesite (starkeyite: 1881) 7.CB.15
  (IUPAC: manganese(II) sulfate tetrahydrate)
15. Ilímaussite-(Ce) (IMA1965-025) 9.CB.15
16. Ilinskite (selenite: IMA1996-027) 4.JG.20
  (IUPAC: sodium pentacopper trichloro dioxodiselenite)
17. Ilirneyite (zemannite: IMA2015-046) 4.0 [no] [no]
18. (Illite, mica series)
19. Illoqite-(Ce) (nordite: IMA2021-021) 9.DO. [no] [no]
20. Ilmajokite-(Ce) (IMA1971-027) 9.HB.05
21. Ilmenite (corundum: 1827) 4.CB.05
  (IUPAC: iron(II) titanium(IV) trioxide)
22. Ilsemannite^{Q} (Y: 1871) 4.FJ.15
23. Iltisite (IMA1994-031) 2.FC.20b [no]
  (IUPAC: mercury silver chloro sulfide)
24. Ilvaite (Y: 1811) 9.BE.07
  (IUPAC: calcium iron(II) diron(III) oxoheptaoxodisilicate hydroxyl)
25. Ilyukhinite (eudialyte: IMA2015-065) 9.C?. [no] [no]
26. Imandrite (lovozerite: IMA1979-025) 9.CJ.15b
27. Imayoshiite (ettringite: IMA2013-069) 6.0 [no] [no]
  (IUPAC: tricalcium aluminium carbonate hexahydro [tetrahydroborate] dodecahydrate)
28. Imhofite (IMA1971 s.p., 1965) 2.HD.30
  (Tl_{5.8}As1_{5.4}S_{26})
29. Imiterite (IMA1983-038) 2.BD.05
  (IUPAC: disilver mercury disulfide)
30. Imogolite (allophane: IMA1987 s.p., 1962 Rd) 9.ED.20
  (IUPAC: dialuminium trioxosilicate tetrahydroxyl)
31. Inaglyite (IMA1983-054) 2.DA.20
  (IUPAC: lead tricopper octairidium hexadecasulfide)
32. Incomsartorite (sartorite: IMA2016-035) 2.0 [no] [no]
33. Inderborite (Y: 1941) 06.CA.25
34. Inderite (IMA1962 s.p., 1937) 6.CA.15
  (IUPAC: magnesium pentahydro trioxotriborate pentahydrate)
35. Indialite (beryl: 1954) 9.CJ.05
  (IUPAC: dimagnesium trialuminium (aluminopentasilicate) octadecaoxy)
36. Indigirite (IMA1971-012) 5.DA.10
  (IUPAC: dimagnesium dialuminium dihydro tetracarbonate pentadecahydrate)
37. Indite (spinel, linnaeite: IMA1967 s.p., 1963) 2.DA.05
  (IUPAC: iron diindium tetrasulfide)
38. Indium (element: IMA1968 s.p., 1964) 1.AC.05
39. Inesite (Y: 1887) 9.DL.05
40. Ingersonite (IMA1986-021) 4.DH.40
  (IUPAC: tricalcium manganese(II) tetraantimony(V) tetradecaoxide)
41. Ingodite (tetradymite: IMA1980-045) 2.DC.05
  (IUPAC: dibismuth telluride sulfide)
42. Innelite (seidozerite, lamprophyllite: IMA1962 s.p.) 9.BE.40
43. Innsbruckite (IMA2013-038) 9.0 [no] [no]
44. Insizwaite (pyrite: IMA1971-031) 2.EB.05a
  (IUPAC: platinum dibismuthide)
45. Intersilite (IMA1995-033) 9.EE.60 [no]
46. Inyoite (Y: 1914) 6.CA.35
  (IUPAC: calcium pentahydro trioxotriborate tetrahydrate)
47. Iodargyrite (wurtzite: IMA1962 s.p., 1825) 3.AA.10
  (IUPAC: silver iodide)
48. Iowaite (hydrotalcite: IMA1967-002) 4.FL.05
  (IUPAC: hexamagnesium diiron(III) dichloro hexadecahydroxide dihydrate)
49. Iquiqueite (IMA1984-019) 6.H0.20
50. Iranite (iranite: IMA1980 s.p., 1963) 7.FC.15
51. Iraqite-(La) (steacyite: IMA1973-041) 9.CH.10
52. Irarsite (pyrite: IMA1966-028) 2.EB.25
  (IUPAC: iridium sulfarsenide)
53. Irhtemite (IMA1971-034) 8.CB.55
54. Iridarsenite (IMA1973-021) 2.AC.45b
  (IUPAC: iridium diarsenide)
55. Iridium (element: IMA1991 s.p., 1804 Rd) 1.AF.10
56. Iriginite (Y: 1957) 4.GB.60
  (IUPAC: uranyl dimolybdenum(VI) heptaoxide trihydrate)
57. Irinarassite (garnet: IMA2010-073) 9.A?. [no] [no]
58. Iron (iron: old) 1.AE.05
59. Irtyshite (IMA1984-025) 4.DJ.05
  (IUPAC: disodium tetratantalum undecaoxide)
60. Iseite (nolanite: IMA2012-020) 4.CB.40 [no]
  (IUPAC: dimanganese trimolybdenum octaoxide)
61. Ishiharaite (sphalerite: IMA2013-119) 2.0 [no] [no]
  ((Cu,Ga,Fe,In,Zn)S)
62. Ishikawaite (Y: 1922) 4.DB.25
63. Isoclasite^{Q} (Y: 1870) 8.DN.10 [no] [no]
  (IUPAC: dicalcium hydro phosphate dihydrate)
64. Isocubanite (sphalerite: IMA1983-E) 2.CB.55b
  (IUPAC: copper diiron trisulfide)
65. Isoferroplatinum (auricupride: IMA1974-012a) 1.AG.35
  (IUPAC: triplatinum iron alloy)
66. Isokite (titanite: 1955) 8.BH.10
  (IUPAC: calcium magnesium fluoro phosphate)
67. Isolueshite (oxide perovskite: IMA1995-024) 4.CC.35
  (IUPAC: sodium niobium trioxide)
68. Isomertieite (IMA1973-057) 2.AC.15a
  (IUPAC: undecapalladium diantimonide diarsenide)
69. Isovite (carbide: IMA1996-039) 1.BA.10 [no]
  (IUPAC: tricosa(chromium,iron) hexacarbide)
70. Isselite (IMA2018-139) 7.0 [no] [no]
71. Itelmenite (IMA2015-047) 7.0 [no] [no]
  (IUPAC: tetrasodium trimagnesium tricopper octasulfate)
72. Itoigawaite (lawsonite: IMA1998-034) 9.BE.05 [no]
73. Itoite (IMA1962 s.p.) 7.BD.50
  (IUPAC: trilead germanium dihydro dioxodisulfate)
74. Itsiite (hyalotekite: IMA2013-085) 9.0 [no]
  (IUPAC: dibarium calcium di(boroheptaoxodisilicate))
75. Ivanyukite series 9.0 [Ti_{4}O_{2}(OH)_{2}(SiO_{4})_{3}], pharmacosiderite structural group
  1. Ivanyukite-Cu (IMA2007-043) 9.0 [no]
  2. Ivanyukite-K (IMA2007-042) 9.0 [no]
  3. Ivanyukite-Na (IMA2007-041) 9.0 [no]
76. Ivsite (IMA2013-138) 7.0 [no] [no]
  (IUPAC: trisodium hydrogen disulfate)
77. Iwakiite (IMA1974-049) 4.BB.10
  (IUPAC: manganese(II) diiron(III) tetraoxide)
78. Iwashiroite-(Y) (IMA2003-053) 7.GA.10
  (IUPAC: yttrium tetraoxotantalate)
79. Iwateite (aphthitalite: IMA2013-034) 8.0 [no]
  (IUPAC: disodium barium manganese diphosphate)
80. Ixiolite (columbite: IMA1962 s.p., 1857 Rd) 4.DB.25
81. Iyoite (atacamite: IMA2013-130) 3.0 [no] [no]
  (IUPAC: manganese copper trihydro chloride)
82. Izoklakeite (kobellite: IMA1983-065) 2.HB.10b
  (Pb_{26.4}(Cu,Fe)_{2}(Sb,Bi)_{19.6}S_{57})
