= Tlapallite =

Rare and complex tellurate mineral

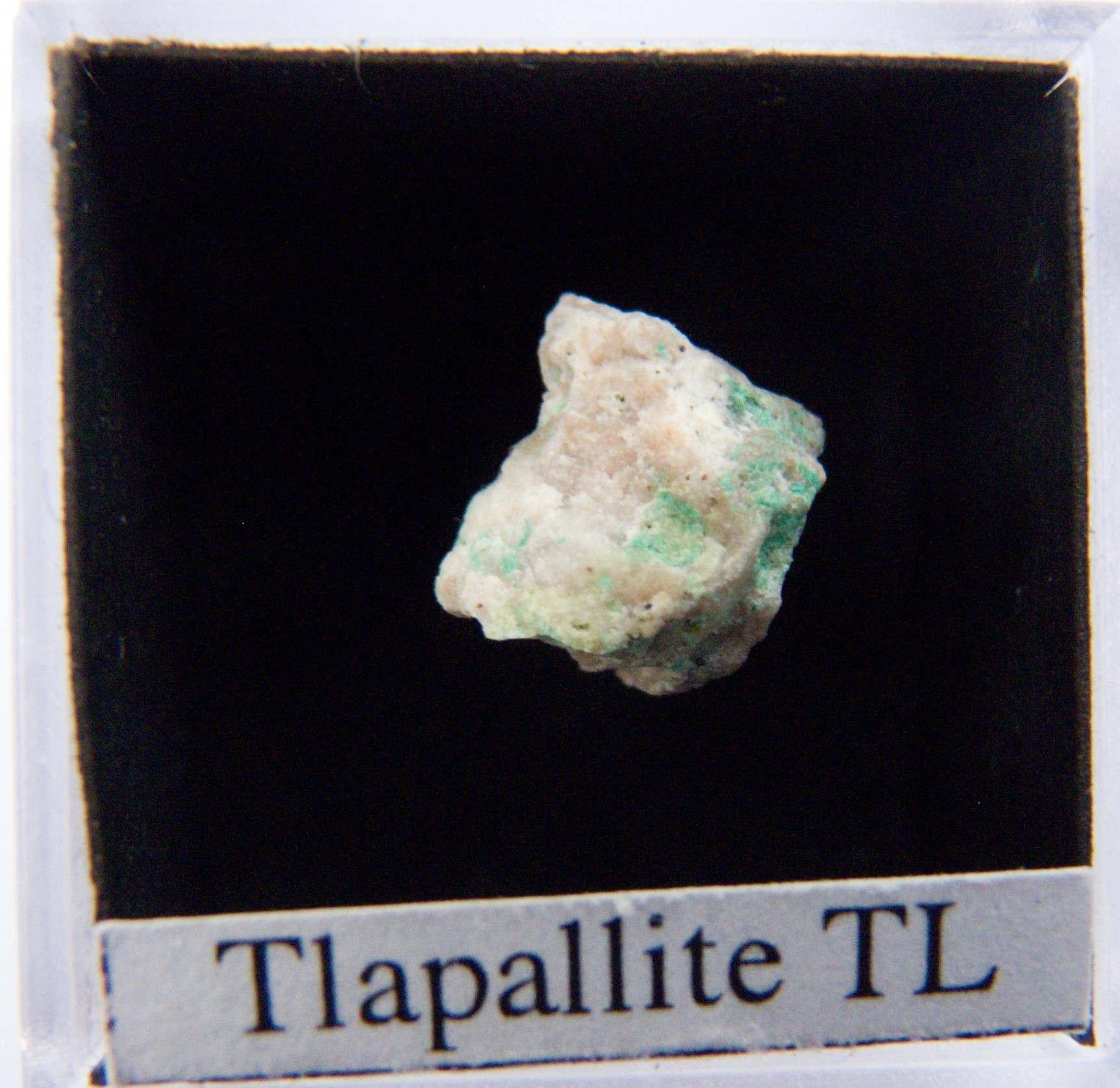
- Tlapallite on matrix from Bambollita mine (La Oriental), Moctezuma, Municipio de Moctezuma, Sonora, Mexico. Picture width: 29 mm

General
- Category: Tellurate minerals
- Formula: (Ca,Pb)_{3}CaCu_{6}[Te^{4+}_{3}Te^{6+}O_{12}]_{2}(Te^{4+}O_{3})_{2}(SO_{4})_{2}·3H_{2}O
- IMA symbol: Tpl
- Strunz classification: 4.JL.25
- Dana classification: 34.8.2.1
- Crystal system: Monoclinic; P3 2 1
- Unit cell: a = 11.97 Å, b = 9.11 Å c = 15.66 Å; Z = 4

Identification
- Color: Green
- Crystal habit: Thin crusts or botryoidal aggregates
- Cleavage: None
- Mohs scale hardness: 3
- Luster: Vitreous, Waxy
- Streak: Pale green
- Diaphaneity: Translucent
- Specific gravity: 5.38 (measured) 5.05–5.465 (calculated)
- Optical properties: Biaxial (−)
- Refractive index: n_{α} = 1.815 – 1.915 n_{β} = 1.960 – 2.115 n_{γ} = 1.960 – 2.115
- Birefringence: δ = 0.1450–0.2000
- Pleochroism: Moderate, different shades of green
- 2V angle: 0
- Ultraviolet fluorescence: None
- Fusibility: Fuses readily
- Diagnostic features: Thin green paint-like crusts
- Solubility: Soluble in cold HCl; Slightly soluble in HNO_{3} unless heated

Tlapallite is a rare and complex tellurate mineral with the chemical formula (Ca,Pb)_{3}CaCu_{6}[Te^{4+}_{3}Te^{6+}O_{12}]_{2}(Te^{4+}O_{3})_{2}(SO_{4})_{2}·3H_{2}O. It has a Moh's hardness of 3 and it is green in colour. It was named after the Nahua word "Tlalpalli", which translates to paint, referring to the paint-like habit of the mineral. Its formula and crystal structure were redefined in 2019, showing it contained a mixed-valence phyllotellurate layer [Te^{4+}_{3}Te^{6+}O_{12}]^{12−}.

== Occurrence ==
It was discovered in 1972 the Bambollita mine (La Oriental), Moctezuma, Municipio de Moctezuma, Sonora, Mexico, a mine known for its tellurium deposits, and it was approved by the IMA in 1977. Here, it is found as thin paint-like crusts on rock fractures and next to thin veins running through rhyolite. It is often found as a thin film on quartz, sericite, calcite or baryte, but it also forms botryoidal aggregates. It is often found alone, but may be associated with other minerals, especially carlfriesite. It has also been found in the emerald mine in Tombstone District, Cochise County, Arizona in the United States.

The habit of the mineral suggests it precipitates from rapidly drying acid solutions. It seems to form in the transitory phase when other tellurium minerals, like tlalocite, cesbronite, xocomecatlite, quetzalcoatlite, teineite and carlfriesite, start to break down.

== See also ==
- List of minerals
