= Khinite =

Rare orthotellurate mineral

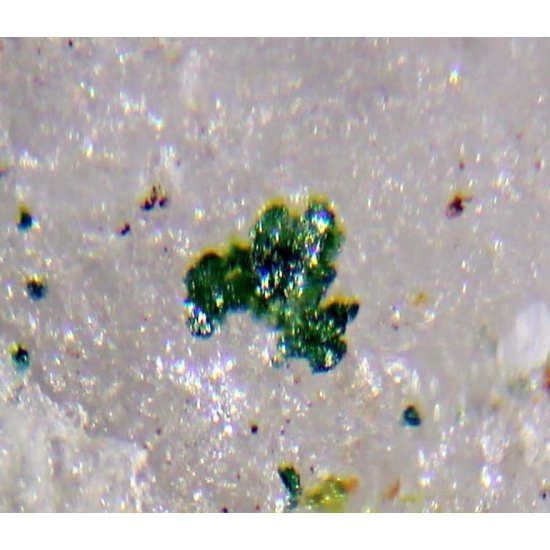
- Dark green Khinite crystals from the type locality (Bird Nest Drift, San Bernardino County, California, United States of America).

General
- Category: Tellurate minerals
- Formula: PbCu_{3}TeO_{6}(OH)_{2}
- IMA symbol: Khn
- Strunz classification: 4.FD.30
- Dana classification: 33.1.3.1
- Crystal system: Orthorhombic
- Unit cell: Khinite-4O: a = 5.740 Å, b = 9.983 Å, c = 23.960 Å, Z = 8 Khinite-3T (parakhinite): a = 5.753 Å, c = 17.958 Å, Z = 3

Identification
- Color: Dark green – Bottle green
- Crystal habit: Dipyramidal or curved crystals
- Cleavage: {001} fair
- Tenacity: Brittle
- Mohs scale hardness: 3.5
- Luster: Vitreous
- Streak: Green
- Diaphaneity: Semitransparent
- Specific gravity: 6.5–7.0 (measured) 6.69 (calculated)
- Optical properties: Biaxial (+) (khinite) Uniaxial (−) (parakhinite)
- Birefringence: δ = 0.055
- Pleochroism: Yellow green – emerald green
- 2V angle: 20^{o}
- Ultraviolet fluorescence: None
- Fusibility: Fuses readily to a brown slag
- Solubility: Soluble in cold acids
- Common impurities: Ca

Khinite is a rare orthotellurate mineral with the formula Pb^{2+}Cu^{2+}_{3}TeO_{6}(OH)_{2}. It crystallizes in the orthorhombic system and has a bottle-green colour. It is often found as dipyramidal, curved or corroded crystals no more than 0.15 mm in size. The tetragonal dimorph of khinite is called parakhinite.

== Occurrence and name ==
Both khinite and parakhinite were first identified in 1978 in the Old Guard Mine (Royal Guard Mine), Tombstone District, Cochise County, Arizona, US They were named after Ba-Saw Khin, a Burmese-American mineralogist. They are often found together with tenorite, quetzalcoatlite, quartz, gold, dugganite, chrysocolla, chlorargyrite, bromargyrite, xocomecatlite, and tlapallite. Khinite and parakhinite are found in multiple mines across Mexico and the USA.

== Parakhinite ==
Parakhinite crystallizes in the tetragonal system. Khinite and parakhinite are also called khinite-4O and khinite-3T, respectively. Khinite and parakhinite are identical in colour and many other properties, like reactivity. They do differ in optical properties: Khinite is biaxial (+), while parakhinite is uniaxial (−). They also have different unit cells.
