= Tancaite-(Ce) =

General
- Category: Molybdate mineral
- Formula: FeCe(MoO_{4})_{3}•3H_{2}O
- IMA symbol: Tca-Ce
- Strunz classification: 7.GB.50
- Crystal system: Trigonal
- Crystal class: Rhombohedral (3̅); H-M symbol: (3̅)
- Space group: R3̅
- Unit cell: a = 19.290, c = 47.251 [Å]

Identification

Tancaite-(Ce) is a very rare molybdate mineral with the formula FeCe(MoO_{4})_{3}•3H_{2}O. It was found in Punta de Su Seinargiu locality on Sardinia, Italy. Red crystals of tancaite-(Ce) resemble modified cubes, but the mineral is trigonal (space group R-3). The type locality of tancaite-(Ce) is also a place of discovery of other molybdate minerals, including thorium molybdates ichnusaite and nuragheite.
