= Cesbronite =

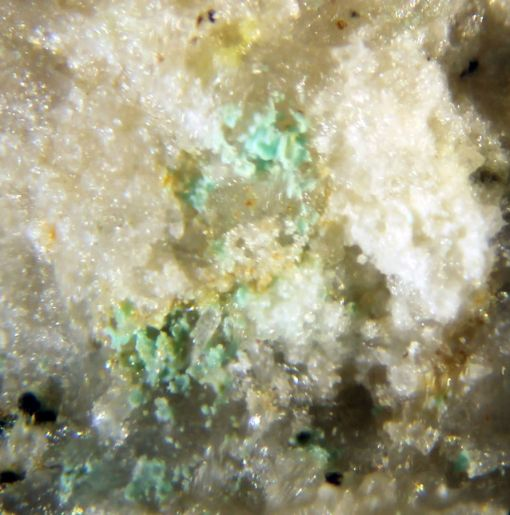
- Emerald green crystal aggregates of cesbronite from Tombstone District, Cochise County, Arizona, USA

General
- Category: Copper-tellurium oxysalt
- Formula: Cu_{3}Te^{6+}O_{4}(OH)_{4}
- IMA symbol: Ces
- Strunz classification: 4.JN.15
- Dana classification: 34.7.2.1
- Crystal system: Orthorhombic
- Crystal class: Dipyramidal (mmm); H-M symbol: (2/m 2/m 2/m)
- Space group: Pbcn
- Unit cell: a = 8.624, b = 11.878 c = 5.872 [Å], Z = 2

Identification
- Color: Green
- Cleavage: poor on {010}, good on {021}
- Tenacity: Brittle
- Mohs scale hardness: 3
- Luster: Subadamantine
- Streak: Green
- Diaphaneity: Translucent
- Specific gravity: 4.45 (measured)
- Optical properties: Biaxial (+)
- Birefringence: δ = 0.149
- Pleochroism: Distinct, various shades of green
- 2V angle: 72^{o} (calculated)
- Ultraviolet fluorescence: None
- Solubility: Soluble in HCl and HNO_{3}. Insoluble in water

Cesbronite is a copper-meteatellurate oxysalt mineral with the chemical formula Cu_{3}Te^{6+}O_{4}(OH)_{4} (IMA 17-C). It is colored green and its crystals are orthorhombic dipyramidal. Cesbronite is rated 3 on the Mohs Scale. It is named after Fabien Cesbron (born 1938), a French mineralogist.

== Occurrence ==
It was first found in the Bambollita ("La Oriental") mine in the Mexican state of Sonora. It also occurs in the Tombstone District of Cochise County, Arizona and the Tintic District of the East Tintic Mountains, Juab County, Utah. It is often associated with argentian gold, teineite, carlfriesite, xocomecatlite, utahite, leisingite, jensenite and hematite.

== See also ==
- List of minerals named after people
- List of minerals
