= Misakiite =

Mineral

General
- Category: Atacamite group
- Formula: Cu_{3}Mn(OH)_{6}Cl_{2}
- IMA symbol: Msk
- Strunz classification: 3.DA.10c
- Crystal system: Trigonal

Identification
- Color: emerald green
- Luster: vitreous
- Specific gravity: 3.42 g/cm3 (calculated)

Misakiite is a halide mineral from the Atacamite group bearing copper and manganese. It is closely related to Iyoite. The mineral species was approved by the IMA in 2013, a description was published in 2017 based on samples from the Sadamisaki Peninsula, after whose colloquial name Misaki, the mineral was named.
