= Utahite =

Extremely rare secondary copper zinc tellurate mineral

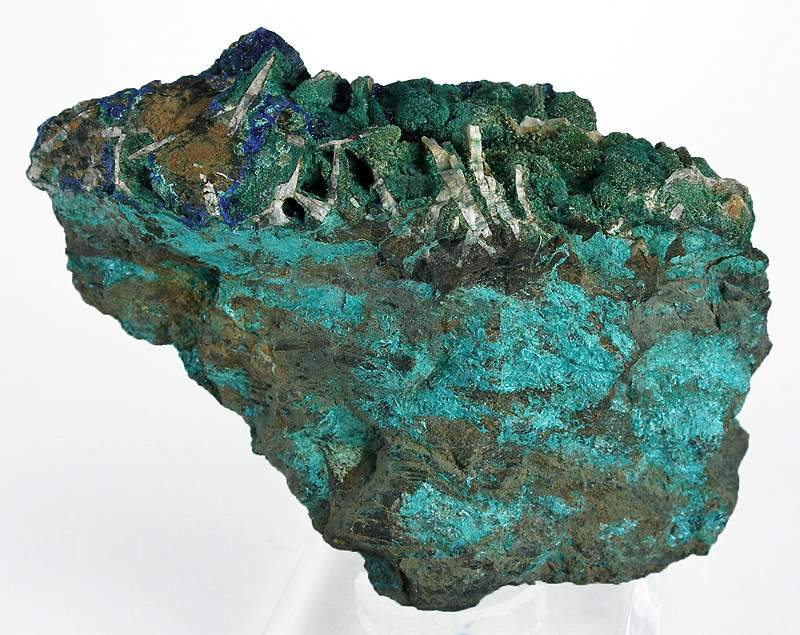
- Utahite and jarosite

General
- Category: Tellurate minerals
- Formula: Cu_{5}Zn_{3}(Te^{6+}O_{4})_{4}(OH)_{8}·7H_{2}O
- IMA symbol: Uta
- Strunz classification: 7.DE.25
- Crystal system: Triclinic; Unknown space group
- Unit cell: a = 8.794 Å, b = 9.996 Å c = 5.66 Å; α = 104.1° β = 90.066°, γ = 96.3333°; Z = 1

Identification
- Formula mass: 1,542.46 g/mol
- Color: Pale blue, greenish blue
- Crystal habit: Prismatic thin tabular to bladed crystals; as sheaves and bow tielike clusters
- Cleavage: none
- Fracture: Brittle – uneven
- Mohs scale hardness: 4–5
- Luster: Vitreous to pearly
- Streak: Pale blue
- Diaphaneity: Translucent
- Specific gravity: 5.33
- Optical properties: Biaxial
- Refractive index: n_{α} = 1.830 – 1.840 n_{β} = 1.830 – 1.900 n_{γ} = 1.880 – 1.900
- Birefringence: δ = 0.050 – 0.060
- Dispersion: Strong

Utahite is an extremely rare secondary copper zinc tellurate mineral found as a product of oxidation. Its chemical formula is Cu_{5}Zn_{3}(Te^{6+}O_{4})_{4}(OH)_{8}·7H_{2}O.

It was first described in 1997 for an occurrence in the Centennial Eureka mine, one mile southeast of Eureka, Tintic District, Juab County, Utah, US (type locality). The discovery site was a mine dump of a hydrothermal ore deposit where it occurs with cesbronite and quartz. It has also been reported from the Empire Mine in the Tombstone District of Cochise County, Arizona.
