= Carlfriesite =

Tellurium mineral

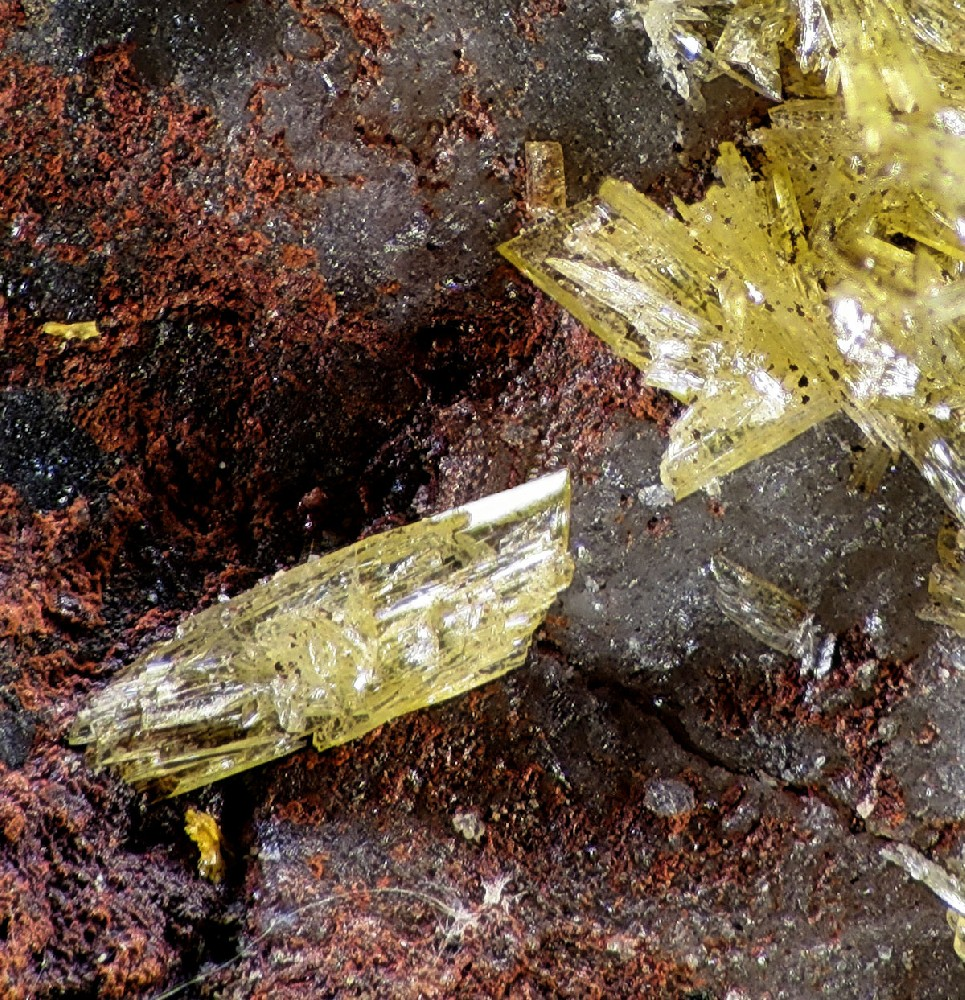
- Carlfriesite from Moctezuma Mine, Moctezuma, Municipio de Moctezuma, Sonora, Mexico. Picture width: 2 mm.

General
- Category: Tellurate minerals
- Formula: CaTe^{4+}_{2}Te^{6+}O_{8}
- IMA symbol: Clf
- Strunz classification: 4.JK.25
- Dana classification: 34.5.3.1
- Crystal system: Monoclinic
- Crystal class: Prismatic (2/m) (same H-M symbol)
- Space group: C2/c
- Unit cell: a = 12.576, b = 5.662 c = 9.994 [Å], Z = 4

Identification
- Color: Bright yellow – buttery yellow
- Crystal habit: Axe-head shaped crystals, botryoidal crusts or radial crystals.
- Cleavage: Distinct
- Tenacity: Brittle
- Mohs scale hardness: 3.5
- Luster: Vitreous
- Streak: Pale yellow
- Diaphaneity: Transparent
- Specific gravity: 6.3 (measured) 5.7 (calculated)
- Optical properties: Biaxial (−)
- Birefringence: δ = 0.208
- Pleochroism: Weak, shades of yellow
- 2V angle: 80
- Ultraviolet fluorescence: None
- Solubility: Insoluble

Carlfriesite is a rare tellurium mineral with the formula CaTe^{4+}_{2}Te^{6+}O_{8}, or more simplified: CaTe_{3}O_{8}. It has a Moh's hardness of 3.5 and it occurs in various shades of yellow, ranging from bright yellow to a light buttery color. It was named after Carl Fries Jr. (1910–1965) from the U.S. Geological Survey and the Geological Institute of the National University, Mexico City, Mexico. It was previously thought to have the chemical formula H_{4}Ca(TeO_{3})_{3}, but this was later refined.

== Occurrence ==
Carlfriesite is often found in cavities in hydrothermal gold-tellurium deposits. It is found associated with cerussite, chlorargyrite, argentian gold, cesbronite, calcite, dickite, baryte, bornite, galena, hessite and tlapallite. It was first identified in the Bambollita (La Oriental), Moctezuma, Municipio de Moctezuma, Sonora, Mexico. It is also found in another nearby mine, namely the Moctezuma mine.

== Synthesis ==
Carlfriesite was found to be synthesizable by heating a mixture of CaO, Te(OH)_{6} and TeO_{2} to 150–240°C with water at the vapor pressure of the system. The resulting material was very fine-grained and colorless, consisting of aggregates of tiny carlfriesite plates. The material mostly consisted of carlfriesite, but also contained 10–15% paratellurite, as determined by X-ray diffraction.

== See also ==
- List of minerals
- List of minerals named after people
