= Nuragheite =

General
- Category: Molybdate minerals
- Formula: Th(MoO_{4})_{2}·H_{2}O
- IMA symbol: Nur
- Crystal system: Monoclinic
- Crystal class: Prismatic (2/m) (same H-M symbol)
- Space group: P2_{1}/c
- Unit cell: a = 7.36, b = 10.54 c = 9.49 [Å], β=91.88° (approximated)

Identification
- Color: Colorless
- Crystal habit: Thin tablets
- Cleavage: {100}, perfect
- Tenacity: Brittle
- Luster: Pearly adamantine
- Streak: White
- Specific gravity: 5.15 (calc., approximated)
- Other characteristics: Radioactive

Nuragheite is a rare natural thorium molybdate, formula Th(MoO_{4})_{2}·H_{2}O, discovered in Su Seinargiu, Sarroch, Cagliari, Sardegna, Italy. This locality is also a place of discovery of the other thorium molybdate - ichnusaite, which is a trihydrate.

== Occurrence and association ==
Nuragheite is a part of molybdenum-bismuth mineralization. It coexists with ichnusaite, muscovite, and xenotime-(Y).

== Notes on chemistry ==
Nuragheite is chemically pure.

== Crystal structure ==
The crystal structure of nuragheite is composed of (100) layers with ^{IX}Th-centered polyhedra and Mo-centered tetrahedra. It is thus similar to that of ichnusaite.
