= Tungstite =

Hydroxide mineral

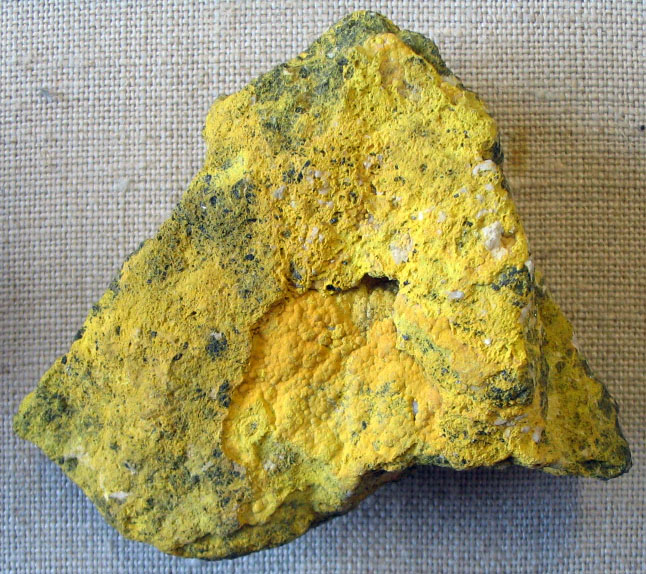
- Bright yellow tungstite on ferberite

General
- Category: Minerals
- Formula: WO_{3}·H_{2}O
- IMA symbol: Tgs
- Strunz classification: 4.FJ.10
- Crystal system: Orthorhombic
- Crystal class: Dipyramidal (mmm); H-M symbol: (2/m 2/m 2/m)
- Space group: Pmnb

Identification
- Formula mass: 249.86 g/mol
- Color: Yellow, yellowish green/orange
- Crystal habit: Earthy, pulverulent
- Cleavage: Perfect along [001], imperfect along [110]
- Mohs scale hardness: 2.5
- Luster: Resinous, pearly
- Streak: Yellow
- Diaphaneity: Transparent
- Specific gravity: 5.517
- Optical properties: Biaxial (-)
- Refractive index: n_{α} = 2.090, n_{β} = 2.240, n_{γ} = 2.260
- Birefringence: δ = 0.170
- Dispersion: r < v (strong)

Tungstite is a hydrous tungsten oxide mineral with formula: WO_{3}·H_{2}O. It is a secondary mineral formed by the weathering of other tungsten containing minerals. It crystallizes in the orthorhombic system in translucent yellow to yellow green masses. It is clay-like with Mohs hardness of 2.5 and a specific gravity of 5.5.

It was first described in 1868 for an occurrence near Trumbull, Connecticut at the Hubbard Tungsten Mine at Long Hill.
