= Quetzalcoatlite =

Rare tellurium oxysalt mineral

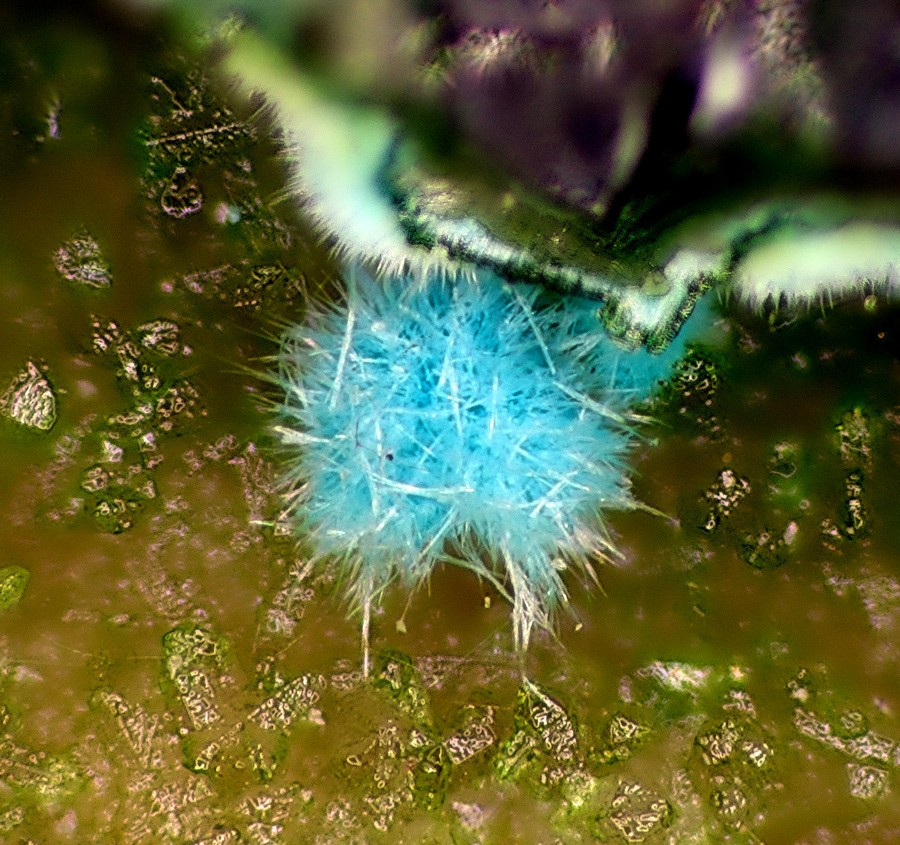
- Blue quetzalcoatlite on quartz from the Bambollita Mine (Oriental Mine), Moctezuma, Mun. de Moctezuma, Sonora, Mexico. Picture width 2 mm.

General
- Category: Oxide minerals
- Formula: Zn_{6}Cu_{3}(TeO_{6})_{2}(OH)_{6}·Ag_{x}Pb_{y}Cl_{x+2y}
- IMA symbol: Qzl
- Strunz classification: 4.FE.45
- Dana classification: 34.6.3.1
- Crystal system: Trigonal
- Crystal class: Hexagonal scalenohedral (3̅m); H-M symbol: (3̅ 2/m)
- Space group: P3̅m1

Identification
- Color: Blue, green in transmitted light
- Crystal habit: needle-like hexagonal crystals, crystalline crusts, sprays
- Cleavage: Fair on {1010}
- Fracture: Brittle
- Tenacity: Brittle
- Mohs scale hardness: 3
- Luster: Pearly, dull
- Streak: Pale blue, almost white
- Diaphaneity: Transparent
- Specific gravity: 6.05 (measured)
- Optical properties: Uniaxial (−)
- Birefringence: δ = 0.062
- Pleochroism: blue-green
- Ultraviolet fluorescence: None
- Solubility: Insoluble in water, soluble in cold HCl and cold HNO_{3}. Decomposes in KOH when heated

Quetzalcoatlite is a rare tellurium oxysalt mineral with the formula Zn_{6}Cu_{3}(TeO_{6})_{2}(OH)_{6} · Ag_{x}Pb_{y}Cl_{x+2y}. It contains large amounts of silver- and lead(II)chloride with the formula Ag_{x}Pb_{y}Cl_{x+2y} (x+y≤2). It has a Mohs hardness of 3 and it crystallizes in the trigonal system. It has a deep blue color. It was named after Quetzalcoatl, the Aztec and Toltec god of the sea, alluding to its color. It is not to be confused with tlalocite, which has a similar color and habit.

== Occurrence ==
Quetzalcoatlite was first identified in the Bambollita mine (La Oriental), Moctezuma, Municipio de Moctezuma, Sonora, Mexico. It was later also found in another nearby mine, the Moctezuma mine, and it has also been found in mines in Arizona, Utah and California. It occurs as a rare mineral in the oxidized zone of tellurium-bearing hydrothermal deposits and it is often associated with hessite, galena, bornite, cerussite, azurite, chlorargyrite, teineite, quartz, baryte, khinite, dugganite, and gold.
