= Ilsemannite =

Grandfathered mineral

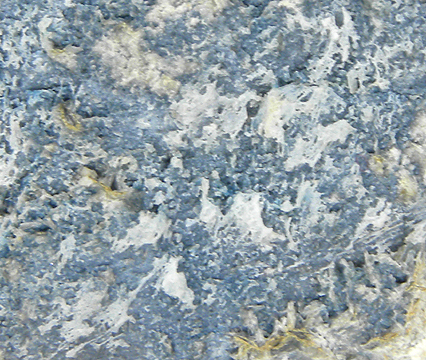

General
- Category: Minerals
- Formula: Mo_{3}O_{8}·nH_{2}O
- IMA symbol: Ils
- Strunz classification: 4.FJ.15
- Dana classification: 4.6.3.1
- Crystal system: Amorphous

Identification
- Color: Black, blue-black, blue; Turns blue on exposure to sunlight
- Mohs scale hardness: 5.5 - 6
- Streak: Brownish black
- Diaphaneity: Translucent
- Solubility: Soluble in H_{2}O

Ilsemannite is an uncommon amorphous complex heterovalent molybdenum oxide, that was first published in 1871, and has been a valid species since pre-IMA. It is a grandfathered mineral, meaning the name ilsemannite is still believed to refer to a valid species. However, it is likely that specimens formed under different conditions, in different localities do not have the same composition, and may even be a mixture of compounds. Furthermore, it is hard to analyze the specimens due to them being a mixture, hence why adequate analyses are lacking of said mineral. Ilsemannite is believed to be identical to synthetic molybdic oxide.

== Properties ==
Ilsemannite is soluble in water, which at first produces a greenish blue color, which later changes to a deep molybdenum-blue. This is probably why Native Americans believed that ilsemannite colored the waters blue in the Idaho Springs area, however, this has been debunked. Ilsemannite is now believed to consist of molybdenum (66.34%) and oxygen (33.19%), having a negligible amount of hydrogen (0.46%) in it. It has an earthy, dull, clay-like texture, and it is amorphous, meaning ilsemannite does not grow crystals. It does not show any radioactive properties.

In an occurrence near Ouray, Utah, researchers found ilsemannite specimens disseminated through a rock. Analyses showed that about 10% of the sample was water-soluble, and that the water-soluble portion contains iron sulfate. Back then, in 1917, researches concluded that specimens from other localities all showed that iron sulfate was present in each of them, which is why the formula of said mineral was believed to be MoO_{3}·SO_{3}·5H_{2}O. A specimen from Saxony mixed with iron sulfate showed only small amounts of iron, and gave a strong sulfate reaction. Another specimen from Carinthia had the same reaction, however this specimen had only a trace of ferric iron, with no ferrous iron in it. The specimen from Cripple Creek, Colorado showed the exact same reaction.

During a study, it was found out that jordisite alters to ilsemannite more readily than it does to molybdenite, probably due to its amorphous state. This, among the scarcity of jordisite in mineral deposits, could explain why ilsemannite can be discovered in molybdenum districts. When first found, the mineral is usually black-blue or black in color, and it turns to blue-green and fades when exposed to sunlight. When put in a furnace alongside cinnabar, the calcined product's color changed to a purplish pink color. Chemical analyses of the material were not obtained due to the fact that the very thin coating surrounding ilsemannite couldn't be separated from the specimens. Underneath this coating there was a black, submetallic, sectile mineral first believed to be metacinnabar, but it was later proved to be a molybdenum compound. It was obvious that ilsemannite was an alteration product of this compound. The specimen from Colorado was described to have this coating as well, only that this time it was green. It is believed that the specimen was actually either a yellow iron sulfate, or a yellow molybdite, which was colored green due to the ilsemannite solution.

== Occurrences and localities ==
Ilsemannite forms by the oxidation of molybdenum-bearing minerals, making it a secondary mineral. It is associated with gypsum, wulfenite, melanterite, halotrichite, molybdite, molybdenite, jordisite, and other oxidized uranium minerals; however, it had been found in association with cinnabar as well in 1939. In the aforementioned encounter, ilsemannite was found as veinlets and as irregular lenses or pods in association of the cinnabar specimens. These specimens were described to often stain the nearby calcites a light blue color. It has a type locality of Carinthia, and although it is an uncommon mineral, it has been described in more than a dozen of other localities since then. Despite this fact, there is still an uncertainty lingering around the chemical composition and the origin of the mineral.
