= Iyoite =

General
- Category: Halide minerals
- Formula: MnCuCl(OH)_{3}
- IMA symbol: Iy
- Crystal system: Monoclinic
- Crystal class: Prismatic (2/m) (same H-M symbol)
- Space group: P2_{1}/m
- Unit cell: a = 5.622, b = 6.586 c = 5.719 [Å]; β = 91.55°; Z = 2

Identification

Iyoite is a very rare manganese copper chloride hydroxide mineral with the formula MnCuCl(OH)_{3}. Iyoite is a new member of the atacamite group, and it an analogue of botallackite characterized in manganese and copper ordering. Iyoite is monoclinic (space group P2_{1}/m). It is chemically similar to misakiite. Both minerals come from the Ohku mine in the Ehime prefecture, Japan.
