= Titanium (native) =

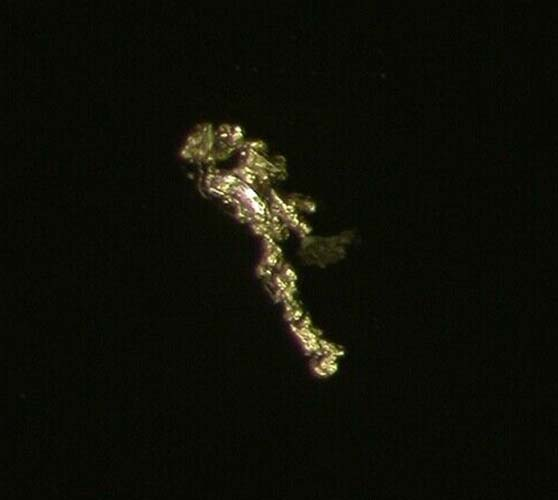
- Nugget of pure, analyticaly confirmed by microprobe native titanium (0.55 mm long crystals) (dendrites) from the First scoria cone, Northern Breakthrough, Great Fissure Eruption, Tolbachik volcano, Kamchatka peninsula Russian Federation.

General
- Category: Native element mineral
- Formula: Ti
- Crystal system: Hexagonal
- Crystal class: Dihexagonal dipyramidal (6/mmm); H-M symbol: (6/m 2/m 2/m)
- Space group: P6_{3}/mmc

Identification
- Color: Silver-grey
- Fracture: Hackly
- Tenacity: Malleable
- Mohs scale hardness: 4
- Luster: Metallic
- Streak: Grayish black
- Diaphaneity: Opaque

Native titanium (IMA2010–044) is a naturally occurring form of the metal titanium. It can be found in the Luobusa mining district, Luobusha fault zone (Yarlung Zangbo suture zone), Qusum County, Shannan, Tibet.
