= Tlalocite =

Rare and complex tellurate mineral

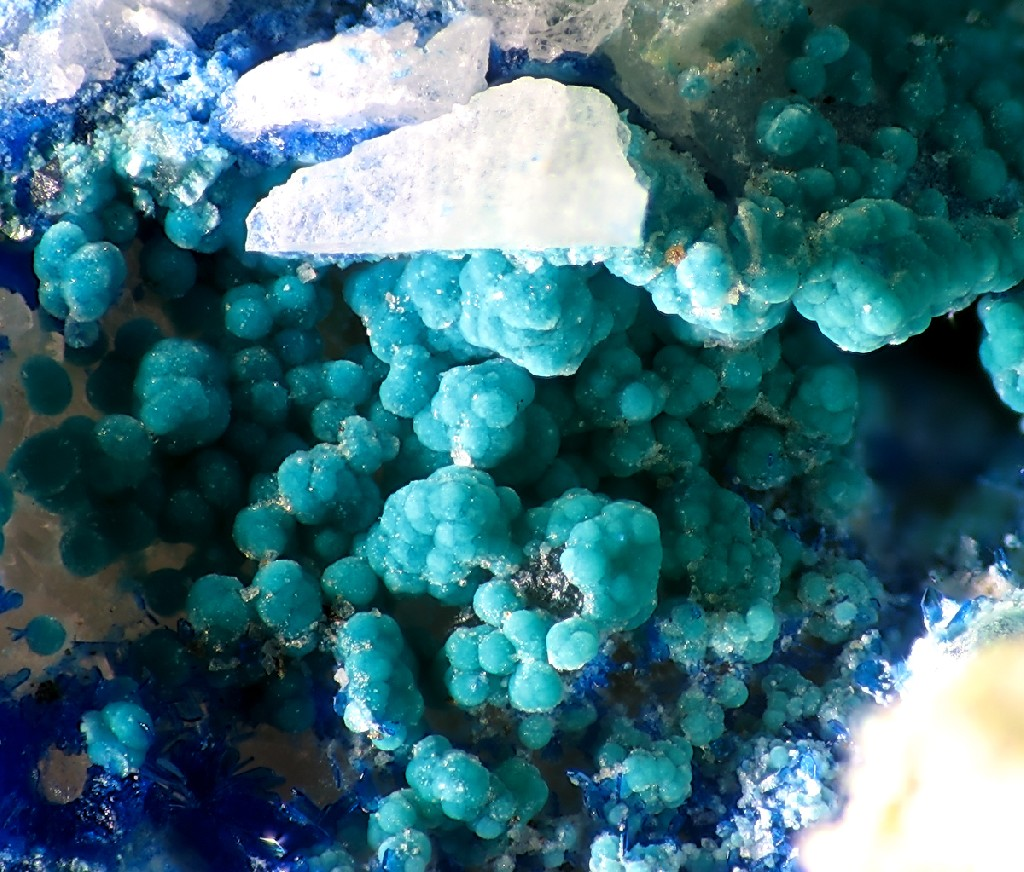
- Tlalocite spherules from Bambollita Mine (Oriental Mine), Moctezuma, Mun. de Moctezuma, Sonora, Mexico (picture width: 3 mm).

General
- Category: Minerals
- Formula: Cu_{10}Zn_{6}(TeO_{4})_{2}(TeO_{3})(OH)_{25}Cl · 25 H_{2}O
- IMA symbol: Tia
- Strunz classification: 7.DE.20
- Dana classification: 33.3.2.1
- Crystal system: Orthorhombic; Unknown space group
- Unit cell: a = 16.78, b = 19.985 c = 12.069 [Å], Z = 4

Identification
- Color: Capri blue, green in transmitted light
- Crystal habit: Velvety crusts or spheres, arced bands
- Fracture: Sectile, curved shavings or scrapings
- Tenacity: Gummy and sectile
- Mohs scale hardness: 1
- Streak: Pale blue
- Diaphaneity: Translucent
- Specific gravity: 4.55 (measured) 4.58 (calculated)
- Optical properties: Biaxial (-)
- Birefringence: δ = 0.052
- Pleochroism: Green, bluish green
- 2V angle: 64
- Ultraviolet fluorescence: none
- Solubility: Insoluble

Tlalocite is a rare and complex tellurate mineral with the formula Cu_{10}Zn_{6}(TeO_{4})_{2}(TeO_{3})(OH)_{25}Cl · 27 H_{2}O. It has a Mohs hardness of 1, and a cyan color. It was named after Tlaloc, the Aztec god of rain, in allusion to the high amount of water contained within the crystal structure. It is not to be confused with quetzalcoatlite, which often looks similar in color and habit.

== Occurrence ==
Tlalocite was first identified in the Bambollite mine (La Oriental), Moctezuma, Municipio de Moctezuma, Sonora, Mexico and it was approved by the IMA in 1974. It often occurs together with tenorite, azurite, malachite and tlapallite. It is found in partially oxidized portions of tellurium-bearing hydrothermal veins.
