= Xocomecatlite =

Rare tellurate mineral

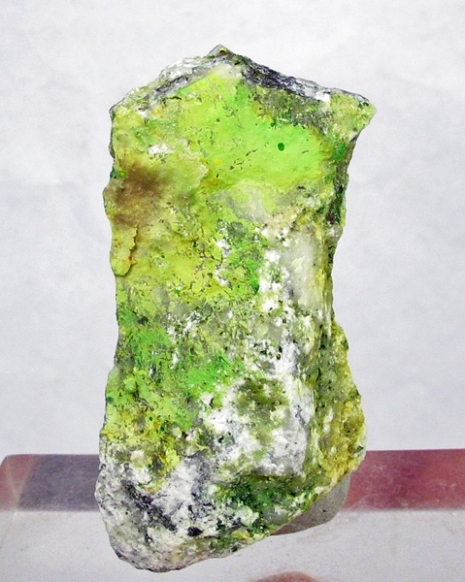
- Xocomecatlite (green) in quartz matrix, collected from Trixie Mine, East Tintic District, East Tintic Mountains, Utah, United States

General
- Category: Tellurate mineral
- Formula: Cu_{3}(TeO_{4})(OH)_{4}
- IMA symbol: Xco
- Strunz classification: 7.BB.50
- Crystal system: Orthorhombic; Unknown space group
- Unit cell: a = 12.14 Å, b = 14.31 Å c = 11.66 Å; Z = 12

Identification
- Formula mass: 450.26 g/mol
- Color: Green, emerald green
- Crystal habit: Aggregates of radial to spherulitic or botryoidal acicular crystals
- Tenacity: Brittle
- Mohs scale hardness: 4
- Streak: light green
- Diaphaneity: Translucent
- Specific gravity: 4.65
- Density: 4.42 g/cm3
- Optical properties: Biaxial (−)
- Refractive index: n_{α} = 1.775 n_{β} = 1.900 n_{γ} = 1.920
- Birefringence: δ = 0.145
- Pleochroism: Rich bluish greens
- 2V angle: Measured: 41°

Xocomecatlite is a rare tellurate mineral with formula: Cu_{3}(TeO_{4})(OH)_{4}. It is an orthorhombic mineral which occurs as aggregates or spherules of green needlelike crystals.

It was first described in 1975 for an occurrence in the Oriental mine near Moctezuma, Sonora, Mexico. It has also been reported from the Centennial Eureka mine in the Tintic District, Juab County, Utah and the Emerald mine of the Tombstone District, Cochise County, Arizona in the United States. The name is derived from xocomecatl, the Nahuatl word for "bunches of grapes", and alludes to the mineral's appearance as a set of green spherules. It occurs in the oxidized zone of gold-tellurium veins in altered rhyolite. It occurs associated with other rare tellurate minerals: parakhinite, dugganite, tlapallite, mcalpineite, leisingite, jensenite; the sulfate–phosphate minerals: hinsdalite–svanbergite; and the oxide goethite.
