= Ichnusaite =

General
- Category: Molybdate minerals
- Formula: Th(MoO_{4})_{2}•3H_{2}O
- IMA symbol: Ich
- Crystal system: Monoclinic
- Crystal class: Prismatic (2/m) (same H-M symbol)
- Space group: P2_{1}/b
- Unit cell: a = 9.68, b = 10.38 c = 9.38 [Å], β = 90.00° (approximated); Z = 4

Identification
- Color: Colorless
- Cleavage: {100}, perfect
- Tenacity: Brittle
- Luster: Pearly adamantine
- Other characteristics: Radioactive

Ichnusaite (pronounced iknusa-ait) is a very rarely found mineral. Ichnusaite is a natural compound of thorium and molybdenum with the formula Th(MoO_{4})_{2}·3H_{2}O. It was discovered in Su Seinargiu, Sarroch, Cagliari, Sardegna, Italy in 2013. The name is from the old Greek name of Sardinia, Ιχνουσσα, Ichnusa.
This locality is also a place of discovery of the second natural thorium molybdate - nuragheite.

== Occurrence and association ==
Muscovite, nuragheite, and xenotime-(Y) are the associates of ichnusaite.

== Notes on chemistry ==
Ichnusaite is chemically pure.

== Crystal structure ==
The main features of the crystal structure of ichnusaite are:

- electroneutral Th(MoO_{4})_{2}(H_{2}O)_{2} (100) sheets
- ThO_{7}(H_{2}O)_{2} and MoO_{4} polyhedra polymerize to give the above sheets
- sheets are stacked along [100] and held by hydrogen bonds

== Bibliography ==
- Orlandi, P., Biagioni, C., Bindi, L. und Nestola, F. (2013) Ichnusaite, IMA 2013- 087. CNMNC Newsletter No. 18, December 2013, page 3255; Mineralogical Magazine, 77, 3249-325
- http://rruff.geo.arizona.edu/AMS/result.php?mineral=Ichnusaite
- https://web.archive.org/web/20160521090233/http://ammin.geoscienceworld.org/content/99/10/2089
- https://arpi.unipi.it/handle/11568/638691#.Vr93OUKuAt4
- http://www.degruyter.com/dg/viewarticle/j$002fammin.2014.99.issue-10$002fam-2014-4844$002fam-2014-4844.xml
- https://www.bbc.com/news/science-environment-35569659
