= Teineite =

Tellurite mineral

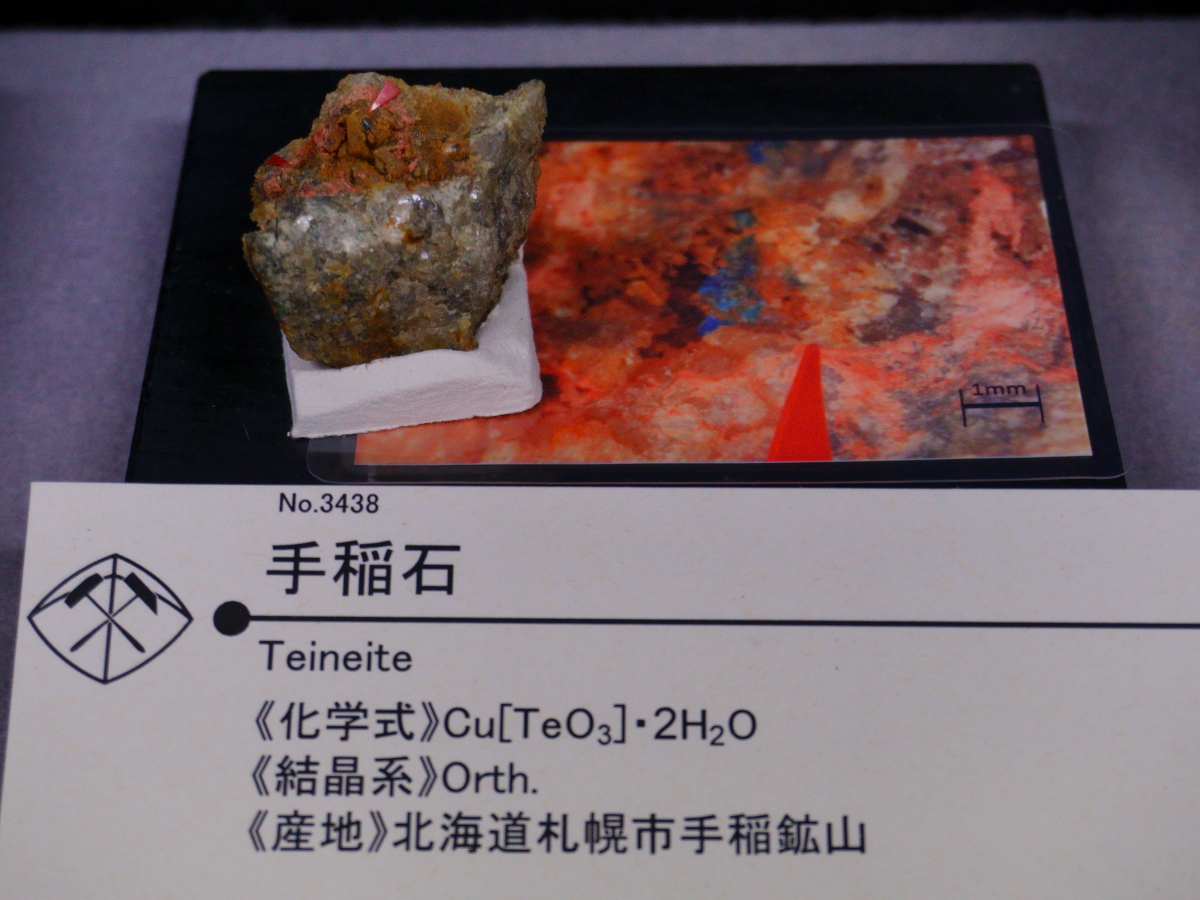

General
- Category: Minerals
- Formula: Cu(TeO_{3})·2 H_{2}O
- IMA symbol: Tei
- Strunz classification: 4.JM.20
- Dana classification: 34.2.2.2
- Crystal system: Orthorhombic
- Crystal class: Disphenoidal (222); H-M symbol: (2 2 2)
- Space group: P2_{1}2_{1}2_{1}
- Unit cell: a = 6.63, b = 9.61 c = 7.43 [Å]; Z = 4

Identification
- Color: Sky-blue, cobalt-blue, bluish gray, bright blue to greenish blue in transmitted light.
- Crystal habit: Prismatic or flattened crystals, Sometimes as crusts or aggregates
- Cleavage: Distinct
- Fracture: Brittle
- Tenacity: Brittle
- Mohs scale hardness: 2.5
- Luster: Vitreous, dull
- Streak: Light blue
- Diaphaneity: Semitransparent
- Specific gravity: 3.8
- Optical properties: Biaxial (−)
- Birefringence: δ = 0.024
- Pleochroism: Various shades of blue
- 2V angle: 36^{o}
- Fusibility: Fusible, gives a black bead
- Solubility: Insoluble
- Common impurities: Sulfur

Teineite is a tellurite mineral with the formula Cu(TeO_{3}). 2 H_{2}O. It has a Mohs hardness of 2.5 and it comes in many different shades of blue, ranging from cerulean blue to bluish-gray. The mineral millsite has the same chemical composition, but crystallizes in the monoclinic system, while teineite crystallizes in the orthorhombic system.

== Occurrence ==
Teineite was first identified in the Teine mine, Sapporo, Hokkaido, Japan, where the name of this mineral originates. It occurs in veins where copper- and tellurium-bearing sulfides were oxidized and is often associated with tellurite, tellurium, pyrite, tetrahedrite, sphalerite, azurite, malachite, quartz, baryte, hessite, galena, bornite, cerussite, chlorargyrite, quetzalcoatlite, cuprite and graemite. It has also been found in other places, including other mines in Japan, several mines in the US and mines in Mexico, Belgium, Russia and Norway.

== See also ==
- List of minerals
