= Fusibility =

Ability of materials to blend

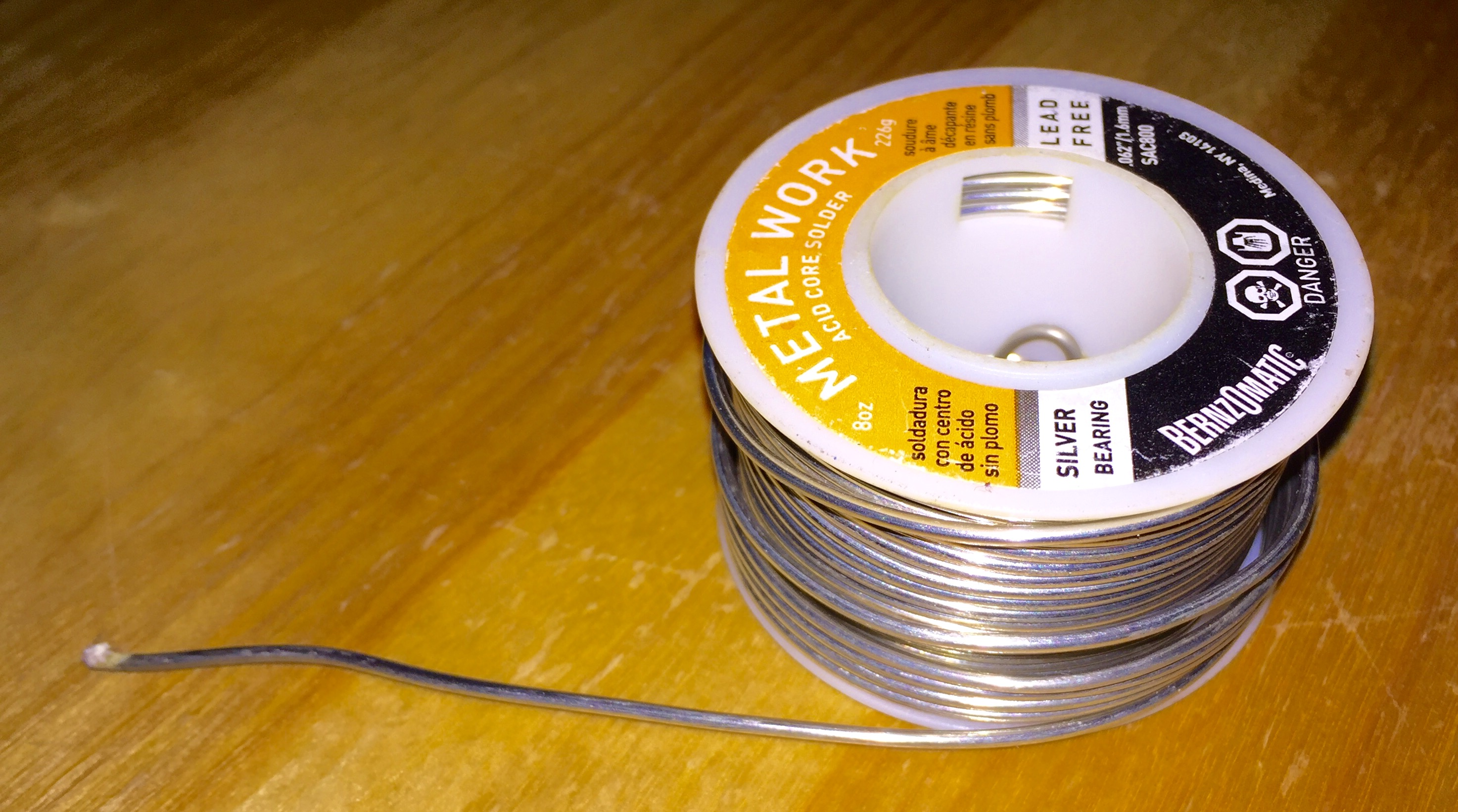
Solder wire

The fusibility of a material refers to the ease at which the material can be fused together, or to the temperature or amount of heat required to melt a material. Materials such as solder require a relatively low melting point so that when heat is applied to a joint, the solder will melt before the materials being soldered together melt, i.e. high fusibility. On the other hand, firebricks used for furnace linings only melt at very high temperatures (and then they retract, or decompose, or become fracture-prone) and so have low fusibility. Refractory materials often have low fusibility.

== Scientific methods ==
To find the fusibility of certain compounds/materials, there are 2 methods:

=== Heat test ===
The most common test used to determine fusibility is to join two pieces with a variable heat source, increasing the temperature or power used in steps, and testing bond strength for each step. If there is no step with good bond strength after joining, then fusibility is said to be low.

=== Ash fusibility test ===
In the context of coal analysis, ash fusibility values of the residual coal ash of a coal are often specified. The values are determined using an empirical method based on the geometrical changes upon heating to a relevant temperature, of a conical ash sample. The fusibility of the ash is of interest because it roughly indicates the properties of the clinker that will be produced during burning.
