= List of minerals recognized by the International Mineralogical Association (Y–Z) =

This list includes those recognised minerals beginning with the letters Y and Z. The International Mineralogical Association is the international group that recognises new minerals and new mineral names; however, minerals discovered before 1959 did not go through the official naming procedure, although some minerals published previously have been either confirmed or discredited since that date. This list contains a mixture of mineral names that have been approved since 1959 and those mineral names believed to still refer to valid mineral species (these are called "grandfathered" species).

The list is divided into groups:

- Introduction • (Main synonyms)
- A • B • C • D • E • F • G • H • I • J • K • L • M • N • O • P–Q • R • S • T • U–V • W–X • Y–Z

The data was exported from mindat.org on 29 April 2005; updated up to 'IMA2021'.

The minerals are sorted by name, followed by the structural group (rruff.info/ima and ima-cnmnc by mineralienatlas.de, mainly) or chemical class (mindat.org and basics), the year of publication (if it's before of an IMA approval procedure), the IMA approval and the Strunz-mindat code. The first link is to mindat.org, the second link is to webmineral.com, and the third is to the Handbook of Mineralogy (Mineralogical Society of America).

- Abbreviations:
  - ^{D} – discredited (IMA/CNMNC status).
  - ^{Q} – questionable/ doubtful (IMA/CNMNC, mindat.org or mineralienatlas.de status).
  - ^{N} – published without approval of the IMA/CNMNC, or just not an IMA approved mineral but with some acceptance in the scientific community nowadays.
  - ^{I} – intermediate member of a solid-solution series.
  - ^{H} – hypothetical mineral (synthetic, anthropogenic, suspended approval procedure, etc.)
    - ^{ch} – incomplete description, hypothetical solid solution end member.
  - Rd – redefinition of ...
  - "s.p." – special procedure.
  - group – a name used to designate a group of species, sometimes only a mineral group name.
  - no – no link available.
  - IUPAC – chemical name.
  - Y: NNNN – year of publication.
  - Y: old – known before publications were available.

== Y ==
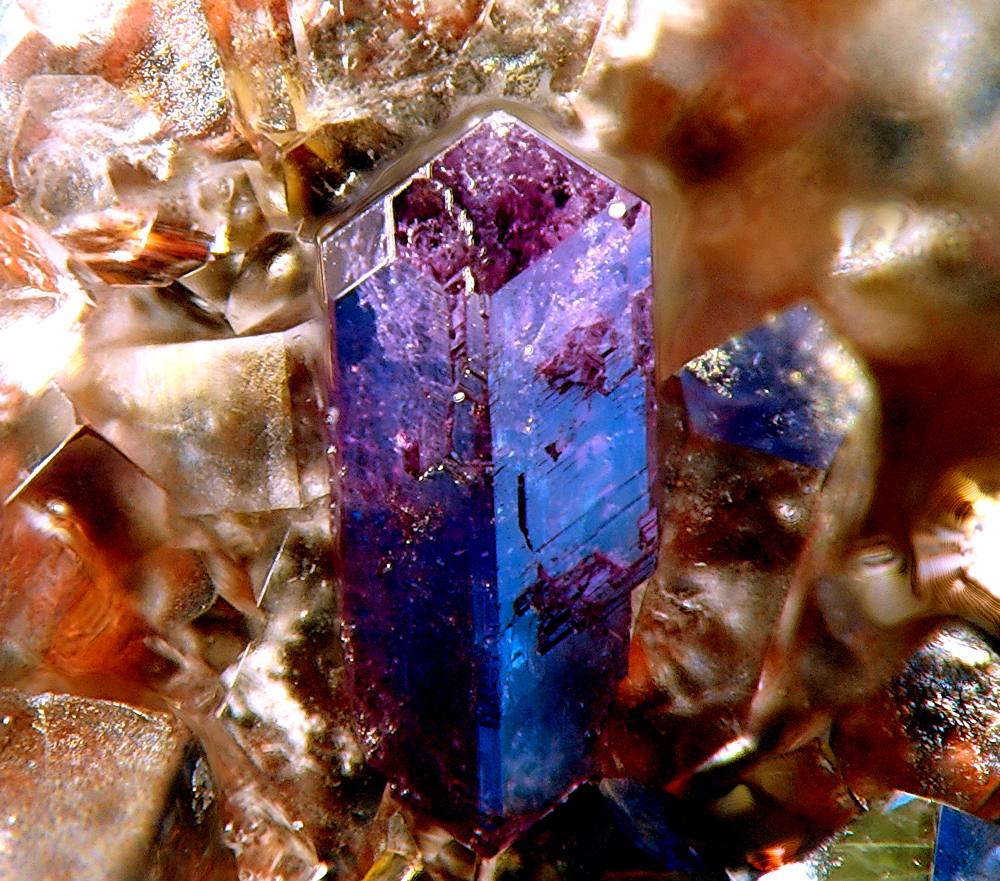
Yedlinite found at Mammoth-Saint Anthony Mine, Arizona, United States

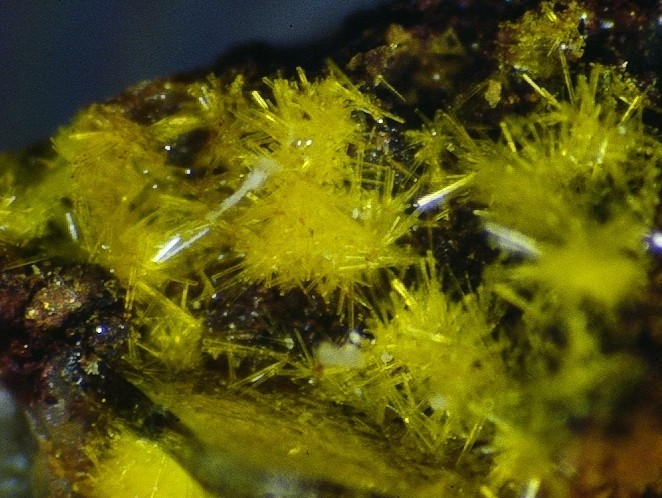
Yingjiangite. Tirpersdorf, Oelsnitz, Vogtland, Saxony, Germany

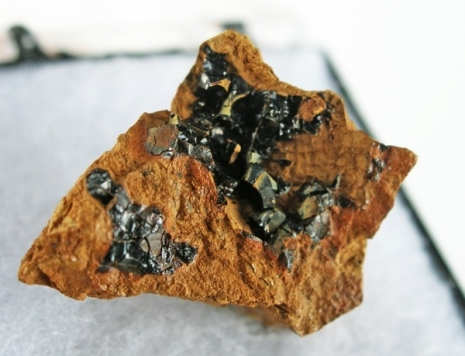
Yukonite found at Venus Mine, Yukon, Canada

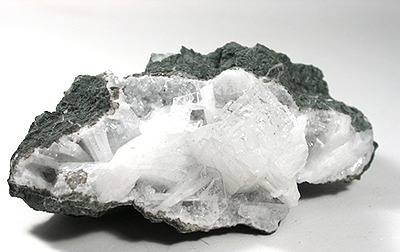
Yugawaralite crystals in a sheltered vug, from Jalgaon District, Maharashtra, India

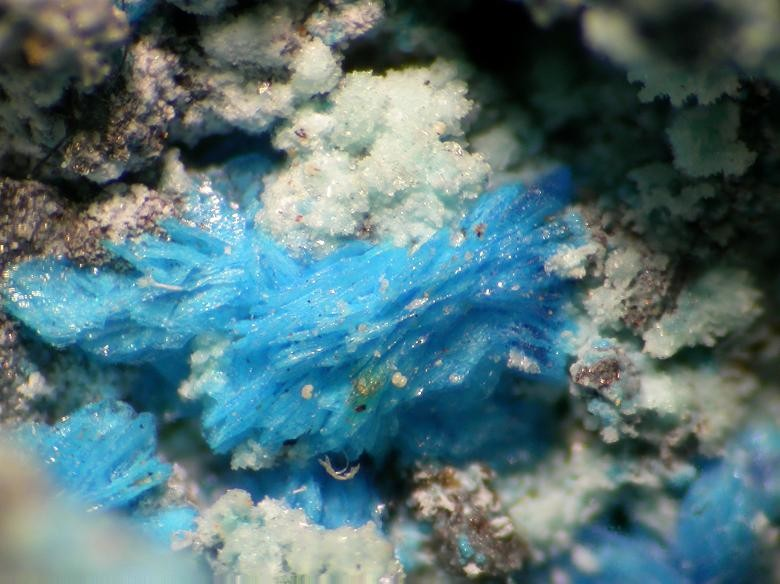
Yvonite found at Salsigne mine, France

1. Yafsoanite (garnet: IMA1981-022) 4.CC.25
  (IUPAC: tricalcium ditellurium(IV) tri(tetraoxozincate))
2. Yagiite (milarite: IMA1968-020) 9.CM.05
3. Yakhontovite (montmorillonite, smectite: IMA1984-032a) 9.EC.40
4. Yakovenchukite-(Y) (IMA2006-002) 9.EF.30 [no]
5. Yakubovichite (IMA2020-094) 8.0 [no] [no]
6. Yancowinnaite (tsumcorite: IMA2010-030) 8.0 [no] [no]
  (IUPAC: lead copper aluminium hydro diarsenate monohydrate)
7. Yangite (IMA2012-052) 9.D?. [no] [no]
  (IUPAC: lead manganese octaoxotrisilicate monohydrate)
8. Yangzhumingite (mica: IMA2009-017) 9.EC.20 [no]
  (IUPAC: dipotassium pentamagnesium icosaoxyoctasilicate tetrafluoride)
9. Yanomamite (IMA1990-052) 8.CD.10
  (IUPAC: indium arsenate dihydrate)
10. Yarlongite (carbide: IMA2007-035) 1.BA.30 [no]
  (IUPAC: (tetrachromium tetrairon nickel) tetracarbide)
11. Yaroshevskite (IMA2012-003) 8.0 [no] [no]
  (IUPAC: nonacopper dichloro dioxo tetravanadate)
12. Yaroslavite (IMA1968 s.p., 1966) 3.CB.50
  (IUPAC: tricalcium dihydro decafluorodialuminate monohydrate)
13. Yarrowite (IMA1978-022) 2.CA.05d
  (IUPAC: nonacopper octasulfide)
14. Yarzhemskiite (IMA2018-019) 6.0 [no] [no]
  (IUPAC: potassium [dihydro heptaoxo pentaborate] monohydrate)
15. Yavapaiite (IMA1962 s.p., 1959) 7.AC.15
  (IUPAC: potassium iron(III) disulfate)
16. Yazganite (alluaudite: IMA2003-033) 8.AC.10
  (IUPAC: sodium magnesium diiron(III) triarsenate monohydrate)
17. Yeatmanite (Y: 1938) 9.AE.45
18. Yecoraite (tellurite-tellurium oxysalt: IMA1983-062) 7.DF.70
  (IUPAC: triiron(III) pentabismuth nonaoxo trioxotellurate(IV) di(tetraoxotellurate(VI)) nonahydrate)
19. Yedlinite (IMA1974-001) 3.DB.50
20. Ye'elimite (IMA1984-052) 7.BC.15
  (IUPAC: tetracalcium hexaluminium dodecaoxide sulfate)
21. Yegorovite (IMA2008-033) 9.00. [no]
22. Yeomanite (IMA2013-024) 3.0 [no] [no]
  (IUPAC: dilead chloro oxohydroxide)
23. Yftisite-(Y)^{ch} (Y: 1971) 9.AG.25 [no]
  Note: discredited 1987, but crystal-structure determination was reported (Balko & Bakakin, 1975).
24. Yimengite (magnetoplumbite: IMA1982-046) 4.CC.45
25. Yingjiangite (phosphuranylite: IMA1989-001) 8.EC.10
  (IUPAC: dipotassium calcium heptauranyl hexahydro tetraphosphate hexahydrate)
26. Yixunite (auricupride: IMA1995-042) 1.AG.50
  (IUPAC: triplatinum indium alloy)
27. Yoderite (IMA1962 s.p., 1959) 9.AF.25
28. Yofortierite (palygorskite: IMA1974-045) 9.EE.20
29. Yoshimuraite (seidozerite, bafertisite: IMA1967 s.p., 1961) 9.BE.42
30. Yoshiokaite (feldspathoid, nepheline: IMA1989-043) 9.FA.05
31. Yttriaite-(Y) (IMA2010-039) 4.CC. [no] [no]
  (IUPAC: diyttrium trioxide)
32. Yttrialite-(Y) (IMA1987 s.p., 1889) 9.BC.05
33. Yttrocolumbite-(Y)^{Q} (IMA1987 s.p., 1837) 4.DB.25
  Note: possibly samarskite-(Y).
34. Yttrocrasite-(Y)^{Q} (columbite: IMA1987 s.p., 1906) 4.DG.05
  Note: its description is poor and so it is questionable.
35. Yttrotantalite-(Y) (IMA1987 s.p., 1802) 4.DG.10
36. Yttrotungstite 4.FD.20
  (IUPAC: REE ditungsten trihydro hexaoxide)
  1. Yttrotungstite-(Ce) (IMA1970-008) 4.FD.20 [no]
  2. Yttrotungstite-(Y) (IMA1987 s.p., 1927) 4.FD.20
37. Yuanfuliite (IMA1994-001) 6.AB.20
38. Yuanjiangite (tin alloy: IMA1993-028) 1.AC.15
  (IUPAC: gold stannide)
39. Yugawaralite (zeolitic tectosilicate: IMA1997 s.p., 1952) 9.GB.15
40. Yukonite (Y: 1913) 8.DM.25
  (IUPAC: dicalcium triiron(III) tetrahydro triarsenate tetrahydrate)
41. Yuksporite (Y: 1923) 9.DG.95
42. Yurgensonite (IMA2019-059) 8.0 [no] [no]
  (IUPAC: dipotassium tin titanium dioxo diarsenate)
43. Yurmarinite (anhydrous arsenate: IMA2013-033) 8.0 [no] [no]
44. Yushkinite (valleriite: IMA1983-050) 2.FD.30
45. Yusupovite (IMA2014-022) 9.D?. [no] [no]
46. Yuzuxiangite (ohmilite: IMA2020-084) [no] [no]
47. Yvonite (IMA1995-012) 8.CB.25
  (IUPAC: copper hydroxoarsenate(V) dihydrate)

== Z ==
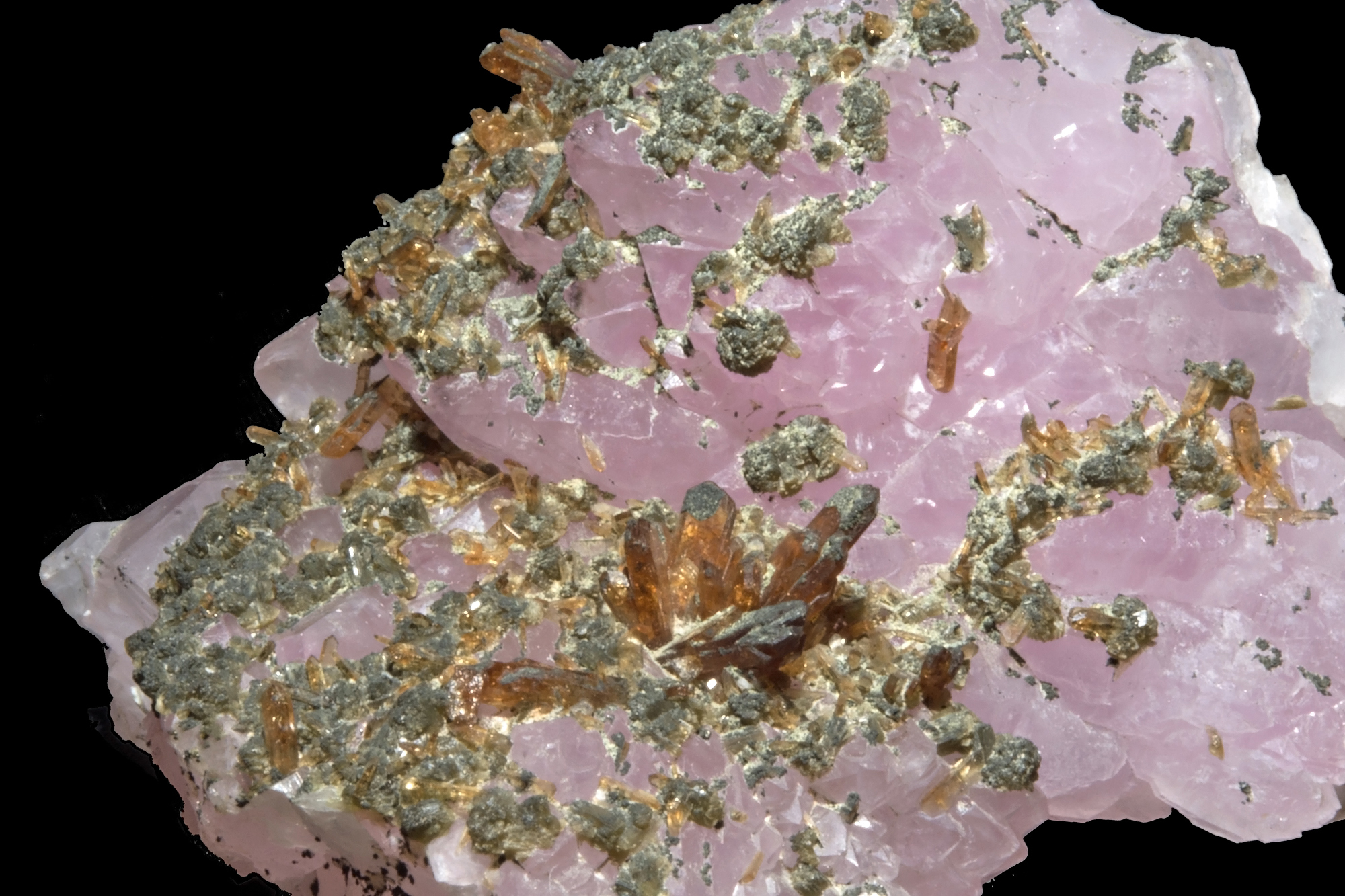
Zanazziite on quartz var. rose quartz: Ilha claim, Taquaral, Itinga, Jequitinhonha Valley, Minas Gerais Brazil

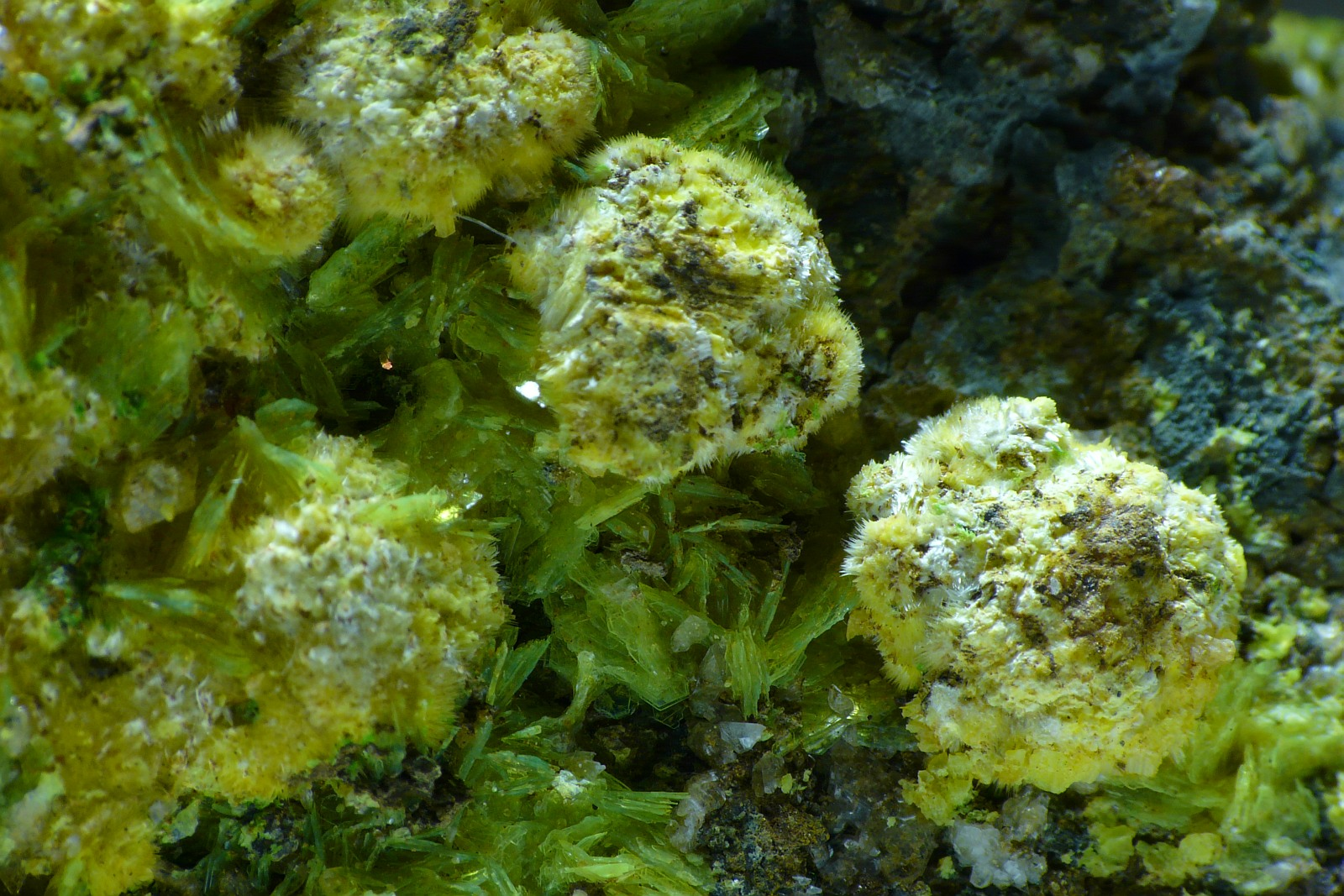
Zellerite from White Canyon No. 1 Mine (Cameo Mine), White Canyon, White Canyon District, San Juan County (Utah), USA

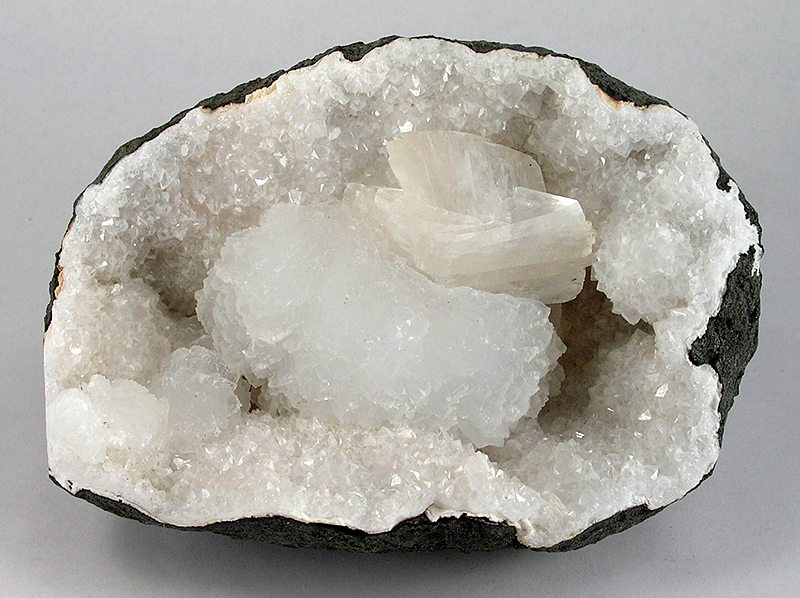
Zeolite with heulandite on quartz

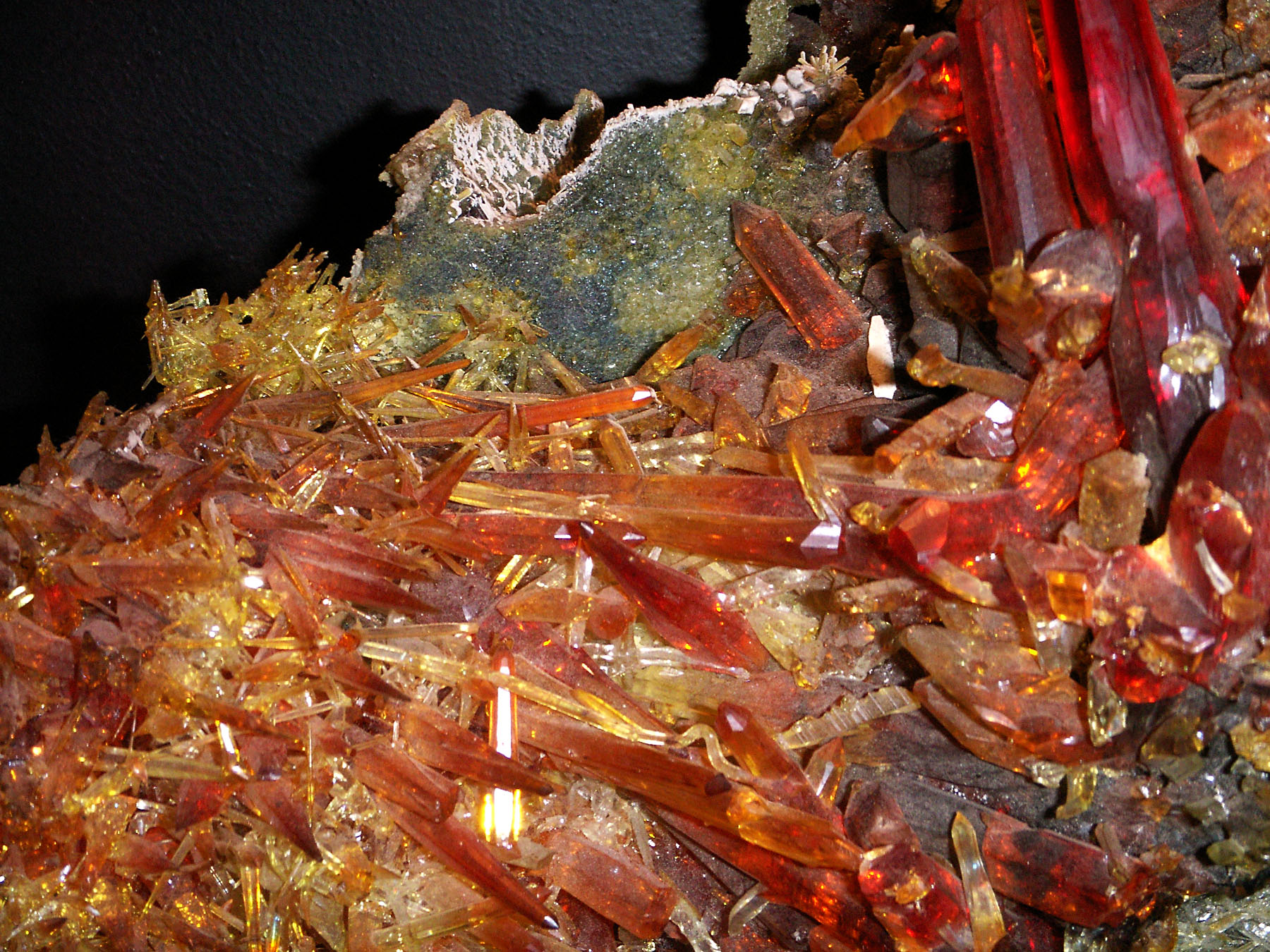
Crystal blades of zincite

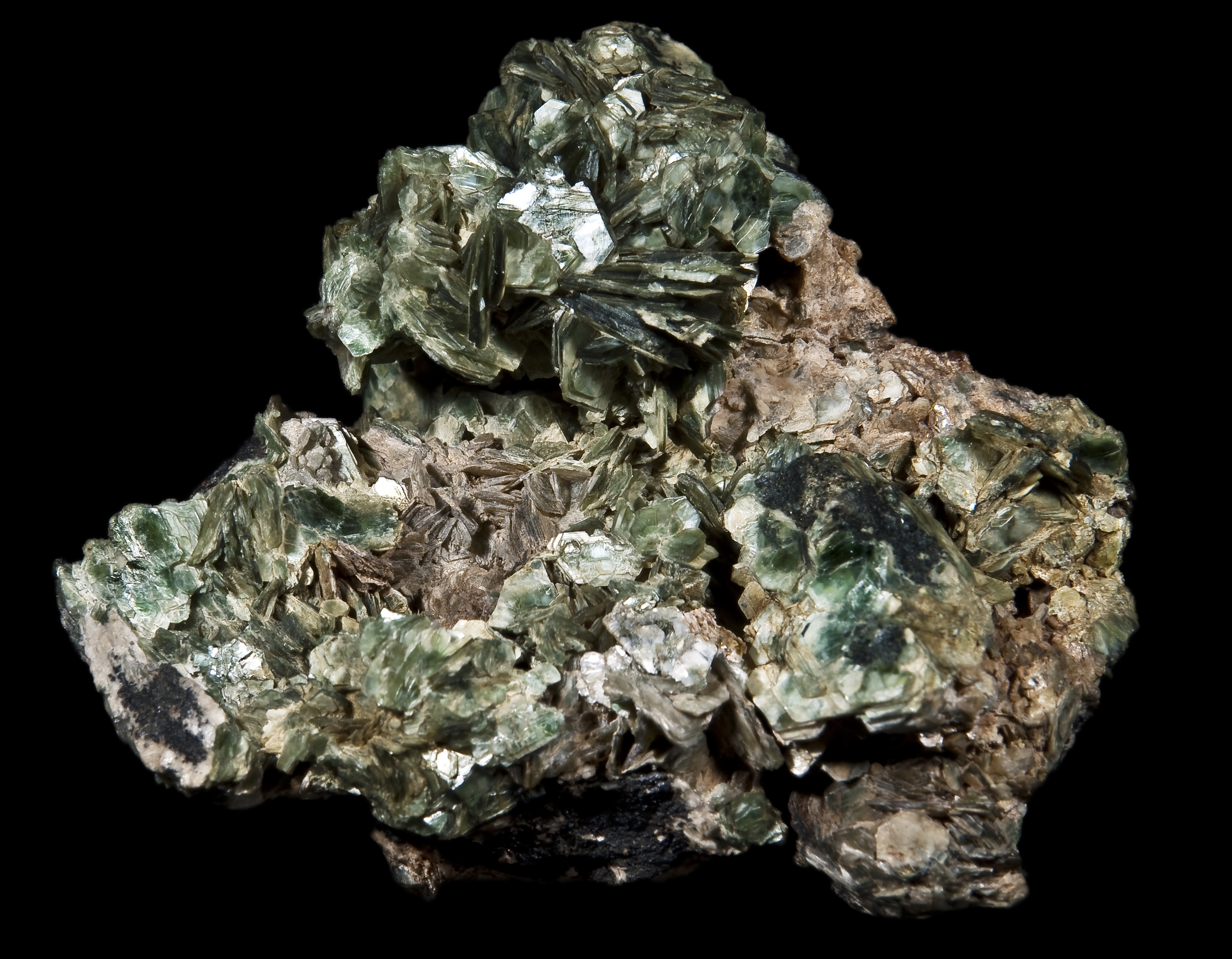
Zinnwaldite

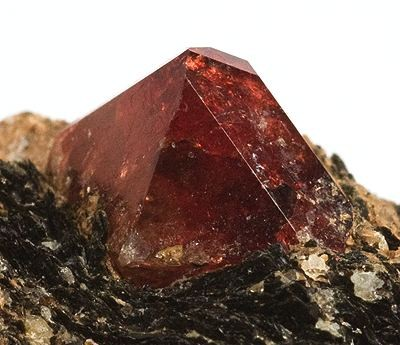
Zircon. Harchu (Harchoo), Astor valley (Astore valley), Astor District (Astore District), Northern Areas, Pakistan.

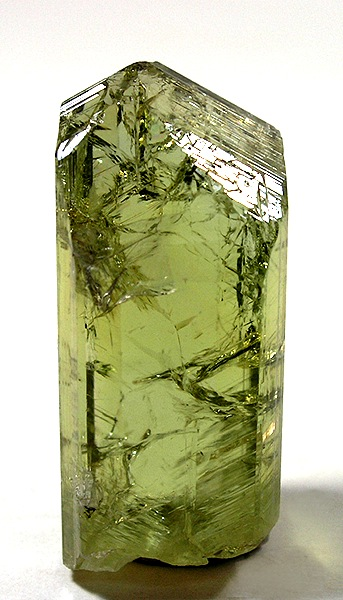
Zoisite. Merelani Hills (Mererani), Lelatema Mts, Arusha Region, Tanzania.

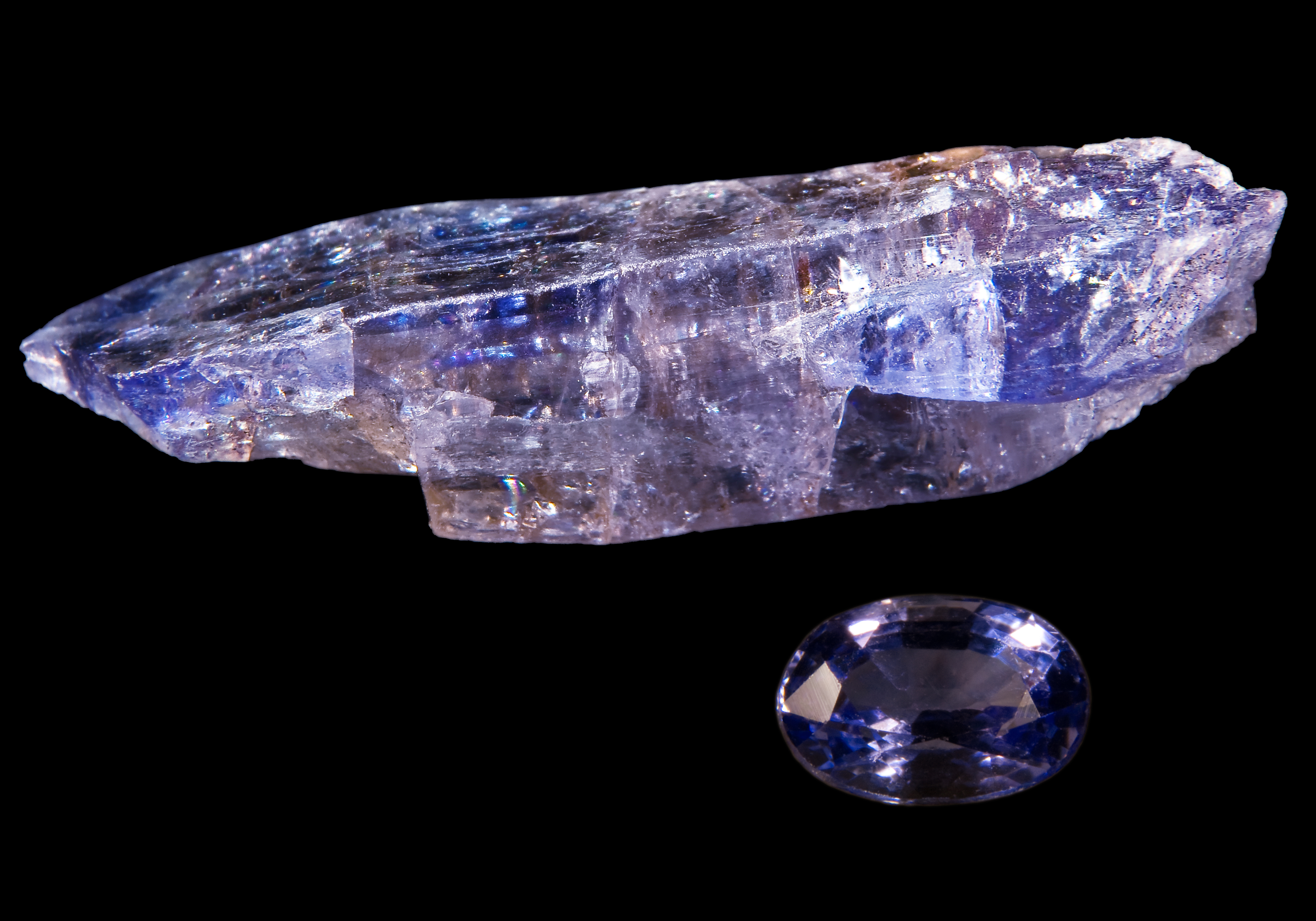
Zoisite (var. tanzanite), rough stone and cut stone

1. Żabińskiite (titanite: IMA2015-033) 9.AG.15 [no] [no]
2. Zabuyelite (IMA1985-018) 5.AA.05
  (IUPAC: dilithium carbonate)
3. Zaccagnaite (hydrotalcite: IMA1997-019) 5.DA.45
  (IUPAC: tetrazinc dialuminium dodecahydroxide carbonate trihydrate)
4. Zaccariniite (IMA2011-086) 2.0 [no]
  (IUPAC: rhenium nickel arsenide)
5. Zadovite (zadovite, arctite: IMA2013-031) 8.0 [no] [no]
  (IUPAC: barium hexacalcium fluoro [tetraoxosilicate phosphate] diphosphate)
6. Zagamiite (IMA2015-022a) 9.0 [no] [no]
  (IUPAC: dicalcium tetraluminium undecaoxoheptasilicate)
7. Zaherite (IMA1977-002) 7.DE.65
  (IUPAC: dodecaluminium hexaicosahydro pentasulfate icosahydrate)
8. Zaïrite (alunite, crandallite: IMA1975-018) 8.BL.13
  (IUPAC: bismuth triiron(III) hexahydro diphosphate)
9. Zakharovite (IMA1981-049) 9.EE.65
  (IUPAC: tetrasodium pentamanganese(V) tetraicosaoxodecasilicate hexahydroxyl hexahydrate)
10. Zálesíite (mixite: IMA1997-009) 8.DL.15 [no]
  (IUPAC: calcium hexacopper diarsenate hydroxoarsenate(V) hexahydroxide trihydrate)
11. Zanazziite (roscherite: IMA1986-054) 8.DA.10
  (IUPAC: dicalcium tetraberyllium pentamagnesium tetrahydro hexaphosphate hexahydrate)
12. Zangboite (silicide: IMA2007-036) 1.BB. [no]
  (IUPAC: titanum iron disilicide)
13. Zapatalite (IMA1971-023) 08.DE.20
  (IUPAC: tricopper tetraluminium nonahydro triphosphate tetrahydrate)
14. Zaratite^{Q} (amorphous: 1934) 5.DA.15
  (IUPAC: trinickel carbonate tetrahydroxide tetrahydrate)
  Note: partially amorphous.
15. Zavalíaite (olivine: IMA2011-012) 8.0 [no]
  (IUPAC: trimanganese(II) diphosphate)
16. Zavaritskite (matlockite: IMA1967 s.p., 1962) 3.DC.25
  (IUPAC: bismuth oxofluoride)
17. Zaykovite (IMA2019-084) 2.0 [no] [no]
  (IUPAC: trirhenium tetraselenide)
18. Zdeněkite (lavendulan: IMA1992-037) 8.DG.05
  (IUPAC: sodium lead pentacopper chloro tetrarsenate pentahydrate)
19. Zektzerite (IMA1976-034) 9.DN.05
  (IUPAC: sodium lithium zirconium pentadecaoxohexasilicate)
20. Zellerite (IMA1965-031) 5.EC.10
  (IUPAC: calcium uranyl dicarbonate pentahydrate)
21. Zemannite (zemannite: IMA1968-009) 4.JM.05
22. Zemkorite (IMA1985-041) 5.AC.10
  (IUPAC: disodium calcium dicarbonate)
23. Zenzénite (IMA1990-031) 4.CC.55
  (IUPAC: trilead tetrairon(III) trimanganese(IV) pentadecaoxide)
24. Zeophyllite (Y: 1902) 9.EE.70
25. Zeravshanite (IMA2003-034) 9.EA.75
  (IUPAC: disodium tetracaesium trizirconium pentatetracontaoxooctadecasilicate dihydrate)
26. Zeunerite (autunite: 1872) 8.EB.05
  (IUPAC: copper diuranyl diarsenate dodecahydrate)
27. Zhanghengite (iron: IMA1985-049) 1.AB.10a
  (IUPAC: copper zinc alloy)
28. Zhanghuifenite (alluaudite: IMA2016-074) 8.0 [no] [no]
  (IUPAC: trisodium tetramanganese(II) dimagnesium aluminium hexaphosphate)
29. Zhangpeishanite (matlockite: IMA2006-045) 3.DC.25
  (IUPAC: barium fluoride chloride)
30. Zharchikhite (IMA1986-059) 3.AC.05
  (IUPAC: aluminium dihydroxide fluoride)
31. Zhemchuzhnikovite (oxalate: 1963) 10.AB.35
32. Zhengminghuaite (IMA2022-047) 2. [no] [no]
33. Zhenruite (IMA2022-050) 4.CB. [no] [no]
34. Zheshengite (IMA2022-011) 8.BH. [no] [no]
35. Zhiqinite (silicide: IMA2019-077) 1.0 [no] [no]
  (IUPAC: titanium disilicide)
36. Ziesite (IMA1979-055) 8.FA.10
  (IUPAC: beta-dicopper heptaoxodivanadate(V))
37. Zigrasite (IMA2008-046) 8.CE.75 [no]
  (IUPAC: magnesium zirconium diphosphate tetrahydrate)
38. Zimbabweite (IMA1984-034) 4.JA.40
39. Ziminaite (howardevansite: IMA2014-062) 8.0 [no] [no]
  (IUPAC: hexairon(III) hexavanadate)
40. Zinc (element: old) 1.AB.05
41. Zincalstibite (hydrotalcite: IMA1998-033) 4.FB.10 [no]
  (IUPAC: dizinc aluminium hexahydroxide [antimony hexahydroxide])
42. Zincaluminite^{Q} (woodwardite: 1881) 7.DD.35
  Note: undetermined X-ray powder diffraction pattern and unknown crystallography.
43. Zincgartrellite (tsumcorite: IMA1998-014) 8.CG.20
  (IUPAC: lead dizinc di(water,hydro) diarsenate)
44. Zincite (wurzite: 1845) 4.AB.20
  (IUPAC: zinc oxide)
45. Zinclipscombite (IMA2006-008) 8.BB.90 [no]
  (IUPAC: zinc diiron(III) dihydro diphosphate)
46. Zincmelanterite (melanterite: IMA2007 s.p., 1920) 7.CB.35
  (IUPAC: zinc sulfate heptahydrate)
47. Zincoberaunite (beraunite: IMA2015-117) 8.0 [no] [no]
  (IUPAC: zinc pentairon(III) pentahydro tetraphosphate hexahydrate)
48. Zincobotryogen (IMA2015-107, 1964) 7.DC.25
  (IUPAC: zinc pentairon(III) hydro disulfate heptahydrate)
49. Zincobradaczekite (alluaudite: IMA2016-041) 8.0 [no] [no]
  (NaCuCuZn_{2}(AsO_{4})_{3})
50. Zincobriartite (stannite: IMA2015-094) 2.0 [no] [no]
51. Zincochromite (spinel, spinel: IMA1986-015) 4.BB.05
  (IUPAC: zinc dichromium(III) tetraoxide)
52. Zincocopiapite (copiapite: 1964) 7.DB.35
  (IUPAC: zinc tetrairon(III) dihydro hexasulfate icosahydrate)
53. Zincohögbomite (högbomite, zincohögbomite) 4.CB.20
  1. Zincohögbomite-2N2S (IMA1994-016) 4.CB.20 [no]
  2. Zincohögbomite-2N6S (IMA2001 s.p., 1952) 4.CB.20 [no]
54. Zincolibethenite (andalusite: IMA2003-010) 8.BB.30
  (IUPAC: copper zinc hydro phosphate)
55. Zincolivenite (andalusite: IMA2006-047) 8.BB.30 [no]
  (IUPAC: copper zinc hydro arsenate)
56. Zincomenite (IMA2014-014) 7.A0. [no] [no]
  (IUPAC: zinc selenite)
57. Zinconigerite (högbomite, nigerite) 4.FC.20
  1. Zinconigerite-2N1S (IMA2018-037) 4.FC.20 [no] [no]
  2. Zinconigerite-6N6S^{N} (högbomite: IMA2002 s.p.) 4.FC.20 [no] [no]
58. Zincospiroffite (tellurite: IMA2002-047) 4.JK.10
  (IUPAC: dizinc tritellurium octaoxide)
59. Zincostaurolite (IMA1992-036) 9.AF.30 [no]
  (IUPAC: dizinc nonaluminium triicosaoxotetrasilicate hydroxyl)
60. Zincostrunzite (strunzite: IMA2016-023) 8.0 [no] [no]
  (IUPAC: dizinc tetrairon(III) tetrahydro tetraphosphate tridecahydrate)
61. Zincovelesite-6N6S (högbomite: IMA2017-034) 4.0 [no] [no]
62. Zincovoltaite (voltaite: IMA1985-059) 7.CC.25
  (IUPAC: dipotassium pentazinc triiron(III) aluminium dodecasulfate octadecahydrate)
63. Zincowoodwardite (hydrotalcite: IMA1998-026) 7.DD.35
64. Zincrosasite^{Q} (malachite: 1952) 5.BA.10
  Note: description incomplete, possibly rosasite.
65. Zincroselite (roselite: IMA1985-055) 8.CG.10
  (IUPAC: dicalcium zinc diarsenate dihydrate)
66. Zincsilite (saponite, smectite: 1960) 9.EC.45
67. Zinczippeite (zippeite: IMA1971-008) 7.EC.05
  (IUPAC: dizinc tetrauranyl tetraoxo disulfate heptahydrate)
68. Zinkenite (Y: 1826) 2.JB.35a
  (Pb_{9}Sb_{22}S_{42})
69. Zinkosite^{Q} (zinkosite: 1852) 7.AB.10 [no] [no]
  (IUPAC: zinc sulfate)
  Note: possibly a chemical analysis artifact as its occurrence is improbable at the type locality.
70. Zippeite (zippeite: IMA1971-002a Rd) 7.EC.05
  (IUPAC: tripotassium tetrauranyl trioxohydro disulfate trihydrate)
71. Zircon (zircon: old) 9.AD.30
  (IUPAC: zirconium(IV) tetraoxosilicate)
72. Zirconolite (zirconolite-laachite: IMA1989 s.p., 1956 Rd) 4.DH.30
  (IUPAC: calcium zirconium dititanium heptaoxide)
  Zirconolite-laachite: three polytypoids known (2M, 3O, 3T), laachite.
73. Zircophyllite (astrophyllite: IMA1971-047) 9.DC.05
74. Zircosulfate (Y: 1965) 7.CD.50
  (IUPAC: zirconium disulfate tetrahydrate)
75. Zirkelite (fluorite: IMA1989 s.p., 1895 Rd) 4.DL.05
76. Zirklerite^{Q} (Y: 1928) 3.CJ.30
  Note: chemical formula uncertain.
77. Zirsilite-(Ce) (eudialyte: IMA2002-057) 9.CO.10 [no]
78. Zirsinalite (lovozerite: IMA1973-025) 9.CJ.15a
  (IUPAC: hexasodium calcium zirconium octadecaoxohexasilicate)
79. Zlatogorite (nickeline: IMA1994-014) 2.CC.05
  (IUPAC: copper nickel diantimonide)
80. Znamenskyite (IMA2014-026) 2.0 [no] [no]
  (IUPAC: tetralead diindium tridecasulfa tetrabismuthide)
81. Znucalite (IMA1989-033) 5.ED.45
  (IUPAC: calcium undecazinc uranyl icosahydro tricarbonate tetrahydrate)
82. Zodacite (calcioferrite: IMA1987-014) 8.DH.25
  (IUPAC: tetracalcium manganese(IV) tetrairon(IV) tetrahydro hexaphosphate dodecahydrate)
83. Zoharite (djerfisherite: IMA2017-049) 2.0 [no] [no]
84. Zoisite (epidote supergroup) 9.BG.10
  (IUPAC: metal calcium trialuminium heptaoxosilicate tetraoxosilicate oxyhydroxyl)
  1. Zoisite (Y: 1805) 9.BG.10
  2. Zoisite-(Pb) (IMA2021-025) 9.BG.10 [no] [no]
85. Zolenskyite (IMA2020-070) 2.0 [no] [no]
86. Zolotarevite (IMA2020-076) 9.0 [no] [no]
87. Zoltaiite (IMA2003-006) 9.AG.85 [no]
  (IUPAC: barium divanadium(IV) dodecavanadium(III) heptaicosaoxodisilicate)
88. Zorite (IMA1972-011) 9.DG.45
89. Zoubekite (IMA1983-032) 2.HC.35
  (AgPb_{4}Sb_{4}S_{10})
90. Zubkovaite (IMA2018-008) 8.0 [no] [no]
91. Zugshunstite-(Ce) (sulfate-oxalate: IMA1996-055) 10.AB.75
92. Zuktamrurite (phosphide: IMA2013-107) 1.BD. [no] [no]
  (IUPAC: iron diphosphide)
93. Zunyite (Y: 1885) 9.BJ.55
  (IUPAC: tridecaluminium icosaoxopentasilicate octadeca(hydro,fluoro) chloride)
94. Zussmanite (IMA1964-018) 9.EG.35
95. Zvĕstovite-(Zn) (tetrahedrite: IMA2020-061) 2.0 [no] [no]
96. Zvyaginite (seidozerite, lamprophyllite: IMA2013-071) 9.B?. [no]
97. Zvyagintsevite (auricupride: IMA1966-006) 1.AG.10
  (IUPAC: tripalladium lead alloy)
98. Zwieselite (triplite-zwieselite series: IMA2008 s.p., 1841 Rd) 8.BB.10
  (IUPAC: iron(II) manganese(II) fluoro phosphate)
99. Zýkaite (sanjuanite-destinezite: IMA1976-039) 8.DB.45
  (IUPAC: tetrairon(III) hydro triarsenate sulfate pentadecahydrate)
