= List of minerals recognized by the International Mineralogical Association (W–X) =

This list includes those recognised minerals beginning with the letters W and X. The International Mineralogical Association is the international group that recognises new minerals and new mineral names; however, minerals discovered before 1959 did not go through the official naming procedure, although some minerals published previously have been either confirmed or discredited since that date. This list contains a mixture of mineral names that have been approved since 1959 and those mineral names believed to still refer to valid mineral species (these are called "grandfathered" species).

The list is divided into groups:

- Introduction • (Main synonyms)
- A • B • C • D • E • F • G • H • I • J • K • L • M • N • O • P–Q • R • S • T • U–V • W–X • Y–Z

The data was exported from mindat.org on 29 April 2005; updated up to 'IMA2021'.

The minerals are sorted by name, followed by the structural group (rruff.info/ima and ima-cnmnc by mineralienatlas.de, mainly) or chemical class (mindat.org and basics), the year of publication (if it's before of an IMA approval procedure), the IMA approval and the Strunz-mindat code. The first link is to mindat.org, the second link is to webmineral.com, and the third is to the Handbook of Mineralogy (Mineralogical Society of America).

- Abbreviations:
  - ^{D} – discredited (IMA/CNMNC status).
  - ^{Q} – questionable/ doubtful (IMA/CNMNC, mindat.org or mineralienatlas.de status).
  - ^{N} – published without approval of the IMA/CNMNC, or just not an IMA approved mineral but with some acceptance in the scientific community nowadays.
  - ^{I} – intermediate member of a solid-solution series.
  - ^{H} – hypothetical mineral (synthetic, anthropogenic, suspended approval procedure, etc.)
    - ^{ch} – incomplete description, hypothetical solid solution end member.
  - Rd – redefinition of ...
  - "s.p." – special procedure.
  - group – a name used to designate a group of species, sometimes only a mineral group name.
  - no – no link available.
  - IUPAC – chemical name.
  - Y: NNNN – year of publication.
  - Y: old – known before publications were available.

== W ==
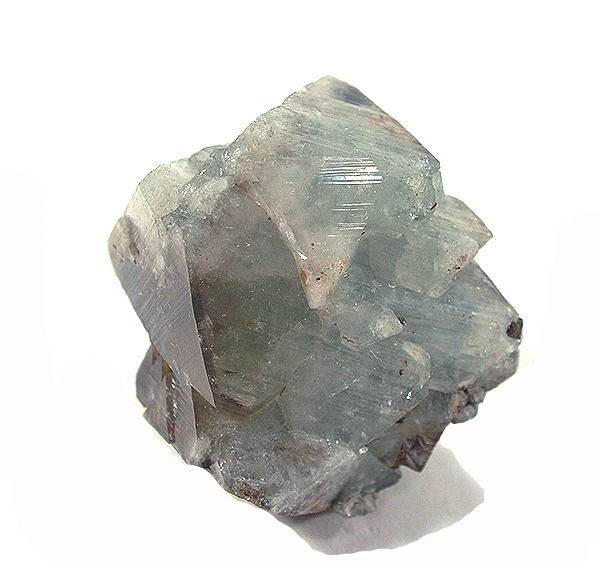
Wardite from Rapid Creek, Dawson Mining District, Yukon Territory, Canada

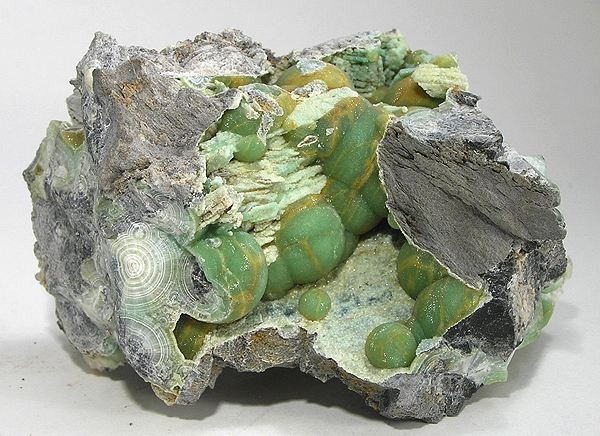
Wavellite from Mauldin Mt., Montgomery County, Arkansas, US

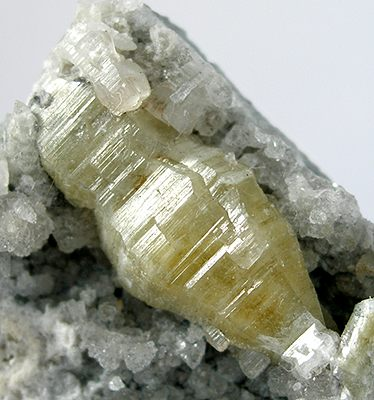
Weloganite from the Francon quarry, Montréal, Québec, Canada

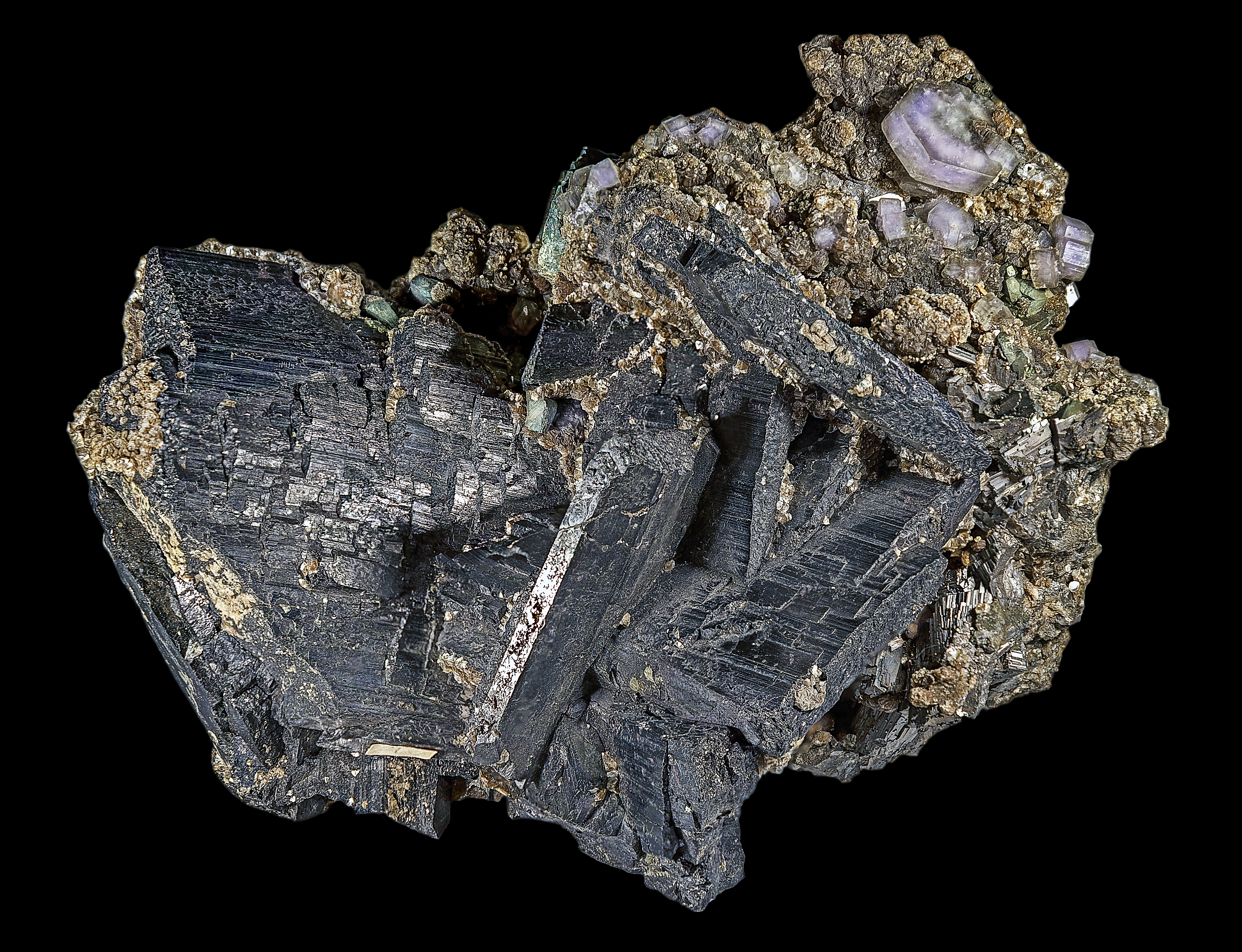
Wolframite

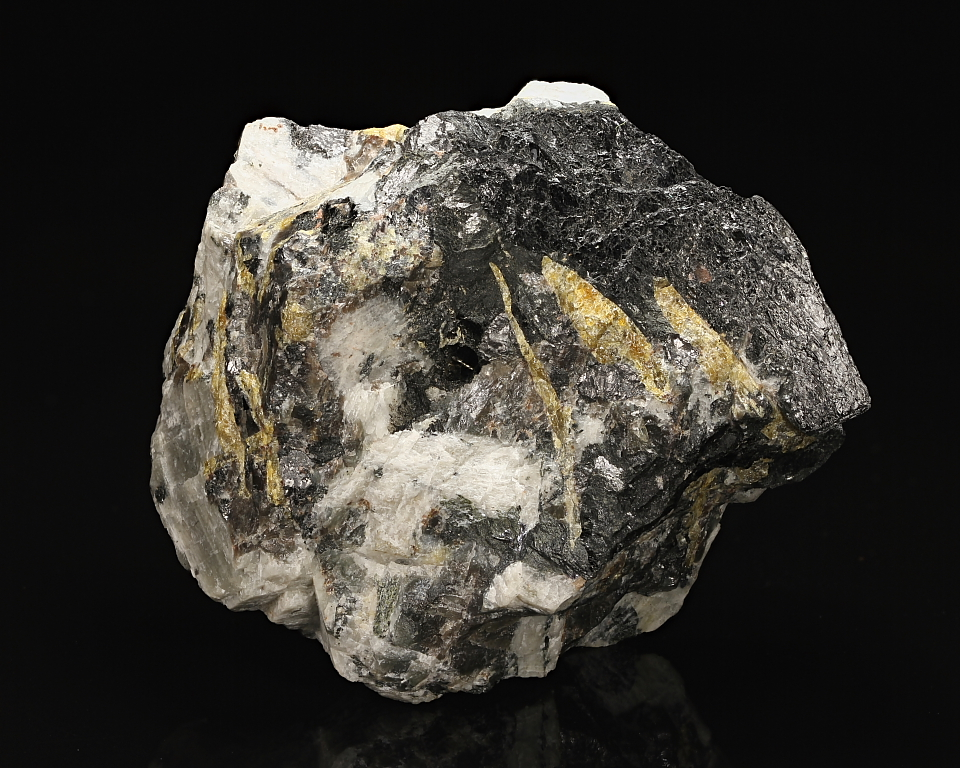
Wöhlerite

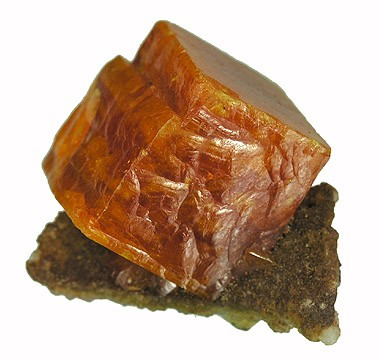
Wulfenite from the Erupción Mine (Ahumada Mine; Erupción-Ahumada Mine), Los Lamentos Mts (Sierra de Los Lamentos), Municipio de Ahumada, Chihuahua, Mexico

1. Wad
2. Wadalite (mayenite: IMA1987-045) 9.AD.25 [no]
  (IUPAC: hexacalcium pentaluminium hexadecaoxodisilicate trichloride)
3. Wadeite (Y: 1939) 9.CA.10
  (IUPAC: dipotassium zirconium (nonaoxotrisilicate))
4. Wadsleyite (IMA1982-012) 9.BE.02
  (IUPAC: dimagnesium tetraoxosilicate)
5. Wagnerite (wagnerite: IMA2003 s.p., 1821 Rd) 8.BB.15
  (IUPAC: dimagnesium fluoro phosphate)
6. Waimirite-(Y) (perovskite: IMA2013-108) 3.0 [no] [no]
  (IUPAC: yttrium trifluoride)
7. Waipouaite (IMA2019-095) 9.0 [no] [no]
8. Wairakite (zeolitic tectosilicate: IMA1997 s.p., 1955) 9.GB.05
  (IUPAC: calcium (dialuminotetrasilicate) dodecaoxy dihydrate)
9. Wairauite (alloy: IMA1964-015) 1.AE.15
  (IUPAC: cobalt iron alloy)
10. Wakabayashilite (IMA1969-024) 2.FA.40
  ((As,Sb)_{6}As_{4}S_{14})
11. Wakefieldite (zircon) 8.AD.35
  (IUPAC: REE vanadate)
  1. Wakefieldite-(Ce) (IMA1969-001) 8.AD.35
  2. Wakefieldite-(La) (IMA1989-035a) 8.AD.35
  3. Wakefieldite-(Nd) (IMA2008-031) 8.AD.35 [no]
  4. Wakefieldite-(Y) (IMA1969-012) 8.AD.35
12. Walentaite (IMA1983-047) 8.CH.05
  (IUPAC: dihydrogen dicalcium hexairon(III) pentarsenate triphosphate tetradecahydrate)
13. Walfordite (tellurite: IMA1996-003) 4.JK.05
14. Walkerite (IMA2001-051) 6.GB.20 [no]
15. Wallisite (hatchite: IMA1971 s.p., 1965) 2.GC.05
  (CuPbTlAs_{2}S_{5})
16. Wallkilldellite 8.DL.20
  1. Wallkilldellite (IMA1982-084) 8.DL.20
    (IUPAC: dicalcium trimanganese(II) tetrahydro diarsenate nonahydrate)
  2. Wallkilldellite-(Fe) (IMA1997-032) 8.DL.20 [no]
    (IUPAC: dicalcium triiron(II) tetrahydro diarsenate nonahydrate)
17. Walpurgite (Y: 1871) 8.EA.05
  (IUPAC: tetra(oxo bismutate) uranyl diarsenate dihydrate)
18. Walstromite (IMA1964-009) 9.CA.25
  (IUPAC: barium dicalcium nonaoxytrisilicate)
19. Walthierite (alunite, alunite: IMA1991-008) 7.BC.10
  (IUPAC: barium hexaaluminium dodecahydro tetrasulfate)
20. Wampenite (IMA2015-061) 10.B?. [no] [no]
21. Wangdaodeite (IMA2016-007) 4.0 [no] [no]
  (IUPAC: iron titanium trioxide)
22. Wardite (wardite: 1896) 8.DL.10
  (IUPAC: sodium trialuminium tetrahydro diphosphate dihydrate)
23. Wardsmithite (IMA1967-030) 6.H0.25
  (IUPAC: pentacalcium magnesium hexa(heptaoxotetraborate) triacontahydrate)
24. Warikahnite (IMA1978-038) 8.CA.35
  (IUPAC: trizinc diarsenate dihydrate)
25. Warkite (sapphirine: IMA2013-129) 4.0 [no] [no]
  (IUPAC: dicalcium hexascandium hexaluminium icosaoxide)
26. Warwickite (warwickite: 1838) 6.AB.20
27. Wassonite (IMA2010-074) 2.CB.
  (IUPAC: titanium(II) sulfide)
28. Watanabeite (IMA1991-025) 2.GC.15
  (Cu_{4}(As,Sb)_{2}S_{5})
29. Watatsumiite (neptunite: IMA2001-043) 9.EH.05 [no]
30. Waterhouseite (IMA2004-035) 8.BE.85
  (IUPAC: heptamanganese octahydro diphosphate)
31. Watkinsonite (watkinsonite: IMA1985-024) 2.HB.20e
  (PbCu_{2}Bi_{4}(Se,S)_{8})
32. Wattersite (IMA1987-030) 7.FB.15
  (IUPAC: di(dimercury) mercury(II) dioxochromate)
33. Wattevilleite^{Q} (Y: 1879) 7.CC.85
  Note: possibly hexahydrite.
34. Wavellite (IMA1971 s.p., 1805) 8.DC.50
  (IUPAC: trialuminium trihydro diphosphate pentahydrate)
35. Wawayandaite (IMA1988-043) 9.HA.20
36. Waylandite (alunite, crandallite: IMA1962-003) 8.BL.13
  (IUPAC: bismuth trialuminium hexahydro diphosphate)
37. Wayneburnhamite (IMA2015-124) 9.B?. [no] [no]
  (IUPAC: nonalead hexacalcium tri(heptaoxodisilicate) tri(tetraoxosilicate))
38. Weberite (Y: 1938) 3.CB.25
  (IUPAC: disodium magnesium heptafluoroaluminate)
39. Weddellite (oxalate: 1936) 10.AB.40
  (IUPAC: calcium oxalate dihydrate)
40. Weeksite (IMA1962 s.p., 1960) 9.AK.30
  (IUPAC: dipotassium diuranyl tridecaoxopentasilicate tetrahydrate)
41. Wegscheiderite (IMA1967 s.p., 1961) 5.AA.30
  (IUPAC: pentasodium trihydrogen tetracarbonate)
42. Weibullite (kobellite: IMA1980 s.p., 1910 Rd) 2.JB.25h
  (Ag_{0.33}Pb_{5.33}Bi_{8.33}(S,Se)_{18})
43. Weilerite (alunite, beudandite: IMA1987 s.p., 1962 Rd) 8.0 [no]
  (IUPAC: barium trialuminium hexahydro sulfate arsenate)
  Note: it is definitely not a synonym of arsenogorceixite as its sulfate content is now known.
44. Weilite (IMA1963-006) 8.AD.10
  (IUPAC: (calcium hydroxoarsenate(V))
45. Weinebeneite (beryllophosphate zeolite: IMA1990-049) 8.DA.20
  (IUPAC: calcium triberyllium dihydro diphosphate tetrahydrate)
46. Weishanite (amalgam: IMA1982-076) 1.AD.20a
  ((Au,Ag)_{1.2}Hg_{0.8})
47. Weissbergite (IMA1975-040) 2.HD.05
  (IUPAC: thallium disulfa antimonide)
48. Weissite (Y: 1927) 2.BA.30
  (Cu_{2−x}Te)
49. Welinite (IMA1966-002 Rd) 9.AF.75
50. Weloganite (IMA1967-042) 5.CC.05
  (IUPAC: disodium tristrontium zirconium hexacarbonate trihydrate)
51. Welshite (sapphirine: IMA1973-019) 9.DH.40
52. Wendwilsonite (IMA1985-047) 8.CG.10
  (IUPAC: dicalcium magnesium diarsenate dihydrate)
53. Wenjiite (phosphide: IMA2019-107c) 1.BO. [no] [no]
54. Wenkite (tectosilicate zeolite: IMA1967 s.p., 1962) 9.GD.25
55. Werdingite (IMA1988-023) 9.BD.35
  (IUPAC: dimagnesium tetralumino tetraboro heptatriacontaoxotetrasilicate)
56. Wermlandite (hydrotalcite: IMA1970-007) 7.DD.35
57. Wernerbaurite (decavanadate: IMA2012-064) 4.0 [no]
58. Wernerkrauseite (post-spinel: IMA2014-008) 4.0 [no] [no]
59. Wesselsite (gillespite: IMA1994-055) 9.EA.05 [no]
  (IUPAC: strontium copper decaoxotetrasilicate)
60. Westerveldite (modderite: IMA1971-017) 2.CC.15
  (IUPAC: iron arsenide)
61. Wetherillite (IMA2014-044) 7.0 [no] [no]
  (IUPAC: disodium magnesium diuranyl tetrasulfate octadecahydrate)
62. Wheatleyite (oxalate: IMA1984-040) 10.AB.30
  (IUPAC: disodium copper oxalate dihydrate)
63. Whelanite (IMA1977-006) 9.0 [no] [no]
64. Wherryite (Y: 1950) 7.BC.55 [no]
  (IUPAC: heptalead dicopper tetrasulfate di(tetraoxosilicate) dihydroxyl)
65. Whewellite (oxalate: IMA1967 s.p., 1852) 10.AB.45
  (IUPAC: calcium oxalate monohydrate)
66. Whitecapsite (IMA2012-030) 7.0 [no]
67. Whiteite (jahnsite, whiteite) 8.DH.15
  (IUPAC: (tri M(II)) dialuminium dihydro diphosphate octahydrate)
  1. Whiteite-(CaFeMg) (IMA1975-001) 8.DH.15
  2. Whiteite-(CaMgMg) (IMA2016-001) 8.DH.15 [no] [no]
  3. Whiteite-(CaMnMg) (IMA1986-012) 8.DH.15
  4. Whiteite-(CaMnMn) (IMA2011-002) 8.DH.15 [no]
  5. Whiteite-(MnFeMg) (IMA78-A) 8.DH.15
  6. Whiteite-(MnMnMg) (IMA2015-092) 8.DH.15 [no] [no]
  7. Whiteite-(MnMnMn) (IMA2021-049) 8.DH.15 [no] [no] [no]
68. Whiterockite (IMA2020-044) 8.0 [no] [no]
69. Whitlockite (whitlockite: 1941) 8.AC.45
  (IUPAC: nonacalcium magnesium hydroxophosphate(V) hexaphosphate)
70. Whitmoreite (arthurite: IMA1974-009) 8.DC.15
  (IUPAC: iron(II) diiron(III) dihydro diphosphate tetrahydrate)
71. Wickenburgite (IMA1968-006) 9.EG.55
  (IUPAC: trilead calcium dialumino heptaicosaoxodecasilicate tetrahydrate)
72. Wickmanite (schoenfliesite: IMA1965-024) 4.FC.10
  (IUPAC: manganese(II) tin(IV) hexahydroxide)
73. Wicksite (wicksite: IMA1979-019) 8.CF.05
74. Widenmannite (IMA1974-008) 5.ED.40
  (IUPAC: dilead dihydro [uranyl dicarbonate])
75. Widgiemoolthalite (IMA1992-006) 5.DA.05
  (IUPAC: pentanickel tetracarbonate dihydro (tetra-penta)hydrate)
76. Wightmanite (IMA1967 s.p., 1962) 6.AB.55
  (IUPAC: pentamagnesium pentahydro oxo(trioxoborate) dihydrate)
77. Wiklundite (IMA2015-057) 4.0 [no] [no]
78. Wilancookite (beryllophosphate zeolite: IMA2015-034) 8.0 [no] [no]
79. Wilcoxite (aubertite: IMA1979-070) 7.DE.45
  (IUPAC: magnesium aluminium disulfate fluoride heptadecahydrate)
80. Wildenauerite (IMA2017-058) 8.0 [no] [no]
81. Wilhelmgümbelite (schoonerite, calcioferrite: IMA2015-072) 8.0 [no] [no]
82. Wilhelmkleinite (IMA1997-034) 8.BB.40
  (IUPAC: zinc diiron(III) dihydro diarsenate)
83. Wilhelmramsayite (lazulite: IMA2004-033) 2.FD.40 [no]
  (IUPAC: tricopper iron trisulfide dihydrate)
84. Wilhelmvierlingite (overite: IMA1982-025) 8.DH.20
  (IUPAC: calcium manganese(II) iron(III) hydro diphosphate dihydrate)
85. Wilkinsonite (sapphirine: IMA1988-053) 9.DH.40
  (IUPAC: tetrasodium [octairon(II) tetrairon(III)] tetraoxo[hexatriacontaoxoicosasilicate]
86. Wilkmanite (IMA1967 s.p., 1964) 2.D0.15
  (IUPAC: trinickel tetraselenide)
87. Willemite (phenakite: 1830) 9.AA.05
  (IUPAC: dizinc tetraoxosilicate)
88. Willemseite (talc: IMA1971 s.p., 1969) 9.EC.05
  (IUPAC: trinickel dihydroxyl decaoxytetrasilicate)
89. Willhendersonite (zeolitic tectosilicate: IMA1981-030) 9.GD.10
  (IUPAC: potassium calcium (trialuminotrisilicate) dodecaoxy pentahydrate)
90. Willyamite (cobaltite: IMA1970 s.p., IMA1969-001a Rd) 2.EB.25
  (IUPAC: cobalt sulfantimonide)
91. Wiluite (vesuvianite: IMA1997-026) 9.BG.35 [no]
92. Winchite [Na-Ca-amphibole: IMA2012 s.p., 1906 Rd] 9.DE.20
93. Windhoekite (palygorskite: IMA2010-083) 9.EE.20 [no] [no]
94. Windmountainite (palygorskite: IMA2018-130a) 9.EE. [no] [no]
95. Winstanleyite (tellurite: IMA1979-001) 4.JK.05
  (IUPAC: titanium tritellurium(IV) octaoxide)
96. Wiserite (Y: 1845) 6.BA.20
97. Witherite (aragonite: 1784) 5.AB.15
  (IUPAC: barium carbonate)
98. Wittichenite (Y: 1853) 2.GA.20
  (IUPAC: tricopper bismuth trisulfide)
99. Wittite^{Q} (Y: 1924) 2.JB.20
  Note: possibly Se-rich cannizzarite.
100. Witzkeite (IMA2011-084) 7.0 [no] [no]
  (IUPAC: tetrasodium tetrapotassium calcium dinitrate tetrasulfate dihydrate)
101. Wodegongjieite (IMA2020-036b)
102. Wodginite (wodginite: IMA1967 s.p., 1963) 4.DB.40
  (IUPAC: manganese(II) tin(IV) ditantalum octaoxide)
103. Wöhlerite (wöhlerite: 1843) 9.BE.17
104. Wolfeite (wagnerite: 1949) 8.BB.15
  (IUPAC: diiron(II) hydro phosphate)
105. Wollastonite (wollastonite: IMA1962 s.p., 1818) 9.DG.05
  (IUPAC: calcium trioxysilicate)
106. Wölsendorfite (wölsendorfite: 1957) 4.GB.30
  (IUPAC: heptalead tetradecauranyl tetrahydro nonadecaoxide dodecahydrate)
107. Wonesite (mica: IMA1979-007a) 9.EC.20
108. Woodallite (hydrotalcite: IMA2000-042) 4.FL.05
  (IUPAC: hexamagnesium dichromium hexadecahydroxide dichloride tetrahydrate)
109. Woodhouseite (alunite, beudandite: IMA1987 s.p., 1937 Rd) 8.BL.05
  (IUPAC: calcium trialuminium hexahydro sulfate phosphate)
110. Woodruffite (Y: 1953) 4.FL.25
  (IUPAC: dizinc penta(manganese(IV),manganese(III)) decaoxide tetrahydrate)
111. Woodwardite (hydrotalcite: 1866) 7.DD.35
112. Wooldridgeite (IMA1997-037) 8.FC.25
  (IUPAC: disodium calcium dicopper(II) dipyrophosphate decahydrate)
113. Wopmayite (whitlockite: IMA2011-093) 8.AC. [no]
114. Wrightite (IMA2015-120) 8.0 [no] [no]
  (IUPAC: dipotassium dialuminium oxodiarsenate)
115. Wroewolfeite (IMA1973-064) 7.DD.10
  (IUPAC: tetracopper hexahydro sulfate dihydrate)
116. Wulfenite (scheelite: 1845) 7.GA.05
  (IUPAC: lead molybdenum tetraoxide)
117. Wulffite (IMA2013-035) 7.0 [no]
  (IUPAC: tripotassium sodium tetracopper dioxo tetrasulfate)
118. Wülfingite (cristobalite: IMA1983-070) 4.FA.10
  (IUPAC: zinc dihydroxide)
119. Wupatkiite (halotrichite: IMA1994-019) 7.CB.85
  (IUPAC: cobalt dialuminium tetrasulfate docosahydrate)
120. Wurtzite (wurtzite: 1861) 2.CB.45
  (IUPAC: zinc sulfide)
121. Wüstite (Y: 1927) 4.AB.25
  (IUPAC: iron(II) oxide)
122. Wumuite (IMA2017-067a) 4.0 [no] [no]
123. Wuyanzhiite (IMA2017-081) 2.0 [no] [no]
124. Wyartite (IMA1962 s.p., 1959) 5.EA.15
  (IUPAC: calcium uranium(V) diuranyl tetraoxyhydro carbonate heptahydrate)
125. Wycheproofite (IMA1993-024) 8.DJ.30
  (IUPAC: sodium aluminium zirconium dihydro diphosphate monohydrate)
126. Wyllieite (alluaudite, wyllieite: IMA1972-015) 8.AC.15
  (NaNaMn(Fe^{+}_{2}Al)(PO_{4})_{3})

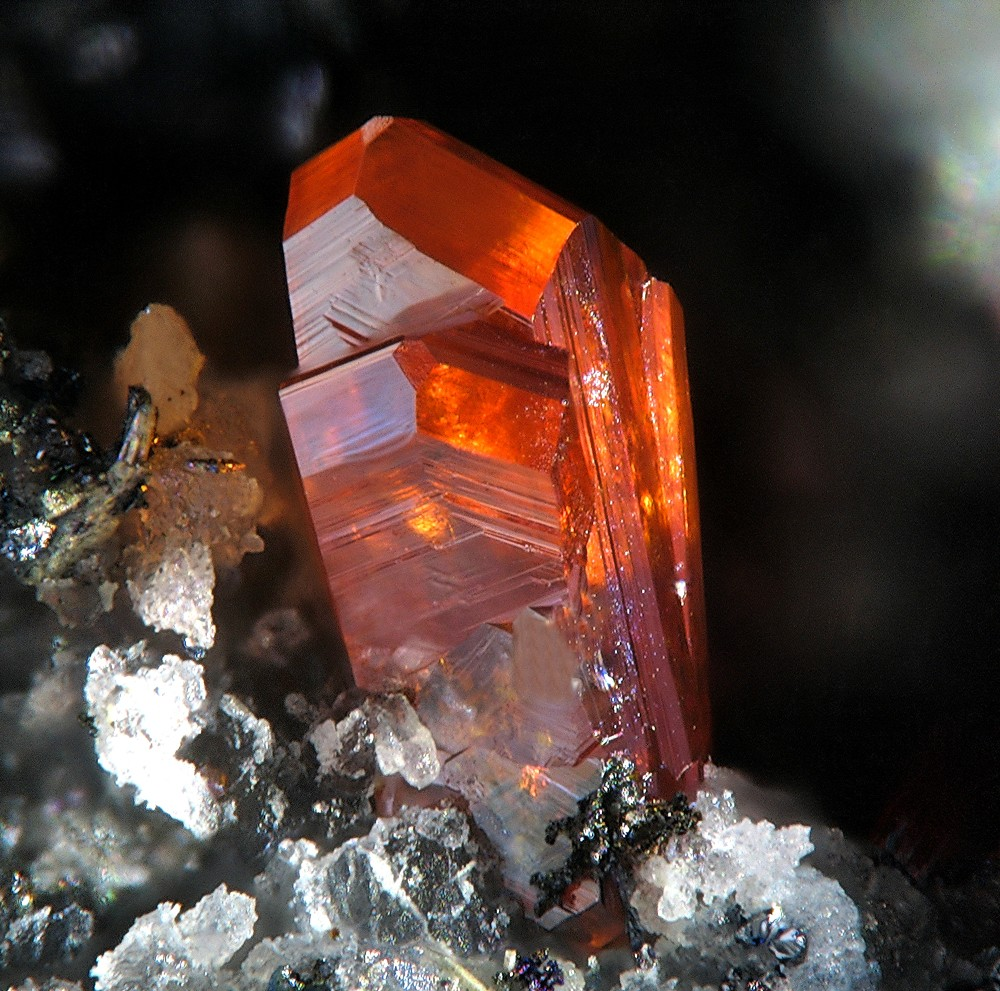
Xanthoconite from the Imiter Mine, Boumalne-Dadès, Ouarzazate Province, Souss-Massa-Draâ Region, Morocco

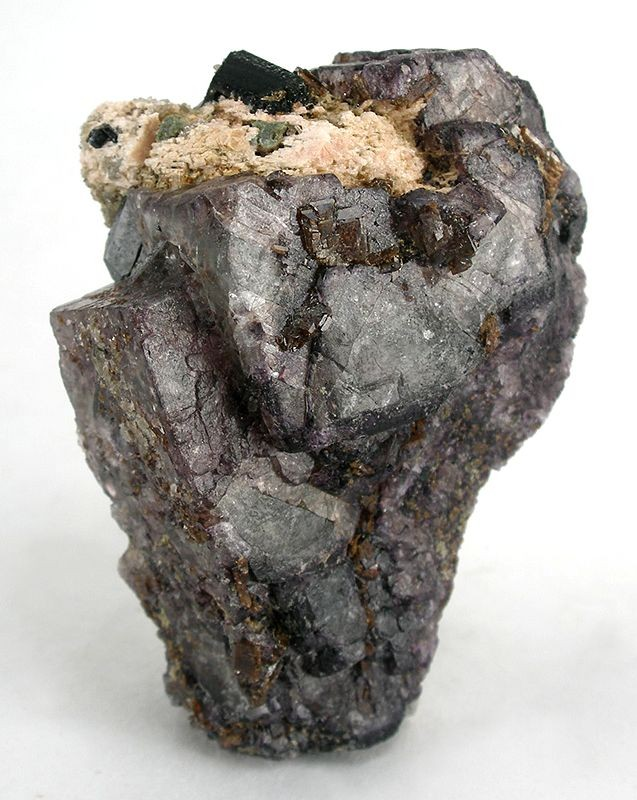
Xenotime-(Y) from Erongo Mountain, Usakos and Omaruru Districts, Erongo Region, Namibia

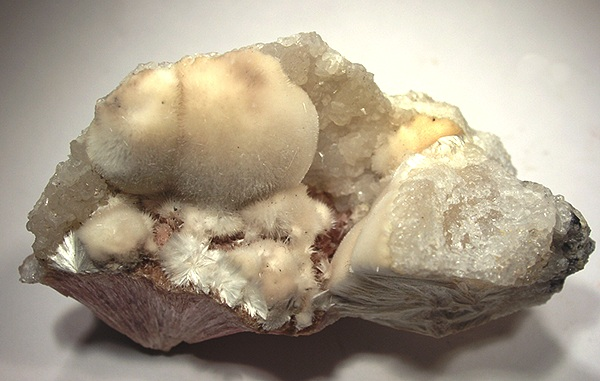
Combination piece with radial fibrous inesite and xonotlite

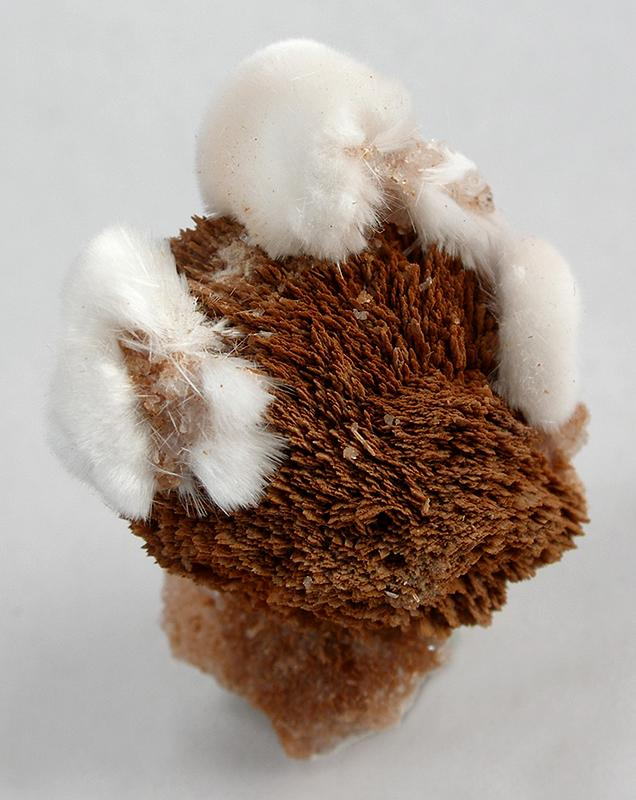
Xonotlite on inesite from the Wessels Mine (Wessel's Mine), Hotazel, Kalahari manganese fields, Northern Cape Province, South Africa

== X ==
1. Xanthiosite (olivine: IMA1965 s.p., 1858 Rd) 8.AB.25
  (IUPAC: trinickel diarsenate)
2. Xanthoconite (Y: 1840) 2.GA.10
  (IUPAC: trisilver trisulfa arsenide)
3. Xanthoxenite (IMA1975-004a, 1920 Rd) 8.DH.40
  (IUPAC: tetracalcium diiron(III) dihydro tetraphosphate trihydrate)
4. Xenophyllite (IMA2006-006) 8.AC.50 [no]
  (IUPAC: tetrasodium heptairon hexaphosphate)
5. Xenotime (zircon) 8.AD.35
  (IUPAC: REE phosphate)
  1. Xenotime-(Y) (IMA1987 s.p., 1832) 8.AD.35
  2. Xenotime-(Yb) (IMA1998-049) 8.AD.35 [no]
6. Xiangjiangite (IMA1982 s.p., 1978) 8.EB.05
  (IUPAC: iron(III) tetrauranyl hydro diphosphate disulfate docosahydrate)
7. Xieite (post-spinel: IMA2007-056) 4.BB.25 [no]
  (IUPAC: iron(II) dichromium tetraoxide)
8. Xifengite (silicide: IMA1983-086) 1.BB.40
  (IUPAC: pentairon trisilicide)
9. Xilingolite (lillianite: IMA1982-024) 2.JB.40a
  (Pb_{3}Bi_{2}S_{6})
10. Ximengite (rhabdophane: IMA1985-004) 8.AD.45
  (IUPAC: bismuth phosphate)
11. Xingzhongite^{Q} (spinel, linnaeite: 1976) 2.DA.05
  Note: possibly cuproiridsite.
12. Xitieshanite (IMA1982-044) 7.DC.20
  (IUPAC: iron(III) chloro sulfate hexahydrate)
13. Xocolatlite (tellurium oxysalt: IMA2007-020) 7.DF.85 [no]
  (IUPAC: dicalcium dimanganese(IV) dodecaoxoditellurate(VI) monohydrate)
14. Xocomecatlite (IMA1974-048) 7.BB.50
  (IUPAC: tricopper tetrahydro tetraoxotellurate(VI))
15. Xonotlite (y: 1866) 9.DG.35
  (IUPAC: hexacalcium heptadecaoxohexasilicate dihydroxyl)
16. Xuwenyuanite (IMA2021-080) [no] [no]
