= Whiteite =

Rare hydrated hydroxyphosphate mineral

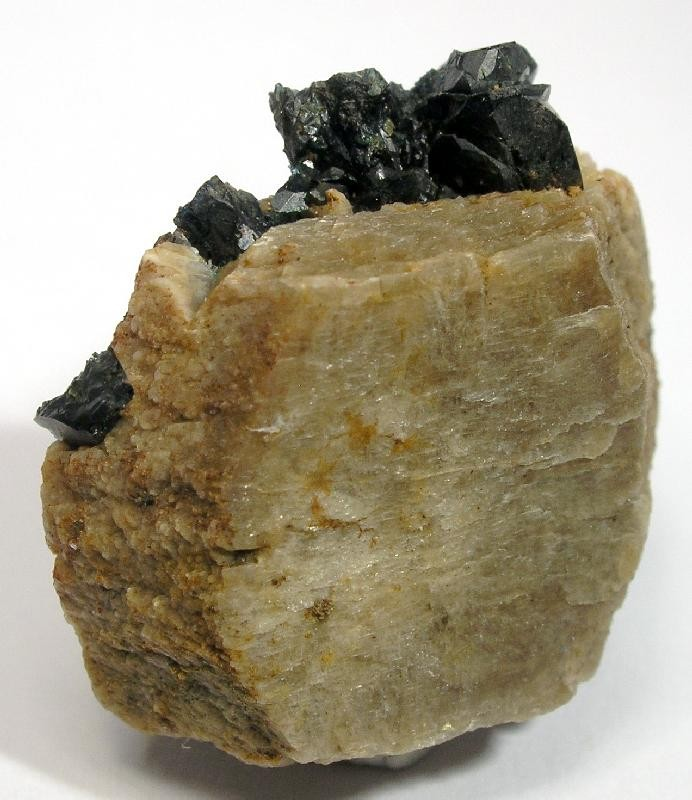
- Whiteite with lazulite from Rapid Creek, Dawson Mining District, the Yukon, Canada

General
- Category: Phosphate minerals
- Formula: Whiteite-(CaFeMg): CaFe^{2+}Mg_{2}Al_{2}(PO_{4})_{4}(OH)_{2}·8H_{2}O; Whiteite-(MnFeMg): Mn^{2+}Fe^{2+}Mg_{2}Al_{2}(PO_{4})_{4}(OH)_{2}·8H_{2}O; Whiteite-(CaMnMg): CaMn^{2+}Mg_{2}Al_{2}(PO_{4})_{4}(OH)_{2}·8H_{2}O
- Strunz classification: 8.DH.15 (10 ed, whole series); 7/D.29 (8 ed)
- Dana classification: 42.11.3.1 Whiteite-(CaFeMg) 42.11.3.2 Whiteite-(MnFeMg) 42.11.3.3 Whiteite-(CaMnMg)
- Crystal system: Monoclinic
- Crystal class: Prismatic (2/m) (same H-M symbol)
- Space group: P2/a (no. 13)

Identification
- Formula mass: Whiteite-(CaFeMg):756.29g Whiteite-(MnFeMg):767.44g Whiteite-(CaMnMg):755.61g
- Color: Whiteite-(CaFeMg): Brown, pink-brown or yellow Whiteite-(MnFeMg): Brown Whiteite-(CaMnMg): Yellow, light lavender or pink
- Crystal habit: Tabular crystals or aggregates thereof
- Twinning: Invariably twinned by reflection on {001} producing a pseudo-orthorhombic appearance
- Cleavage: On {001}. Poor for whiteite-(CaMnMg), but good for the other members of the series (HOM)
- Tenacity: Whiteite-(CaMnMg) is brittle (HOM)
- Mohs scale hardness: 3 to 4
- Luster: Vitreous
- Streak: White to brownish white
- Diaphaneity: Translucent to transparent
- Specific gravity: Whiteite-(CaFeMg) 2.58 Whiteite-(MnFeMg)2.67 Whiteite-(CaMnMg)2.63
- Optical properties: Biaxial (+)
- Refractive index: N_{x} = 1.580, N_{y} = 1.584 to 1.585, N_{z} = 1.590 to 1.591
- Other characteristics: Not radioactive

Whiteite is a rare hydrated hydroxyphosphate mineral.

== Whiteite subgroup ==
The name whiteite refers to three minerals in the jahnsite-whiteite group, whiteite subgroup. Subgroup members (formulae from IMA):

- Whiteite-(CaFeMg), IMA1975-001, CaFe^{2+}Mg_{2}Al_{2}(PO_{4})_{4}(OH)_{2}·8H_{2}O
- Whiteite-(MnFeMg), IMA1978-A, Mn^{2+}Fe^{2+}Mg_{2}Al_{2}(PO_{4})_{4}(OH)_{2}·8H_{2}O
- Whiteite-(CaMnMg), IMA1986-012, CaMn^{2+}Mg_{2}Al_{2}(PO_{4})_{4}(OH)_{2}·8H_{2}O
- Rittmannite, Mn^{2+}Mn^{2+}Fe^{2+}_{2}Al_{2}(PO_{4})_{4}(OH)_{2}·8H_{2}O

In the whiteite formulae, the symbols in brackets indicate the dominant atom in three distinct structural positions, designated X, M(1), and M(2), in that order; for instance, magnesium Mg is always the dominant atom in the M(2) position for all the whiteite minerals. Whiteite was named after John Sampson White Jr (born 1933), associate curator of minerals at the Smithsonian Institution, and founder, editor and publisher (1970–1982) of the Mineralogical Record.

== Unit cell ==
All members of the series belong to the monoclinic crystal system with point group 2/m. Most sources give the space group as P2_{1}/a for the Ca Fe rich member, which was the first of the series to be described, but Dana gives it as P2/a. The other members are variously described in different sources as having space groups P2_{1}/a, P2/a or Pa.

There are two formula units per unit cell (Z = 2). The cell parameters vary slightly between the group members, but to the nearest angstrom they all have a = 15 Å, b = 7 Å and c = 10 Å, with β 112.5 to 113.4. Individual values are:

- Whiteite-(CaFeMg) a = 14.90 Å, b = 6.98 Å, c = 10.13 Å, β = 113.12
- Whiteite-(MnFeMg) a = 14.99 Å, b = 6.96 Å, c = 10.14 Å, β = 113.32
- Whiteite-(CaMnMg) a = 14.842 Å, b = 6.976 Å, c = 10.109 Å, β = 112.59

== Appearance ==
The whiteite minerals are generally brown, pink or yellow, and whiteite-(CaMnMg) may also be light lavender coloured. They are transparent to translucent, with a vitreous luster and a white to brownish white streak. They occur as aggregates of tabular crystals, or thick tabular canoe-shaped crystals. Whiteite from Rapid Creek in the Yukon, Canada, is often associated with deep blue lazulite crystals (33 out of 49 photos on Mindat.org).

== Optical properties ==
The optical class is thought to be biaxial (+), but whiteite-(CaFeMg) may be biaxial (−). The refractive indices are N_{x} = 1.580, N_{y} = 1.584 to 1.585 and N_{z} = 1.590 to 1.591, similar to those for quartz.

== Physical properties ==
Whiteite is invariably twinned, giving the crystals a pseudo-orthorhombic appearance, and the cleavage is good to perfect. Whiteite is quite soft, with hardness 3 to 4, between calcite and fluorite. Its specific gravity is 2.58, similar to that of quartz. Whiteite is not radioactive.

== Occurrence ==
The type locality for whiteite-(CaFeMg)and whiteite-(MnFeMg) is the Ilha claim, Taquaral, Itinga, Jequitinhonha valley, Minas Gerais, Brazil, and for whiteite-(CaMnMg) it is the Tip Top Mine (Tip Top pegmatite), Fourmile, Custer District, Custer County, South Dakota, US. The type material is conserved at the National School of Mines, Paris, France, and at the National Museum of Natural History, Washington DC, US, reference 123013.

At the Lavra da Ilha pegmatite, Taquaral, Brazil, whiteite is found in a complex zoned granite pegmatite associated with eosphorite, zanazziite, wardite, albite and quartz. At Blow River, the Yukon, Canada, it is found in iron-rich sedimentary rocks with siderite, lazulite, arrojadite and quartz. At Ilha de Taquaral, Minas Gerais, Brazil, it occurs along joints and fractures in quartz and albite associated with other phosphates.
