= Chena Hot Springs (thermal mineral springs) =

Thermal springs

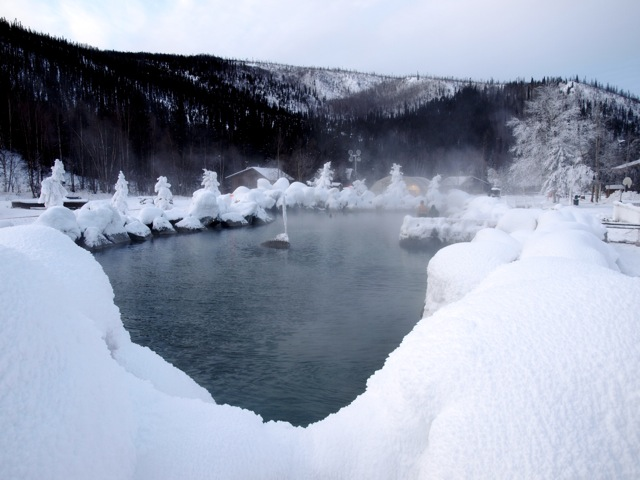
- Interactive map of Chena Hot Springs
- Location: Yukon-Tanana Plateau
- Coordinates: 65°03′11″N 146°03′20″W
- Elevation: 1,200 ft (370 m)
- Type: Geothermal
- Discharge: 165 °F / 74 °C
- Temperature: 153 °F (67 °C)

Chena Hot Springs are a system of thermal mineral springs located within the Yukon-Tanana Plateau near the town of Chena Hot Springs, approximately 50 miles northeast of Fairbanks, Alaska.

The springs consist of several hot soaking pools and a rock-lined warm lake only accessible to those over age 18. There is also a glassed-in indoor 90 °F swimming pool located at an onsite lodge that is powered by a geothermal power plant nearby.

There is now a small 8 person Jacuzzi outdoors heated to the same temperature as the indoor pool. In the winter there is a covered path to the lake.

A rare form of quartz-encrusted zeolite, yugawaralite, was found near Chena Hot Springs. It has also been found near hot springs in Japan and Iceland.

Canadian First Nations peoples and Native Alaskans traditionally used hot springs for healing and bathing. In the early years of the 20th Century, Chena hot springs were used by homesteaders and surveyors.

== Water profile ==
The hot mineral water emerges from the ground at 153 °F / 67 °C. The mineral content of the water includes silica, sodium, iron, potassium, aluminum, carbonate, calcium, magnesium, chloride, bicarbonate, sulfate, fluoride, nitrate, lithium, boric acid and ammonia.

== See also ==
- List of hot springs in the United States
- List of hot springs in the world
