= Kenzō Yagi =

Japanese mineralogist and petrologist (1914–2008)

Kenzō Yagi (八木健三, Yagi Kenzō; 5 September 1914 – 18 July 2008) was a Japanese mineralogist and petrologist who specialized in experimental mineralogy and petrology. Yagiite, a new mineral found in the Colomera meteorite, was named after him for its contribution to the petrology.

== Life ==
Born in Nagano on 5 September 1914, Yagi graduated from the Institute of Mineralogy, Petrology and Economic Geology, Tohoku Imperial University in 1938, where he became assistant professor in 1941. During this period he studied the alkaline rocks of the Morotu District, Sakhalin and Nemuro Peninsula, Hokkaido. He obtained his PhD in 1949, entitled "Research on special rock differentiation phenomena in Karafuto and Hokkaido".

After obtaining his PhD, he received a research grant from the Fulbright Fellowship to conduct post-doctoral research in the United States. After working one year at the Colorado School of Mines, he joined the Geophysical Laboratory as a visiting scientist where he studied of the system FeO-AI_{2}O_{3}-SiO_{2} under the supervision of Norman Levi Bowen. He specialised on experimental petrology and studied alkali pyroxenes.

After returning from the United States, he became professor in 1951 at the Tohoku University. He joined the Hokkaido University in 1962 until his retirement in 1978. He became member of the Japan Science Council in 1971.

He focused his research mainly the experimental study of pyroxene-bearing systems, such as acmite, Titanium-bearing pyroxene, and fassaite, in order to understand the genesis of nephelinitic magma. He also devoted time to study of volcanoes in northeast Honshu and meteorites such as the Yamato meteorites found in Antarctica.

After his retirement, Yagi taught at Hokusei Gakuen University from 1978 to 1988. He also became the chairman of the Hokkaido Nature Conservation Society and worked on conservation on Shiretoko National Park. In 1996, he filed a lawsuit to stop the construction of the Shihoro Kogen Road in Daisetsuzan National Park Tatsuya Hori, Hokkaido governor at the time. Construction was finally canceled with the support of the former Environment Agency director Takeichi Oishi. At the 1998 Nagano Winter Olympics, he opposed extending the men's downhill course to protect the environment.

Yagi Ridge, a mountain ridge in Mount Edziza Provincial Park of British Columbia, Canada, is named after him. Yagi had been to this area in 1966.
