= Yingjiangite =

Fluorescent yellow mineral

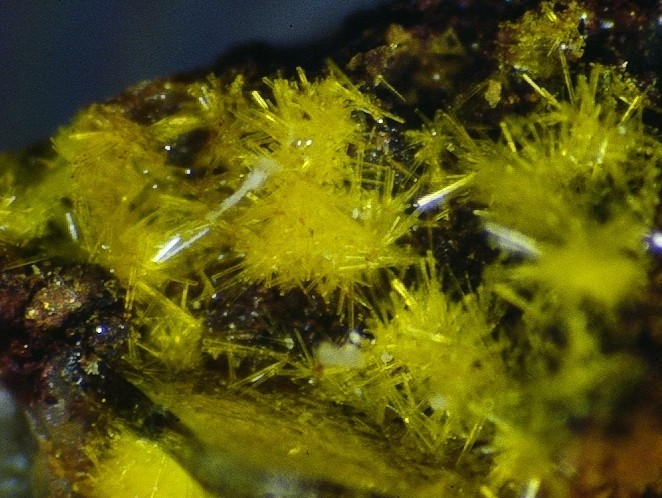

General
- Category: Minerals
- Formula: K_{2}Ca(UO_{2})_{7}(PO4)_{4}(OH)_{6} · 6H_{2}O
- IMA symbol: Yin
- Strunz classification: 8.EC.10
- Dana classification: 42.6.12.1
- Crystal system: Orthorhombic
- Crystal class: Dipyramidal; H-M Symbol: mmm (2/m 2/m 2/m)
- Unit cell: 3,747.21

Identification
- Color: Yellow, golden yellow
- Cleavage: None observed
- Tenacity: Brittle
- Mohs scale hardness: 3 - 4
- Luster: Subadamantine, subvitreous, resinous
- Streak: Yellow to pale yellow
- Specific gravity: 4.15
- Density: 4.15
- Optical properties: Biaxial (-)
- Refractive index: n_{α} = 1.666 - 1.669 n_{β} = 1.692 - 1.703 n_{γ} = 1.707 - 1.710
- Birefringence: 0.041
- Pleochroism: Visible
- 2V angle: Measured: 36°- 38° Calculated: 36°
- Dispersion: r > v or r < v
- Extinction: Parallel
- Ultraviolet fluorescence: Fluorescent
- Common impurities: Na, Mg, Mn, Fe, Ti, Si
- Other characteristics: Radioactive

Yingjiangite is a mineral named after its type locality in the Yingjiang county in 1990. It is a member of the phosphuranylite group.

== Chemistry ==
The mineral is closely related to phosphuranylite group, with some geologists suggesting, the two mineral species may indeed be identical.

== Properties ==
This mineral has pleochroic attributes, which is an optical phenomenon that makes the mineral seem to be a different color depending on the axis it is inspected on. On the x axis, the mineral seems to be almost colorless, on the y it is pale yellow, and on the z it can be seen as a yellow mineral. It is also fluorescent, meaning that it emits light when exposed to a certain type of light (in most cases ultraviolet), or either when it absorbs electromagnetic radiation. The fluorescent attribute of is due to the mineral being uranium based. Both under short and long UV light, it emits a weak yellow green light. Yingjiangite grows in acicular crystals up to a millimeter. It forms aggregates, made of clusters or several individual crystals. It has a fine-grained coating and yellow crusts. A common finding place for the mineral is in uranium deposits, especially in oxidized zones, as it is a uranium and oxygen-based mineral. It is a secondary product in these mines, which in most of the cases contain uraninite and uranothorite. Yingjiangite mostly consists of uranium (63.90%) and oxygen (25.77%), but otherwise includes phosphorus (4.75%), potassium (4.50%), hydrogen (0.70%) and calcium (0.38%). Due to the high uranium concentration of the mineral, it has a very strong, 4,679,034.10 radioactivity measured in Gamma Ray American Petroleum Institute Units. The concentration per GRapi unit of the mineral is 213.72.
