= Zincoberaunite =

Hydrous phosphate mineral

General
- Category: Phosphate minerals
- Formula: ZnFe^{3+}_{5}(OH)_{5}(PO_{4})_{4}·6H_{2}O
- IMA symbol: Zbru
- Strunz classification: 8.DC.27
- Crystal system: Monoclinic
- Crystal class: Prismatic (2/m) (same H-M symbol)
- Space group: C2/c
- Unit cell: a = 20.837(2) Å, b = 5.1624(4) Å, c = 19.250(1) Å; β = 93.252(5)°

Identification
- Color: Light gray, light greenish yellow
- Crystal habit: Fiber, capillary or prismatic microcrystals
- Mohs scale hardness: 3–4
- Luster: VSilky, vitreous
- Diaphaneity: Translucent
- Specific gravity: 2.94
- Optical properties: Biaxial (+)
- Refractive index: n_{α} = 1.745 n_{β} = 1.760 n_{γ} = 1.770
- Birefringence: δ = 0.025
- 2V angle: Measured: 80°

Aggregates of sperlingite crystals associated with sprays of zincoberaunite needles. Brown staining on sperlingite is mitridatite.

Zincoberaunite is an iron and zinc phosphate mineral, the Zn analogue of beraunite. It was first described by Chukanov et al. for an occurrence in Hagendorf Sud pegmatite in Germany. Zincoberaunite occurs as a secondary mineral as an alteration product of primary phosphate minerals in granite pegmatites.

Beraunite crystallizes in the monoclinic crystal system with point group 2/m. Beraunite's formula is Zn Fe^{3+}_{5}(OH)_{5}(PO_{4})_{4}·4H_{2}O.

== Occurrence ==
Zincoberaunite has been located so far in two localities in the world, the type locality, and Krasno, near Horní Slavkov (Czech Republic). It appears in two paragenesis, as an alteration of other phosphates in pegmatites: in one with jungle, phosphophyllite and mitridatite and in another with flurlite, plimerite, beraunite rich in zinc, schoonerite, parascholzite, robertsite and altered phosphophyllite. However, it is likely that a detailed study of the zinc-rich beraunite specimens will allow locating other localities for the zincoberaunite.

== Physical and chemical properties ==
Zincoberaunite contains Zn instead of ferrous iron. Before it was characterized as an independent species, specimens with a high zinc content had been found, but since the iron content was higher, they had been considered as varieties. In addition to the elements indicated in the formula, it contains small amounts of magnesium and calcium. In the type locality it appears as pale gray capillary microcrystals forming silky-looking aggregates. In a second locality it has been found as prismatic microcrystals with compositional zoning.
