= Wilancookite =

Very rare and complex beryllium phosphate

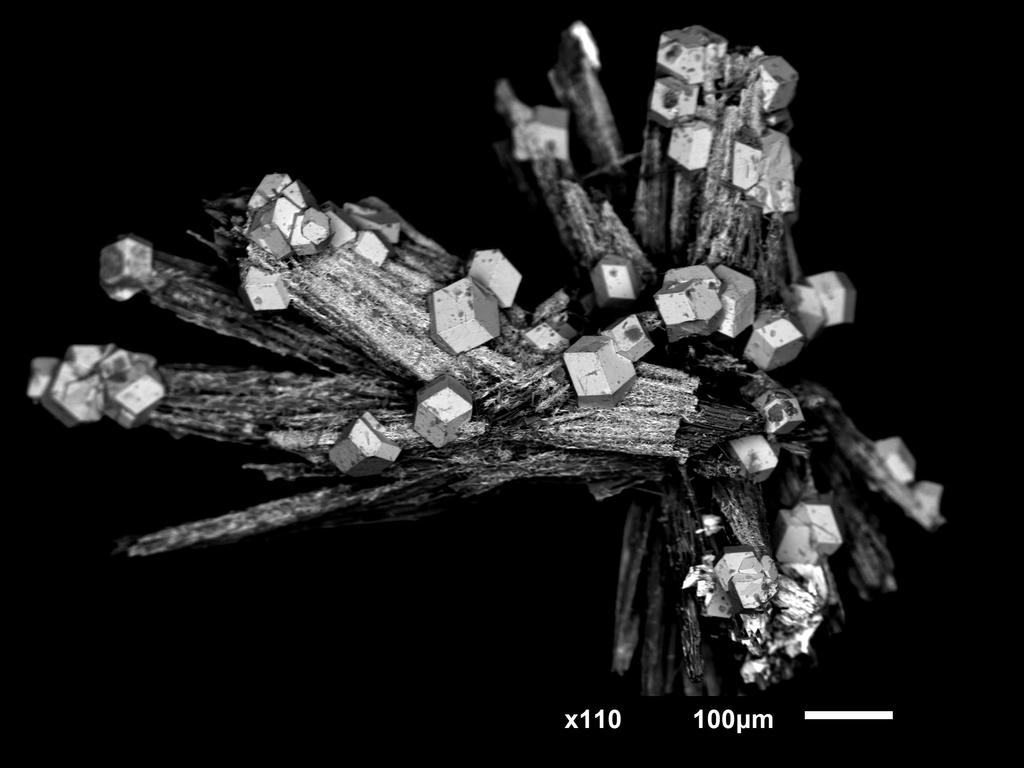
- Wilancookite from Ponte do Piauí claim, Piauí valley, Taquaral, Itinga, Jequitinhonha valley, Minas Gerais, Brazil

General
- Category: Phosphate
- Formula: (Ba,K,Na)_{8}(Ba,Li,[ ])_{6}Be_{24}P_{24}O_{96}·32H_{2}O
- IMA symbol: Wck
- Crystal system: Isometric
- Crystal class: Tetartoidal (23); H-M symbol: (23)
- Space group: I23
- Unit cell: a = 13.54 Å (approximated)

Identification

Wilancookite is a very rare and complex beryllium phosphate with the chemical formula (Ba,K,Na)_{8}(Ba,Li,[ ])_{6}Be_{24}P_{24}O_{96}·32H_{2}O. Wilancookite was discovered in pegmatite of the Lavra Ponte do Piauí complex, Jequitinhonha, Minas Gerais, Brazil.

== Relation to other minerals ==
Wilancookite is related to pahasapaite, a lithium-bearing beryllium phosphate mineral.
