= Yagiite =

Cyclosilicate mineral

General
- Category: cyclosilicates
- Formula: NaMg_{2}(AlMg_{2}Si_{12})O_{30}
- IMA symbol: Yag
- Crystal system: Hexagonal, dipyramidal dihexagonal
- Crystal class: 9.CM.05 (Strunz)

Identification
- Formula mass: 1991.71
- Color: colourless
- Crystal habit: Interstitial in a silicate inclusion surrounded by nickel-iron
- Mohs scale hardness: 5 a 6 (Mohs)
- Lustre: vitreous
- Diaphaneity: semitransparent
- Density: 2.70 g/cm^{3}
- Pleochroism: low, blue to colourless

Yagiite is a cyclosilicate mineral belonging to the osumilite group. It was discovered in 1968 in the iron meteorite that fell in Colomera in the province of Granada (Spain). Named after the Japanese mineralogist Kenzo Yagi, its CAS Registry Number is IMA1968-020.

== Crystal structure and properties ==
It is an anhydrous aluminosilicate of sodium and magnesium, which crystallizes in the hexagonal crystalline system with silicate tetrahedra arranged in double rings. In addition to the elements of its formula, it usually carries impurities: such as titanium, chromium, iron, manganese and calcium.

== Locations ==
Found only as an inclusion of silicate inside the iron meteorite of Colomera (Spain), in which yagiite has crystallized in an environment rich in magnesium and associated with other minerals such as diopside, whitlockite, tridymite, plagioclase of the type albite-anorthite, as well as iron-nickel alloys.
