= Wöhlerite =

Silicate mineral

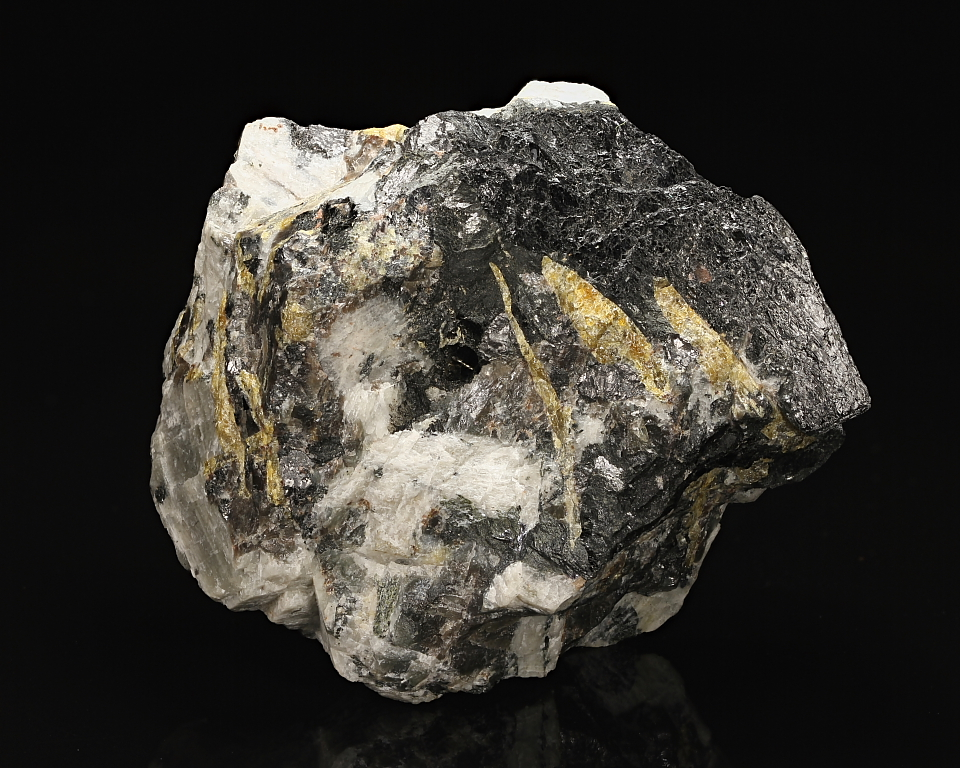

General
- Category: Minerals
- Formula: NaCa_{2}(Zr,Nb)(Si_{2}O_{7})(O,OH,F)_{2}
- IMA symbol: Wöh
- Strunz classification: 9.BE.17
- Dana classification: 56.2.4.5
- Crystal system: Monoclinic
- Crystal class: H-M Symbol: 2 Sphenoidal
- Space group: P2_{1}
- Unit cell: 764.21

Identification
- Color: Honey yellow, wine yellow to sulfur yellow, light to dark yellow, brown, gray
- Twinning: Twin planes common on {010}
- Cleavage: Distinct on {010} Poor on {100}, {110}
- Fracture: Irregular, uneven, splintery
- Tenacity: Brittle
- Mohs scale hardness: 5.5 – 6
- Luster: Vitreous
- Streak: Pale yellow
- Diaphaneity: Transparent, translucent
- Specific gravity: 3.40 – 3.44
- Optical properties: Biaxial (−)
- Refractive index: n_{α} = 1.700 – 1.705 n_{β} = 1.716 – 1.720 n_{γ} = 1.726 – 1.728
- Birefringence: 0.026
- Pleochroism: Weak
- 2V angle: Measured: 70°–77° Calculated: 70° to 76°
- Dispersion: Weak r > v
- Ultraviolet fluorescence: None

Wöhlerite, also known as woehlerite or wohlerite, is a member of the Wöhlerite group. It was named after German chemist Friedrich Wöhler. It was first described by Scheerer in 1843, but the crystal structure was only solved by Mellino & Merlino in 1979. Once approved, it was grandfathered by the IMA.

== Properties ==
Wöhlerite shows pleochroic attributes, which is an optical phenomenon. Depending on which axis the mineral is being viewed, it would appear as if it is changing colors. Looking at the mineral from the x and y axis, it appears as a nearly colorless to pale yellow one, while viewing it on the z axis, it takes on a wine-yellow color. It is a granular mineral, and has prismatic crystals that can grow up to 3 cm. It is thick and tabular on {100}. Brøgger listed these forms to be the more frequent ones are {210}, {130}, {120}, {110}, {101}, {100}, {011}, {001}, {-101} and {-111} in 1890, although other forms observed include {720}, {311}, {121}, {111}, {021}, {012}, {010}, {-121}, {-161}, {-201}, {-211}, {-212} and {-221}. It has a paragenetic mode of syenites. Some of the associated minerals include zircon, microcline, nepheline, spreustein (natrolite after nepheline or sodalite), and the pyrochlore group. It is an accessory mineral in nepheline syenites, and in fenites it is associated with alkaline intrusives. In late phase it can be found in alkalic pegmatites, and it can also be found in carbonatites. It mainly consists of oxygen (35.22%) and calcium (19.26%) but otherwise includes silicon (14.21%), zirconium (11.54%), niobium (9.40%), sodium (5.82%), fluorine (2.88%) and iron (1.41%). The fracture of it is brittle and splintery, meaning that the brittle fracture leaves splintery crystal fragments. Since it is granular, it occurs in matrix in anhedral to subhedral crystals. It is a prismatic and tabular mineral as mentioned above, meaning crystal shape is typically a slender prism, and its dimensions are thin in one direction. Upon inspecting it under both long wave and short wave ultraviolet light, the mineral does not show luminescent properties. It is also not radioactive.

== Formation and mining ==
The type locality is Løvøya, Norway. It was first described from several syenite pegmatites by Scheerer, and although the type locality is unknown, the island became listed as the type locality since it was mentioned by Scheerer. Although it is described for mainly appearing in alkalic rocks, there are reports of wöhlerite's carbonatite occurrence. This rare mineral occurs in calcite-silicate rocks with varying composition. The composition of the host rocks vary due to their heterogeneous nature. The mixed rocks form the complex's western margin of the central sövitic carbonatite intrusion. They are representing the intrusion's magmatic border facies.
