= Wardite =

Hydrated phosphate mineral

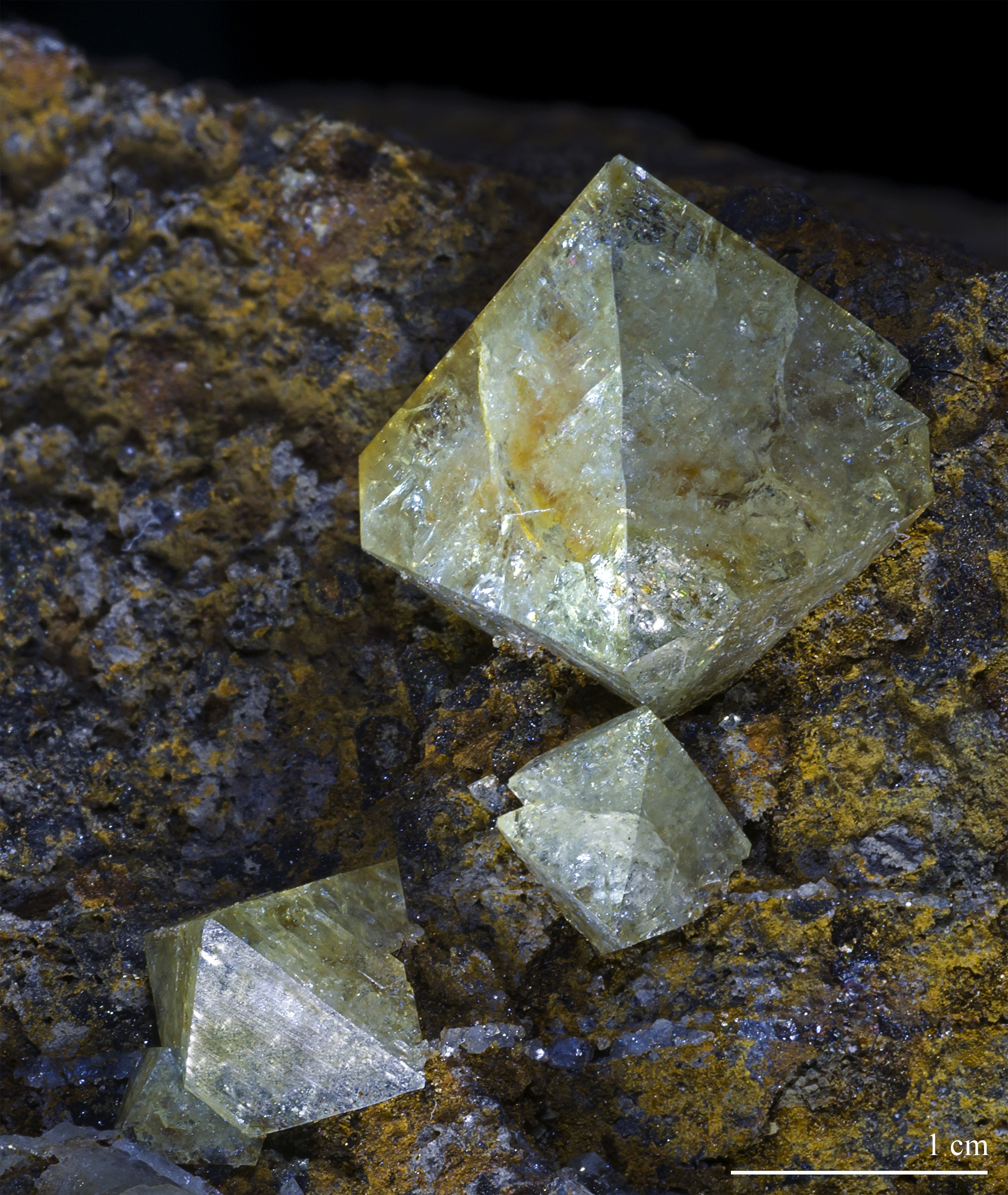
- Wardite from Rapid Creek – Yukon, Canada

General
- Category: Phosphate minerals
- Formula: NaAl_{3}(PO_{4})_{2}(OH)_{4}·2(H_{2}O)
- IMA symbol: Wd
- Strunz classification: 8.DL.10
- Crystal system: Tetragonal
- Crystal class: Trapezohedral (422); H-M symbol: (4 2 2)
- Space group: P4_{1}2_{1}2
- Unit cell: a = 7.03(1), c = 19.04(1) Å; Z = 4

Identification
- Color: White, colorless, pale green, blue-green, yellow-green, pale yellow, yellow pink.
- Crystal habit: Dipyramidal pseudo-octahedral crystals, striated; radial, fibrous, encrustations
- Cleavage: Perfect on {001}
- Mohs scale hardness: 5
- Luster: Vitreous
- Diaphaneity: Transparent to opaque
- Specific gravity: 2.81–2.87
- Optical properties: Uniaxial (+)
- Refractive index: n_{ω} = 1.586 – 1.594 n_{ε} = 1.595 – 1.604
- Birefringence: δ = 0.009
- 2V angle: 0.0

Wardite is a hydrous sodium aluminium phosphate hydroxide mineral with formula: NaAl_{3}(PO_{4})_{2}(OH)_{4}·2(H_{2}O). Wardite is of interest for its rare crystallography. It crystallizes in the tetragonal trapezohedral class and is one of only a few minerals in that class. Wardite forms vitreous green to bluish green to white to colorless crystals, with pyramidal {102} or {114} faces and with {001} usually present masses. Also appears as fibrous encrustations. It has a Mohs hardness of 5 and a specific gravity of 2.81–2.87.

Wardite was named for Henry Augustus Ward (1834–1906) of the University of Rochester in New York. It first described in 1896 for an occurrence in Clay Canyon, Fairfield, Utah County, Utah, US.

== Occurrence ==
It occurs with variscite in phosphate nodules and occurs uncommonly in pegmatites and phosphate deposits through alteration of amblygonite.

Wardite is a rare mineral, which has been found in approximately 70 locations worldwide, but generally on a microscopic scale, with only a few occurrences of significant specimens. The finest specimens, boasting crystals up to 4 cm in size, originate from Rapid Creek and the Big Fish River in the Dawson mining district, Alaska (USA). Good quality specimens, measuring up to 1 cm, have also been discovered in Lavra da Ilha, Taquaral, Itinga, Minas Gerais, Brazil. In Spain, it appears in the form of crystals up to 1 cm found in cavities within montebrasite at the Tita mine in Golpejas, Salamanca.

== See also ==
- List of minerals
- List of minerals named after people
