= Zanazziite =

Complex hydrated phosphate mineral

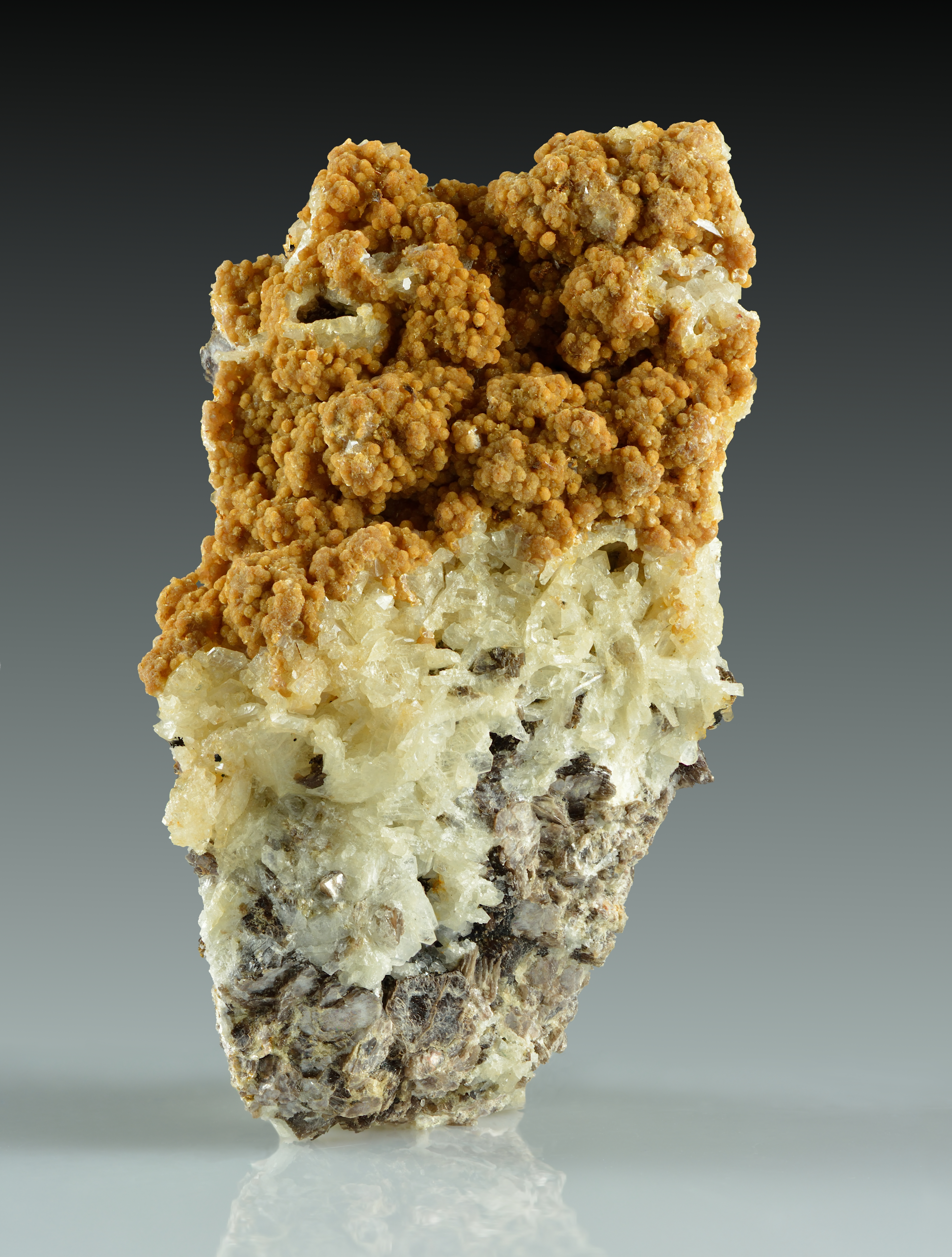
- Brown crystallized zanazziite on the matrix

General
- Category: Phosphate minerals
- Formula: Ca_{2}(Mg,Fe)(Mg,Fe,Mn,Al)_{4}Be_{4}(OH)_{4}(PO_{4})_{6}·6H_{2}O
- IMA symbol: Zan
- Strunz classification: 8.DA.10
- Crystal system: Monoclinic
- Crystal class: Prismatic (2/m) (same H-M symbol)
- Space group: C2/c

Identification
- Formula mass: 1,044.11 g/mol
- Color: Pale to dark olive green
- Crystal habit: Bladed, columnar, prismatic
- Cleavage: Good on [100], distinct on [010]
- Fracture: Brittle
- Mohs scale hardness: 5
- Luster: Vitreous – pearly
- Streak: White
- Diaphaneity: Transparent to translucent
- Specific gravity: 2.76
- Optical properties: Biaxial (+)
- Refractive index: n_{α} = 1.606(2) n_{β} = 1.610 n_{γ} = 1.620
- Dispersion: r < v
- Ultraviolet fluorescence: None

Zanazziite is a complex hydrated phosphate mineral from the roscherite group. It is a magnesium beryllium phosphate mineral. Zanazziite arises as barrel-shaped crystals and can reach up to 4 mm. It grows alongside quartz minerals. It is found in the crevices of Lavra da Ilha pegmatite, near Taquaral, in northeastern Minas Gerais, Brazil. Zanazziite is named after Pier F. Zanazzi. Zanazziite has an ideal chemical formula of Ca_{2}Mg_{5}Be_{4}(PO_{4})_{6}(OH)_{4}·6H_{2}O.

== Composition ==
Zanazziite was recently analyzed with an ARL-SEMQ microprobe; the values were Durango apatite for P, Rockport fayalite for Mn, and Kakanui hornblende for all others. In a separate sample, beryllium was 84.93 mg by atomic absorption spectrophotometry. To determine water an H analyzer was used on duplicate samples of about 25 mg. FeO was determined by titration. The spectroscopic analysis and other microprobes revealed P_{2}O_{5}, 39.27, SiO_{2} 0.36, Al_{2}O_{3} 1.54, Fe_{2}O_{3} 0.76, CaO 10.65, MgO 11.66, FeO 9.63, MnO 1.77, BeO 9.81, H_{2}O 13.32, total of 98.77. Zanazziite belongs to the roscherite-group. The roscherite-group nomenclature is based on the dominant cation in the Me-site; valid species include: Roscherite ($\ce{Mn^2+}$), Zanazziite ($\ce{Mg^2+}$) and Greifensteinite ($\ce{Fe^2+}$). The chemical relationship among all of the minerals in the roscherite group rely on a common formula (roscherite) Ca_{2}Mn_{5}Be_{4}(PO_{4})_{6}(OH)_{4}·6H_{2}O, in which the Mn site can be occupied by other cations previously mentioned.

== Structure ==
Zanazziite belongs to the monoclinic space group C2/c. X-ray diffraction showed the strongest lines in Å, with intensities and indices: 9.50 (90) (110), 5.91 (100) (020), 3.16 (70) (330), 3.05 (50) (510), 2.766 (50) (240), 2.682 (40b) (600), 2.208 (40), 1.642 (50b). X-ray diffraction analyzed cations sharing on octahedral sites. Uncertainty in analyzing zanazziites distribution of cations on M1 and M2 sites. The M2 site in zanazziite is indistinct; it contains two Me-O bond distances, and two Me-OH bond distances. The crystal structure and monoclinic symmetry of the cell data edge lengths: a=15.876A, b=11.860A, c=6.607A, and angle: beta=95.49 degrees. The axial ratio of zanazziite is a=1.3391 b=1 and c=0.5571. The biaxial orientation of the extinction angles: $X=b; Z^a=3$ degrees, angles: $\alpha=1.606, \beta=1.610, \gamma=1.620$, optical axis angle: 2V which was measured = 72 degrees and 2V which was calculated = 65 degrees. In X-ray scattering and diffraction models the data presents an approximation of the number of electrons in each atomic site, giving 17.3 e- in the M2 site and 64.8 e- in the M1 site.

The crystals in Zanazziite are prismatic to bladed, usually rough, barrel-shaped, with indices {100}, {110} and {001}. Cleavages are on {100} good, and {010} distinct.

== Physical properties ==
Zanazziite is usually pale green and occasionally dark green. It is a 5 on the Mohs hardness scale. Optically biaxial +, ex = 1.606, 13 =1.610, "y = 1.620, 2V, = 72°(65° calc) X = b, Z:[100] 3° in obtuse 13; and the density = 2.76 measured, 2.77 calculated. Zanazziite has a vitreous luster, slightly pearly on the cleavage surfaces. Its cleavage is {100} good, {010} distinct. Zanazziite is nonfluorescent in longwave or shortwave ultraviolet light. Zanazziite also shares many physical properties with roscherite.

== Geologic occurrence ==
The roscherite analog zanazziite was found in Lavar da Ilha deposits in Minas Gerais, Brazil. Zanazziite grows usually along the surface of quartz minerals. It occurs in pegmatite in beds of the Jequitinhonha river valley. The pegmatite consists of a wall zone rich in feldspar and muscovite, and a quartz core. The core margin has small pockets and crevices which contain quartz crystals and a number of phosphate minerals (on which the roscherite minerals accumulate). This is special to quartz and phosphate due to the rich locality of Minas Gerais. Minas Gerais contains the world's most diverse concentration of complex granitic pegmatites. This region is responsible for the production of gem beryl, chrysoberyl, topaz, tourmaline, and kunzite.

== See also ==
- List of minerals
- List of minerals named after people
