= Yugawaralite =

Pinkish zeolite mineral

Yugawaraite
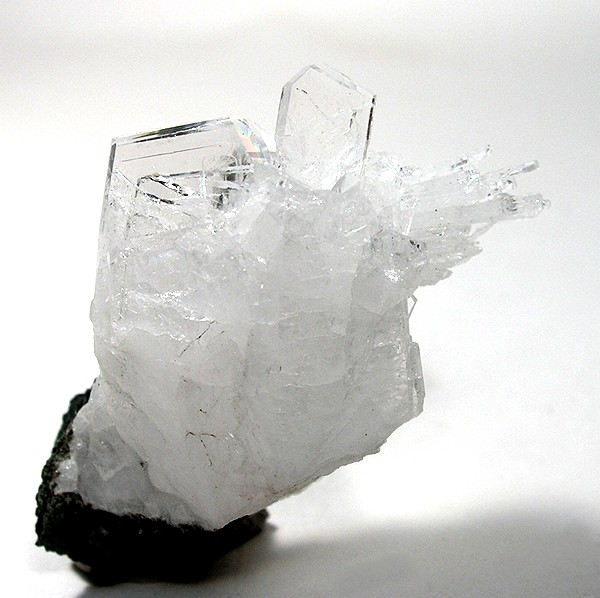

General
- Category: Tectosilicate minerals
- Group: Zeolite group
- Formula: CaAl_{2}Si_{6}O_{16} · 4H_{2}O
- Crystal system: Monoclinic

Identification
- Color: Colorless, pink, or white
- Cleavage: Poor, indistinct
- Tenacity: Very brittle
- Mohs scale hardness: 4.5-5
- Luster: Vitreous, pearly
- Streak: White

Yugawaralite is a clear or pinkish mineral of the zeolite group. It was first described by Sakurai and Hayashi (1952) near a waterfall by some hot springs near Yugawara.

== Etymology ==
Yugawaralite is named after the town Yugawara, where it was found.

== Properties ==
Yugawaralite is piezoelectric and pyroelectric.

== Location ==
Yugawaralite is found in geothermally active areas such as Japan. In Japan, yugawaralite is found on Honshu, where Yugawara is the type locality. In India, it is found in small amounts. Other locations where it has been found is Washington, Alaska, Yellowstone National Park, British Columbia, Iceland, Sardinia, and Reunion island.

=== Alaska ===
In Alaska, yugawaralite is found about 40 miles (64 km) east of Fairbanks, Alaska. In this site, yugawaralite has been recorded up to 8 millimetres (0.31 in) long.

=== Japan ===
In Yugawara, the crystals are found at Fudō Falls in a layer of the Neogene.
