= Zeolite occurrences in Idaho =

Mines in Idaho, USA

- Zeolite occurrences in Idaho
- Location: Pinehurst: Pinehurst; Squaw Creek: Riggins; Sinker Creek: Murphy; Lucky Peak Dam: Ada County; Gardena: Gardena
- Products: Zeolites

Zeolites are found in several locations in southern and central Idaho.

== Pinehurst ==
The Pinehurst Zeolite Occurrence is located in central Idaho. It is known for producing analcime, apophyllite, calcite, chabazite, copper, cowlesite, erionite, gyrolite, heulandite, levyne, mesolite, offretite, phillipsite, stilbite, tacharanite, thomsonite, and tobermorite. The zeolites here occur in small vugs within the Columbia River Basalt.

== Squaw Creek ==
The Squaw Creek Zeolite Occurrence, also known as the Riggins Paulingite Locality (though the exact phrasing can vary), is in central Idaho. It is known for producing a variety minerals, especially zeolites, including analcime, calcite, chabazite, heulandite, mesolite, montmorillonite, opal, paulingite-K, phillipsite, and thomsonite. The paulingite is especially notable for its rarity. At this locality it is found in red basalt alongside montmorillonite and phillipsite-K.

== Sinker Creek ==
The Sinker Creek Zeolite Occurrence is in southern Idaho. It is known for producing calcite, chabazite, nontronite, phillipsite, and thomsonite. The minerals occur in Late Pleistocene age basalt in a road cut by milepost 35 on Route 78.

== Lucky Peak Dam ==
The Lucky Peak Dam Zeolite Occurrence is located by the reservoir of Lucky Peak Dam in Idaho. It is known for producing a variety minerals, especially zeolites, including calcite, chabazite, erionite, levyne, offretite, phillipsite, and thomsonite. The levyne is especially notable here due to its greater abundance here as opposed to similar zeolite occurrences.

== Gardena ==
The Gardena Zeolite Occurrence is in central Idaho. It is known for producing a variety minerals, especially zeolites, including calcite, chabazite, mesolite, stilbite, and thomsonite.
