= Edingtonite =

Zeolite mineral

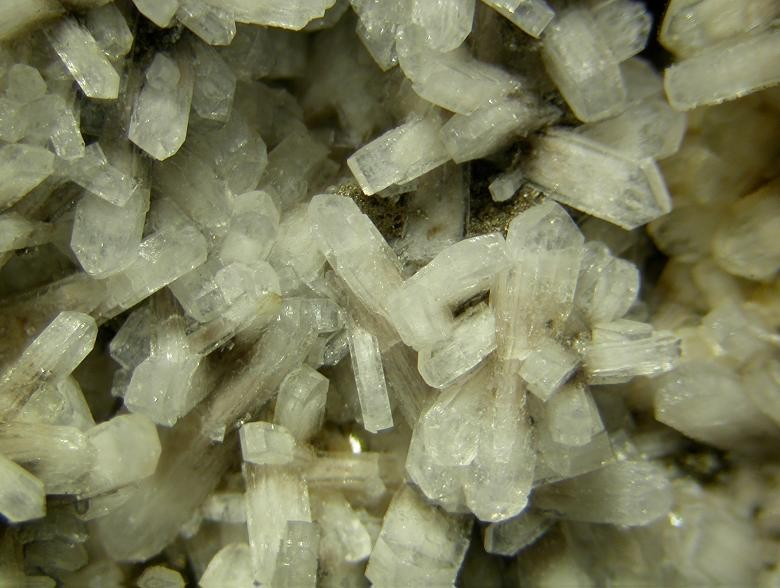
- Edingtonite from Ice River Alkaline Complex, Golden Mining Division, British Columbia, Canada

General
- Category: Tectosilicate minerals
- Group: Zeolite group
- Formula: BaAl_{2}Si_{3}O_{10}·4H_{2}O
- IMA symbol: Edi
- Strunz classification: 9.GA.15
- Crystal system: Orthorhombic

Identification
- Color: White, gray, pink
- Crystal habit: Prismatic pseudotetragonal crystals; massive.
- Twinning: On [110] and [001]
- Cleavage: Perfect on [110]
- Mohs scale hardness: 4 - 4.5
- Specific gravity: 2.73 - 2.78
- Optical properties: Biaxial (-)
- Refractive index: n_{α} = 1.538 n_{β} = 1.549 n_{γ} = 1.554
- Birefringence: δ = 0.016
- 2V angle: 54 - 62°
- Dispersion: r < v; strong
- Other characteristics: Pyroelectric and piezoelectric

Edingtonite is a white, gray, brown, colorless, pink or yellow zeolite mineral. Its chemical formula is BaAl_{2}Si_{3}O_{10}·4H_{2}O. It has varieties with tetragonal, orthorhombic or triclinic crystals.

The mineral occurs within cavities in nepheline syenites, carbonatites, in hydrothermal veins and various mafic rocks. It occurs associated with thomsonite, analcime, natrolite, harmotome, brewsterite, prehnite and calcite.

The mineral was first reported by and named for Scottish mineral collector James Edington (1787–1844). Other sources (including the mineralogist Haidinger) credit Scottish geologist and mineralogist Thomas Edington (1814-1859). However, as the mineral was named in 1825, the former accreditation must be the true one.
