= Clinoptilolite =

Natural zeolite mineral

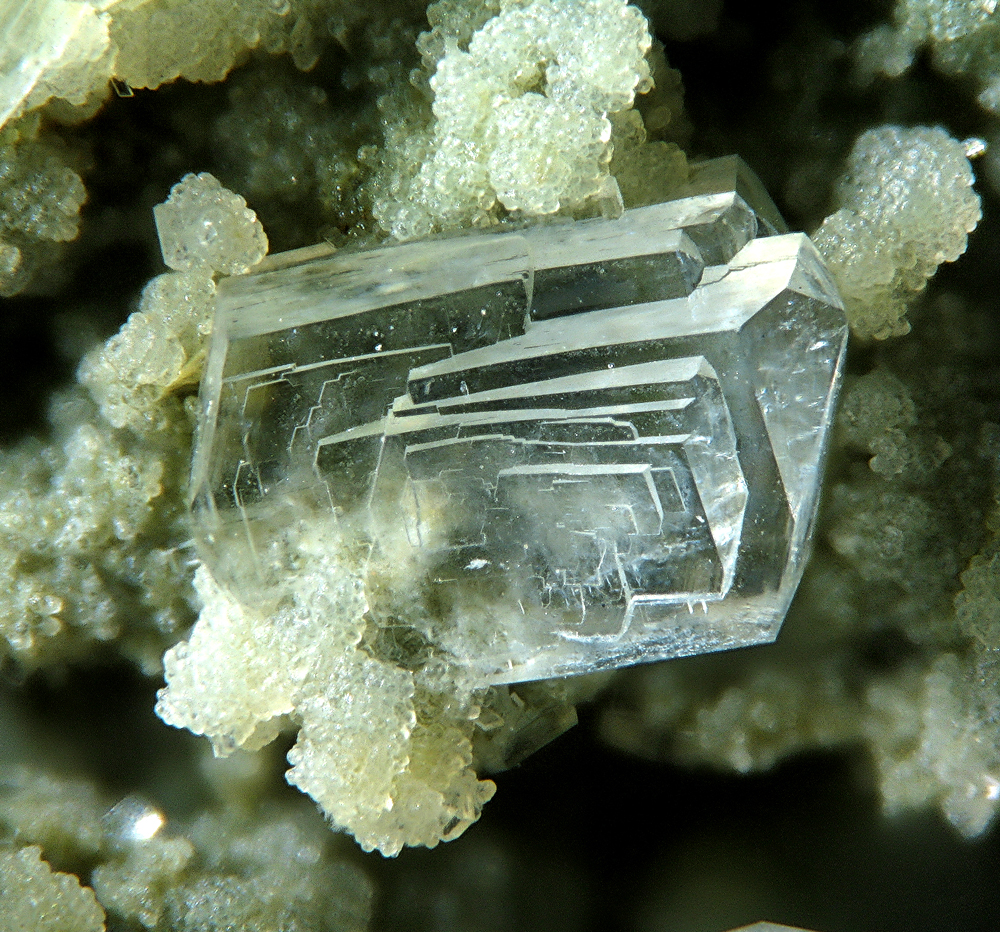
- Clinoptilolite-Na

General
- Category: Tectosilicate minerals
- Group: Zeolite group
- Formula: (Na,K,Ca)_{2–3}Al_{3}(Al,Si)_{2}Si_{13}O_{36}•12H_{2}O
- IMA symbol: Cpt
- Strunz classification: 9.GE.

Identification
- Mohs scale hardness: 3.5–4
- Luster: Vitreous

Clinoptilolite is a natural zeolite composed of a microporous arrangement of silica and alumina tetrahedra. It has the complex formula (Na,K,Ca)_{2–3}Al_{3}(Al,Si)_{2}Si_{13}O_{36}•12H_{2}O. It forms as white, green to reddish tabular monoclinic tectosilicate crystals with a Mohs hardness of 3.5 to 4 and a specific gravity of 2.1 to 2.2. It commonly occurs as a devitrification product of volcanic glass shards in tuff and as vesicle fillings in basalts, andesites and rhyolites. It was described in 1969 from an occurrence in the Barstow Formation, San Bernardino County, California. Sodium levels in clinoptilolite are generally higher than potassium levels, as is the case with the San Bernardino Barstow Formation, but there are sources that are potassium-rich and have minimal sodium.

It forms a series with heulandite:

- Clinoptilolite-Ca – heulandite-Ca solid solution series
- Clinoptilolite-K – heulandite-K solid solution series
- Clinoptilolite-Na – heulandite-Na solid solution series

Use of clinoptilolite in industry and academia focuses on its ion exchange properties having a strong exchange affinity for ammonium (NH_{4}^{+}). A typical example of this is in its use as an enzyme-based urea sensor.

The name is derived from the Greek words klino (κλίνω; "to slope"), ptilon (πτίλον; "down feather"), and lithos (λίθος; "stone"), denoting its crystal structure.

== Use ==
Clinoptilolite has many applications due to its effect as a molecular sieve, among others as an additive for building materials, as aggregate in horticulture, as an additive to cattle feed, as an additive in household products, as a desiccant, and in environmental technology.

Clinoptilolite was used on a large scale in the nuclear disaster of Chernobyl. There, the mineral was used on the one hand as an ion exchanger in cleaning plants to treat radioactively contaminated wastewater. On the other hand, it was added to cattle feed in order to bind and eliminate radioactive cations such as ^{137}cesium as an ion exchanger in the digestive tract.

Clinoptilolite is marketed within the EU as a medical device and is associated with scientifically unproven healing effects. It is not approved as a food supplement for human use due to the Novel Food Regulation. In Germany, it was therefore registered in December 2011 by the Federal Office of Consumer Protection and Food Safety under the rapid alert number "2011/1849" as an unauthorized novel food ingredient in food supplements..

Clinoptilolite has been approved as a medical device for oral usage within the EU by the European Commission and within the UK they must be approved by the UK Medical Health Regulatory Authority (MHRA) and placed on the Public Access Registration Database (PARD)

Clinoptilolite of sedimentary origin may be used as a "technological" additive in animal feed. It then serves as a binder. The European Commission authorised clinoptilolite for use in animal nutrition across all animal species in 2013. Only clinoptilolite of sedimentary origin is allowed.

== See also ==
- Paulingite
