= Aerinite =

Inosilicate mineral

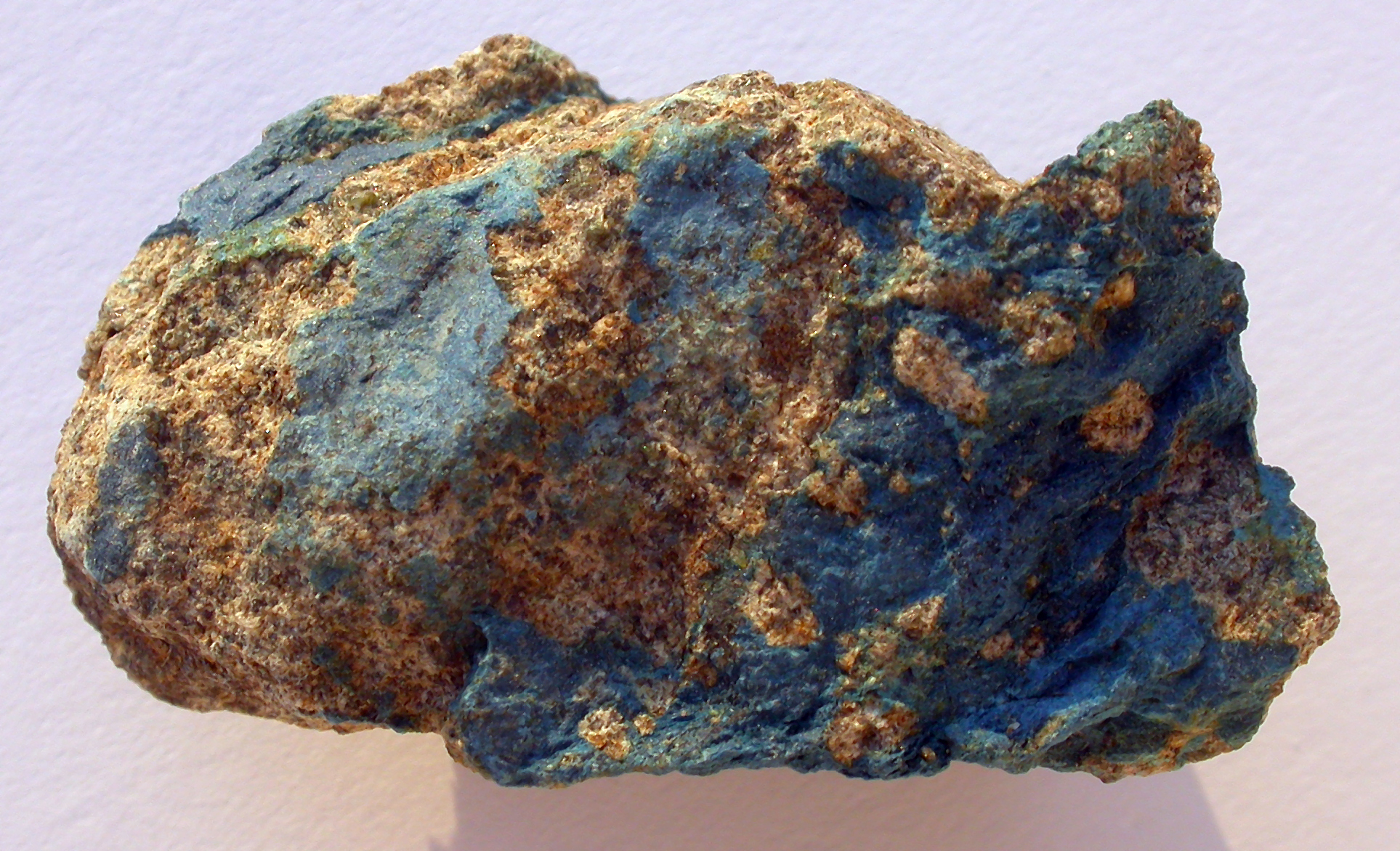
- Aerinite from Spain

General
- Category: Inosilicates
- Formula: Ca_{4}(Al,Fe,Mg)_{10}Si_{12}O_{35}(OH)_{12}CO_{3}·12H_{2}O
- IMA symbol: Aer
- Strunz classification: 9.DB.45
- Crystal system: Trigonal
- Space group: P3c1
- Unit cell: a = 14.690(15), b = 16.872(15) c = 5.170(15) [Å]; β = 94.75°; Z = 1

Identification
- Color: Blue to blue-green
- Crystal habit: fibrous
- Mohs scale hardness: 3
- Luster: vitreous
- Streak: bluish white
- Diaphaneity: translucent
- Specific gravity: 2.48
- Optical properties: Biaxial (−)
- Refractive index: n_{α}1.510(5), n_{β} = 1.560(5), n_{γ} = 1.580
- Pleochroism: Intense; X = bright blue; Y = Z = pale beige
- 2V angle: 63° (calc.)
- Dispersion: δ = 0.07

Aerinite (Ca_{4}(Al,Fe,Mg)_{10}Si_{12}O_{35}(OH)_{12}CO_{3}·12H_{2}O) is a bluish-purple inosilicate mineral. It crystallizes in the monoclinic system and occurs as fibrous or compact masses and coatings. It has a dark, vitreous luster, a specific gravity of 2.48 and a Mohs hardness of 3.

It is a low-temperature hydrothermal phase occurring in zeolite facies alteration of dolerites. Associated minerals include prehnite, scolecite and mesolite.

Its name comes from a Greek root "aerinos," meaning "atmosphere" or "sky blue". It was first described by Lasaulx (1876) from a specimen in the Wrocław museum that was obtained in Aragon, Spain. In 1882, the geologist Luis Mariano Vidal found the mineral in situ in Caserras del Castillo, a locality that currently belongs to the municipality of Estopiñán del Castillo, in Huesca (Spain).

== Deposits and uses ==
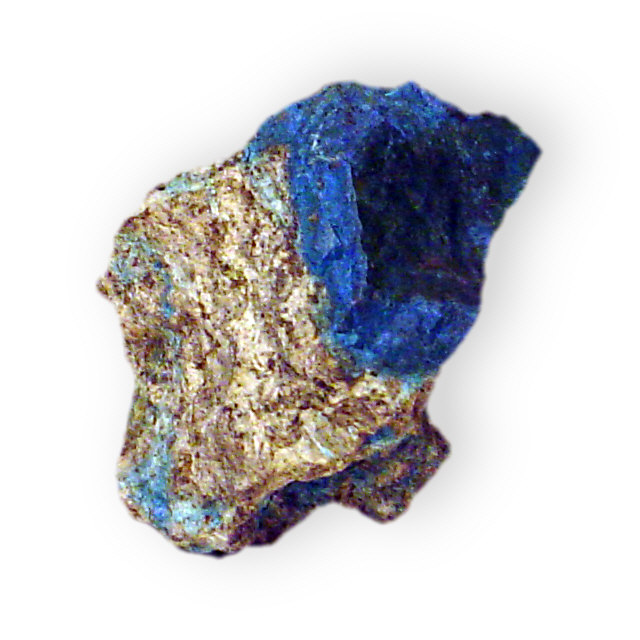
Aerinite from Spain

Aerinite is a rare mineral. It has been found in several deposits in the Spanish Pyrenees of Huesca and Lleida, as in Estopiñán del Castillo, Camporrélls, Juseu and Tartareu. In France, the site is important from St. Pendelon, in the Landes. Aerinite was used as a blue pigment in Romanesque paintings in many churches in the Spain, and also in some French, including the most famous of them, the Pantocrator in the church of San Clemente de Tahull.

== See also ==
- List of minerals
