= Paulingite =

Zeolite mineral

General
- Category: Tectosilicate minerals
- Group: Zeolite group
- Formula: (K,Na,Ca)_{3–4}(Si,Al)_{21}O_{42}•17-22H_{2}O
- IMA symbol: Pau
- Strunz classification: 9.GC.35
- Crystal system: Cubic
- Crystal class: Hexoctahedral (m3̅m); H-M symbol: (4/m 3̅ 2/m)
- Space group: Im3̅m

Identification
- Color: Colorless, light yellow, orange, red
- Crystal habit: Typically as euhedral crystals
- Cleavage: None
- Fracture: Conchoidal
- Mohs scale hardness: 5
- Luster: Vitreous to adamantine
- Diaphaneity: Transparent
- Specific gravity: 2.085 – 2.24
- Refractive index: n = 1.472–1.484
- Ultraviolet fluorescence: None

Paulingite or paulingite-K is a rare zeolite mineral that is found in vesicles in the basaltic rocks from the Columbia River near Rock Island Dam, Washington.

Paulingite was named for Linus Carl Pauling (1901–1994), professor of chemistry, California Institute of Technology and accepted by the International Mineralogical Association in 1960.

The early formation in the crystallization sequence and the high water content suggest that paulingite forms from relatively dilute pore fluids. They have a large unit cell of 3.51 nanometers and an isometric crystal system. This is the largest known inorganic unit cell apart from protein structures. Paulingite's characteristic structure can be observed while the remaining water content decomposes. A single crystal X-ray refinement of this chemically different sample material derived three main cation positions, which are inside a so-called paulingite or calcium (Ca), between 8-rings of neighbouring barium (Ba), and in the centre of the non-planar 8-rings of the -cage potassium (K).

== Introduction ==
Kamb and Oke in 1960 first described paulingite from vesicles in the Tertiary, augite-bearing, basaltic rocks at the Rock Island dam in Washington, where it is associated with clinoptilolite (Na,K,Ca)_{2–3}Al_{3}(Al,Si)_{2}Si_{13}O_{36}·12H_{2}O), phillipsite (Ca,Na_{2},K_{2})_{3}Al_{6}Si_{10}O_{32}·_{12}H_{2}O, calcite (CaCO_{3}), and pyrite (FeS_{2}). Zeolite minerals are crystalline, hydrated aluminosilicate of alkali and alkaline cations with a three-dimensional structure. It is a special group of minerals that is important due to its members' uses in different industries. Due to its special properties like attractive adsorption, cation-exchange, dehydration-rehydration and catalysis properties they are used in the nuclear industry, construction industry, agricultural industry, medical industry, petrochemical industry, space industry and domestic products industry (Fredrick A. Mumpton, 1998). It is a rare zeolite mineral with a dodecahedron crystal form {110} and has a very large unit cell with a = 3.51 nanometers. The mineral information was described by Kamb and Oke (1960) which has Si/Al ratio of 3.0, a BaO range of 0.5–4.1% and 18.5% of water content (Tscherinch and Wise, 1982).

== Physical, crystallographic information and structure ==
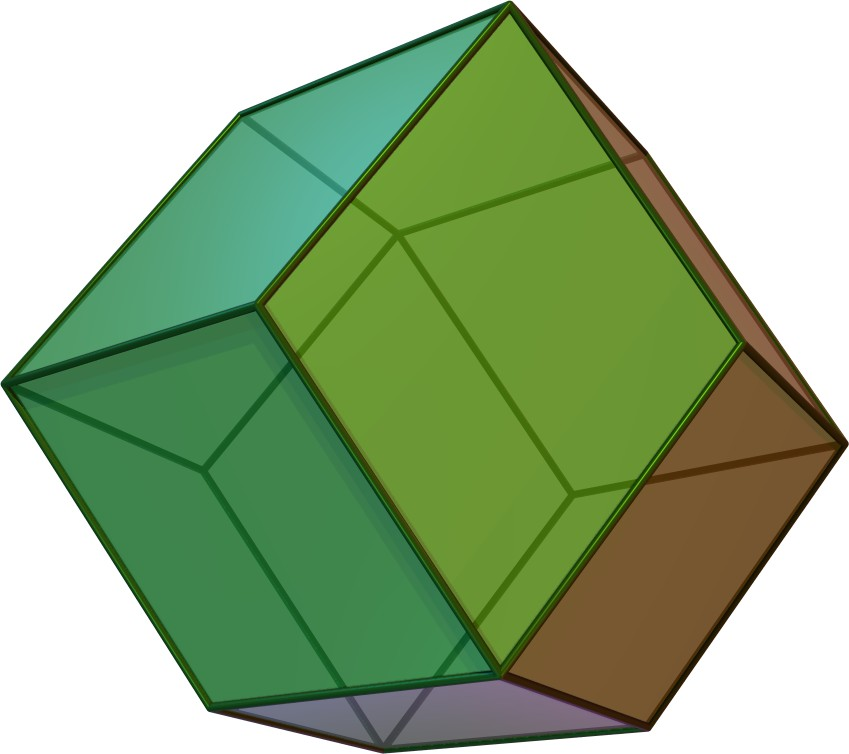
A rhombic dodecahedron has twelve faces, each of which is a rhombus.

Paulingite is a perfect clear rhombic dodecahedron of 0.1 to 1.0 mm in diameter. Their attachment to vesicles causes a hemispherical shape exhibiting 5 to 6 planes of dodecahedral planes. In the vesicular walls, they appear to be dark brown to black. They are actually clear and colorless due to clarity and their attachment to the vesicular wall. The crystal faces are smooth and planar and have a bright vitreous luster. The crystals have no cleavage. Under a binocular microscope, it resembles chips of ice. Lamellae seen optically may indicate twinning. They have a conchoidal fracture. It has a white streak. Rhombic dodecahedron is the dominant crystal form for paulingite. The hardness of paulingite is 5. The size of the paulingite unit cell is outstanding because it is the largest inorganic compounds exceeding most complex, intermetallic compounds. The measured density is 2.085 g/cm^{3} and calculated density is 2.10 g/cm^{3}. The figure below shows the dodecahedron shape of paulingite mineral.

Viewing under a petrographic microscope, the crystals contains a scattering of minute bubble-like inclusions. Paulingite is mostly isotropic and in extreme cases that faint, isolated, fuzzy and weak birefringent twinning which is a determining factor for differentiating paulingite from analcite (NaAlSi_{2}O_{6}·H_{2}O). The refractive index at 230 in sodium vapor light by immersion method is 1.473. Single crystal diffraction study provides information that paulingite is cubic and the cubic length of a_{0} = 35.10 Å. It was determined from rotation photograph using copper Ka radiation, nickel filtered, with the film in self-calibrating arrangement. The reflections were indexed with the help of a zero-layer Weissenberg photograph. Reflections of the type hkl for l = 0 to l = 12 have been examined with equi-inclination weissenberg photographs, and only reflections having h+k+l even are observed, indicating a body-centered lattice. The crystal system is isometric. The space group of the paulingite is Im3m and the point group is 4/m3 2/m (Kamb and Oke 1960).

== Geologic occurrence ==
Paulingite is usually found in vesicles of basalt flows. Because of its rarity, certain chemical factors have to be considered for its formation. The exchangeable cations do not control the formation of paulingite because variations of localities have different percentages to elements; e.g. Riggins zeolites are K rich while Chase Creek is Barium rich. The Si/Al ratio does not control the formation because the ratio is controlled by the pH of the solution. They may have formed around hydrated or partially hydrated alkali and alkaline earth cations which act as a template. Relatively low-saline solutions promote paulingite framework. So it occurs in sub-alkaline rocks. There are following localities where paulingite are also found which include Riggins in Idaho country, Ritter in Grant county and Chase creek in British Columbia. In Europe, Paulingite was found among zeolites of the Giants Causeway in Ireland and two zeolite localities near Howeneeg and Vogelsberg (Tscherinch and Wise, 1982).

== Distribution ==
In the US, at Rock Island Dam, on the Columbia River, Wenatchee, Douglas Co., Washington; from near Riggins, Idaho Co., Idaho; and at Three Mile Creek, near Ritter, Grant Co., Oregon. On Chase Creek, at the junction with Charcoal Creek, north of Falkland, British Columbia, Canada. Large crystals from the Giant's Causeway and Craigahulliar, Portrush, Co. Antrim, Northern Ireland. At Kladno and Vinarice, Czech Republic. In the Höwenegg quarry, Hegau, Baden-Württemberg, and in the Ortenberg quarry, Vogelsberg, Hesse, Germany.

== Association ==
Zeolite mineral species, pyrite and calcite are the important minerals are usually found in association with paulingite.
