= Scolecite =

Zeolite mineral

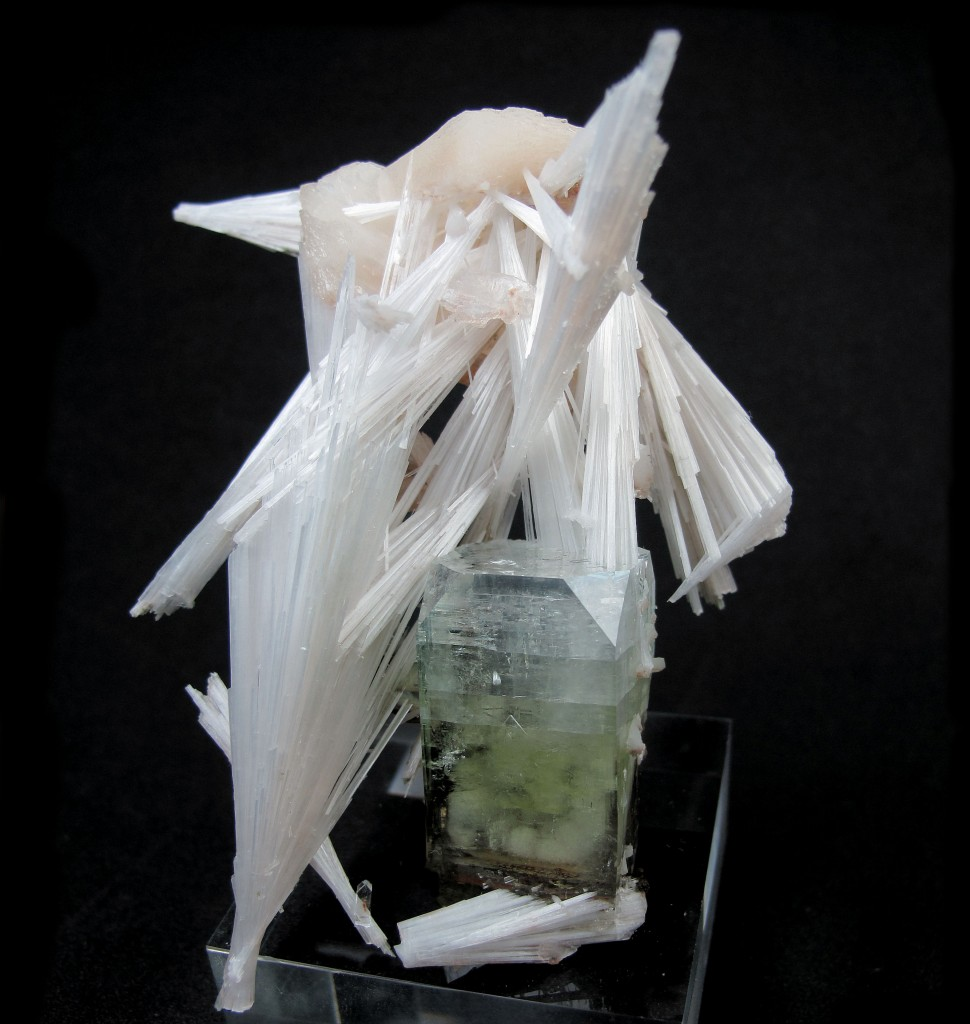

General
- Category: Tectosilicate minerals
- Group: Zeolite group, natrolite subgroup
- Formula: CaAl_{2}Si_{3}O_{10}·3H_{2}O
- IMA symbol: Slc
- Strunz classification: 9.GA.05 (10 ed); 8/J.21-60 (8 ed)
- Dana classification: 77.1.5.5
- Crystal system: Monoclinic
- Crystal class: Domatic (m) (same H-M symbol)
- Space group: Cc

Identification
- Formula mass: 392.34 g/mol
- Color: Colorless white, pink, salmon, red or green
- Crystal habit: Thin prismatic needles, radiating groups and fibrous masses
- Twinning: Common on {100}, twin axis [001], rare on {001} and {110}
- Cleavage: Perfect on {110} and {11̅0}
- Fracture: Irregular/uneven
- Tenacity: Brittle
- Mohs scale hardness: 5 to 5 1/2
- Luster: Vitreous, silky when fibrous
- Streak: White
- Diaphaneity: Transparent to translucent
- Specific gravity: 2.16 to 2.40
- Optical properties: Biaxial (−)
- Refractive index: N_{x} = 1.507 to 1.513; N_{y} = 1.516 to 1.520; N_{z} = 1.517 to 1.521
- Pleochroism: X: colourless Y: colourless Z: colourless
- Solubility: Soluble in common acids.
- Other characteristics: Pyroelectric and piezoelectric, sometimes fluorescent yellow to brown in LW and SW UV. Not radioactive.

Scolecite is a tectosilicate mineral belonging to the zeolite group; it is a hydrated calcium silicate, CaAl_{2}Si_{3}O_{10}·3H_{2}O. Only minor amounts of sodium and traces of potassium substitute for calcium. There is an absence of barium, strontium, iron and magnesium. Scolecite is isostructural (having the same structure) with the sodium-calcium zeolite mesolite and the sodium zeolite natrolite, but it does not form a continuous chemical series with either of them. It was described in 1813, and named from the Greek word, σκώληξ (sko-lecks) = "worm" because of its reaction to the blowpipe flame.

== Crystal class ==
It is monoclinic m with space group Cc, but crystals are pseudotetragonal. Scolecite, like natrolite and mesolite, usually occurs as acicular (needle-like) and fibrous aggregations. It has nearly the same angles between the crystal faces as does natrolite, but natrolite is orthorhombic and scolecite is monoclinic. The etched figures (figures that arise from the action of a solvent on a crystal face, and indicate its true symmetry) and the pyroelectric character of scolecite show that it crystallizes with a plane of symmetry, but no axis of symmetry, that is to say it belongs to the hemihedral class of the monoclinic system. Scolecite can therefore be distinguished from natrolite by an optical examination, since the acicular crystals do not extinguish parallel to their length between crossed nicol prisms. Twinning on the ortho-pinacoid is usually evident.

== Structure ==
The structure of the aluminosilicate framework is the same for scolecite, natrolite and mesolite. Scolecite has long ordered chains, rotated 24° round the axis of the chain. One Ca cation and three H_{2}O molecules are in four ion sites in the channels parallel to the c crystal axis. There is no sign of aluminium ions occupying silicon ion sites.

== Unit cell ==
Scolecite is a monoclinic mineral, with the angle β equal to about 109° and four formula units per unit cell (Z = 4). Described in this way, various sources give the following values for the parameters of the unit cell, which has one long side and two short ones:

- a = 6.516 to 6.517 Å, b = 18.948 to 18.956 Å, c = 9.761 to 9.765 Å, β = 108.86 to 108.98°
- a = 6.52 to 6.53 Å, b = 18.96 to 18.97 Å, c = 9.76 to 9.78 Å, β = 108.9°
- a = 6.516 Å, b = 18.948 Å, c = 9.761 Å, β = 108.98°

Crystals, however, are pseudotetragonal, and this can be represented by taking a different unit cell, with twice as many formula units (Z = 8) and two long sides and one short one. The axes are redefined, a and b are very nearly equal and the angle β between the new a and c axes is very nearly equal to 90° (a truly tetragonal crystal would have a = b and β = 90° exactly). The sources give the following values:

- a=18.488 to 18.508 Å, b=18.891 to 18.96 Å, c=6.527 to 6.548 Å, β = 90.64 to 90.75°
- a = 18.508(5) Å, b = 18.981(5) Å, c = 6.527(2) Å β = 90.64°
- a = 18.508(5) Å, b = 18.981(5) Å, c = 6.527(2) Å, β = 90:64(1)°
- a = 18.51 Å, b = 18.97 Å, c = 6.53 Å, β = 90.6°

== Crystal habit ==
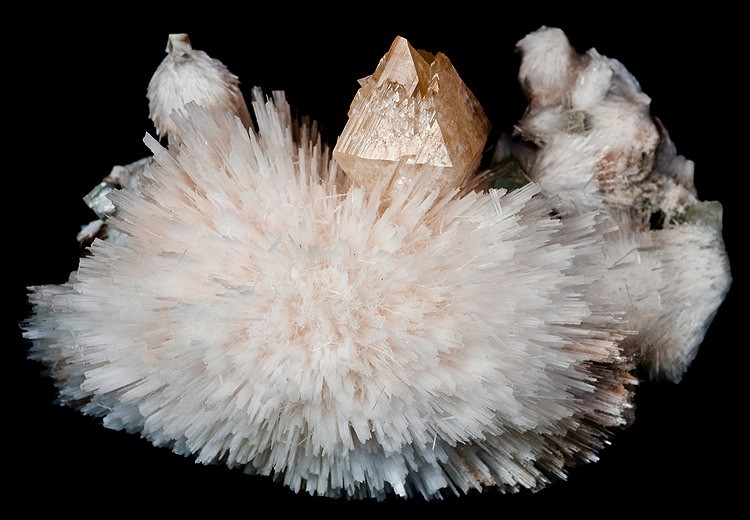
Cluster of scolecite needles

Scolecite commonly occurs as sprays of thin, prismatic needles, frequently flattened on one side, with slanted terminations and striated parallel to the length of the needles. The crystals appear to be pseudo-orthorhombic or pseudo-tetragonal, and may be square in cross section. It also occurs as radiating groups and fibrous masses. Epitaxial intergrowths (intergrowths of two different crystalline substances in a non-random way) with mesolite, Na_{2}Ca_{2}Al_{6}Si_{9}O_{30}·8H_{2}O, are common. (Natrolite, Na_{2}Al_{2}Si_{3}O_{10}·2H_{2}O, does not directly form epitaxial overgrowths on scolecite). All three minerals may be developed in the same crystal.

Scolecite crystals appear to be monoclinic by X-ray analysis. Common forms include {111}, {1̅11}, {101}, {110} and {010}.

== Physical properties ==
Scolecite is usually colorless or white, but can also be pink, salmon, red or green. It is transparent to translucent, with a white streak and a luster which is vitreous, or silky for fibrous specimens. It has a Mohs hardness of 5 to 5 1/2 and a specific gravity in the range 2.16 to 2.40. (2.24 to 2.31 2.25 to 2.29 2.16 to 2.4 2.25 to 2.31). Cleavage is perfect in two directions parallel to the length of the crystals; the mineral is brittle with an irregular fracture. Twinning is common on {100}, twin axis [001], as penetration or contact twins producing V-shaped or fishtail terminations. Scolecite is pyroelectric and piezoelectric, sometimes fluorescent yellow to brown in longwave and shortwave ultraviolet light. It is soluble in common acids. Not radioactive.

== Optical properties ==
Biaxial (-) with refractive indices: N_{x} = 1.507 to 1.513, N_{y} = 1.516 to 1.520, N_{z} = 1.517 to 1.521. Pleochroism has been reported, X: colorless Y: colorless Z: colorless.

== Environment ==
Scolecite is a common zeolite. It is a mineral of secondary origin, and occurs with other zeolites in the amygdaloidal cavities (cavities filled with secondary minerals) of weathered basalts, also in gneisses and amphibolites, and in laccoliths and dikes derived from syenitic and gabbroic magmas, and in contact metamorphic zones. It is a hydrothermal mineral derived from low temperature alteration of basalts and related rocks, associated with other zeolites, calcite, quartz and prehnite. It can be found on top of the calcium zeolites heulandite, stilbite and epistilbite. Associated minerals include quartz, apophyllite, babingtonite, heulandite, stilbite and other zeolites.

== Localities ==
Scolecite was first described from Kaiserstuhl in Baden-Württemberg in 1813. Divergent groups of prismatic crystals are found in the basalt of Berufjörður near Djúpivogur, Suður-Múlasýsla, Iceland and in the Deccan Traps near Pune in India; hence the synonym poonahlite for this species. Other occurrences include Riverside County, California; Skye, Scotland and Santa Catarina, Brazil.

There is no type locality. Most of the world's finest scolecite specimens are found in the Tertiary Deccan Basalt near Nasik, Pune, in the state of Maharashtra, India. The quarries in the Nasik region produce large, colorless sprays of well terminated coarse scolecite crystals that are commonly twinned on {100} to form V-shaped terminations with V-shaped striations on {010}. The scolecite is commonly found alone or on stilbite and is covered with laumontite or colorless, pale green or white fluorapophyllite. It is also found in the region as massive radiating material with powellite, and in cavities in basalt as colorless, flattened crystals in radiating sprays on blocky green apophyllite covered by tiny, thin, colorless apophyllite plates.

Scolecite has been reported from many other localities, including Antarctica, Australia, Austria, Brazil, Bulgaria, Canada, Chile, Czechoslovakia, Ethiopia, Faroe Islands, France, Germany, Greenland, Hungary, Iceland, Italy, Japan, Mexico, Mozambique, Nicaragua, Peru, Poland, South Africa, Sweden, Switzerland, Taiwan, United Kingdom, United States and Yugoslavia.
