= Lévyne =

Group of zeolite minerals

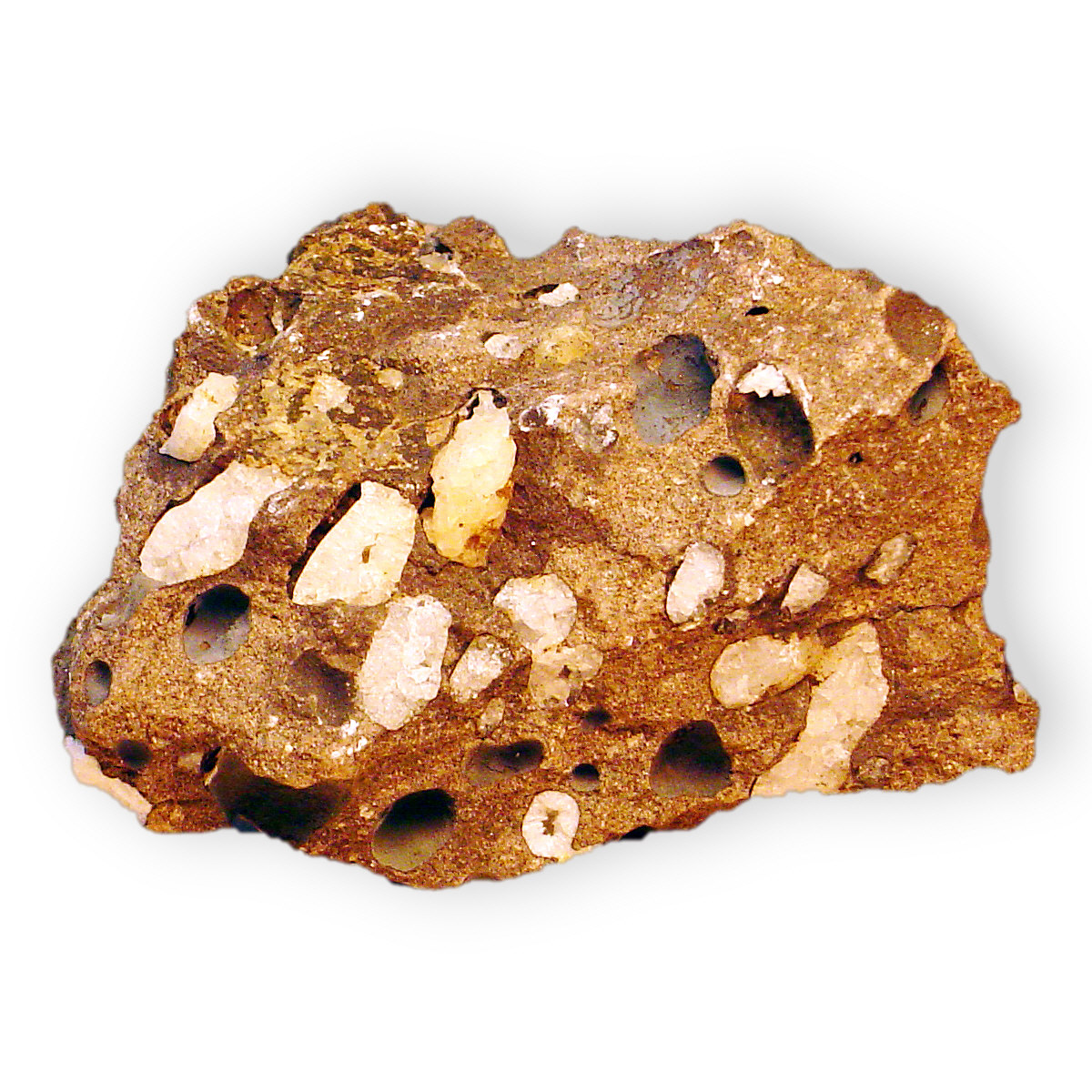
- Lévyne in basalt matrix

General
- Category: Tectosilicate minerals
- Group: Zeolite group, chabazite-lévyne subgroup
- Formula: Lévyne-Na: (Na_{2},Ca,K_{2})Al_{2}Si_{4}O_{12}·6H_{2}O; Lévyne-Ca: (Ca,Na_{2},K_{2})Al_{2}Si_{4}O_{12}·6H_{2}O
- IMA symbol: Lév
- Strunz classification: 9.GD.15
- Dana classification: 77.1.2.8
- Crystal system: Trigonal
- Crystal class: Hexagonal scalenohedral (3̅m); H-M symbol: (3̅ 2/m)
- Space group: R3̅m (no. 166)

Identification
- Color: White, reddish white, yellowish white, gray
- Crystal habit: Platy, tabular, radial, fibrous
- Twinning: Penetration, rotation on [0001]
- Cleavage: Perfect
- Fracture: Uneven, sub-conchoidal
- Tenacity: Brittle
- Mohs scale hardness: 4–4.5
- Luster: Vitreous
- Streak: White
- Diaphaneity: Transparent
- Specific gravity: 2.09–2.16
- Density: 2.17 g/cm3 (calculated)
- Optical properties: Uniaxial (-)

Lévyne or lévynite is a group of zeolite minerals, i.e. hydrated silicate minerals. There are two members of the group:

- Lévyne-Na, the sodium-dominant species (Na_{2},Ca,K_{2})Al_{2}Si_{4}O_{12}·6H_{2}O, and
- Lévyne-Ca the calcium-dominant species (Ca,Na_{2},K_{2})Al_{2}Si_{4}O_{12}·6H_{2}O

Lévyne crystallizes in the trigonal crystal system and belongs to the hexagonal scalenohedral crystal class. It typically occurs as radiating clusters or fibrous masses that are transparent to translucent in colors ranging from white through reddish and yellowish white to gray. It has a specific gravity of 2.09 - 2.16 and a Mohs hardness of 4.0 to 4.5. It has a vitreous luster and perfect cleavage on [1011]. Typical occurrence is as an alteration and vesicle filling mineral in basalts.

It was named for French mineralogist Armand Lévy (1795–1841). The calcium variety was first described in 1821 for an occurrence in Dalsnipa, Sandoy, Faroe Islands. The sodium variety was described in 1997 for an occurrence in Chojabaru, Nagasaki Prefecture, Japan.
