= Estopiñán del Castillo =

Coordinates: 41.995°N 0.542°E

Estopiñán del Castillo (Spanish) Estopanyà (Ribagorçan) Estupinyán (Aragonese)
- Coat of arms
- Interactive map of Estopiñán del Castillo (Spanish)
- Country: Spain
- Autonomous community: Aragon
- Province: Huesca
- Municipality: Estopiñán del Castillo/Estopanyà

Area
  - Total: 88.7 km^{2} (34.2 sq mi)

Population (2025-01-01)
  - Total: 147
  - Density: 1.66/km^{2} (4.29/sq mi)
- Time zone: UTC+1 (CET)
  - Summer (DST): UTC+2 (CEST)

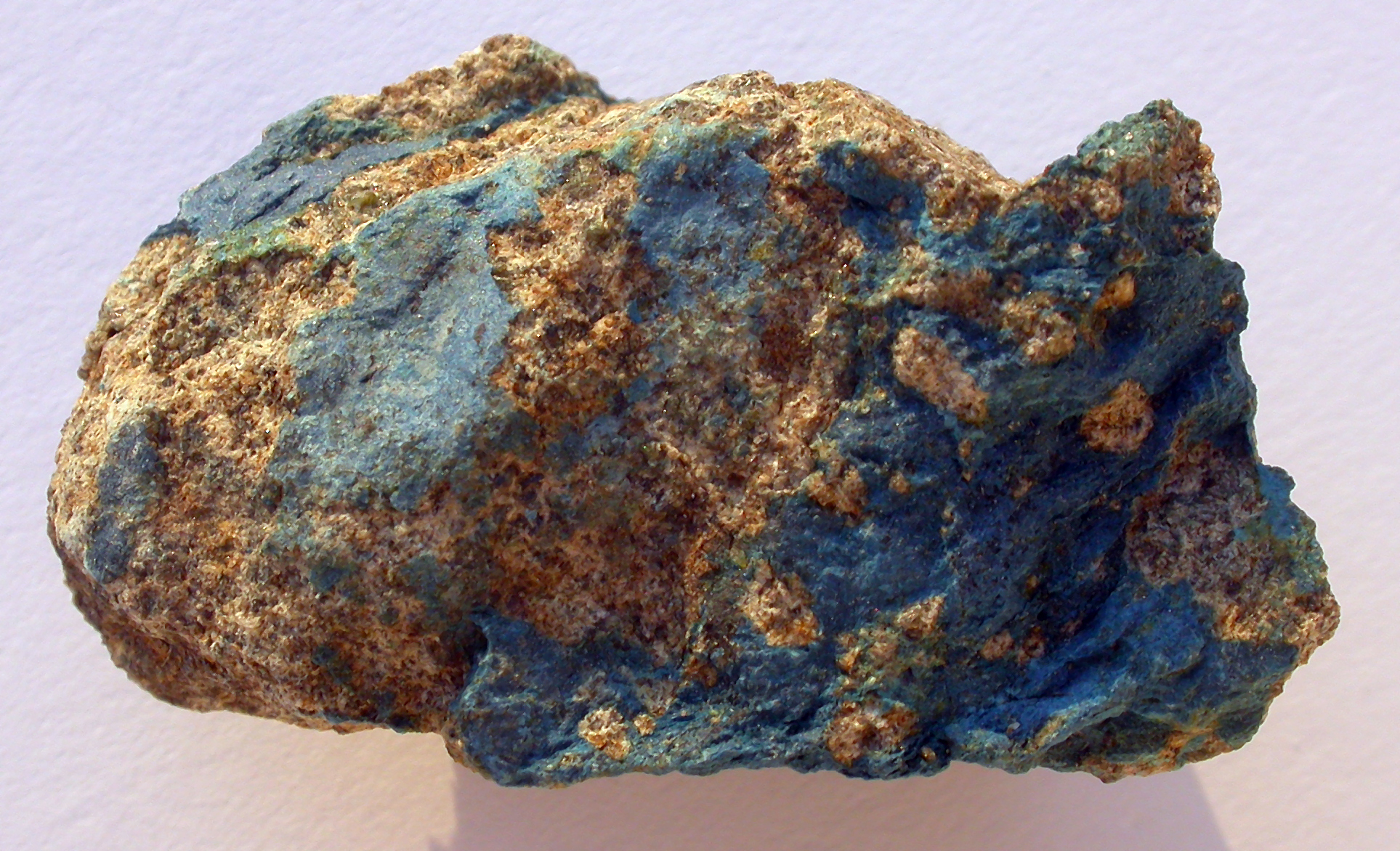
Aerinite from Estopiñán del Castillo

Estopiñán del Castillo (Spanish: [estopiˈɲan del kasˈtiʎo]), in Ribagorçan: Estopanyà (Catalan: [astopaˈɲa]; in Aragonese: Estupinyán) is a municipality located in the province of Huesca, Aragon, Spain. According to the 2004 census (INE), the municipality had a population of 217 inhabitants.

In this municipality, the inhabitants speaks a variety transition of Catalan and Aragonese languages, called Ribagorçan.

== See also ==
- List of municipalities in Huesca
