= Harmotome =

Rare zeolite mineral

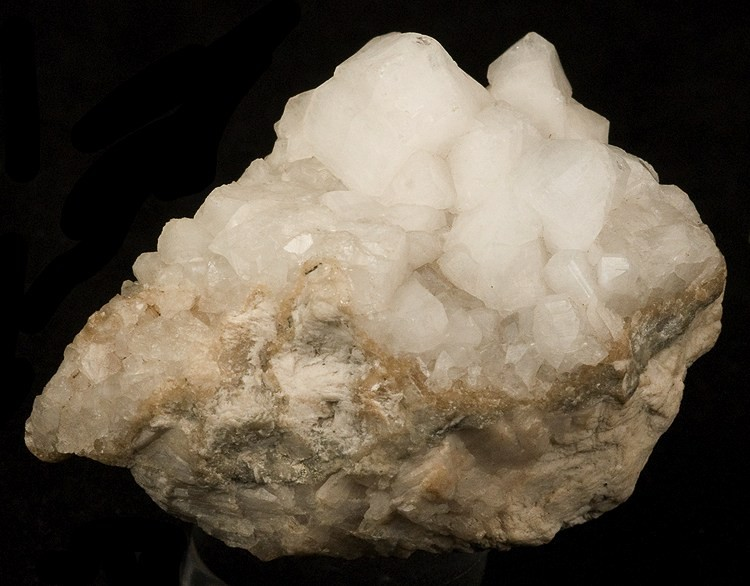

General
- Category: Tectosilicate minerals
- Group: Zeolite group, phillipsite subgroup
- Formula: (Ba_{2}(Si_{12}Al_{4})O_{32}·12H_{2}O
- IMA symbol: Hrm
- Crystal system: Monoclinic
- Crystal class: Prismatic (2/m) (same H-M symbol)
- Space group: P2_{1}/m

Identification
- Specific gravity: 2.44 to 2.5

Harmotome is a mineral, one of the rarer zeolites; a hydrated barium silicate with formula: (Ba_{2}(Si_{12}Al_{4})O_{32}·12H_{2}O. It forms vitreous white well defined monoclinic crystals, often associated with calcite and other zeolites. It has a Mohs hardness of 4 to 5 and a specific gravity of 2.44 to 2.5.

== Name and discovery ==
Named from the Greek words Ancient Greek: ἁρμός, romanized: harmos (a joint) and Ancient Greek: τέμνειν, romanized: témnein (to cut) by René Just Haüy in 1801 because the pyramid divides parallel to the plane that passes through the terminal edges. It was first described in 1801 from an occurrence in the Harz Mountains, Lower Saxony, Germany.

== Location ==
Like other zeolites, harmotome occurs with calcite in the amygdaloidal cavities of volcanic rocks, for example, in the dolerites of Dunbartonshire, and as fine crystals in the agate-lined cavities in the melaphyre of Oberstein in Germany. It also occurs in gneiss, and sometimes in metalliferous veins. At Sankt Andreasberg in the Harz it is found in the lead and silver veins; and at Strontian in Argyll in lead veins, associated with brewsterite (a strontium and barium zeolite), barytes and calcite.
