= Cowlesite =

Zeolite mineral

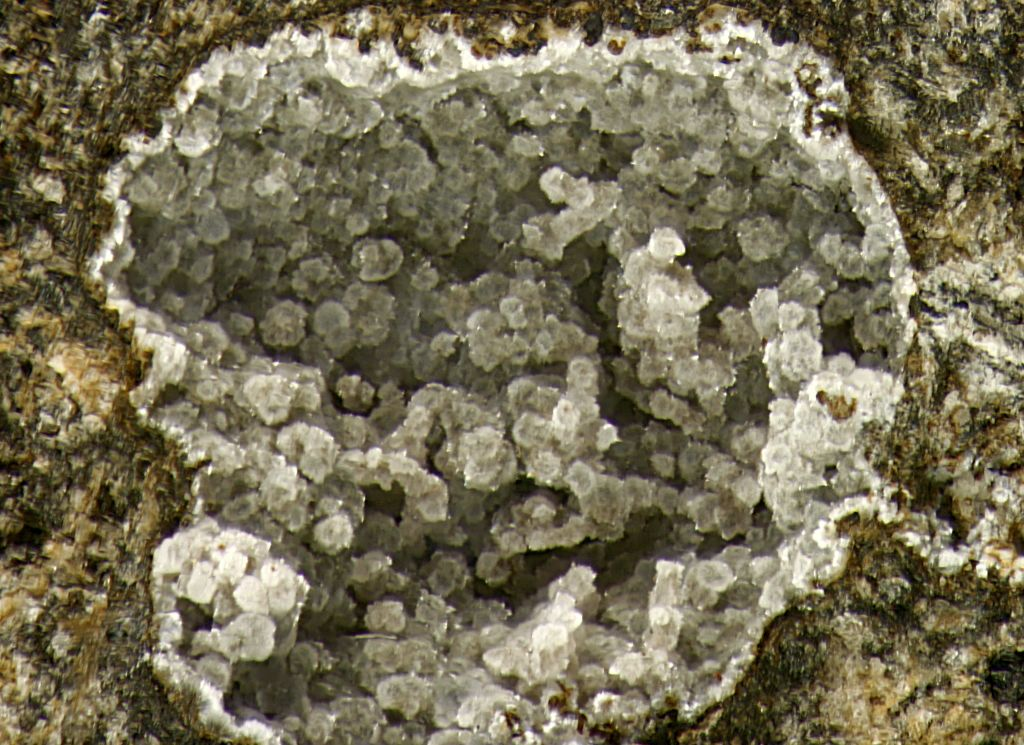
- Cowlesite

General
- Category: Tectosilicate minerals
- Group: Zeolite group
- Formula: Ca(Al_{2}Si_{3})O_{10}·5-6H_{2}O
- IMA symbol: Cow
- Strunz classification: 8/J.24-10
- Crystal system: Orthorhombic

Identification
- Colour: Colourless, White
- Mohs scale hardness: 5-5.5
- Luster: Vitreous

Cowlesite is a mineral named after American mineralogist John Cowles. W.S. Wise and Rudy W. Tschernich first described it in material from roadcuts along Neer Road, Goble, Oregon, United States. The description also incorporated data from Superior, Arizona. It most often occurs as small colorless to white spheres in basalt, and is often associated with other zeolites.
