= Brewsterite =

Series of tectosilicate minerals

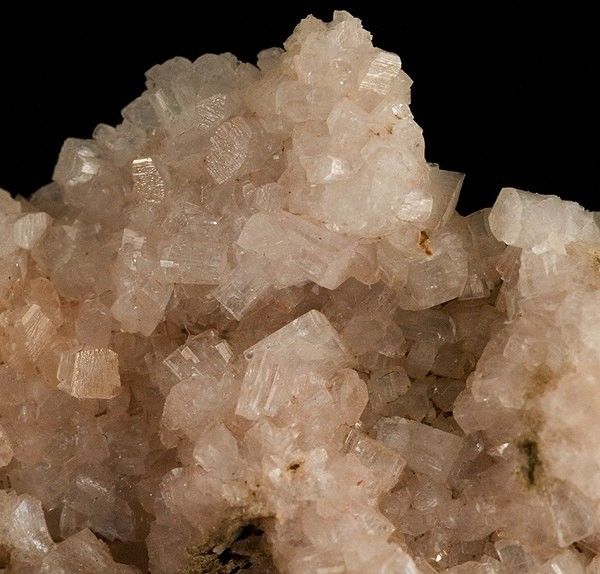
- Brewsterite-Sr from Yellow Lake, Olalla, British Columbia, Canada

General
- Category: Tectosilicate minerals
- Group: Zeolite group
- IMA symbol: Brw
- Strunz classification: 9.GE.20
- Crystal system: Monoclinic; Possibly triclinic
- Crystal class: Possibly prismatic (2/m)
- Space group: Possibly P2_{1}/m

Identification
- Luster: Vitreous

Brewsterite is the name of a series of tectosilicate minerals of the zeolite group. Prior to 1997, brewsterite was recognized as a mineral species, but a reclassification in 1997 by the International Mineralogical Association changed it to a series name, with the mineral species being named brewsterite-Sr and brewsterite-Ba. Brewsterite-Sr, the more common of these, is a hydrous strontium and aluminium silicate, (Sr,Ba)_{2}Al_{4}Si_{12}O_{32}·10H_{2}O. Small amounts of barium is usually present replacing part of the strontium. The appropriate species name depends on the dominant element. The species are visually indistinguishable, and the series name brewsterite is still used whenever testing has not been performed.

It is generally considered to be monoclinic, though optical studies have suggested it might be triclinic. It has one plane of perfect cleavage. The color is white, yellow-white, or gray. The Mohs' hardness is 5. It is transparent to translucent. The crystals are prismatic. Brewsterite is isomorphous with heulandite.

It is named after Sir David Brewster (1781–1868) who described it in 1822. The type locality for the series and for brewsterite-Sr is Strontian, Argyll, Scotland.

It is a hydrothermal mineral occurring in volcanic rocks such as basalt. Grayish crystals are found at the Giant's Causeway in County Antrim. It is found with harmotome in the lead mines at Strontian in Argyllshire.
