= Zeolite =

Microporous, aluminosilicate mineral group

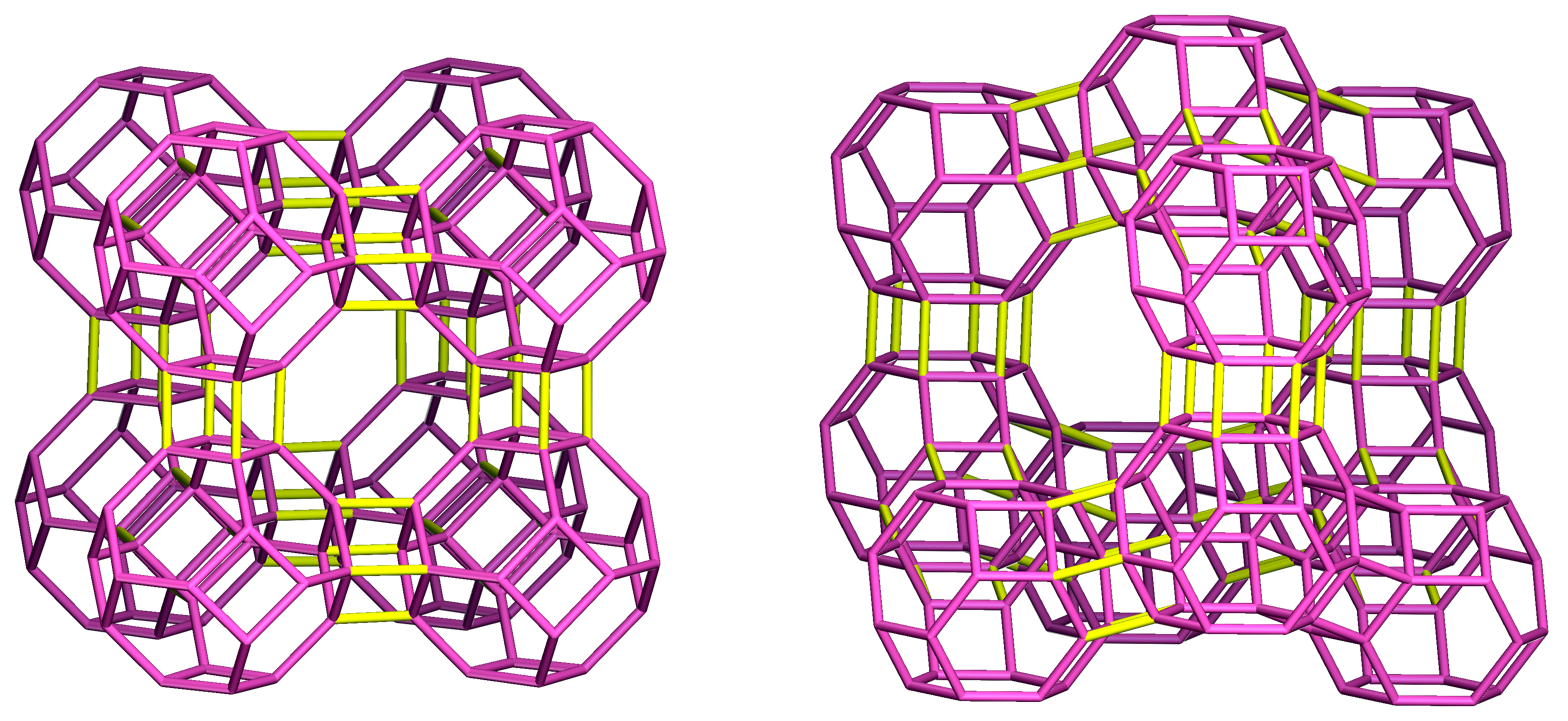
Frameworks of LTA-type (left) and FAU-type zeolites (right)

Zeolites are a group of several microporous, crystalline aluminosilicate minerals commonly used as commercial adsorbents and catalysts. They mainly consist of silicon, aluminium, and oxygen, and have the general formula M^{n+}_{1/n}(AlO_{2})^{−}(SiO_{2})_{x}･yH_{2}O where M^{n+}_{1/n} is either a metal ion or H^{+}.

The term was originally coined in 1756 by Swedish mineralogist Axel Fredrik Cronstedt, who observed that rapidly heating a material, believed to have been stilbite, produced large amounts of steam from water that had been adsorbed by the material. Based on this, he called the material zeolith (changed later to zeolite in English, to fit the naming scheme for minerals in -ite) from the Greek ζέω (zéō), meaning "to boil" and λίθος (líthos), meaning "stone".

== Production ==
The first synthetic structure was reported by Richard Barrer in 1948. Industrially important zeolites are produced synthetically. Over 200 synthetic zeolites have been reported.

Synthetic zeolites hold some key advantages over their natural analogs. The synthetic materials are manufactured in a uniform, phase-pure state. It is also possible to produce zeolite structures that do not appear in nature. Zeolite A is a well-known example. The principal raw materials used to manufacture zeolites are silica and alumina, which are among the most abundant mineral components on earth.

Zeolites occur naturally, but are also produced industrially on a large scale. As of December 2018, 253 unique zeolite frameworks have been identified, and over 40 naturally occurring zeolite frameworks are known. Every new zeolite structure that is obtained is examined by the International Zeolite Association Structure Commission (IZA-SC) and receives a three-letter designation.

== Characteristics ==
=== Properties ===
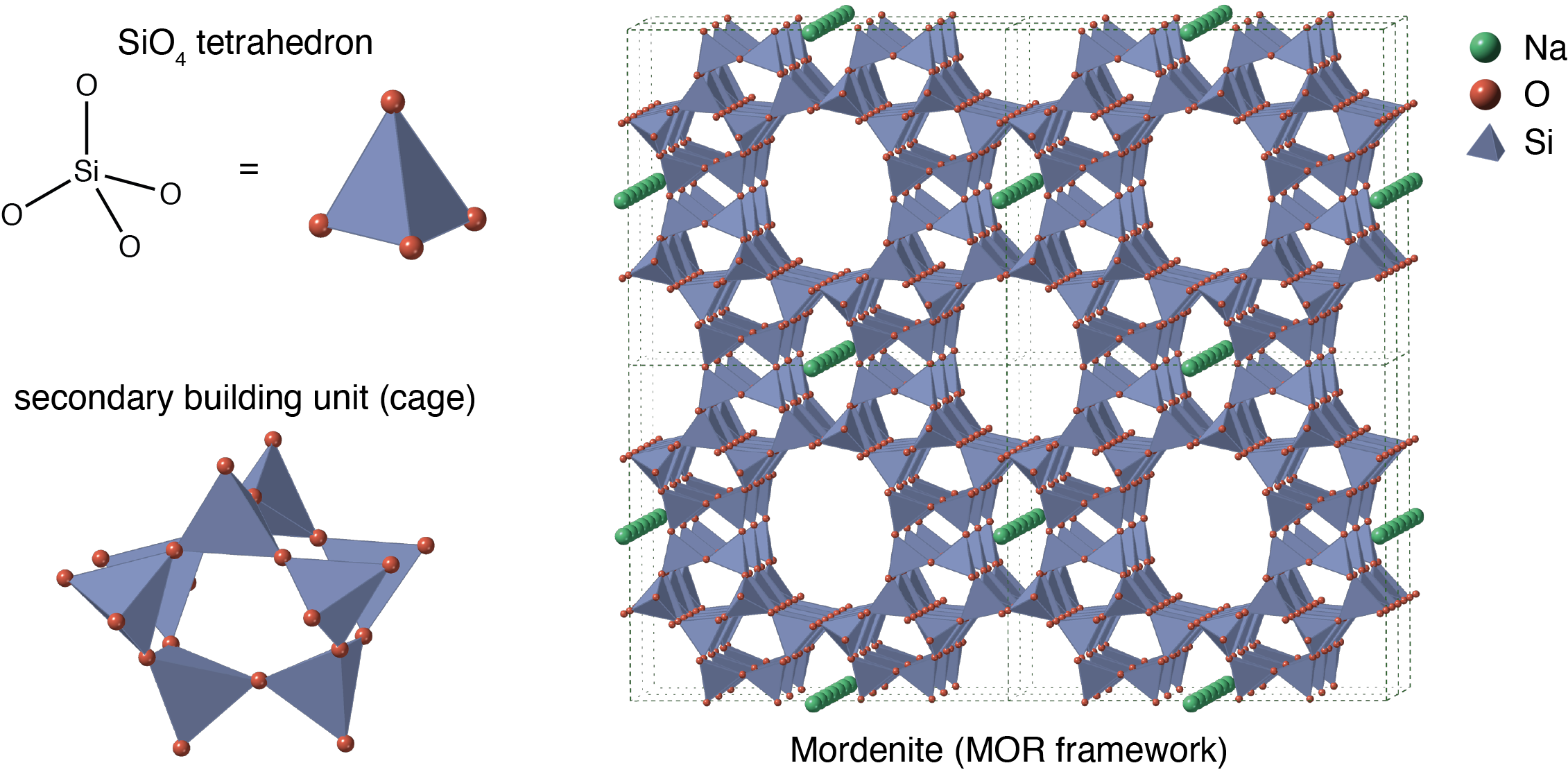
Microscopic structure of a zeolite (mordenite) framework, assembled from corner-sharing SiO_{4} tetrahedra. Sodium is present as an extra-framework cation (in green). Si atoms can be partially replaced by Al or other tetravalent metals.

Zeolites are white solids with ordinary handling properties, like many routine aluminosilicate minerals, e.g. feldspar. They have the general formula (MAlO_{2})(SiO_{2})_{x}(H_{2}O)_{y} where M^{+} is usually H^{+} and Na^{+}. The Si/Al ratio is variable, which provides a means to tune the properties. Zeolites with a Si/Al ratios higher than about 3 are classified as high-silica zeolites, which tend to be more hydrophobic. The H^{+} and Na^{+} can be replaced by diverse cations, because zeolites have ion exchange properties. The nature of the cations influences the porosity of zeolites.

Zeolites have microporous structures with a typical diameter of 0.3–0.8 nm. Like most aluminosilicates, the framework is formed by linking of aluminium and silicon atoms by oxides. This linking leads to a 3-dimensional network of Si-O-Al, Si-O-Si, and Al-O-Al linkages. The aluminium centers are negatively charged, which requires an accompanying cation. These cations are hydrated during the formation of the materials. The hydrated cations interrupt the otherwise dense network of Si-O-Al, Si-O-Si, and Al-O-Al linkage, leading to regular water-filled cavities. Because of the porosity of the zeolite, the water can exit the material through channels. Because of the rigidity of the zeolite framework, the loss of water does not result in collapse of the cavities and channels.

Their ability to generate voids within a rigid solid underpins the use of zeolites as catalysts and molecular sieves. They possess high physical and chemical stability due to the covalent bonding within their framework. Some are hydrophobic and thus are suited for adsorption of hydrophobic molecules such as hydrocarbons. In addition to that, high-silica zeolites are H^{+} exchangeable, unlike natural zeolites, and are used as solid acid catalysts. The high silica zeolites especially are sufficiently acidic to protonate hydrocarbons. These are used for fluid catalytic cracking in petrochemical industry. Cracking catalysts become poisoned by carbonaceous residues. These residues can be combusted without major damage to the host zeolite, a further testament to their robustness. For some applications, such regenerated zeolites are called equilibrium catalysts.

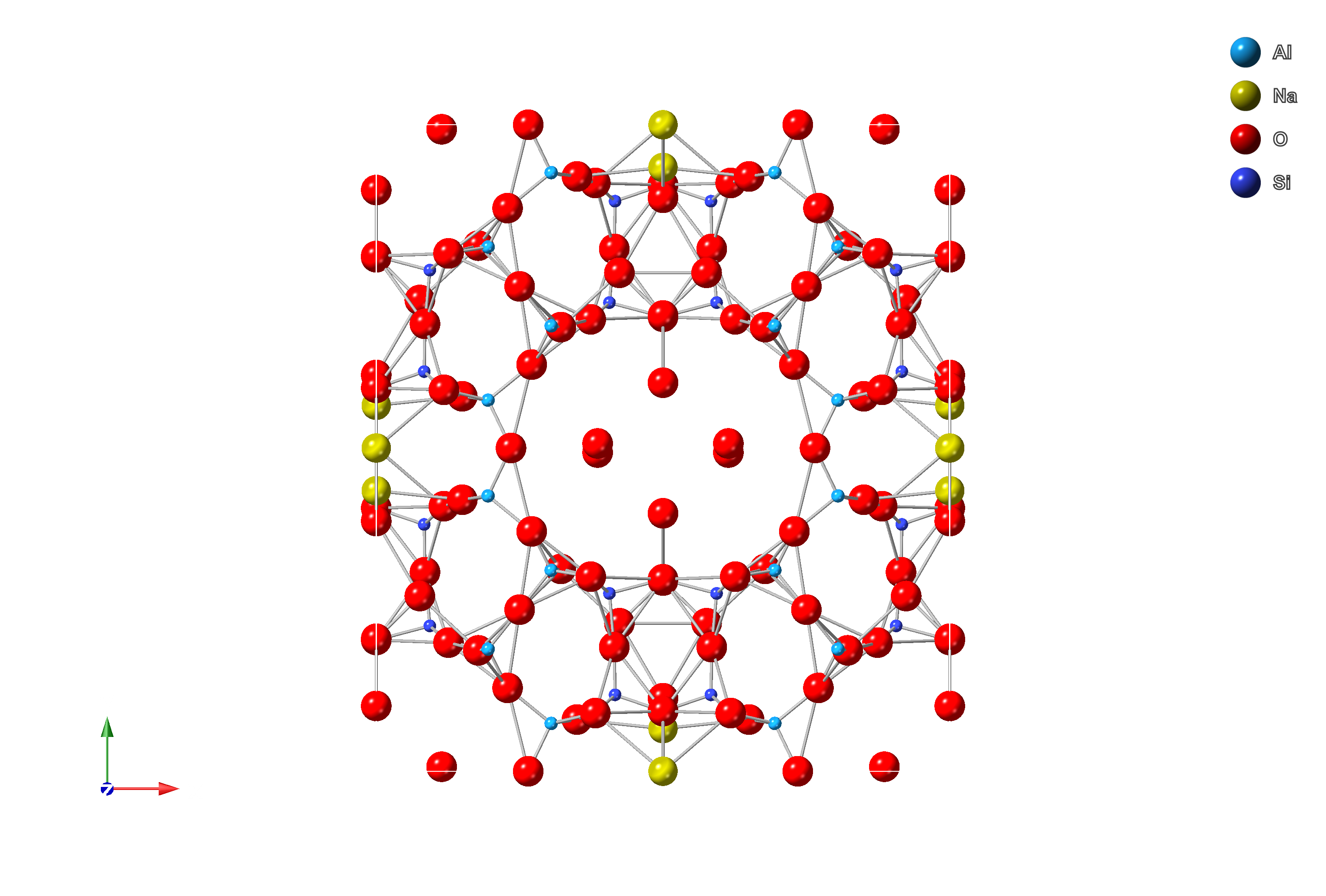
Zeolite Mordenite with some Si atoms substituted with Al atoms

=== Framework structure ===
Three ways to represent the oxygen 4-membered ring structure of silicate compounds

The structures of hundreds of zeolites have been determined. Most do not occur naturally. For each structure, the International Zeolite Association (IZA) gives a three-letter code called framework type code (FTC). For example, the major molecular sieves, 3A, 4A and 5A, are all LTA (Linde Type A). Most commercially available natural zeolites are of the MOR, HEU or ANA-types.

An example of the notation of the ring structure of zeolite and other silicate materials is shown in the upper right figure. The middle figure shows a common notation using structural formula. The left figure emphasizes the SiO_{4} tetrahedral structure. Connecting oxygen atoms together creates a four-membered ring of oxygen (blue bold line). In fact, such a ring substructure is called four membered ring or simply four-ring. The figure on the right shows a 4-ring with Si atoms connected to each other, which is the most common way to express the topology of the framework.

The figure on the right compares the typical framework structures of LTA (left) and FAU (right). Both zeolites share the truncated octahedral structure (sodalite cage) (purple line). However, the way they are connected (yellow line) is different: in LTA, the four-membered rings of the cage are connected to each other to form a skeleton, while in FAU, the six-membered rings are connected to each other. As a result, the pore entrance of LTA is an 8-ring (0.41 nm) and belongs to the small pore zeolite, while the pore entrance of FAU is a 12-ring (0.74 nm) and belongs to the large pore zeolite, respectively. Materials with a 10-ring are called medium pore zeolites, a typical example being ZSM-5 (MFI).

Although more than 200 types of zeolites are known, only about 100 types of aluminosilicate are available. In addition, there are only a few types that can be synthesized in industrially feasible way and have sufficient thermal stability to meet the requirements for industrial use. In particular, the FAU (faujasite, USY), ^{*}BEA (beta), MOR (high-silica mordenite), MFI (ZSM-5), and FER (high-silica ferrierite) types are called the big five of high silica zeolites, and industrial production methods have been established.

=== Isomorphous replacement ===
The scope of zeolites is greatly expanded because Si and Al in zeolites can be at least partially replaced with other atoms without major changes in the overall framework, i.e., isomorphous replacement. Germanium, iron, gallium, boron, zinc, tin, and titanium have been investigated. Other heteroatoms have been claimed, including titanium, and zinc Al atoms in zeolites can be also structurally replaced with boron and gallium.

The silicoaluminophosphate type (AlPO molecular sieve), in which Si is isomorphous with Al and P and Al is isomorphous with Si, and the gallogermanate and others are known.

=== Porosity ===
The term molecular sieve refers to a particular property of these materials, i.e., the ability to selectively sort molecules based primarily on a size exclusion process. This is due to a very regular pore structure of molecular dimensions. The maximum size of the molecular or ionic species that can enter the pores of a zeolite is controlled by the dimensions of the channels. These are conventionally defined by the ring size of the aperture, where, for example, the term "eight-ring" refers to a closed-loop that is built from eight tetrahedrally coordinated silicon (or aluminium) atoms and eight oxygen atoms. These rings are not always perfectly symmetrical due to a variety of causes, including strain induced by the bonding between units that are needed to produce the overall structure or coordination of some of the oxygen atoms of the rings to cations within the structure. Therefore, the pores in many zeolites are not cylindrical.

== Natural occurrence ==
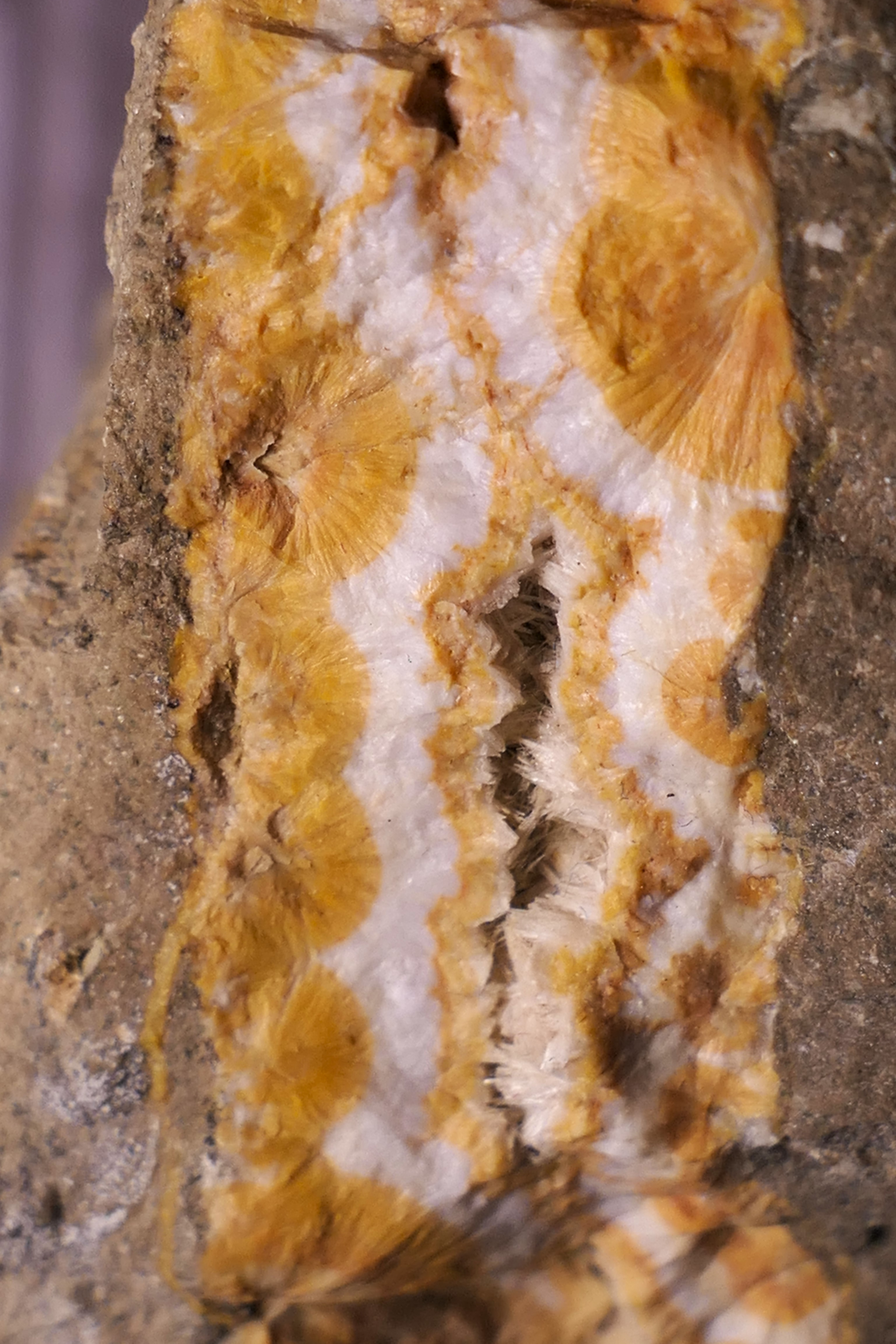
Natrolite needles from Hohentwiel (Typelocality)

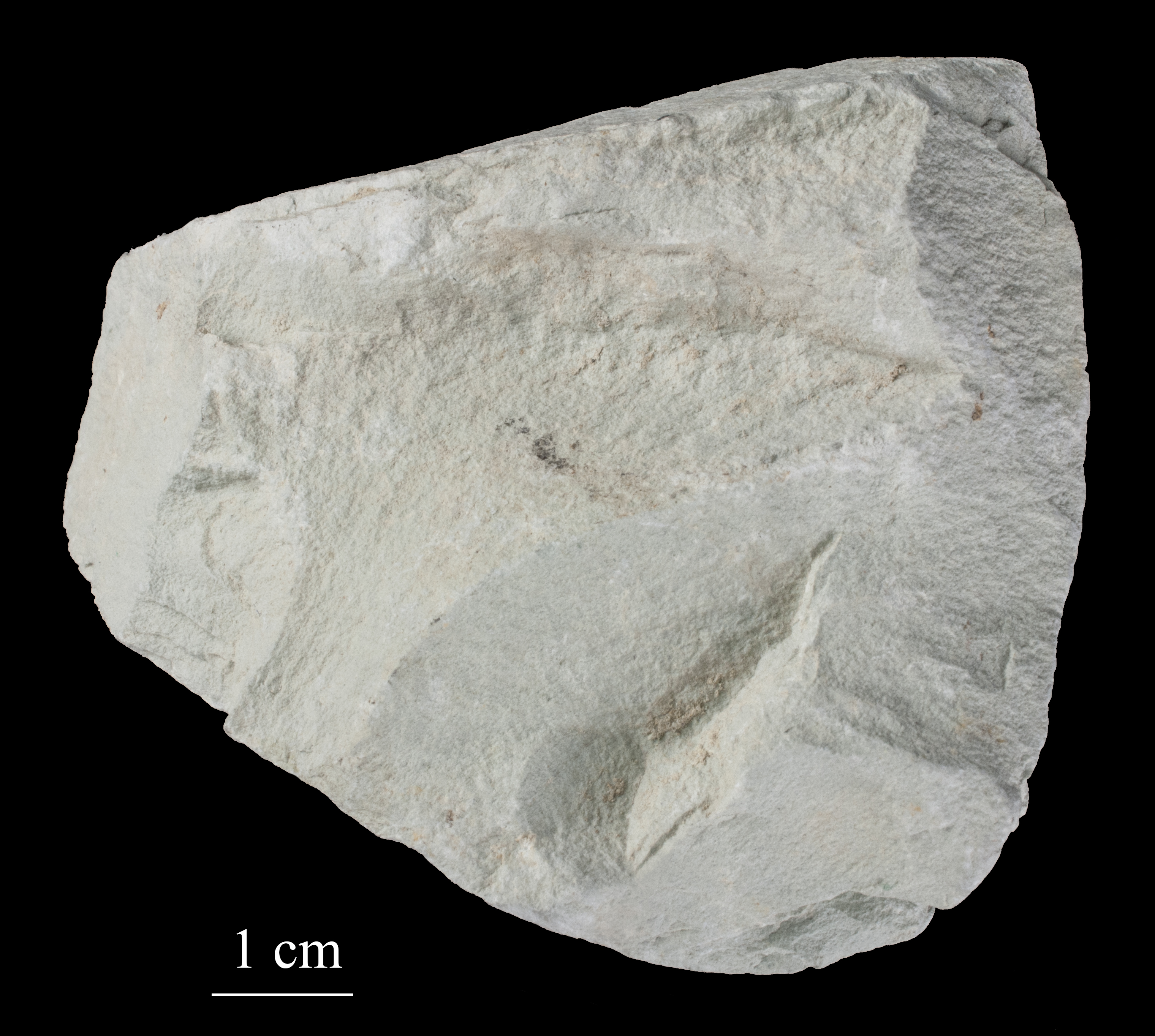
Zeolite exhibited in the Estonian Museum of Natural History

Some of the more common mineral zeolites are analcime, chabazite, clinoptilolite, heulandite, natrolite, phillipsite, and stilbite. An example of the mineral formula of a zeolite is: Na_{2}Al_{2}Si_{3}O_{10}·2H_{2}O, the formula for natrolite.

Zeolites transform to other minerals under weathering, hydrothermal alteration or metamorphic conditions. Some examples:

- The sequence of silica-rich volcanic rocks commonly progresses from:
  - Clay → quartz → mordenite–heulandite → epistilbite → stilbite → thomsonite → mesolite → scolecite → chabazite → calcite.
- The sequence of silica-poor volcanic rocks commonly progresses from:
  - Cowlesite → levyne → offretite → analcime → thomsonite → mesolite → scolecite → chabazite → calcite.

=== Ore mining ===
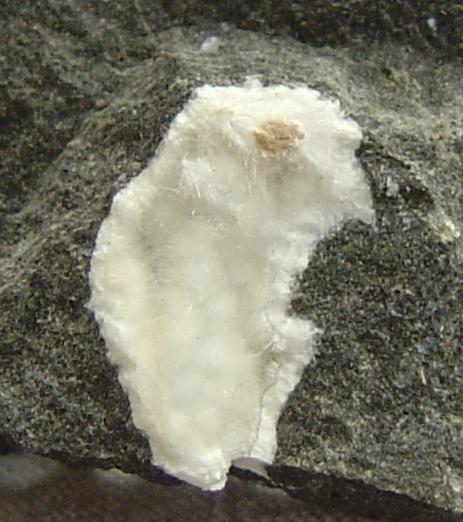
Natrolite from Poland

As of 2016, the world's annual production of natural zeolite approximates 3 million tonnes. Major producers in 2010 included China (2 million tonnes), South Korea (210,000 t), Japan (150,000 t), Jordan (140,000 t), Turkey (100,000 t) Slovakia (85,000 t) and the United States (59,000 t). The ready availability of zeolite-rich rock at low cost and the shortage of competing minerals and rocks are probably the most important factors for its large-scale use. According to the United States Geological Survey, it is likely that a significant percentage of the material sold as zeolites in some countries is ground or sawn volcanic tuff that contains only a small amount of zeolites. These materials are used for construction, e.g. dimension stone (as an altered volcanic tuff), lightweight aggregate, pozzolanic cement, and soil conditioners.

=== Synthesis ===
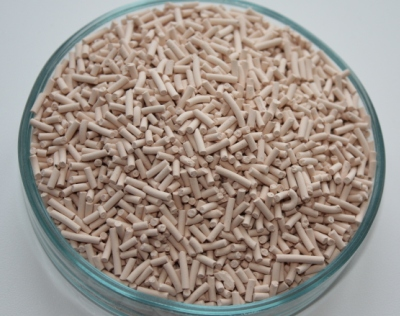
Synthetic zeolite

Typical procedures entail heating aqueous solutions of alumina and silica with sodium hydroxide. Equivalent reagents include sodium aluminate and sodium silicate. Further variations include the use of structure directing agents (SDA) such as quaternary ammonium cations. Zeolite synthesis involves sol-gel-like processes. The product properties depend on reaction mixture composition, pH of the system, operating temperature, pre-reaction 'seeding' time, reaction time as well as the templates used. In the sol-gel process, other elements (metals, metal oxides) can be incorporated.

== Applications ==
Zeolites are widely used as catalysts and sorbents. In chemistry, zeolites are used as membranes to separate molecules (only molecules of certain sizes and shapes can pass through), and as traps for molecules so they can be analyzed.

Research into and development of the many biochemical and biomedical applications of zeolites, particularly the naturally occurring species heulandite, clinoptilolite, and chabazite has been ongoing.

=== Ion-exchange, water purification and softening ===
Zeolites are widely used as ion-exchange beds in domestic and commercial water purification, softening, and other applications.

Evidence for the oldest known zeolite water purification filtration system occurs in the undisturbed sediments of the Corriental reservoir at the Maya city of Tikal, in northern Guatemala.

Earlier, polyphosphates were used to soften hard water. The polyphosphates form a complex with metal ions like Ca^{2+} and Mg^{2+} to bind them so that they can not interfere in cleaning process. However, when this phosphate rich water goes in main stream water, it results in eutrophication of water bodies and hence use of polyphosphate was replaced with use of a synthetic zeolite.

The largest single use for zeolite is the global laundry detergent market. Zeolites are used in laundry detergent as water softeners, removing Ca^{2+} and Mg^{2+} ions which would otherwise precipitate from the solution. The ions are retained by the zeolites which release Na^{+} ions into the solution, allowing the laundry detergent to be effective in areas with hard water.

=== Catalysis ===
Synthetic zeolites, like other mesoporous materials (e.g., MCM-41), are widely used as catalysts in the petrochemical industry, such as in fluid catalytic cracking and hydrocracking. Zeolites confine molecules into small spaces, which causes changes in their structure and reactivity. The acidic forms of zeolites are often powerful solid-state solid acids, facilitating a host of acid-catalyzed reactions, such as isomerization, alkylation, and cracking.

Catalytic cracking uses a reactor and a regenerator. Feed is injected onto a hot, fluidized catalyst where large gasoil molecules are broken into smaller gasoline molecules and olefins. The vapor-phase products are separated from the catalyst and distilled into various products. The catalyst is circulated to a regenerator, where the air is used to burn coke off the surface of the catalyst that was formed as a byproduct in the cracking process. The hot, regenerated catalyst is then circulated back to the reactor to complete its cycle.

=== Nuclear waste reprocessing ===
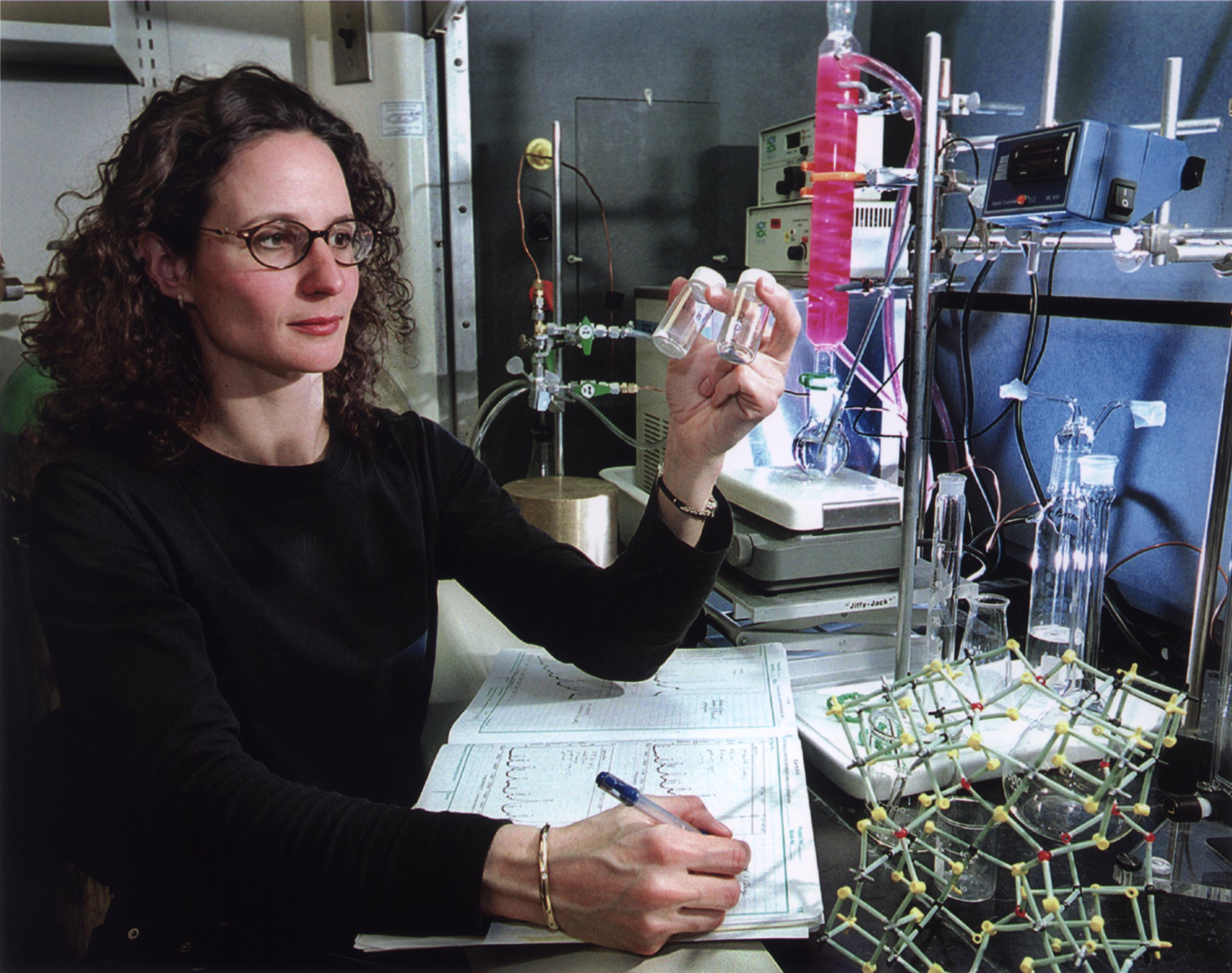
A researcher at Sandia National Laboratories examines vials of SOMS (Sandia Octahedral Molecular Sieve), a zeolite that shows potential for radioactive waste and industrial metals cleanup.

Zeolites have been used in advanced nuclear reprocessing methods, where their micro-porous ability to capture some ions while allowing others to pass freely allows many fission products to be efficiently removed from the waste and permanently trapped. Equally important are the mineral properties of zeolites. Their alumino-silicate construction is extremely durable and resistant to radiation, even in porous form. Additionally, once they are loaded with trapped fission products, the zeolite-waste combination can be hot-pressed into an extremely durable ceramic form, closing the pores and trapping the waste in a solid stone block. This is a waste form factor that greatly reduces its hazard, compared to conventional reprocessing systems. Zeolites are also used in the management of leaks of radioactive materials. For example, in the aftermath of the Fukushima Daiichi nuclear disaster, sandbags of zeolite were dropped into the seawater near the power plant to adsorb the radioactive cesium-137 that was present in high levels.

=== Gas separation and storage ===
Zeolites have the potential of providing precise and specific separation of gases, including the removal of H_{2}O, CO_{2}, and SO_{2} from low-grade natural gas streams. Other separations include noble gases, N_{2}, O_{2}, freon, and formaldehyde.

On-board oxygen generating systems (OBOGS) and oxygen concentrators use zeolites in conjunction with pressure swing adsorption to remove nitrogen from compressed air to supply oxygen for aircrews at high altitudes, as well as home and portable oxygen supplies.

Animation of pressure swing adsorption, (1) and (2) showing alternating adsorption and desorption: I / compressed air input / A / adsorption; O / oxygen output / D / desorption; E / exhaust

Zeolite-based oxygen concentrator systems are widely used to produce medical-grade oxygen. The zeolite is used as a molecular sieve to create purified oxygen from air using its ability to trap impurities, in a process involving the adsorption of nitrogen, leaving highly purified oxygen and up to 5% argon.

Zeolites are also used as a molecular sieve in cryosorption style vacuum pumps.

=== Solar energy storage and use ===
Zeolites can be used to thermochemically store solar heat harvested from solar thermal collectors as first demonstrated by Guerra in 1978 and for adsorption refrigeration, as first demonstrated by Tchernev in 1974. In these applications, their high heat of adsorption and ability to hydrate and dehydrate while maintaining structural stability is exploited. This hygroscopic property coupled with an inherent exothermic (energy releasing) reaction when transitioning from a dehydrated form to a hydrated form make natural zeolites useful in harvesting waste heat and solar heat energy.

=== Building materials ===
Synthetic zeolites are used as an additive in the production process of warm mix asphalt concrete. The development of this application started in Germany in the 1990s. They help by decreasing the temperature level during manufacture and laying of asphalt concrete, resulting in lower consumption of fossil fuels, thus releasing less carbon dioxide, aerosols, and vapors. The use of synthetic zeolites in hot mixed asphalt leads to easier compaction and, to a certain degree, allows cold weather paving and longer hauls.

When added to Portland cement as a pozzolan, they can reduce chloride permeability and improve workability. They reduce weight and help moderate water content while allowing for slower drying, which improves break strength. When added to lime mortars and lime-metakaolin mortars, synthetic zeolite pellets can act simultaneously as a pozzolanic material and a water reservoir.

Zeolites have been studied as supplementary materials in cementitious mortars to improve mechanical performance and sustainability. Industrial waste-based zeolites, such as NaP-type and LTA-type zeolites derived from hazardous aluminum waste, can partially replace cement in mortars (5–15% substitution). The LTA-type zeolite, with smaller particle size, acts as a filler and nucleation site for cement hydrates, accelerating hydration and increasing early compressive strength. NaP-type zeolite, with higher silica content, promotes pozzolanic reactions that enhance long-term compressive strength of the mortars.

=== Niche uses ===
Non-clumping cat litter is often made of zeolite (or diatomite).

Zeolites are filter additives in aquaria, where they can be used to adsorb ammonia and other nitrogenous compounds. Due to the high affinity of some zeolites for calcium, they may be less effective in hard water and may deplete calcium. Zeolite filtration is also used in some marine aquaria to keep nutrient concentrations low for the benefit of corals adapted to nutrient-depleted waters.

=== Hemostatic agent ===
The original formulation of QuikClot brand hemostatic agent, which is used to stop severe bleeding, contained zeolite granules. When in contact with blood, the granules would rapidly absorb water from the blood plasma, creating an exothermic reaction which generated heat. The absorption of water would also concentrate clotting factors present within the blood, causing the clot formation process to occur much faster than under normal circumstances, as shown in vitro.

The 2022 formulation of QuikClot uses a nonwoven material impregnated with kaolin, an inorganic mineral activating Factor XII, in turn accelerating natural clotting. Unlike the original zeolite formulation, kaolin does not exhibit any thermogenic properties.

=== Soil treatment ===
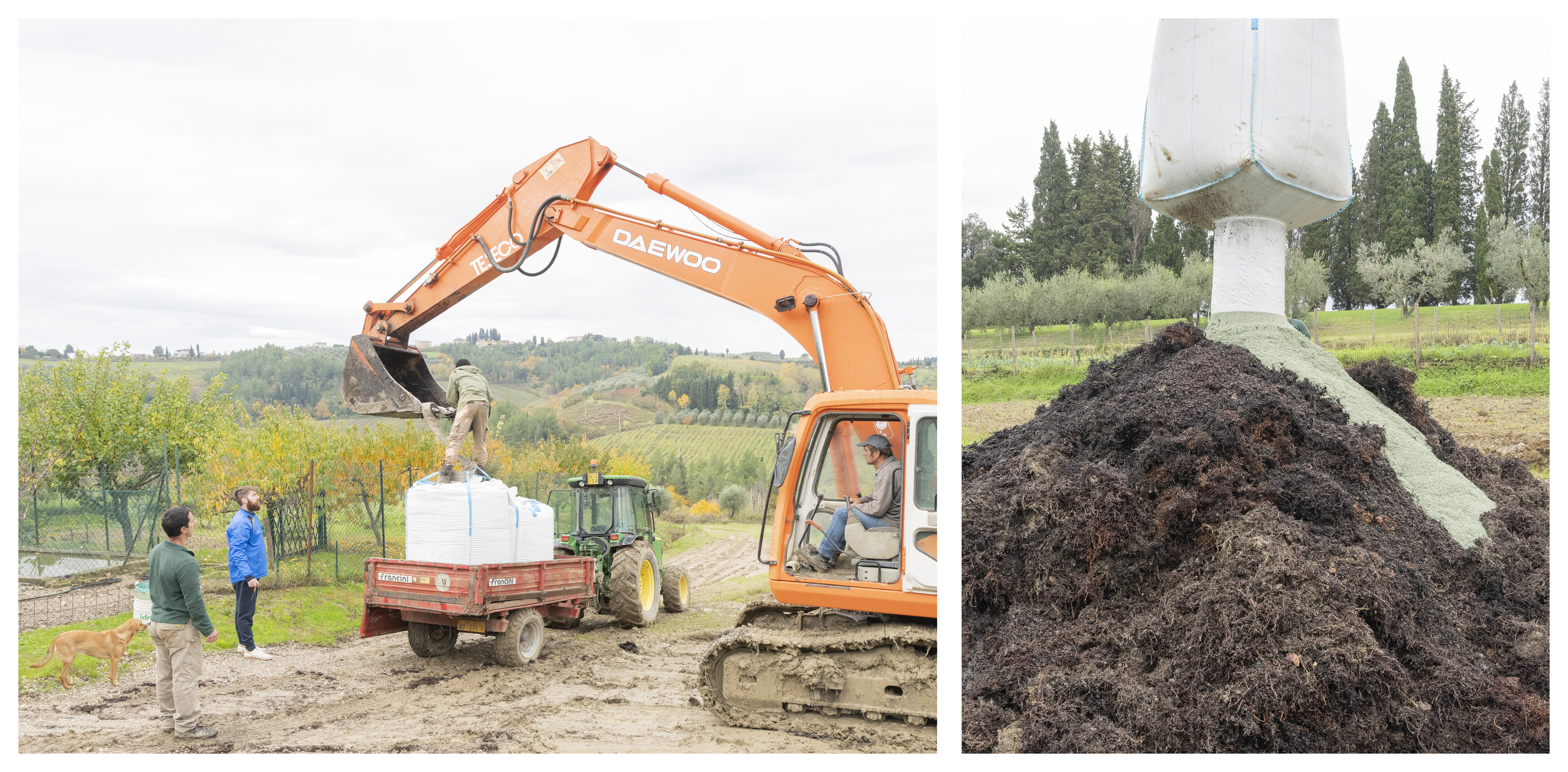
Mixing composted waste matter from wine production with zeolites

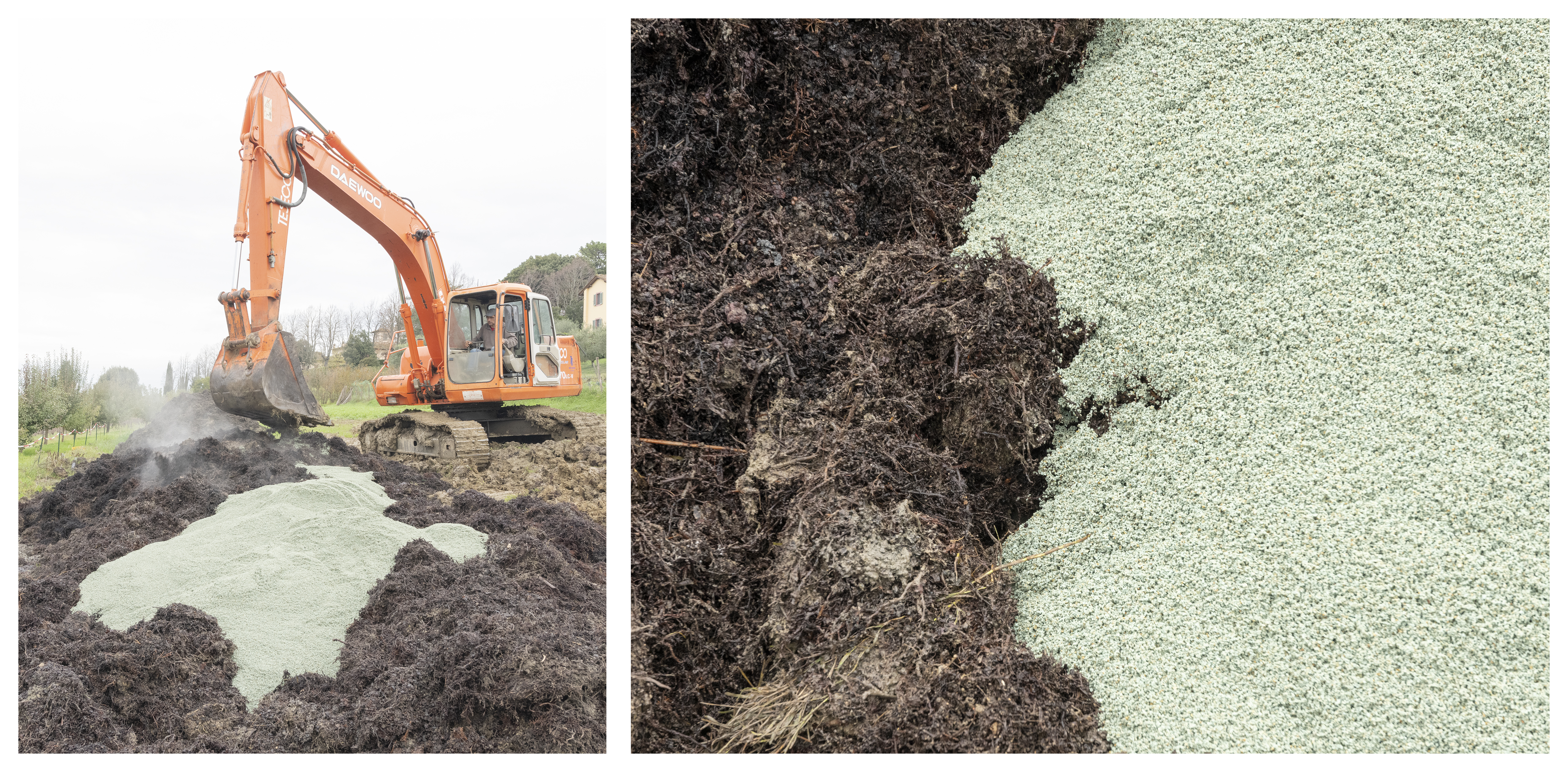
The microporous structure of the zeolites put into ground stabilizes water release and pH.

In agriculture, clinoptilolite (a naturally occurring zeolite) is used as a soil treatment. It provides a source of slowly released potassium. If previously loaded with ammonium, the zeolite can serve a similar function in the slow release of nitrogen.

Zeolites can also act as water moderators, in which they will absorb up to 55% of their weight in water and slowly release it under the plant's demand. This property can prevent root rot and moderate drought cycles.

=== Veterinary and human use ===
Zeolites have some veterinary applications, with clinoptilolite approved in the EU as an additive for cattle feed. It acts primarily as a detoxifying agent in the gut, where it can absorb undesirable species via ion-exchange before being excreted. For instance, nitrate fertilisers are water soluble and prolonged exposure by dairy cattle is known to impair protein metabolism and glucose utilization. Clinoptilolite adsorbs nitrate ions with good selectivity, allowing it to reduce these ill effects.

Zeolites have been studied for human medical applications, particularly for bowel conditions. There are no approved medical uses for zeolites as of 2024. Regardless, they are widely marketed as dietary supplements.

== Mineral species ==
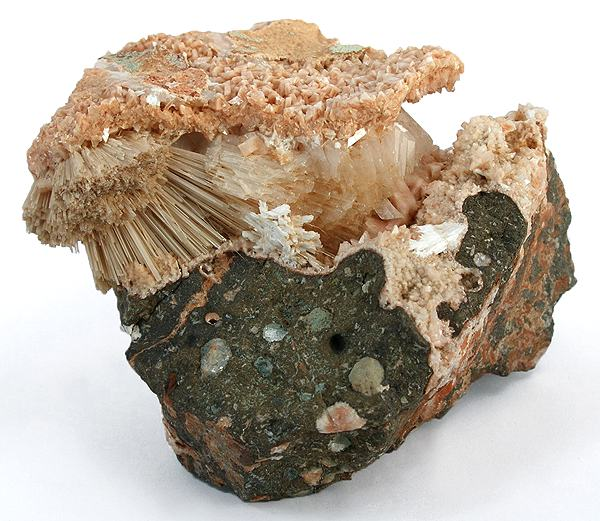
A combination specimen of four zeolite species. The radiating natrolite crystals are protected in a pocket with associated stilbite. The matrix around and above the pocket is lined with small, pink-colored laumontite crystals. Heulandite is also present as a crystal cluster on the backside.

The zeolite structural group (Nickel-Strunz classification) includes:

- 09.GA. – Zeolites with T_{5}O_{10} units (T = combined Si and Al): the fibrous zeolites
  - Natrolite framework (NAT): gonnardite, natrolite, mesolite, paranatrolite, scolecite, tetranatrolite
  - Edingtonite framework (EDI): edingtonite, kalborsite
  - Thomsonite framework (THO): thomsonite-series
- 09.GB. – Chains of single connected 4-membered rings
  - Analcime framework (ANA): analcime, leucite (topologically a zeolite despite being anhydrous; chemically a feldspathoid), pollucite, wairakite
  - Laumontite (LAU), yugawaralite (YUG), goosecreekite (GOO), montesommaite (MON)
- 09.GC. – Chains of doubly connected 4-membered rings
  - Phillipsite framework (PHI): harmotome, phillipsite-series
  - Gismondine framework (GIS): amicite, gismondine, garronite, gobbinsite
  - Boggsite (BOG), merlinoite (MER), mazzite-series (MAZ), paulingite-series (PAU), perlialite (Linde type L framework, zeolite L, LTL)
- 09.GD. – Chains of 6-membered rings: tabular zeolites
  - Chabazite framework (CHA): chabazite-series, herschelite, willhendersonite and SSZ-13
  - Faujasite framework (FAU): faujasite-series, Linde type X (zeolite X, X zeolites), Linde type Y (zeolite Y, Y zeolites)
  - Mordenite framework (MOR): maricopaite, mordenite
  - Offretite–wenkite subgroup 09.GD.25 (Nickel–Strunz, 10 ed): offretite (OFF), wenkite (WEN)
  - Bellbergite (TMA-E, Aiello and Barrer; framework type EAB), bikitaite (BIK), erionite-series (ERI), ferrierite (FER), gmelinite (GME), levyne-series (LEV), dachiardite-series (DAC), epistilbite (EPI)
- 09.GE. – Chains of T_{10}O_{20} tetrahedra (T = combined Si and Al)
  - Heulandite framework (HEU): clinoptilolite, heulandite-series
  - Stilbite framework (STI): barrerite, stellerite, stilbite-series
  - Brewsterite framework (BRE): brewsterite-series
- Others
  - Cowlesite, pentasil (also known as ZSM-5, framework type MFI), tschernichite (beta polymorph A, disordered framework, BEA), Linde type A framework (zeolite A, LTA)

== Hypothetical minerals ==
Hypothetical zeolites are combinatorial models of potential structures of these minerals. They are four-regular periodic graphs, with vertices representing the tetrahedral atom (usually Si or Al) and the edges representing the bridging oxygen atoms. Alternatively, by ignoring the tetrahedral atoms, zeolites can be represented by a six-valent periodic graph of oxygen atoms, with each O-O edge defining an edge of a tetrahedron.

At present there are millions of hypothetical zeolite frameworks known. For any fixed number of vertices, these are a small fraction of possible 4-regular periodic graphs, because the geometric constraints imposed by the chemistry of zeolites rules out most possibilities.

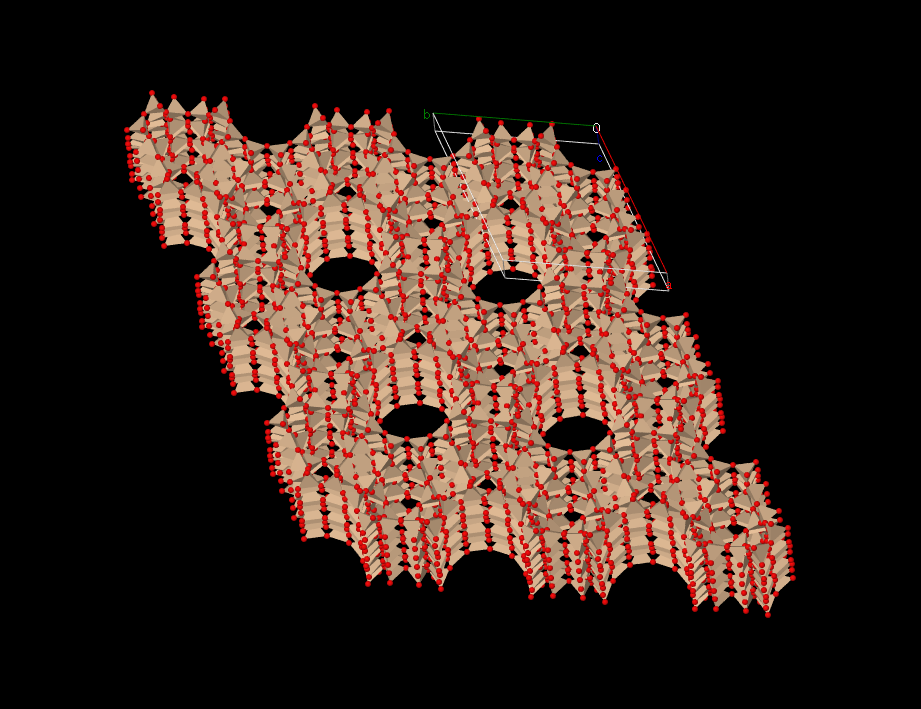
A hypothetical zeolite that has not been found in nature.

=== Enumeration methods ===
There are several methods for enumerating zeolite frameworks. The method of Earl et al. uses simulated annealing to arrange a fixed number of tetrahedral atoms under periodic symmetry constraints. The method of Sartbaeva et al. uses combinatorial enumeration to identify four-valent graphs under fixed symmetry and fixed number of tetrahedral atoms. This is then followed by a simulated annealing embedding of the candidate graph into the 3-dimensional torus. Ockwig et al. tile polyhedra to fill space and generate four-valent graphs.

=== Open questions ===
There many open questions, among them:

- Why there is such a large discrepancy between the number of hypothetical zeolites and the number of zeolite frameworks observed in nature?
- Can the pore structure of a hypothetical zeolite be predicted only from its periodic graph?

== Computational study ==
Computer calculations have predicted that millions of hypothetical zeolite structures are possible. However, only 232 of these structures have been discovered and synthesized so far. Many scientists studying zeolite question why only this small fraction of possibilities are observed. One explanation is that certain frameworks may be inaccessible, as nucleation cannot occur because more stable and energetically favorable zeolites will form. Post-synthetic modification has been used to combat this issue with the ADOR method, A theory of crystallization via solute pre-nucleation clusters was developed. Investigation of zeolite crystallization in hydrated silicate ionic liquids (HSIL) has shown that zeolites can nucleate via the condensation of ion-paired pre-nucleation clusters.

== Fibrous zeolites ==
The majority of zeolites are nontoxic. The fibrous zeolite erionite has been linked to lung cancer (malignant mesothelioma). In fact, erionite is far more potent then any of the 6 asbestos minerals. Other possible asbestiform zeolites with ongoing research (or more research needed) into their possible toxicty include: ferrierite (leading candidate for toxicity due to being very similar chemically and habit as erionite), mordenite, mesolite thomsonite, natrolite, and scolecite.

== See also ==
- Adsorption – Phenomenon of surface adhesion
- Geopolymer – Polymeric Si–O–Al framework similar to zeolites but amorphous
- Hypothetical zeolite – Microporous, aluminosilicate mineral group
- List of minerals
- Pyrolysis – Thermal decomposition of materials
- Solid sorbents for carbon capture – Materials that absorb carbon dioxide
