= Mesolite =

Zeolite mineral in the natrolite subgroup

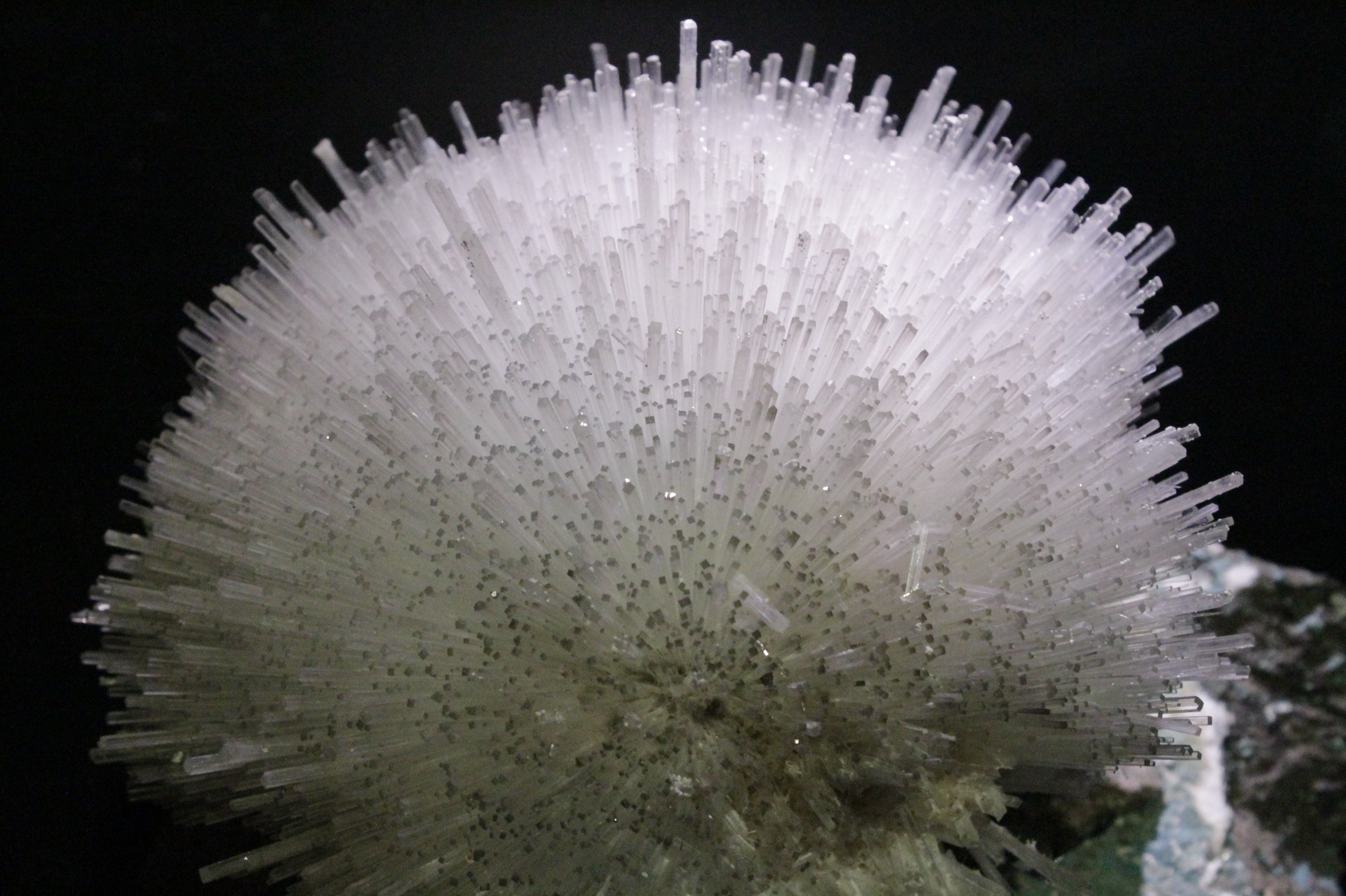
- Mesolite from Bombay collected in the 18th century by Dr John Hunter

General
- Category: Tectosilicate minerals
- Group: Zeolite group, natrolite subgroup
- Formula: Na_{2}Ca_{2}Si_{9}Al_{6}O_{30}·8H_{2}O
- IMA symbol: Mes
- Strunz classification: 9.GA.05
- Crystal system: Orthorhombic
- Crystal class: Pyramidal (mm2) (same H-M symbol)
- Space group: Fdd2
- Unit cell: a = 18.4049(8) Å, b = 56.655(6) Å, c = 6.5443(4) Å; Z = 8

Identification
- Color: Colorless, white, gray, yellowish brown
- Crystal habit: As elongated prismatic crystals, commonly in hairlike tufts and aggregates of fibers;(sometimes found in asbestiform); radiating compact masses; stalactitic; porcelaneous
- Twinning: Characteristically twinned on {010} or {100}
- Cleavage: Perfect on {110} and {11̅0}
- Fracture: Uneven
- Tenacity: Brittle, masses tough
- Mohs scale hardness: 5
- Luster: Vitreous, silky when fibrous
- Streak: White
- Diaphaneity: Transparent to translucent, opaque
- Specific gravity: 2.26
- Optical properties: Biaxial (+)
- Refractive index: nα = 1.505 nβ = 1.505 nγ = 1.505
- Birefringence: δ = 0.001
- 2V angle: Measured: 80°
- Other characteristics: May exhibit a small pyroelectric effect; piezoelectric

Mesolite is a tectosilicate mineral with formula Na_{2}Ca_{2}Si_{9}Al_{6}O_{30}·8H_{2}O. It is a member of the zeolite group and the natrolite subgroup, also resembling natrolite in appearance.

Mesolite crystallizes in the orthorhombic system and typically forms fibrous, acicular prismatic crystals or masses. Radiating sprays of needlelike crystals are not uncommon. It is vitreous in luster and clear to white in color. It has a Mohs hardness of 5 to 5.5 and a low specific gravity of 2.2 to 2.4. The refractive indices are nα=1.505 nβ=1.505 nγ=1.506.

== Occurrence ==
It was first described in 1816 for an occurrence in the Cyclopean Islands near Catania, Sicily. From the Greek mesos, "middle", as its composition lies between natrolite and scolecite. Like other zeolites, mesolite occurs as void fillings in amygdaloidal basalt also in andesites and hydrothermal veins.

== Images ==
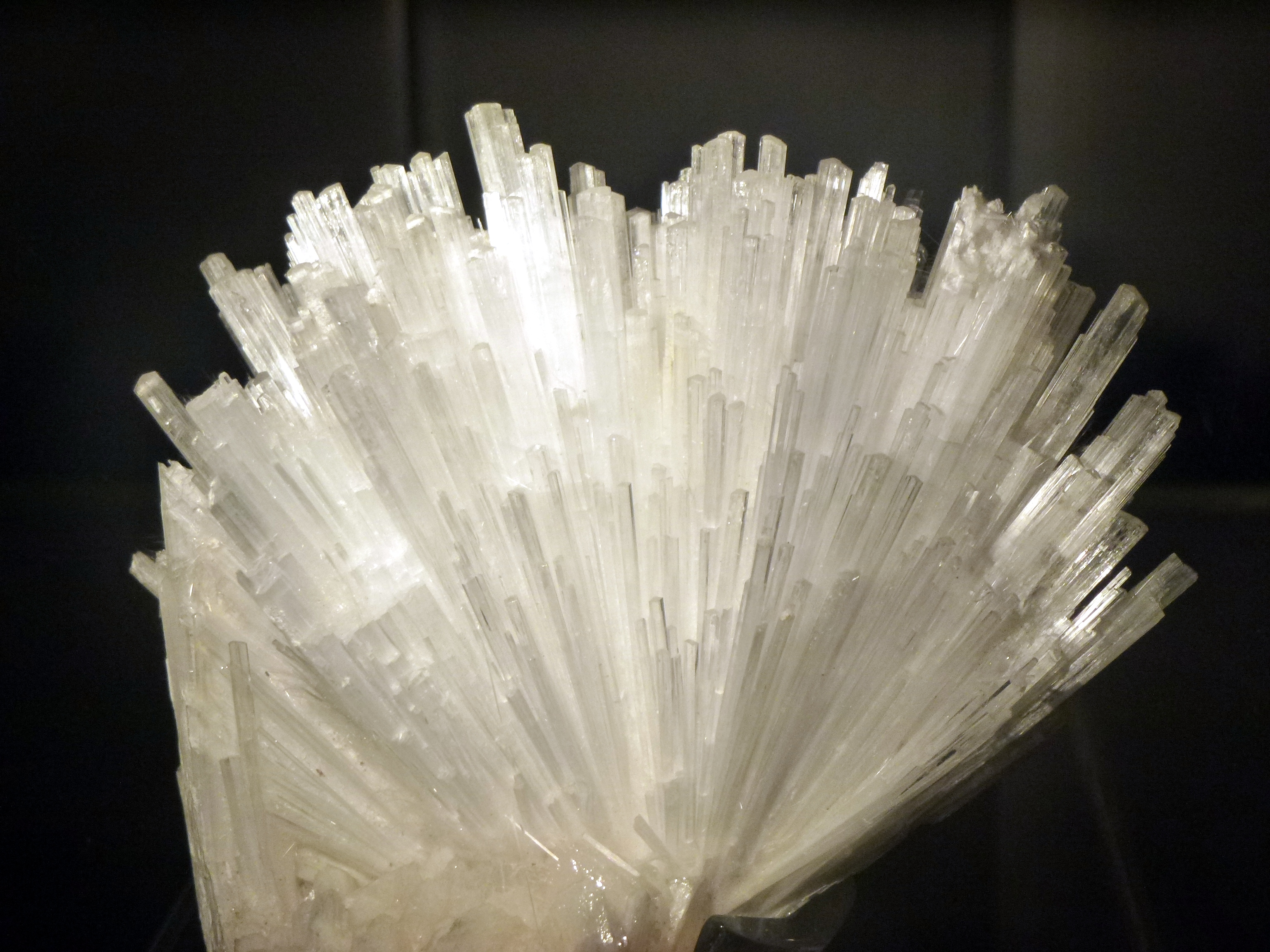
Mesolite

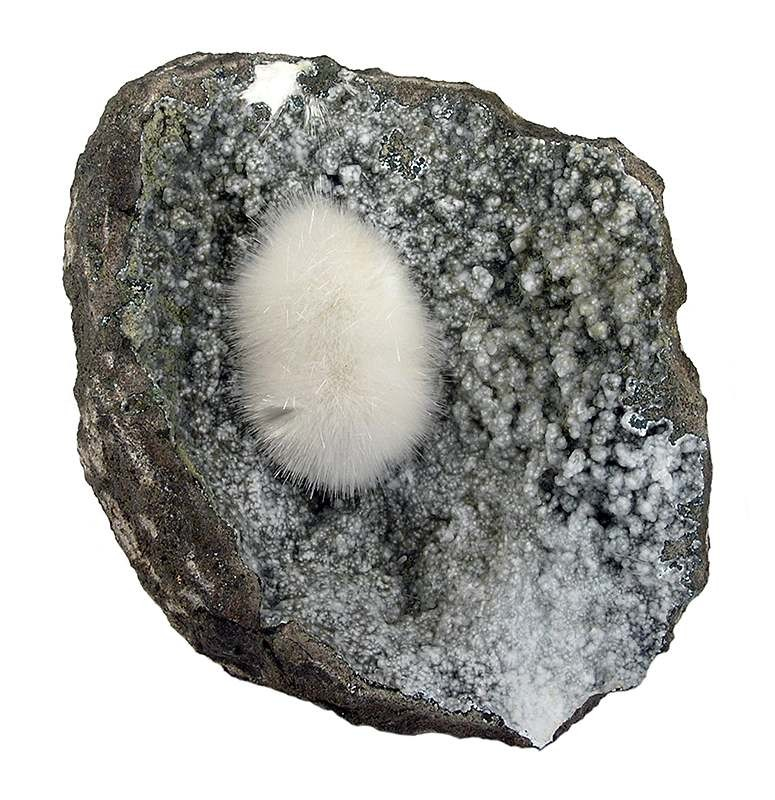
"Puff ball" of mesolite in a basaltic vug

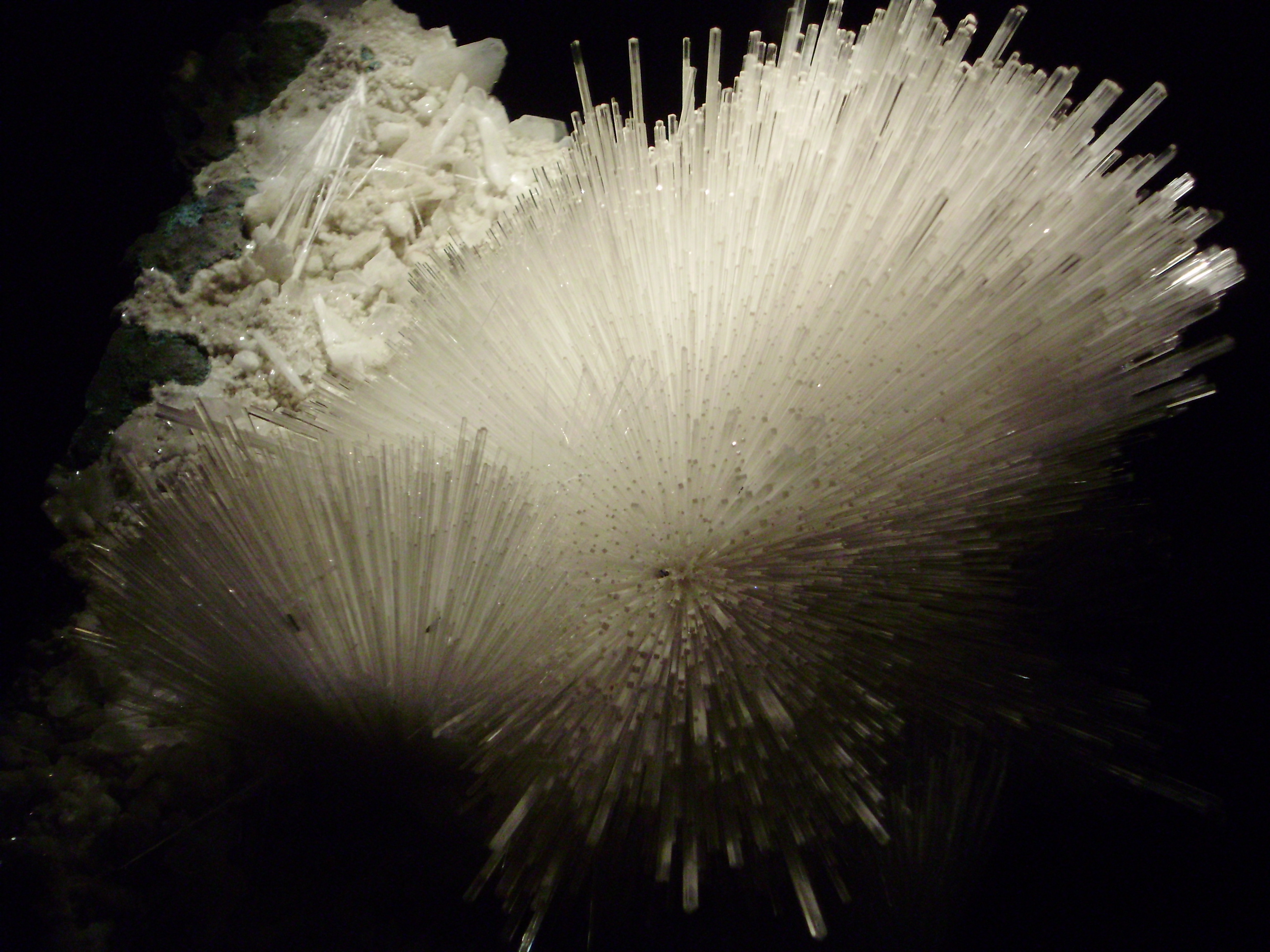
Mesolite often forms in fibrous crystals

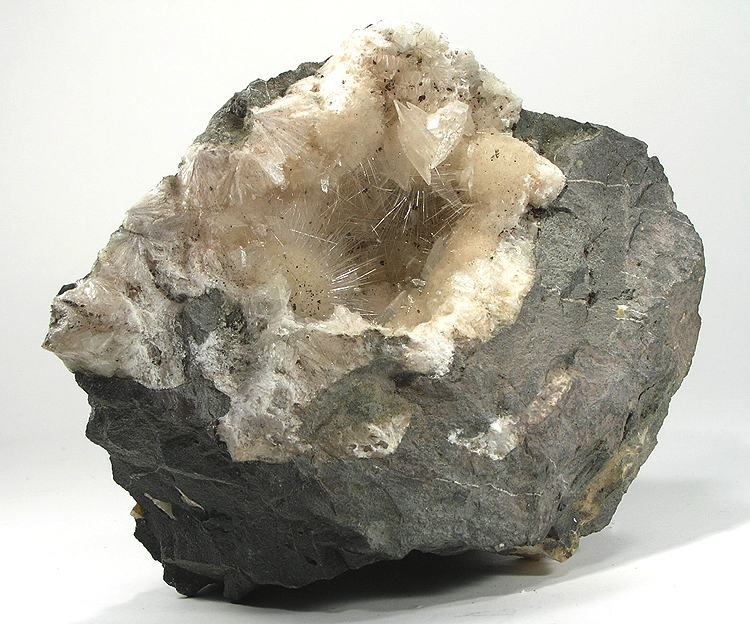
A pocket of hairlike acicular crystals of mesolite growing off thomsonite

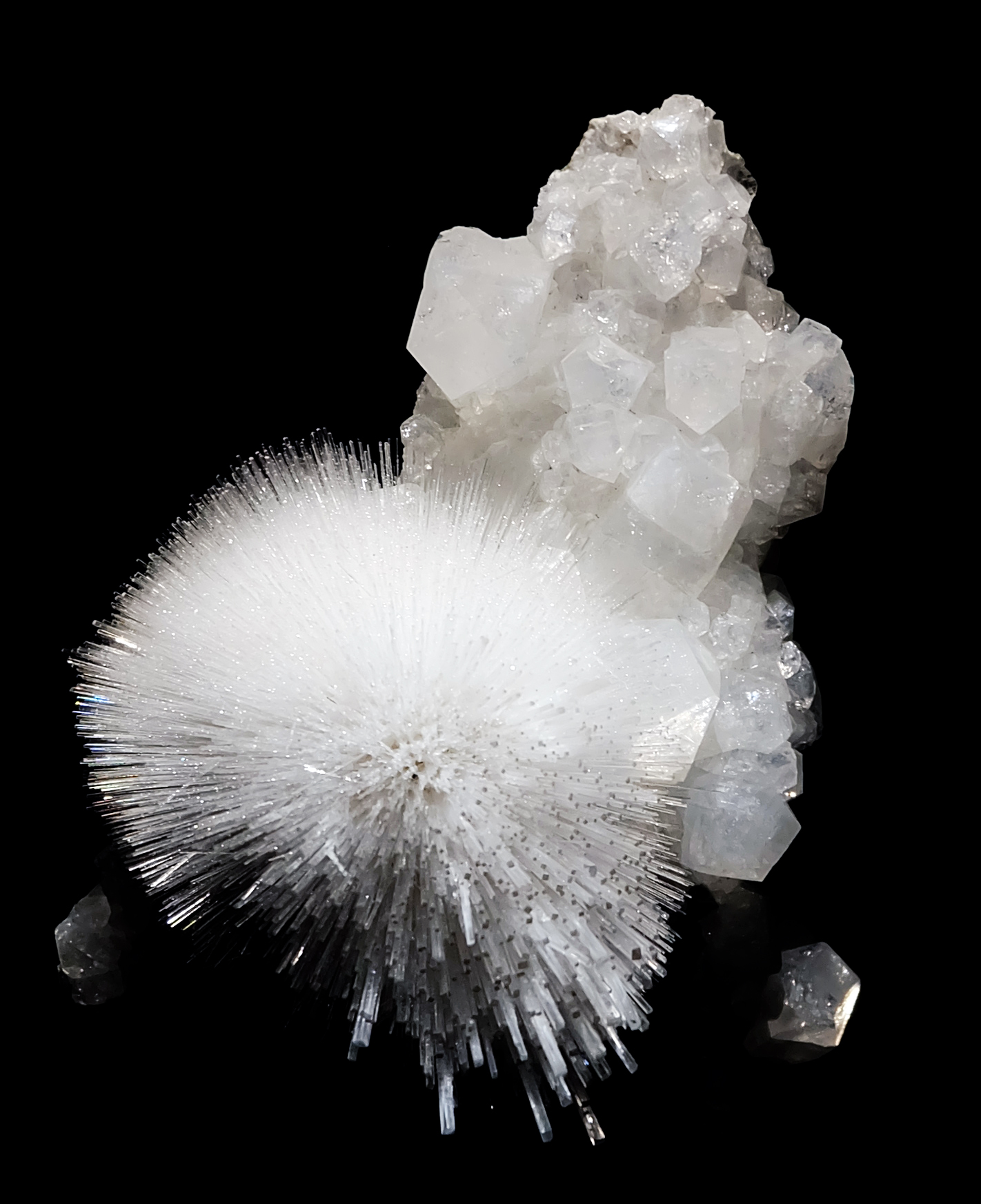
Fibrous crystal sample retrieved from caverns near Pune, India
