= Thomsonite =

Thomsonite series of the zeolite group

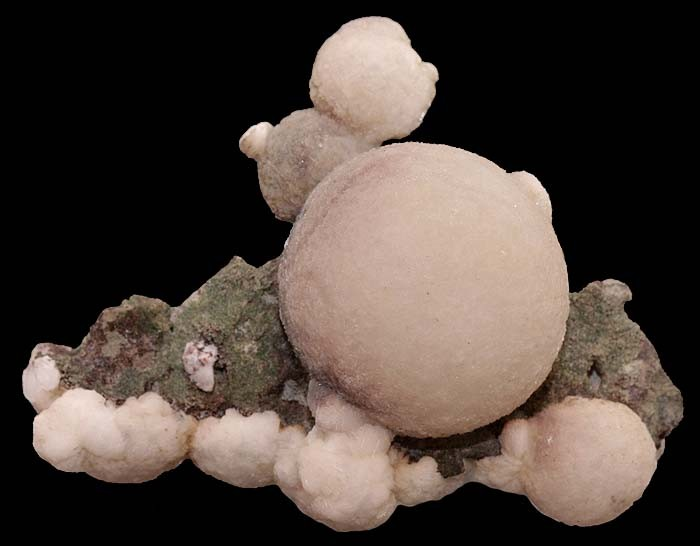

General
- Category: Tectosilicate minerals
- Group: Zeolite group
- Formula: NaCa_{2}Al_{5}Si_{5}O_{20}·6H_{2}O
- IMA symbol: Thm
- Strunz classification: 9.GA.10
- Crystal system: Orthorhombic
- Crystal class: Dipyramidal (mmm); H-M symbol: (2/m 2/m 2/m)

Identification
- Color: colorless, white, beige, and pink
- Cleavage: perfect on {010}; good on {100}
- Mohs scale hardness: 5–5 1/2
- Luster: vitreous, pearly
- Streak: white
- Diaphaneity: transparent to translucent
- Specific gravity: 2.23–2.29

Thomsonite is the name of a series of tectosilicate minerals of the zeolite group. Prior to 1997, thomsonite was recognized as a mineral species, but a reclassification in 1997 by the International Mineralogical Association changed it to a series name, with the mineral species being named thomsonite-Ca and thomsonite-Sr. Thomsonite-Ca, by far the more common of the two, is a hydrous sodium, calcium and aluminium silicate, NaCa_{2}Al_{5}Si_{5}O_{20}·6H_{2}O. Strontium can substitute for the calcium and the appropriate species name depends on the dominant element. The species are visually indistinguishable and the series name thomsonite is used whenever testing has not been performed. Globally, thomsonite is one of the rarer zeolites.

Thomsonite was first identified in material from Scotland in 1820. It is named for the Scottish chemist Thomas Thomson. The crystal system of thomsonite is orthorhombic. The Mohs hardness is 5 to 5.5. It is transparent to translucent and has a density of 2.3 to 2.4. It may be colorless, white, beige, or somewhat green, yellow, or red. The crystals tend to be long thin blades that typically form radial aggregates, and sometimes fans and tufts. The aggregates are variable and may be spikey in appearance, dense and ball-like, or form worm-like growths. Tight acicular radiating clusters and sphericules are common forms.

Thomsonite occurs with other zeolites in the amygdaloidal cavities of basaltic volcanic rocks, and occasionally in granitic pegmatites. Examples have been found in Faroe Islands (var. Faroelite), Scotland, Arkansas, Colorado, Michigan, Minnesota, New Jersey, Oregon, Ontario, Nova Scotia, Gujarat (India), and the Ural Mountains (Russia).

Nodules of massive thomsonite that display an attractive banded coloring are found along the shore of Lake Superior. Most of these thomsonite nodules and their derived pebbles are less than 0.6 cm (1/4 inch). Those enclosed in basalt are extremely difficult to remove without breaking them. Consequently, a very large percentage of those used as gemstones are from pebbles collected from beaches.
