= Phillipsite =

Mineral series in the zeolite group

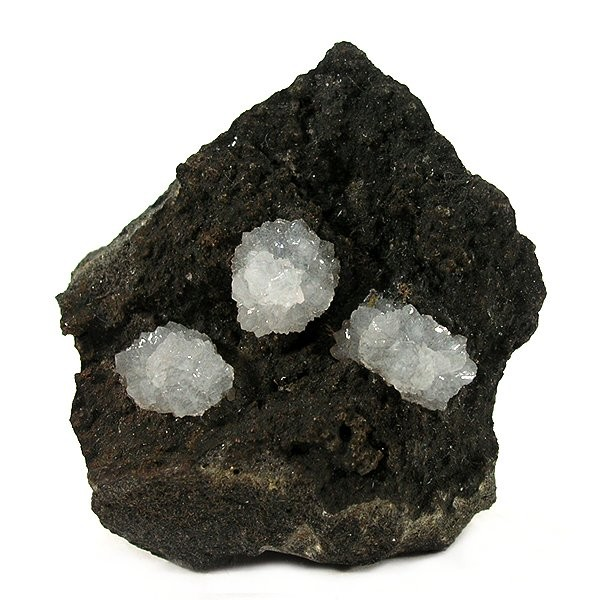

General
- Category: Tectosilicate minerals
- Group: Zeolite group, phillipsite subgroup
- Formula: (Ca,Na_{2},K_{2})_{3}Al_{6}Si_{10}O_{32}·12H_{2}O
- Strunz classification: 9.GC.10
- Crystal system: Monoclinic
- Crystal class: Prismatic (2/m) (same H-M symbol)
- Space group: P2_{1}/m

Identification
- Color: White
- Mohs scale hardness: 4 – 4.5
- Luster: Vitreous
- Streak: White
- Specific gravity: 2.2
- Optical properties: Biaxial (+/−)
- Refractive index: n_{α} = 1.483 – 1.505 n_{β} = 1.484 – 1.511 n_{γ} = 1.486 – 1.514
- Birefringence: δ = 0.003 – 0.009
- 2V angle: 60 to 90° measured

Phillipsite is a mineral series of the zeolite group; a hydrated potassium, calcium and aluminium silicate, approximating to (Ca,Na_{2},K_{2})_{3}Al_{6}Si_{10}O_{32}·12H_{2}O. The members of the series are phillipsite-K, phillipsite-Na and phillipsite-Ca. The crystals are monoclinic, but only complex cruciform twins are known, these being exactly like twins of harmotome which also forms a series with phillipsite-Ca. Crystals of phillipsite are, however, usually smaller and more transparent and glassy than those of harmotome. Spherical groups with a radially fibrous structure and bristled with crystals on the surface are not uncommon. The Mohs hardness is 4.5, and the specific gravity is 2.2. The species was established by Armand Lévy in 1825 and named after William Phillips. French authors use the name Christianite (after Christian VIII of Denmark), given by A. Des Cloizeaux in 1847.

Phillipsite is a mineral of secondary origin, and occurs with other zeolites in the amygdaloidal cavities of mafic volcanic rocks: for example in the basalt of the Giants Causeway in County Antrim, and near Melbourne in Victoria; and in Lencitite near Rome. Small crystals of recent formation have been observed in the masonry of the hot baths at Plombires and Bourbonne-les-Bains, in France. Minute spherical aggregates embedded in pelagic red clay were dredged by the Challenger from deep sea sedimentary deposits in the Pacific Ocean.

It has been discovered that the volcanic ash that Romans employed in the mix for construction of harbor piers and sea walls contained phillipsite, and that an interaction with sea water actually causes crystalline aluminous tobermorite structures in the mortar to expand and strengthen, making the material substantially more durable than modern concrete.

== See also ==
- List of minerals
- List of minerals named after people
- Roman Concrete
