= Heulandite =

Series of tectosilicate minerals of the zeolite group

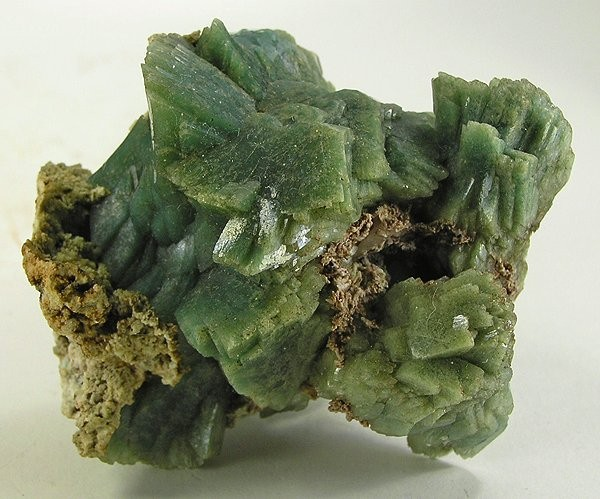

General
- Category: Tectosilicate minerals
- Group: Zeolite group
- Formula: (Na,Ca,K)_{5−6}[Al_{8−9}Si_{27−28}O_{72}]·nH_{2}O
- IMA symbol: Hul
- Strunz classification: 9.GE.05
- Crystal system: Monoclinic; More than one space group
- Crystal class: Prismatic (2/m) (same H-M symbol)

Identification
- Colour: colourless, yellow, green, white, pale pink
- Crystal habit: tabular, parallel aggregates
- Cleavage: perfect basal
- Mohs scale hardness: 3.5–4
- Lustre: pearly, vitreous
- Streak: white
- Diaphaneity: transparent to translucent

Heulandite is the name of a series of tectosilicate minerals of the zeolite group. Prior to 1997, heulandite was recognized as a mineral species, but a reclassification in 1997 by the International Mineralogical Association changed it to a series name, with the mineral species being named:

- Heulandite-Ca
- Heulandite-Na
- Heulandite-K
- Heulandite-Sr
- Heulandite-Ba (described in 2002).

Heulandite-Ca, the most common of these, is a hydrous calcium and aluminium silicate with the formula (Ca,Na)_{5}(Si_{27}Al_{9})O_{72}·26H_{2}O. Small amounts of sodium and potassium are usually present replacing part of the calcium. Strontium replaces calcium in the heulandite-Sr variety. The appropriate species name depends on the dominant element. The species are visually indistinguishable, and the series name heulandite is still used whenever testing has not been performed.

== Crystallography and properties ==
Crystals are monoclinic. They may have a characteristic coffin-shaped habit, but may also form simple rhombic prisms. Frequently, a crust of fine crystals will form with only the ends of the rhombs visible, making the crystals look like wedges. They have a perfect cleavage parallel to the plane of symmetry, on which the lustre is markedly pearly; on other faces the lustre is of the vitreous type. The mineral is usually colourless or white, but may be orange, brown, yellow, brick-red, or green due to inclusions of celadonite. It varies from transparent to translucent. Isomorphous with heulandite is the strontium and barium zeolite brewsterite.

The Mohs hardness is 3–4, and the specific gravity 2.2. Heulandite is similar to stilbite. The two minerals may, however, be readily distinguished by the fact that in heulandite the acute positive bisectrix of the optic axes emerges perpendicular to the cleavage.

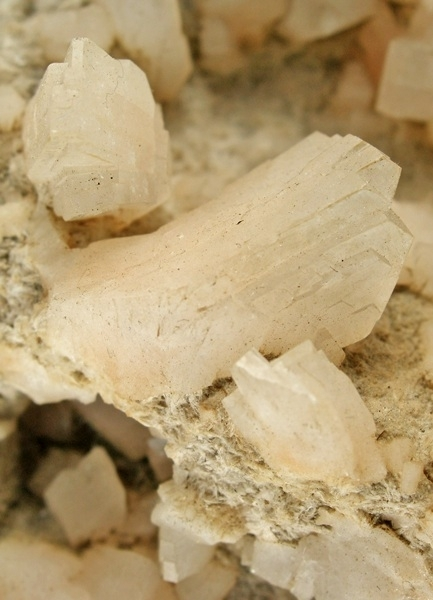
Heulandite, Berufjördur, Suður-Múlasýsla, Iceland. Clusters of pearlescent, curved heulandite crystals cover the vuggy, thin basalt matrix. Heulandite crystals are up to 2 cm.

== Discovery and occurrence ==
Heulandite was first separated from stilbite by August Breithaupt in 1818, and named by him "euzeolite" (meaning beautiful zeolite); independently, in 1822, H. J. Brooke arrived at the same result, giving the name heulandite, after the mineral collector, John Henry Heuland (1778–1856).

Heulandite occurs with stilbite and other zeolites in the amygdaloidal cavities of basaltic volcanic rocks, and occasionally in gneiss and hydrothermal veins. It forms at temperatures below about 100 °C (212 °F), and so its presence in sedimentary rocks indicates that these have experienced shallow diagenesis.

Good specimens have been found in the basalts of Berufjörður, near Djúpivogur, in Iceland, the Faroe Islands and the Deccan Traps of the Sahyadri Mountains of Maharashtra near Mumbai. Crystals of a brick-red colour are from Campsie Fells in Stirlingshire and the Fassa valley in Trentino. A variety known as beaumontite occurs as small yellow crystals on syenitic schist near Baltimore, Maryland.
