= Mineral group =

Grouping of mineral species by crystal structure and composition

In geology and mineralogy, a mineral group is a set of mineral species with essentially the same crystal structure and composed of chemically similar elements.

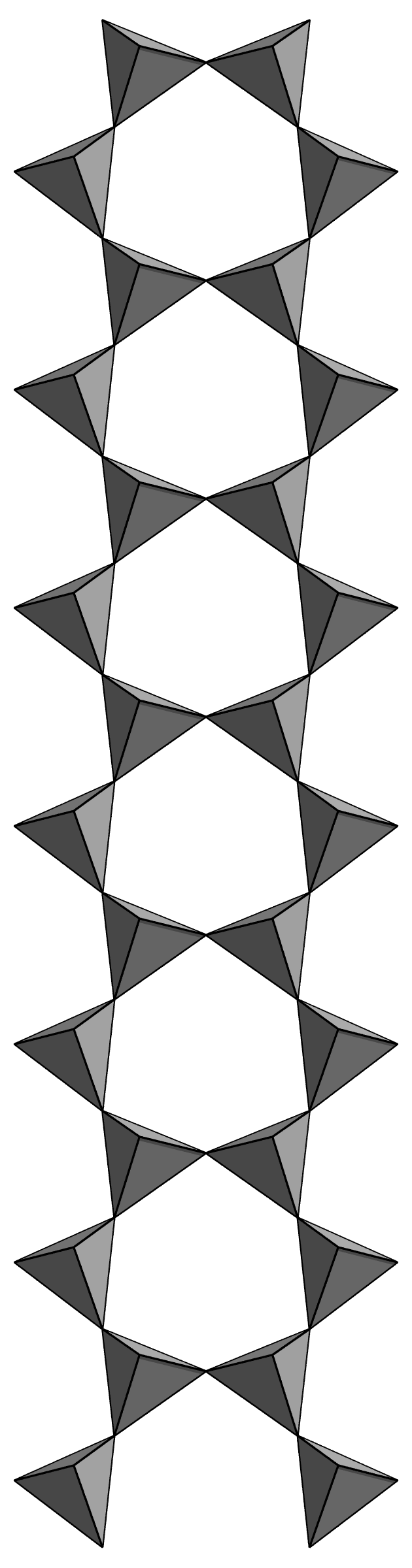
Silicon-oxygen double chain in the anions of amphibole minerals.

For example, the amphibole group consists of 15 or more mineral species, most of them with the general unit formula A_{x}B_{y}C_{14-3x-2y}Si_{8}O_{22}(OH)_{2}, where A is a trivalent cation such as Fe^{3+} or Al^{3+}, B is a divalent cation such as Fe^{2+}, Ca^{2+}, or Mg^{2+}, and C is an alkali metal cation such as Li^{+}, Na^{+}, or K^{+}. In all these minerals, the anions consist mainly of groups of four SiO_{4} tetrahedra connected by shared oxygen corners so as to form a double chain of fused six-member rings. In some of the species, aluminum Al^{3+} may replace some silicon atoms Si^{4+} in the backbone, with extra B or C cations to balance the charges.

== List of groups ==
- Alunite group
- Amphibole group
- Aragonite group
- Arsenic minerals
- Blodite group
- Calcite group
- Cancrinite group
- Clay minerals group
- Descloizite group
- Dolomite group
- Epidote group
- Feldspar group
- Feldspathoid
- Garnet group
- Hematite group
- Humite group
- Ilmenite group
- Langbeinites
- Mica group
- Pyroxene group
- Rutile group
- Serpentine group
- Smectite group
- Sodalite group
- Spinel group
- Tetradymite group

== See also ==
- Mineral
- Mineral variety
