= Classification of silicate minerals =

List of IMA recognized minerals and groupings

This list gives an overview of the classification of minerals (silicates) and includes mostly International Mineralogical Association (IMA) recognized minerals and its groupings. This list complements the List of minerals recognized by the International Mineralogical Association series of articles and List of minerals. Rocks, ores, mineral mixtures, non-IMA approved minerals and non-named minerals are mostly excluded.

== Classification of minerals ==
=== Introduction ===
The grouping of the New Dana Classification and of the mindat.org is similar only, and so this classification is an overview only. Consistency is missing too on the group name endings (group, subgroup, series) between New Dana Classification and mindat.org. Category, class and supergroup name endings are used as layout tools in the list as well.

==== Abbreviations ====
- "*" – mineral not IMA-approved.
- "^{Q}" – doubtful/questionable.
- Rn – renaming.
- Rd – redefinition.
- "REE" – rare-earth element (Sc, Y, La, Ce, Pr, Nd, Pm, Sm, Eu, Gd, Tb, Dy, Ho, Er, Tm, Yb, Lu).
- "PGE" – platinum-group element (Ru, Rh, Pd, Os, Ir, Pt).
- "s.p." – special procedure.

=== Category '9': silicate minerals ===
- Unclassified silicates

==== Subclass '9.A': nesosilicates ====
- Zircon group: MSiO_{4} (a group of simple tetragonal silicates where M = tetravalent Zr, Th, or Hf)
  - Hafnon HfSiO_{4}, Stetindite Ce[SiO_{4}], Thorite (Th,U)SiO_{4}, Zircon ZrSiO_{4}, Coffinite U(SiO_{4})_{1−x}(OH)_{4x}, Thorogummite Th(SiO_{4})_{1−x}(OH)_{4x}, IMA2008-035 CeSiO_{4}
- Olivine group
  - Calcio-Olivine Ca_{2}SiO_{4}, Fayalite (Fe^{2+})_{2}[SiO_{4}], Forsterite Mg_{2}[SiO_{4}], Laihunite Fe^{2+}(Fe^{3+})_{2}(SiO_{4})_{2}, Liebenbergite (Ni,Mg)_{2}[SiO_{4}], Olivine (Mg,Fe^{2+})_{2}[SiO_{4}], Tephroite (Mn^{2+})_{2}[SiO_{4}]
- Phenakite group
  - Phenakite Be_{2}SiO_{4}, Willemite Zn_{2}SiO_{4}, Eucryptite LiAlSiO_{4}
- Al_{2}(SiO_{4})O
  - Sillimanite subgroup
    - Sillimanite Al^{[6]}Al^{[4]}OSiO_{4}, Mullite Al_{(4+2x)}Si_{(2−2x)}O_{(10−x)} (x=0.17 to 0.59), Boromullite Al_{4.5}SiB_{0.5}O_{9.5}
  - Andalusite subgroup
    - Andalusite Al^{[6]}Al^{[5]}OSiO_{4}, Kanonaite (Mn^{3+},Al)AlSiO_{5}, Yoderite Mg_{2}(Al,Fe^{3+})_{6}Si_{4}O_{18}(OH)_{2}
  - Kyanite Al^{[6]}Al^{[6]}OSiO_{4}
- Titanite group
  - Titanite CaTiSiO_{5}, Malayaite CaSnOSiO_{4}, Vanadomalayaite CaVOSiO_{4}
- Cerite group
  - Cerite-(Ce) (Ce^{3+})_{9}Fe^{3+}(SiO_{4})_{6}[(SiO_{3})(OH)](OH)_{3}, Cerite-(La) (La,Ce,Ca)_{9}(Mg,Fe^{3+})(SiO_{4})_{6}[SiO_{3}(OH)](OH)_{3}, Aluminocerite-(Ce) (Ce,REE,Ca)_{9}(Al,Fe^{3+})(SiO_{4})_{3}[SiO_{3}(OH)]_{4}(OH)_{3}
- Silicate apatites
  - Ellestadite* Ca_{5}(SiO_{4},PO_{4},SO_{4})_{3}(F,OH,Cl), Britholite-(Ce) (Ce,Ca,Th,La,Nd)_{5}(SiO_{4},PO_{4})_{3}(OH,F), Britholite-(Y) (Y,Ca)_{5}(SiO_{4},PO_{4})_{3}(OH,F), Ellestadite-(F) Ca_{5}(SiO_{4},PO_{4},SO_{4})_{3}(F,OH,Cl), Ellestadite-(OH) Ca_{5}(SiO_{4},SO_{4})_{3}(OH,Cl,F), Ellestadite-(Cl) Ca_{5}(SiO_{4},PO_{4},SO_{4})_{3}(Cl,OH,F), Mattheddleite Pb_{20}(SiO_{4})_{7}(SO_{4})_{4}Cl_{4}, Karnasurtite-(Ce) (Ce,La,Th)(Ti,Nb)(Al,Fe^{3+})(Si,P)_{2}O_{7}(OH)_{4}·3(H_{2}O) (?), Fluorbritholite-(Ce) (Ca,Ce,La,Na)_{5}(SiO_{4},PO_{4})_{3}(OH,F), Fluorcalciobritholite (Ca,REE)_{5}[(Si,P)O_{4}]_{3}F
- Uranophane group
  - Kasolite Pb(UO_{2})SiO_{4}·H_{2}O, Uranophane Ca(UO_{2})_{2}SiO_{3}(OH)_{2}·5H_{2}O, Sklodowskite (H_{3}O)_{2}Mg(UO_{2})_{2}(SiO_{4})_{2}·4H_{2}O, Cuprosklodowskite Cu[(UO_{2})(SiO_{2}OH)]_{2}·6H_{2}O, Boltwoodite HK(UO_{2})(SiO_{4})·1.5H_{2}O, Natroboltwoodite (H_{3}O)(Na,K)(UO_{2})SiO_{4}·H_{2}O, Oursinite (Co,Mg)(H_{3}O)_{2}[(UO_{2})SiO_{4}]_{2}·3H_{2}O, Swamboite U^{7+}H_{6}(UO_{2})_{6}(SiO_{4})_{6}·30H_{2}O, Uranophane-beta Ca[(UO_{2})SiO_{3}(OH)]_{2}·H_{2}O
- Datolite group
  - Datolite series
    - Datolite CaBSiO_{4}(OH), Hingganite-(Ce) (Ce,Ca)_{2}(☐,Fe)Be_{2}Si_{2}O_{8}[(OH),O]_{2}, Hingganite-(Y) Y_{2}(☐)Be_{2}Si_{2}O_{8}(OH)_{2}, Hingganite-(Yb) (Yb,Y)_{2}(☐)Be_{2}Si_{2}O_{8}(OH)_{2}, Calcybeborosilite-(Y) (REE,Ca)_{2}☐(B,Be)_{2}(SiO_{4})_{2}(OH,O)_{2}
  - Homilite series
    - Bakerite Ca_{4}B_{4}(BO_{4})(SiO_{4})_{3}(OH)_{3}·H_{2}O, Gadolinite-(Ce) (Ce,La,Nd,Y)_{2}Fe^{2+}Be_{2}Si_{2}O_{10}, Gadolinite-(Y) Y_{2}Fe^{2+}Be_{2}Si_{2}O_{10}, Calciogadolinite? CaREE(Fe^{3+})Be_{2}Si_{2}O_{10}, Homilite Ca_{2}(Fe^{2+},Mg)B_{2}Si_{2}O_{10}, Minasgeraisite-(Y) CaY_{2}Be_{2}Si_{2}O_{10}
- Hellandite group
  - Hellandite-(Y) (Ca,REE)_{4}(Y,Ce)_{2}(Al,☐)_{2}[Si_{4}B_{4}O_{22}](OH)_{2}
  - Tadzhikite-(Y) Ca_{4}(Y,Ce)_{2}(Ti,Al,Fe^{3+},☐)_{2}[Si_{4}B_{4}O_{22}](OH)_{2}
  - Tadzhikite-(Ce) Ca_{4}(Ce,Y)_{2}(Ti,Al,Fe^{3+},☐)_{2}[Si_{4}B_{4}O_{22}](OH)_{2}
  - Hellandite-(Ce) (Ca_{3}REE)_{4}Ce_{2}Al☐_{2}[Si_{4}B_{4}O_{22}](OH)_{2}
  - Mottanaite-(Ce) Ca_{4}(Ce,Ca)_{2}AlBe_{2}[Si_{4}B_{4}O_{22}]O_{2}
  - Ciprianiite Ca_{4}[(Th,U)(REE)]_{2}(Al,☐)_{2}[Si_{4}B_{4}O_{22}](OH,F)_{2}
  - Piergorite-(Ce) Ca_{8}Ce_{2}(Al_{0.5}(Fe^{3+})_{0.5})(☐,Li,Be)_{2}Si_{6}B_{8}O_{36}(OH,F)_{2}
- Vicanite group
  - Vicanite-(Ce) (Ca,Ce,La,Th)_{15}As^{5+}(As^{3+}_{0.5},Na_{0.5})Fe^{3+}Si_{6}B_{4}O_{40}F_{7}
  - Hundholmenite-(Y) (Y,REE,Ca,Na)_{15}(Al,Fe^{3+})Ca_{x}(As^{3+})_{1−x}(Si,As^{5+})Si_{6}B_{3}(O,F)_{48}
  - Proshchenkoite-(Y) (Y,REE,Ca,Na,Mn)_{15}Fe^{2+}Ca(P,Si)Si_{6}B_{3}(O,F)_{48}

===== "Garnet" supergroup =====
- Nesosilicate insular SiO_{4} groups only with cations in [6] and >[6] coordination
- Garnet group, X_{3}Z_{2}(TO_{4})_{3} (X = Ca, Fe, etc., Z = Al, Cr, etc., T = Si, As, V, etc.)
  - Pyralspite series
    - Pyrope Mg_{3}Al_{2}(SiO_{4})_{3}, Almandine (Fe^{2+})_{3}Al_{2}(SiO_{4})_{3}, Spessartine (Mn^{2+})_{3}Al_{2}(SiO_{4})_{3}, Knorringite Mg_{3}Cr_{2}(SiO_{4})_{3}, Majorite Mg_{3}(Fe,Al,Si)_{2}(SiO_{4})_{3}, Calderite (Mn^{2+},Ca)_{3}(Fe^{3+},Al)_{2}(SiO_{4})_{3}
  - Ugrandite series
    - Andradite Ca_{3}(Fe^{3+})_{2}(SiO_{4})_{3}, Grossular Ca_{3}Al_{2}(SiO_{4})_{3}, Uvarovite Ca_{3}Cr_{2}(SiO_{4})_{3}, Goldmanite Ca_{3}(V,Al,Fe^{3+})_{2}(SiO_{4})_{3}, Yamatoite? (Mn^{2+},Ca)_{3}(V^{3+},Al)_{2}(SiO_{4})_{3}
  - Schorlomite – Kimzeyite series
    - Schorlomite Ca_{3}(Ti,Fe^{3+},Al)_{2}[(Si,Fe^{3+},Fe^{2+})O_{4}]_{3}, Kimzeyite Ca_{3}(Zr,Ti)_{2}(Si,Al,Fe^{3+})_{3}O_{12}, Morimotoite Ca_{3}TiFe^{2+}Si_{3}O_{12}
  - Hydrogarnet
    - Hibschite Ca_{3}Al_{2}(SiO_{4})_{3−x}(OH)_{4x} (x=0.2 to 1.5), Katoite Ca_{3}Al_{2}(SiO_{4})_{3−x}(OH)_{4x} (x=1.5 to 3)
  - Tetragonal hydrogarnet
    - Henritermierite Ca_{3}(Mn,Al)_{2}(SiO_{4})_{2}(OH)_{4}, Holtstamite Ca_{3}(Al,Mn^{3+})_{2}(SiO_{4})_{2}(OH)_{4}
- Bredigite Ca_{7}Mg(SiO_{4})_{4}, Merwinite Ca_{3}Mg(SiO_{4})_{2}, Wadalite Ca_{6}Al_{5}Si_{2}O_{16}Cl_{3}, Rondorfite Ca_{8}Mg(SiO_{4})_{4}Cl_{2}

===== "Humite" supergroup =====
- Nesosilicate insular SiO_{4} groups and O, OH, F, and H_{2}O with cations in [6] coordination only
- Topaz group
  - Topaz Al_{2}SiO_{4}(F,OH)_{2}, Krieselite (Al,Ga)_{2}(Ge,C)O_{4}(OH)_{2}
- Humite, general formula A_{n}(SiO_{4})_{m}(F,OH)_{2}
  - Chondrodite series
    - Alleghanyite (Mn^{2+})_{5}(SiO_{4})_{2}(OH,F)_{2}, Chondrodite (Mg,Fe,Ti)_{5}(SiO_{4})_{2}(F,OH,O)_{2}, Reinhardbraunsite Ca_{5}(SiO_{4})_{2}(OH,F)_{2}, Ribbeite Mn_{5}(SiO_{4})_{2}(OH)_{2}, Kumtyubeite Ca_{5}(SiO_{4})_{2}F_{2}
  - Humite series
    - Humite (Mg,Fe^{2+})_{7}(SiO_{4})_{3}(F,OH)_{2}, Leucophoenicite (Mn,Ca,Mg,Zn)(SiO_{4})_{3}(OH)_{2}, Manganhumite (Mn,Mg)_{7}(SiO_{4})_{3}(OH)_{2}, Chegemite Ca_{7}(SiO_{4})_{3}(OH)_{2}
  - Clinohumite series
    - Clinohumite (Mg,Fe^{2+})_{9}(SiO_{4})_{4}(F,OH)_{2}, Jerrygibbsite (Mn,Zn)_{9}(SiO_{4})_{4}(OH)_{2}, Sonolite Mn_{9}(SiO_{4})_{4}(F,OH)_{2}, Hydroxylclinohumite Mg_{9}(SiO_{4})_{4}[(OH,F)_{2}
  - Norbergite Mg_{3}(SiO_{4})(F,OH)_{2}
- Chloritoid group
  - Chloritoid (Fe^{2+},Mg,Mn)_{2}Al_{4}Si_{2}O_{10}(OH)_{4}, Magnesiochloritoid MgAl_{2}SiO_{5}(OH)_{2}, Ottrelite (Mn,Fe^{2+},Mg)_{2}Al_{4}Si_{2}O_{10}(OH)_{4}, Carboirite-VIII Fe^{2+}(Al,Ge)_{2}O[(Ge,Si)O_{4}](OH)_{2}

==== Subclass '9.B': sorosilicates ====
- Epidote supergroup, {A_{2}}{M_{3}}(Si_{2}O_{7})(SiO_{4})O(OH)
  - Epidote group
    - Clinozoisite Ca_{2}Al_{3}(SiO_{4})_{3}(OH)=Ca_{2}AlAl_{2}(SiO_{4})(Si_{2}O_{7})O(OH), Niigataite CaSrAl_{3}(Si_{2}O_{7})(SiO_{4})O(OH), Epidote Ca_{2}Fe^{3+}Al_{2}(Si_{2}O_{7})(SiO_{4})O(OH), Hancockite CaPb(Al_{2}Fe^{3+})(Si_{2}O_{7})(SiO_{4})O(OH), Mukhinite Ca_{2}Al_{2}V^{3+}(Si_{2}O_{7})(SiO_{4})O(OH), Piemontite Ca_{2}Mn^{3+}Al_{2}(Si_{2}O_{7})(SiO_{4})O(OH), Piemontite-(Sr) CaSrMn^{3+}Al_{2}(Si_{2}O_{7})(SiO_{4})O(OH), Tweddillite CaSrMn^{3+}_{2}Al(Si_{2}O_{7})(SiO_{4})O(OH)
  - Allanite group
    - Allanite-(Ce) CaCeAl_{2}Fe^{2+}(Si_{2}O_{7})(SiO_{4})O(OH), Allanite-(La) CaLaFe^{2+}Al_{2}(Si_{2}O_{7})(SiO_{4})O(OH), Allanite-(Y) CaYAl_{2}Fe^{2+}(Si_{2}O_{7})(SiO_{4})O(OH), Dissakisite-(Ce) CaCeMgAl_{2}(Si_{2}O_{7})(SiO_{4})O(OH), Dissakisite-(La) CaLaMgAl_{2}(Si_{2}O_{7})(SiO_{4})O(OH), Ferriallanite-(Ce) CaCe^{3+}Fe^{2+}Fe^{3+}Al(SiO_{4})(Si_{2}O_{7})O(OH), Manganiandrosite-(Ce) (Mn^{2+},Ca)(Ce,REE)AlMn^{3+}Mn^{2+}(Si_{2}O_{7})(SiO_{4})O(OH), Manganiandrosite-(La) Mn^{2+}La^{3+}AlMn^{3+}Mn^{2+}(Si_{2}O_{7})(SiO_{4})O(OH), Vanadoandrosite-(Ce) Mn^{2+}Ce^{3+}V^{3+}AlMn^{2+}O(Si_{2}O_{7})(SiO_{4})(OH)
  - Dollaseite group
    - Dollaseite-(Ce) CaCeMg_{2}Al(Si_{2}O_{7})(SiO_{4})(OH)F, Khristovite-(Ce) CaCe^{3+}(MgAlMn^{2+})(Si_{2}O_{7})(SiO_{4})F(OH), Mills et al. (2009)

==== Subclass '9.C': cyclosilicates ====
- Tourmaline group
  - Alkali-Deficient Tourmaline subgroup - Foitite subgroup
    - Foitite ☐[(Fe^{2+})_{2}(Al,Fe^{3+})][Al_{6}][(OH)_{3}|OH|(BO_{3})_{3}|Si_{6}O_{18}], Magnesiofoitite ☐[Mg_{2}(Al,Fe^{3+})][Al_{6}][(OH)_{3}|OH|(BO_{3})_{3}|Si_{6}O_{18}], Rossmanite ☐[LiAl_{2}][Al_{6}][(OH)_{3}|OH|(BO_{3})_{3}|Si_{6}O_{18}], Oxy-Rossmanite ☐[LiAl_{2}]Al_{6}(OH)_{3}O(BO_{3})_{3}[Si_{6}O_{18}]
  - Calcic Tourmaline subgroup - Liddicoatite subgroup
    - Liddicoatite [Ca][Li_{2}Al][Al_{6}][(OH)_{3}|F|(BO_{3})_{3}|Si_{6}O_{18}], Uvite CaMg_{3}(Al_{5}Mg)(Si_{6}O_{18})(BO_{3})_{3}(OH)_{4}, Feruvite [Ca][(Fe^{2+},Mg)_{3}][MgAl_{5}][(OH)_{3}|F|(BO_{3})_{3}|Si_{6}O_{18}], Hydroxyuvite (IMA2000-030 was not approved, but suspended) CaMg_{3}(Al_{5}Mg)(Si_{6}O_{18})(BO_{3})_{3}(OH)_{3}(OH)
  - Ferric Tourmaline subgroup - Buergerite subgroup
    - Buergerite [Na][(Fe^{3+})_{3}][Al_{6}][O_{3}|F|(BO_{3})_{3}|Si_{6}O_{18}], Povondraite [Na][(Fe^{3+})_{3}][(Fe^{3+})_{4}Mg_{2}][(OH)_{3}|O|(BO_{3})_{3}|Si_{6}O_{18}]
  - Lithian Tourmaline subgroup - Elbaite subgroup
    - Olenite NaAl_{9}B_{3}Si_{6}O_{27}O_{3}OH, Oxy-Dravite Na(MgAl_{2})(MgAl_{5})Si_{6}O_{18}(BO_{3})_{3}(OH)_{3}O, Elbaite Na(Al_{1.5}Li_{1.5})Al_{6}(OH)_{3}(OH)(BO_{3})_{3}Si_{6}O_{18}
  - Sodic Tourmaline subgroup - Schorl subgroup
    - Dravite [Na][Mg_{3}][Al_{6}][(OH)_{3}|OH|(BO_{3})_{3}|Si_{6}O_{18}], Fluor-Dravite NaMg_{3}Al_{6}(OH)_{3}F(BO_{3})_{3}(Si_{6}O_{18}), Schorl [Na][(Fe^{2+})_{3}][Al_{6}][(OH)_{3}|OH|(BO_{3})_{3}|Si_{6}O_{18}], Schorl-(F) [Na][(Fe^{2+})_{3}][Al_{6}][(OH)_{3}|F,OH|(BO_{3})_{3}|Si_{6}O_{18}], Chromdravite [Na][Mg_{3}][(Cr^{3+},Fe^{3+})_{6}][(OH)_{3}|OH|(BO_{3})_{3}|Si_{6}O_{18}], Vanadiumdravite [Na][Mg_{3}][(V^{3+})_{6}][(OH)_{3}|OH|(BO_{3})_{3}|Si_{6}O_{18}]
- Eudialyte group
  - Carbokentbrooksite (Na,☐)_{12}(Na,Ce)_{3}Ca_{6}Mn_{3}Zr_{3}Nb(Si_{25}O_{73})(OH)_{3}(CO_{3})•H_{2}O
  - Eudialyte Na_{4}(Ca,Ce)_{2}(Fe^{2+},Mn,Y)ZrSi_{8}O_{22}(OH,Cl)_{2} (?)
  - Feklichevite Na_{11}Ca_{9}(Fe^{3+},Fe^{2+})_{2}Zr_{3}Nb[Si_{25}O_{73}](OH,H_{2}O,Cl,O)_{5}
  - Ferrokentbrooksite Na_{15}Ca_{6}(Fe,Mn)_{3}Zr_{3}NbSi_{25}O_{73}(O,OH,H_{2}O)_{3}(Cl,F,OH)_{2}
  - Georgbarsanovite Na_{12}(Mn,Sr,REE)_{3}Ca_{6}(Fe^{2+})_{3}Zr_{3}NbSi_{25}O_{76}Cl_{2}•H_{2}O
  - Golyshevite (Na,Ca)_{10}Ca_{9}(Fe^{3+},Fe^{2+})_{2}Zr_{3}NbSi_{25}O_{72}(CO_{3})(OH)_{3}•H_{2}O
  - Ikranite (Na,H_{3}O)_{15}(Ca,Mn,REE)_{6}(Fe^{3+})_{2}Zr_{3}(☐,Zr)(☐,Si)Si_{24}O_{66}(O,OH)_{6}Cl•2-3H_{2}O
  - Johnsenite-(Ce) Na_{12}(Ce,REE,Sr)_{3}Ca_{6}Mn_{3}Zr_{3}W(Si_{25}O_{73})(CO_{3})(OH,Cl)_{2}
  - Kentbrooksite (Na,REE)_{15}(Ca,REE)_{6}Mn^{2+}Zr_{3}NbSi_{25}O_{74}F_{2}•2H_{2}O
  - Khomyakovite Na_{12}Sr_{3}Ca_{6}Fe_{3}Zr_{3}W(Si_{25}O_{73})(O,OH,H_{2}O)_{3}(OH,Cl)_{2}
  - Manganokhomyakovite Na_{12}Sr_{3}Ca_{6}Mn_{3}Zr_{3}W(Si_{25}O_{73})(O,OH,H_{2}O)_{3}(OH,Cl)_{2}
  - Mogovidite Na_{9}(Ca,Na)_{6}Ca_{6}Fe_{2}Zr_{3}☐Si_{25}O_{72}(CO_{3})(OH)_{4}
  - Oneillite Na_{15}Ca_{3}Mn_{3}(Fe^{2+})_{3}Zr_{3}Nb(Si_{25}O_{73})(O,OH,H_{2}O)_{3}(OH,Cl)_{2}
  - Raslakite Na_{15}Ca_{3}Fe_{3}(Na,Zr)_{3}Zr_{3}(Si,Nb)(Si_{25}O_{73})(OH,H_{2}O)_{3}(Cl,OH)
  - Rastsvetaevite Na_{27}K_{8}Ca_{12}Fe_{3}Zr_{6}Si_{52}O_{144}(O,OH,H_{2}O)_{6}Cl_{2}
  - Taseqite Na_{12}Sr_{3}Ca_{6}Fe_{3}Zr_{3}NbSi_{25}O_{73}(O,OH,H_{2}O)_{3}Cl_{2}
  - Zirsilite-(Ce) (Na,☐)_{12}(Ce, Na)_{3}Ca_{6}Mn_{3}Zr_{3}Nb(Si_{25}O_{73})(OH)_{3}(CO_{3})•H_{2}O
  - Alluaivite Na_{19}(Ca,Mn^{2+})_{6}(Ti,Nb)_{3}(Si_{3}O_{9})_{2}(Si_{10}O_{28})_{2}Cl•2H_{2}O
  - Andrianovite Na_{12}(K,Sr,Ce)_{3}Ca_{6}Mn_{3}Zr_{3}Nb(Si_{25}O_{73})(O,H_{2}O,OH)_{5}
  - Aqualite (H_{3}O)_{8}(Na,K,Sr)_{5}Ca_{6}Zr_{3}Si_{26}O_{66}(OH)_{9}Cl
  - Dualite Na_{30}(Ca,Na,Ce,Sr)_{12}(Na,Mn,Fe,Ti)_{6}Zr_{3}Ti_{3}MnSi_{51}O_{144}(OH,H_{2}O,Cl)_{9}
  - Labyrinthite (Na,K,Sr)_{35}Ca_{12}Fe_{3}Zr_{6}TiSi_{51}O_{144}(O,OH,H_{2}O)_{9}Cl_{3}, Mills et al. (2009)

==== Subclass '9.D': inosilicates ====
===== Single chain inosilicates =====
- Astrophyllite group
  - Astrophyllite K_{2}Na(Fe^{2+},Mn)_{7}Ti_{2}Si_{8}O_{26}(OH)_{4}
  - Magnesioastrophyllite K_{2}Na[Na(Fe^{2+},Fe^{3+},Mn)Mg_{2}]Ti_{2}Si_{8}O_{26}(OH)_{4}F
  - Hydroastrophyllite (H_{3}O,K)_{2}Ca(Fe^{3+},Mn)_{5-6}Ti_{2}Si_{8}O_{26}(OH)_{4}F
  - Niobophyllite K_{2}Na(Fe^{2+},Mn)_{7}(Nb,Ti)_{2}Si_{8}O_{26}(OH)_{4}(F,O)
  - Zircophyllite K_{2}(Na,Ca)(Mn,Fe^{2+})_{7}(Zr,Nb)_{2}Si_{8}O_{26}(OH)_{4}F
  - Kupletskite K_{2}Na(Mn,Fe^{2+})_{7}(Ti,Nb)_{2}Si_{8}O_{26}(OH)_{4}F
  - Kupletskite-(Cs) (Cs,K)_{2}Na(Mn,Fe^{2+},Li)_{7}(Ti,Nb)_{2}Si_{8}O_{26}(OH)_{4}F
  - Niobokupletskite K_{2}Na(Mn,Zn,Fe)_{7}(Nb,Zr,Ti)_{2}Si_{8}O_{26}(OH)_{4}(O,F), Mills et al. (2009)
- Sapphirine supergroup
  - Sapphirine group
    - Khmaralite (Mg,Al,Fe)_{16}(Al,Si,Be)_{12}O_{40}, Sapphirine (Mg,Al)_{8}(Al,Si)_{6}O_{20}
  - Aenigmatite group
    - Aenigmatite (Na,Ca)_{4}(Fe^{2+},Ti,Mg)_{12}Si_{12}O_{40}, Krinovite NaMg_{2}CrSi_{3}O_{10}, Wilkinsonite Na_{2}(Fe^{2+})_{4}(Fe^{3+})_{2}Si_{6}O_{20}
  - Rhoenite group
    - Dorrite Ca_{2}Mg_{2}(Fe^{3+})_{4}(Al,Fe^{3+})_{4}Si_{2}O_{20}, Hogtuvaite (Ca,Na)2(Fe^{2+},Fe^{3+},Ti,Mg,Mn)_{6}(Si,Be,Al)_{6}O_{20}, Makarochkinite Ca_{2}(Fe^{2+})_{4}Fe^{3+}TiSi_{4}BeAlO_{20}, Rhonite Ca_{2}(Mg,Fe^{2+},Fe^{3+},Ti)_{6}(Si,Al)_{6}O_{20}, Serendibite Ca_{2}(Mg,Al)_{6}(Si,Al,B)_{6}O_{20}, Welshite Ca_{4}Mg_{9}Sb_{3}O_{4}[Si_{6}Be_{3}AlFe_{2}O_{36}]
  - Surinamite (Mg,Fe^{2+})_{3}Al_{4}BeSi_{3}O_{16}, Mills et al. (2009)

====== Pyroxene supergroup ======
Pyroxene Quadrilateral

- Orthopyroxene group
  - Donpeacorite (Mn^{2+},Mg)Mg[SiO_{3}]_{2}, Enstatite MgSiO_{3}, Ferrosilite, FeSiO_{3}
- Clinopyroxene group
  - Aegirine NaFe^{3+}Si_{2}O_{6}, Augite (Ca,Na)(Mg,Fe^{2+},Al,Fe^{3+},Ti)[(Si,Al)_{2}O_{6}], Clinoenstatite MgSiO_{3}, Clinoferrosilite Fe^{2+}SiO_{3}, Diopside CaMg[Si_{2}O_{6}], Esseneite CaFe^{3+}[AlSiO_{6}], Grossmanite CaTi^{3+}AlSiO_{6}, Hedenbergite CaFe^{2+}[Si_{2}O_{6}], Jadeite Na(Al,Fe^{3+})[Si_{2}O_{6}], Jervisite (Na,Ca,Fe^{2+})(Sc,Mg,Fe^{2+})[Si_{2}O_{6}], Johannsenite CaMn^{2+}[Si_{2}O_{6}], Kanoite Mn^{2+}(Mg,Mn^{2+})[Si_{2}O_{6}], Kosmochlor NaCr[Si_{2}O_{6}], Kushiroite CaAl[Si_{2}O_{6}], Namansilite NaMn3+[Si_{2}O_{6}], Natalyite Na(V^{3+},Cr)[Si_{2}O_{6}], Petedunnite Ca(Zn,Mn^{2+},Mg,Fe^{2+})[Si_{2}O_{6}], Pigeonite (Mg,Fe^{2+},Ca)(Mg,Fe^{2+})Si_{2}O_{6}, Spodumene LiAlSi_{2}O_{6}

===== Multiple chain inosilicates =====
Note: the amphibole subcommittee (CNMNC/ IMA) published many reports (IMA 1978 s.p., IMA 1997 s.p., IMA 2003 s.p., IMA 2012 s.p.), renaming and redefining many minerals. Working draft: rruff.info, mindat.org and mineralienatlas.de are not up to date yet.

====== Amphibole supergroup ======
- w(OH, F, Cl)-dominant amphibole: calcic subgroup
  - Cannilloite root name: fluoro-cannilloite CaCa_{2}Mg_{4}Al(Si_{5}Al_{3})O_{22}(OH)_{2} (1993-033, IMA 1997 s.p. Rd, IMA 2012 s.p. Rd Rn from cannilloite)
  - Edenite root name: edenite Na[Ca_{2}][Mg_{5}][(OH)_{2}|AlSi_{7}O_{22}] (1839, IMA 2012 s.p. Rd), ferro-edenite [Na][Ca_{2}][(Fe^{2+})_{5}][(OH)_{2}|AlSi_{7}O_{22}] (1946, IMA 1997 s.p. Rd, IMA 2012 s.p. Rd), fluoro-edenite Na[Ca_{2}][Mg_{5}][(F,OH)_{2}|AlSi_{7}O_{22}] (IMA 1994-059, IMA 2012 s.p. Rd)
  - Hastingsite root name: hastingsite [Na][Ca_{2}][(Fe^{2+})_{4}Fe^{3+}][(OH)_{2}|Al_{2}Si_{6}O_{22}] (1896, IMA 2012 s.p. Rd), magnesio-fluoro-hastingsite (Na,K)Ca_{2}(Mg,Fe^{3+},Ti)_{5}(Si,Al)_{8}O_{22}F_{2} (IMA 2005-002, IMA 2012 s.p. Rd Rn from fluoro-magnesiohastingsite), magnesio-hastingsite Na[Ca_{2}][Mg_{4}Fe^{3+}][(OH)_{2}|Al_{2}Si_{6}O_{22}] (1928, IMA 1997 s.p. Rd, IMA 2012 s.p. Rd Rn from magnesiohastingsite), potassic-fluoro-hastingsite KCa2((Fe^{2+})_{2},Mg_{2},Fe^{3+})S_{5}(Si_{6}Al_{2})_{8}O_{22}F_{2} (IMA 2005-006, IMA 2012 s.p. Rd Rn from fluoro-potassichastingsite), potassic-chloro-hastingsite KCa_{2}(Mg_{4}Al)(Si_{6}Al_{2})O_{22}Cl_{2} (IMA 2005-007, IMA 2012 s.p. Rd Rn from chloro-potassicpargasite, syn. dashkesanite), potassic-magnesio-hastingsite (K,Na)Ca_{2}(Mg,Fe^{2+},Fe^{3+},Al)_{5}(Si,Al)_{8}O_{22}(OH,Cl)_{2} (IMA 2004-027b, IMA 2012 s.p. Rd Rn from potassic-magnesiohastingsite)
  - Joesmithite PbCa_{2}(Mg,Fe^{2+},Fe^{3+})_{5}Si_{6}Be_{2}O_{22}(OH)_{2} (1968, IMA 2012 s.p. Rd)
  - Magnesio-hornblende root name: ferro-hornblende [Ca_{2}][(Fe^{2+})_{4}Al][(OH)_{2}|AlSi_{7}O_{22}] (1930, IMA 1978 s.p., IMA 1997 s.p. Rn from ferro-hornblende, IMA 2012 s.p. Rd Rn from ferrohornblende), magnesio-hornblende [Ca_{2}][Mg_{4}Al][(OH)_{2}|AlSi_{7}O_{22}] (1965, IMA 1997 s.p. Rd, IMA 2012 s.p. Rd Rn from magnesiohornblende)
  - Pargasite root name: chromio-pargasite (IMA 2011-023, IMA 2012 s.p. Rd Rn from ehimeite), ferro-pargasite [Na][Ca_{2}][(Fe^{2+})_{4}Al][(OH)_{2}|Al_{2}Si_{6}O_{22}] (1961, IMA 1997 s.p. Rd, IMA 2012 s.p. Rd Rn from ferropargasite), fluoro-pargasite NaCa_{2}(Mg_{3}Fe^{2+}Al)_{5}(Si_{6}Al_{2}O_{22})F_{2} (IMA 2003-050, IMA 2012 s.p. Rd Rn from fluoropargasite), pargasite [Na][Ca_{2}][Mg_{4}Al][(OH)_{2}|Al_{2}Si_{6}O_{22}] (1815, IMA 1997 s.p. Rd, IMA 2012 s.p. Rd), potassic-chloro-pargasite KCa_{2}((Fe^{2+})_{3}MgFe^{3+})(Si_{6}Al_{2})S_{8}O_{22}Cl_{2} (IMA 2001-036, IMA 2012 s.p. Rd Rn from chloro-potassichastingsite), potassic-ferro-pargasite KCa_{2}((Fe^{2+})_{4}Al)Si_{6}Al_{2}O_{22}(OH)_{2} (IMA 2007-053, IMA 2012 s.p. Rd Rn from potassic-ferropargasite), potassic-fluoro-pargasite (IMA 2009-091, IMA 2012 s.p. Rd Rn from fluoro-potassic-pargasite), potassic-pargasite [K][Ca_{2}][Mg_{4}Al][(OH)_{2}|Al_{2}Si_{6}O_{22}] (IMA 1994-046, IMA 2012 s.p. Rd Rn from potassicpargasite)
  - Sadanagaite root name: potassic-ferro-ferri-sadanagaite [K][Ca_{2}][(Fe^{2+})_{3}(Fe^{3+})_{2}][(OH)_{2}|Al_{3}Si_{5}O_{22}] (IMA 1997-035, IMA 2012 s.p. Rd Rn from potassic-ferrisadanagaite), potassic-ferro-sadanagaite KCa_{2}Fe^{2+}_{3}(Al,Fe^{3+})_{2}(Si_{5}Al_{3})O_{22}(OH)_{2} (IMA 1980-027, 2004 Rd, IMA 1997 s.p. Rd Rn from sadanagaite, IMA 2012 s.p. Rd Rn from potassicsadanagaite), potassic-sadanagaite (K,Na)Ca_{2}(Mg,Fe^{2+},Al,Ti)_{5}[(Si,Al)_{8}O_{22}] (IMA 1982-102, 2004 Rd, IMA 2003 s.p. Rn from magnesio-sadanagaite, IMA 2012 s.p. Rd Rn from potassic-magnesiosadanagaite), sadanagaite [Na][Ca_{2}][Mg_{3}Al_{2}][(OH)_{2}|Al_{3}Si_{5}O_{22}] (1984, IMA 1997 s.p. Rd Rn from sadanagaite, IMA 2002-051, 2004 Rn from potassic-magnesiosadanagaite, IMA 2012 s.p. Rd Rn from magnesiosadanagaite)
  - Tremolite-actinolite root name: actinolite Ca_{2}(Mg,Fe^{2+})_{5}(Si_{8}O_{22})(OH)_{2} (1794, IMA 2012 s.p. Rd), ferro-actinolite [Ca_{2}][(Fe^{2+},Mg)_{5}][(OH)_{2}|Si_{8}O_{22}] (1946, IMA 1997 s.p. Rd, IMA 2012 s.p. Rd), tremolite [Ca_{2}][Mg_{5}][(OH)_{2}|Si_{8}O_{22}] (1789, IMA 1997 s.p. Rd, IMA 2012 s.p. Rd)
  - Tschermakite root name: tschermakite [Ca_{2}][Mg_{3}Fe^{3+}Al][(OH)_{2}|Al_{2}Si_{6}O_{22}] (1945, IMA 1997 s.p. Rd, IMA 2012 s.p. Rd)
- w(OH, F, Cl)-dominant amphibole: lithium subgroup
  - Clino-holmquistite root name: clino-ferro-ferri-holmquistite ☐Li_{2}((Fe^{3+})_{2}(Fe^{2+})_{3})Si_{8}O_{22}(OH)_{2} (IMA 1997 s.p., 2001-066, IMA 2012 s.p. Rd Rn from ferri-clinoferroholmquistite)
  - Holmquistite root name: ferro-holmquistite ☐(Li_{2}(Fe^{2+})_{3}Al_{2})Si_{8}O_{22}(OH)_{2} (IMA 2004-030, IMA 2012 s.p. Rd), holmquistite ☐(Li_{2}Mg_{3}Al_{2})Si_{8}O_{22}(OH)_{2} (1913, IMA 1997 s.p. Rd, IMA 2012 s.p. Rd)
  - Pedrizite root name: ferri-pedrizite NaLi_{2}((Fe^{3+})_{2}Mg_{2}Li)Si_{8}O_{22}(OH)_{2} (IMA 2001-032, IMA 2003 s.p. discredited, IMA 2012 s.p. Rd revalidated), ferro-ferri-pedrizite NaLi_{2}((Fe^{3+})_{2}(Fe^{2+})_{3})Si_{8}O_{22}(OH)_{2} (IMA 2003 s.p., IMA 2012 s.p. Rd Rn from sodic-ferro-ferripedrizite), ferro-fluoro-pedrizite NaLi_{2}(Fe^{2+})_{2}Al_{2}Li)Si_{8}O_{22}F_{2} (IMA 2008-070, IMA 2012 s.p. Rd Rn from fluoro-sodic-ferropedrizite), fluoro-pedrizite NaLi_{2}(Mg_{2}Al_{2}Li)Si_{8}O_{22}F_{2} (IMA 2004-002, IMA 2012 s.p. Rd Rn from fluoro-sodic-pedrizite)
- w(OH, F, Cl)-dominant amphibole: Mg-Fe-Mn subgroup
  - Anthophyllite root name: anthophyllite ☐Mg_{7}Si_{8}O_{22}(OH)_{2} (1801, IMA 2012 s.p. Rd), ferro-anthophyllite ☐(Fe^{2+})_{7}Si_{8}O_{22}(OH)_{2} (1821, IMA 1997 s.p. Rd, IMA 2012 s.p. Rd), proto-anthophyllite (Mg,Fe)_{7}Si_{8}O_{22}(OH)_{2} (IMA 2001-065, IMA 2012 s.p. Rd), protoferro-anthophyllite (Fe^{2+},Mn^{2+})_{2}(Fe^{2+},Mg)_{5}(Si_{4}O_{11})_{2}(OH)_{2} (IMA 1986-006, IMA 2012 s.p. Rd), protomangano-ferro-anthophyllite (Mn^{2}+,Fe^{2}+)_{2}(Fe^{2+},Mg)_{5}(Si_{4}O_{11})_{2}(OH)_{2} (IMA 1986-007, IMA 2012 s.p. Rd)
  - Gedrite root name: ferro-gedrite ☐(Fe^{2+})_{5}Al_{2}Si_{6}Al_{2}O_{22}(OH)_{2} (1939, IMA 1978 s.p. Rn, IMA 1997 s.p. Rd, IMA 2012 s.p. Rd Rn from ferrogedrite), gedrite ☐Mg_{5}Al_{2}Si_{6}Al_{2}O_{22}(OH)_{2} (1836, IMA 2012 s.p. Rd)
  - Minerals: cummingtonite ☐Mg_{7}Si_{8}O_{22}(OH)_{2} (1824, IMA 1997 s.p. Rd, IMA 2012 s.p. Rd), grunerite ☐(Fe^{2+})_{7}Si_{8}O_{22}(OH)_{2} (1853, IMA 1997 s.p. Rd, IMA 2012 s.p. Rd)
- w(OH, F, Cl)-dominant amphibole: sodic subgroup
  - Arfvedsonite root name: arfvedsonite NaNa_{2}((Fe^{2+})_{4}Fe^{3+})Si_{8}O_{22}(OH)_{2} (1823, IMA 2012 s.p. Rd), magnesio-arfvedsonite NaNa_{2}(Mg_{4}Fe^{2+})Si_{8}O_{22}(OH)_{2} (1957, IMA 2012 s.p. Rd), magnesio-fluoro-arfvedsonite NaNa_{2}(Mg,Fe^{2+})_{4}Fe^{3+}[Si_{8}O_{22}](F,OH)_{2} (IMA 1998-056, IMA 2012 s.p. Rd Rn from fluoro-magnesio-arfvedsonite), potassic-arfvedsonite KNa_{2}(Fe^{2+})_{4}Fe^{3+}Si_{8}O_{22}(OH)_{2} (IMA 2003-043, IMA 2012 s.p. Rd), potassic-magnesio-fluoro-arfvedsonite KNa_{2}(Mg_{4}Fe^{3+})Si_{8}O_{22}F_{2} (IMA 1985-023, 2006 Rn from potassium fluor-magnesio-arfvedsonite, 2010 Rd, IMA 2012 s.p. Rd Rn from fluoro-potassic-magnesio-arfvedsonite)
  - Eckermannite root name: eckermannite NaNa_{2}(Mg_{4}Al)Si_{8}O_{22}(OH)_{2} (1942, IMA 2012 s.p. Rd), mangano-ferri-eckermannite NaNa_{2}(Mn^{2+})_{4}(Fe^{3+},Al)Si_{8}O_{22}(OH)_{2} (1968-028, IMA 1997 s.p., IMA 2012 s.p. Rd Rn from kôzulite)
  - Glaucophane root name: ferro-glaucophane ☐Na_{2}((Fe^{2+})_{3}Al_{2})Si_{8}O_{22}(OH)_{2} (1957, IMA 1997 s.p. Rd, IMA 2012 s.p. Rd Rn from ferroglaucophane), glaucophane ☐Na_{2}(Mg_{3}Al_{2})Si_{8}O_{22}(OH)_{2} (1963, IMA 1997 s.p. Rd, IMA 2012 s.p. Rd)
  - Leakeite root name: ferri-fluoro-leakeite NaNa_{2}(Mg_{2}Fe^{3+}_{2}Li)Si_{8}O_{22}F_{2} (IMA 2009-085, IMA 2012 s.p. Rd Rn from fluoroleakeite), ferri-leakeite Na(NaLi)(Mg_{2}(Fe^{3+})_{2}Li)Si_{8}O_{22}(OH)_{2} (IMA 2001-069, IMA 2012 s.p. Rd Rn from ferriwhittakerite), ferro-ferri-fluoro-leakeite NaNa_{2}((Fe^{2+})_{2}(Fe^{3+})_{2}Li)Si_{8}O_{22}F_{2} (IMA 1993-026, IMA 2012 s.p. Rd Rn from fluoro-ferroleakeite), fluoro-leakeite NaNa_{2}(Mg_{2}Al_{2}Li)Si_{8}O_{22}F_{2} (IMA 2009-012, IMA 2012 s.p. Rd Rn from fluoro-aluminoleakeite), potassic-ferri-leakeite KNa_{2}Mg_{2}(Fe^{3+})_{2}LiSi_{8}O_{22}(OH)_{2} (IMA 2001-049, IMA 2012 s.p. Rd Rn from potassicleakeite), potassic-leakeite KNa_{2}(Mg_{2}Al_{2}Li)Si_{8}O_{22}(OH)_{2} (2002, IMA 2012 s.p. Rd), potassic-mangani-leakeite KNa_{2}(Mg_{2}Mn^{3+}_{2}Li)Si_{8}O_{22}(OH)_{2} (IMA 1992-032, IMA 2012 s.p. Rd Rn from kornite)
  - Nybøite root name: ferro-ferri-nybøite NaNa_{2}(Fe^{2+})_{3}(Fe^{3+})_{2}(Si_{7}Al)O_{22}(OH)_{2} (IMA 1997 s.p., IMA 2012 s.p. Rd Rn from ferric-ferronyboite), fluoro-nybøite NaNa_{2}(Al_{2}Mg_{3})(Si_{7}Al)O_{22}(F,OH)_{2} (IMA 2002-010, IMA 2012 s.p. Rd Rn from fluoronybøite), nybøite NaNa_{2}(Mg_{3}Al_{2})Si_{7}AlO_{22}(OH)_{2} (1981, IMA 1997 s.p. Rd, IMA 2012 s.p. Rd)
  - Riebeckite root name: fluoro-riebeckite ☐Na_{2}(Fe^{2+}_{3}Fe^{3+}_{2})Si_{8}O_{22}F_{2} (1966, IMA 2012 s.p. Rd), magnesio-riebeckite ☐Na_{2}[(Mg,Fe^{2+})_{3}(Fe^{3+})_{2}]Si_{8}O_{22}(OH)_{2} (1957, IMA 1997 s.p. Rd, IMA 2012 s.p. Rd), riebeckite ☐Na_{2}((Fe^{2+})_{3}(Fe^{3+})_{2})Si_{8}O_{22}(OH)_{2} (1888, IMA 1997 s.p. Rd, IMA 2012 s.p. Rd)
- w(OH, F, Cl)-dominant amphibole: sodic-calcic subgroup
  - Barroisite root name: barroisite [CaNa][Mg_{3}AlFe^{3+}][(OH)_{2}|AlSi_{7}O_{22}] (1922, IMA 1997 s.p. Rd, IMA 2012 s.p. Rd)
  - Katophorite root name: ferri-fluoro-katophorite Na(NaCa)(Mg_{4}Fe^{3+})(Si_{7}Al)O_{22}F_{2} (IMA 2012 s.p.), ferri-katophorite Na_{2}Ca(Fe^{2+},Mg)_{4}Fe^{3+}(Si_{7}Al)O_{22}(OH)_{2} (IMA 1978 s.p., IMA 2012 s.p. Rd Rn from ferrikatophorite), ferro-katophorite Na(NaCa)(Fe^{2+}_{4}Al)(Si_{7}Al)O_{22}(OH)_{2} (1894, IMA 2012 s.p. Rd Rn), katophorite Na(NaCa)(Mg_{4}Al)(Si_{7}Al)O_{22}(OH)_{2} (1894, IMA 1997 s.p. Rd, IMA 2012 s.p. Rd)
  - Richterite root name: ferro-richterite Na[CaNa][(Fe^{2+})_{5}][(OH)_{2}|Si_{8}O_{22}] (1946, IMA 1997 s.p. Rd, IMA 2012 s.p. Rd Rn from ferrorichterite), fluoro-richterite Na(CaNa)Mg_{5}[Si_{8}O_{22}]F_{2} (IMA 1992-020, IMA 2012 s.p. Rd Rn from fluororichterite), potassic-fluoro-richterite K[CaNa][Mg_{5}][(F,OH)_{2}|Si_{8}O_{22}] (IMA 1986-046, IMA 2004 s.p. Rn from potassium-fluorrichterite, IMA 2012 s.p. Rd Rn from fluoro-potassicrichterite), richterite Na[CaNa][Mg_{5}][(OH)_{2}|Si_{8}O_{22}] (1865, IMA 1997 s.p. Rd, IMA 2012 s.p. Rd)
  - Taramite root name: ferro-taramite Na[CaNa][(Fe^{2+})_{3}Al_{2}][(OH)_{2}|Al_{2}Si_{6}O_{22}] (IMA 2006-023, IMA 2012 s.p. Rd Rn from aluminotaramite), fluoro-taramite Na_{2}CaMg_{3}Al_{2}(Si_{6}Al_{2})O_{22}F_{2} (IMA 2006-025, IMA 2012 s.p. Rd Rn from fluoro-alumino-magnesiotaramite), potassic-ferro-ferri-taramite K(CaNa)(Fe^{2+}_{3}Fe^{3+}_{2})(Si_{6}Al_{2})O_{22}(OH)_{2} (IMA 1964-003, IMA 1978 s.p. Rn from mboziite, IMA 1997 s.p. Rn from ferri-taramite, IMA 2012 s.p. Rd Rn from ferritaramite, Erratum 2013 Rd Rn from ferro-ferri-taramite), potassic-ferro-taramite K(CaNa)(Fe^{2+}_{3}Al_{2})(Si_{6}Al_{2})O_{22}(OH)_{2} (IMA 2007-015, IMA 2012 s.p. Rd Rn from potassic-aluminotaramite), taramite Na_{2}CaMg_{3}Al_{2}(Si_{6}Al_{2})O_{22}(OH)_{2} (IMA 2006-024, IMA 2012 s.p. Rd Rn from alumino-magnesiotaramite)
  - Winchite root name: ferri-winchite (☐,Na)(Na,Ca)_{2}(Mg,Fe^{2+})_{4}Fe^{3+}[Si_{8}O_{22}](OH)_{2} (IMA 2004-034, IMA 2012 s.p. Rd Rn from ferriwinchite), ferro-winchite [CaNa][(Fe^{2+})_{4}(Al,Fe^{3+})][(OH)_{2}|Si_{8}O_{22}] (IMA 1978 s.p., IMA 1997 s.p. Rd, IMA 2012 s.p. Rd Rn from ferrowinchite), winchite [CaNa][Mg_{4}(Al,Fe^{3+})][(OH)_{2}|Si_{8}O_{22}] (1906, IMA 1997 s.p. Rd, IMA 2012 s.p. Rd)
- w(OH, F, Cl)-dominant amphibole: Na-Mg-Fe-Mn subgroup
  - Ghoseite root name: ferri-ghoseite Na(NaMn^{2+})(Mg_{4}Fe^{3+})Si_{8}O_{22}(OH)_{2} (IMA 2003-066, IMA 2012 s.p. Rd Rn from parvowinchite)
- w(O)-dominant amphibole group
  - Kaersutite root name: ferri-kaersutite NaCa_{2}(Mg_{3}Fe^{3+}Ti)(Si_{6}Al_{2})O_{22}O_{2} (IMA 2011-035, IMA 2012 s.p. Rd Rn from ferrikaersutite), kaersutite NaCa_{2}(Mg_{4}Ti)(Si_{6}Al_{2})O_{23}(OH) (IMA 1997 s.p., IMA 2012 s.p. Rd)
  - Minerals: mangani-dellaventuraite NaNa_{2}(Mg_{2},Mn^{3+},Li,Ti)Si_{8}O_{22}O_{2} (IMA 2003-061, IMA 2012 s.p. Rd Rn from dellaventuraite), mangano-mangani-ungarettiite NaNa_{2}((Mn^{2+})_{2}(Mn^{3+})_{3})Si_{8}O_{22}O_{2} (IMA 1994-004, IMA 2012 s.p. Rd Rn from ungarettiite)

==== Subclass '9.E': phyllosilicates ====
- Category:Clay minerals group
- Category:Medicinal clay
- Category:Mica group
- Category:Serpentine group/ Kaolinite-Serpentine group
- Category:Smectite group/ Montmorillonite group
- Pyrophyllite-Talc group
- Chlorite group: Clinochlore, Nimite, Pennantite, Baileychlore, Cookeite, Donbassite, Gonyerite, Odinite, Sudoite, Orthochamosite

==== Subclass '9.F': tectosilicates ====
===== Tectosilicates without zeolitic H_{2}O =====
- Category:Quartz varieties
- Feldspar family
- Feldspathoid family
  - Sodalite group
  - Helvine group
  - Category:Cancrinite group

===== Tectosilicates with zeolitic H_{2}O =====
- Category:Zeolite group
- Alflarsenite NaCa_{2}Be_{3}Si_{4}O_{13}(OH) · 2 H_{2}O
- Zeolites with T_{5}O_{10} Units – fibrous zeolites
  - Natrolite subgroup
    - Gonnardite (Na,Ca)_{2}(Si,Al)_{5}O_{10} · 3 H_{2}O, Mesolite Na_{2}Ca_{2}Si_{9}Al_{6}O_{30} · 8 H_{2}O, Natrolite Na_{2}Al_{2}Si_{3}O_{10} · 2 H_{2}O, Paranatrolite Na_{2}Al_{2}Si_{3}O_{10} · 3 H_{2}O, Scolecite CaAl_{2}Si_{3}O_{10} · 3 H_{2}O
  - Tetranatrolite? Na_{2}[Al_{2}Si_{3}O_{10}] · 2 H_{2}O, Thomsonite-Sr (Sr,Ca)_{2}Na[Al_{5}Si_{5}O_{20}] · 7 H_{2}O, Thomsonite-Ca NaCa_{2}Al_{5}Si_{5}O_{20} · 6 H_{2}O, Kalborsite K6Al_{4}Si_{6}BO_{20}(OH)_{4}Cl, Edingtonite BaAl_{2}Si_{3}O_{10} · 4 H_{2}O
- Chains of single connected 4-membered rings
  - Ammonioleucite (NH_{4},K)AlSi_{2}O_{6}, Leucite KAlSi_{2}O_{6}, Analcime NaAlSi_{2}O_{6} · H_{2}O, Hsianghualite Ca_{3}Li_{2}Be_{3}(SiO_{4})_{3}F_{2}, Lithosite K_{6}Al_{4}Si_{8}O_{25} · H_{2}O, Pollucite (Cs,Na)_{2}Al_{2}Si_{4}O_{12} · H_{2}O, Wairakite CaAl_{2}Si_{4}O_{12} · 2 H_{2}O, Laumontite CaAl_{2}Si_{4}O_{12} · 4 H_{2}O, Yugawaralite CaAl_{2}Si_{6}O_{16} · 4 H_{2}O, Roggianite Ca_{2}[Be(OH)_{2}Al_{2}Si_{4}O_{13}]•2 · 5 H_{2}O, Goosecreekite CaAl_{2}Si_{6}O_{16} · 5 H_{2}O, Montesommaite (K,Na)_{9}Al_{9}Si_{23}O_{64} · 10 H_{2}O, Partheite Ca_{2}Al_{4}Si_{4}O_{15}(OH)_{2} · 4 H_{2}O
- Chains of doubly connected 4-membered rings
  - Amicite K_{2}Na_{2}Al_{4}Si_{4}O_{16} · 5 H_{2}O, Garronite Na_{2}Ca_{5}Al_{12}Si_{20}O_{64} · 27 H_{2}O, Gobbinsite (Na_{2},Ca)_{2}K_{2}Al_{6}Si_{10}O_{32} · 12 H_{2}O, Gismondine Ca_{2}Al_{4}Si_{4}O_{16} · 9 H_{2}O, Harmotome (Ba,Na,K)_{(1-2)}(Si,Al)_{8}O_{16} · 6 H_{2}O, Phillipsite-Na (Na,K,Ca)_{(1-2)}(Si,Al)_{8}O_{16} · 6 H_{2}O, Phillipsite-Ca (Ca,K,Na)_{(1-2)}(Si,Al)_{8}O_{16} · 6 H_{2}O, Phillipsite-K (K,Na,Ca)_{(1-2)}(Si,Al)_{8}O_{16} · 6 H_{2}O, Merlinoite (K,Ca,Na,Ba)_{7}Si_{23}Al_{9}O_{64} · 23 H_{2}O, Mazzite-Mg K_{2}CaMg_{2}(Al,Si)_{36}O_{72} · 28 H_{2}O, Mazzite-Na Na_{8}Al_{8}Si_{28}O_{72} · 30 H_{2}O, Perlialite K_{8}Tl_{4}Al_{12}Si_{24}O_{72} · 20 H_{2}O, Boggsite NaCa_{2}(Al_{5}Si_{19}O_{48}) · 17 H_{2}O, Paulingite-Ca (Ca,K,Na,Ba)_{5}[Al_{10}Si_{35}O_{84}] · 34 H_{2}O, Paulingite-K (K_{2},Ca,Na_{2},Ba)_{5}Al_{10}Si_{35}O_{90} · 45 H_{2}O, Paulingite-Na (Na_{2},K_{2},Ca,Ba)_{5}Al_{10}Si_{35}O_{90} · 45 H_{2}O
- Chains of 6-membered rings – tabular zeolites
  - Gmelinite-Ca (Ca,Na_{2})Al_{2}Si_{4}O_{12} · 6 H_{2}O, Gmelinite-K (K,Na,Ca)_{6}(Al_{7}Si_{17}O_{48}) · 22 H_{2}O, Gmelinite-Na (Na_{2},Ca)Al_{2}Si_{4}O_{12} · 6 H_{2}O, Chabazite-K (K_{2},Ca,Na_{2},Mg)[Al_{2}Si_{4}O_{12}] · 6 H_{2}O, Chabazite-Ca (Ca_{0.5},Na,K)_{4}[Al_{4}Si_{8}O_{24}] · 12 H_{2}O, Chabazite-Na (Na_{2},K_{2},Ca,Mg)[Al_{2}Si_{4}O_{12}] · 6 H_{2}O, Chabazite-Sr (Sr,Ca,K_{2},Na_{2})[Al_{2}Si_{4}O_{12}] · 6 H_{2}O, Herschelite? (Na,Ca,K)AlSi_{2}O_{6} · 3 H_{2}O, Willhendersonite KCaAl_{3}Si_{3}O_{12} · 5 H_{2}O, Levyne-Ca (Ca,Na_{2},K_{2})Al_{2}Si_{4}O_{12} · 6 H_{2}O, Levyne-Na (Na_{2},Ca,K_{2})Al_{2}Si_{4}O_{12} · 6 H_{2}O, Bellbergite (K,Ba,Sr)_{2}Sr_{2}Ca_{2}(Ca,Na)_{4}Al_{18}Si_{18}O_{72} · 30 H_{2}O, Erionite-Ca (Ca,K_{2},Na_{2})_{2}[Al_{4}Si_{14}O_{36}] · 15 H_{2}O, Erionite-K (K_{2},Ca,Na_{2})_{2}[Al_{4}Si_{14}O_{36}] · 15 H_{2}O, Erionite-Na (Na_{2},K_{2},Ca)_{2}[Al_{4}Si_{14}O_{36}] · 15 H_{2}O, Wenkite Ba_{4}Ca_{6}(Si,Al)_{20}O_{39}(OH)_{2}(SO_{4})_{3} · H_{2}O (?), Offretite (K_{2},Ca,Mg)_{2.5}Al_{5}Si_{13}O_{36} · 15 H_{2}O, Faujasite-Ca (Ca,Na_{2},Mg)_{3.5}[Al_{7}Si_{17}O_{48}] · 32 H_{2}O, Faujasite-Mg (Mg,Na_{2},Ca)_{3.5}[Al_{7}Si_{17}O_{48}] · 32 H_{2}O, Faujasite-Na (Na_{2},Ca,Mg)_{3.5}[Al_{7}Si_{17}O_{48}] · 32 H_{2}O, Maricopaite Pb_{7}Ca_{2}(Si,Al)_{48}O_{100} · 32 H_{2}O, Mordenite (Ca,Na_{2},K_{2})Al_{2}Si_{10}O_{24} · 7 H_{2}O, Dachiardite-Ca (Ca,Na_{2},K_{2})_{5}Al_{10}Si_{38}O_{96} · 25 H_{2}O, Dachiardite-Na (Na_{2},Ca,K_{2})_{4}Al_{4}Si_{20}O_{48} · 13 H_{2}O, Epistilbite CaAl_{2}Si_{6}O_{16} · 5 H_{2}O, Ferrierite-K (K,Na)_{2}Mg(Si,Al)_{18}O_{36} · 9 H_{2}O, Ferrierite-Mg (Mg,Na,K)_{2}Mg(Si,Al)_{18}O_{36} · 9 H_{2}O, Ferrierite-Na (Na,K)_{2}Mg(Si,Al)_{18}O_{36} · 9 H_{2}O, Bikitaite Li_{2}[Al_{2}Si_{4}O_{12}] · 2 H_{2}O
- Chains of T_{10}O_{20} tetrahedra
  - Clinoptilolite-Na (Na,K,Ca)_{(2-3)}Al_{3}(Al,Si)_{2}Si_{13}O_{36} · 12 H_{2}O, Clinoptilolite-K (Na,K,Ca)_{(2-3)}Al_{3}(Al,Si)_{2}Si_{13}O_{36} · 12 H_{2}O, Clinoptilolite-Ca (Ca,Na,K)_{(2-3)}Al_{3}(Al,Si)_{2}Si_{13}O_{36} · 12 H_{2}O, Heulandite-Ba (Ba,Ca,K,Na,Sr)_{5}Al_{9}Si_{27}O_{72} · 22 H_{2}O, Heulandite-Ca (Ca,Na)_{(2-3)}Al_{3}(Al,Si)_{2}Si_{13}O_{36} · 12 H_{2}O, Heulandite-K (K,Na,Ca)_{(2-3)}Al_{3}(Al,Si)_{2}Si_{13}O_{36} · 12 H_{2}O, Heulandite-Na (Na,Ca)_{(2-3)}Al_{3}(Al,Si)_{2}Si_{13}O_{36} · 12 H_{2}O, Heulandite-Sr (Sr,Na,Ca)_{(2-3)}Al_{3}(Al,Si)_{2}Si_{13}O_{36} · 12 H_{2}O, Stilbite-Ca NaCa_{4}[Al_{8}Si_{28}O_{72}] · n H_{2}O ($\scriptstyle 28 \le n \le 32$), Stilbite-Na Na_{3}Ca_{3}[Al_{8}Si_{28}O_{72}] · n H_{2}O ($\scriptstyle28 \le n \le 32$), Barrerite (Na,K,Ca)_{2}Al_{2}Si_{7}O_{18} · 6 H_{2}O, Stellerite CaAl_{2}Si_{7}O_{18} · 7 H_{2}O, Brewsterite-Ba (Ba,Sr)Al_{2}Si_{6}O_{16} · 5 H_{2}O, Brewsterite-Sr (Sr,Ba)Al_{4}Si_{12}O_{32} · 10 H_{2}O
- Other rare zeolites
  - Terranovaite (Na,Ca)_{8}(Si_{68}Al_{12})O_{160} · 29 H_{2}O, Gottardiite Na_{3}Mg_{3}Ca_{5}Al_{19}Si_{117}O_{272} · 93 H_{2}O, Lovdarite K_{2}Na_{6}Be_{4}Si_{14}O_{36} · 9 H_{2}O, Gaultite Na_{4}Zn_{2}Si_{7}O_{18} · 5 H_{2}O, Chiavennite CaMnBe_{2}Si_{5}O_{13}(OH)_{2} · 2 H_{2}O, Tschernichite (Ca,Na)(Si_{6}Al_{2})O_{16} · (4-8) H_{2}O, Mutinaite Na_{3}Ca_{4}Si_{85}Al_{11}O_{192} · 60 H_{2}O, Tschortnerite Ca_{4}(Ca,Sr,K,Ba)_{3}Cu_{3}(OH)_{8}[Si_{12}Al_{12}O_{48}] · x H_{2}O, $\scriptstyle x \ge 20$, Thornasite Na_{12}Th_{3}[Si_{8}O_{19}]_{4} · 18 H_{2}O, Direnzoite NaK_{6}MgCa_{2}(Al_{13}Si_{47}O_{120}) · 36 H_{2}O
- Unclassified zeolites
  - Cowlesite CaAl_{2}Si_{3}O_{10} · (5-6) H_{2}O, Mountainite (Ca,Na_{2},K_{2})_{2}Si_{4}O_{10} · 3 H_{2}O

== See also ==
- Classification of non-silicate minerals – List of IMA recognized minerals and groupings
- Crystal system – Classification of crystalline materials by their three-dimensional structural geometry
- List of rock types
