= Magnesiocarpholite =

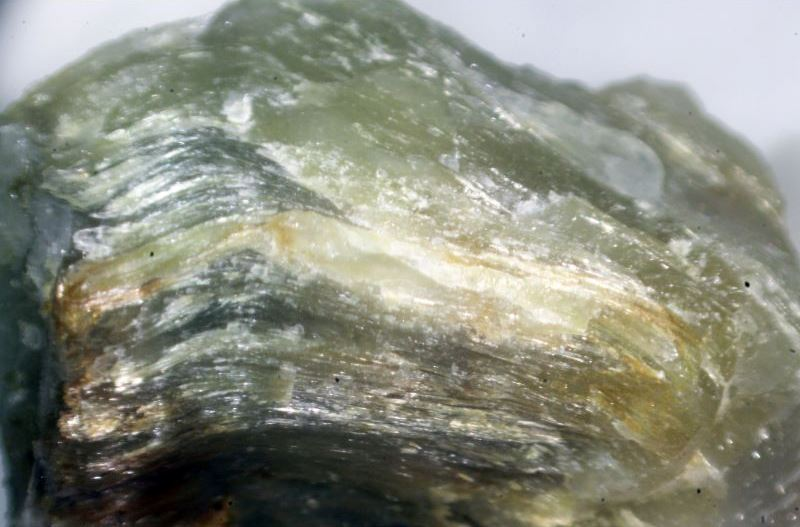
- Greenish specimen of magnesiocarpholite from Vanoise, Savoie, France

General
- Category: Inosilicates
- Formula: MgAl_{2}Si_{2}O_{6}(OH)_{4}
- IMA symbol: Mcar
- Strunz classification: 9.DB.05
- Dana classification: 65.1.5.3
- Crystal system: Orthorhombic
- Crystal class: mmm (2/m 2/m 2/m) - Dipyramidal
- Space group: Ccca (no. 38)
- Unit cell: a = 13.714(2) Å, b = 20.079(2) Å, c = 5.105(1) Å; Z = 8

Identification
- Formula mass: 298.46 g/mol
- Color: Light green to grayish
- Crystal habit: Small acicular to fibrous crystals
- Mohs scale hardness: 5 - 5½
- Luster: Silky
- Streak: White
- Diaphaneity: Transparent
- Specific gravity: 2.88 (Calculated)
- Optical properties: Biaxial (−)
- Refractive index: nα = 1.59 nβ = 1.6 nγ = 1.61
- Birefringence: δ = 0.020
- 2V angle: Measured: 50° to 60°, Calculated: 88°
- Dispersion: r > v distinct
- Ultraviolet fluorescence: Non-fluorescent
- Common impurities: Ti,Fe,Mn,Ca,Na,K,H2O,P

Magnesiocarpholite is a rare magnesium-bearing inosilicate mineral in the carpholite group, with ideal formula MgAl_{2}Si_{2}O_{6}(OH)_{4}. It typically forms very slender, acicular crystals with a silky appearance. Magnesiocarpholite occurs in high-pressure, low-temperature metamorphic rocks and is used by geologists as a marker for subduction-zone conditions in magnesium-rich sedimentary rocks.

== Discovery ==
Magnesiocarpholite was first recognised as a distinct magnesium-rich member of the carpholite group in the early 1980s. It was first discovered in the Vanoise Massif of Savoie, France, which is considered its type locality. In high-pressure laboratory experiments, Christian Chopin, a French mineralogist and metamorphic petrologist, and an emeritus research director at the CNRS working in the geology laboratory of the École Normale Supérieure in Paris, was able to recreate Magnesiocarpholite in a lab as a Mg-rich carpholite under conditions similar to those in deeply buried sedimentary rocks, and showed that this phase had a consistent composition close to MgAl_{2}Si_{2}O_{6}(OH)_{4}. Follow-up work showed that magnesiocarpholite, together with the related mineral magnesiochloritoid, could be used to estimate the pressures and temperatures reached by certain metamorphosed sedimentary rocks.

Studies of naturally occurring Mg-rich carpholite from Alpine and Mediterranean high-pressure subduction/collisional zones helped to define the structure of magnesiocarpholite. These investigations confirmed that magnesiocarpholite is orthorhombic and occupies the magnesium end of the carpholite group, with carpholite and ferrocarpholite representing the manganese- and iron-rich equivalents.

== Chemistry and properties ==
Magnesiocarpholite is a hydrous magnesium–aluminium silicate. Its structure is made of silicate units bonded to metal atoms and hydroxyl (OH) groups.

Because magnesiocarpholite contains hydroxyl (OH) groups, its formation requires water to be available during metamorphism. Water is incorporated into the crystal structure as hydroxyl, so the mineral effectively “stores” water, (much like serpentinization). When magnesiocarpholite breaks down, its structurally bound water can be released during metamorphic reactions. Magnesiocarpholite forms during high-pressure, low-temperature metamorphism of magnesium-rich, clay-rich sedimentary rocks (Mg-rich pelitic compositions). Experimental and phase-equilibrium studies show that it is stable only within a relatively narrow range of conditions typical of deeply buried metasediments in cold subduction-related settings, including pelitic blueschists.

It is part of the carpholite group, whose members share a similar chemical structure but differ mainly in which metal dominates the chemical bond. Manganese-dominant minerals are carpholite, iron-dominant minerals are ferrocarpholite, and magnesium-dominant minerals are magnesiocarpholite.

Natural Magnesiocarpholite commonly contains minor iron (Fe) and manganese (Mn), with trace amounts of elements such as calcium (Ca), sodium (Na), potassium (K), titanium (Ti) and phosphorus (P).

Magnesiocarpholite crystallises in the orthorhombic system (space group Ccca). This means its crystal structure repeats in a rectangular pattern with three unequal directions at right angles. The repeating “building block” of the structure (the unit cell) has dimensions of about a = 13.714(2) Å, b = 20.079(2) Å and c = 5.105(1) Å, and contains eight formula units (Z = 8). It typically forms extremely slender, needle-like (acicular) to fibrous crystals. These commonly occur as bundles of parallel needles or as felted (matted) aggregates. Specimens are usually light green to greyish and may show a silky lustre when many fine fibres are aligned. Although more research is needed, Magnesiocarpholite resembles some other asbestiform minerals. Due to its rarity, toxicology research is sparse.

Magnesiocarpholite has a Mohs hardness of about 5–5½ and a calculated specific gravity of about 2.88. It has a white streak and is non-fluorescent under ultraviolet light. Optically it is biaxial negative with refractive indices around n_{α} ≈ 1.59, n_{β} ≈ 1.60 and n_{γ} ≈ 1.61 (birefringence ≈ 0.020). In thin section it is generally colourless to very pale green, and elongate grains show straight to slightly inclined extinction.

Experimental studies constrain magnesiocarpholite to a limited stability range at relatively low temperatures and elevated pressures in Mg-rich pelitic compositions. Beyond this stability field it breaks down into other minerals, commonly including sudoite, chlorite, kyanite and quartz.

== Extent ==
Magnesiocarpholite is found in a small number of high-pressure metamorphic terranes. The vast majority of known magnesiocarpholite is found in the Vanoise Massif in the western Alps of France. It is found in metasedimentary rocks within Alpine subduction and collision zones. Additional occurrences are reported from the western Harz Mountains of Germany. Several localities in the northern Apennines and Aegean region, where it is hosted by metamorphosed pelitic and quartz-rich sedimentary rocks.

In these settings, magnesiocarpholite occurs in association with minerals such as chloritoid, chlorite, lawsonite, phengite and garnet. It is typically found in veins or layers within metapelites and metasandstones that have been buried to great depths and later retrograded to the surface.

== See also ==
- List of minerals recognized by the International Mineralogical Association
- List of minerals
