= Carpolite =

Carpolite may refer to:

- Carpolite in paleontology refers to a fossilized fruit, nut, or seed
- Carpolite in construction for a limestone aggregate or crushed stone

== See also ==
- Carpholite, a manganese silicate mineral
