= Carpholite =

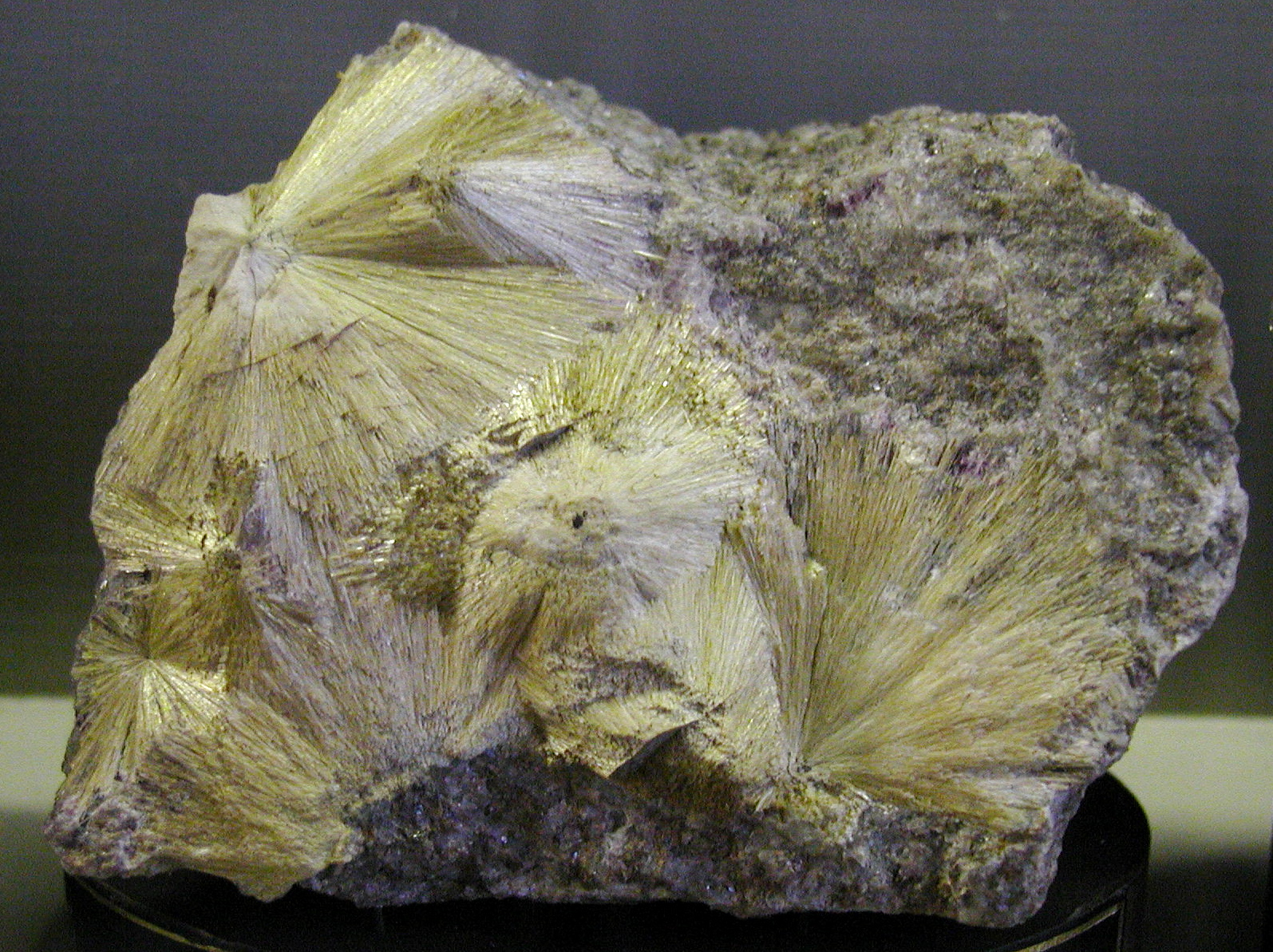

General
- Category: Inosilicate
- Formula: Mn^{2+}Al_{2}Si_{2}O_{6}(OH)_{4}
- IMA symbol: Car
- Strunz classification: 9.DB.05
- Crystal system: Orthorhombic
- Crystal class: Dipyramidal (mmm); H-M symbol: (2/m 2/m 2/m)
- Space group: Ccca
- Unit cell: a = 13.83, b = 20.31, c = 5.13 [Å]; Z = 8

Identification
- Color: Yellow
- Crystal habit: Prismatic, acicular to fibrous clusters
- Twinning: On {100}
- Cleavage: Perfect on {010}
- Tenacity: Brittle
- Mohs scale hardness: 5.5-6
- Luster: Silky
- Diaphaneity: Translucent
- Specific gravity: 2.935-3.031
- Optical properties: Biaxial (-)
- Refractive index: n_{α} = 1.610 n_{β} = 1.628 n_{γ} = 1.630
- Birefringence: δ = 0.020
- Pleochroism: Distinct; X = Y = pale yellow; Z = colorless

Carpholite is a manganese silicate mineral with formula Mn^{2+}Al_{2}Si_{2}O_{6}(OH)_{4}. It occurs as yellow clusters of slender prisms or needles. It crystallizes in the orthorhombic system.

The carpholite group includes ferrocarpholite, magnesiocarpholite, vanadiocarpholite, and potassiccarpholite.

== Discovery and occurrence ==
It was first described in 1817 for an occurrence in Horní Slavkov (Schlaggenwald), Karlovy Vary Region, Bohemia. The name derives from Greek karfos for "straw" and lithos for "stone" due to its crystal habit.

Its typical occurrence is in shales that have undergone low grade metamorphism. Associated minerals include sudoite, manganoan garnet, chloritoid and fluorite.
