= Ottrelite =

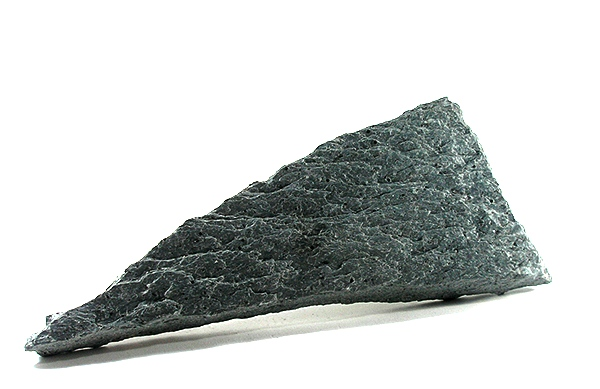
- Ottrelite

General
- Category: Nesosilicate
- Formula: (Mn,Fe,Mg)_{2}Al_{4}Si_{2}O_{10}(OH)_{4}
- Strunz classification: 09.AF.85

Identification
- Formula mass: 490.11
- Color: Pistachio green
- Crystal habit: Granular
- Twinning: Polysynthetic, {001}
- Cleavage: {001} perfect; {110} likely
- Mohs scale hardness: 6–7
- Luster: Vitreous to nearly adamantine on cleavages
- Streak: Greenish, grayish
- Diaphaneity: Translucent
- Specific gravity: 3.50
- Density: 3.52
- Dispersion: r > v, strong

Ottrelite is a form of chloritoid. Its empirical formula is (Mn,Fe,Mg)_{2}Al_{4}Si_{2}O_{10}(OH)_{4}.

== See also ==
- List of minerals
