= Eric J. Essene =

American university professor, University of Michigan, Ann Arbor (1939–2010)

Eric J. Essene (April 26, 1939, Berkeley, California – May 20, 2011, Ann Arbor, Michigan) was a professor emeritus of geosciences and a metamorphic petrologist at the University of Michigan. In 2010, Essene was awarded the Penrose Medal by the Geological Society of America. He was a leader in the development of geothermobarometry as a tool in understanding the rock assemblages of high grade metamorphic suites and the evolution of continental crust.

Essene earned his BS in geosciences from the Massachusetts Institute of Technology in 1961 and his Ph.D. from the University of California, Berkeley in 1967. He served post-doctoral positions at Cambridge University and Australian National University after gaining his doctorate from Berkeley, then began his long career in teaching and research at the University of Michigan in 1970.

The mineral Esseneite was named for Essene.
