= Vanadiocarpholite =

General
- Category: Silicate mineral
- Formula: Mn^{2+}V^{3+}AlSi_{2}O_{6}(OH)_{4}
- IMA symbol: Vcar
- Strunz classification: 9.DB.05
- Crystal system: Orthorhombic
- Crystal class: Dipyramidal (mmm); H-M symbol: (2/m 2/m 2/m)
- Space group: Ccca
- Unit cell: a = 13.83 Å, b = 20.681 Å c = 5.188 Å; Z = 8

Identification
- Color: Pale-straw yellow, honey-yellow to brown
- Crystal habit: Prismatic to acicular crystal clusters, vein fillings
- Cleavage: Perfect on {010}
- Tenacity: Flexible
- Luster: Vitreous, silky
- Diaphaneity: Transparent
- Optical properties: Biaxial (+)
- Refractive index: n_{α}=1.684, n_{β}=1.691, n_{γ}=1.7
- Birefringence: 0.0160

Vanadiocarpholite (Mn^{2+}V^{3+}AlSi_{2}O_{6}(OH)_{4}) is straw yellow to brown silicate mineral. It crystallizes in the orthorhombic crystal system. It is the vanadium rich variety of carpholite (Mn^{2+}Al_{2}Si_{2}O_{6}(OH)_{4}).

== Discovery and occurrence ==
It was first described in 2005 for an occurrence in the Molinello Mine, Graveglia Valley, Genova Province, Liguria, Italy. It occurs in chert in a manganese ore deposit as vein fillings in silicified wood.

== Chemical composition ==
It consists of:

Manganese	15.56%	Mn	20.09%	MnO
Aluminium	7.64%	Al	14.44%	Al_{2}O_{3}
Vanadium	14.43%	V	21.23%	V_{2}O_{3}
Silicon	15.91%	Si	34.04%	SiO_{2}
Hydrogen	1.14%	H	10.21%	H_{2}O
Oxygen	45.32%	O		
