= Davisite =

Inosilicate mineral

General
- Category: Inosilicate minerals (single chain)
- Group: Pyroxene group, clinopyroxene subgroup
- Formula: CaScAlSiO_{6}

Davisite is an exceedingly rare mineral of the pyroxene group, with formula CaScAlSiO_{6}. It is the scandium-dominant member. It stands for scandium-analogue of other pyroxene-group members, esseneite, grossmanite and kushiroite. Davisite is one of scarce minerals containing essential scandium.

It is named for Andrew M. Davis, an American meteoriticist and professor of astronomy and geoscience at the University of Chicago.

Based on a synthesized sample, the mineral likely crystallizes in the monoclinic crystal system with space group C2/c.
