= Kanoite =

Pyroxene mineral

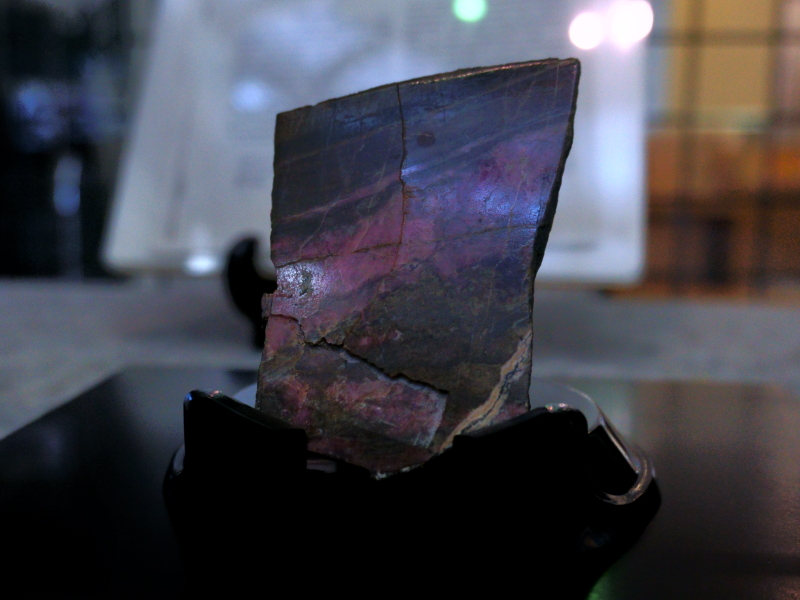
- Kanoite exhibited at the Mining Museum of Akita University, Japan

General
- Category: Inosilicate minerals (single chain)
- Group: Pyroxene group, clinopyroxene subgroup
- Formula: (Mg,Mn^{2+})_{2}Si_{2}O_{6}
- IMA symbol: Knt
- Crystal system: Monoclinic
- Crystal class: Prismatic (2/m) (same H-M symbol)
- Space group: P2_{1}/c
- Unit cell: a = 9.73, b = 8.93 c = 5.26 [Å]; β = 108.56°; Z = 4

Identification
- Formula mass: 246.73 g/mol
- Color: Light pinkish brown
- Twinning: Polysynthetic
- Cleavage: Perfect on {110}, {110} - {11̅0} = 88°
- Mohs scale hardness: 6
- Luster: vitreous
- Diaphaneity: Semitransparent
- Specific gravity: 3.66
- Optical properties: Biaxial (+)
- Refractive index: n_{α} = 1.715 n_{β} = 1.715 n_{γ} = 1.728
- Birefringence: 0.0130
- 2V angle: 40-42 measured

Kanoite is a light pinkish brown silicate mineral that is found in metamorphic rocks. It is an inosilicate and has a chemical formula of (Mg,Mn^{2+})_{2}Si_{2}O_{6}. It is a member of pyroxene group and clinopyroxene subgroup.

== Crystallography ==
Kanoite crystallizes in the monoclinic crystal system. Its Hermann–Mauguin Symbol is 2/m. Under this crystal system, the three axes of the crystal are all different in length. The a and the b axes are perpendicular, and b and c axes are perpendicular. The a and c axes make an oblique shape. The axial ratio for kanoite is a:b:c =1.0894:1:0.5884 and the cell dimensions are: a = 9.73, b = 8.93 and c = 5.26 Å with Z = 4. Kanoite has a 2-fold axis and a mirror plane.

Kanoite is birefringent. It occurs as a mineral has 3 different indices of refraction. When the light passes through the Kanoite medium, the light splits due to unequal reflection from the crystal faces. As kanoite is birefringent, it is also anisotropic. In an anisotropic mineral, the velocity of light differs as the direction of the crystal changes.

== Discovery and occurrence ==
Kanoite is a rare mineral which was found in Tatehira mine, Kumaishi, Oshima Peninsula, Hokkaido, Japan in 1977. In the type locality kanoite occurs along a joint that cuts a pyroxmangite-cummingtonite metamorphic rock in a manganese ore deposit. The region has undergone contact metamorphism as magma intruded the area. It was named to honor Hiroshi Kano, a petrology professor at Akita University in Japan.

It has also been reported from Broken Hill, New South Wales, Australia, the Semail Ophiolite in Oman, and the Balmat–Edwards zinc district, Saint Lawrence County, New York.
