= Minasgeraisite-(Y) =

Discredited gadolinite mineral

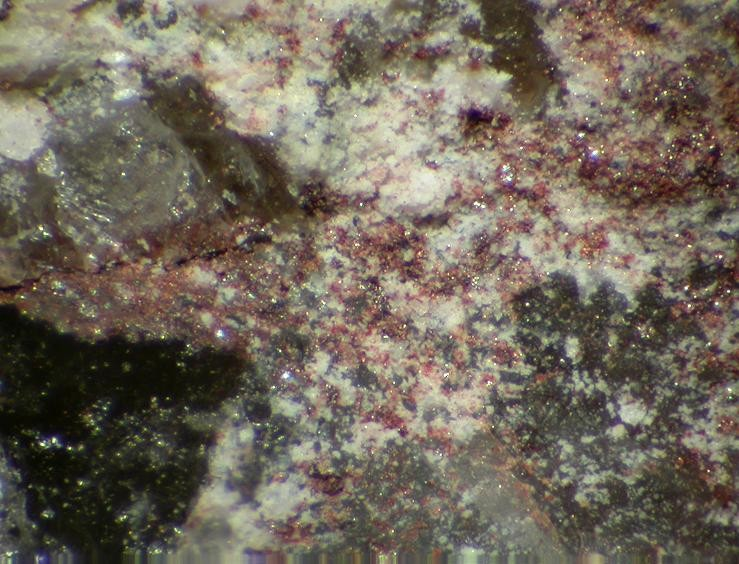
- Red microcrystals of minasgeraisite-(Y). Field of view is three millimeters (0.12 in).

General
- Category: Nesosilicate minerals, gadolinite supergroup, group, and subgroup
- Formula: (Ca_{2}Y_{2})□_{2}(Be_{2}B_{2})Si_{4}O_{16}(OH)_{4}
- IMA symbol: Mgr-Y
- Strunz classification: 9.AJ.20
- Crystal system: Triclinic
- Space group: P1

Identification
- Color: Purple to lavender purple
- Tenacity: Brittle
- Mohs scale hardness: 6–7
- Luster: Sub-vitreous, resinous, dull
- Streak: Very pale purple
- Diaphaneity: Transparent
- Specific gravity: 4.29
- Optical properties: Biaxial (+)
- Refractive index: nα = 1.740 nβ = 1.754 nγ = 1.786
- Birefringence: 0.046
- Pleochroism: Moderate
- 2V angle: 68° (average)

Minasgeraisite-(Y) is a discredited mineral species in the gadolinite supergroup with the chemical formula (Ca_{2}Y_{2})□_{2}(Be_{2}B_{2})Si_{4}O_{16}(OH)_{4}. Typically appearing as minute, purplish-lavender rosettes in granitic pegmatites, it was first identified at the José Pinto quarry in 1986 in Jaguaraçu, Minas Gerais, Brazil. The mineral was named after its type locality and approved by the International Mineralogical Association (IMA). Subsequent crystallographic and chemical analyses of the type material, as well as of comparable specimens from Norway and Central Europe, led to the mineral's discreditation in 2023. It is now regarded as a bismuth- and manganese-rich variety of hingganite-(Y).

== Characteristics ==
Minasgeraisite-(Y) is typically purplish-lavender in color. It is transparent with a sub-vitreous, resinous, or dull luster and a pale purple streak. The mineral is brittle and has a specific gravity of 4.29. Minasgeraisite-(Y) has a hardness of 6–7 on the Mohs scale.

When viewed with polarized light under a petrographic microscope, minasgeraisite-(Y) appears colorless, pale grayish yellow, and lavender purple and moderately exhibits pleochroism. It is biaxial positive and has an optic angle (2V) of 68°. When measured along different crystallographic directions, its refractive indices are nα = 1.740, nβ = 1.754, and nγ = 1.786. This gives it a birefringence of 0.046.

== Origins ==
Minasgeraisite-(Y) was described as a new member of the gadolinite group in a paper by Eugene E. Foord et al. published in 1986, with its type locality designated as the Jaguaraçu granitic pegmatite in Minas Gerais, Brazil. The mineral was discovered at the Mr. José Pinto quarry, a site known for its complex, zoned pegmatitic formations, in which different minerals occur in distinct internal layers. The mineral was initially named minasgeraisite and approved by the International Mineralogical Association (IMA) under proposal 83-90. The name was later changed to minasgeraisite-(Y) to conform to IMA nomenclature standards for rare-earth element minerals, with the suffix "-(Y)" indicating yttrium as the dominant rare-earth element. The initial discovery of minasgeraisite-(Y) stemmed from investigations led by Foord following the collection of fine milarite crystals at the site in 1980. During this work, small amounts of an unidentified lilac-colored mineral were found in the drusy cavities. In 2021, minasgeraisite-(Y) was assigned the IMA symbol Mgr-Y.

Subsequent re-investigations of material from the type locality, including crystallographic and chemical studies, led to the discreditation of minasgeraisite-(Y) as a distinct species in 2023. The discreditation was made based on IMA-CNMNC Proposal 23-F. Modern analyses have demonstrated that the material originally described as minasgeraisite-(Y) is structurally and compositionally consistent with bismuth- and manganese-rich varieties of hingganite-(Y).

== Occurrence ==
Minasgeraisite-(Y) occurs as a late-stage accessory mineral that formed during the late stages of pegmatite crystallization. Other minerals associated with minasgeraisite-(Y) include milarite, albite, quartz, muscovite, hematite, amazonite, orthoclase, almandine–spessartine, magnetite, churchite-(Y), elbaite, pyrite, cerussite, pyromorphite, and anatase. Within the zoned, complex pegmatite, it appears in small druses. The mineral is found as minute sheaf-like crystals less than 3–5 μm across, forming rosettes that range from 0.2 to 1.0 mm in diameter, which may occur singly or in aggregates.

Although minasgeraisite-(Y) was initially described only from its Brazilian type locality, subsequent studies identified chemically similar material at the Heftetjern pegmatite in southern Norway, which was interpreted as a second occurrence. Additional reports have noted similar compositions from the Krenn quarry in Germany, the Vlastějovice region in the Czech Republic, and Rigó Hill in Hungary. However, these specimens did not match the ideal end-member composition, and the researcher Oleg S. Vereshchagin considered the Brazilian locality to be the only confirmed source of minasgeraisite-(Y) as originally described.

== Structure ==
Minasgeraisite-(Y) was originally described as a member of the gadolinite supergroup, a group of minerals characterized by the general formula A_{2}MQ_{2}T_{2}O_{8}φ_{2}, where A, M, Q, T represent distinct crystallographic sites occupied by different cations, and φ denotes anions such as hydroxyl or oxygen. Prior to recent reinvestigation, the crystal structure was typically understood as composed of alternating layers parallel to the (100) plane within a monoclinic symmetry, most commonly space group P2_{1}/c. One layer consists of interconnected TO_{4} and QO_{4} tetrahedra forming sheets with a characteristic 4.8^{2} net, featuring four- and eight-membered rings where silicon alternates with beryllium or boron. The A and M cations reside in polyhedral sites situated between these tetrahedral sheets.

In the initial description, minasgeraisite-(Y) was assigned a monoclinic symmetry with space group P2_{1}/a and an end-member formula Y_{2}CaBe_{2}Si_{2}O_{10}. This formulation suggested calcium as the dominant cation in the characterized by sixfold coordination, meaning the occupant is surrounded by six oxygen atoms in an octahedral arrangement. This assignment was considered unusual, since calcium generally favors larger sites with higher coordination numbers in other gadolinite group minerals.

Subsequent single-crystal studies, however, revealed that material from the type locality and comparable samples from Norway exhibited triclinic symmetry with space group P1, deviating from the monoclinic norm seen in related minerals such as datolite and hingganite-(Y). This reduction in symmetry is attributed to significant cation ordering at the A sites. In this triclinic structure, the single A site splits into four distinct and non-equivalent sites (denoted W1 through W4), occupied by bismuth, calcium, and rare-earth elements (primarily yttrium and other heavy lanthanides). Bismuth predominates at W1, calcium at W2, and yttrium and other rare-earth elements occupy W3 and W4, demonstrating nearly complete cation ordering. The currently accepted formula for minasgeraisite-(Y) is therefore represented as (Ca_{2}Y_{2})□_{2}(Be_{2}B_{2})Si_{4}O_{16}(OH)_{4}.
