= Potassic-magnesio-fluoro-arfvedsonite =

General
- Category: Silicate
- Formula: [(K,Na)][Na2][Mg4Fe3+][Si8O22][(F,OH)2]
- IMA symbol: Pmfarf
- Crystal system: Monoclinic
- Crystal class: 2/m - Prismatic
- Space group: C2/m

Identification
- Color: Bluish-Gray
- Twinning: Common on TL, as simple or lamellar (ll57A) on {100}
- Cleavage: Perfect on {110}
- Fracture: Splintery
- Tenacity: Brittle
- Mohs scale hardness: 6
- Lustre: Vitreous
- Streak: White
- Specific gravity: 3.174 g/cm^{3}
- Optical properties: Biaxial Negative
- Ultraviolet fluorescence: None

Potassic-magnesio-fluoro-arfvedsonite is an amphibole mineral first discovered in Quebec, Canada, in an area which is part of the Canadian Shield which is where some of the oldest exposed rocks are that can date back to over 4 billion years ago. Potassic-magnesio-fluoro-arfvedsonite is also the mineral with the longest name of any mineral with 34 letters and 37 characters.

== Occurrence ==
Potassic-magnesio-fluoro-arfvedsonite is found in igneous rocks. The rocks it is found in are classified as a complex mafic ultrapotassic peralkaline igneous rock with high silica contents. Most commonly it is found with Lamproite. Potassic-magnesio-fluoro-arfvedsonite is a uniquely rare mineral, as it occurs in small amounts in very few locations around the world.

== Physical properties ==
Potassic-magnesio-fluoro-arfvedsonite is a bluish-gray mineral with a vitreous luster. It exhibits a hardness of 6 on the Mohs hardness scale. It leaves a white streak of powder behind when you rub it against another surface. Potassic-magnesio-fluoro-arfvedsonite shows perfect cleavage along the {110} plane. The calculated density is 3.174 g/cm^{3}.

== Age ==
Potassic-magnesio-fluoro-arfvedsonite has only been found in a handful of regions. These regions are Quebec, Canada, Montepuez District, Mozambique, Troms Og Finnmark, Norway, Dakhla-Oued Ed-Dahab. Morocco, and Las Vegas, USA. One thing all these locations have in common is the rock formations are older rocks that range from the late Archean eon to the Proterozoic. This range goes from around 2.5 billion years ago to 538 million years ago.

== Name ==
When potassic-magnesio-fluoro-arfevdsonite was first discovered in Quebec in 1985 it was named Potassium fluor-magnesio-arfvedsonite. It was seen as a potassium rich fluor-magnesio-arfvedsonite (now renamed magnesio-fluoro-arfvedsonite). In 2006 it was renamed by the IMA as fluoro-potassic-magnesio-arfvedsonite. and later in 2012 it was renamed again as potassic-magnesio-fluoro-arfvedsonite. It has this name as it is an arfvedsonite that has magnesium, potassium, and fluorine. Potassic-magnesio-fluoro-arfvedsonite has 37 characters which is the longest for any approved mineral.

== Chemical composition ==
Oxide	wt%
SiO_{2}	54.25
TiO_{2}	1.08
Al_{2}O_{3}	0.03
Cr_{2}O_{3}	n.a.
Fe_{2}O_{3}	8.07
FeO	13.23<FeO_{tot}<14.52
MnO	0.32
ZnO	0.05
MgO	13.99
BaO+SrO	n.a.
CaO	1.16
Na_{2}O	6.33
K_{2}O	5.20
H_{2}O	0.74
F	2.20
–O=F	-0.93
Total	99.18

== X-ray diffraction and Crystallography ==
Face	D(Å)
110	8.539
131	3.412
240	3.298
310	3.183
3̅31	2.759
151	2.718
260	2.551
3̅51	2.352
331	2.269

The X ray diffraction of potassic-magnesio-fluoro-arfevsonite gave values of the chart above. Calculated unit cell dimensions are a = 9.9591(4), b = 17.9529(7), c = 5.2867(2) Å, β = 104.340(1)°, V = 919.73(10) Å^{3}, Z = 2. Potassic-magnesio-fluoro-arfvedsonite is part of the monoclinic crystal system and in the space group C2/m. Potassic-magnesio-fluoro-arfvedsonite is a double chain inosilicate.
