= Kaersutite =

Calcic titanium bearing amphibole mineral

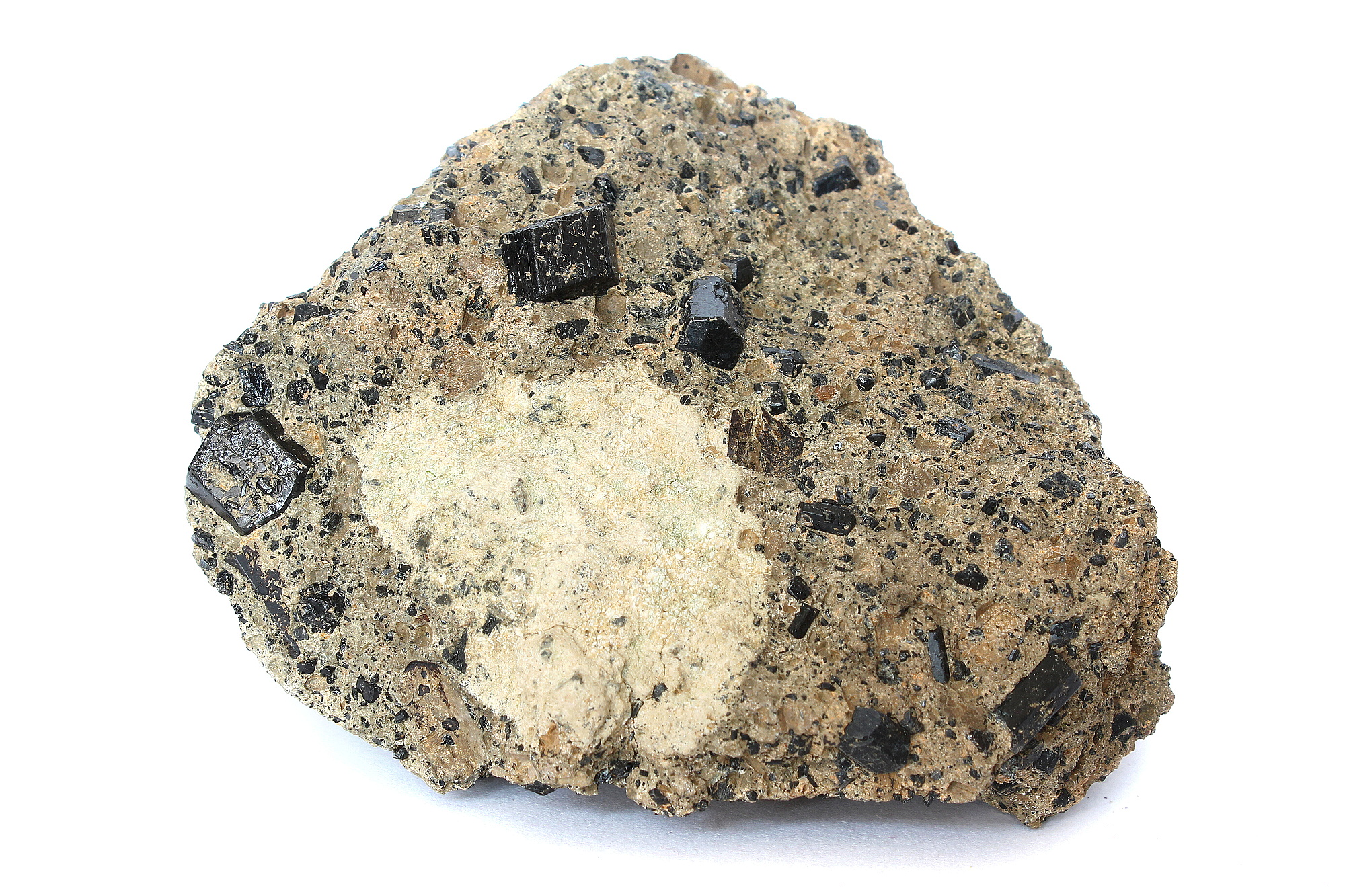
- Kaersutite (black) in tuff. Locality: Suletice, Czech Republic

General
- Category: Inosilicate
- Formula: NaCa_{2}(Mg_{3}Ti^{4+}Al)(Si_{6}Al_{2})O_{22}(O)_{2}
- IMA symbol: Krs
- Strunz classification: 9.DE.10
- Dana classification: 66.01.03a.18
- Crystal system: Monoclinic
- Crystal class: Prismatic (2/m) (same H-M symbol)
- Space group: C2/m

Identification
- Color: Dark brown to black, yellow-brown, green-brown, or red-brown in thin section
- Crystal habit: Prismatic phenocrysts, granular aggregates
- Twinning: Simple or multiple twinning parallel to {100}
- Cleavage: Perfect on {110}, intersecting at 56° and 124°
- Tenacity: Brittle
- Mohs scale hardness: 5–6
- Luster: Vitreous
- Streak: Pale brownish-grey
- Diaphaneity: Semitransparent
- Specific gravity: 3.20–3.28
- Optical properties: Biaxial (−)
- Refractive index: nα = 1.670–1.689 nβ = 1.690–1.741 nγ = 1.700–1.772
- Birefringence: δ = 0.030–0.083
- Pleochroism: Strong; X = yellow, yellow-brown; Y = red, red-brown; Z = deep brown, dark red-brown.
- 2V angle: 66–82°

Kaersutite is a dark brown to black double-chain calcic titanium-bearing amphibole mineral with formula: NaCa_{2}(Mg_{3}Ti^{4+}Al)(Si_{6}Al_{2})O_{22}(O)_{2}.

Ferro-kaersutite is the divalent iron-rich endmember of the kaersutite group, with the iron replacing magnesium in the structure.

Kaersutite occurs as phenocrysts in alkalic volcanic rocks, in nodules of peridotite and gabbro in alkalic basalts, and in syenites, monzonites, and carbonatite tuffs. Mineral associations include titanian augite, rhoenite, olivine, ilmenite, spinel, plagioclase, and titanian pargasite.

It was first described in 1884 and is named for Qaersut (formerly Kaersut), Umanq district in northern Greenland.
