= Richterite =

Sodium amphibole mineral

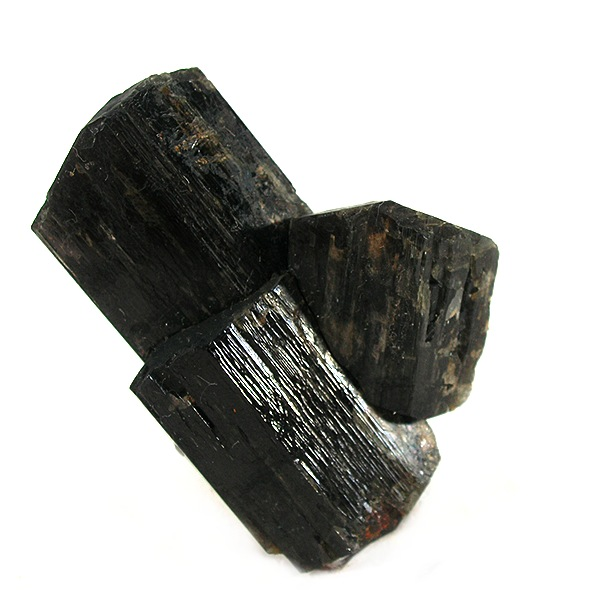
- Richterite. Wilberforce, Monmouth Township, Haliburton County, Ontario, Canada.

General
- Category: Inosilicates
- Formula: Na(NaCa)Mg_{5}Si_{8}O_{22}(OH)_{2}#
- IMA symbol: Rct
- Strunz classification: 9.DE.20
- Crystal system: Monoclinic
- Crystal class: Prismatic (2/m) (same H-M symbol)
- Space group: C2/m

Identification
- Color: Brown, yellow, red, or green
- Crystal habit: Prismatic; acicular or asbestiform
- Twinning: Simple or multiple parallel to {100}
- Cleavage: Perfect
- Fracture: Uneven, brittle
- Mohs scale hardness: 5–6
- Luster: Vitreous
- Streak: Pale yellow
- Diaphaneity: Transparent to translucent
- Specific gravity: 3.0–3.5
- Optical properties: Biaxial (−)
- Refractive index: nα = 1.615 nβ = 1.629 nγ = 1.636
- Birefringence: δ = 0.021
- Pleochroism: Strong: pale yellow, orange, and red
- 2V angle: 68° measured

Richterite is a sodium calcium magnesium silicate mineral belonging to the amphibole group. If iron replaces the magnesium within the structure of the mineral, it is called ferrorichterite; if fluorine replaces the hydroxyl, it is called fluororichterite. Richterite crystals are long and prismatic, or prismatic to fibrous aggregate, or rock-bound crystals. Colors of richterite range from brown, grayish-brown, yellow, brownish- to rose-red, or pale to dark green. Richterite occurs in thermally metamorphosed limestones in contact metamorphic zones. It also occurs as a hydrothermal product in mafic igneous rocks, and in manganese-rich ore deposits. Localities include Mont-Saint-Hilaire, Quebec, and Wilberforce and Tory Hill, Ontario, Canada; Långban and Pajsberg, Sweden; West Kimberley, Western Australia; Sanka, Myanmar; and, in the US, at Iron Hill, Colorado; Leucite Hills, Wyoming; and Libby, Montana. The mineral was named in 1865 for the German mineralogist Hieronymous Theodor Richter (1824–1898).
