= Holmquistite =

Lithium magnesium aluminium inosilicate mineral

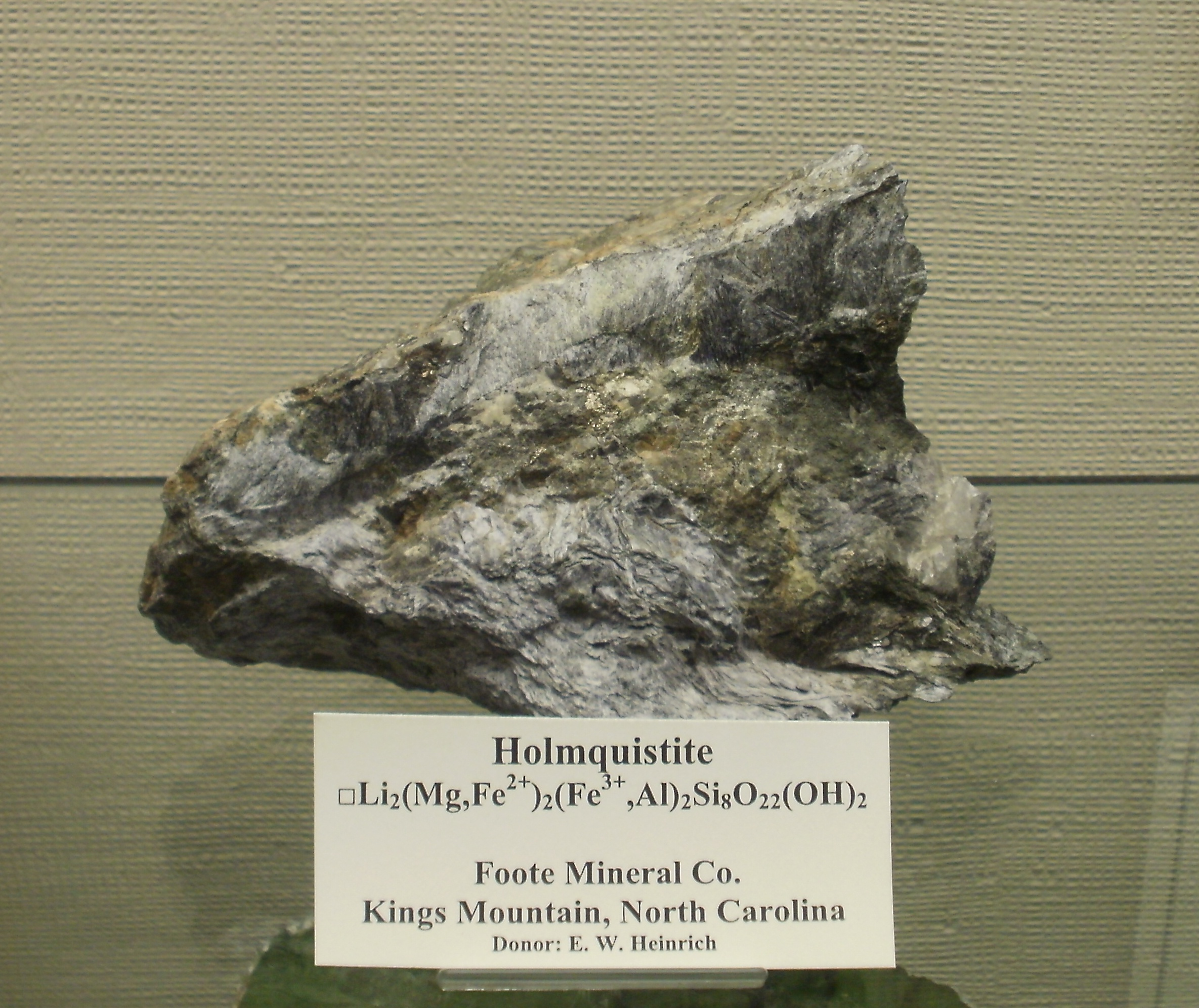
- Holmquistite from the Foote Mineral Co., Kings Mountain, North Carolina

General
- Category: Inosilicate
- Formula: (Li_{2})(Mg_{3}Al_{2})(Si_{8}O_{22})(OH)_{2}
- IMA symbol: Hlm
- Strunz classification: 9.DD.05
- Dana classification: 66.1.2.9
- Crystal system: Orthorhombic
- Crystal class: Dipyramidal (mmm); H-M Symbol: (2/m 2/m 2/m)
- Space group: Pnma

Holmquistite is a lithium magnesium aluminium inosilicate mineral with chemical formula Li_{2}(Mg,Fe^{2+})_{3}Al_{2}Si_{8}O_{22}(OH)_{2}. It crystallizes in the orthorhombic crystal system as prismatic crystals up to 10 cm (3.9 in) or as massive aggregates. It has a Mohs hardness of 5–6 and a specific gravity of 2.95 to 3.13.

Color could vary from black, dark violet to light sky blue.

It occurs as metasomatic replacements on the margins of lithium rich pegmatites.

It was first described in 1913 from an occurrence in Utö, near Stockholm, Sweden. It was named for the Swedish petrologist Per Johan Holmquist (1866–1946).
