= Fluoro-richterite =

Fluororichterite
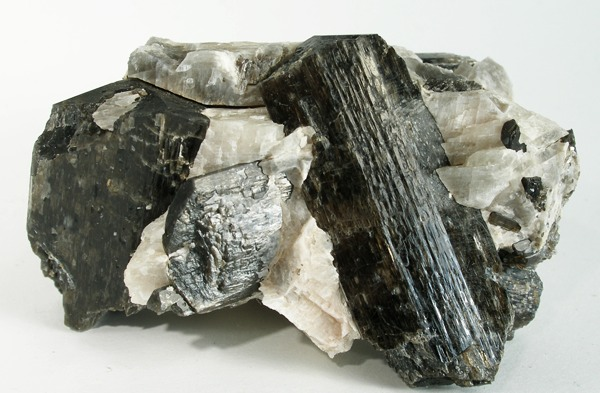
- Fluororichterite with calcite from Wilberforce, Monmouth Township, Haliburton County, Ontario, Canada (size: 6.6 x 4.4 x 3.8 cm)

General
- Category: Silicate mineral
- Formula: Na(NaCa)Mg_{5}Si_{8}O_{22}F_{2}
- IMA symbol: Flrct
- Strunz classification: 9.DE.20
- Crystal system: Monoclinic
- Crystal class: Prismatic (2/m) (same H-M symbol)
- Space group: C2/m
- Unit cell: a = 9.763, b = 17.89 c = 5.122 [Å]; β = 102.25°; Z = 2

Identification
- Color: Brown to brownish-red, rose-red, yellow, grey-brown, also pale to dark green
- Mohs scale hardness: 5–6
- Luster: Vitreous
- Streak: White
- Specific gravity: 3.17

Fluororichterite is a rare amphibole with formula Na(NaCa)Mg_{5}Si_{8}O_{22}F_{2}.

== Occurrence ==
Fluororichterite was first reported from the Ilmen Nature Reserve, Ilmen Mountains, Chelyabinsk Oblast', Southern Urals, Russia. It was recognized by the International Mineralogical Association in 1994. Its name is derived from its fluorine content and relation to richterite.

At the type locality in the Ilmen Mountains fluororichterite occurs in carbonate veins in amphibolites and ultramafic rocks. In the Essonville occurrence in Wilberforce, Ontario it occurs in a limestone lens within a gneiss and is associated with phlogopite and calcite. It has also been reported from Austria, Germany, Italy, Spain and China. At Coyote Peak in the Coastal Range, Humboldt County, California, it occurs with a variety of rare minerals in an alkaline mafic diatreme.
