= Esseneite =

Relatively rare mineral of the pyroxene group

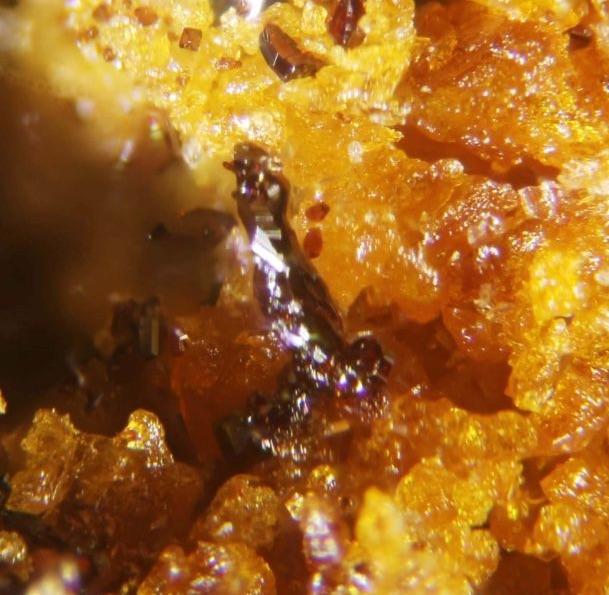
- Reddish-brown dorrite crystals associated to orange essenite, and also spinel and magnesioferrite. From: Chelyabinsk, Chelyabinsk Oblast, Russian Federation

General
- Category: Inosilicate minerals (single chain)
- Group: Pyroxene group, clinopyroxene subgroup
- Formula: CaFeAlSiO_{6}
- Crystal class: Monoclinic – prismatic

Identification
- Color: Reddish brown
- Cleavage: 110 – Perfect
- Luster: Vitreous (glassy)
- Streak: White
- Diaphaneity: Transparent
- Density: 3.54

Esseneite is a relatively rare mineral of the pyroxene group, with formula CaFeAlSiO_{6}. It is the ferric-iron-dominant member. Esseneite is an iron-analogue of other pyroxene-group members, davisite, grossmanite, and kushiroite. It is a metamorphic mineral forming in pyrometamorphic rocks called paralavas, which are formed due to fusing on sedimentary rocks usually in result of coal fires. Esseneite is found in both natural and anthropogenic coal-fire sites.

Esseneite was named for Eric J. Essene (1939–2011), a metamorphic petrologist and Professor of Geosciences at the University of Michigan.

The mineral crystallizes in the monoclinic crystal system with space group C2/c.
