= Gismondine =

Zeolite mineral

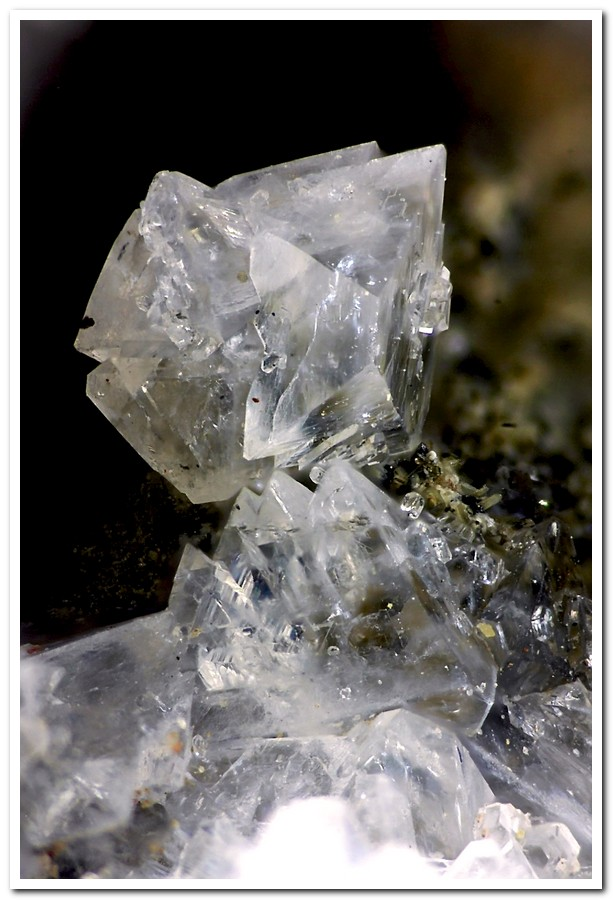
- Gismondine, Campo de Calatrava, Ciudad Real, Spain

General
- Category: Tectosilicate minerals
- Group: Zeolite group
- Formula: CaAl_{2}Si_{2}O_{8}·4H_{2}O
- Dana classification: 77.1.3.1
- Crystal system: Monoclinic
- Crystal class: Prismatic (2/m) (same H-M symbol)
- Space group: P2_{1}/n

Gismondine is a mineral with the chemical formula CaAl_{2}Si_{2}O_{8}·4H_{2}O. It is a zeolite or hydrated aluminosilicate. It forms colorless, bipyramidal crystals of orthorhombic symmetry.

Gismondine was named for Italian mineralogist Carlo Giuseppe Gismondi (1762–1824). It has been found in Iceland, Ireland, and Italy.
