= Parthéite =

Zeolite mineral

Partheite
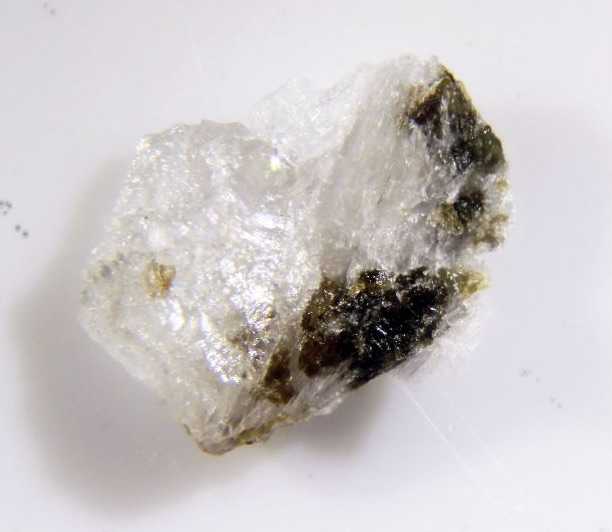

General
- Category: Tectosilicate minerals
- Group: Zeolite group
- Formula: Ca_{2}Al_{4}Si_{4}O_{15}(OH)_{2}·4H_{2}O
- IMA symbol: Pth
- Strunz classification: 9.GB.35
- Crystal system: Monoclinic
- Crystal class: Prismatic (2/m) (same H-M symbol)
- Space group: C2/c

Identification
- Color: White, colorless
- Crystal habit: Fibrous, radial
- Cleavage: {100} and {110}
- Mohs scale hardness: 4
- Luster: vitreous
- Streak: white
- Specific gravity: 2.39 – 2.45
- Optical properties: Biaxial (+)
- Refractive index: nα = 1.547 – 1.550 nβ = 1.549 – 1.552 nγ = 1.559 – 1.565
- Birefringence: δ = 0.012 – 0.015

Partheite or parthéite is a calcium aluminium silicate and a member of the zeolite group of minerals, a group of silicates with large open channels throughout the crystal structure, which allow passage of liquids and gasses through the mineral. It was first discovered in 1979 in rodingitic dikes in an ophiolite zone of the Taurus Mountains in southwest Turkey. The second discovery occurred in gabbro-pegmatites in the Ural Mountains, Russia. Since its discovery and naming, the chemical formula for partheite has been revised from CaAl_{2}Si_{2}O_{8}·2H_{2}O to include not only water but hydroxyl groups as well. The framework of the mineral is interrupted due to these hydroxyl groups attaching themselves to aluminum centered oxygen tetrahedra. This type of interrupted framework is known in only one other zeolite, the mineral roggianite. As a silicate based mineral with the properties of a zeolite, partheite was first described as zeolite-like in 1984 and listed as a zeolite in 1985. Partheite and lawsonite are polymorphs. Associated minerals include prehnite, thomsonite, augite, chlorite and tremolite.

== Composition ==
Partheite is a calcium alumino-silicate with the chemical formula Ca_{2}Al_{4}Si_{4}O_{15}(OH)_{2}∙4(H_{2}O). This is a revised version of the formula reported initially as CaAl_{2}Si_{2}O_{8}·2(H_{2}O) that was determined using electron microprobe analysis. A new formula was necessary after structural analysis revealed the presence of hydroxyl groups in the structure. This new formula fell within the error limits of the initial electron microprobe analysis performed after the mineral was discovered in 1979. Zeolites have alkali or alkai-earth ions bonded to the main alumino-silicate framework, as well as water molecules that take extra-framework spaces. Partheite is different from most zeolites in that it contains the extra hydroxide ions, but is still considered a zeolite by the Subcommittee on Zeolites of the International Mineralogical Association.

== Structure ==
Partheite's crystal system is monoclinic with class 2/m and space group C2/c. It is structured with oxygen surrounding both the aluminum and silicon atoms in tetrahedral formation. These oxygen and aluminum tetrahedra connect by their corners. It is a sorosilicate because two silicate tetrahedra connect at their corners and an aluminum tetrahedra is then attached to each end forming a zig-zag structure. Every second aluminum tetrahedron is attached to a hydroxide ion and the structure is interrupted. The oxygen tetrahedra connect in ladder-like chains to form large 10-membered rings as well as 8-membered, 6-membered, and two types of 4-membered rings. The calcium atoms and water molecules cross through the structure parallel to the c axis and sit in large channels created by the linked aluminum and silicon tetrahedral ringed structure, the main property of zeolites that allow for their absorption and dehydration abilities.

== Physical properties ==
Partheite's habit is fibrous and radial and is rarely found in distinct crystals. Depending on where it is found, partheite can have transparent a white color or dark blue color but has a white streak regardless of which specimen is used. It has a vitreous luster and cleavage plains at {100} {110} {010} with a hardness of 4 on the Mohs scale. Its space group is C2/c with a = 21.59(3), b = 8.78(1), c = 9.31(2) Å. β = 91.55(2) and Z = 4. The mineral has not yet been found to twin.

== Geologic occurrence ==
Partheite was first found in rodingitic veins along with prehnite, thomsonite, and augite in the Taurus Mountains in Doganbaba, Turkey in an ophiolite zone. It has also been found in gabbro-pegmatite in Denezhkin Kamen, Urals, in what is now the Russian Federation. Partheite's crystallization is associated with the process of rodingitisation. Rodingites refer to garnetized gabbros.

== Naming ==
The namesake of partheite is Erwin Parthé (1928–2006), Professeur Honoraire at the University of Geneva and Honorarprofessor für Strukturchemie at the University of Vienna. After completing his studies in chemistry at the University of Vienna, the Austrian born crystallographer went on to teach and conduct research in crystal chemistry for the next 52 years until just before his death in 2006. In 1991, the American Minerals, Metals & Materials Society presented him with the William Hume-Rothery Award. At the time of partheite's discovery and naming, Parthé was Professor of the "Laboratoire de Cristallopgraphie aux rayons X" at the University of Geneva, Switzerland.

== See also ==
- List of minerals
- List of minerals named after people
