= Grossmanite =

Rare pyroxene mineral

General
- Category: Inosilicate minerals (single chain)
- Group: Pyroxene group, clinopyroxene subgroup
- Formula: CaTi3+AlSiO6

Grossmanite is a very rare mineral of the pyroxene group, with formula CaTi^{3+}AlSiO_{6}. It is the titanium-dominant member. Grossmanite is unique in being a mineral with trivalent titanium, a feature shared with tistarite, Ti_{2}O_{3}. Titanium in minerals is almost exclusively tetravalent. Grossmanite stands for titanium-analogue of davisite, esseneite and kushiroite – other members of the pyroxene group. Both grossmanite and tistarite come from the famous Allende meteorite.
