= Khmaralite =

General
- Category: Inosilicates; Sapphrine supergroup
- Formula: (Mg,Al,Fe)_{16}[(Al,Si,Be)_{12}O_{36}]O_{40}
- IMA symbol: Kma
- Strunz classification: 9.DH.50
- Crystal system: Monoclinic
- Crystal class: Prismatic (2/m) (same H-M symbol)
- Space group: P2_{1}/b
- Unit cell: a = 18.8, b = 14.371 c = 11.254 [Å], β = 125.53°, Z = 4

Identification
- Color: Dark greenish blue or dark green
- Crystal habit: Foliated, tabular, or made of many habits
- Twinning: None
- Cleavage: None
- Fracture: Brittle (Uneven) Very brittle fracture producing uneven fragments
- Mohs scale hardness: 7
- Luster: Vitreous
- Streak: Green-grey
- Diaphaneity: Transparent
- Specific gravity: 3.76
- Optical properties: Biaxial (-), a=1.725, b=1.74, g=1.741
- Birefringence: δ = 0.016
- Pleochroism: NA
- 2V angle: Measured: 34° , Calculated: 28°
- Dispersion: r > v, very strong
- Other characteristics: No information on health risks for this material has been entered into the database. Mineral specimens should always be treated with care.

The mineral khmaralite is a beryllium bearing mineral of the sapphirine group with a chemical formula of (Mg,Al,Fe)_{16}[(Al,Si,Be)_{12}O_{36}]O_{40}. It is most associated with sillimanite, surinamite, musgravite, garnet, and biotite. The known color is a dark greenish blue or a dark green, with a colorless streak. It is transparent with a vitreous luster with no cleavage and a Moh's hardness of 7. It is brittle with an uneven fracture. The calculated density is 3.61 g/cm^{3}.

Khmaralite is closely related to sapphirine with a difference in the tetrahedral sequence chain. The tetrahedral sequence chain in sapphirine (Al-Si-Al) is replaced by the sequence Si-Be-Si in khmaralite. Si is replaced by Be on two sites, and Al is replaced by Si on four adjacent sites. This creates an indirect replacement of Al by Be.

== Occurrence ==
Khmaralite was found in "Zircon Point" on Khmara Bay, Enderby Land, Antarctica and occurs in a metamorphosed pegmatite. It is named after the area that it was found, which was named in the honor of Ivan Fedorovich Khmara who was a tractor driver that died in Antarctica.

The associated minerals with khamralite (sillimanite, surinamite, musgravite, garnet, and biotite) saturated it in BeO, allowing the BeO content to be close to the maximum possible. This is a rare instance, and has not been located elsewhere.

== Chemical composition ==
Barbier et al. analyzed khmaralite for constituents other than Li, Be and B with an ARL-EMX electron microprobe using 15 kV accelerating voltage and a 20 nA sample current. Li, Be and B were analyzed with an ARL Ion Microprobe Mass Analyzer (IMMA). It was later found in 1996 while using a Camea ims 4f (Secondary Ion Mass Spectroscopy or SIMS) that the ^{9}Be^{+} signal was not corrected for the ^{27}Al^{+} signal in the IMMA data. The IMMA and SIMS BeO contents are respectively, 2.56 and 2.47 weight percent.

== Chemical composition by weight percent ==
Compound	Weight %
SiO_{2}	20.27
Al_{2}O_{3}	51.15
Cr_{2}O_{3}	0.01
Fe_{2}O_{3}*	.70
FeO*	9.43
FeO*	10.06
MnO	0.01
MgO	15.49
ZnO	0.10
CaO	0.16
K_{2}O	0.03
Na_{2}O	0
Li2O‡	~0.01
BeO	2.51
B_{2}O_{3}	0.05
Total	99.76

(*Fe was analyzed as Fe^{2+}; FeO and Fe_{2}O_{3} were calculated assuming 28 cations in a formula for 40 O atoms.)

== Crystallography ==
Khmaralite has a superstructure that is best described as a doubled sapphirine unit cell because the a axis is in the direction of the tetrahedral chains along which the main cation ordering occurs.

There are rows of weak extra reflections that correspond to a doubling of the a axis. These patterns are indexed by the unit cell (P2_{1}/c): a = 19.8, b = 14.4, c = 11.2 Å, β = 125°. These were found using electron diffraction and microscopy. The superstructure was also observed in a medium-resolution lattice along the [001] axis. There was also a slight comparison made between the superstructure and the thicker regions of the crystals corresponding to a double_{100} interplanar spacing equal to 16.1 Å.

The powdered x-ray diffraction pattern had a slightly different conclusion but relatively the same as the electron diffraction and microscopy end numbers. The powder pattern was indexed on a monoclinic unit cell and the absences consistent with the P2_{1}/c space group were found. The unit cell was similar to the electron diffraction and microscopy: a = 19.794(8), b = 14.367(5), c = 11.320(3) Å, β = 125.49(4)°. But there was an unexplained 0.066 Å difference in the c parameters. The reflections that correspond to the 2xa superstructure are not visible in the powder x-ray pattern of khmaralite. The intensity of the strongest super-cell reflection is only 0.4% of that of the most intense sub-cell reflection.

These experiments were then refined, and corrected displaying the notable 2xa superstructure of khmaralite.

== Distinguishing from sapphirine-2M ==
The major differences between khmaralite and sapphirine-2M are the presence of a 2xa superstructure and the larger count of Be at one tetrahedral site. Khmaralite and sapphirine-2M cannot be distinguished by optical properties alone because the internal effects of Be on the crystal structure are covered by the effect of Fe substitution for Mg and Al. But the presence of 2 wt% or more of BeO indicates a likely advocate for khmaralite. Confirmation is available by using electron diffraction to see if there is a presence of a superstructure.
