= Homilite =

Borosilicate mineral

General
- Category: Nesosilicate
- Formula: Ca_{2}(Fe^{2+},Mg)B_{2}Si_{2}O_{10}
- IMA symbol: Hom
- Strunz classification: 8/B.29-30
- Crystal system: Monoclinic
- Crystal class: Prismatic (2/m)
- Space group: P2_{1}/b
- Unit cell: a = 9.78 Å, b = 7.61 Å, c = 4.78 Å; β = 90.56°; Z = ?

Identification
- Color: Greenish to brownish black
- Mohs scale hardness: 5–5 1/2
- Luster: Vitreous, resinous
- Diaphaneity: Opaque
- Specific gravity: 3.34
- Optical properties: Biaxial (+)
- Refractive index: n_{α} = 1.715 n_{β} = 1.725 n_{γ} = 1.738
- Birefringence: δ =
- 2V angle: Measured: 80°

Homilite is a borosilicate mineral belonging to the gadolinite group of minerals with formula Ca_{2}(Fe,Mg)B_{2}Si_{2}O_{10}.

It occurs as brown monoclinic crystals (space group P2_{1}/a) within feldspar masses in pegmatite and was discovered in 1876 in Stoko island, Langesundfiord, Norway. The name is from the Greek for to occur together, in allusion to its association with meliphanite and allanite.
