= Malayaite =

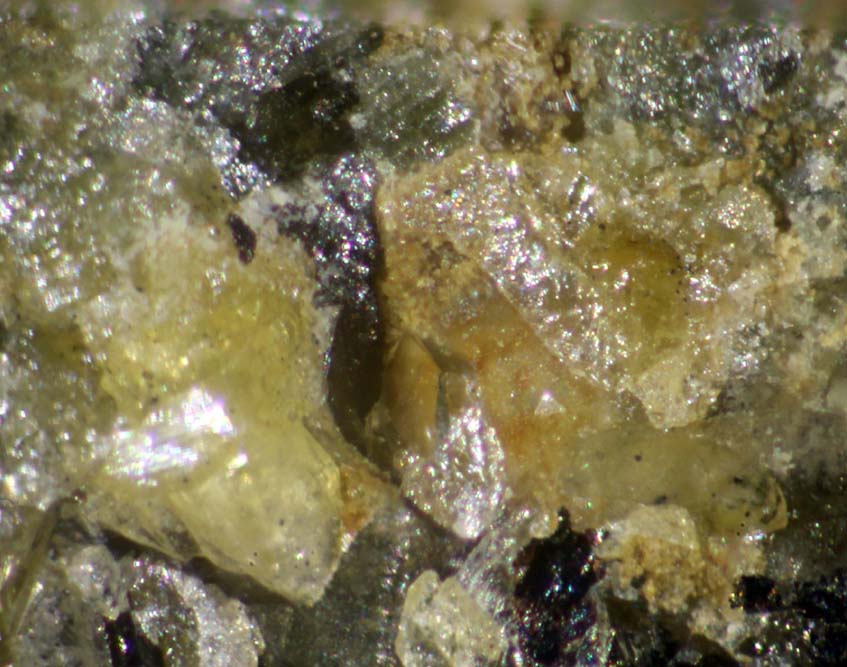
- Malayaite found in the United Kingdom

General
- Category: Silicate mineral
- Formula: CaSnO[SiO_{4}]
- IMA symbol: Mly
- Strunz classification: 9.AG.15
- Crystal system: Monoclinic
- Crystal class: Prismatic (2/m) (same H-M symbol)
- Space group: A2/a
- Unit cell: a = 7.15 Å, b = 8.90 Å, c = 6.67 Å; β = 113.4°; V = 389.50 Å^{3}; Z = 4

Identification
- Formula mass: 266.87 g/mol
- Color: Colorless, greenish gray, white, light yellow, orange
- Crystal habit: Massive or wedge shaped
- Mohs scale hardness: 3.5 - 4
- Luster: Vitreous or resinuous
- Streak: White
- Diaphaneity: Translucent
- Specific gravity: 4.3 - 4.55
- Optical properties: Biaxial (-)
- Refractive index: n_{α} = 1.765 n_{β} = 1.784 n_{γ} = 1.799
- Birefringence: δ=0.0340-0.0350
- Pleochroism: x=colorless, y=colorless, z = pale yellow
- Other characteristics: Fluorescent, Short UV = bright yellowish green

Malayaite is a calcium tin silicate mineral with formula CaSnOSiO_{4}. It is a member of the titanite group.

== Discovery ==
Malayaite was originally found in Perak (a state in Malaysia) and was first described in literature in 1961, though it was not yet given a name. In 1965, the mineral was named and recognized by the International Mineralogical Association. It was named for the locality in which it was discovered; which is the Malay Peninsula in Malaysia.

== Crystal structure and symmetry ==
This mineral is classified under the nesosilicate group for silicate minerals because the titanite group falls under this category as well. Minerals in the nesosilicate group have isolated SiO_{4} tetrahedra connected to cations. In malayaite, the tetrahedra are connected to the chain of distorted SnO_{6} octahedra, in which the octahedra are linked by vertex [trans corners] sharing and form chains parallel to the miller index of [100]. Within the SnO_{6}-SiO_{4} framework, the CaO_{7} polyhedra form chains parallel to [101].

Malayaite belongs to the monoclinic crystal system and has a 2/m (prismatic) crystal class. According to the Hermann–Mauguin notation, the '2' refers to the two-fold axis while the 'm' refers to the presence of a single mirror plane. The '/' symbol indicates that the twofold axis is perpendicular to the mirror plane.

The space group for malayaite is A2/a. According to the Bravais lattice symbol, 'A' refers to single face centering of the motif. This means that there is one more point on the center of one face. '2' refers to the two-fold rotation axis while the '/' indicates that a mirror plane is perpendicular to the a-axis, which is the last symbol on that space group notation.

== Optical properties ==
Malayaite exhibits anisotropy so it is doubly refractive and breaks up the light that travels through it into two distinct rays of different speeds. This mineral is known to have very high optical relief and has three indices of refraction. Since it is a monoclinic mineral, Malayaite exhibits two different colors under plane polarized light making it a pleochroic mineral. Malayaite is biaxial birefringent (trirefringent).

== Functions and purposes ==
Malayaite has excellent thermal properties and stability making its host lattice ideal for ceramic pigmentation unlike its analogous mineral, titanite that undergoes phase transition at a higher temperature. This makes chromium-doped malayaite very desirable as it provides a consistent pigment for ceramics. Malayaite contains the element tin which is sometimes doped with chromium or nickel. These chromophore elements allow the mineral to produce different pigmentation. If malayaite is chromium-doped, it produces a pink-red color while with nickel, it produces a purple color. Pink chromium-doped malayaite Ca(Sn,Cr)SiO_{5} is among a few important minerals used in producing pigments for the ceramic industry, specifically for coloring glazes as it produces a resilient color.

== Occurrence ==
This mineral is generally found in tin-rich contact metamorphic skarn deposits. There is a possibility that malayaite is a hydrothermal altered form of cassiterite-quartz assemblage or some tin-bearing mineral. There have been specimens that were found with malayaite as a coating mineral on cassiterite.
