= Zircophyllite =

General
- Category: Inosilicate
- Formula: (K,Na)_{3}(Mn,Fe^{2+})_{7}(Zr,Ti)_{2}Si_{8}O_{24}(O,OH,F)_{7}
- IMA symbol: Zcp
- Strunz classification: 9.DC.05
- Dana classification: 69.1.1.5
- Crystal system: Triclinic
- Crystal class: Pinacoidal (1̅) (same H-M symbol)
- Space group: P1̅

Identification
- Color: Black-brown
- Crystal habit: Platy, micaceous
- Cleavage: Perfect on {001}
- Fracture: Brittle
- Tenacity: Brittle
- Mohs scale hardness: 4 – 4.5
- Luster: Adamantine, vitreous
- Streak: Light brown
- Diaphaneity: Translucent to opaque
- Specific gravity: 3.34
- Optical properties: Biaxial (−)
- Refractive index: nα = 1.708 nβ = 1.738 nγ = 1.747
- Birefringence: δ = 0.039
- Pleochroism: X = Y = dark yellow; Z = brown
- 2V angle: Measured: 62°, calculated: 56°
- Common impurities: Hf,H_{2}O

Zircophyllite is a complex mineral, formula (K,Na)_{3}(Mn,Fe)^{2+}_{7}(Zr,Ti,Nb)_{2}Si_{8}O_{24}(OH,F)_{7}. It crystallizes in the triclinic – pinacoidal crystal class as dark brown to black micaceous plates. It has perfect 001 cleavage, a Mohs hardness of 4 to 4.5 and a specific gravity of 3.34. Its indices of refraction are nα=1.708 nβ=1.738 nγ=1.747 and it has a 2V optical angle of 62°.

It occurs with natrolite in alkali pegmatites. It was discovered in 1972 in the Korgeredabinsh massif, Tuva, Russia and is named for its zirconium content and its relationship to astrophyllite. It is also known from the Mont Saint-Hilaire intrusive complex of Québec, Canada.

Zircophyllite is radioactive, but the radioactivity is barely detectable.
