= Hsianghualite =

Zeolite mineral

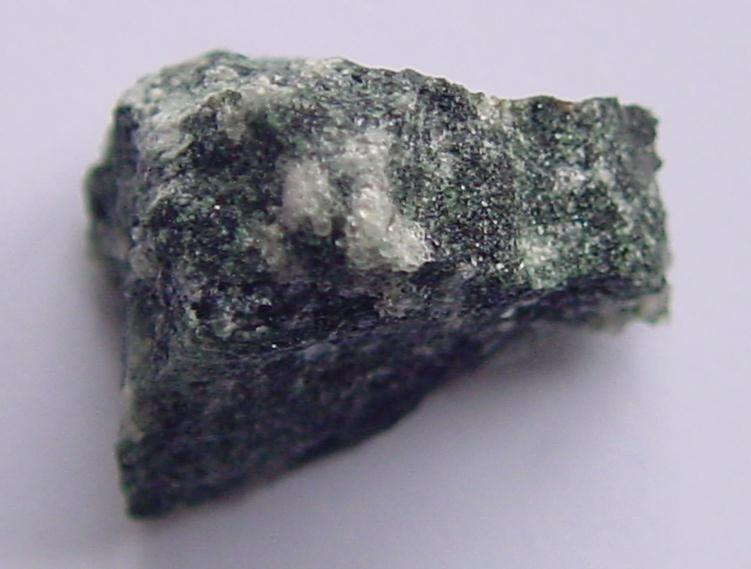
- Hsianghualite from the type locality. Specimen size 1.5 cm

General
- Category: Tectosilicate minerals
- Group: Zeolite group
- Formula: Ca_{3}Li_{2}(Be_{3}Si_{3}O_{12})F_{2}
- IMA symbol: Hsi
- Strunz classification: 9.GB.05 (10 ed); 8/J.16-10 (8 ed)
- Dana classification: 77.1.1.5
- Crystal system: Isometric
- Crystal class: Tetartoidal (23); H-M symbol: (23)
- Space group: I2_{1}3, originally reported as 4 3 2

Identification
- Formula mass: 475.4 g/mol
- Color: White or colorless
- Crystal habit: trisoctahedral or dodecahedral crystals or granular masses
- Cleavage: None
- Tenacity: Brittle
- Mohs scale hardness: 6.5
- Luster: Vitreous
- Streak: White
- Diaphaneity: Transparent to translucent
- Specific gravity: 2.97 to 3.00, measured
- Refractive index: n = 1.6132

Hsianghualite is a tectosilicate (framework silicate) of lithium, calcium and beryllium, with fluorine, a member of the zeolite group. It was discovered in 1958 and named for the type locality, Hsiang Hua, 香花, meaning fragrant flower.

== Structure ==
Structure is analogous to that of analcime with Be and Si in tetrahedral co-ordination forming a three-dimensional framework. Its space group is I2_{1}3 (Previously reported as I4_{1}32). Unit cell parameters are a = 12.879 or 12.897, and Z = 8.

== Environment ==
It occurs within phlogopite veins in the light-coloured band of green and white banded metamorphosed Devonian limestone which has been intruded by beryllium-bearing granite. Associated mineral include fluorite, liberite, chrysoberyl, taaffeite and nigerite.

== Localities ==
Hsianghualite has been found only at the type locality, the Xianghualing Mine in Linwu County, Hunan Province, China.
