= Kushiroite =

Pyroxene, inosilicate mineral

General
- Category: Inosilicate minerals (single chain)
- Group: Pyroxene group, clinopyroxene subgroup
- Formula: CaAlAlSiO_{6}
- IMA symbol: Ks

Kushiroite is a rare mineral of the pyroxene group, with formula CaAlAlSiO_{6}. It is the fully aluminian member. The formula of kushiroite corresponds to the molecule (or component) known as Calcium-Tschermak (Ca-Tschermak), which dominates in the composition of kushiroite. Kushiroite is an aluminium-analogue of other pyroxene-group members, davisite, esseneite, and grossmanite. It was found in a chondrite meteorite within refractory inclusions.

The mineral crystallizes in the monoclinic crystal system (space group C2/c).
