= Sudoite =

Mineral of the chlorite group

General
- Category: Phyllosilicate minerals
- Group: Chlorite group
- Formula: Mg_{2}Al_{3}(Si_{3}Al)O_{10}(OH)_{8}
- Crystal system: Monoclinic

Identification
- Color: White to light green
- Mohs scale hardness: 2.5–3.5
- Luster: pearly, dull
- Refractive index: n_{α} = 1.581 à 1.583 n_{β} = 1.584 à 1.589 n_{γ} = 1.591 à 1.601
- Birefringence: biaxial (-) ; δ = 0.010 to 0.018; 2V = 64 to 70° (measured); 2V = 68 to 72° (calculated)

Sudoite is a mineral from the chlorite group. It was named after Toshio Sudo (1911–2000), professor of mineralogy at the University of Tokyo, in Japan, and a pioneer of clay science. The mineral tosudite also bears his name. It was approved as a valid species by the International Mineralogical Association in 1966.

== Characteristics ==
Sudoite is a clay mineral with chemical formula defined as Mg_{2}Al_{3}(Si_{3}Al)O_{10}(OH)_{8}. It has a monoclinic crystal system. Its hardness on the Mohs scale is between 2.5 and 3.5.

== Classification ==
Following the Nickel–Strunz classification, it is contained in the "09.EC.55" group:

Members of the 9.EC.55 group
| Mineral | Formula | Symmetry group | Space group |
|---|---|---|---|
| Baileychlore | (Zn,Al)_{3}[Fe_{2}Al][Si_{3}AlO_{10}](OH)_{8} | 1 or 1̅ | C1 or C1̅ |
| Borocookeite | Li_{1+3x}Al_{4-x}(BSi_{3})O_{10}(OH,F)_{8} (x ≤ 0,33) | 2/m | C2/m |
| Chamosite | (Fe,Mg,Fe)_{5}Al(Si_{3}Al)O_{10}(OH,O)_{8} | 2/m | C2/m |
| Clinochlore | (Mg,Fe)_{5}Al(Si_{3}Al)O_{10}(OH)_{8} | 2/m | C2/m |
| Cookeite | LiAl_{4}(Si_{3}Al)O_{10}(OH)_{8} | 1̅, 2 or 2/m | C1̅, C2 or Cc |
| Donbassite | Al_{2}[Al_{2,33}][Si_{3}AlO_{10}](OH)_{8} | 2/m | C2/m |
| Franklinfurnaceite | Ca(Fe,Al)Mn_{4}Zn_{2}Si_{2}O_{10}(OH)_{8} | 2 | C2 |
| Glagolevite | NaMg_{6}[Si_{3}AlO_{10}](OH,O)_{8}·H_{2}O | 1 | C1 |
| Gonyerite | Mn_{3}[Mn_{3}Fe][(Si,Fe)_{4}O_{10}](OH,O)_{8} | | unknown |
| Nimite | (Ni,Mg,Fe)_{5}Al(Si_{3}Al)O_{10}(OH)_{8} | 2/m | C2/m |
| Odinite | (Fe,Mg,Al,Fe,Ti,Mn)_{2,5}(Si,Al)_{2}O_{5}(OH)_{4} | m | Cm |
| Orthochamosite | (Fe,Mg,Fe)_{5}Al(Si_{3}Al)O_{10}(OH,O)_{8} | | unknown |
| Pennantite | Mn_{5}Al(Si_{3}Al)O_{10}(OH)_{8} | 2/m | C2/m |
| Sudoite | Mg_{2}(Al,Fe)_{3}Si_{3}AlO_{10}(OH)_{8} | 2/m | C2/m |

== Formation ==
It has been first discovered in the Knollenberg Keuper formation, in the village of Plochingen, Stuttgart Region (Baden-Württemberg, Germany). Despite being an unlikely mineral, it has been described in every continent but Antarctica and Oceania. It is found mainly in hydrothermal or high-pressure/low-temperature (HP/LT) metamorphism contexts

== Use ==
This mineral has been used as gemstone for the production of personal ornaments, beads and pendants, during the Early Ceramic Age (500 BC – 500 AD), in the Lesser Antilles. The precise source of such formation of sudoite allowing to carve artifacts in rather large blocks remain unknown.
