= Chloritoid =

Silicate mineral

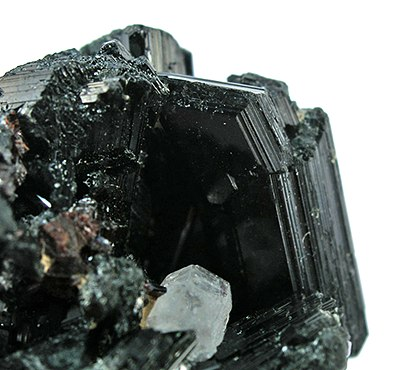
- Chloritoid crystal group on matrix from Nuristan Province, Afghanistan (size:6.3 x 3.5 x 3.0 cm)

General
- Category: Nesosilicates
- Formula: (Fe,Mg,Mn)_{2}Al_{4}Si_{2}O_{10}(OH)_{4}
- IMA symbol: Cld
- Strunz classification: 9.AF.85
- Dana classification: 52.03.03.01
- Crystal system: 1A polytype: triclinic 2M polytype: monoclinic
- Crystal class: 1A polytype: pinacoidal (1̅); 2M polytype: prismatic (2/m)
- Unit cell: 1A polytype: a = 9.46 Å, b = 5.50 Å, c = 9.15 Å; α = 97.05°, β = 101.56°, γ = 90.10° 2M polytype: a = 9.50 Å, b = 5.50 Å, c = 18.22 Å; β = 101.9°; Z = 4

Identification
- Color: Dark gray, greenish gray, greenish black
- Crystal habit: Tabular pseudohexagonal crystals; rosettes, commonly coarsely foliated with foliae typically curved or bent; also massive
- Twinning: Common on {001}, polysynthetic may be lamellar
- Cleavage: Perfect on {001}, distinct on {110}; parting on {010}
- Tenacity: Brittle
- Mohs scale hardness: 6.5
- Luster: pearly on cleavage surfaces
- Streak: White, grayish, or very slightly greenish
- Diaphaneity: Translucent
- Specific gravity: 3.46 – 3.80
- Optical properties: Biaxial (+) or (−)
- Refractive index: n_{α} = 1.713 – 1.730 n_{β} = 1.719 – 1.734 n_{γ} = 1.723 – 1.740
- Birefringence: δ = 0.010
- Pleochroism: X = olive-green to yellow; Y = grayish blue to blue; Z = colorless to pale greenish yellow
- 2V angle: Measured: 36° to 89°
- Dispersion: r > v; strong

Chloritoid is a silicate mineral of metamorphic origin. It is an iron magnesium manganese alumino-silicate hydroxide with formula (Fe, Mg, Mn)_{2}Al_{4}Si_{2}O_{10}(OH)_{4}. It occurs as greenish grey to black platy micaceous crystals and foliated masses. Its Mohs hardness is 6.5, unusually high for a platy mineral, and it has a specific gravity of 3.52 to 3.57. It typically occurs in phyllites, schists and marbles.

Both monoclinic and triclinic polytypes exist and both are pseudohexagonal.

It was first described in 1837 from localities in the Ural Mountains region of Russia. It was named for its similarity to the chlorite group of minerals.
