= List of minerals recognized by the International Mineralogical Association (H) =

This list includes those recognised minerals beginning with the letter H. The International Mineralogical Association is the international group that recognises new minerals and new mineral names; however, minerals discovered before 1959 did not go through the official naming procedure, although some minerals published previously have been either confirmed or discredited since that date. This list contains a mixture of mineral names that have been approved since 1959 and those mineral names believed to still refer to valid mineral species (these are called "grandfathered" species).

The list is divided into groups:

- Introduction • (Main synonyms)
- A • B • C • D • E • F • G • H • I • J • K • L • M • N • O • P–Q • R • S • T • U–V • W–X • Y–Z

The data was exported from mindat.org on 29 April 2005; updated up to 'IMA2021'.

The minerals are sorted by name, followed by the structural group (rruff.info/ima and ima-cnmnc by mineralienatlas.de, mainly) or chemical class (mindat.org and basics), the year of publication (if it's before of an IMA approval procedure), the IMA approval and the Strunz-mindat code. The first link is to mindat.org, the second link is to webmineral.com, and the third is to the Handbook of Mineralogy (Mineralogical Society of America).

- Abbreviations:
  - ^{D} – discredited (IMA/CNMNC status).
  - ^{Q} – questionable/ doubtful (IMA/CNMNC, mindat.org or mineralienatlas.de status).
  - ^{N} – published without approval of the IMA/CNMNC, or just not an IMA approved mineral but with some acceptance in the scientific community nowadays.
  - ^{I} – intermediate member of a solid-solution series.
  - ^{H} – hypothetical mineral (synthetic, anthropogenic, suspended approval procedure, etc.)
    - ^{ch} – incomplete description, hypothetical solid solution end member.
  - Rd – redefinition of ...
  - "s.p." – special procedure.
  - group – a name used to designate a group of species, sometimes only a mineral group name.
  - no – no link available.
  - IUPAC – chemical name.
  - Y: NNNN – year of publication.
  - Y: old – known before publications were available.

== H ==
=== Ha – He ===
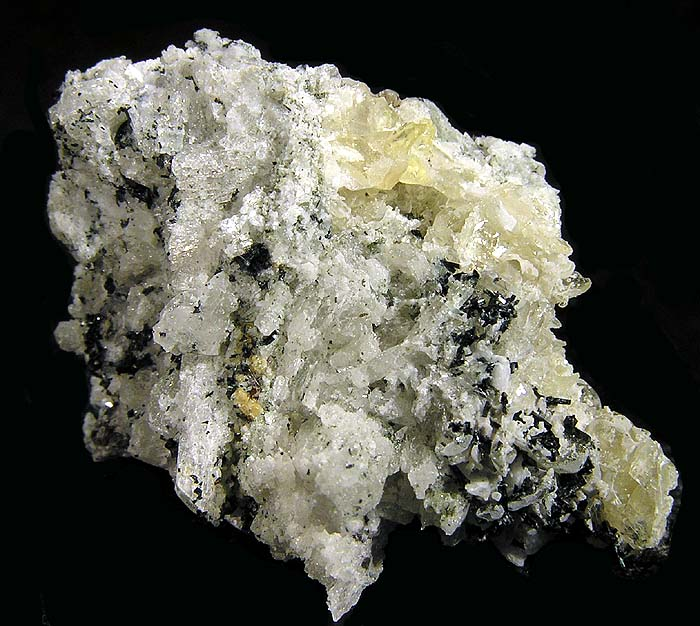
Bright, yellow crystals of haineaultite

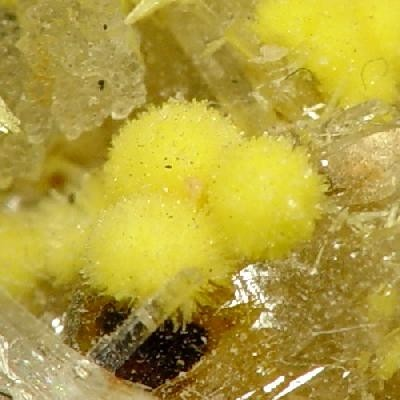
Haiweeite and gypsum, Perus, São Paulo (state), Brazil

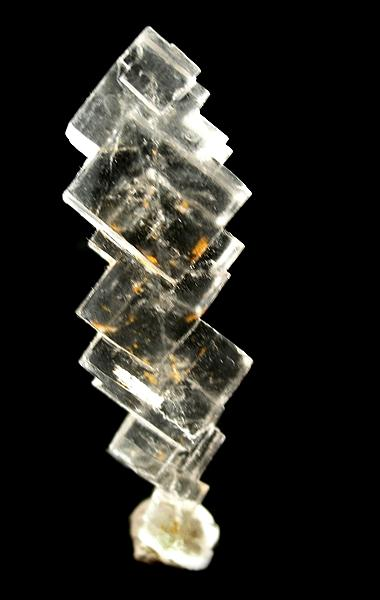
Halite crystal-chain, Stassfurt potash deposit, Saxony-Anhalt, Germany; size: 6.7 × 1.9 × 1.7 cm

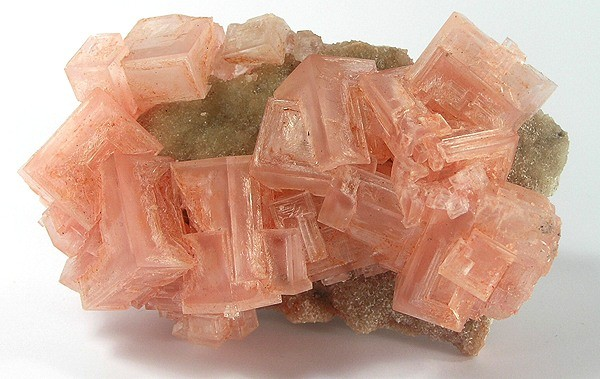
Pink halite crystals from Searles Lake, California, US; size: 8.8 × 4.6 × 4.6 cm

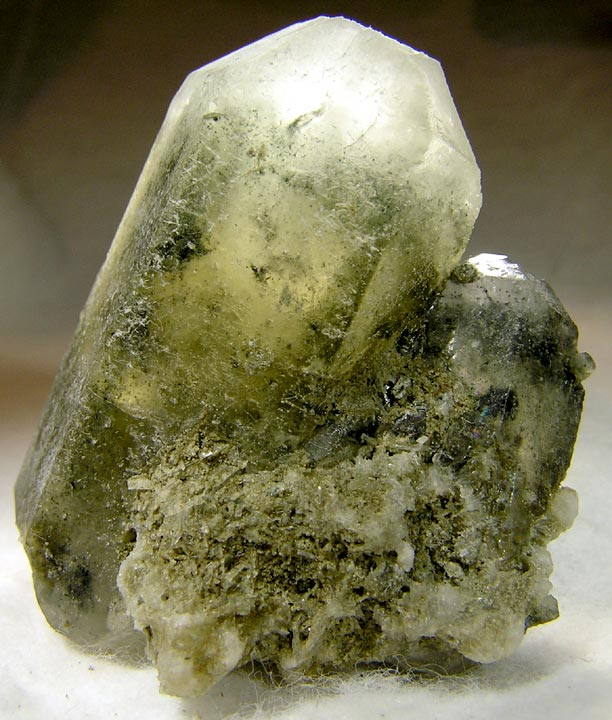
Hanksite from Searles Lake, San Bernardino County, California, USA

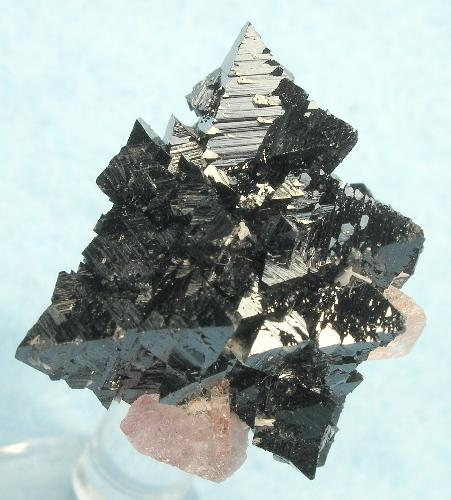
Hausmannite pseudo-octahedrons with pink datolite, Wessels Mine, Kalahari manganese fields, Northern Cape Province, South Africa; size: 2.7 × 2.6 × 1.6 cm

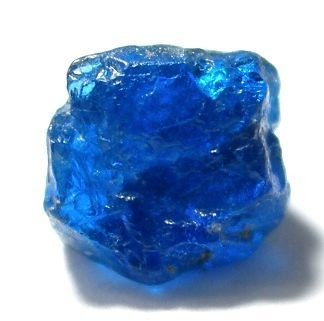
Hauyne from Mayen, Rhineland-Palatinate, Germany; crystal is about 0.5 cm

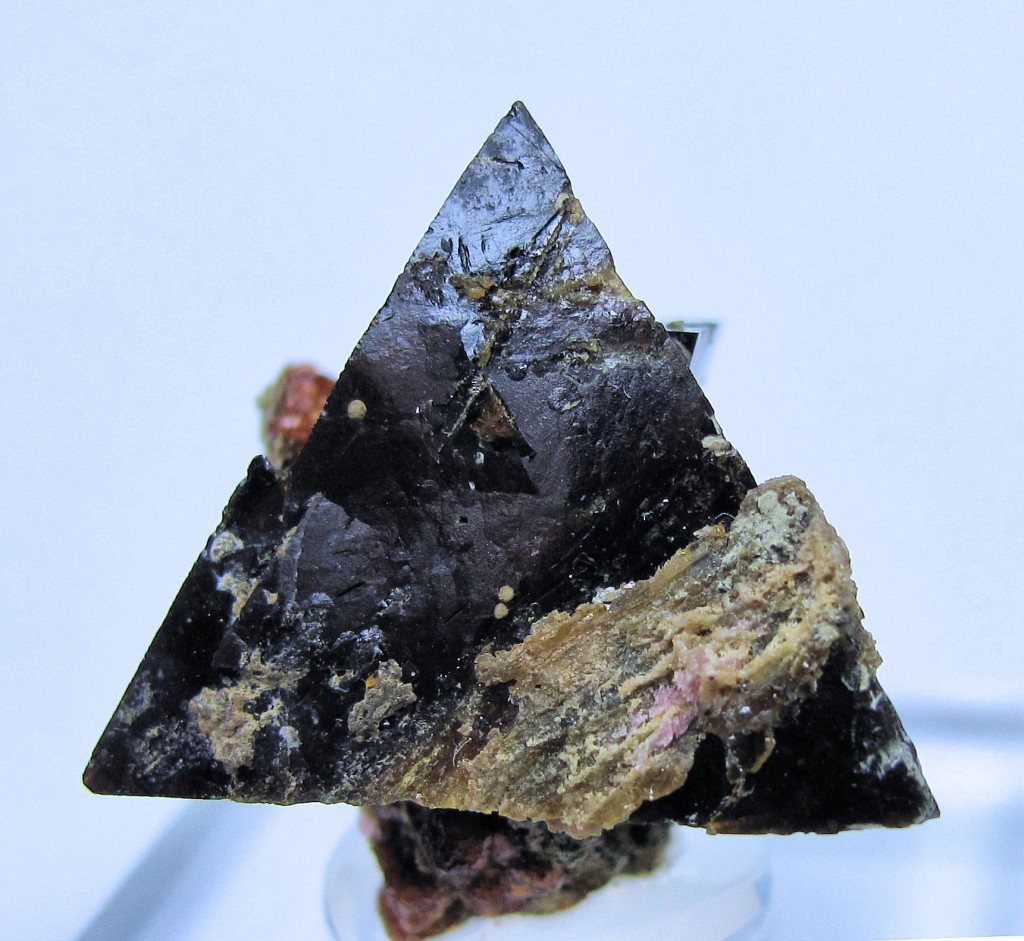
Two intergrown, dark brown color, tetrahedral crystals of helvite, with some small andradite crystals

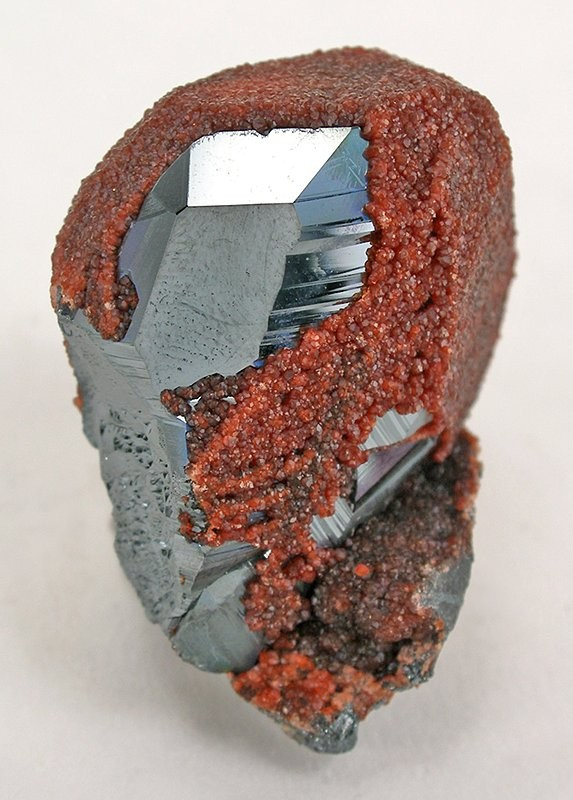
Andradite coating hematite, Wessels Mine, Kalahari manganese fields, Northern Cape Province, South Africa; 4.2 x 2.8 x 2.4 cm

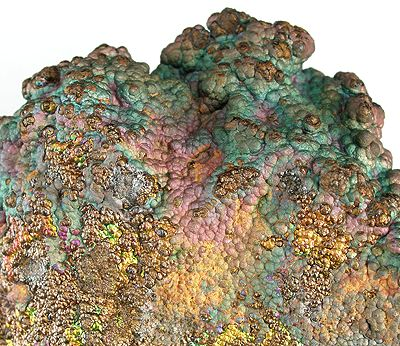
Oxidized botryoidal hematite with a distinctive multi-colored patina, from Crowders Mountain iron prospect near Kings Mountain, North Carolina; size: 19.7 × 14.2 × 6.2 cm

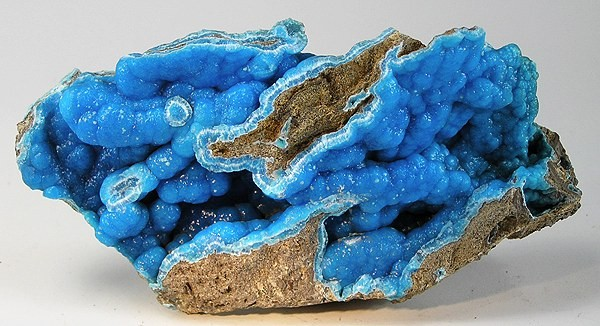
Hemimorphite from Wenshan Mine, Wenshan County, China; size: 12.4 × 6.8 × 3.1 cm

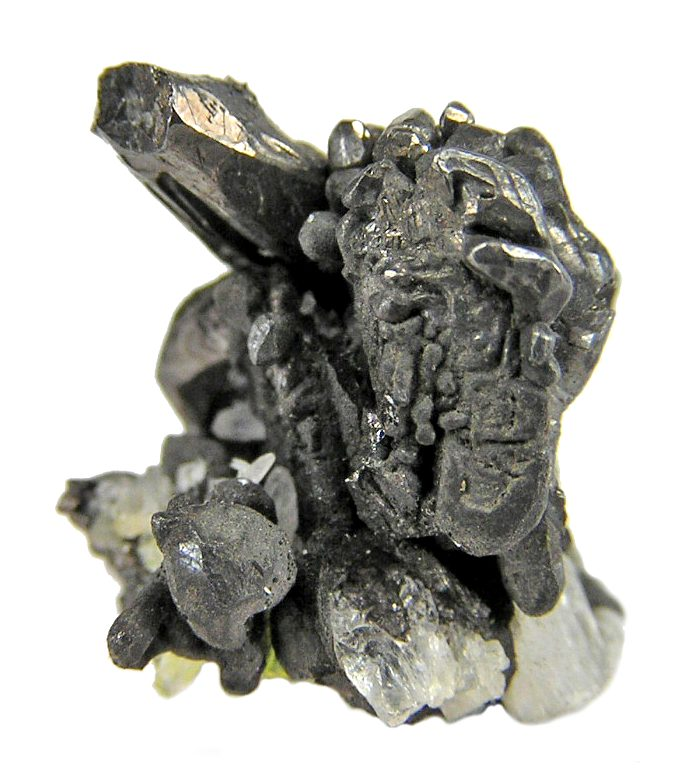
Hessite, gold from Botez, Alba County, Romania

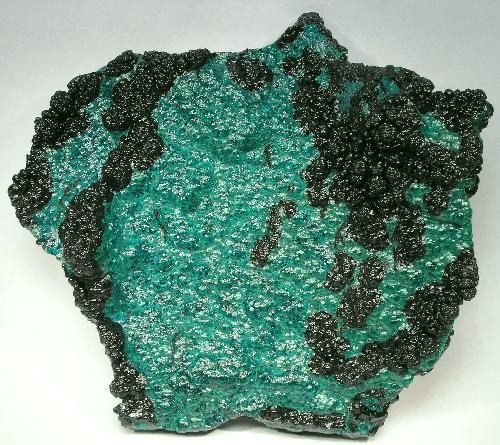
Blue-green botryoidal chrysocolla coating a plate of botryoidal heterogenite, from Kolwezi, old Katanga province, Democratic Republic of Congo; size: 14 × 12.6 × 2.4 cm

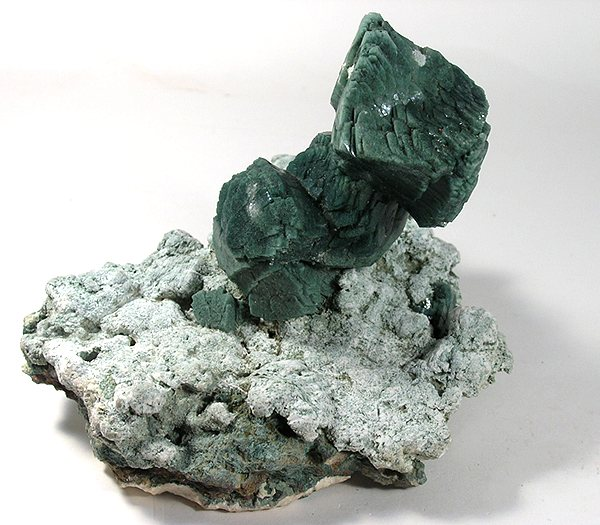
Heulandite included by celadonite

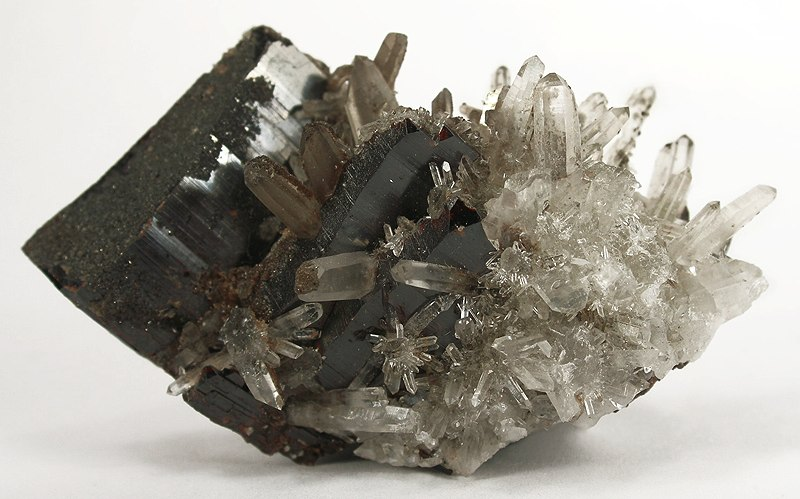
Hübnerite and quartz, from Black Pine Mine, Flint Creek Valley, Philipsburg District, Granite County, Montana, USA

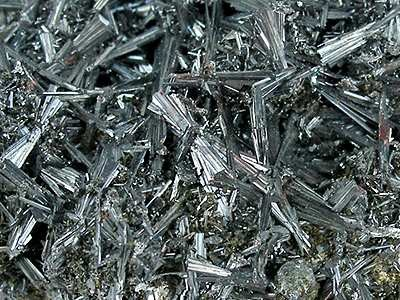
Hutchinsonite from Quiruvilca Mine, Santiago de Chuco Province, Peru

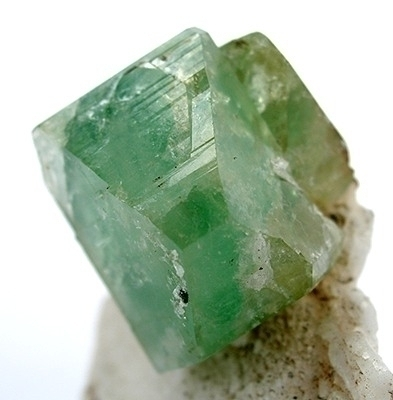
Hydroxylherderite crystal (about 2 cm) on albite, from Chhappu, Skardu District, Gilgit–Baltistan, Pakistan

1. Haapalaite (valleriite: IMA1972-021) 2.FD.30
2. Hafnon (zircon: IMA1974-018) 9.AD.30
  (IUPAC: hafnium tetraoxysilicate)
3. Hagendorfite (alluaudite: 1954) 8.AC.10
  (IUPAC: disodium manganese (iron(II) iron(III)) triphosphate)
4. Haggertyite (magnetoplumbite: IMA1996-054) 4.CC.45
  (IUPAC: barium hexairon pentatitanium magnesium nonadecaoxide)
5. Häggite (Y: 1958) 4.HE.25
  (IUPAC: vanadium(III) vanadium(IV) trihydro dioxide)
6. Hagstromite (IMA2019-093) 7.0 [no] [no]
7. Haidingerite (Y: 1827) 8.CJ.20
  (IUPAC: calcium hydroxoarsenate monohydrate)
8. Haigerachite (IMA1997-049) 8.CF.10
  (IUPAC: potassium triiron(III) hexa(dihydroxophosphate) di(hydroxophosphate) tetrahydrate)
9. Haineaultite (IMA1997-015) 9.DG.50
10. Hainite-(Y) (seidozerite, rinkite: IMA2016 s.p., Y: 1893) 9.BE.22
11. Haitaite-(La) (IMA2019-033a) [no] [no]
12. Haiweeite (IMA1962 s.p., 1959) 9.AK.25
  (IUPAC: calcium diuranyl dodecaoxypentasilicate dihydroxyl hexahydrate)
13. Hakite-(Hg) (tetrahedrite: IMA2018-K, IMA1970-019) 2.GB.05
  (Cu_{6}[Cu_{4}Hg_{2}]Sb_{4}Se_{13})
14. Halamishite (phosphide: IMA2013-105) 1.0 [no] [no]
  (IUPAC: pentanickel tetraphosphide)
15. Håleniusite (fluorite) 3.DE.05
  1. Håleniusite-(La) (fluorite: IMA2003-028) 3.DE.05 [no]
    (IUPAC: lanthanum oxofluoride)
  2. Håleniusite-(Ce) (fluorite: IMA2021-042) 3.DE.05 [no] [no]
16. Halilsarpite (IMA2019-023) 8.CH.05 [no] [no]
17. Halite (halite, rocksalt: 1847) 3.AA.20
  (IUPAC: sodium chloride)
18. Hallimondite (IMA1965-008) 8.EA.10
  (IUPAC: dilead uranyl diarsenate (n)hydrate)
19. Halloysite (kaolinite: 1826) 9.ED.10
20. Halotrichite (halotrichite: 1777) 7.CB.85
  (IUPAC: iron(II) dialuminium tetrasulfate docosahydrate)
21. Halurgite (IMA1967 s.p., 1962) 6.H0.35
22. Hambergite (Y: 1890) 6.AB.05
  (IUPAC: diberyllium hydro borate)
23. Hammarite (meneghinite: 1924) 2.HB.05a
  (Cu_{2}Pb_{2}Bi_{4}S_{9})
24. Hanahanite (IMA2022-012) 4.E0. [no] [no]
25. Hanauerite (IMA2018-045) 2.0 [no] [no]
  (IUPAC: silver mercury sulfide iodide)
26. Hanawaltite (IMA1994-036) 3.DD.15
  ((Hg-Hg)_{3}HgO_{3}Cl_{2})
27. Hancockite (epidote, clinozoisite: IMA2006 s.p., 1899) 9.BG.05a
28. Hanjiangite (IMA2009-082) 9.E?. [no] [no]
29. Hanksite (Y: 1885) 7.BD.30
  (IUPAC: potassium docosasodium chloro nonasulfate dicarbonate)
30. Hannayite (Y: 1878) 8.CH.35
  (IUPAC: diammonium trimagnesium tetra(hydroxophosphate) octahydrate)
31. Hannebachite (IMA1983-056) 4.JE.10
  (IUPAC: dicalcium sulfite monohydrate).
32. Hansblockite (IMA2015-103) 2.0 [no] [no]
  ((Cu,Hg)(Bi,Pb)Se_{2})
33. Hansesmarkite (polyoxometalate: IMA2015-067) 4.0 [no] [no]
34. Hanswilkeite (IMA2022-041) 2.CB. [no] [no]
35. Hapkeite (silicide: IMA2003-014) 1.BB.35
  (IUPAC: diiron silicide)
36. Haradaite (IMA1963-011) 9.DH.15
  (IUPAC: strontium vanadium(IV) heptaoxodisilicate)
37. Hardystonite (melilite: 1899) 9.BB.10
  (IUPAC: dicalcium zinc heptaoxodisilicate)
38. Harkerite (Y: 1951) 6.AB.70
39. Harmotome (zeolitic tectosilicate: IMA1997 s.p., 1801) 9.GC.10
40. Harmunite (post-spinel: IMA2012-045) 4.0 [no] [no]
  (IUPAC: calcium diiron tetraoxide)
41. Harrisonite (IMA1991-010) 8.AC.55
  (IUPAC: calcium hexairon(II) di(tetraoxysilicate) diphosphate)
42. Harstigite (Y: 1886) 9.BF.05
  (IUPAC: hexacalcium tetraberyllium manganese(II) di(tetraoxysilicate) di(heptaoxodisilicate) dihydroxyl)
43. Hasanovite (IMA2020-033) [no] [no]
44. Hashemite (baryte: IMA1978-006) 7.FA.15
  (IUPAC: barium chromate(VI))
45. Hastingsite [Ca-amphibole: IMA2012 s.p., 1896] 9.DE.15
46. Hatchite (hatchite: 1912) 2.GC.05
  (IUPAC: silver lead thallium diarsenide pentasulfide)
47. Hatertite (alluaudite: IMA2012-048) 8.0 [no] [no]
  (NaNaCa(Cu^{2+}Fe^{3+})(AsO_{4})_{3})
48. Hatrurite (Y: 1977) 9.AG.65
  (IUPAC: tricalcium oxo(tetraoxysilicate))
49. Hauchecornite (hauchecornite: IMA1975-006a, 1893 Rd) 2.BB.10
  (IUPAC: nonanickel bismuth antimonide octasulfide)
50. Hauckite (IMA1979-012) 7.BB.10
51. Hauerite (pyrite: 1846) 2.EB.05a
  (IUPAC: manganese disulfide)
52. Hausmannite (spinel: 1813) 4.BB.10
  (IUPAC: manganese(II) dimanganese(III) tetraoxide)
53. Haüyne (sodalite: 1807) 9.FB.10
54. Hawleyite (sphalerite: 1955) 2.CB.05a
  (IUPAC: cadmium sulfide)
55. Hawthorneite (magnetoplumbite: IMA1988-019) 4.CC.45
56. Haxonite (carbide: IMA1971-001) 1.BA.10
  (IUPAC: triicosa(iron,nickel) hexacarbide)
57. Haycockite (chalcopyrite: IMA1971-028) 2.CB.10b
  (IUPAC: tetracopper pentairon octasulfide)
58. Haydeeite (atacamite: IMA2006-046) 3.DA.10c
  (IUPAC: tricopper magnesium hexahydro dichloride)
59. Haynesite (IMA1990-023) 4.JJ.25
  (IUPAC: triuranyl dihydro disulfite pentahydrate)
60. Haywoodite (IMA2021-115)
61. Hazenite (IMA2007-061) 8.CH.40 [no]
  (IUPAC: potassium sodium dimagnesium diphosphate tetradecahydrate)
62. Heamanite-(Ce) (IMA2020-001) 4.0 [no] [no]
63. Heazlewoodite (Y: 1897) 2.BB.05
  (IUPAC: trinickel disulfide)
64. Hechtsbergite (atelestite: IMA1995-050) 8.BO.15
  (IUPAC: dibismuth hydro oxovanadate)
65. Hectorfloresite (IMA1987-050a) 7.BD.60
  (IUPAC: nonasodium iodate tetrasulfate)
66. Hectorite^{Q} (montmorillonite, smectite: 1941) 9.EC.45
67. Hedegaardite (whitlockite: IMA2014-069) 8.0 [no] [no]
68. Hedenbergite (pyroxene: IMA1988 s.p., 1819) 9.DA.15
  (IUPAC: calcium iron(II) hexaoxydisilicate)
69. Hedleyite (tetradymite: 1945) 2.DC.05
  (IUPAC: heptabismuth tritelluride)
70. Hedyphane (apatite: IMA1980 s.p., 1830) 8.BN.05
  (IUPAC: dicalcium trilead chloro triarsenate)
71. Heftetjernite (wolframite: IMA2006-056) 4.DB.30
  (IUPAC: scandium tantalum tetraoxide)
72. Heideite (IMA1973-062) 2.DA.15
  ((Fe,Cr)_{1.15}(Ti,Fe)_{2}S_{4})
73. Heidornite (Y: 1956) 6.EC.30
74. Heinrichite (Y: 1958) 8.EB.05
  (IUPAC: barium diuranyl diarsenate decahydrate)
75. Heisenbergite (IMA2010-076) 4.GA. [no] [no]
  (IUPAC: uranyl dihydroxide monohydrate)
76. Hejtmanite (seidozerite, bafertisite: IMA1989-038) 9.BE.55
77. Heklaite (fluorosilicate: IMA2008-052) 3.0
  (IUPAC: potassium sodium hexafluorosilicate)
78. Hellandite 9.DK.20
  1. Hellandite-(Ce) (IMA2001-019) 9.DK.20 [no]
  2. Hellandite-(Y) (IMA2000-F, 1903) 9.DK.20
79. Hellyerite (IMA1962 s.p., 1959) 5.CA.20
  (IUPAC: nickel carbonate hexahydrate)
80. Helmutwinklerite (tsumcorite: IMA1979-010) 8.CG.20
  (IUPAC: lead dizinc diarsenate dihydrate)
81. Helvine (sodalite: 1804) 9.FB.10
  (IUPAC: triberyllium tetramanganese(II) tri(tetraoxysilicate) sulfide)
82. Hematite (corundum: IMA1971 s.p., 1546) 4.CB.05
  (IUPAC: diiron trioxide)
83. Hematolite (hematolite: 1884) 8.BE.45
84. Hematophanite (perovskite: 1928) 3.DB.35
  (Pb_{4}Fe(III)_{3}O_{8}(Cl,OH))
85. Hemihedrite (iranite: IMA1967-011) 7.FC.15
  (IUPAC: zinc decalead hexachromate di(tetraoxysilicate) dihydroxyl)
86. Hemimorphite (IMA1962 s.p., 1853) 9.BD.10
  (IUPAC: tetrazinc heptaoxodisilicate dihydroxyl monohydrate)
87. Hemleyite (corundum: IMA2016-085) 9.0 [no] [no]
  (IUPAC: iron trioxysilicate)
88. Hemloite (IMA1987-015) 04.JB.60
89. Hemusite (sphalerite: IMA1968-038) 2.CB.35a
  (IUPAC: tetracopper(I) dicopper(II) tin molybdenum octasulfide)
90. Hendekasartorite (sartorite: IMA2015-075) 2.0 [no] [no]
  (Tl_{2}Pb_{48}As_{82}S_{172})
91. Hendersonite (hewettite: IMA1967 s.p., 1962) 4.HG.50
92. Hendricksite (mica: IMA1965-027) 9.EC.20
  (IUPAC: potassium trizinc (aluminotrisilicate) decaoxydihydroxyl)
93. Heneuite (IMA1983-057) 8.BO.25
  (IUPAC: calcium pentamagnesium hydro triphosphate carbonate)
94. Henmilite (IMA1981-050) 6.AC.30
  (IUPAC: dicalcium copper tetrahydro di[tetrahydroborate])
95. Hennomartinite (lawsonite: IMA1992-033) 9.BE.05
  (IUPAC: strontium dimanganese(III) heptaoxodisilicate dihydroxyl monohydrate)
96. Henritermierite (garnet, henritermierite: IMA1968-029) 9.AD.25
  (IUPAC: tricalcium dimanganese(III) di(tetraoxysilicate) tetrahydroxyl)
97. Henryite (IMA1982-094) 2.BA.65
  ((Cu,Ag)_{3+x}Te_{2}, with x ~ 0.40)
98. Henrymeyerite (hollandite, coronadite: IMA1999-016) 4.DK.05b
  (IUPAC: barium (heptatitanium iron(II)) hexadecaoxide)
99. Hentschelite (IMA1985-057) 8.BB.40
  (IUPAC: copper diiron(III) dihydro diphosphate)
100. Hephaistosite (IMA2006-043) 3.AA.60
  (IUPAC: thallium dilead pentachloride)
101. Heptasartorite (sartorite: IMA2015-073) 2.0 [no] [no]
  (Tl_{7}Pb_{22}As_{55}S_{108})
102. Herbertsmithite (atacamite: IMA2003-041) 3.DA.10c
  (IUPAC: tricopper zinc hexahydro dichloride)
103. Hercynite (spinel, spinel: 1839) 4.BB.05
  (IUPAC: iron(II) dialuminium tetraoxide)
104. Herderite (gadolinite, herderite: 1828) 8.BA.10
  (IUPAC: calcium beryllium fluoro phosphate)
105. Hereroite (hereroite: IMA2011-027) 8.0 [no]
106. Hermannjahnite (zinkosite: IMA2015-050) 7.0 [no] [no]
  (IUPAC: copper zinc disulfate)
107. Hermannroseite (adelite: IMA2010-006) 8.BH.35 [no]
  (IUPAC: calcium copper hydro phosphate)
108. Herzenbergite (Y: 1935) 2.CD.05
  (IUPAC: tin sulfide)
109. Hessite (Y: 1843) 2.BA.60
  (IUPAC: disilver telluride)
110. Hetaerolite (spinel: 1877) 4.BB.10
  (IUPAC: zinc dimanganese(III) tetraoxide)
111. Heterogenite ("O(OH)" group: IMA1967 s.p., 1872) 4.FE.20
  (IUPAC: hydrocobalt(III) oxide)
112. Heteromorphite^{I} (plagionite: 1849) 2.HC.10c
  (IUPAC: heptalead octaantimonide nonadecasulfide)
113. Heterosite (olivine: 1826) 8.AB.10
  (IUPAC: iron(III) phosphate)
114. Heulandite (zeolitic tectosilicate) 9.GE.05
  1. Heulandite-Ba (IMA2003-001) 9.GE.05
    (NaBa_{4}(Si_{27}Al_{9}O_{72})·24H_{2}O, zeolite family, chain of T_{10}O_{20} tetrahedra)
  2. Heulandite-Ca (IMA1997 s.p.) 9.GE.05
    (NaCa_{4}(Si_{27}Al_{9}O_{72})·24H_{2}O, zeolite family, chain of T_{10}O_{20} tetrahedra)
  3. Heulandite-K (IMA1997 s.p., 1822) 9.GE.05 [no]
    (KCa_{4}(Si_{27}Al_{9}O_{72})·24H_{2}O, zeolite family, chain of T_{10}O_{20} tetrahedra)
  4. Heulandite-Na (IMA1997 s.p.) 9.GE.05 [no]
    ((Na,Ca)_{6}(Si,Al)_{36}O_{72}·24H_{2}O, zeolite family, chain of T_{10}O_{20} tetrahedra)
  5. Heulandite-Sr (IMA1997 s.p.) 9.GE.05 [no]
    (NaSr_{4}(Si_{27}Al_{9}O_{72})·24H_{2}O, zeolite family, chain of T_{10}O_{20} tetrahedra)
115. Hewettite (hewetite: 1914) 4.HE.15
  (IUPAC: calcium hexavanadium(V) hexadecaoxide nonahydrate)
116. Hexacelsian (dmisteinbergite: IMA2015-045) 9.F?. [no] [no]
  (IUPAC: barium (dialuminium octaoxydisilicate))
117. Hexaferrum (alloy: IMA1995-032) 1.AG.05 [no]
  (Fe,Os,Ru,Ir)
118. Hexahydrite (hexahydrite: 1911) 7.CB.25
  (IUPAC: magnesium sulfate hexahydrate)
119. Hexahydroborite (IMA1977-015) 6.AC.25
  (IUPAC: calcium di[tetrahydroborate] dihydrate)
120. Hexamolybdenum (alloy: IMA2007-029) 1.0 [no]
  (Mo,Ru,Fe,Ir,Os)
121. Hexatestibiopanickelite^{N} (Y: 1974) 2.CC.30
  ((Pd,Ni)(Sb,Te))
122. Hexathioplumbite (IMA2021-092) 7.JA. [no] [no]
123. Heyerdahlite (astrophyllite: IMA2016-108) 9.D?. [no] [no]
124. Heyite^{Q} (brackebuschite: IMA1971-042) 8.BK.20
  Note, Uwe Kolitsch: it might be calderonite.
125. Heyrovskýite (lillianite: IMA1970-022) 2.JB.40b
  (IUPAC: hexalead nonasulfa dibismuthide)
126. Hezuolinite (chevkinite: IMA2010-045) 9.BE.70 [no]

=== Hi – Hy ===
1. Hiärneite (IMA1996-040) 4.DL.10 [no]
2. Hibbingite (atacamite: IMA1991-036) 3.DA.10a
  (IUPAC: diiron(II) trihydroxide chloride)
3. Hibonite (magnetoplumbite: 1956) 4.CC.45
4. Hidalgoite (alunite, beudantite: IMA1987 s.p., 1953 Rd) 8.BL.05
  (IUPAC: lead trialuminium sulfate arsenate hexahydrate)
5. Hielscherite (ettringite: IMA2011-037) 7.0 [no] [no]
6. Hieratite (fluorosilicate: 1882) 3.CH.15
  (IUPAC: dipotassium hexafluorosilicate)
7. Hilairite (hilairite: IMA1972-019) 9.DM.10
  (IUPAC: disodium zircon nonaoxo trisilicate trihydrate)
8. Hilarionite (kaňkite: IMA2011-089) 8.0 [no] [no]
  (IUPAC: diiron(III) hydro sulfate arsenate hexahydrate)
9. Hilgardite (hilgardite: 1937) 6.ED.05
  (IUPAC: dicalcium nonaoxo pentaborate monohydrate)
10. Hillebrandite (Y: 1908) 9.DG.40
  (IUPAC: dicalcium trioxo silicate dihydroxyl)
11. Hillesheimite (günterblassite: IMA2011-080) 9.0 [no] [no]
12. Hillite (fairfieldite: IMA2003-005) 8.CG.05
  (IUPAC: dicalcium zinc diphosphate dihydrate)
13. Hingganite (gadolinite) 9.AJ.20
  1. Hingganite-(Ce) (IMA2004-004, 1987) 9.AJ.20
    (IUPAC: cerium beryllium tetraoxysilicate hydroxyl)
  2. Hingganite-(Nd) (IMA2019-028) 9.AJ.20 [no] [no]
  3. Hingganite-(Y) (IMA1981-052) 9.AJ.20
    (IUPAC: yttrium beryllium tetraoxysilicate hydroxyl)
  4. Hingganite-(Yb) (IMA1982-041) 9.AJ.20
    (IUPAC: ytterbium beryllium tetraoxysilicate hydroxyl)
14. Hinsdalite (alunite, beudandite: IMA1987 s.p., 1911 Rd) 8.BL.05
  (IUPAC: lead trialuminium hexahydro sulfate phosphate)
15. Hiortdahlite (wöhlerite: IMA1987 s.p., 1890) 9.BE.17 [no]
  1. Hiortdahlite II^{N} (Y: 1988, 1890) 9.BE.17 [no] [no]
16. Hiroseite (perovskite: IMA2019-019) 9.0 [no] [no]
  (IUPAC: iron trioxy silicate)
17. Hisingerite (kaolinite: 1819) 09.ED.10
18. Hitachiite (tetradymite: IMA2018-027) 2.0 [no] [no]
  (Pb_{5}Bi_{2}Te_{2}S_{6})
19. Hizenite-(Y) (tengerite: IMA2011-030) 5.0 [no]
  (IUPAC: dicalcium hexayttrium undecacarbonate tetradecahydrate)
20. Hjalmarite (amphibole: IMA2017-070) 9.D?. [no] [no]
21. Hloušekite (lindackerite: IMA2013-048) 8.0 [no] [no]
  ((Ni,Co)Cu_{4}(AsO_{4})_{2}(AsO_{3}OH)_{2}·9H_{2}O)
22. Hocartite (stannite: IMA1967-046) 2.CB.15a
  (IUPAC: disilver iron tin tetrasulfide)
23. Hochelagaite (IMA1983-088) 4.FM.15
  (IUPAC: calcium tetraniobium undecaoxide octahydrate)
24. Hodgesmithite (ktenasite: IMA2015-112) 7.0 [no] [no]
  (IUPAC: hexa(copper,zinc) zinc decahydro disulfate trihydrate)
25. Hodgkinsonite (Y: 1913) 9.AE.20
  (IUPAC: dizinc manganese tetraoxysilicate dihydroxyl)
26. Hodrušite (cuprobismutite: IMA1969-025) 2.JA.10c
  (IUPAC: tetracopper hexabismuth undecasulfide)
27. Hoelite (Y: 1922) 10.CA.15
  (IUPAC: 9,10-anthraquinone)
28. Hoganite (IMA2001-029) 10.AA.35
  (IUPAC: copper diacetate monohydrate)
29. Hogarthite (lemoynite: IMA2009-043) 9.E?. [no] [no]
30. Høgtuvaite (sapphirine: IMA1990-051) 9.DH.40
31. Hohmannite (amarantite: 1888) 7.DB.30
  (IUPAC: diiron(III) oxodisulfate octahydrate)
32. Holdawayite (IMA1986-001) 5.BA.20
  (IUPAC: hexamanganese(VI) (chloro,hydro) dicarbonate heptahydro)
33. Holdenite (Y: 1927) 8.BE.55
  (IUPAC: hexamanganese(II) trizinc diarsenate tetraoxysilicate octahydroxyl)
34. Holfertite (IMA2003-009) 4.GB.70
  ((UO_{2})_{1.75}Ca_{0.25}TiO_{4}·3H_{2}O)
35. Hollandite (hollandite, coronadite: IMA2012 s.p., 1906 Rd) 4.DK.05a
  (IUPAC: barium hexamanganese(IV) dimanganese(III) hexadecaoxide)
36. Hollingworthite (ullmannite: IMA1964-029) 2.EB.25
  (IUPAC: rhodium arsenide sulfide)
37. Hollisterite (alloy: IMA2016-034) 1.0 [no] [no]
  (IUPAC: trialuminium iron alloy)
38. Holmquistite [Li-amphibole: IMA2012 s.p., IMA1997 s.p., 1913] 9.DD.05
39. Holtedahlite (IMA1976-054) 8.BB.20
  (IUPAC: dodecamagnesium hexa(hydro,oxo) (hydroxophosphate,carbonate) pentaphosphate)
40. Holtite (dumortierite: IMA1969-029 Rd) 9.AJ.10
  ((Ta_{0.6}☐_{0.4})Al_{6}BSi_{3}O_{18})
41. Holtstamite (garnet: IMA2003-047) 9.AD.25
  (IUPAC: tricalcium dialuminium di(tetraoxysilicate) tetrahydroxyl)
42. Homilite (gadolinite: 1876) 9.AJ.20
  (IUPAC: dicalcium iron(II) decaoxo diboro disilicate)
43. Honeaite (IMA2015-060) 2.0 [no] [no]
  (IUPAC: trigold thallium ditelluride)
44. Honessite (hydrotalcite, woodwardite: IMA1962 s.p., 1956) 7.DD.35
45. Hongheite (vesuvianite: IMA2017-027) 9.B [no] [no]
46. Hongshiite (alloy: IMA1988-xxx, 1974) 1.AG.45
  (IUPAC: platinum copper alloy)
47. Honzaite (burgessite: IMA2014-105) 8.0 [no] [no]
  (IUPAC: dinickel dihydroxoarsenate pentawater)
48. Hopeite (hopeite: 1822) 8.CA.30
  (IUPAC: trizinc diphosphate tetrahydrate)
49. Horákite (IMA2017-033) 8.0 [no] [no]
50. Hörnesite (vivianite: 1860) 8.CE.40
  (IUPAC: trimagnesium diarsenate octahydrate)
51. Horomanite (IMA2007-037) 2.BB.
  (IUPAC: hexairon trinickel octasulfide)
52. Horváthite-(Y) (IMA1996-032) 5.BD.25
  (IUPAC: sodium yttrium difluoro carbonate)
53. Höslite (IMA2021-084) 8.DB. [no] [no]
54. Hotsonite (IMA1983-033) 8.DF.05
  (IUPAC: pentaluminium decahydro sulfate phosphate octahydrate)
55. Housleyite (IMA2009-024) 7.0 [no] [no]
  (Pb_{6}CuTe_{4}O_{18}(OH)_{2})
56. Howardevansite (howardevansite: IMA1987-011) 8.AC.05
  (IUPAC: sodium copper(II) diiron(III) trivanadate)
57. Howieite (IMA1964-017) 9.DH.65
58. Howlite (Y: 1868) 6.CB.20
  (IUPAC: dicalcium nonaoxo pentaboro silicate pentahydroxyl)
59. Hrabákite (hauchecornite: IMA2020-034) [no] [no]
60. Hsianghualite (zeolitic tectosilicate: IMA1997 s.p., 1958) 9.GB.05
  (IUPAC: dilithium tricalcium triberyllium tri(tetraoxosilicate) difluoride)
61. Huanghoite-(Ce) (IMA1967 s.p., 1961) 5.BD.35
  (IUPAC: barium cerium fluoro dicarbonate)
62. Huangite (alunite, alunite: IMA1991-009) 7.BC.10
63. Huanzalaite (wolframite: IMA2009-018) 4.DB.30 [no]
  (IUPAC: magnesium tungstate)
64. Hubeite (IMA2000-022) 9.BJ.60 [no]
65. Hübnerite (wolframite: 1865) 4.DB.30
  (IUPAC: manganese(II) tungstate)
66. Huemulite (decavanadate: IMA1965-012) 4.HG.10
67. Huenite (IMA2015-122) 7.0 [no] [no]
  (IUPAC: tetracopper dihydro trimolybdate)
68. Hügelite (Y: 1913) 8.EC.15
69. Hughesite (decavanadate: IMA2009-035a) 8.0 [no]
70. Huizingite-(Al) (IMA2015-014) 7.0 [no]
71. Hulsite (hulsite: 1908) 6.AB.45
72. Humberstonite (IMA1967-015) 7.DG.10
  (IUPAC: tripotassium heptasodium dimagnesium hexasulfate dinitrate hexahydrate)
73. Humboldtine (humboldtine: 1821) 10.AB.05
  (IUPAC: iron(II) oxalate dihydrate)
74. Humite (humite: 1813) 9.AF.50
  (IUPAC: heptamagnesium tri(tetraoxosilicate) di(fluoride,hydroxyl))
75. Hummerite (Y: 1951) 4.HC.10
76. Hunchunite (alloy: IMA1991-033) 1.AA.25
  (IUPAC: digold lead alloy)
77. Hundholmenite-(Y) (okanoganite: IMA2006-005) 9.AJ.35 [no]
  (IUPAC: magnesium pentaoxo tetraborate tetrahydro heptahydrate)
78. Hungchaoite (IMA1967 s.p., 1964) 6.DA.20
79. Huntite (Y: 1953) 5.AB.25
  (IUPAC: calcium trimagnesium tetracarbonate)
80. Hureaulite (IMA2007 s.p., 1825) 8.CB.10
  (IUPAC: pentamanganese(II) di(hydroxophosphate) diphosphate tetrahydrate)
81. Hurlbutite (danburite: 1952) 8.AA.15
  (IUPAC: calcium diberyllium diphosphate)
82. Hutcheonite (garnet, garnet: IMA2013-029) 9.AD.25 [no] [no]
  (IUPAC: tricalcium dititanium dodecaoxy dialuminosilicate)
83. Hutchinsonite (Y: 1905) 2.HD.45
  (IUPAC: lead thallium pentarsenide nonasulfide)
84. Huttonite (monazite: 1951) 9.AD.35
  (IUPAC: thorium tetraoxysilicate)
85. Hyalophane^{I} (Y: 1855) 9.FA.30
86. Hyalotekite (hyalotekite: 1877) 9.CH.05
87. Hydroastrophyllite^{N} (astrophyllite: 2003) 9.DC.05
88. Hydrobasaluminite (Y: 1948) 7.DE.60
  (IUPAC: tetraluminium decahydro sulfate pentadecahydrate)
89. Hydrobiotite (corrensite: IMA1983 s.p., 1882 Rd) 9.EC.60
  A 1:1 regular interstratification of biotite and vermiculite layers.
90. Hydroboracite (Y: 1834) 6.CB.15
91. Hydrocalumite (hydrotalcite: 1934) 4.FL.10
92. Hydrocerussite (Y: 1877) 5.BE.10
  (IUPAC: trilead dihydro dicarbonate)
93. Hydrochlorborite (Y: 1965) 6.DA.30
94. Hydrodelhayelite (IMA1979-023) 9.EB.10
95. Hydrodresserite (dundasite: IMA1976-036) 5.DB.15
  (IUPAC: barium dialuminium tetrahydro dicarbonate trihydrate)
96. Hydroglauberite (IMA1968-026) 7.CD.20
  (IUPAC: decasodium tricalcium octasulfate hexahydrate)
97. Hydrohalite (Y: 1847) 3.BA.05
  (IUPAC: sodium chloride dihydrate)
98. Hydrohalloysite (kaolinite: 1943) 9.ED. [no]
99. Hydrohonessite (hydrotalcite, woodwardite: IMA1980-037a) 7.DD.35
100. Hydrokenoelsmoreite (pyrochlore, elsmoreite: IMA2010 s.p., IMA2003-059 Rd) 4.DH.15
101. Hydrokenomicrolite (pyrochlore, microlite: IMA2011-103) 4.D [no] [no]
102. Hydrokenopyrochlore (pyrochlore, pyrochlore: IMA2017-005) 4.D [no] [no]
103. Hydrokenoralstonite (pyrochlore: 1871) 3.CF.05
104. Hydromagnesite (Y: 1828) 5.DA.05
  (IUPAC: pentamagnesium dihydro tetracarbonate tetrahydrate)
105. Hydrombobomkulite (chalcoalumite: IMA1979-079a) 5.ND.15
106. Hydroniumjarosite (alunite, alunite: IMA1987 s.p., 1960 Rd) 7.BC.10
107. Hydroniumpharmacoalumite (pharmacosiderite: IMA2012-050) 8.D [no] [no]
108. Hydroniumpharmacosiderite (pharmacosiderite: IMA2010-014) 8.DK.10 [no]
109. Hydronováčekite (IMA2007 s.p., 1951) 8.EB.05 [no] [no]
  (IUPAC: magnesium diuranyl diarsenate dodecahydrate)
110. Hydropascoite (pascoite: IMA2016-032) 4.0 [no] [no]
111. Hydroplumboelsmoreite (jixianite, pyrochlore: IMA2021 s.p., IMA2013 s.p., IMA2010 s.p., IMA1984-062) 4.DH.15
112. Hydropyrochlore (pyrochlore, pyrochlore: IMA2010 s.p., 1977 Rd) 4.DH.15
113. Hydroredmondite (redmondite: IMA2021-073) [no] [no]
114. Hydroromarchite ("O(OH)" group: IMA1969-007) 4.FF.05
  (IUPAC: dihydrotritin(II) dioxide)
115. Hydroscarbroite^{Q} (Y: 1960) 5.DA.35
116. Hydrotalcite (hydrotalcite: 1842) 5.DA.50
117. Hydroterskite (terskite: IMA2015-042) 4.0 [no] [no]
  (IUPAC: disodium dodecaoxy zirconhexasilicate hexahydroxyl)
118. Hydrotungstite (Y: 1944) 4.FJ.15
  (IUPAC: tungsten dihydro dioxide monohydrate)
119. Hydrowoodwardite (hydrotalcite, woodwardite: IMA1996-038) 7.DD.35
120. Hydroxyapophyllite-(K) (apophyllite: IMA2013 s.p., IMA1978 s.p.) 9.EA.15
121. Hydroxycalciomicrolite (pyrochlore, microlite: IMA2013-073) 4.D [no] [no]
  (IUPAC: pentadecacalcium ditantalum hexaoxo hydro)
122. Hydroxycalciopyrochlore (pyrochlore, pyrochlore: IMA2011-026) 4.D [no] [no]
123. Hydroxycalcioroméite (pyrochlore, roméite: IMA2010 s.p., 1895 Rd) 4.D
124. Hydroxycancrinite (cancrinite: IMA1990-014) 9.FB.05
125. Hydroxyferroroméite (pyrochlore, roméite: IMA2016-006) 4.D [no] [no]
126. Hydroxykenoelsmoreite (pyrochlore, elsmoreite: IMA2016-056) 4.D [no] [no]
127. Hydroxykenomicrolite (pyrochlore, microlite: IMA2010 s.p., IMA1980-021 Rd) 4.DH.
128. Hydroxykenopyrochlore (pyrochlore, pyrochlore: IMA2017-030a) 4.D [no] [no]
129. Hydroxylapatite (apatite: IMA2010 s.p., 1856) 8.BN.05
  (IUPAC: pentacalcium hydro triphosphate)
130. Hydroxylbastnäsite (bastnäsite) 5.BD.20a
  (IUPAC: REE hydrocarbonate)
  1. Hydroxylbastnäsite-(Ce) (IMA1987 s.p., 1964) 5.BD.20a
  2. Hydroxylbastnäsite-(La) (1986, IMA2021-001) 5.BD.20a [no]
  3. Hydroxylbastnäsite-(Nd) (IMA1984-060) 5.BD.20a
131. Hydroxylborite (IMA2005-054) 6.AB.50
  (IUPAC: trimagnesium trihydro borate)
132. Hydroxylchondrodite (humite: IMA2010-019) 9.AF.45 [no]
  (IUPAC: pentamagnesium di(tetraoxysilicate) dihydroxyl)
133. Hydroxylclinohumite (humite: IMA1998-065) 9.AF.55 [no]
  (IUPAC: nonamagnesium tetra(tetraoxysilicate) dihydroxyl)
134. Hydroxyledgrewite (humite: IMA2011-113) 9.AF. [no] [no]
  (IUPAC: nonacalcium tetra(tetraoxysilicate) dihydroxyl)
135. Hydroxylellestadite (apatite: IMA2010 s.p., IMA1970-026) 9.AH.25
136. Hydroxylgugiaite (melilite: IMA2016-009) 9.B?. [no] [no]
137. Hydroxylhedyphane (apatite: IMA2018-052) 8.BN. [no] [no]
  (IUPAC: dicalcium trilead hydro triarsenate)
138. Hydroxylherderite (gadolinite: IMA2007 s.p., 1894) 8.BA.10
  (IUPAC: calcium beryllium hydro phosphate)
139. Hydroxylpyromorphite (apatite: IMA2017-075) 8.0 [no] [no]
  (IUPAC: pentalead hydro triphosphate)
140. Hydroxylwagnerite (wagnerite: IMA2004-009) 8.BB.15 [no] [no]
  (IUPAC: dimagnesium hydro phosphate)
141. Hydroxymanganopyrochlore (pyrochlore, pyrochlore: IMA2012-005) 4.D [no]
142. Hydroxymcglassonite-(K) (apophyllite: IMA2020-066) 9.0 [no] [no]
143. Hydroxynatropyrochlore (pyrochlore, pyrochlore: IMA2017-074) 4.D [no] [no]
144. Hydroxyplumbopyrochlore (pyrochlore: IMA2018-145) 4.0 [no] [no]
145. Hydrozincite (Y: 1853) 5.BA.15
  (IUPAC: pentazinc hexahydro dicarbonate)
146. Hylbrownite (kanonerovite: IMA2010-054) 8.FC. [no] [no]
147. Hypercinnabar (IMA1977-D) 2.CD.15b
  (IUPAC: mercury sulfide)
148. Hyršlite (sartorite: IMA2016-097) 2.0 [no] [no]
  (Pb_{8}As_{10}Sb_{6}S_{32})
149. Hyttsjöite (IMA1993-056) 9.EG.60 [no]
