= List of minerals recognized by the International Mineralogical Association (E) =

This list includes those recognised minerals beginning with the letter E. The International Mineralogical Association is the international group that recognises new minerals and new mineral names; however, minerals discovered before 1959 did not go through the official naming procedure, although some minerals published previously have been either confirmed or discredited since that date. This list contains a mixture of mineral names that have been approved since 1959 and those mineral names believed to still refer to valid mineral species (these are called "grandfathered" species).

The list is divided into groups:

- Introduction • (Main synonyms)
- A • B • C • D • E • F • G • H • I • J • K • L • M • N • O • P–Q • R • S • T • U–V • W–X • Y–Z

The data was exported from mindat.org on 29 April 2005; updated up to 'IMA2021'.

The minerals are sorted by name, followed by the structural group (rruff.info/ima and ima-cnmnc by mineralienatlas.de, mainly) or chemical class (mindat.org and basics), the year of publication (if it's before of an IMA approval procedure), the IMA approval and the Strunz-mindat code. The first link is to mindat.org, the second link is to webmineral.com, and the third is to the Handbook of Mineralogy (Mineralogical Society of America).

- Abbreviations:
  - ^{D} – discredited (IMA/CNMNC status).
  - ^{Q} – questionable/ doubtful (IMA/CNMNC, mindat.org or mineralienatlas.de status).
  - ^{N} – published without approval of the IMA/CNMNC, or just not an IMA approved mineral but with some acceptance in the scientific community nowadays.
  - ^{I} – intermediate member of a solid-solution series.
  - ^{H} – hypothetical mineral (synthetic, anthropogenic, suspended approval procedure, etc.)
    - ^{ch} – incomplete description, hypothetical solid solution end member.
  - Rd – redefinition of ...
  - "s.p." – special procedure.
  - group – a name used to designate a group of species, sometimes only a mineral group name.
  - no – no link available.
  - IUPAC – chemical name.
  - Y: NNNN – year of publication.
  - Y: old – known before publications were available.

== E ==
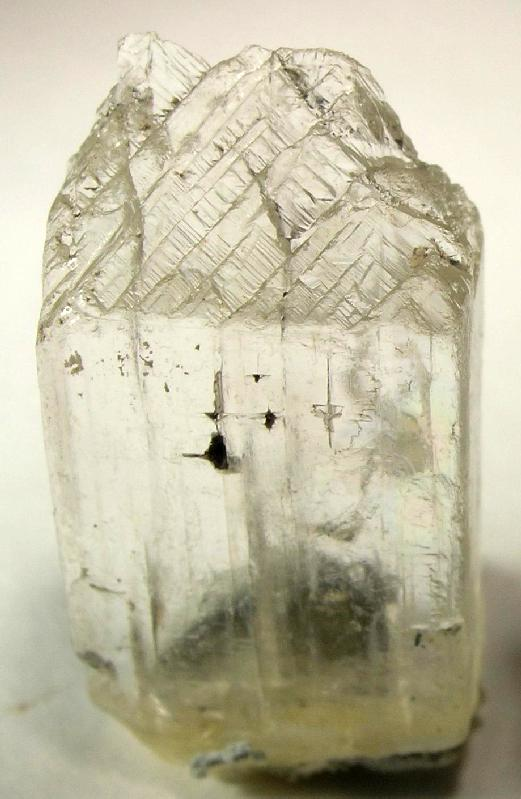
Edingtonite, 1.8 x 1 x .4 cm, Vretgruvan, Bölet, Undenäs, Karlsborg, Västergötland, Sweden

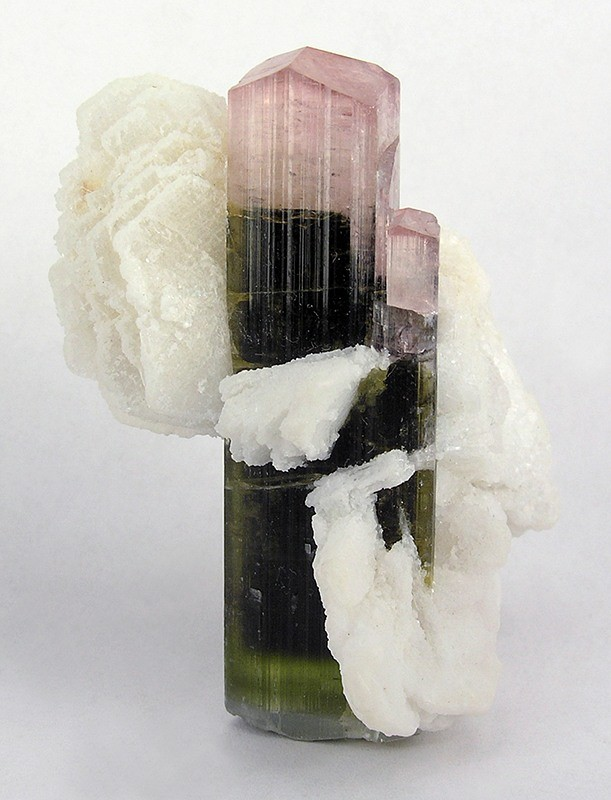
A combination of pink pinacoid and green basal terminations on a dark core of elbaite

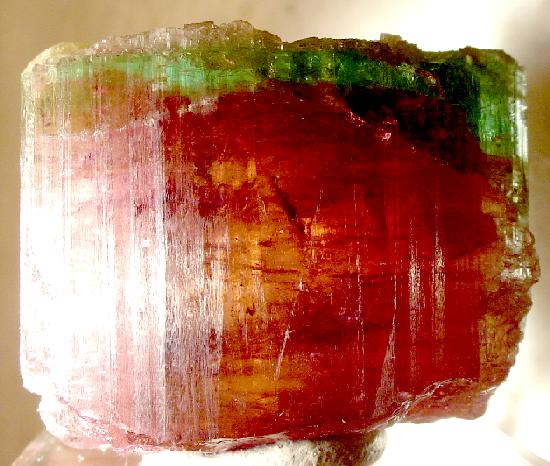
Elbaite, 4.5 × 3.8 × 3.0 cm, Dunton Gem Quarry, Newry, Maine, US

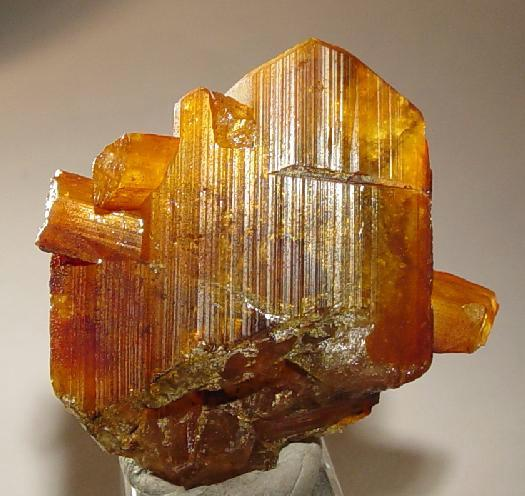
Eosphorite, 3.2 × 3.2 × 1 cm, Mendes Pimentel, Minas Gerais, Brazil

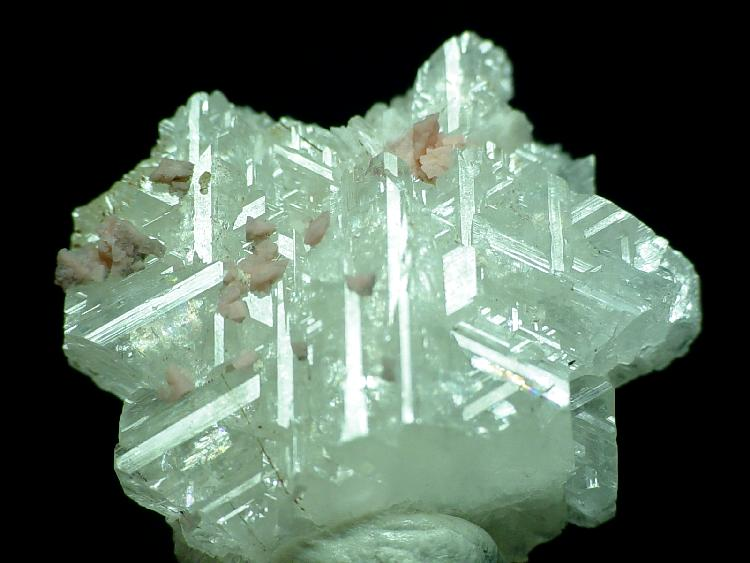
Epididymite, 2.5 × 2 × 1 cm, Poudrette quarry, Mont Saint-Hilaire, Montérégie, Quebec, Canada

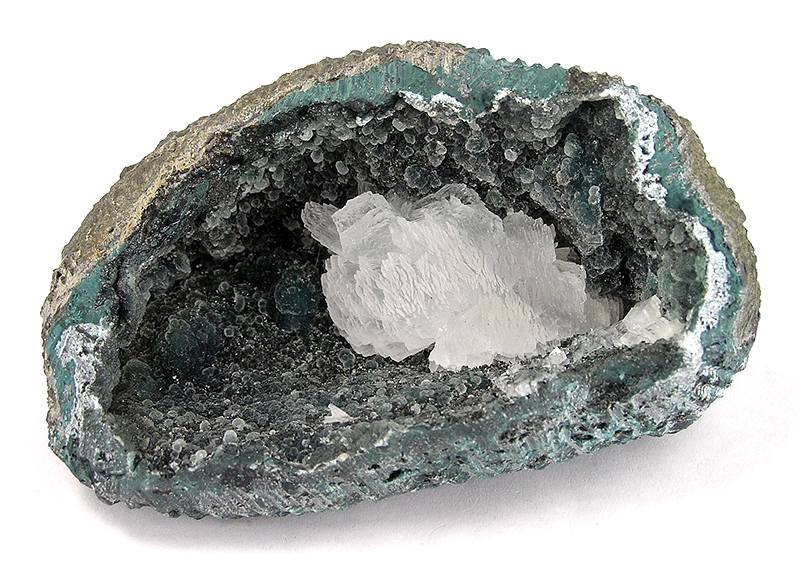
Translucent, colorless epistilbite in vug

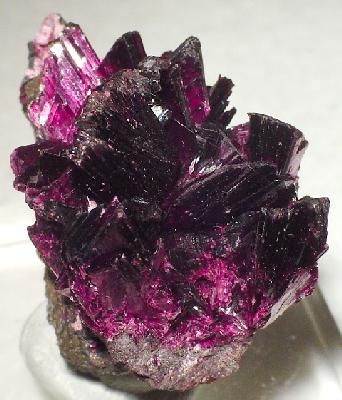
Erythrite, 4.3 × 3.5 × 2.9 cm. Bou Azzer District, Ouarzazate Province, Morocco

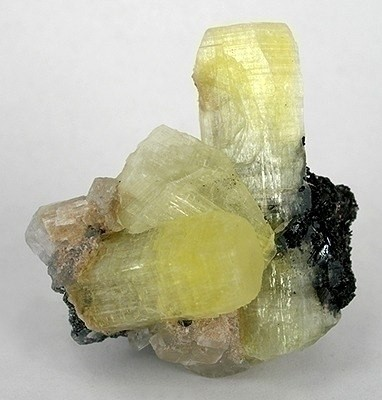
Ettringite, N'Chwaning Mines, Kuruman, Kalahari manganese fields, Northern Cape Province, South Africa

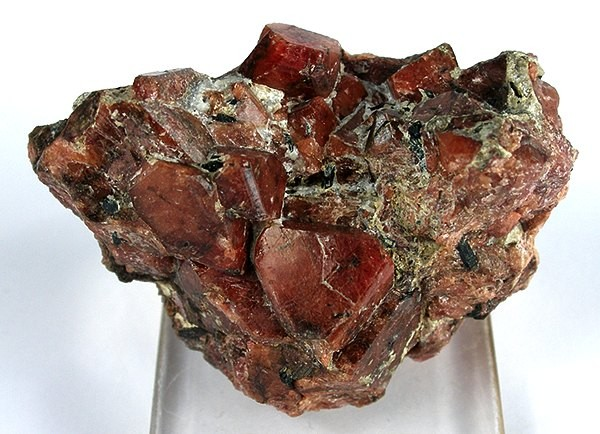
Carmine-red crystals of eudialyte cover solid eudialyte matrix on this specimen from the Khibiny Massif of the Kola Peninsula, Russia

1. Eakerite (IMA1969-019) 9.CG.05
2. Earlandite (citrate: 1936) 10.AC.10
  (IUPAC: calcium citrate tetrahydrate)
3. Earlshannonite (arthurite: IMA1983-010) 8.DC.15
  (IUPAC: manganese(II) diiron(III) dihydro diphosphate tetrahydrate)
4. Eastonite (mica: IMA1998 s.p., 1925 Rd) 9.EC.20 [no]
  (IUPAC: potassium aluminium dimagnesium (dialuminodisilicate) decaoxy dihydroxyl)
5. Ecandrewsite (corundum: IMA1978-082) 4.CB.05
  (IUPAC: zinc titanium trioxide)
6. Ecdemite (Y: 1877) 3.DC.65
  (IUPAC: hexalead heptaoxodiarsenate(III) tetrachloride)
7. Eckerite (xanthoconite: IMA2014-063) 2.0 [no] [no]
  (IUPAC: disilver copper trisulfa arsenide)
8. Eckermannite [Na-amphibole: IMA2013-136, IMA2012 s.p., 1942] 9.DE.25
9. Eckhardite (tellurium oxysalt: IMA2012-085) 7.C?. [no] [no]
10. Eclarite (kobellite: IMA1982-092) 2.HB.10c
  (IUPAC: (copper,iron) nonalead octaicosasulfa dodecabismuthide)
11. Écrinsite (sartorite: IMA2015-099) 2.0 [no] [no]
12. Eddavidite (IMA2018-010) 3.DB.45 [no] [no]
13. Edenharterite (IMA1987-026) 2.HD.35
  (IUPAC: thallium lead hexasulfa triarsenide)
14. Edenite [Ca-amphibole: IMA2012 s.p., 1839] 9.DE.15
15. Edgarbaileyite (IMA1988-028) 9.BC.25
  (IUPAC: tri(dimercury) heptaoxodisilicate)
16. Edgarite (IMA1995-017) 2.DB.25
  (IUPAC: iron triniobium hexasulfide)
17. Edgrewite (humite: IMA2011-058) 9.0 [no] [no]
  (IUPAC: nonacalcium tetra(tetraoxosilicate) difluoride)
18. Edingtonite (zeolitic tectosilicate: 1825) 9.GA.15
  (IUPAC: barium (dialuminotrisilicate) decaoxy tetrahydrate)
19. Edoylerite (IMA1987-008) 7.FB.25
  (IUPAC: trimercury(II) tetraoxochromate(VI) disulfide)
20. Edscottite (carbide: IMA2018-086a) 1.0 [no] [no]
  (IUPAC: pentairon dicarbide)
21. Edtollite (IMA2016-010) 8.0 [no]
  (IUPAC: dipotassium sodium pentacopper iron(III) dioxotetrarsenate)
22. Edwardsite (IMA2009-048) 7.DD.30 [no]
  (IUPAC: tricopper dicadmium hexahydro disulfate tetrahydrate)
23. Effenbergerite (gillespite: IMA1993-036) 9.EA.05 [no]
  (IUPAC: barium copper decaoxotetrasilicate)
24. Efremovite (langbeinite: IMA1987-033a) 7.AC.10
  (IUPAC: diammonium dimagnesium trisulfate)
25. Eggletonite (IMA1982-059) 9.EG.30
26. Eglestonite (Y: 1904) 3.DD.05
  (IUPAC: tri(dimercury) hydro oxotrichloride)
27. Ehrleite (IMA1983-039) 8.CA.10
  (IUPAC: dicalcium zinc beryllium diphosphate hydroxophosphate(V) tetrahydrate)
28. Eifelite (milarite: IMA1980-097) 9.CM.05
  (IUPAC: potassium disodium (magnesium sodium) (trimagnesium dodecasilicate) triacontaoxy)
29. Eirikite (leifite: IMA2007-017) 9.EH.25
30. Eitelite (Y: 1955) 5.AC.05
  (IUPAC: disodium magnesium dicarbonate)
31. Ekanite (amorphous: IMA1967 s.p., 1961) 9.EA.10
  (IUPAC: dicalcium thorium icosaoxoctasilicate)
32. Ekaterinite (IMA1979-067) 6.H0.40
  (IUPAC: dicalcium dichloro heptaoxotetraborate dihydrate)
33. Ekatite (ellenbergite: IMA1998-024) 4.JB.75 [no]
34. Ekebergite (IMA2018-088) 4.0 [no] [no]
35. Ekplexite (valleriite: IMA2011-082) 2.0 [no]
36. Elasmochloite (IMA2018-015) 7.0 [no] [no]
37. Elbaite (tourmaline: 1913) 9.CK.05
38. Elbrusite (garnet: IMA2012 s.p., IMA2009-051) 4.0 [no] [no]
39. Eldfellite (zinkosite: IMA2007-051) 7.AC.15
  (IUPAC: sodium iron(III) disulfate)
40. Eldragónite (IMA2010-077) 2.0 [no]
  (IUPAC: hexacopper bismuth tetraselenide diselenide)
41. Eleomelanite (IMA2015-118) 7.0 [no] [no]
  (IUPAC: (dipotassium lead) tetracopper dioxotetrasulfate)
42. Elgoresyite (IMA2020-086) 4.BB. [no] [no]
43. Eliopoulosite (IMA2019-096) 2.0 [no] [no]
  (IUPAC: heptavanadium octasulfide)
44. Eliseevite (IMA2010-031) 9.DB.17 [no] [no]
45. Ellenbergerite (ellenbergerite: IMA1984-066) 9.AF.80
46. Ellinaite (IMA2019-091) 4.0 [no] [no]
  (IUPAC: calcium dichromium tetraoxide)
47. Ellingsenite (IMA2009-041) 9.E?. [no]
48. Elliottite (IMA2021-113) 8.DD. [no] [no]
49. Ellisite (IMA1977-041) 2.JC.05
  (IUPAC: trithallium arsenide trisulfide)
50. Elpasolite (double perovskite: 1883) 3.CB.15
  (IUPAC: dipotassium sodium hexafluoroaluminate)
51. Elpidite (Y: 1894) 9.DG.65
52. Eltyubyuite (mayenite: IMA2011-022) 9.AD.25 [no]
53. Elyite (IMA1971-043) 7.DF.65
  (IUPAC: copper tetralead sulfate monohydrate)
54. Embreyite (IMA1971-048) 7.FC.20
  (IUPAC: pentalead dioxo tetrahydro dichromate diphosphate monohydrate)
55. Emeleusite (IMA1977-021) 9.DN.05
  (IUPAC: disodium lithium iron(III) pentadecaoxohexasilicate)
56. Emilite (meneghinite: IMA2001-015) 2.HB.05a [no]
  ( Cu_{10.7}Pb_{10.7}Bi_{21.3}S_{48})
57. Emmerichite (seidozerite, lamprophyllite: IMA2013-064) 9.BE. [no] [no]
58. Emmonsite (tellurite: 1885) 4.JM.10
  (IUPAC: diiron(III) tritellurate(IV) dihydrate)
59. Emplectite (chalcostibite: 1855) 2.HA.05
  (IUPAC: copper(I) disulfa bismuthide)
60. Empressite (IMA1964 s.p., 1914 Rd) 2.CB.80
  (IUPAC: silver telluride)
61. Enargite (wurzite: 1850) 2.KA.05
  (IUPAC: tricopper tetrasulfa arsenide)
62. Engelhauptite (polyvanate: IMA2013-009) 8.0 [no] [no]
  (IUPAC: potassium tricopper dihydro chloro (heptaoxodivanadate))
63. Englishite (Y: 1930) 8.DH.55
64. Enneasartorite (sartorite: IMA2015-074) 2.0 [no] [no]
65. Enstatite (pyroxene: IMA1988 s.p., 1855) 9.DA.05
  (IUPAC: dimagnesium hexaoxodisilicate)
66. Eosphorite (childrenite: 1878) 8.DD.20
  (IUPAC: manganese(II) aluminium dihydro phosphate monohydrate)
67. Ephesite (mica: IMA1998 s.p., 1851) 9.EC.20
  (IUPAC: sodium lithium dialuminium (dialumodisilicate) decaoxy dihydroxyl)
68. Epididymite (Y: 1893) 9.DG.55
  (IUPAC: disodium diberyllium pentadecaoxohexasilicate monohydrate)
69. Epidote (epidote) 9.BG.05x
  1. Epidote (1801) 9.BG.05a
    (IUPAC: dicalcium (dialuminum iron(III)) heptaoxodisilicate tetraoxosilicate oxy hydroxyl)
  2. Epidote-(Sr) (IMA2006-055) 9.BG.05
    (IUPAC: calcium strontium (dialuminum iron(III)) heptaoxodisilicate tetraoxosilicate oxy hydroxyl)
70. Epifanovite (andyrobertsite: IMA2016-063) 8.0 [no] [no]
  (IUPAC: sodium calcium pentacopper tetraphosphate dihydroxoarsenate(V) heptahydrate)
71. Epistilbite (zeolitic tectosilicate: IMA1997 s.p., 1826) 9.GD.45
72. Epistolite (seidozerite, lamprophyllite: 1901) 9.BE.30
73. Epsomite (epsomite: 1721) 7.CB.40
  (IUPAC: magnesium sulfate heptahydrate)
74. Erazoite (IMA2014-061) 2.0 [no] [no]
  (IUPAC: tetracopper hexasulfa stannide)
75. Ercitite (IMA1999-036) 8.DJ.35 [no]
  (IUPAC: sodium manganese(III) hydro phosphate dihydrate)
76. Erdite (IMA1977-048) 2.FD.20
  (IUPAC: sodium iron sulfide dihydrate)
77. Ericaite (boracite: 1950) 6.GA.05
  (IUPAC: triiron(II) chloro tridecaoxoheptaborate)
78. Ericlaxmanite (IMA2013-022) 8.0 [no] [no]
  (IUPAC: tetracopper oxodiarsenate)
79. Ericssonite (lamprophyllite: IMA1966-013 Rd) 9.BE.25
  (IUPAC: barium dimanganese(II) iron(III) heptaoxodisilicate oxy hydroxyl)
80. Erikapohlite (alluaudite: IMA2010-090) 8.0 [no] [no]
  ((☐_{0.5}Cu_{0.5})CuCaZn_{2}(AsO_{4})_{3}·H_{2}O)
81. Erikjonssonite (IMA2018-058) 3.0 [no] [no]
82. Eringaite (garnet, garnet: IMA2009-054) 9.AD. [no]
  (IUPAC: tricalcium discandium tri(tetraoxosilicate))
83. Eriochalcite (Y: 1870) 3.BB.05
  (IUPAC: copper dichloride dihydrate)
84. Erionite (zeolitic tectosilicate) 9.GD.20
  1. Erionite-Ca (IMA1997 s.p.) 9.GD.20 [no]
  2. Erionite-K (IMA1997 s.p.) 9.GD.20
  3. Erionite-Na (IMA1997 s.p., 1898) 9.GD.20 [no]
85. Erlianite (IMA1985-042) 9.HC.05
  (IUPAC: tetrairon(II) diiron(III) pentadecaoxohexasilicate octahydroxyl)
86. Erlichmanite (pyrite: IMA1970-048) 2.EB.05a
  (IUPAC: osmium disulfide)
87. Ermakovite (IMA2020-054) 4.0 [no] [no]
88. Ernienickelite (IMA1993-002) 4.FL.20
  (IUPAC: nickel trimanganese(IV) heptaoxide trihydrate)
89. Erniggliite (IMA1987-025) 2.GA.45
  (IUPAC: dithallium tin hexasulfa diarsenide)
90. Ernstburkeite (IMA2010-059) 10.0 [no]
91. Ernstite (childrenite: IMA1970-012) 8.DD.20
  (IUPAC: (manganese(II),iron(II)) aluminium di(hydro,oxo) phosphate)
92. Ershovite (IMA1991-014) 9.DF.15
93. Erssonite (hydrotalcite: IMA2021-016) 7.DF. [no] [no]
94. Ertixiite (IMA1983-042) 9.HA.05
  (IUPAC: disodium nonaoxotetrasilicate)
95. Erythrite (vivianite: 1832) 8.CE.40
  (IUPAC: tricobalt diarsenate octahydrate)
96. Erythrosiderite (Y: 1872) 3.CJ.10
  (IUPAC: dipotassium iron(III) pentachloride monohydrate)
97. Erzwiesite (lillianite: IMA2012-082) 2.0 [no] [no]
  (IUPAC: octasilver dodecalead tetracontasulfa hexadecabismuthide)
98. Escheite (zorite: IMA2018-099) 9.DG. [no] [no]
99. Esdanaite-(Ce) (IMA2018-112) 8.0 [no] [no]
100. Eskebornite (chalcopyrite: 1950) 2.CB.10a
  (IUPAC: copper iron diselenide)
101. Eskimoite (lillianite: IMA1976-005) 2.JB.40b
  (IUPAC: heptasilver decalead hexatricontasulfa pentadecabismuthide)
102. Eskolaite (corundum: 1958) 4.CB.05
  (IUPAC: chromium(III) oxide)
103. Espadaite (IMA2018-089) 8.CF. [no] [no]
104. Esperanzaite (IMA1998-025) 8.DM.05
  (IUPAC: sodium dicalcium dialuminium tetrafluoro hydro diarsenate dihydrate)
105. Esperite (beryllonite: IMA1964-027) 9.AB.15
  (IUPAC: lead dicalcium tri[zinc tetraoxosilicate])
106. Esquireite (IMA2014-066) 9.E?. [no] [no]
  (IUPAC: barium tridecaoxohexasilicate heptahydrate)
107. Esseneite (pyroxene: IMA1985-048) 9.DA.15
  (IUPAC: calcium iron(III) aluminohexaoxosilicate)
108. Ettringite (ettringite: IMA1962 s.p., 1874) 7.DG.15
  (IUPAC: hexacalcium dialuminium dodecahydro trisulfate hexaicosahydrate)
109. Eucairite (Y: 1818) 2.BA.50
  (IUPAC: copper silver selenide)
110. Euchlorine (euchlorine: 1884) 7.BC.30
  (IUPAC: potassium sodium tricopper oxotrisulfate)
111. Euchroite (Y: 1823) 8.DC.07
  (IUPAC: dicopper hydro arsenate trihydrate)
112. Euclase (Y: 1792) 9.AE.10
  (IUPAC: beryllium aluminium tetraoxosilicate hydroxyl)
113. Eucryptite (phenakite: 1880) 9.AA.05
  (IUPAC: lithium aluminium tetraoxosilicate)
114. Eudialyte (eudialyte: IMA2003 s.p., 1819) 9.CO.10
115. Eudidymite (Y: 1887) 9.DG.60
  (IUPAC: disodium diberyllium pentadecaoxohexasilicate monohydrate)
116. Eugenite (amalgam: IMA1981-037) 1.AD.15c
  (IUPAC: undecasilver dimercury amalgam)
117. Eugsterite (IMA1980-008) 7.CD.25
  (IUPAC: tetrasodium calcium trisulfate dihydrate)
118. Eulytine (Y: 1827) 9.AD.40
  (IUPAC: tetrabismuth tri(tetraoxosilicate))
119. Eurekadumpite (tellurite-arsenate: IMA2009-072) 8.0 [no]
  (IUPAC: hexadeca(copper,zinc) octadecahydro chloro ditellurate(IV) triarsenate heptahydrate)
120. Euxenite-(Y) (columbite: IMA1987 s.p., 1840) 4.DG.05
121. Evansite^{Q} (amorphous: 1864) 8.DF.10
  (IUPAC: trialuminium hexahydro phosphate octahydrate)
122. Evdokimovite (IMA2013-041) 7.0 [no] [no]
  (IUPAC: tetrathallium tri(oxovanadate) pentasulfate pentawater)
123. Eveite (andalusite: IMA1966-047) 8.BB.30
  (IUPAC: dimanganese(II) hydroarsenate)
124. Evenkite (Y: 1953) 10.BA.50
125. Evseevite (moraskoite: IMA2019-064) 8.0 [no] [no]
  (IUPAC: disodium magnesium fluoro arsenate)
126. Eveslogite (IMA2001-023) 9.DG.97 [no]
127. Ewaldite (IMA1969-013) 5.CC.05
128. Ewingite (hydrous uranyl carbonate: IMA2016-012) 5.0 [no] [no]
129. Eylettersite (alunite, crandallite: IMA1969-035) 8.BL.10
130. Eyselite (IMA2003-052) 4.DM.20 [no]
  (IUPAC: iron(III) trigermanium(IV) hydro heptaoxide)
131. Ezcurrite (Y: 1957) 6.EB.10
  (IUPAC: disodium trihydroheptaoxopentaborate dihydrate)
132. Eztlite (tellurite-tellurium oxysalt: IMA1980-072) 4.JN.20
  (IUPAC: dilead hexairon(III) decahydro tritellurate(IV) hexaoxotellurate(VI) octahydrate)
