= Haxonite =

Carbide mineral

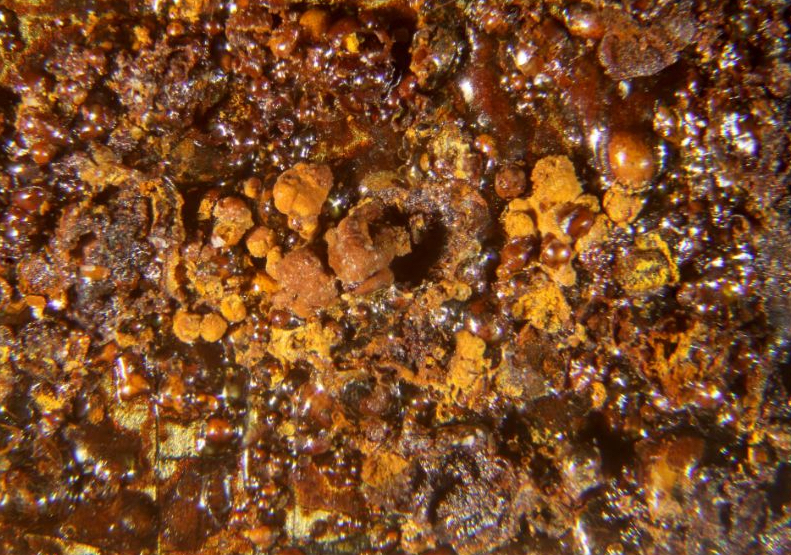

General
- Category: Native element minerals
- Formula: (Fe,Ni)_{23}C_{6}
- IMA symbol: Hax
- Strunz classification: 1.BA.10
- Crystal system: Isometric; Unknown space group

Identification
- Mohs scale hardness: 5 1/2 - 6

Haxonite is an iron nickel carbide mineral found in iron meteorites and carbonaceous chondrites. It has a chemical formula of (Fe,Ni)_{23}C_{6}, crystallises in the cubic crystal system and has a Mohs hardness of 5 1/2 - 6.

It was first described in 1971, and named after Howard J. Axon (1924–1992), metallurgist at the University of Manchester, Manchester, England. Co-type localities are the Toluca meteorite, Xiquipilco, Mexico and the Canyon Diablo meteorite, Meteor Crater, Coconino County, Arizona, US.

It occurs associated with kamacite, taenite, schreibersite, cohenite, pentlandite and magnetite.

== See also ==
- Glossary of meteoritics
- Edscottite
