= Ledeburite =

Eutectic mixture of austenite and cementite

Iron-carbon phase diagram, showing the iron-carbon phase diagram (near the lower left).

In iron and steel metallurgy, ledeburite is a mixture of 4.3% carbon in iron and is a eutectic mixture of austenite and cementite. Ledeburite is not a type of steel as the carbon level is too high although it may occur as a separate constituent in some high carbon steels. It is mostly found with cementite or pearlite in a range of cast irons.

It is named after the metallurgist Karl Heinrich Adolf Ledebur (1837–1906). He was the first professor of metallurgy at the Bergakademie Freiberg and discovered ledeburite in 1882.

Ledeburite arises when the carbon content is between 2.06% and 6.67%. The eutectic mixture of austenite and cementite is 4.3% carbon, Fe_{3}C:2Fe, with a melting point of 1147 °C.

Ledeburite-II (at ambient temperature) is composed of cementite-I with recrystallized secondary cementite (which separates from austenite as the metal cools) and (with slow cooling) of pearlite. The pearlite results from the eutectoidal decay of the austenite that comes from the ledeburite-I at 723 °C. During more rapid cooling, bainite can develop instead of pearlite, and with very rapid cooling martensite can develop.

== Origins and discovery ==
The story of ledeburite begins in the late 19th century when Adolf Ledebur, a pioneering German metallurgist, embarked on a journey to unravel the complexities of steel microstructures. In 1882, Ledebur identified a distinct microconstituent in high-carbon steels, characterized by its unique lamellar structure. This discovery marked the birth of ledeburite, named in honor of the scientist whose keen observations laid the foundation for understanding the intricate world within steel.

== Significance in metallurgical studies ==
Beyond its immediate industrial applications, ledeburite holds a central position in metallurgical studies. The exploration of this unique microconstituent contributes to a deeper understanding of phase transformations, solidification processes, and the principles governing alloy behavior. Researchers and metallurgists leverage ledeburite as a model system to investigate the fundamental aspects of phase diagrams, eutectic reactions, and the kinetics of microstructural evolution during cooling and solidification.

Metallurgical studies involving ledeburite extend to the development of advanced materials with tailored properties. By comprehending the nuances of ledeburite formation and its impact on steel performance, scientists can design alloys with improved strength, hardness, and corrosion resistance. This knowledge is invaluable in pushing the boundaries of material science and engineering, paving the way for innovations in diverse fields.
