= Enneasartorite =

Very rare mineral

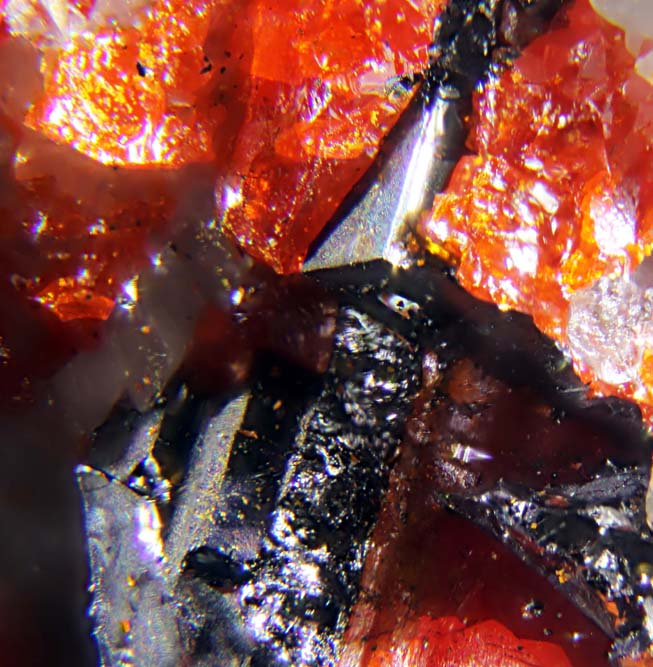
- Enneasartorite with hendekasartorite. These minerals are very similar and often indistinguishable without advanced techniques.

General
- Category: Sulfosalt
- Formula: Tl_{6}Pb_{32}As_{70}S_{140}
- IMA symbol: Esat
- Crystal system: Monoclinic
- Crystal class: Prismatic (2/m) (same H-M symbol)
- Space group: P2_{1}/c
- Unit cell: a = 37.62, b = 7.88 c = 20.07 [Å]; β = 101.93° (approximated)

Identification

Enneasartorite is a very rare mineral with formula Tl_{6}Pb_{32}As_{70}S_{140}. It belongs to sartorite homologous series. It is related to other recently approved minerals of the sartorite series: hendekasartorite and heptasartorite. All come from Lengenbach quarry in Switzerland, which is famous for thallium sulfosalts. Enneasartorite is chemically similar to edenharterite and hutchinsonite.
