= Emil Cohen =

German mineralogist

Emil Wilhelm Cohen
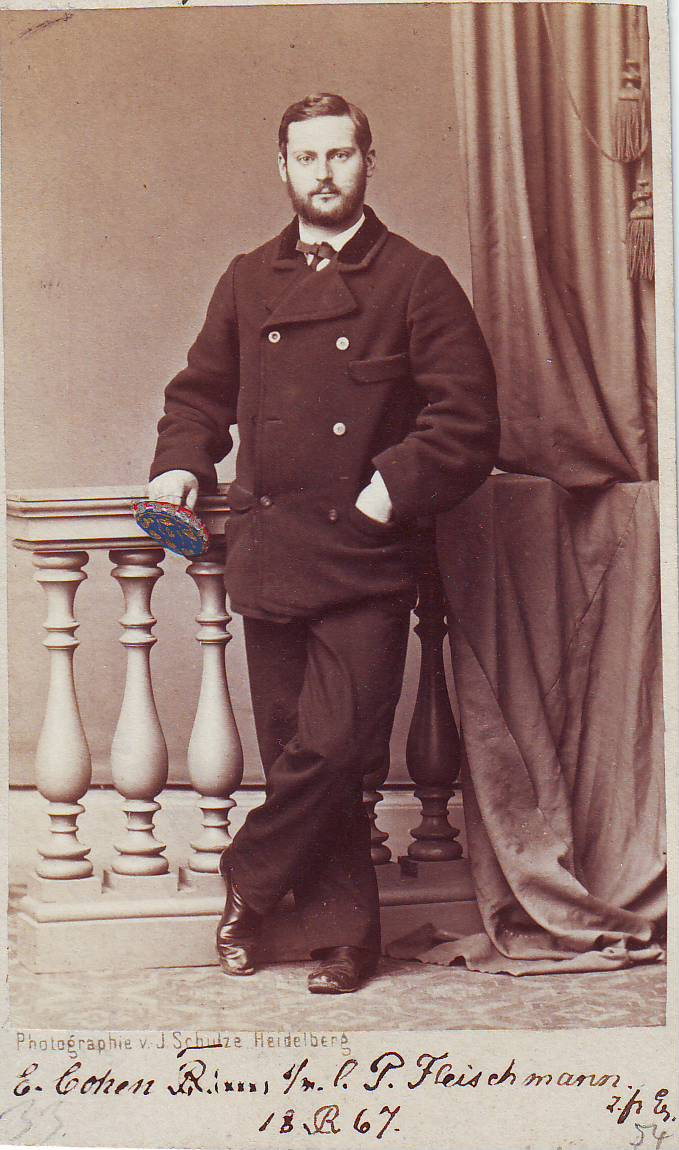
- Born: October 12, 1842; Akjär near Horsens, Jutland, Denmark
- Died: April 13, 1905 (aged 62); Greifswald, Germany
- Known for: A founder of modern petrography
- Scientific career
- Fields: Mineralogy, petrography, meteoritics

Emil Wilhelm Cohen (12 October 1842 – 13 April 1905) was a German mineralogist and petrographer, born in Jutland.

== Professional life ==
Cohen studied at the universities of Berlin and Heidelberg and from 1867 to 1872 was a mineralogy assistant in the latter. He then spent 18 months in South Africa, where he studied diamond and gold deposits.

Cohen devoted his following years to mineralogy and drafting descriptions of his African explorations. Through his Sammlung von Mikrophotographien zur Veranschaulichung der mikroskopischen Structur von Mineralien und Gesteinen] (1881–83; "Collection of Microphotographs on the microscopic Structure of Minerals and Rocks"), he founded modern petrography.

In 1878 Cohen became professor of petrography at Strasbourg and Director of the Geological Survey for Alsace and Lorraine. In 1885 he was made professor of mineralogy at the University of Greifswald. There he started work on meteorites, one of the first mineralogists to describe the petrography of iron meteorites and their accessory minerals. Beside detecting diamonds, he isolated and analyzed an iron carbide mineral there, later named Cohenite for him.

== Publications ==
- Geognostisch-petrographische Skizzen aus Südafrika (1874)
- Erläuternde Bemerkungen zu der Routenkarte einer Reise Lydenburg• nach den Goldfeldern und von Lydenburg nach der Delagoabai im östlichen Südafrika ( 1875)
- Sammlung von Mikrophotographien zur Veranschaulichung der mikroskopischen Struktur von Mineralien und Gesteinen (1881–83; third edition, 1899)
- Meteoritenkunde (second edition, 1903)
- Meteoreisenstudien (1891-1900, eleven numbers)

== See also ==
- Glossary of meteoritics
- Cementite
