= Heptasartorite =

Very rare mineral

General
- Category: Sulfosalt
- Formula: Tl_{7}Pb_{22}As_{55}S_{108}
- IMA symbol: Hsat
- Crystal system: Monoclinic
- Crystal class: Prismatic (2/m) (same H-M symbol)
- Space group: P2_{1}/c
- Unit cell: a = 37.62, b = 7.88, c = 20.07 [Å], β = 101.93° (approximated)

Identification

Heptasartorite is a very rare mineral with formula Tl_{7}Pb_{22}As_{55}S_{108}. It belongs to sartorite homologous series. It is related to other recently approved minerals of the series: enneasartorite and hendekasartorite. All three minerals come from a quarry in Lengenbach, Switzerland, which is famous of thallium minerals. Chemically similar minerals include edenharterite and hutchinsonite.
