= Cementite =

Compound of iron and carbon

Iron carbide
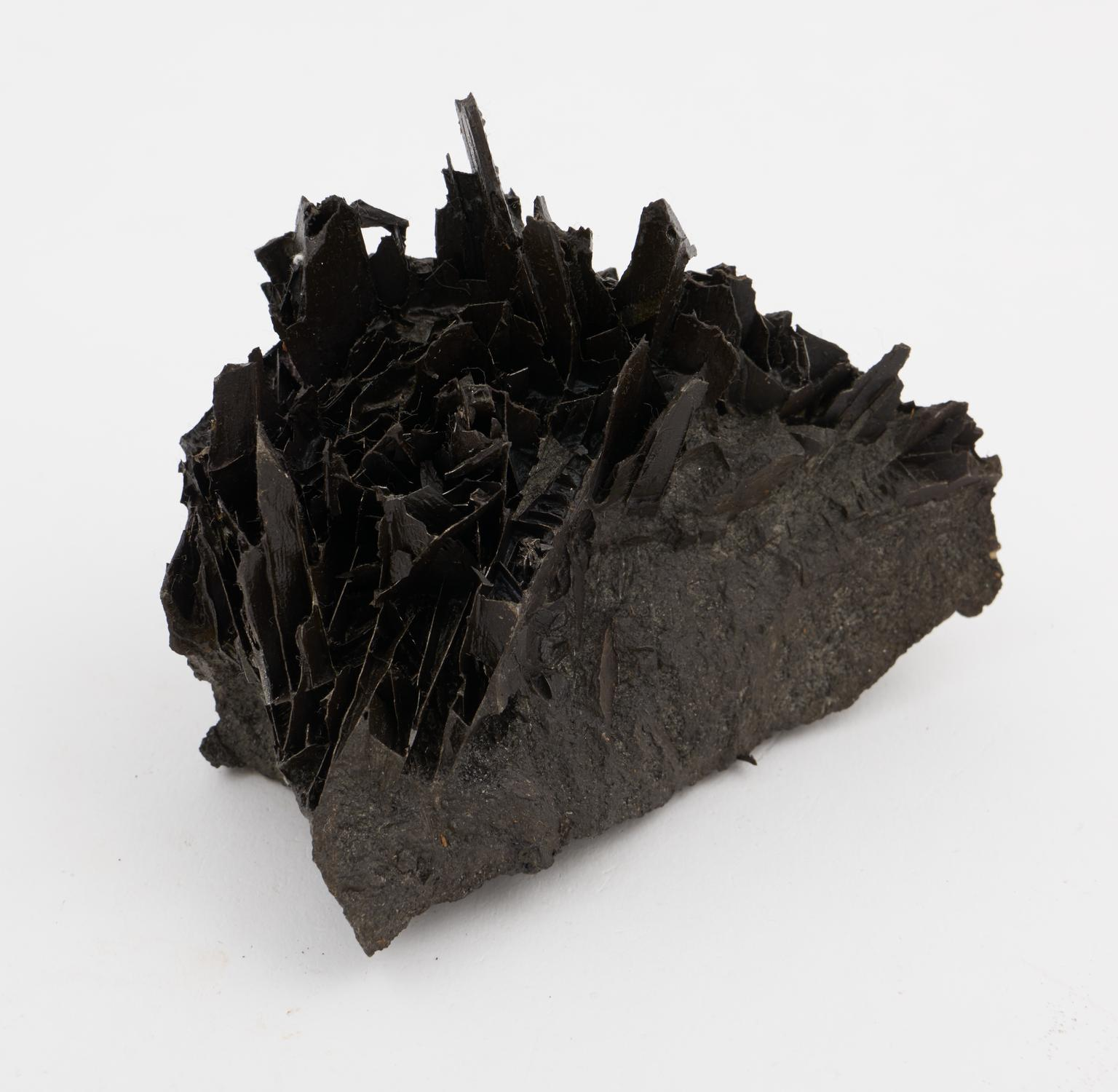
- Iron carbide plates

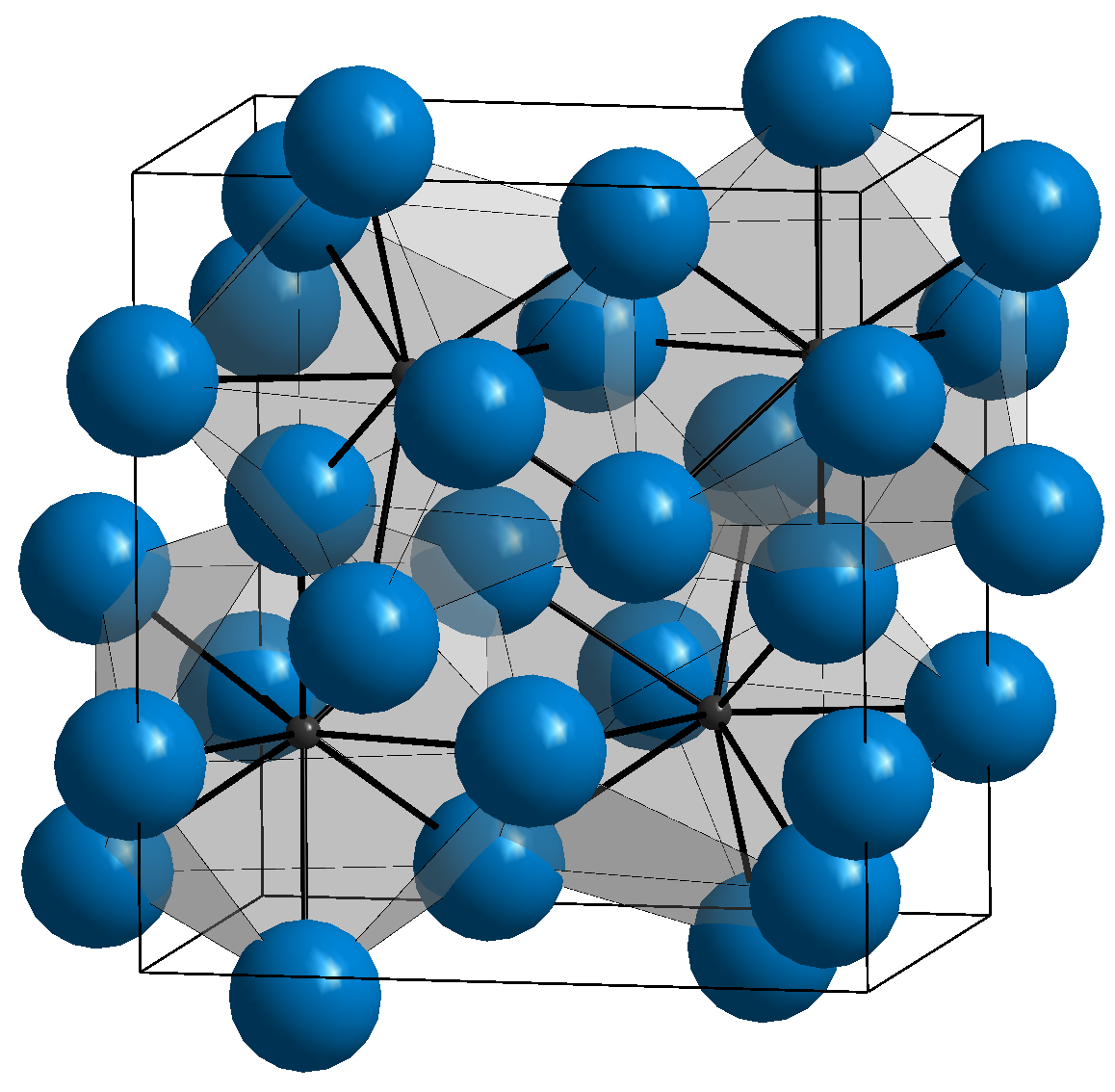
- Orthorhombic Fe_{3}C. Iron atoms are blue

Names
- IUPAC name Iron carbide
- Other names Cementite

Identifiers
CAS Number	12011-67-5
3D model (JSmol)	Interactive image
ECHA InfoCard	100.031.411
EC Number	234-566-7
CompTox Dashboard (EPA)	DTXSID10894255
- InChI: InChI=1S/C.3Fe Key: TXAHJXBWFZQNQY-UHFFFAOYSA-N
- SMILES: [Fe]=[C]=[Fe].[Fe]

Properties
Chemical formula	Fe_{3}C
Molar mass	179.546 g/mol
Appearance	dark gray or black crystals, odorless
Density	7.694 g/cm^{3}, solid
Melting point	1,227 °C (2,241 °F; 1,500 K)
Solubility in water	insoluble

Structure
Crystal structure	Orthorhombic, oP16
Space group	Pnma, No. 62
Lattice constant	a = 0.509 nm, b = 0.6478 nm, c = 0.4523 nm
Formula units (Z)	4

Thermochemistry
Heat capacity (C)	105.9 J·mol^{−1}·K^{−1}
Std molar entropy (S^{⦵}_{298})	104.6 J·mol^{−1}·K^{−1}
Std enthalpy of formation (Δ_{f}H^{⦵}_{298})	25.1 kJ·mol^{−1}
Gibbs free energy (Δ_{f}G^{⦵})	20.1 kJ·mol^{−1}
- Except where otherwise noted, data are given for materials in their standard state (at 25 °C [77 °F], 100 kPa). Infobox references

Cementite (or iron carbide) is a compound of iron and carbon, more precisely an intermediate transition metal carbide with the formula Fe_{3}C. By weight, it is 6.67% carbon and 93.3% iron. It has an orthorhombic crystal structure. It is a hard, brittle material, normally classified as a ceramic in its pure form, and is a frequently found and important constituent in ferrous metallurgy. While cementite is present in most steels and cast irons, it is produced as a raw material in the iron carbide process, which belongs to the family of alternative ironmaking technologies. The name cementite originated from the theory of Floris Osmond and J. Werth, in which the structure of solidified steel consists of a kind of cellular tissue, with ferrite as the nucleus and Fe_{3}C the envelope of the cells. The carbide therefore cemented the iron.

== Metallurgy ==
In the iron–carbon system (i.e. plain-carbon steels and cast irons) it is a common constituent because ferrite can contain at most 0.02% by mass of uncombined carbon. Therefore, in carbon steels and cast irons that are slowly cooled, a portion of the carbon is in the form of cementite. Cementite forms directly from the melt in the case of white cast iron. In carbon steel, cementite precipitates from austenite as austenite transforms to ferrite on slow cooling, or from martensite during tempering. An intimate mixture with ferrite, the other product of austenite, forms a lamellar structure called pearlite.

The iron-carbon phase diagram

While cementite is thermodynamically unstable, eventually being converted to austenite (low carbon level) and graphite (high carbon level) at higher temperatures, it does not decompose on heating at temperatures below the eutectoid temperature (723 °C) on the metastable iron-carbon phase diagram.

Mechanical properties are as follows: room temperature microhardness 760–1350 HV; bending strength 4.6–8 GPa, Young's modulus 160–180 GPa, indentation fracture toughness 1.5–2.7 MPa√m.

The morphology of cementite plays a critical role in the kinetics of phase transformations in steel. The coiling temperature and cooling rate significantly affect cementite formation. At lower coiling temperatures, cementite forms fine pearlitic colonies, whereas at higher temperatures, it precipitates as coarse particles at grain boundaries. This morphological difference influences the rate of austenite formation and decomposition, with fine cementite promoting faster transformations due to its increased surface area and the proximity of the carbide-ferrite interface. Furthermore, the dissolution kinetics of cementite during annealing are slower for coarse carbides, impacting the microstructural evolution during heat treatments.

== Pure form ==
Cementite changes from ferromagnetic to paramagnetic upon heating to its Curie temperature of approximately 480 K (207 °C).

A natural iron carbide (containing minor amounts of nickel and cobalt) occurs in iron meteorites and is called cohenite after the German mineralogist Emil Cohen, who first described it.

== Other iron carbides ==
There are other forms of metastable iron carbides that have been identified in tempered steel and in the industrial Fischer–Tropsch process. These include epsilon (ε) carbide, hexagonal close-packed Fe_{2–3}C, precipitates in plain-carbon steels of carbon content > 0.2%, tempered at 100–200 °C. Non-stoichiometric ε-carbide dissolves above ~200 °C, where Hägg carbides and cementite begin to form. Hägg carbide, monoclinic Fe_{5}C_{2}, precipitates in hardened tool steels tempered at 200–300 °C. It has also been found naturally as the mineral Edscottite in the Wedderburn meteorite.

== Bibliography ==
- Haynes, William M., ed. (2016). CRC Handbook of Chemistry and Physics (97th ed.). CRC Press. ISBN 9781498754293.
- Smith, William F.; Hashemi, Javad (2006). Foundations of Materials Science and Engineering (4th ed.). McGraw-Hill. ISBN 978-0-07-295358-9.
