= Hendekasartorite =

Very rare thallium sulfosalt mineral

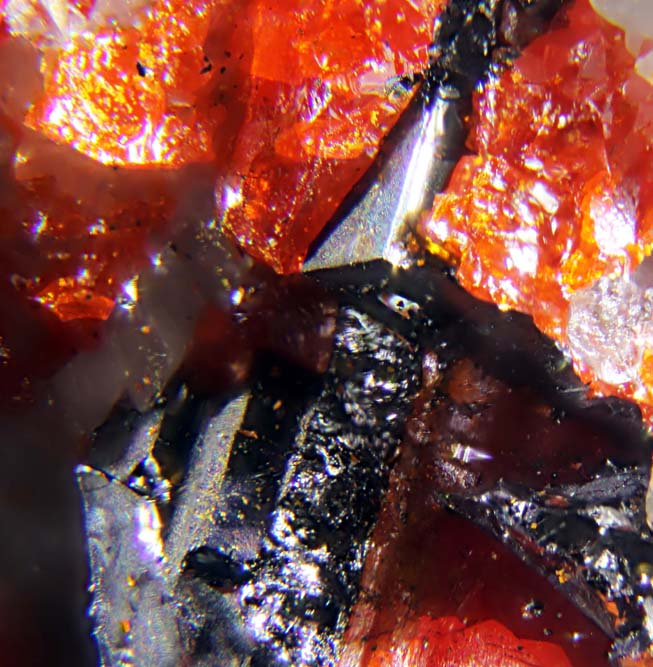
- Hendekasartorite with enneasartorite. These minerals are very similar and often indistinguishable without advanced techniques.

General
- Category: Sulfosalt
- Formula: Tl_{2}Pb_{48}As_{82}S_{172}
- IMA symbol: Hksat
- Strunz classification: Sulfide
- Crystal system: Monoclinic
- Crystal class: Prismatic (2/m) (same H-M symbol)
- Space group: P2_{1}/c
- Unit cell: a = 31.81, b = 7.489 c = 28.56 [Å]; β = 99.03° (approximated)

Identification
- Color: Lead grey, grey
- Cleavage: Distinct/Good (100}
- Fracture: Conchoidal
- Tenacity: Brittle
- Mohs scale hardness: 3 - 3.5
- Luster: Metallic
- Streak: Dark brown
- Birefringence: Weak
- Pleochroism: Weak

Hendekasartorite is a very rare thallium sulfosalt mineral with formula Tl_{2}Pb_{48}As_{82}S_{172}. It is one of recently approved new members of sartorite homologous series, by enneasartorite and heptasartorite. All new members come from Lengenbach quarry in Switzerland, prolific in terms of thallium sulfosalt minerals. Hendekasartorite is chemically similar to edenharterite and hutchinsonite.
