= Hexacelsian =

General
- Category: Silicate
- Formula: BaAl_{2}Si_{2}O_{8}
- IMA symbol: Hcls
- Crystal system: Hexagonal
- Crystal class: Dihexagonal dipyramidal (6/mmm); H-M symbol: (6/m 2/m 2/m)
- Space group: P6_{3}/mcm
- Unit cell: a = 5.29, c = 15.56 [Å] (approximated)

Identification

Hexacelsian is a rare barium silicate mineral with the formula BaAl_{2}Si_{2}O_{8}. It was discovered in the Hatrurim Basin in Israel, where the Hatrurim Formation of rocks formed due to exposed pyrometamorphism.

== Relation to other minerals ==
As suggested by its name, hexacelsian is related to celsian. This relation is polymorphous (celsian, a feldspar-group mineral, is monoclinic). Beside celsian, it is chemically similar to cymrite.
