= Cohenite =

Iron carbide mineral

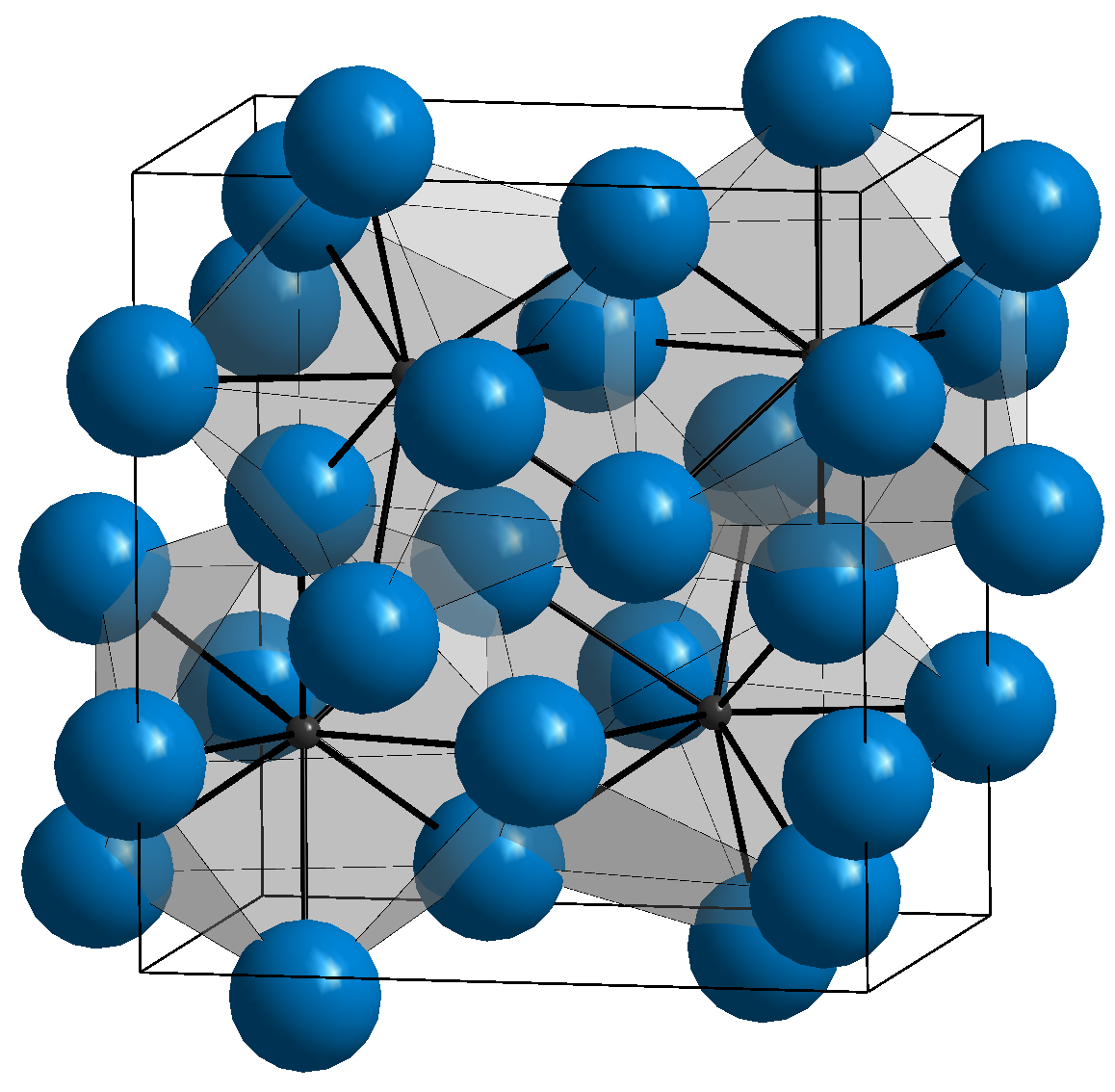
- Structure of cohenite (or cementite)

General
- Category: Native element mineral, carbide
- Formula: (Fe,Ni,Co)_{3}C
- IMA symbol: Coh
- Strunz classification: 1.BA.05
- Crystal system: Orthorhombic
- Crystal class: Dipyramidal (mmm); H-M symbol: (2/m 2/m 2/m)
- Space group: Pnma
- Unit cell: a = 5.09 Å, b = 6.74 Å, c = 4.52 Å; Z = 4

Identification
- Color: Tin-white; oxidizes to light bronze then golden yellow
- Crystal habit: Platy to needlelike crystals; also as rims on or in dendritic intergrowths with iron
- Cleavage: Good on {100}, {010}, and {001}
- Tenacity: Brittle
- Mohs scale hardness: 5.5–6
- Luster: Metallic
- Diaphaneity: Opaque
- Specific gravity: 7.2–7.65
- Other characteristics: Strongly magnetic

Cohenite is a naturally occurring iron carbide mineral with the chemical structure (Fe, Ni, Co)_{3}C. This forms a hard, shiny, silver mineral which was named by E. Weinschenk in 1889 after the German mineralogist Emil Cohen, who first described and analysed material from the Magura meteorite found near Slanica, Žilina Region, Slovakia. Cohenite is found in rod-like crystals in iron meteorites.

On Earth cohenite is stable only in rocks which formed in a strongly reducing environment and contain native iron deposits. Such conditions existed in some places where molten magmas invaded coal deposits, e.g. on Disko Island in Greenland, or at the Bühl near Kassel in Germany.

Associated minerals include native iron, schreibersite, troilite and wüstite.

Similar iron carbides occur also in technical iron alloys and are called cementite.

== See also ==
- Edscottite
- Glossary of meteoritics
- List of minerals
- List of minerals named after people
