= Mendes Pimentel =

- Municipality
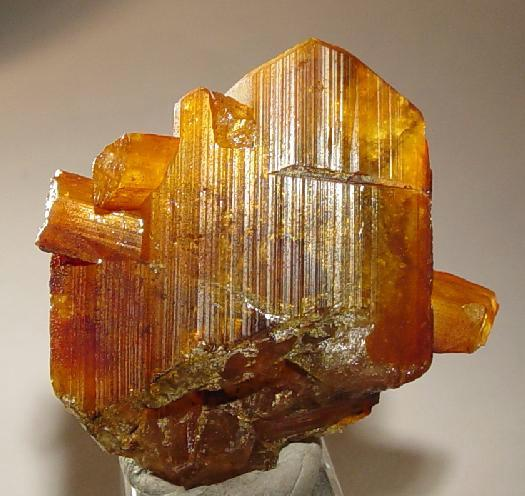
- An eosphorite crystal mined near Mendes Pimentel

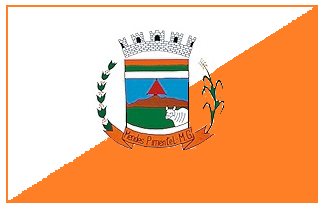
- Flag

- Location in Brazil
- Coordinates: 18°39′39″S 41°24′18″W
- Country: Brazil
- Region: Southeast
- State: Minas Gerais
- Mesoregion: Vale do Rio Doce

Population (2022 Census)
  - Total: 5,606
  - Estimate (2025): 5,614
- Time zone: UTC−3 (BRT)

Mendes Pimentel is a municipality in the state of Minas Gerais in the Southeast region of Brazil.

== See also ==
- List of municipalities in Minas Gerais
