= Wedderburn meteorite =

Iron meteorite discovered in 1951

- Type: Iron
- Group: IAB-sLH
- Country: Australia
- Region: Victoria
- Coordinates: 36°26′S 143°38′E
- Observed fall: No
- Found date: 1951
- TKW: 210 grams (7.4 oz)

The Wedderburn meteorite is an iron meteorite discovered in 1951 near the town of Wedderburn in the state of Victoria, Australia.

In 2019 it was announced that edscottite, a mineral previously not found in nature, had been identified in a sample of the Wedderburn meteorite. It is believed the mineral was created in the core of another planet.
