= Haiweeite =

Mineral of uranium

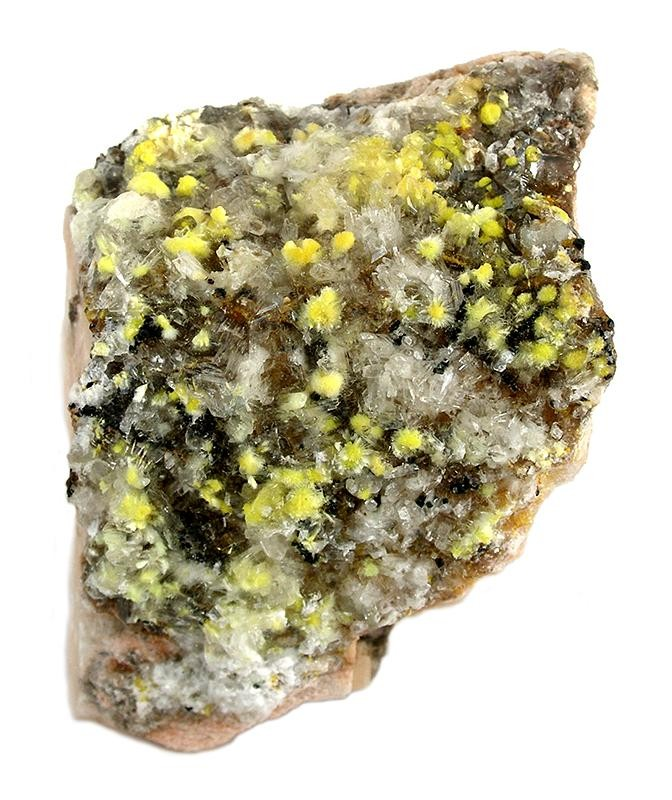

General
- Category: Nesosilicate
- Formula: Ca[(UO_{2})_{2}Si_{5}O_{12}(OH)_{2}]·3(H_{2}O)
- IMA symbol: Hwe
- Strunz classification: 9.AK.25
- Dana classification: 53.3.2.2
- Crystal system: Orthorhombic
- Crystal class: Dipyramidal (mmm)
- Space group: Orthorhombic; H-M symbol: (2/m 2/m 2/m); Space group: Pbcn

Identification
- Other characteristics: Radioactive

Haiweeite is a mineral of uranium and has the chemical formula: Ca[(UO_{2})_{2}Si_{5}O_{12}(OH)_{2}]·3(H_{2}O). It is a secondary mineral of uranium, a product of oxidation. It has a greenish yellow color. It has a Mohs hardness of about 3.5 and is fluorescent under UV light.

It was named after the Haiwee Reservoir, Inyo County, California, US, where it was first found.
