= Heterogenite =

Cobalt oxyhydroxide mineral

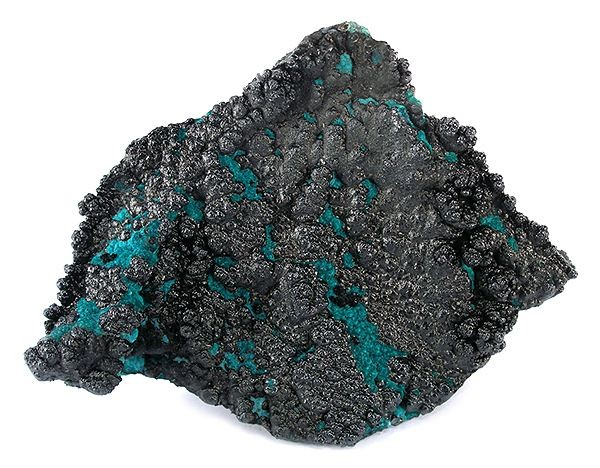

General
- Category: Minerals
- Formula: CoO(OH)
- IMA symbol: Htg
- Strunz classification: 04.FE.20
- Dana classification: 06.01.04.02
- Crystal system: Trigonal or Hexagonal

Identification
- Color: Black, reddish, blackish-brown
- Cleavage: {0001}
- Mohs scale hardness: 4–5
- Density: 4.13 – 4.47, Average = 4.3
- Common impurities: Mn, Ni, Zn, Cu, Fe

Heterogenite is a natural tri-valent cobalt oxyhydroxide mineral. It is the most abundant oxidised cobalt mineral in the Katanga Copperbelt, a region in the Democratic Republic of the Congo. About 70% of known heterogenite is located in the DRC.

The name heterogenite came from Greek, "of another kind", as the mineral differs in composition from similar minerals. Its formation is likely related to the weathering of carrollite (CuCo_{2}S_{4}). In nature it is found coexisting with other minerals like smaltite, pharmacosiderite, calcite, linnaeite, sphaerocobaltite, malachite and cuprite.

== Composition ==
Heterogenite has an average grade of 64.1% cobalt, one of the highest rates among cobalt-containing minerals.

Similar to most oxyhydroxides, heterogenite acts as a chemical 'sponge', trapping many trace elements such as Ni, Zn, V, As, Mo, and Pb. Amongst these trace elements is also uranium, whose concentration in the mineral can be as high as a few percent.

Heterogenite is commonly formulated as CoO(OH) (cobalt(III) oxyhydroxide), though samples may contain Co^{2+} and other metal cations in addition to the Co^{3+}.

== Occurrence ==
Heterogenite is formed by the oxidation of cobalt-sulfides and accumulated as residual deposits during a Pliocene weathering event. Many studies highlight that heterogenite was formed in oxidizing conditions under the surface. In several locations, primary sulfides have been oxidised due to surface weathering down to about 100 meters below the surface, which resulted in significant cobalt enrichment and transformation to oxidic ore minerals, such as heterogenite.

== Treatment ==
The preferred concentration technique for treating heterogenite is surface sulfidation followed by flotation. Sulfidation typically requires sodium sulfide (Na_{2}S), ammonium sulfide (NH_{4})_{2}S), or sodium sulfydrate (NaSH) in order to make heterogenite suitable for collection with sulfydryl-type collectors.
