= Honeaite =

Gold thallium telluride mineral

General
- Category: Telluride
- Formula: Au_{3}TlTe_{2}
- IMA symbol: Hne
- Crystal system: Orthorhombic
- Crystal class: Dipyramidal (mmm)
- Space group: Orthorhombic; H-M symbol: (2/m 2/m 2/m); Space group: Pbcm
- Unit cell: a = 8.97, b = 8.88, c = 7.84 [Å] (approximated); Z = 4

Identification

Honeaite is a rare gold thallium telluride mineral with the formula Au_{3}TlTe_{2}. It was discovered in the Karonie mine, Cowarna Downs Station, Western Australia, although this is not the only locality for the mineral.

== Relation to other minerals ==
Honeaite is structurally and chemically unique.
