= Ephesite =

Phyllosilicate mineral in the trioctahedral mica group

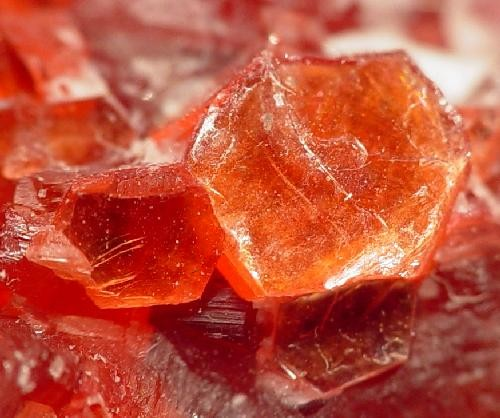

General
- Category: Phyllosilicate minerals
- Group: Mica group, trioctahedral mica group
- Formula: NaLiAl_{2}(Al_{2}Si_{2})O_{10}(OH)_{2}
- IMA symbol: Eph
- Strunz classification: 9.EC.20
- Crystal system: Monoclinic
- Crystal class: Prismatic (2/m) (same H-M symbol)
- Space group: C2/c also reported is a triclinic polytype
- Unit cell: a = 5.12, b = 8.853 c = 19.303 [Å]; beta = 95.08°; Z = 4

Identification
- Color: Brownish pink, pearl gray, pale green
- Crystal habit: Flakes
- Twinning: Commonly twinned about [310] or [31̅0]
- Cleavage: Perfect on {001}
- Tenacity: Brittle
- Mohs scale hardness: 3.5–4
- Luster: Vitreous, pearly on cleavage
- Diaphaneity: Translucent
- Specific gravity: 2.984
- Optical properties: Biaxial (-)
- Refractive index: n_{α} = 1.592 - 1.595 n_{β} = 1.624 - 1.625 n_{γ} = 1.625 - 1.627
- Birefringence: δ = 0.033
- 2V angle: 18° to 28°
- Dispersion: r > v strong

Ephesite is a rare member of the mica silicate mineral group, phyllosilicate. It is restricted to quartz-free, alumina rich mineral assemblages and has been found in South African deposits in the Postmasburg district as well as Ephesus, Turkey.

== Composition ==
Ephesite has an ideal chemical formula of NaLiAl_{2}(Al_{2}Si_{2})O_{10}(OH)_{2.} Ephesite and paragonite are closely related due to their substitution of sodium in place of potassium. The general form of most micas, which can vary such as in the place of ephesite, can be written as W(X,Y)_{2-3}Z_{4}O_{10}(OH,F)_{2} as observed by many sources. In the case of ephesite the W compound is sodium and the (X,Y) is lithium and aluminium, it also bears two hydroxides as the end members.

== Structure ==
Ephesite, a mica structure, arises from the stacking of T-O-T layers along the c-axis direction connected by I-cations where T,O, and I stand for tetrahedral-, octahedral-, and interlayer. Creating long, flat sheets of sodium and lithium rich tetrahedra. Ephesite in particular belongs in the trioctahedral mica subgroup. Micas are determined and named for their end members and species that define a wide range of compositions. Depending on the interlayer cation, the micas are subdivided into true micas (if 50% I cations present are monovalent) or brittle micas ( if > 50% I cations present are divalent). Ephesite with monovalent cations of Na prove to be a true mica and with 2.5 octahedral cations are trioctahedral. Ephesite is classified as an uncommon true non-K mica of which only 2.1% of the micas are categorized.

== Physical properties ==
Ephesite found in its natural state is translucent and pink in color. It has a vitreous luster and pearly on the cleavages. Categorized as a triclinic crystal system and belongs with the point group 1 symmetry elements, this crystal class includes a one-fold rotation with or without inversion. As a group the micas are characterized by their perfect basal cleavage, giving thin, flexible, and elastic cleavage plates. Crystals are usually tabular with prominent basal planes and hexagonal in outline. Ephesite has been found as 2M1 and 1M polytype series and shows perfect cleavage on the {001} axis.

== History ==
The history of study of the mineral ephesite begins with its first appearance in Ephesus, Asia Minor at Gumach Dagh in a deposit also associated with emery discovered by J. Lawrence Smith in 1851. I. Lea in 1867 had discovered a mineral of the same composition which he had been calling under a different name, lesleyite. Later, ephesite was closely compared to a mineral margarite which shared the same composition as ephesite with a substituted Ca for Na. Many times ephesite will be referred to as a soda-margarite for this substitution of sodium. Because of these findings the names ephesite, lesleyite, soda-margarite and potash-margarite have been used synonymously. Derivation of the name ephesite comes from its place of occurrence, Ephesus.
