= Herderite =

Phosphate mineral

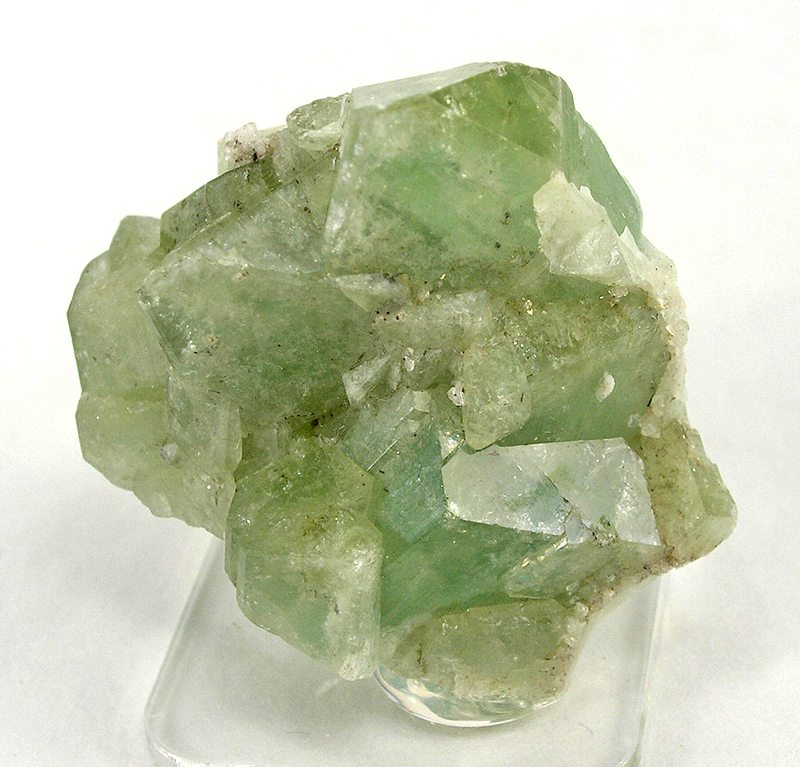

General
- Category: Phosphate mineral
- Formula: CaBe(PO_{4})(F,OH)
- IMA symbol: Hrd
- Strunz classification: 8.BA.10
- Crystal system: Monoclinic
- Crystal class: Prismatic (2/m) (same H-M symbol)
- Space group: P2_{1}/a
- Unit cell: a = 4.81, b = 7.7, c = 9.82 [Å]; β = 90.1°; Z = 4

Identification
- Colour: Colourless, pale yellow, greenish-white
- Crystal habit: Occurs as prismatic tabular crystals, pseudo-orthorhombic or pseudo-hexagonal; fibrous botryoidal to spheroidal aggregates
- Twinning: On {100} or {001} as fishtail contact
- Cleavage: Indistinct on {110}
- Fracture: Subconchoidal
- Mohs scale hardness: 5 - 5.5
- Lustre: Vitreous
- Diaphaneity: Transparent - translucent
- Specific gravity: 3.02
- Optical properties: Biaxial (-)
- Refractive index: n_{α} = 1.556 - 1.592 n_{β} = 1.578 - 1.610 n_{γ} = 1.589 - 1.620
- Birefringence: δ = 0.033
- 2V angle: Calculated: 70°
- Ultraviolet fluorescence: Fluoresces violet under UV; cathodoluminesces and phosphoresces pinkish orange under X-rays

Herderite is a phosphate mineral belonging to the apatite, phosphate group, with formula CaBe(PO_{4})(F,OH). It forms monoclinic crystals, often twinned and variable in colour from colourless through yellow to green. It forms a series with the more common hydroxylherderite, which has more hydroxyl ion than fluoride.

It is found in many parts of the world, often in pegmatites and associated with other apatite minerals.

It was first described in 1828 for an occurrence in the Sauberg Mine, Ore Mountains, Saxony, Germany. It was named for Saxon mining official Sigmund August Wolfgang von Herder (1776–1838).
