= Hydroterskite =

General
- Category: Silicate
- Formula: Na_{2}ZrSi_{6}O_{12}(OH)_{6}
- IMA symbol: Hter
- Crystal system: Orthorhombic
- Crystal class: Dipyramidal (mmm); H-M symbol: (2/m 2/m 2/m)
- Space group: Pnca
- Unit cell: a = 13.96, b = 14.89, c = 7.44 [Å] (approximated), Z = 4

Identification

Hydroterskite is a rare zirconium silicate mineral, related to terskite (hence its name), with the formula Na_{2}ZrSi_{6}O_{12}(OH)_{6}. It was discovered in the Saint-Amable sill near Montréal, Québec, Canada. It is hydrous, when compared to terskite. Chemically similar minerals include litvinskite and kapustinite.
