= Ekplexite =

General
- Category: Sulfide mineral
- Formula: (Nb,Mo)S_{2}•(Mg_{1−x}Al_{x})(OH)_{2+x}
- IMA symbol: Ekp
- Crystal system: Trigonal
- Crystal class: 3m, 32 or 3̅m
- Space group: P321, P3m1, P3̅m1
- Unit cell: a = 3.79, c = 11.3 [Å] (approximated); Z = 2

Identification
- Color: Iron-black
- Crystal habit: micaceous flakes (may be arranged in chaotic or radiating aggregates), in lenticular nests
- Cleavage: {001}, perfect
- Tenacity: Flexible
- Mohs scale hardness: 1
- Luster: Metallic
- Diaphaneity: Opaque
- Density: 3.63
- Pleochroism: light gray to dark gray (strong)
- Common impurities: W, V, Fe

Ekplexite is a unique sulfide-hydroxide niobium-rich mineral with the formula (Nb,Mo)S_{2}•(Mg_{1−x}Al_{x})(OH)_{2+x}. It is unique because niobium is usually found in oxide or, eventually, silicate minerals. Ekplexite is a case in which chalcophile behaviour of niobium is shown, which means niobium present in a sulfide mineral. The unique combination of elements in ekplexite has to do with its name, which comes from a Greek world on "surprise". The other example of chalcophile behaviour of niobium is edgarite, FeNb_{3}S_{6}, and both minerals were found in the same environment, which is a fenitic rock of Mt. Kaskasnyunchorr, Khibiny Massif, Kola Peninsula, Russia. Analysis of the same rock has revealed the presence of two analogues of ekplexite, kaskasite (molybdenum-analogue) and manganokaskasite (molybdenum- and manganese-analogue). All three minerals belong to the valleriite group, and crystallize in the trigonal system with similar possible space groups.

== Notes on chemistry ==
Beside niobium, molybdenum, sulfur, magnesium and aluminium ekplexite contains also relatively small amounts of tungsten, vanadium and iron.

== Association and environment ==
The rock in which contains ekplexite is classified as fenite. In this rock ekplexite associates with fluorophlogopite, nepheline, orthoclase-anorthoclase (silicates), alabandine, edgarite, pyrite, molybdenite, tungstenite (sulfides), corundum, graphite and monazite-(Ce).

== Crystal structure ==
Crystal structure of ekplexite is described as non-commensurate. It is composed of two modules:

- MeS_{2} sulfide module
- brucite-like (hydroxide) module
