= Edscottite =

Iron carbide mineral

Edscottite is an iron carbide mineral, with the formula Fe_{5}C_{2}. It was previously known to occur during iron smelting, but in 2019 was identified as occurring in nature, but not naturally occurring on Earth, when it was discovered in a meteorite.

The source, the Wedderburn meteorite, was found in 1951 just outside Wedderburn in Australia, and is held in the Museums Victoria collection.

During a re-investigation of a section of the meteorite housed at the University of California, Los Angeles, Chi Ma and Alan Rubin verified the presence of a new mineral. They named it edscottite in honor of Edward (Ed) R. D. Scott of the University of Hawaii, USA, a pioneering cosmochemist.

== See also ==
- Glossary of meteoritics
- Cohenite
