= Hutchinsonite =

Mineral

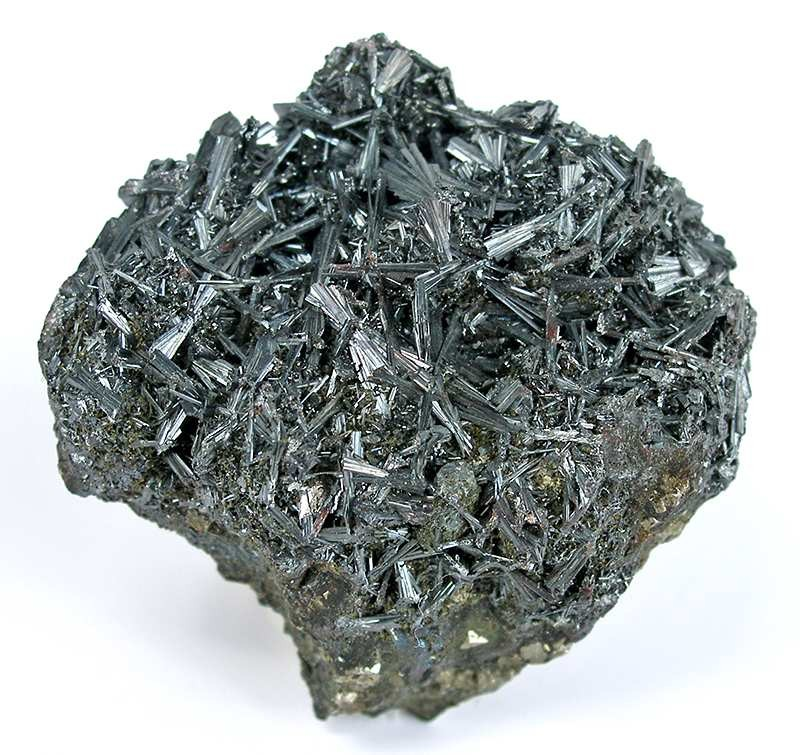
- Hutchinsonite, from Quiruvilca Mine, Santiago de Chuco Province, Peru. Size: 4.5×4.4×2.2 cm

General
- Category: Sulfosalt mineral
- Formula: (Tl,Pb)_{2}As_{5}S_{9}
- IMA symbol: Hut
- Strunz classification: 2.HD.45
- Crystal system: Orthorhombic
- Crystal class: Dipyramidal (mmm); H-M symbol: (2/m 2/m 2/m)
- Space group: Pbca

Identification
- Color: Red, pink, black
- Crystal habit: Acicular – cccurs as needle-like crystals
- Cleavage: {100} good
- Fracture: Very brittle fracture producing small, conchoidal fragments
- Mohs scale hardness: 1.5–2
- Luster: Sub-metallic
- Streak: Red
- Diaphaneity: Subtranslucent to opaque
- Specific gravity: 4.6
- Optical properties: Biaxial (−)
- Refractive index: n_{α} = 3.078 n_{β} = 3.176 n_{γ} = 3.188; 2V = 37°
- Birefringence: δ = 0.110

Hutchinsonite is a sulfosalt mineral of thallium, arsenic and lead with formula (Tl,Pb)_{2}As_{5}S_{9}. Hutchinsonite is a rare hydrothermal mineral.

It was first discovered in a sample from Binnental, Switzerland, in 1903 and named after Cambridge mineralogist Arthur Hutchinson, F.R.S. (1866–1937) in 1904.

== See also ==
- List of minerals
- List of minerals named after people
