= List of minerals recognized by the International Mineralogical Association (G) =

This list includes those recognised minerals beginning with the letter G. The International Mineralogical Association is the international group that recognises new minerals and new mineral names; however, minerals discovered before 1959 did not go through the official naming procedure, although some minerals published previously have been either confirmed or discredited since that date. This list contains a mixture of mineral names that have been approved since 1959 and those mineral names believed to still refer to valid mineral species (these are called "grandfathered" species).

The list is divided into groups:

- Introduction • (Main synonyms)
- A • B • C • D • E • F • G • H • I • J • K • L • M • N • O • P–Q • R • S • T • U–V • W–X • Y–Z

The data was exported from mindat.org on 29 April 2005; updated up to 'IMA2021'.

The minerals are sorted by name, followed by the structural group (rruff.info/ima and ima-cnmnc by mineralienatlas.de, mainly) or chemical class (mindat.org and basics), the year of publication (if it's before of an IMA approval procedure), the IMA approval and the Strunz-mindat code. The first link is to mindat.org, the second link is to webmineral.com, and the third is to the Handbook of Mineralogy (Mineralogical Society of America).

- Abbreviations:
  - ^{D} – discredited (IMA/CNMNC status).
  - ^{Q} – questionable/ doubtful (IMA/CNMNC, mindat.org or mineralienatlas.de status).
  - ^{N} – published without approval of the IMA/CNMNC, or just not an IMA approved mineral but with some acceptance in the scientific community nowadays.
  - ^{I} – intermediate member of a solid-solution series.
  - ^{H} – hypothetical mineral (synthetic, anthropogenic, suspended approval procedure, etc.)
    - ^{ch} – incomplete description, hypothetical solid solution end member.
  - Rd – redefinition of ...
  - "s.p." – special procedure.
  - group – a name used to designate a group of species, sometimes only a mineral group name.
  - no – no link available.
  - IUPAC – chemical name.
  - Y: NNNN – year of publication.
  - Y: old – known before publications were available.

== G ==
=== Ga – Ge ===
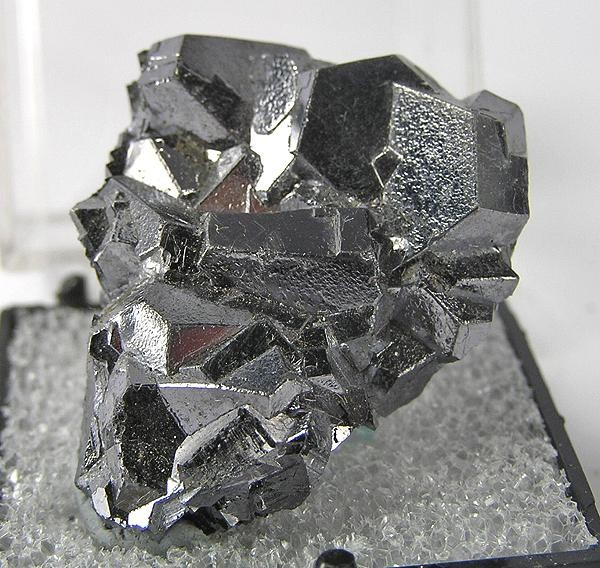
Galena, compound crystal, Naica, Municipio de Saucillo, Chihuahua, Mexico; size: 2.7 x 2.4 x 1.6 cm

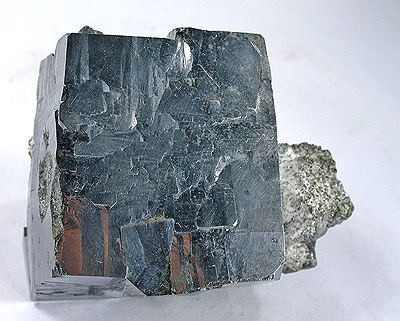
Galena from the Sweetwater Mine, Southeast Missouri Lead District, US; size: 6.9 x 5.4 x 4.2 cm

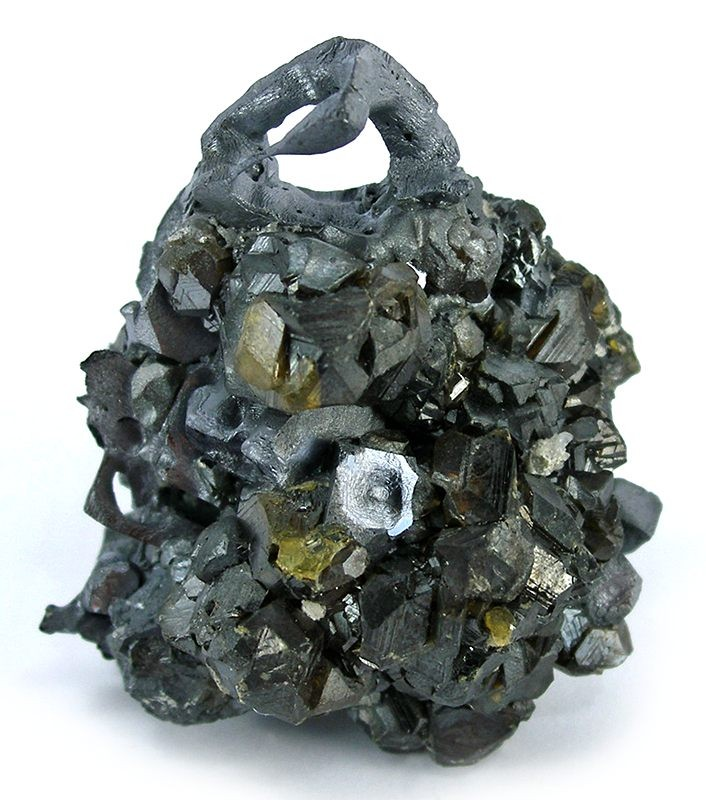
Etched and hollowed-out galena crystals with yellow sphalerite, Septemvri mine, Madan ore field, Rhodope Mountains, Bulgaria; size: 4.4 x 3.9 x 2.2 cm

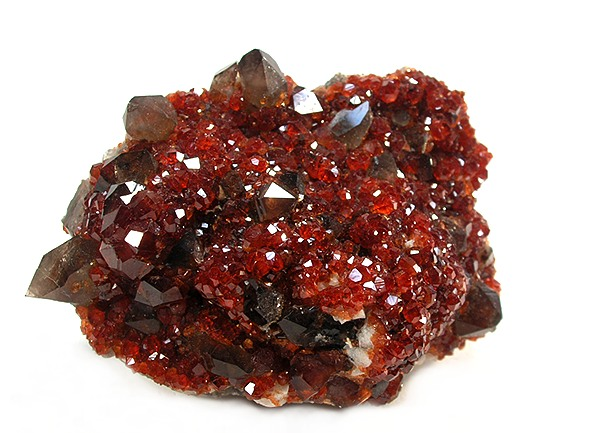
Red garnet with smoky quartz, Lechang Mine, Lechang, Guangdong Province, China; 8.8 x 6.1 x 3.5 cm

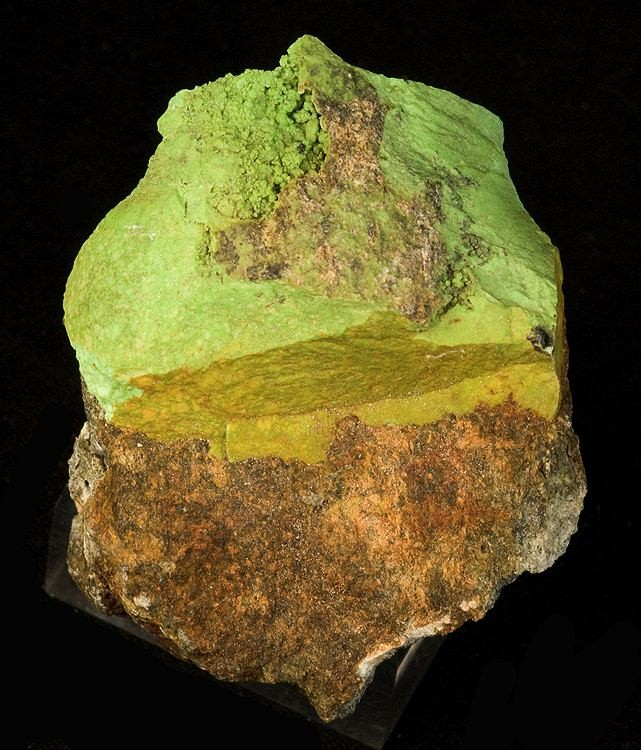
Gaspéite in massive form

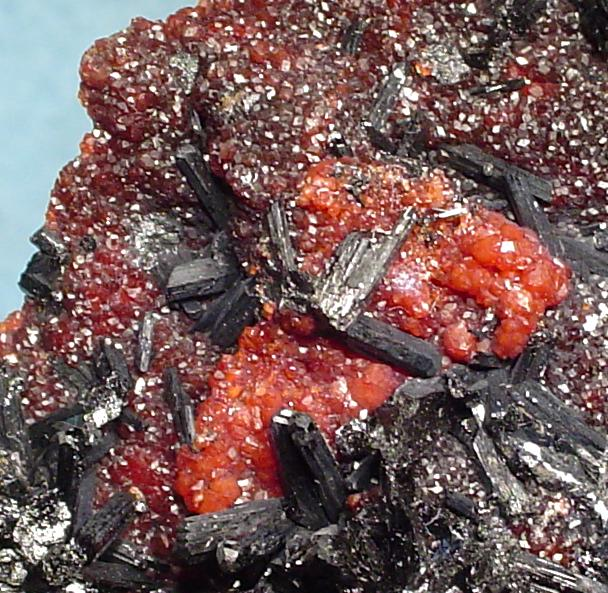
Lustrous, black, hexagonal gaudefroyite prisms to 8 mm, with red andradite and white barite; size: 9.2 x 6.7 x 5.8 cm

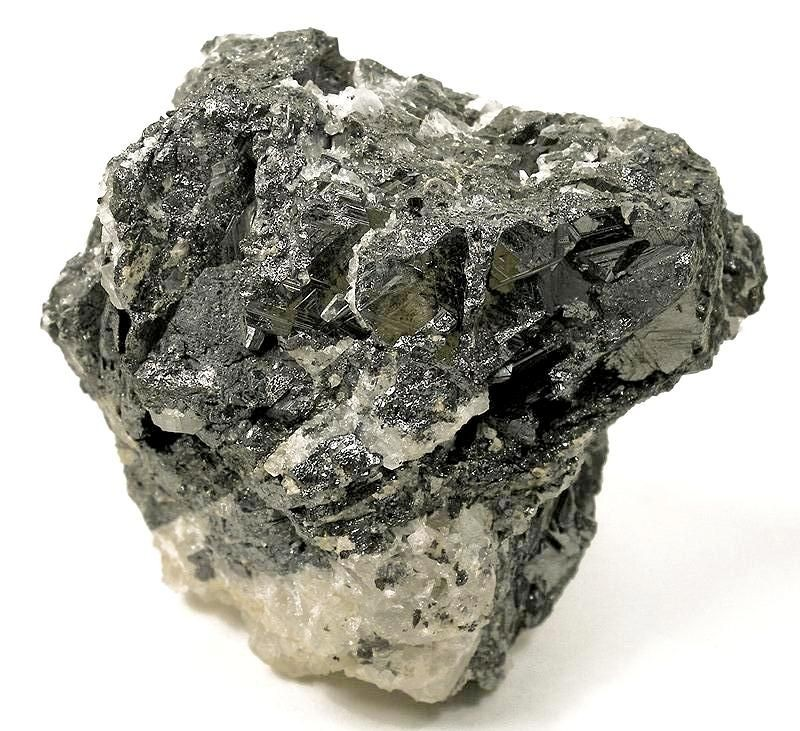
Geikielite with distinct big crystals

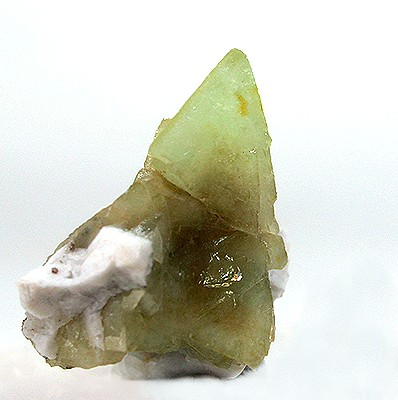
Genthelvite on albite

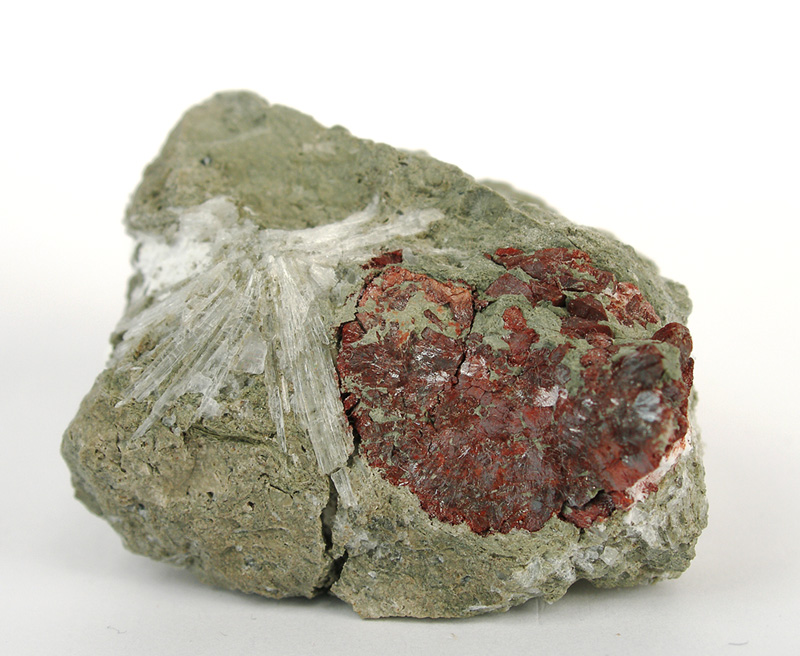
Nodule of crystallized gerstleyite in boron matrix

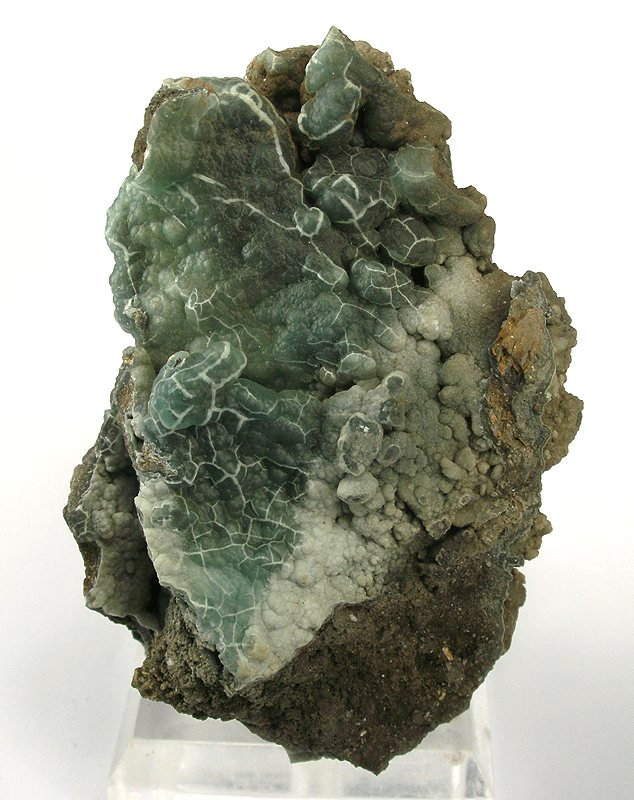
Gibbsite on matrix

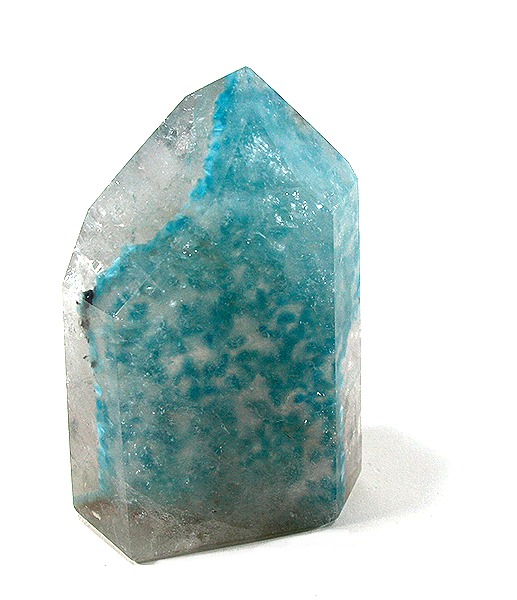
Blue gilalite in quartz, Ceará, Northeast Region, Brazil; 7.1 x 4.7 x 2.7 cm

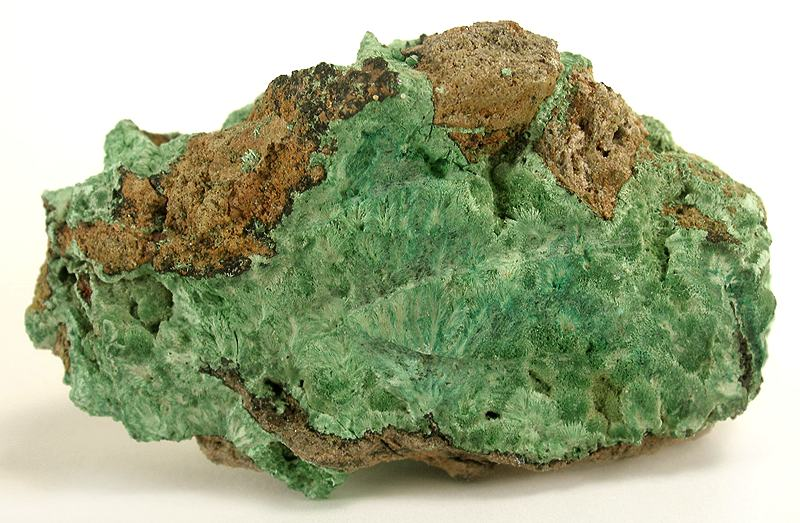
Glaukosphaerite, a rare copper-nickel carbonate, from the Kasompi Mine, former Katanga Province, Democratic Republic of Congo; size: 6.2 x 3.6 x 2.6 cm

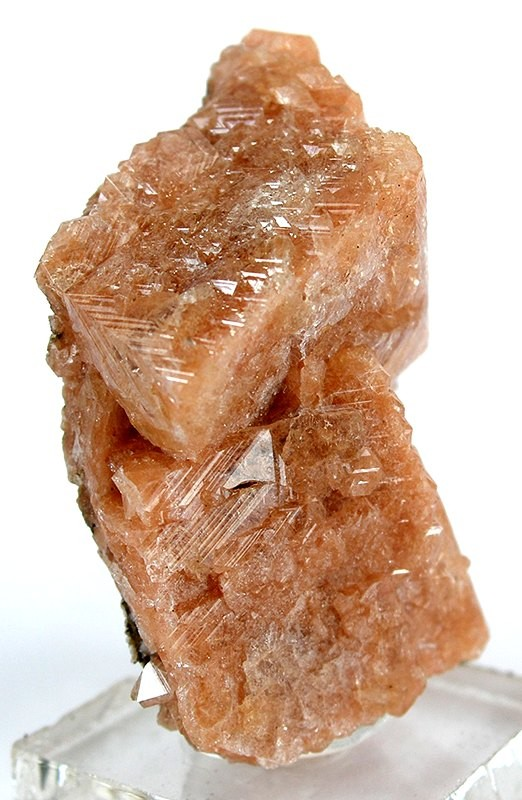
Gmelinite-Na after chabazite, Parrsboro, Bay of Fundy, Nova Scotia, Canada; size: 4.1 x 2.8 x 1.9 cm

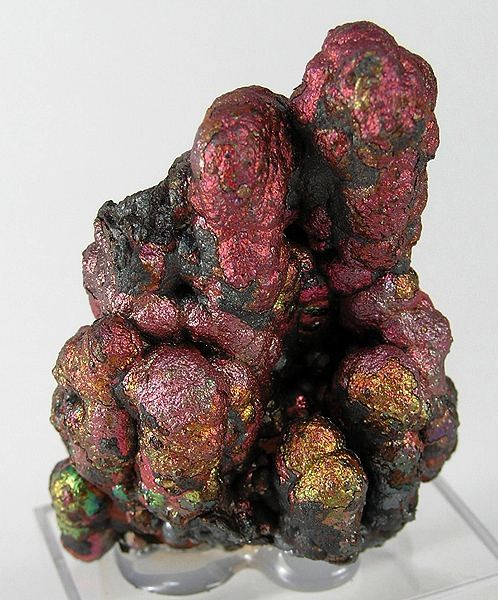
Iridescent goethite, Filón Sur Mine, Tharsis, Huelva, Spain; size: 5.0 x 3.5 x 3.1 cm

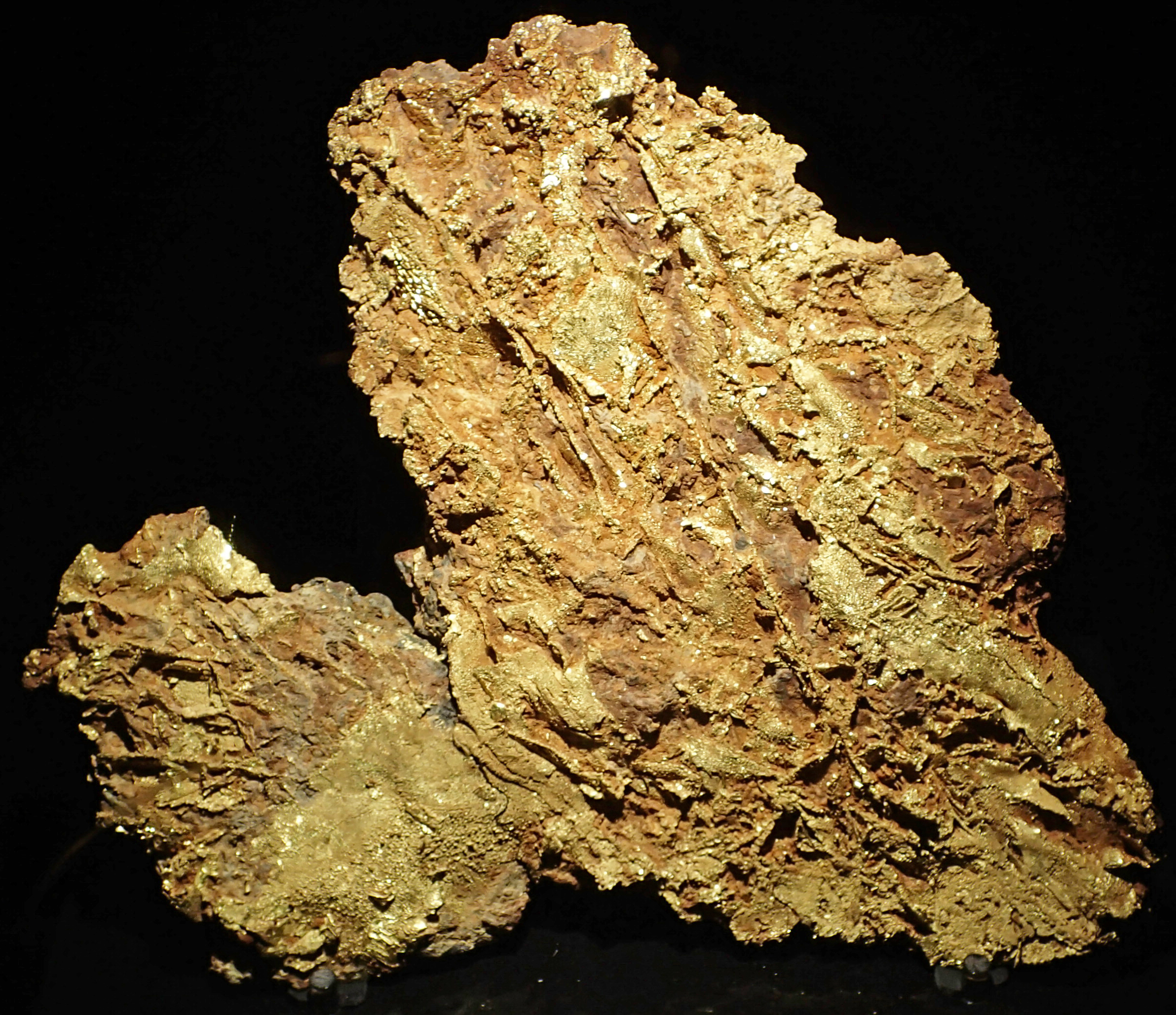
Gold vein stockwork in limonite, from Gold Flake Vein, Farncomb Hill, Breckenridge Mining District, Summit County, Colorado, USA

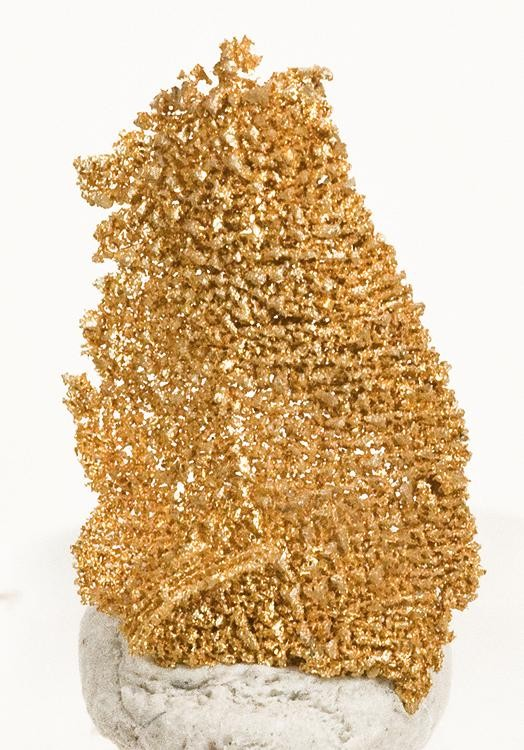
Crystalline gold, Lizard Ridge Mine, Ten Mile District, Humboldt County, Nevada, US; 1.2 x 0.7 x 0.1 cm

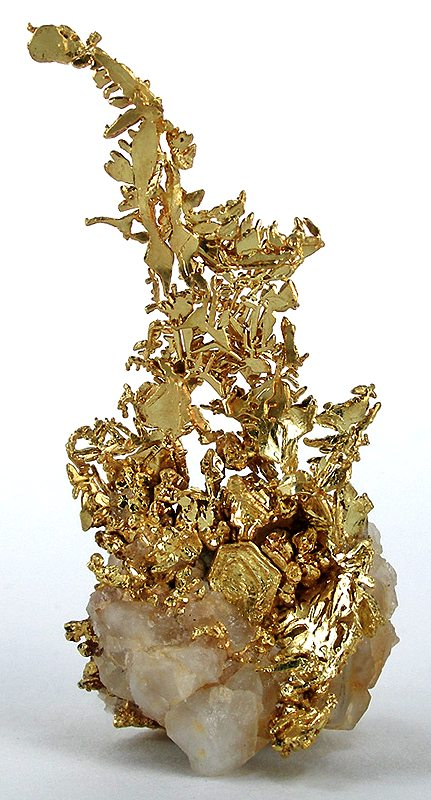
Very fine old California Mother Lode crystalline-gold specimen; 5.3 x 2.7 x 2.4 cm

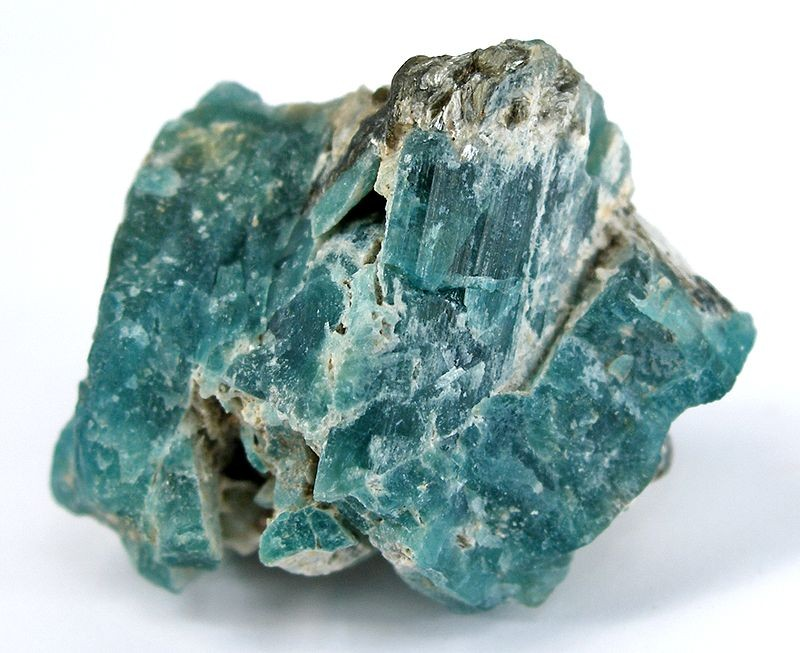
Crystallized example of grandidierite

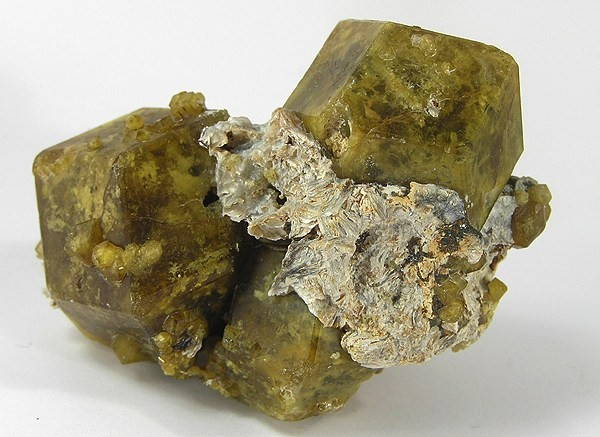
Grossular from Sibinndi, Nioro du Sahel Circle, Kayes Region, Mali

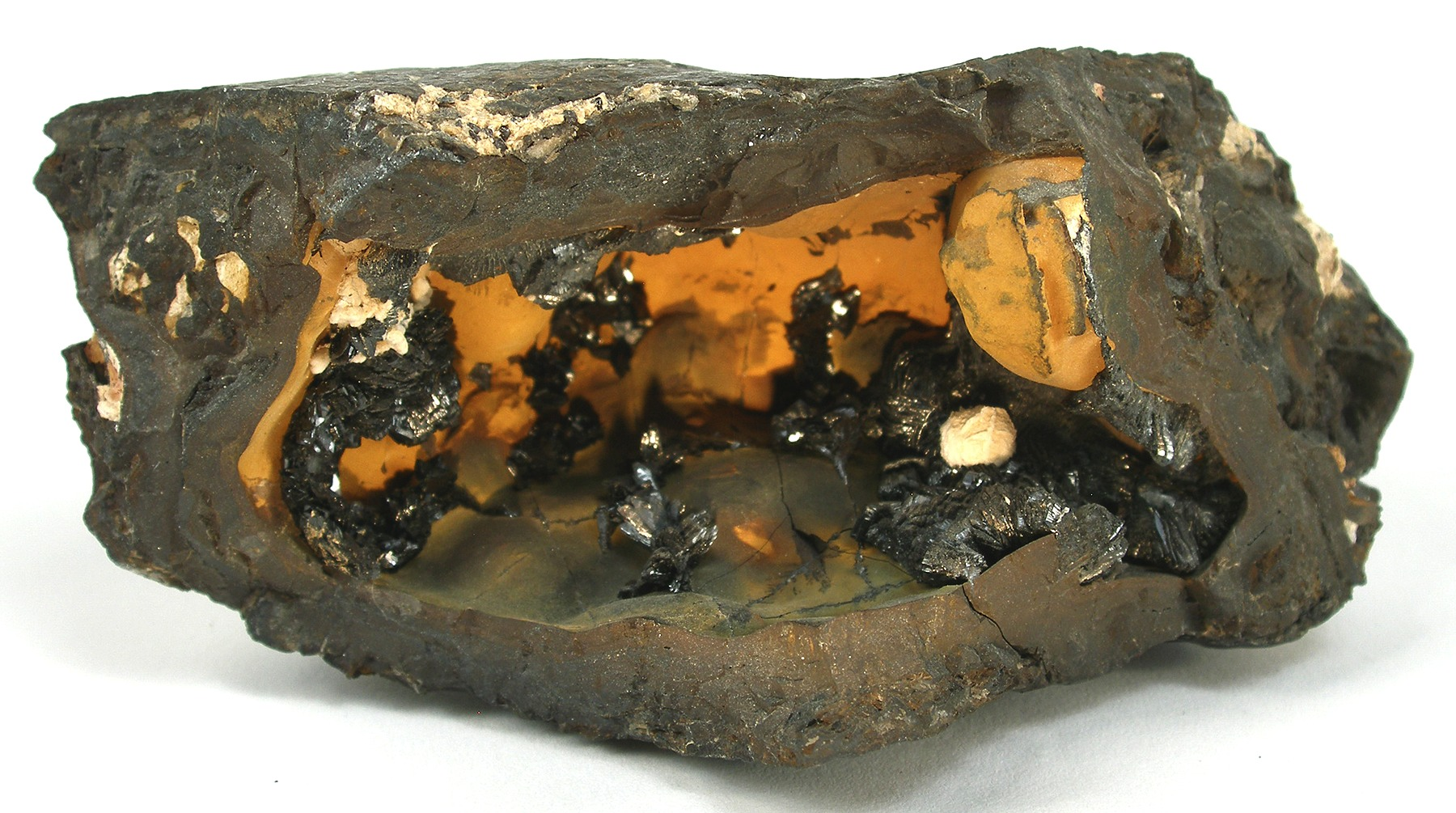
Groutite from Emilie Mine, Peine, Lower Saxony, Germany

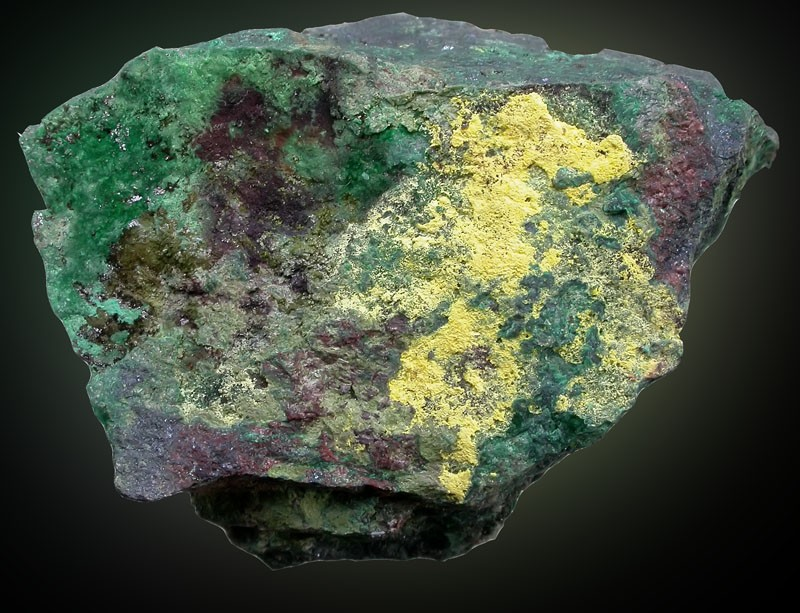
Two very rare selenites, demesmaekerite and yellow guilleminite

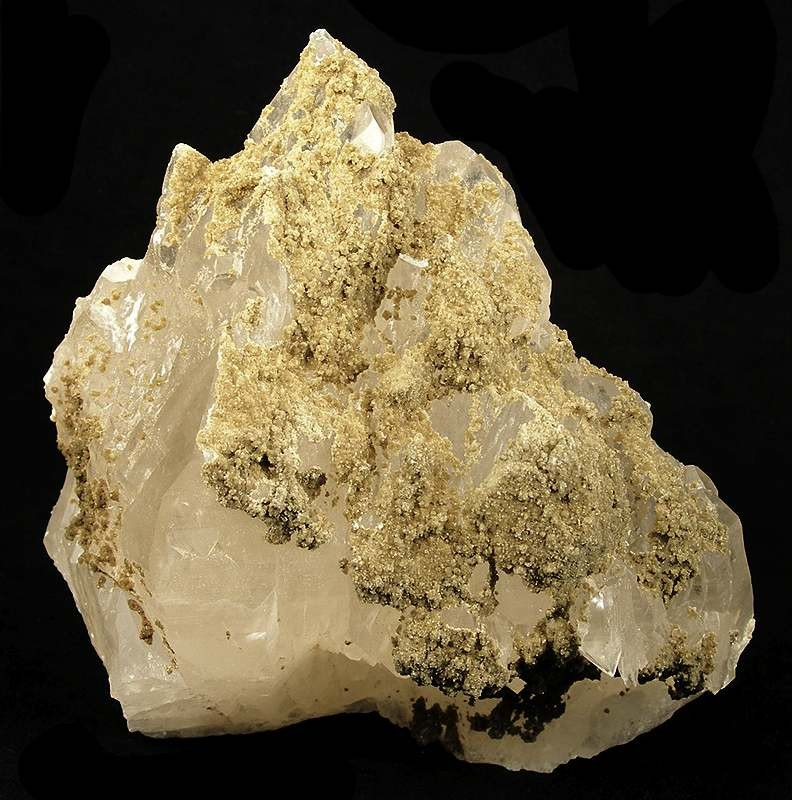
Guimarãesite from Piauí valley, Taquaral, Itinga, Jequitinhonha valley, Minas Gerais, Southeast Region, Brazil

1. Gabrielite (IMA2002-053) 2.HD.60
  (IUPAC: dithallium silver dicopper heptasulfur triarsenide)
2. Gabrielsonite (IMA2017-G, IMA1966-011) 8.BH.35
  (IUPAC: lead iron(III) hydro arsenite)
3. Gachingite (IMA2021-008) [no] [no]
4. Gadolinite 9.AJ.20
  (IUPAC: diREE iron(II) diberyllium dioxy disilicate)
  1. Gadolinite-(Ce) (IMA1987 s.p., 1978) 9.AJ.20
  2. Gadolinite-(Nd) (IMA2016-013) 9.AJ.20 [no] [no]
  3. Gadolinite-(Y) (IMA1987 s.p., 1802) 9.AJ.20
5. Gagarinite (gagarinite) 3.AB.35
  (IUPAC: sodium calcium REE hexafluoride)
  1. Gagarinite-(Ce) (IMA2010-C, IMA1993-038 Rd) 3.AB.35
  2. Gagarinite-(Y) (IMA1967 s.p., 1961) 3.AB.35
6. Gageite (Y: 1910) 9.DH.35
7. Gahnite (spinel, spinel: 1807) 4.BB.05
  (IUPAC: zinc dialuminium tetraoxide)
8. Gaidonnayite (gaidonnayite: IMA1973-008) 9.DM.15
  (IUPAC: disodium zirconium trisilicate nonaoxy hydrate)
9. Gainesite (IMA1978-020) 8.CA.20
10. Gaitite (fairfieldite: IMA1978-047) 8.CG.05
  (IUPAC: dicalcium zinc diarsenate dihydrate)
11. Gajardoite (IMA2015-040) 4.0 [no] [no]
12. Galaxite (spinel, spinel: 1932) 4.BB.05
  (IUPAC: manganese(II) dialuminium tetraoxide)
13. Galeaclolusite (IMA2020-052) 8.DD [no] [no]
14. Galeite (IMA1967 s.p., 1963) 7.BD.10
  (IUPAC: pentadecasodium chloro tetrafluoro pentasulfate)
15. Galena (galena, rocksalt: Pliny the Elder) 2.CD.10
  (IUPAC: lead sulfide)
16. Galenobismutite (kobellite: 1878) 2.JC.25e
  (IUPAC: lead dibismuth tetrasulfide)
17. Galgenbergite-(Ce) (IMA1997-036) 5.CC.40
  (IUPAC: calcium dicerium tetracarbonate monohydrate)
18. Galileiite (fillowite: IMA1996-028) 8.AC.50
  (IUPAC: sodium tetrairon(II) triphosphate)
19. Galkhaite (tennantite: IMA1971-029) 2.GB.20
  (IUPAC: (pentamercury copper) caesium dodecasulfide tetrarsenide)
20. Galliskiite (IMA2009-038) 8.0 [no] [no]
  (IUPAC: tetracalcium dialuminium octafluoro diphosphate pentahydrate)
21. Gallite (chalcopyrite: 1958) 2.CB.10a
  (IUPAC: copper gallium disulfide)
22. Gallobeudantite (beudantite, alunite: IMA1994-021) 8.BL.05
  (IUPAC: lead trigallium hexahydro arsenate sulfate)
23. Galloplumbogummite (alunite, crandallite: IMA2010-088) 8.B?. [no] [no]
24. Galuskinite (IMA2010-075) 9.0 [no]
  (IUPAC: heptacalcium trisilicate carbonate)
25. Gamagarite (brackebuschite: 1943) 8.BG.05
  (IUPAC: dibarium iron(III) hydro divanadate)
26. Gananite (IMA1983-006) 3.AC.20
  (IUPAC: bismuth trifluoride)
27. Ganomalite (ganomalite: 1876) 9.BG.25
  (IUPAC: nonalead hexacalcium tetra(heptaoxodisilicate) oxy(tetraoxysilicate))
28. Ganophyllite (Y: 1890) 9.EG.30
29. Ganterite (mica: IMA2000-033) 9.EC.15
30. Gaotaiite (pyrite: IMA1993-017) 2.EB.05a
  (IUPAC: triiridium octatelluride)
31. Garavellite (berthierite: IMA1978-018) 2.HA.20
  (IUPAC: iron tetrasulfa antimonide bismuthide)
32. Garmite (mica: IMA2017-008) 9.E?. [no] [no]
  (IUPAC: caesium lithium dimagnesium (decaoxytetrasilicate) difluoride)
33. Garpenbergite (IMA2020-099) [no] [no]
34. Garrelsite (Y: 1955) 9.AJ.15
35. Garronite (zeolitic tectosilicate) 9.GC.05
  1. Garronite-Ca (IMA1997 s.p., 1962) 9.GC.05
  2. Garronite-Na (IMA2015-15) 9.GC.05 [no]
36. Gartrellite (tsumcorite: IMA1988-039 Rd) 8.CG.20
  (IUPAC: lead copper iron(III) hydro diarsenate monohydrate)
37. Garutiite (alloy: IMA2008-055) 1.AG.05 [no]
  (IUPAC: (nickel,iron,iridium) alloy)
38. Garyansellite (reddingite: IMA1981-019) 8.CC.05
  (IUPAC: dimagnesium iron(III) hydro diphosphate dihydrate)
39. Gasparite (monazite) 8.AD.50
  (IUPAC: REE arsenate)
  1. Gasparite-(Ce) (IMA1986-031) 8.AD.50
  2. Gasparite-(La) (IMA2018-079) 8.AD.50 [no] [no]
40. Gaspéite (calcite: IMA1965-029) 5.AB.05 Gaspéite Gaspeite Mineral Data
  (IUPAC: nickel carbonate)
41. Gatedalite (braunite: IMA2013-091) 9.A?. [no] [no]
  (IUPAC: zirconium dimanganese(II) tetramanganese(III) octaoxy tetraoxysilicate)
42. Gatehouseite (arsenoclasite: IMA1992-016) 8.BD.10 Gatehouseite Gatehouseite Mineral Data
  (IUPAC: pentamanganese tetrahydro diphosphate)
43. Gatelite-(Ce) (gatelite: IMA2001-050) 9.BG.50 [no]
44. Gatewayite (polyoxometalate: IMA2014-096) 4.0 [no] [no]
45. Gatumbaite (IMA1976-019) 8.DJ.10 Gatumbaite Mineral Data
  (IUPAC: calcium dialuminium dihydro diphosphate monohydrate)
46. Gaudefroyite (IMA1964-006) 6.AB.60 Gaudefroyite Mineral Data
  (IUPAC: tetracalcium trimanganese(III) trioxo triborate carbonate)
47. Gaultite (zeolitic tectosilicate: IMA1992-040) 9.GF.20 Gaultite Mineral Data [no]
48. Gauthierite (IMA2016-004) 4.0 Gauthierite [no] [no]
  (IUPAC: potassium lead heptauranyl heptahydro pentoxide octahydrate)
49. Gayite (dufrenite: IMA2008-056) 8.DK.15 Gayite [no] [no]
  (IUPAC: sodium manganese(II) pentairon(III) hexahydro tetraphosphate diphosphate)
50. Gaylussite (Y: 1826) 5.CB.35
  (IUPAC: disodium calcium dicarbonate pentahydrate)
51. Gazeevite (zadovite, arctite: IMA2015-037) 9.0 [no] [no]
  (IUPAC: barium hexacalcium di(tetraoxysilicate) oxo(disulfate))
52. Gearksutite (IMA1962 s.p., 1868) 3.CC.05
  (IUPAC: calcium hydro tetrafluoroaluminate monohydrate)
53. Gebhardite (IMA1979-071) 4.JB.50
  (IUPAC: octalead hexachloro di(pentoxydiarsenic) oxide)
54. Gedrite [Mg-Fe-Mn-amphibole: IMA2012 s.p., 1836] 9.DD.05
55. Geerite (IMA1978-024) 2.BA.05
  (IUPAC: octacopper pentasulfide)
56. Geffroyite (pentlandite: IMA1980-090) 2.BB.15
57. Gehlenite (melilite: 1815) 9.BB.10
  (IUPAC: dicalcium aluminium (heptaoxyalumosilicate))
58. Geigerite (lindackerite: IMA1985-028) 8.CE.05 Geigerite Mineral Data
  (IUPAC: pentamanganese(II) diarsenate di(hydrogenarsenate) decahydrate)
59. Geikielite (corundum: 1893) 4.CB.05 Geikielite Mineral Data
  (IUPAC: magnesium titanium trioxide)
60. Gelosaite (gelosaite: IMA2009-022) 7.0 [no] [no]
61. Geminite (IMA1988-045) 8.CB.30 Geminite Mineral Data
  (IUPAC: copper(II) hydroxoarsenate monohydrate)
62. Gengenbachite (IMA2001-003b) 8.CA.65 [no]
  (IUPAC: potassium triiron(III) di(dihydroxophosphate) tetrahydroxophosphate hexahydrate)
63. Genkinite (IMA1976-051) 2.AC.35a
  (IUPAC: tetraplatinum triantimonide)
64. Genplesite (fleischerite: IMA2014-034) 7.0 [no] [no]
  (IUPAC: tricalcium tin hexahydro disulfate trihydrate)
65. Genthelvite (cancrinite-sodalite: 1892) 9.FB.10
  (IUPAC: triberyllium tetrazinc trisilicate sulfide)
66. Geocronite (geocronite: 1839) 2.JB.30a
67. Georgbarsanovite (eudialyte: IMA2003-013) 9.CO.10
68. Georgbokiite (IMA1996-015) 4.JG.05
  (IUPAC: pentacopper dioxo dichloro diselenite)
69. Georgechaoite (IMA1984-024) 9.DM.15
  (IUPAC: potassium sodium zirconium nonaoxytrisilicate dihydrate)
70. George-ericksenite (IMA1996-049) 4.KD.10
  (IUPAC: hexasodium calcium magnesium hexaiodate dichromate dodecahydrate)
71. Georgeite (amorphous: IMA1977-004 Rd) 5.BA.10
  (IUPAC: dicopper dihydro carbonate)
72. Georgerobinsonite (IMA2009-068) 7.0 [no] [no]
  (IUPAC: tetralead dihydro fluoro chloro dichromate)
73. Georgiadesite (Y: 1907) 4.JB.70
  (IUPAC: tetralead tetrachloro hydro arsenite)
74. Gerasimovskite (Y: 1957) 4.FM.25
  (IUPAC: manganese(II) penta(titanium,niobium) dodecaoxide nonahydrate(?))
75. Gerdtremmelite (IMA1983-049a) 8.BE.40
  (IUPAC: zinc dialuminium pentahydro arsenate)
76. Gerenite-(Y) (IMA1993-034) 9.CJ.45 [no]
77. Gerhardtite (Y: 1885) 5.NB.05
  (IUPAC: dicopper trihydro nitrate)
78. Germanite (germanite: 1922) 2.CB.30
  (IUPAC: tridecacopper diiron digermanium hexadecasulfide)
79. Germanocolusite (germanite: IMA1991-044) 2.CB.30
  (IUPAC: tridecacopper vanadium trigermanium hexadecasulfide)
80. Gersdorffite (IMA1986 s.p., 1845 Rd) 2.EB.25
  (IUPAC: nickel arsenide sulfide)
  Polytypes: Pa3 (pyrite group), P2_{1}3 (ullmannite group), Pca2_{1} (cobaltite group)
81. Gerstleyite (Y: 1956) 2.HE.05
  (IUPAC: disodium octa(antimonide,arsenide) tridecasulfide dihydrate)
82. Gerstmannite (IMA1975-030) 9.AE.25
  (IUPAC: manganese(II) magnesium zinc tetraoxysilicate tetrahydroxyl)
83. Geschieberite (IMA2014-006) 7.0 [no] [no]
  (IUPAC: dipotassium uranyl disulfate dihydrate)
84. Getchellite (IMA1965-010) 2.FA.35
  (IUPAC: antimony arsenide trisulfide)
85. Geversite (pyrite: IMA1967 s.p., 1961) 2.EB.05a
  (IUPAC: platinum diantimonide)

=== Gh – Gy ===
1. Ghiaraite (IMA2012-072) 3.0 [no] [no]
  (IUPAC: calcium dichloride tetrahydrate)
2. Giacovazzoite (IMA2018-165) 7.0 [no] [no]
3. Gianellaite (IMA1972-020) 3.DD.30
  (IUPAC: hydrous di(dimercury nitride) sulfate)
4. Gibbsite (IMA1962 s.p., 1822) 4.FE.10
  (IUPAC: aluminium trihydroxide)
5. Giessenite (kobellite: IMA1963-004) 2.HB.10b
6. Giftgrubeite (hureaulite: IMA2016-102) 8.0 [no] [no]
  (IUPAC: calcium dimanganese dicalcium diarsenate di(hydroxoarsenate) tetrahydrate)
7. Gilalite (IMA1979-021) 9.HE.05
  (Cu_{5}Si_{6}O_{17}·7H_{2}O)
8. Gillardite (atacamite: IMA2006-041) 3.DA.10c [no]
  (IUPAC: tricopper(II) nickel dichloride hexahydroxide)
9. Gillespite (gillespite: 1922) 9.EA.05
  (BaFe^{2+}Si_{4}O_{10})
10. Gillulyite (IMA1989-029) 2.JC.10
  (Tl_{2}As_{7.5}Sb_{0.3}S_{13})
11. Gilmarite (gilmarite: IMA1996-017) 8.BE.25
  (IUPAC: tricopper(II) trihydro arsenate)
12. Giniite (IMA1977-017) 8.DB.50
  (IUPAC: iron(II) tetrairon(III) dihydro tetraphosphate dihydrate)
13. Ginorite (Y: 1934) 6.FC.15
  (Ca_{2}B_{14}O_{20}(OH)_{6}·5H_{2}O)
14. Giorgiosite^{Q} (Y: 1879) 5.DA.05
15. Giraudite-(Zn) (tetrahedrite: IMA2018-K, IMA1980-089) 2.GB.05
  (Cu_{6}(Cu_{4}Zn_{2})As_{4}Se_{13})
16. Girvasite (IMA1988-046) 8.DO.05
  (NaCa_{2}Mg_{3}(PO_{4})_{2}[PO_{2}(OH)_{2}](CO_{3})(OH)_{2}·4H_{2}O)
17. Gismondine (zeolitic tectosilicate) 9.GC.05
  1. Gismondine-Ba^{H} (2001) 9.GC.05 [no] [no]
  2. Gismondine-Ca (IMA1997 s.p., 1817) 9.GC.05
  3. Gismondine-Sr (IMA2021-043) 9.GC.05 [no] [no] [no]
18. Gittinsite (thortveitite: IMA1979-034) 9.BC.05
  (IUPAC: calcium zirconium heptaoxo disilicate)
19. Giuseppettite (cancrinite-sodalite: IMA1979-064) 9.FB.05
20. Gjerdingenite (labuntsovite) 9.CE.30c
  1. Gjerdingenite-Ca (IMA2005-029) 9.CE.30c
  2. Gjerdingenite-Fe (IMA2001-009) 9.CE.30c [no]
  3. Gjerdingenite-Mn (IMA2003-015) 9.CE.30c [no]
  4. Gjerdingenite-Na (IMA2005-030) 9.CE.30c
21. Gladite (meneghinite: 1924) 2.HB.05a
  (CuPbBi_{5}S_{9})
22. Gladiusite (IMA1998-011) 8.DF.40
  (IUPAC: diiron(III) tetrairon(II) undecahydro phosphate monohydrate)
23. Gladkovskyite (IMA2018-098) 2.0 [no] [no]
  (MnTlAs_{3}S_{6})
24. Glagolevite (IMA2001-064) 9.EC.55 [no]
25. Glauberite (Y: 1808) 7.AD.25
  (IUPAC: disodium calcium disulfate)
26. Glaucocerinite (hydrotalcite: 1932) 7.DD.35
27. Glaucochroite (olivine: 1899) 9.AC.05
  (IUPAC: calcium manganese(II) tetraoxysilicate)
28. Glaucodot (arsenopyrite: 1849) 2.EB.10c
  ((Co_{0.5}Fe_{0.5})AsS)
29. (Glauconite, mica series (Y: 1927) 9.EC. )
30. Glaucophane [Na-amphibole: IMA2012 s.p., 1845] 9.DE.25
31. Glaukosphaerite (malachite: IMA1972-028) 5.BA.10
  (IUPAC: copper nickel dihydro carbonate)
32. Glikinite (IMA2018-119) 7.0 [no] [no]
  (IUPAC: trizinc oxo(disulfate))
33. Glucine (IMA1967 s.p., 1963) 8.DA.45
  (CaBe_{4}(PO_{4})_{2}(OH)_{4}·0.5H_{2}O)
34. Glushinskite (humboldtine: IMA1985-Q Rd) 10.AB.10
  (IUPAC: magnesium oxalate dihydrate)
35. Gmalimite (djerfisherite: IMA2019-007) 2.0 [no] [no]
  (K_{6}☐Fe^{2+}_{24}S_{27})
36. Gmelinite (zeolitic tectosilicate) 9.GD.05
  1. Gmelinite-Ca (IMA1997 s.p.) 9.GD.05 [no]
  2. Gmelinite-K (IMA1999-039) 9.GD.05 [no]
  3. Gmelinite-Na (IMA1997 s.p., 1825) 9.GD.05
37. Gobbinsite (zeolitic tectosilicate: IMA1980-070) 9.GC.05
38. Gobelinite (ktenasite: IMA2018-167) 7.0 [no] [no]
  (IUPAC: cobalt tetracopper hexahydro disulfate hexahydrate)
39. Godlevskite (pentlandite: IMA1968-032) 2.BB.15
  (IUPAC: nona(nickel,iron) octasulfide)
40. Godovikovite (sabieite: IMA1987-019) 7.AC.20
  (IUPAC: ammonium aluminium disulfate)
41. Goedkenite (brackebuschite: IMA1974-004) 8.BG.05
  (IUPAC: distrontium aluminium hydro diphosphate)
42. Goethite ("O(OH)" group: IMA1980 s.p., 1919) 4.F
  (IUPAC: hydro α-iron(III) oxide)
43. Gold (element: old) 1.AA.05
44. Goldfieldite (tetrahedrite: IMA2018-K, 1909 Rd) 2.GB.05
  ((Cu_{4}☐_{2})Cu_{6}Te_{4}S_{13})
45. Goldhillite (IMA2021-034) [no] [no]
46. Goldichite (Y: 1955) 7.CC.40
  (IUPAC: potassium iron(III) disulfate tetrahydrate)
47. Goldmanite (garnet, garnet: IMA1963-003) 9.AD.25
  (IUPAC: tricalcium divanadium(III) tri(tetraoxysilicate))
48. Goldquarryite (IMA2001-058) 8.DB.65 [no]
  (IUPAC: copper dicadmium trialuminium trifluoro tetraphosphate decahydrate)
49. Goldschmidtite (perovskite: IMA2018-034) 4.C [no] [no]
  (IUPAC: potassium niobium trioxide)
50. Golyshevite (eudialyte: IMA2004-039) 9.CO.10
51. Gonnardite (zeolitic tectosilicate: IMA1997 s.p., 1896 Rd) 9.GA.05
52. Gonyerite (chlorite: 1955) 9.EC.55
53. Goosecreekite (zeolitic tectosilicate: IMA1980-004) 9.GB.25
54. Gorbunovite (mica: IMA2017-040) 9.E?. [no] [no]
55. Gorceixite (alunite, crandallite: 1906) 8.BL.10
  (IUPAC: barium trialuminium hexahydro phosphate hydroxophosphate)
56. Gordaite (ktenasite: IMA1996-006) 7.DF.50
  (IUPAC: sodium tetrazinc hexahydro chloro sulfate hexahydrate)
57. Gordonite (laueite, laueite: 1930) 8.DC.30
  (IUPAC: magnesium dialuminium dihydro diphosphate octahydrate)
58. Gorerite (magnetoplumbite: IMA2019-080) 4.0 [no] [no]
59. Görgeyite (Y: 1953) 7.CD.30
  (IUPAC: dipotassium pentacalcium hexasulfate monohydrate)
60. Gormanite (souzalite: IMA1977-030) 8.DC.45
  (IUPAC: triiron(II) tetraluminium hexahydro tetraphosphate dihydrate)
61. Gortdrumite (IMA1979-039) 2.BD.10
  (Cu_{24}Fe_{2}Hg_{9}S_{23})
62. Goryainovite (IMA2015-090) 8.0 [no] [no]
  (IUPAC: dicalcium phosphate chloride)
63. Goslarite (epsomite: 1845) 7.CB.40
  (IUPAC: zinc sulfate heptahydrate)
64. Gottardiite (zeolitic tectosilicate: IMA1994-054) 9.GF.10 [no]
65. Gottlobite (adelite: IMA1998-066) 8.BH.35 [no]
  (IUPAC: calcium magnesium hydro vanadate)
66. Götzenite (seidozerite, rinkite: IMA1962 s.p., 1957) 9.BE.22
  (Ca_{4}NaCa_{2}Ti(Si_{2}O_{7})_{2}(OF)F_{2})
67. Goudeyite (mixite: IMA1978-015) 8.DL.15
  (IUPAC: hexacopper aluminium hexahydro triarsenate trihydrate)
68. Gowerite (IMA1962 s.p., 1959) 6.EC.10
  (Ca[B_{5}O_{8}(OH)][B(OH)_{3}]·3H_{2}O)
69. Goyazite (alunite, crandallite: IMA1999 s.p., 1884 Rd) 8.BL.10
  (IUPAC: strontium trialuminium hexahydro phosphate hydroxophosphate hydrate)
70. Graemite (tellurite: IMA1974-022) 4.JM.15
  (IUPAC: copper(II) tellurite monohydrate)
71. Graeserite (IMA1996-010) 4.JB.55 [no]
  (Fe^{3+}_{4}Ti_{3}As^{3+}O_{13}(OH))
72. Graftonite 8.AB.20
  1. Graftonite (Y: 1900) 8.AB.20
    (IUPAC: iron(II) diiron(II) diphosphate)
  2. Graftonite-(Ca) (IMA2017-048) 8.AB.20 [no] [no]
    (IUPAC: calcium diiron(II) diphosphate)
  3. Graftonite-(Mn) (IMA2017-050) 8.AB.20 [no] [no]
    (IUPAC: manganese diiron(II) diphosphate)
73. Gramaccioliite-(Y) (crichtonite: IMA2001-034) 4.CC.40
74. Grammatikopoulosite (phosphide: IMA2019-090) 1.0 [no] [no]
  (IUPAC: nickel vanadium phosphide)
75. Grandaite (brackebuschite: IMA2013-059) 8.B?. [no]
  (IUPAC: distrontium aluminium hydro diarsenate)
76. Grandidierite (Y: 1902) 9.AJ.05
  (MgAl_{3}O_{2}(BO_{3})(SiO_{4}))
77. Grandreefite (IMA1988-016) 7.BD.45
  (IUPAC: dilead difluoro sulfate)
78. Grandviewite (IMA2007-004) 7.BB.60 [no]
  (Cu_{3}Al_{9}(SO_{4})_{2}(OH)_{29})
79. Grantsite (hewettite: IMA1967 s.p., 1964) 4.HG.55
80. Graphite (Y: 1789) 1.CB.05a
81. Grațianite (berthierite: IMA2013-076) 2.0 [no] [no]
  (IUPAC: manganese dibismuth tetrasulfide)
82. Gratonite (Y: 1940) 2.JB.55
  (IUPAC: nonalead tetrarsenide pentadecasulfide)
83. Grattarolaite (IMA1995-037) 8.BE.10
  (IUPAC: triiron(III) trioxophosphate)
84. Graulichite (alunite, crandallite) 8.BL.13
  (IUPAC: REE triiron(III) hexahydro diarsenate)
  1. Graulichite-(Ce) (alunite, crandallite: IMA2002-001) 8.BL.13 [no]
  2. Graulichite-(La) (alunite, crandallite: IMA2020-093) 8.BL.13 [no] [no]
85. Gravegliaite (gravegliaite: IMA1990-020) 4.JE.05
  (IUPAC: manganese(II) sulfite trihydrate)
86. Grayite (rhabdophane: 1957) 8.CJ.45
  (IUPAC: thorium phosphate monohydrate)
87. Grechishchevite (IMA1988-027) 2.FC.15c
  (Hg_{3}S_{2}BrCl_{0.5}I_{0.5})
88. Greenalite (serpentine: 1903) 9.ED.15
89. Greenlizardite (IMA2017-001) 7.E?. [no] [no]
  ((NH_{4})Na(UO_{2})_{2}(SO_{4})_{2}(OH)_{2}·4H_{2}O)
90. Greenockite (wurtzite: 1840) 2.CB.45
  (IUPAC: cadmium sulfide)
91. Greenwoodite (IMA2010-007) 9.A?. [no]
92. Gregoryite (IMA1981-045) 5.AA.10
  (IUPAC: disodium carbonate)
93. Greifensteinite (roscherite: IMA2001-044) 8.DA.10
  (Ca_{2}Be_{4}Fe^{2+}_{5}(PO_{4})_{6}(OH)_{4}·6H_{2}O)
94. Greigite (spinel, linnaeite: IMA1963-007) 2.DA.05
  (IUPAC: iron(II) diiron(III) tetrasulfide)
95. Grenmarite (seidozerite, rinkite: IMA2003-024) 9.BE.25 [no]
  (Na_{2}Zr_{2}Na_{2}MnZr(Si_{2}O_{7})_{2}O_{2}F_{2})
96. Grguricite (dresserite: IMA2019-123) 5.0 [no] [no]
  (IUPAC: calcium dichromium tetrahydro dicarbonate tetrahydrate)
97. Griceite (halite, rocksalt: IMA1986-043) 3.AA.20
  (IUPAC: lithium fluoride)
98. Griffinite (IMA2021-110) 4.CB. [no] [no]
99. Grigorievite (howardevansite: IMA2012-047) 8.0 [no]
  (IUPAC: tricopper diiron(III) dialuminium hexavanadate)
100. Grimaldiite ("O(OH)" group: IMA1967-036) 4.FE.20
  (IUPAC: hydrochromium oxide)
101. Grimmite (linnaeite: IMA2020-060) 2.0 [no] [no]
102. Grimselite (IMA1971-040) 5.ED.35
  (IUPAC: tripotassium sodium uranyl tricarbonate monohydrate)
103. Griphite (Y: 1891) 8.BF.15
104. Grischunite (wicksite: IMA1981-028) 8.CF.05
105. Groatite (alluaudite: IMA2008-054) 8.AC.10 [no]
  (☐NaCaMn_{2}(PO_{4})(HPO_{4})_{2})
106. Grokhovskyite (IMA2019-065) 2.0 [no] [no]
  (IUPAC: copper chromium disulfide)
107. Grootfonteinite (IMA2015-051) 5.0 [no] [no]
  (IUPAC: trilead oxodicarbonate)
108. Grossite (IMA1993-052) 4.CC.15
  (IUPAC: calcium tetraluminium heptaoxide)
109. Grossmanite (pyroxene: IMA2008-042a) 9.DA.15 [no]
110. Grossular (garnet, garnet: IMA1962 s.p., 1811) 9.AD.25
  (IUPAC: tricalcium dialuminium tri(tetraoxysilicate))
111. Groutite ("O(OH)" group: 1947) 4.FD.10
  (IUPAC: hydromanganese(III) oxide)
112. Grumantite (IMA1985-029) 9.EH.10
  (NaSi_{2}O_{4}(OH)·H_{2}O)
113. Grumiplucite (pavonite: IMA1997-021) 2.JA.05b
  (IUPAC: mercury dibismuth tetrasulfide)
114. Grundmannite (chalcostibite: IMA2015-038) 2.0 [no] [no]
  (IUPAC: copper bismuth diselenide)
115. Grunerite [Mg-Fe-Mn-amphibole: IMA2012 s.p., IMA1997 s.p., 1853] 9.DE.05
116. Gruzdevite (nowackiite: IMA1980-053) 2.GA.30
  (Cu_{6}Hg_{3}Sb_{4}S_{12})
117. Guanacoite (IMA2003-021) 8.DD.10 [no]
  (IUPAC: dicopper trimagnesium tetrahydro diarsenate tetrahydrate)
118. Guanajuatite (stibnite: 1858) 2.DB.05
  (IUPAC: dibismuth triselenide)
119. Guanine (IMA1973-056) 10.CA.30
120. Guarinoite (guarinoite: IMA1991-005) 7.DD.80
  (IUPAC: hexazinc decahydro sulfate pentahydrate)
121. Gudmundite (arsenopyrite: 1928) 2.EB.20
  (IUPAC: iron antimonide sulfide)
122. Guérinite (IMA2007 s.p., 1961) 8.CJ.75
  (IUPAC: pentacalcium di(hydroxoarsenate) diarsenate nonahydrate)
123. Guettardite (sartorite: IMA1966-018) 2.HC.05a
  (Pb_{8}(Sb_{0.56}As_{0.44})_{16}S_{32})
124. Gugiaite (melilite: IMA1983-072) 9.BB.10
  (IUPAC: dicalcium beryllium heptaoxy disilicate)
125. Guidottiite (serpentine: IMA2009-061) 9.ED.15 [no]
126. Guildite (Y: 1928) 7.DC.30
  (IUPAC: copper iron(III) hydro disulfate tetrahydrate)
127. Guilleminite (IMA1964-031) 4.JJ.10
  (IUPAC: barium triuranyl dioxodiselenite trihydrate)
128. Guimarãesite (roscherite: IMA2006-028) 8.DA.10 [no]
  (Ca_{2}Be_{4}Zn_{5}(PO_{4})_{6}(OH)_{4}·6H_{2}O)
129. Guite (spinel: IMA2017-080) 4.0 [no] [no]
  (IUPAC: cobalt(II) dicobalt(III) tetraoxide)
130. Gunningite (kieserite: IMA1962 s.p.) 7.CB.05
  (IUPAC: zinc sulfate monohydrate)
131. Günterblassite (günterblassite: IMA2011-032) 9.0 [no] [no]
132. Gunterite (decavanadate: IMA2011-001) 8.0 [no]
  (Na_{4}(H_{2}O)_{16}(H_{2}V_{10}O_{28})·6H_{2}O)
133. Gupeiite (silicide: IMA1983-087) 1.BB.30
  (IUPAC: triiron silicide)
134. Gurimite (palmierite: IMA2013-032) 8.0 [no] [no]
  (IUPAC: tribarium divanadate)
135. Gurzhiite (IMA2021-086)
136. Gustavite (lillianite: IMA1967-048) 2.JB.40a
  (IUPAC: silver lead hexasulfide tribismuthide)
137. Gutkovaite-Mn (labuntsovite: IMA2001-038) 9.CE.30h [no]
138. Guyanaite ("O(OH)" group: IMA1967-034) 4.FD.10
  (IUPAC: hydrochromium oxide)
139. Gwihabaite (IMA1994-011) 5.NA.15
  (IUPAC: ammonium nitrate)
140. Gypsum [gypsos (Theophrastus), gypsum (Agricola, G., 1546)] 7.CD.40
  (IUPAC: calcium sulfate dihydrate)
141. Gyrolite (gyrolite: 1851) 9.EE.30
142. Gysinite
  1. Gysinite-(La) (IMA2022-008)
  2. Gysinite-(Nd) (ancylite: IMA1981-046) 5.DC.05
    (IUPAC: lead neodymium hydro dicarbonate monohydrate)
