= Gcwihaba =

Cave in the Okavango delta region of Botswana

Coordinates: 20°01.456′S 021°21.258′E

Gcwihaba is a cave in Botswana located in Okavango Delta region. The Gcwihaba Caves were part of the Kalahari landscape around two million years ago, at least for the entire period of the Pleistocene. The name of the cave is derived from San word and stands for "hyena's lair". The cave is situated 10 km away from the Namibian border. It was first shown to a European, Ghanzi region farmer Martinus Drotsky, in 1932, and the main cavern was named Drotsky's cavern after him.

Gwchihaba is a Botswana National Monument under the Monuments, Relics and Antiquities Act, and has been put forward to become a UNESCO World Heritage Site in 1999. It is the type locality of the mineral gwihabaite (IMA1994-011).

Even though nothing was found in the first 50 cm of cave during the excavations to affirm that the cave was settled as a camp, 51 stone artefacts (33 of them made from travertine) were released in the upper 50 cm of the cave. 50–80 cm of the cave is called The Terminal Pleistocene charcoal layer. More cultural relics were observed in this layer.

Research by a French team of researchers discovered fossils that existed for more than a million years but the evidence discovered by Dr Laurent Bruxelles and the team of French researchers could not conclusively conclude that Gcwihaba was the cradle of humankind.

Bones of African bullfrogs and pieces of ostrich eggshell were among the findings.

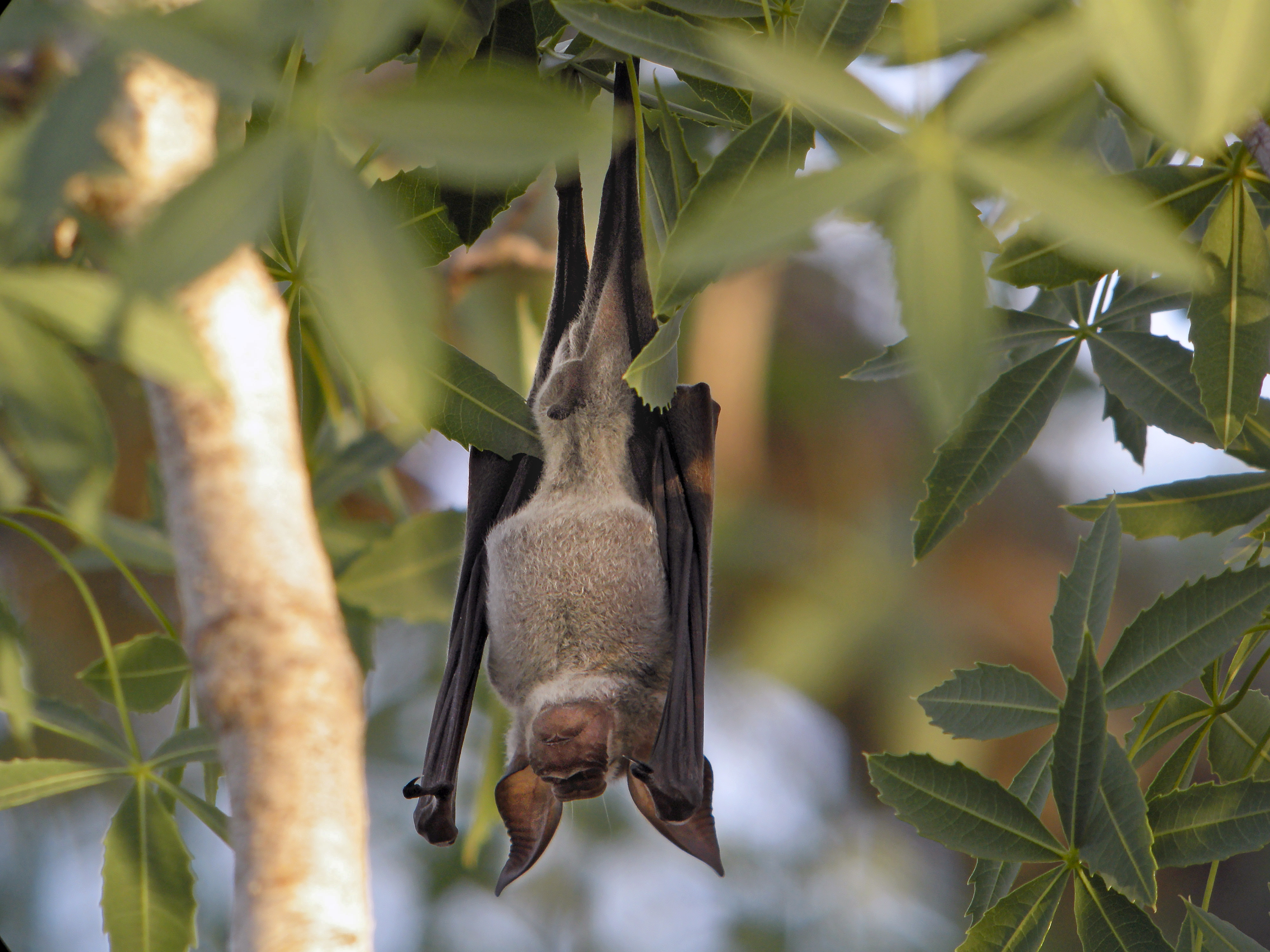
Commerson's Leaf-nosed bat that is common in gcwihaba

Due to the isolated nature of these caves, a special flora and fauna has developed. Some Aloe species and the Namaqua fig tree are only unique to these caves' surroundings. The roots of these fig trees are attracted to humid cave space and they have grown to create beautiful curtains inside the caves. The Namaqua fig tree in its turn is home of Rüppell's parrot which is also restricted to this area of Botswana. The area has quite a variety of bird species and also big mammals such as elephant, but perhaps scientifically more important biodeversity-wise is the invertebrate fauna surrounding as well as inside the caves. The caves are also home to large colonies of Commerson's leaf-nosed bats (which have a wingspan of up to 60 cm) and common slit-faced bats ( distinguished by their long ears).

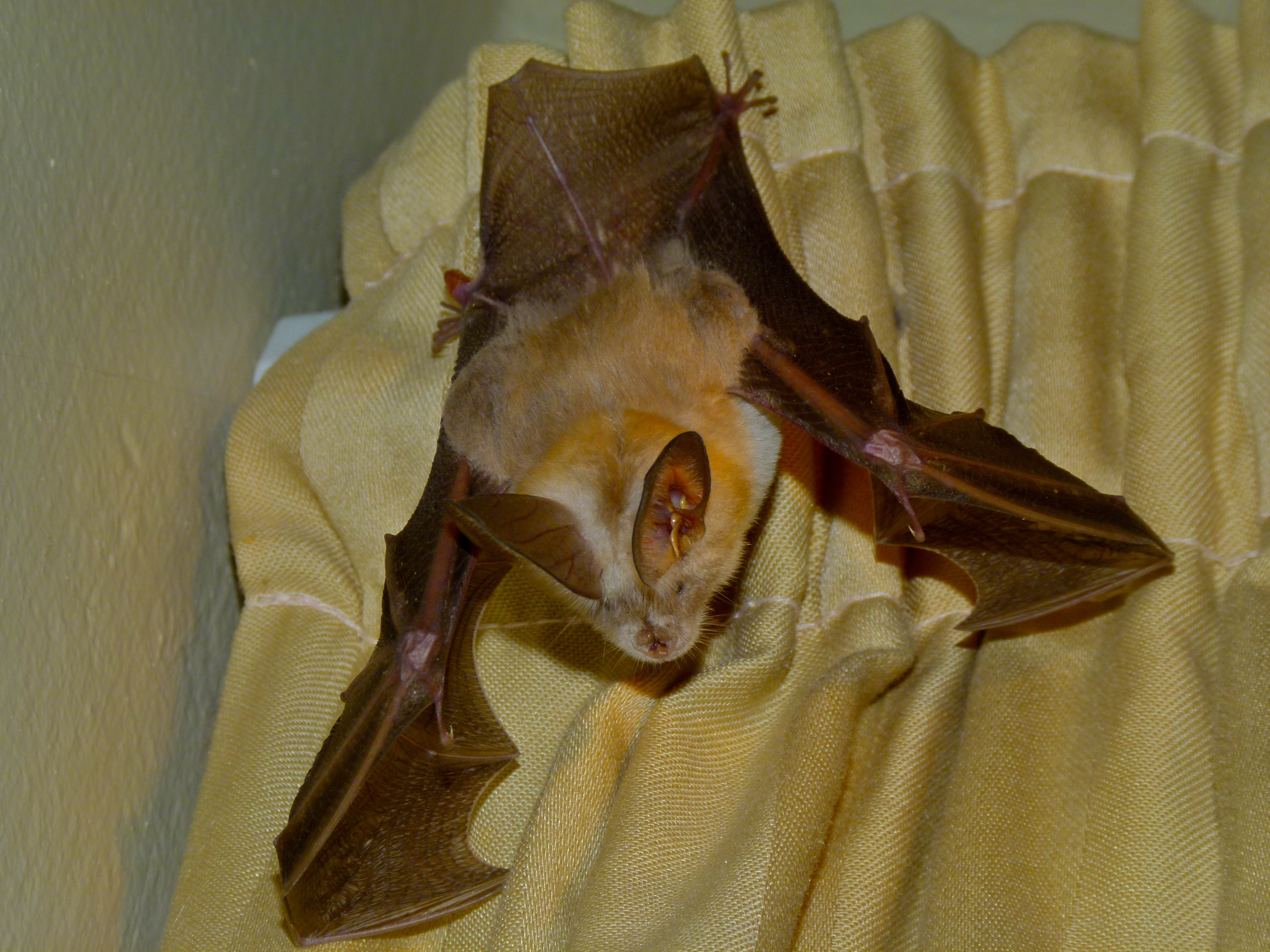
Common slit-faced Bat

This tourism site was officially opened by the former President of Botswana, Lt Gen. Dr. Seretse Khama Ian Khama, on 18 December 2014 and the facilities include the gatehouse, ablutions, boreholes, campsite and an airstrip.
