= SSZ-13 =

Framework structure of SSZ-13 with CHA topology

SSZ-13 (framework type code CHA) is a high-silica aluminosilicate zeolite possessing 0.38 × 0.38 nm micropores. It belongs to the ABC-6 family of zeolites as well as offretite, cancrinite, erionite and other related small-pore zeolites. The framework topology is the same as that of chabazite but SSZ-13 has a high silica composition with Si/Al > 5, which leads to low cation exchange capacity. The typical chemical formula of the unit cell can be described as Q_{x}Na_{y}Al_{2.4}Si_{33.6}O_{72}•zH_{2}O (1.4 < x <27)(0.7 < y < 4.3)(1 < z <7), where Q is N,N,N-1-trimethyladamantammonium. The material was patented by Chevron research Company in 1985, and could potentially be used as a solid catalyst for the methanol-to-olefins (MTO) process and the selective catalytic reduction (SCR) of NOx.

== Structure ==
SSZ-13 corresponds to an isomorphous replacement of an aluminum atom with a silicon atom in the natural mineral chabazite. Although chabazite exists as a twin crystal, SSZ-13 is exclusively monocrystalline. Generally, zeolites corresponding to isomorphous replacement of chabazite are collectively called CHA-type zeolites. Lattice constants vary depending on the Si/Al ratio and the metal species contained, but the symmetry of the crystal remains basically the same.

The CHA framework, which is represented by connecting Si or Al atoms, is shown in the figure on the right and consists of only 4-, 6-, and 8-membered rings, with no 5-membered rings as found in ZSM-5 and mordenite. It is also characterized by a double six-membered ring structure (D6R) consisting of two six-membered rings and six four-membered rings.

The pore size of the zeolite is 0.38 nm when the size of the oxygen atoms is estimated by the ionic radius (0.135 nm), classifying it as a small pore zeolite. It can adsorb small gas molecules, but large organic molecules cannot enter the pores.

Another known rhyolite isotypic replacement is SAPO-34, a silicoaluminophosphate.

== Synthesis ==
SSZ-13 can be synthesized using the following method. The material is prepared from the following batch composition:

10 Na_{2}O : 2.5 Al_{2}O_{3} : 100 SiO_{2} : 4400 H_{2}O : 20 TMAdOH.

2 g 1N NaOH, 2,78 g 0.72 M N,N,N-1-trimethyladamantammonium hydroxide (TMAdOH) and 3.22 g deionized water are mixed. 0,1 g Al_{2}O_{3} is added to the solution and mixed with 0.6 g fumed silica. The resulting viscous gel is aged for two hours and heated for 4 days at 160 °C in a Teflon lined steel autoclave. The crystallized product can be recovered by filtration.

Submicron-sized SSZ-13 can be prepared in 6 hours through a rapid steam-assisted crystallization method using tetraethyl orthosilicate (TEOS) as the silica source.

== Uses ==
SSZ-13 is a high-silica zeolite with the CHA topology. Materials with this topology are of industrial interest, as potential catalysts for application in the methanol to olefins (MTO) reaction.

Recently SSZ-13 has attracted attention as the catalyst for selective catalytic reduction (SCR) of NOx. Actually copper-loading SSZ-13 is industrially applied to the emission control of diesel engines.

== See also ==
- Chabazite
- Zeolite
