= Gmelinite =

Zeolite mineral series

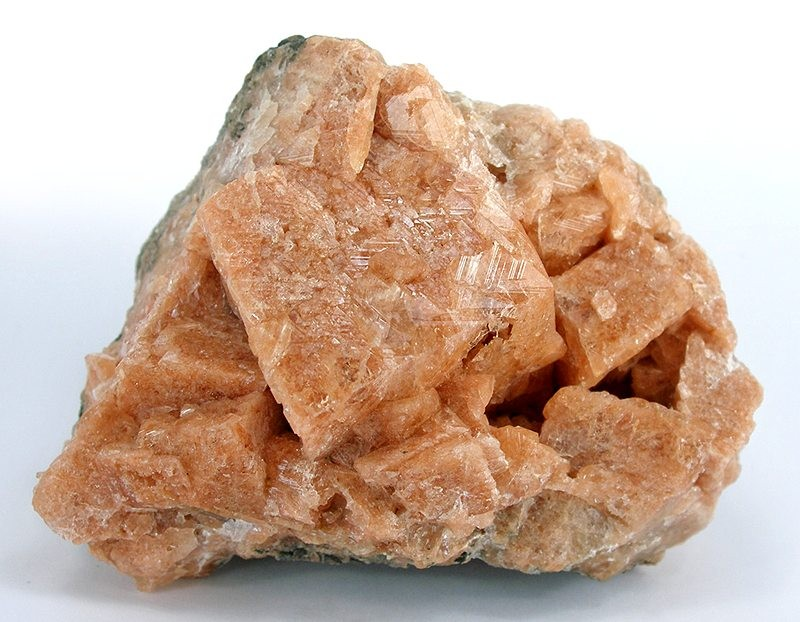

General
- Category: Tectosilicate minerals
- Group: Zeolite group
- Formula: Na_{4}(Si_{8}Al_{4})O_{24}·11H_{2}O
- IMA symbol: Gmelinite-Na: Gme-Na
- Strunz classification: 9.GD.05 (10 ed); 8/J.26-50 (8 ed)
- Dana classification: 77.1.2.6
- Crystal system: Hexagonal
- Crystal class: Dihexagonal dipyramidal (6mmm); H-M symbol: (6/m 2/m 2/m)
- Space group: P6_{3}/mmc
- Unit cell: a = 13.78, c = 10.03 [Å]; Z = 4

Identification
- Formula mass: 2,000.77 g
- Color: Colorless, white, yellow, orange, pale green, pink, red, brown and grey
- Crystal habit: Hexagonal plates, or short prisms, showing hexagonal dipyramids, pyramids and basal pinacoid. {101̅0}, {101̅1} and {0001} dominant. May also be tabular or rhombohedral. Crystals are striated parallel to (0001)
- Twinning: Interpenetrant twins common on {101̅1}. The twins consist of four individuals, three are at 90° to the other and at 60° to each other
- Cleavage: Good on {101̅0}
- Fracture: Conchoidal
- Tenacity: Brittle
- Mohs scale hardness: 4 1/2
- Luster: Dull to vitreous
- Streak: White
- Diaphaneity: Transparent, translucent or opaque
- Specific gravity: 2.04 to 2.17
- Optical properties: Uniaxial (-)
- Refractive index: n_{ω} = 1.476 - 1.494, n_{ε} = 1.474 - 1.480
- Birefringence: δ = 0.002 - 0.014
- Solubility: Soluble in cold 10% HCl.
- Other characteristics: Piezoelectric. Barely detectable radioactivity. As with all zeolites, water is released on heating, and almost all has been expelled by 400 °C.

Gmelinite is a series of rare zeolite minerals. The most common member is gmelinite-Na; others are gmelinite-Ca and gmelinite-K. It is closely related to the very similar mineral chabazite. Gmelinite was named as a single species in 1825 after Christian Gottlob Gmelin (1792–1860) professor of chemistry and mineralogist from Tübingen, Germany, and in 1997 it was raised to the status of a series.
Gmelinite-Na has been synthesised from Na-bearing aluminosilicate gels. The naturally occurring mineral forms striking crystals, shallow, six sided double pyramids, which can be colorless, white, pale yellow, greenish, orange, pink, and red. They have been compared to an angular flying saucer.

== Structure ==
The aluminosilicate framework is composed of tetrahedra linked to form parallel double six-membered rings stacked in two different positions (A and B) in the repeating arrangement AABBAABB. The framework has no Al-Si order. Within the structure there are cavities with a cross-section of up to 4 Å, and also wide channels parallel to the c axis with a diameter of 6.4 Å. Space group: P6_{3}/mmc. Unit cell parameters: a=13.72 Å, c=9.95 Å, Z=4.

== Environment ==
Generally occurs in Si-poor volcanic rocks, marine basalts and breccias, associated with other sodium zeolites such as analcime, Na(Si_{2}Al)O_{6}·H_{2}O, natrolite, Na_{2}(Si_{3}Al_{2})O_{10}·2H_{2}O, and chabazite-Na, Na_{2}Ca(Si_{8}Al_{4})O_{24}·12H_{2}O. It also occurs in Na-rich pegmatites in alkaline rocks, and as an alteration product in some nepheline syenite intrusions. No sedimentary gmelinite has been found. It is generally assumed that it forms at low temperatures, less than 100 °C. It is widespread as a hydrothermal alteration product of ussingite, Na_{2}AlSi_{3}O_{8}(OH), associated with gobbinsite, Na_{5}(Si_{11}Al_{5})O_{32}·11H_{2}O, gonnardite, (Na,Ca)_{2}(Si,Al)_{5}O_{10}·3H_{2}O, and chabazite-K.

== Notable localities ==
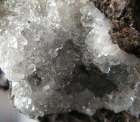
Gmelinite from Ireland

Gmelinite-Na occurs extremely rarely at the Francon Quarry, Montreal, Canada, in sills of the igneous volcanic rock phonolite which are rich in dawsonite, NaAl(CO_{3})(OH)_{2}. It occurs both as pure gmelinite-Na and interlayered with chabazite in water-quenched basalts in Western Tasmania.

Associated minerals include other zeolites, especially chabazite, quartz, aragonite and calcite.

== Distribution ==
Type Locality: Monte Nero, San Pietro, Montecchio Maggiore, Vicenza Province, Veneto, Italy. Also found in Australia, Canada, Czech Republic, Germany, Hungary, Japan, Russia, UK and US.
