= Greenwoodite =

Mineral in British Columbia, Canada

General
- Category: Nesosilicate
- Formula: Ba_{2-x}(V^{3+}OH)_{x}V_{9}(Fe^{3+}, Fe^{2+})_{2}Si_{2}O_{22}
- IMA symbol: Gwd
- Strunz classification: 9.AH.55
- Crystal system: Trigonal
- Crystal class: 3̅m (3̅/2m) - Hexagonal Scalenohedral (same H-M symbol)
- Space group: P3̅m1
- Unit cell: a = 5.750 Å, b = 5.750 Å c = 14.459 Å; α=90.00° β=90.00°, γ=120.00°

Identification
- Color: Black
- Crystal habit: Semi-Prismatic to Tabular Crystals
- Cleavage: Perfect on {001}
- Tenacity: Brittle
- Mohs scale hardness: 5
- Luster: Sub-Metallic, Dull
- Diaphaneity: Transparent
- Specific gravity: 4.81 (Calculated)
- Density: 4.81 g/cm^{3}

Greenwoodite is the second mineral discovered in the Wigwam deposit of southeastern British Columbia, Canada. It is compositionally and structurally distinct, but compositionally related to zoltaiite, the first new mineral described from this locality. The name is in honor of Hugh J. Greenwood, retired professor and former head of the Geological Sciences Department at the University of British Columbia, Vancouver, British Columbia, Canada. Grain size, polyhedral grain boundaries, and the general lack of secondary mineralization indicate that greenwoodite is part of a prograde metamorphic assemblage. The ideal chemical formula for greenwoodite is Ba_{2-x}(V^{3+}OH)_{x}V_{9}(Fe^{3+}, Fe^{2+})_{2}Si_{2}O_{22}.

== Occurrence ==
Greenwoodite is part of the prograde assemblage in a greenschist facies metamorphosed Mississippi-Valley type base-metal deposit. Greenwoodite is found as part of a suite of three minerals: greenwoodite, zoltaiite, and batisivite. All three minerals are found together in the Wigwam Deposit of British Columbia. All three of these minerals occur as trace phases within an assemblage of quartz, celsian, apatite, sphalerite, pyrrhotite, galena, and pyrite. Greenwoodite occurs as small, disseminated semi-prismatic to tabular grains. Irregular grains intergrown with other phases are common as well. Grains of greenwoodite can range from areas of 800 microns to 20,000 microns. The grains of greenwoodite can be found isolated, but are generally found in groups of 2-10 closely-spaced groups.

== Properties ==
=== Physical ===
Greenwoodite is a black and/or opaque mineral that has a sub-metallic/dull luster. On the Mohs Scale of Mineral Hardness, greenwoodite is a 5. Greenwoodite has one perfect plane of cleavage which is found on the {001} plane. The tenacity of Greenwoodite is brittle meaning it breaks or shatters very easily. The calculated density of greenwoodite is 4.81 g/cm^{3}.`

=== Optical ===
In reflected light, greenwoodite has a low reflectance (similar to that of sphalerite), gray color with a weak brownish tint, no internal reflections, and distinct bireflectance, pleochroism, and anisotropy with straight extinction relative to its cleavage direction.

=== Chemical ===
The empirical formula for greenwoodite is Ba_{0.60}(V^{3+}OH)_{0.40}(V^{3+}_{8.33}, Cr_{0.33}, Ti_{0.13}, Al_{0.13}, Mn^{3+}_{0.02})_{Σ9}(Fe^{3+}_{1.08}, Fe^{2+}_{0.60}, Zn_{0.22}, Al_{0.06}, Mg_{0.04})_{Σ2}(Si_{1.72}, Fe^{3+}_{0.28})_{Σ2}O_{22}

==== Composition ====
Oxide	wt%
MgO	0.12
Al_{2}O_{3}	0.91
SiO_{2}	8.63
TiO_{2}	1.05
V_{2}O_{3}	58.03
Cr_{2}O_{3}	1.42
MnO	0.11
FeO	[3.72]
Fe_{2}O_{3}	[9.1]
ZnO	1.52
BaO	15.13
H_{2}O	[0.62]
Total	100.36

== Structure ==
Greenwoodite is part of the Trigonal System with a Space Group of P3̅m1. The unit cell dimensions are a = 5.750 Å, b = 5.750 Å c = 14.459 Å; α=90.00° β=90.00°, γ=120.00°. The calculated X-Ray Powder pattern is 2.925 (100), 2.875 (38), 2.469 (35), 1.438 (35), 2.354 (28), 2.212 (28), 1.669 (26).

== See also ==
- List of minerals
