= Greenlizardite =

Rare sulfate mineral

General
- Category: Sulfate
- Formula: (NH)_{4}Na(UO_{2})_{2}(SO_{4})_{2}(OH)_{2}•4H_{2}O
- IMA symbol: Glz
- Crystal system: Triclinic
- Crystal class: 1̅
- Space group: P1̅
- Unit cell: a = 6.83617 Å, b = 9.5127 Å c = 13.8979 Å; α = 98.636°, β = 93.713°, γ = 110.102°; Z = 2

Identification
- Color: Light green-yellow
- Crystal habit: Bladed
- Cleavage: Perfect along {100} and good along {21̅0}
- Tenacity: Brittle
- Mohs scale hardness: ~2
- Luster: Vitreous
- Diaphaneity: Transparent
- Density: 3.469 g/cm^{3} (calculated)
- Optical properties: Biaxial positive
- Refractive index: n_{α}= 1.559 n_{β}= 1.582 n_{γ}= 1.608
- Birefringence: δ = 0.049
- Pleochroism: Weak
- Other characteristics: Radioactive

Greenlizardite is a rare sulfate mineral discovered underground in the Green Lizard Mine, which the mineral was named for, in Utah. The mineral was found in mineralized ore channels within the Shinarump member of the Chinle formation. It occurs as a secondary alteration phase. It is associated with ammoniozippeite, boussingaultite, and dickite. Greenlizardite was approved as a mineral by the International Mineralogical Association in 2017.

== Physical properties ==
Greenlizardite forms in a bladed habit, with blades up to 0.3 mm long. Its color is light green-yellow. It is highly soluble in water at room temperature. Its hardness is approximately two on the Mohs hardness scale and it has a white streak. Greenlizardite is brittle with irregular fracture. It has perfect cleavage in the [001] direction and good cleavage in the [21̅0] direction. It is transparent and has vitreous luster. The calculated density of the empirical formula of Greenlizardite is 3.469 g/cm^{3}.

== Optical properties ==
Greenlizardite is biaxial positive. Twinning is observed in cross polarized light and it displays weak pleochroism and moderate dispersion. Under a 50 mW 540 nm blue violet laser, it fluoresces greenish-blue. Refractive indices are α = 1.559, β = 1.582 and γ = 1.608.

== Composition ==
The calculated empirical formula of Greenlizardite is (NH_{4})_{0.98}Na_{1.00}U_{1.96}S_{2.04}O_{18.00}H_{10.0}. Its ideal formula is (NH_{4})Na(UO_{2})_{2}(SO_{4})_{2}(OH)_{2}·4H_{2}O.

== Crystal structure ==
A U^{6+} atom is surrounded by 7 O atoms in a pentagonal bipyramid shape. These UO_{7} pentagonal bipyramids are connected in pairs, sharing one common edge. The UO_{7} dimers share corners with SO_{4} groups, forming sheets with the composition [(UO_{2})_{2}(SO_{4})_{2}(OH)_{2}]^{2-} . These sheets are parallel to the (001) plane. The corner of each SO_{4} group not shared with the UO_{7} bipyramids within the same sheet points in the same direction. Each Na atom is bonded to two different uranyl O atoms in two separate adjacent sheets. Each Na atom is also bonded to two Sulfate O atoms from each of the two adjacent sheets, for a total of 6 O atoms coordinated around. These NaO_{6} octahedra are oriented along the (100) plane in zigzag shaped chains by sharing edges. These zigzag shaped chains link the two adjacent sheets together to form a slab. Within this slab structure, there are channels along the (100) plane that contain isolated H_{2}0 groups. The slabs are connected by a NH_{4} bonded to two uranyl O atoms from one adjacent slab and one equatorial O atom from a UO_{7} group in the other slab, as well as three H_{2}O groups.
