= Garronite-Ca =

Zeolite mineral

- Garronite-Ca. Group of crystals in oriented growth. Quarry of Barranc Salat, Calpe (Alicante) Spain. Group height 11 mm.

General
- Category: Tectosilicate minerals
- Group: Zeolite group
- Formula: Na_{2}Ca_{5}Al_{12}Si_{20}O_{64}·27H_{2}O
- IMA symbol: Grn-Ca
- Crystal system: Tetragonal
- Crystal class: 3̅2m

Identification
- Color: White
- Crystal habit: Typically rhombohedral crystals saddle-shaped, twisted
- Cleavage: ]
- Mohs scale hardness: 4-5
- Luster: Vitreous
- Streak: White
- Diaphaneity: Translucent
- Specific gravity: 2,2

Garronite-Ca is a fairly rare silicate mineral, from the zeolite, which has been found in a few dozen locations in the world. It was first found in the Glenariff Valley, Garron Plateau, County Antrim, Northern Ireland, and in some locations in Iceland. The name comes from the town of Garron, in Northern Ireland, which is consequently considered its type locality. The name initially used was that of Garronite, without subfixes, but the discovery in 2015 of a garronite with dominant sodium instead of calcium in the position of interchangeable cations made it necessary to use subfixes, remaining as Garronite-Ca, to distinguish it from the new species, Garronite-Na.

== Physical and chemical properties ==
Garronite-Ca is generally found as masses and nodules with a finely fibrous internal structure, white in color, usually showing a concentric growth structure. This causes the nodules to present with a conchoidal fracture. It is very rare as defined crystals. When crystals appear, they usually show the faces corresponding to {101} and {011}.

== Localities ==
Garronite-Ca is formed under hydrothermal conditions at low temperature. It is a rare zeolite, and very rare in the form of defined crystals. As fibrous masses, filling vacuoles in basalts, it has been found in the county of Antrim, in Northern Ireland (United Kingdom), and in the area of Fáskrúðsfjörður (Iceland). It is usually associated with phillipsite, which is located in the outer area of the nodules. As crystals, associated with calcite and analcime, it has been found in San Giorgio di Perlena, Fara Vicentino, Vicenza (Italy) and in Barranc Salat, Calpe, Alicante (Spain).
