= Grootfonteinite =

Lead carbonate mineral

General
- Category: Carbonate
- Formula: Pb_{3}O(CO_{3})_{2}
- IMA symbol: Gtf
- Crystal system: Hexagonal
- Crystal class: Dihexagonal pyramidal (6mm) (same H-M symbol)
- Space group: P6_{3}mc
- Unit cell: a = 5.30, b = 13.77 [Å] (approximated)

Identification

Grootfonteinite is a rare lead carbonate mineral with the relatively simple formula Pb_{3}O(CO_{3})_{2}. It is one of a number of minerals discovered at the Kombat mine, Grootfontein district, Namibia.

== Relation to other minerals ==
Grootfonteinite is structurally related to hydrocerussite and plumbonacrite.
