= Chabazite =

Series of zeolite minerals

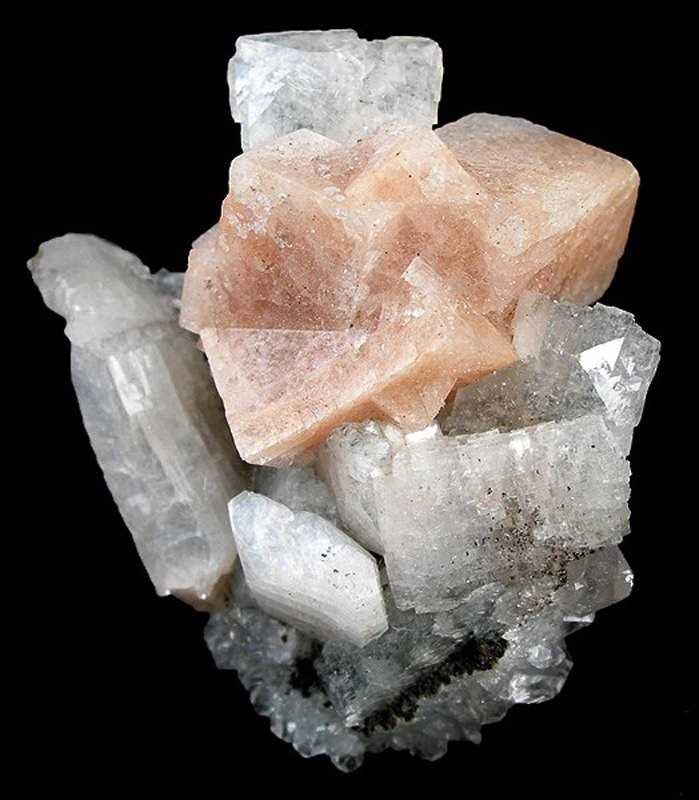
- Salmon-pink chabazite on white heulandite

General
- Category: Tectosilicate minerals
- Group: Zeolite group, chabazite-lévyne subgroup
- Formula: M[Al_{2}Si_{4}O_{12}]·6H_{2}O
- IMA symbol: Cbz
- Strunz classification: 9.GD.10
- Crystal system: Trigonal
- Crystal class: Hexagonal scalenohedral 3̅m H-M symbol: (3̅ 2/m)
- Space group: R3̅m

Identification
- Color: Colorless, white, yellow, pink, red
- Cleavage: distinct/good on {1011}
- Fracture: irregular/uneven
- Mohs scale hardness: 4-5
- Luster: vitreous
- Streak: white
- Diaphaneity: transparent, translucent
- Specific gravity: 2.05 - 2.2

Chabazite (UK: /ˈkæbəzaɪt/) is a tectosilicate mineral series in the zeolite group, closely related to gmelinite, with the chemical formula M[Al_{2}Si_{4}O_{12}]·6H_{2}O, where M is one or more metal cations. Recognized minerals in the series include Chabazite-Ca, Chabazite-K, Chabazite-Na, and Chabazite-Sr, depending on the prominence of the indicated cation.

Chabazite crystallizes in the triclinic crystal system with typically rhombohedral shaped crystals that are pseudo-cubic. The crystals are typically twinned, and both contact twinning and penetration twinning may be observed. They may be colorless, white, orange, brown, pink, green, or yellow. The hardness ranges from 3 to 5 and the specific gravity from 2.0 to 2.2. The luster is vitreous.

It was named chabasie in 1792 by Bosc d'Antic and later changed to the current spelling.

Chabazite occurs most commonly in voids and amygdules in basaltic rocks.

Chabazite is found in India, Iceland, the Faroe Islands, the Giants Causeway in Northern Ireland, Bohemia, Italy, Germany, along the Bay of Fundy in Nova Scotia, Oregon, Arizona, and New Jersey.

== Synthetic chabazite ==
Many different materials that are isostructural with the chabazite mineral have been synthesized in laboratories. SSZ-13 is a CHA type zeolite with an Si/Al ratio of 14. This is a composition not found in nature.
