= Geikielite =

Magnesium titanium oxide mineral

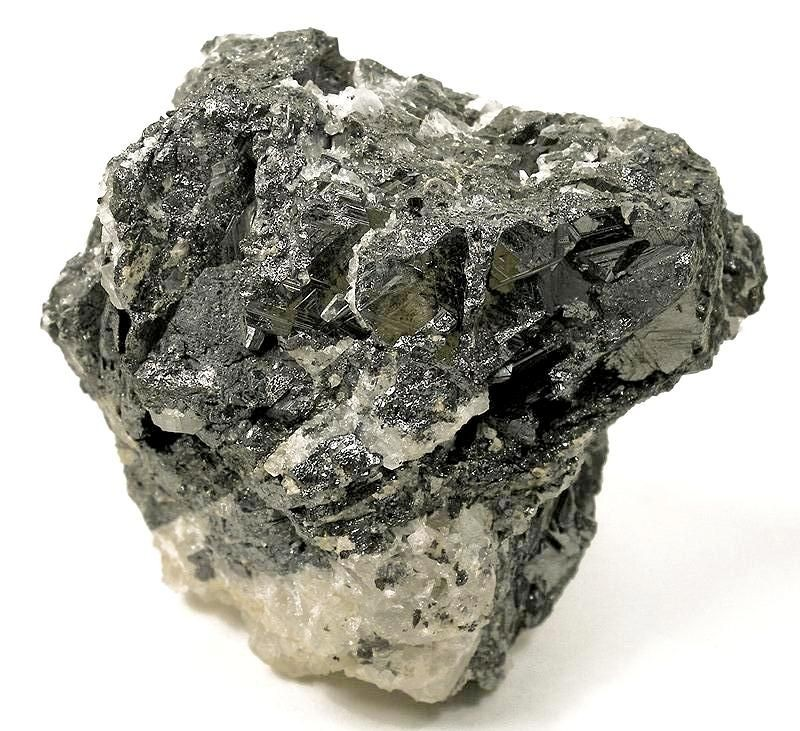
- Crystals of geikielite from the Maxwell quarry, Chelsea, Outaouais, Québec, Canada

General
- Category: Oxide mineral
- Formula: MgTiO_{3}
- IMA symbol: Gk
- Strunz classification: 4.CB.05
- Crystal system: Trigonal
- Crystal class: Rhombohedral (3̅) (same H-M symbol)
- Space group: R3̅
- Unit cell: a = 5.05478(26) Å c = 13.8992(7) Å; Z = 6

Identification
- Color: Black, ruby red uncommon; red internal reflections
- Crystal habit: Tabular prismatic crystals, also as finely granular masses
- Cleavage: Good on {101̅1}
- Mohs scale hardness: 5 - 6
- Luster: Sub-metallic
- Streak: Purplish brown
- Diaphaneity: Opaque to translucent
- Specific gravity: 3.79 - 4.2
- Optical properties: Uniaxial (-)
- Refractive index: n_{ω} = 2.310 - 2.350 n_{ε} = 1.950 - 1.980
- Birefringence: δ = 0.360 - 0.370
- Pleochroism: Weak, O = pinkish red, E = brownish to purplish red

Geikielite is a magnesium titanium oxide mineral with formula: MgTiO_{3}. It is a member of the ilmenite group. It crystallizes in the trigonal system forming typically opaque, black to reddish black crystals.

It was first described in 1892 for an occurrence in the Ceylonese gem bearing gravel placers. It was named for Scottish geologist Sir Archibald Geikie (1835–1924). It occurs in metamorphosed impure magnesian limestones, in serpentinite derived from ultramafic rocks, in kimberlites and carbonatites. Associated minerals include rutile, spinel, clinohumite, perovskite, diopside, serpentine, forsterite, brucite, hydrotalcite, chlorite and calcite.
