= Grandidierite =

Rare mineral

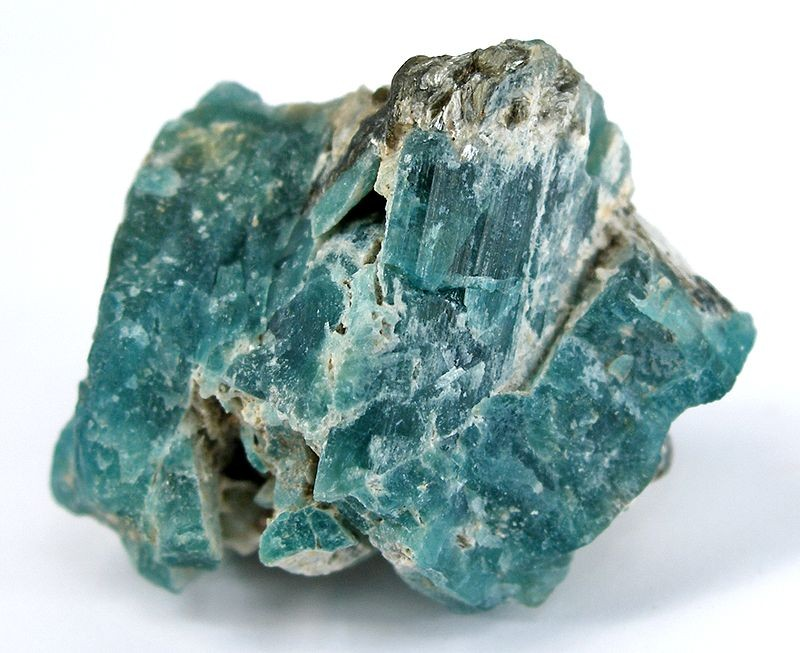
- Tabular crystals of grandidierite from the type locality in Madagascar

General
- Category: Nesosilicate
- Formula: (Mg,Fe^{2+})Al_{3}(BO_{3})(SiO_{4})O_{2}
- IMA symbol: Gdd
- Strunz classification: 9.AJ.05
- Dana classification: 54.01.01.01
- Crystal system: Orthorhombic
- Crystal class: Dipyramidal; H-M symbol: (2/m 2/m 2/m)
- Space group: Pbnm

Identification
- Color: Cyan to turquoise; bluish green
- Crystal habit: Tabular
- Twinning: none
- Cleavage: Good
- Fracture: Brittle
- Mohs scale hardness: 7.5
- Luster: Vitreous, glassy
- Streak: White
- Diaphaneity: Transparent to translucent
- Specific gravity: 2.85 to 3.00
- Density: 2.976
- Optical properties: Biaxial (-)
- Refractive index: 1.583 – 1.639
- Pleochroism: Visible
- 2V angle: Measured: 24° to 32°, calculated: 32°
- Dispersion: strong r < v

Grandidierite is a rare mineral that was first discovered in 1902 in southern Madagascar. The mineral was named in honor of French explorer Alfred Grandidier (1836–1912) who studied the natural history of Madagascar.

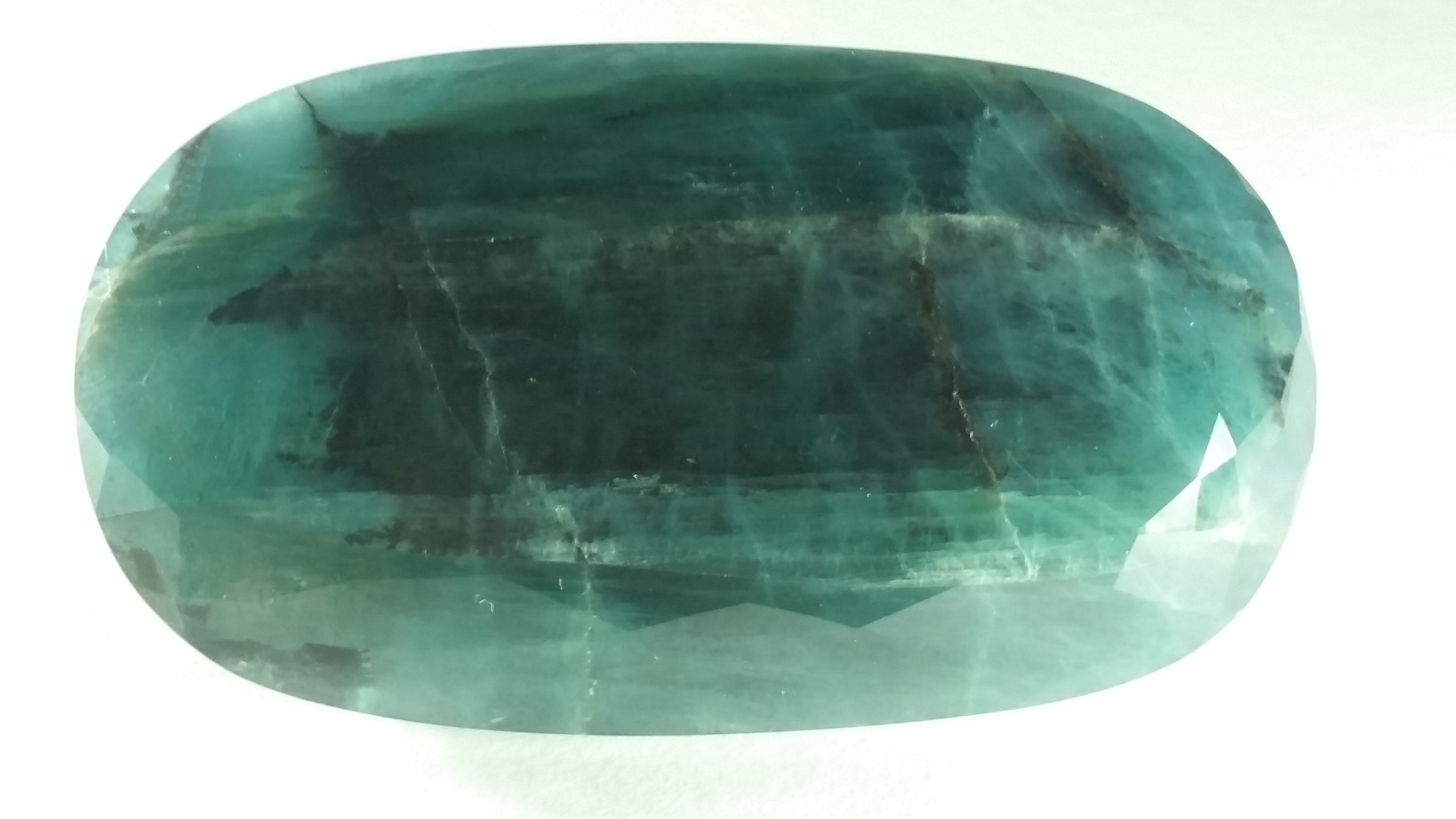
A large, faceted grandidierite, a 429.87 carat stone owned by a Filipino collector Benedicto G. Membrere V. GIL Report certificate number STN201811139168.

Grandidierites appear bluer in color the more iron (Fe) they contain. A recently discovered gemstone, blue ominelite, is the Fe-analogue (Fe, Mg) to grandidierite (Mg, Fe).

Grandidierites display strong trichroic pleochroism. That means that it can show three different colors depending on the viewing angle: dark blue-green, colorless (sometimes a very light yellow), or dark green.

While trichroism can usually help distinguish grandidierites from other gems, lazulites can occur with blue-green colors and show colorless/blue/dark blue pleochroism. Nevertheless, lazulites have somewhat higher refractive indices and specific gravity. Grandidierites also have greater hardness, with a 7.5 on the Mohs scale.

Large transparent faceted grandidierite specimens are extremely rare. The largest cut specimen currently known to the GIA weighs in at 763.5 carats.

== See also ==
- List of minerals
