= Gurimite =

Barium vanadate mineral

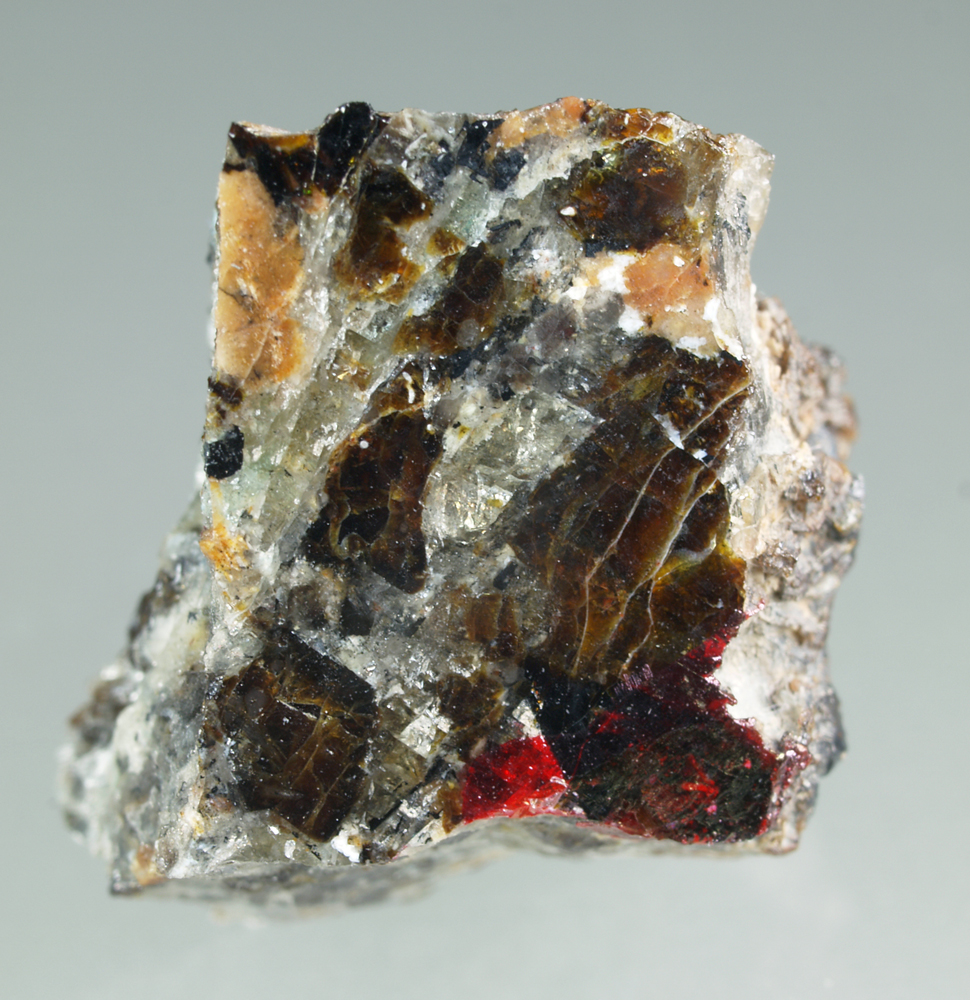
- Gurimite found in Israel

General
- Category: Vanadate mineral
- Formula: Ba_{3}(VO_{4})_{2}
- IMA symbol: Gur
- Crystal system: Trigonal
- Crystal class: Hexagonal scalenohedral (3̅m); H-M symbol: (3̅ 2m)
- Space group: R3̅m
- Unit cell: a = 5.78, c = 21.13 [Å] (approximated); Z = 3

Identification

Gurimite is a rare mineral with formula Ba_{3}(VO_{4})_{2}. It is a simple barium vanadate, one of the most simple barium minerals known. It is named after its type locality - Gurim anticline in Israel. It has formed in the rocks of the Hatrurim Formation. Gurimite's stoichiometry is similar to that of copper vanadates mcbirneyite and pseudolyonsite. An example of other barium vanadate mineral is tokyoite.
