= Gwihabaite =

General
- Category: Minerals
- Formula: (NH_{4},K)NO_{3}
- IMA symbol: Gwi
- Strunz classification: 5.NA.15
- Dana classification: 18.01.03.01
- Crystal system: Orthorhombic
- Crystal class: Dipyramidal
- Space group: Pmna (No. 62)
- Unit cell: a=7.075Å, b=7.647Å, c=5.779Å, Z=4

Identification
- Formula mass: 85.31
- Colour: White, colourless
- Crystal habit: Acicular, Efflorescences
- Cleavage: None
- Mohs scale hardness: 5
- Luster: Vitreous
- Streak: White
- Diaphaneity: Transparent
- Density: 1.77
- Birefringence: 0.141
- 2V angle: 87◦
- Dispersion: None
- Solubility: Soluble in H_{2}O , deliquescent

Gwihabaite is a rare ammonium potassium nitrate mineral (NH_{4},K)(NO_{3}). It is orthorhombic in form, colorless with a vitreous luster. It has a Mohs hardness of 5 and a specific gravity of 1.77. It is deliquescent and water-soluble. The mineral is also known as nitrammite. It was first described in 1996 for an occurrence in Gcwihaba Caves (Drotsky's Cavern, type locality), Maun, North-West District, Botswana. The spelling of the name was simplified, omitting the "c", which represents the "click" sound used by the San people. It occurs as incrustations and efflorescences on cave surfaces formed by bacterial action on bat guano.
