= List of minerals recognized by the International Mineralogical Association (S) =

This list includes those recognised minerals beginning with the letter S. The International Mineralogical Association is the international group that recognises new minerals and new mineral names; however, minerals discovered before 1959 did not go through the official naming procedure, although some minerals published previously have been either confirmed or discredited since that date. This list contains a mixture of mineral names that have been approved since 1959 and those mineral names believed to still refer to valid mineral species (these are called "grandfathered" species).

The list is divided into groups:

- Introduction • (Main synonyms)
- A • B • C • D • E • F • G • H • I • J • K • L • M • N • O • P–Q • R • S • T • U–V • W–X • Y–Z

The data was exported from mindat.org on 29 April 2005; updated up to 'IMA2021'.

The minerals are sorted by name, followed by the structural group (rruff.info/ima and ima-cnmnc by mineralienatlas.de, mainly) or chemical class (mindat.org and basics), the year of publication (if it's before of an IMA approval procedure), the IMA approval and the Strunz-mindat code. The first link is to mindat.org, the second link is to webmineral.com, and the third is to the Handbook of Mineralogy (Mineralogical Society of America).

- Abbreviations:
  - ^{D} – discredited (IMA/CNMNC status).
  - ^{Q} – questionable/ doubtful (IMA/CNMNC, mindat.org or mineralienatlas.de status).
  - ^{N} – published without approval of the IMA/CNMNC, or just not an IMA approved mineral but with some acceptance in the scientific community nowadays.
  - ^{I} – intermediate member of a solid-solution series.
  - ^{H} – hypothetical mineral (synthetic, anthropogenic, suspended approval procedure, etc.)
    - ^{ch} – incomplete description, hypothetical solid solution end member.
  - Rd – redefinition of ...
  - "s.p." – special procedure.
  - group – a name used to designate a group of species, sometimes only a mineral group name.
  - no – no link available.
  - IUPAC – chemical name.
  - Y: NNNN – year of publication.
  - Y: old – known before publications were available.

== S ==
=== Sa ===
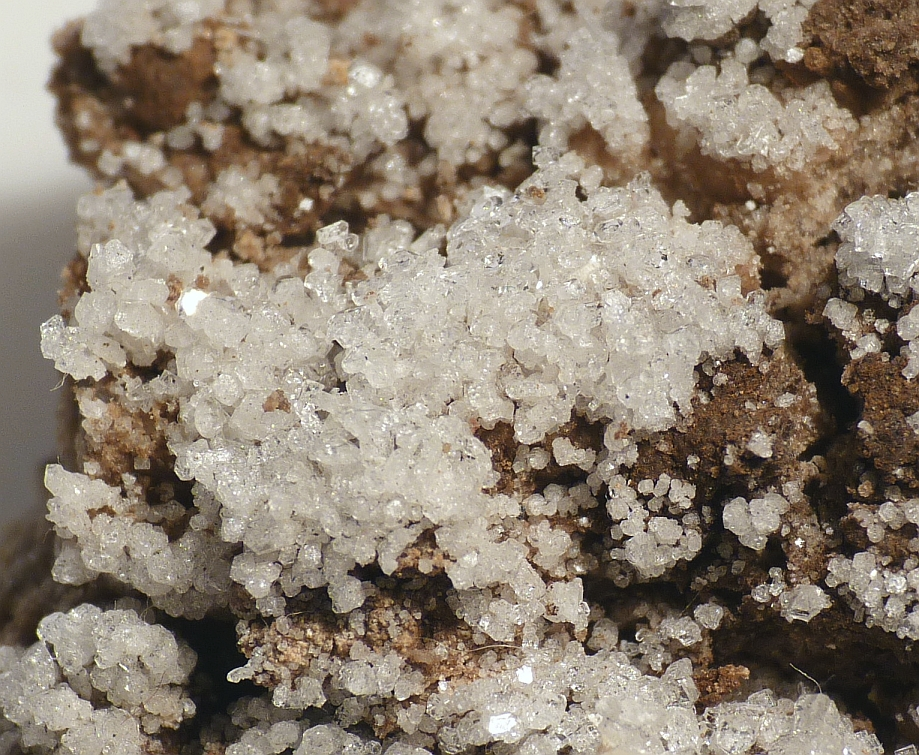
Salammoniac crystals from Belgium.

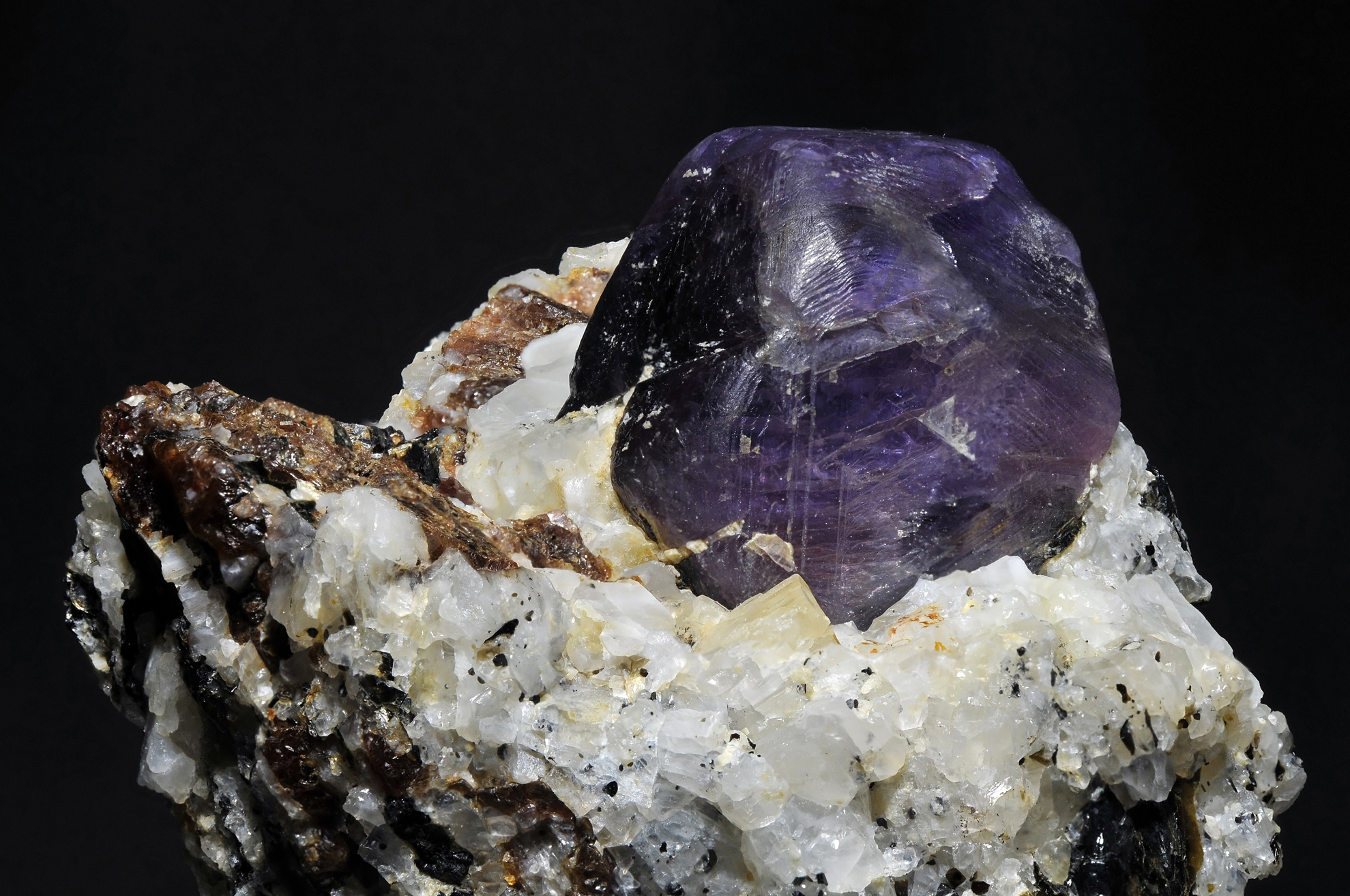
Crystal of corundum (var. sapphire), Zazafotsy Quarry, Fianarantsoa Province, Madagascar

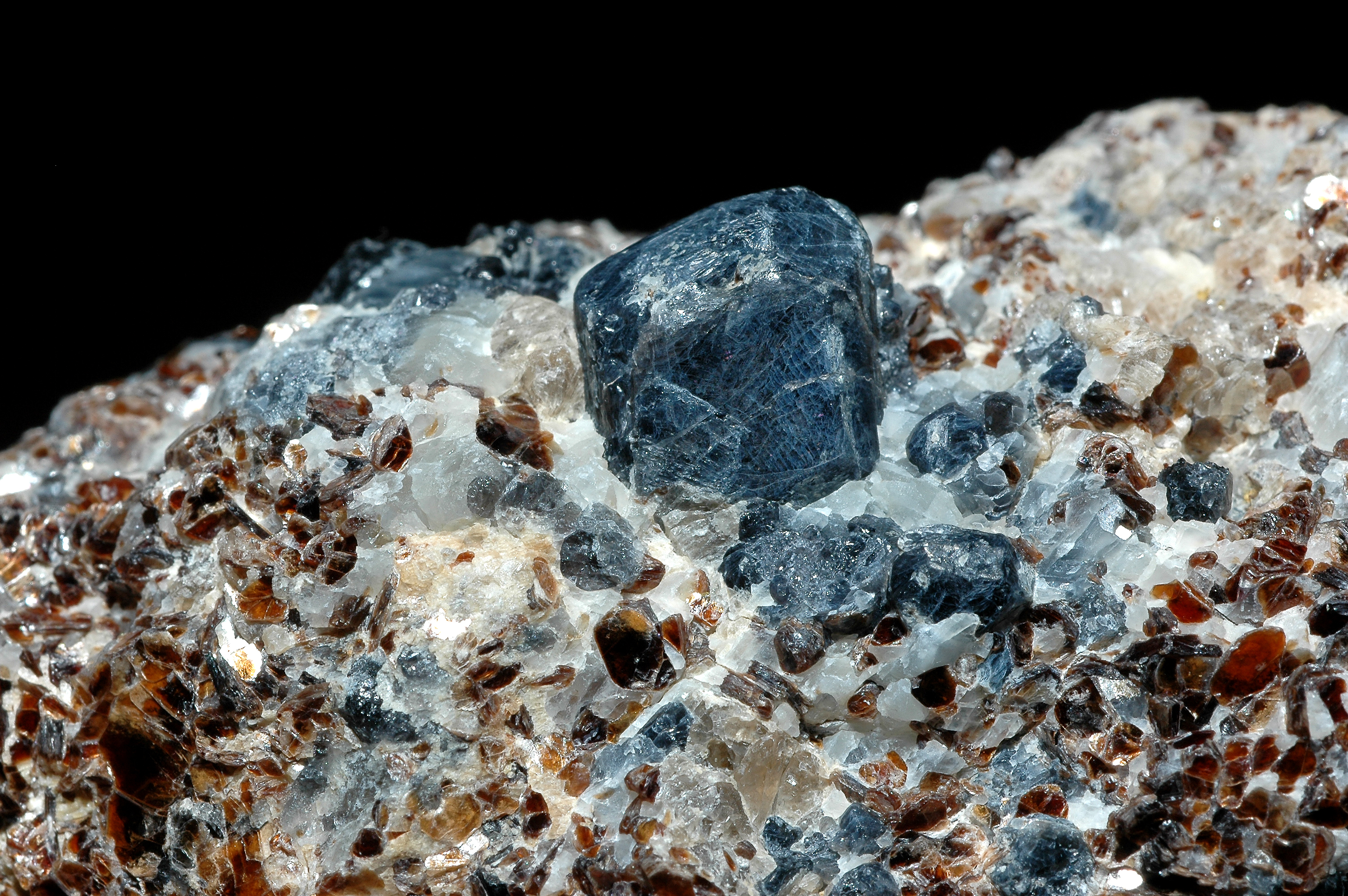
Sapphirine from Madagascar

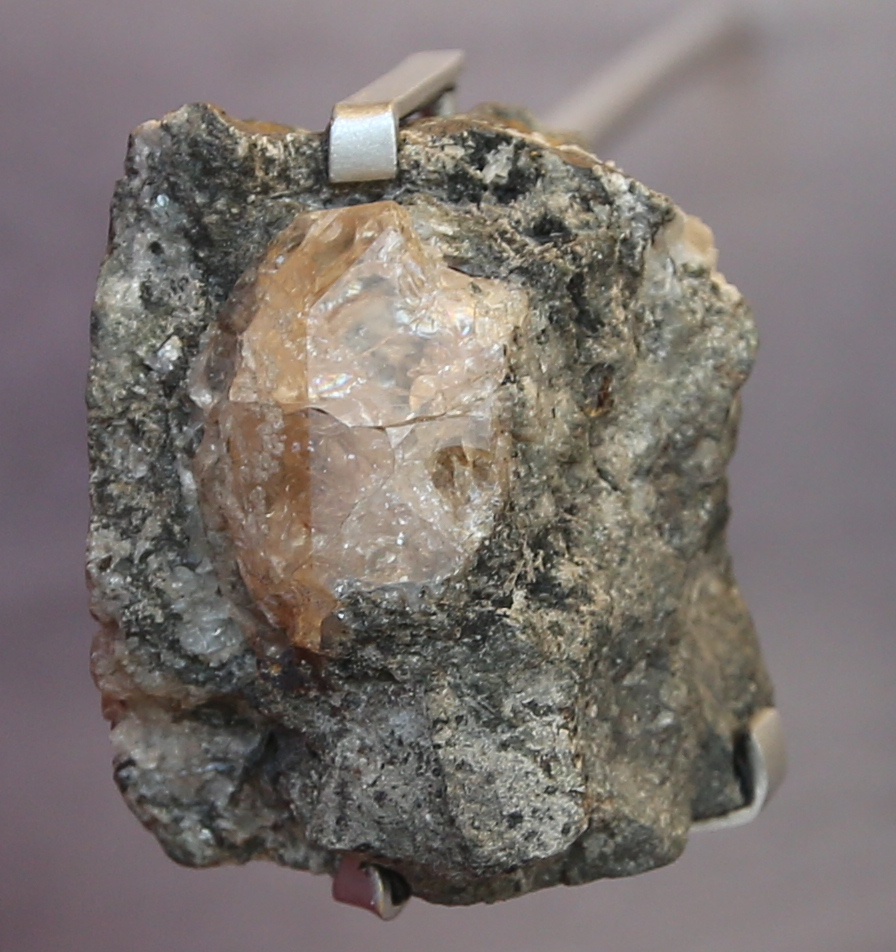
Sarcolite from Mount Vesuvius

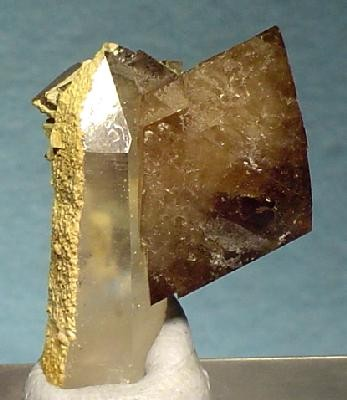
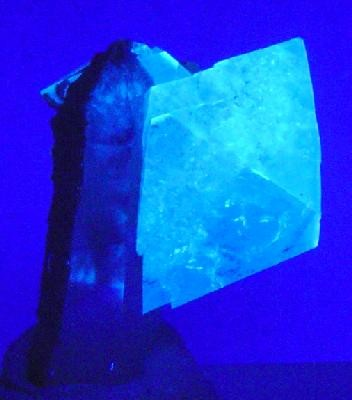
Scheelite, quartz. Tae Hwa Mine, Neungam-ri, Angseong-myeon, Chungju, Chungcheongbukdo, South Korea

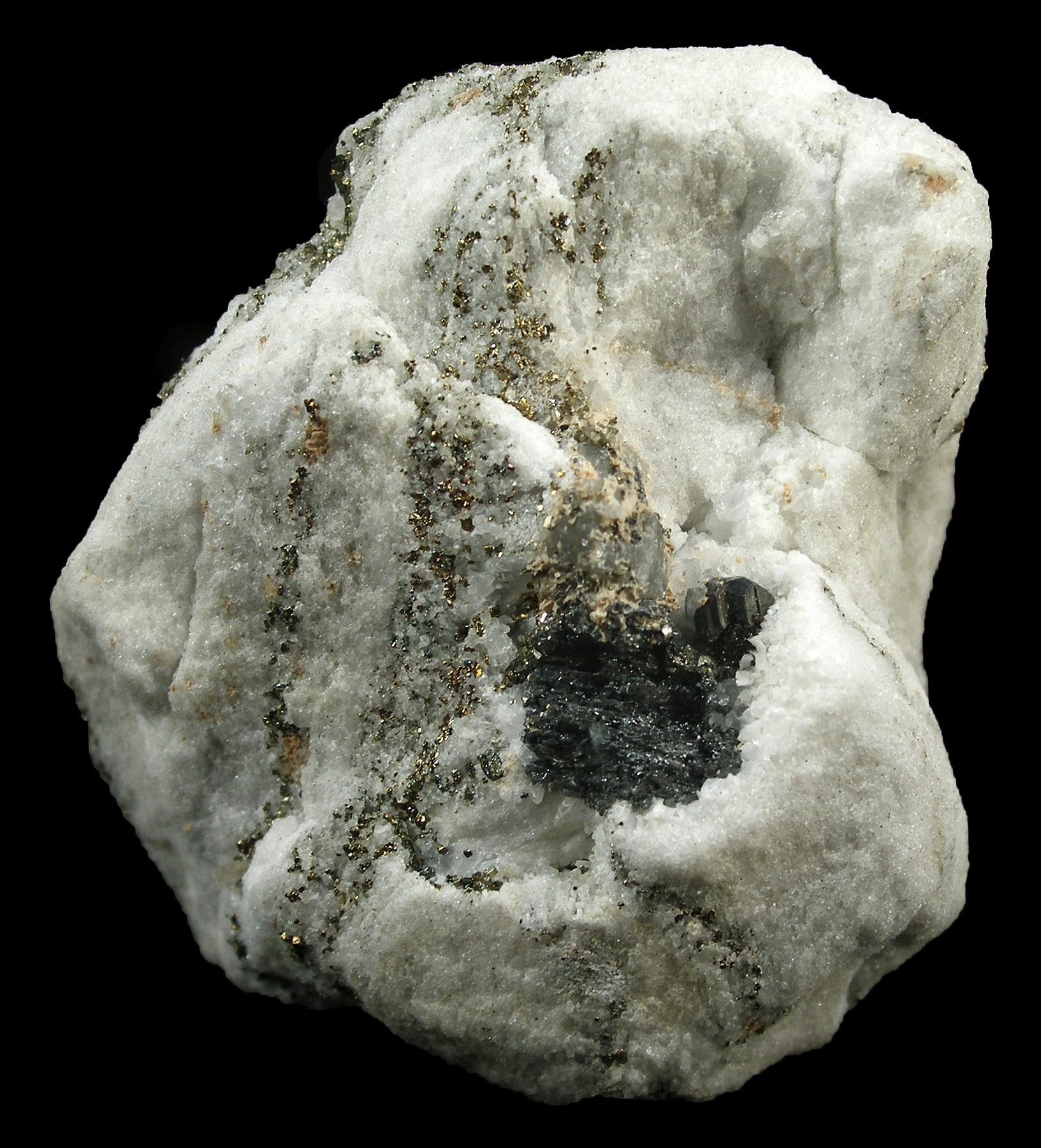
A protected cavity hosting a cluster of 2-3 mm striated sartorite crystals in dolomite matrix

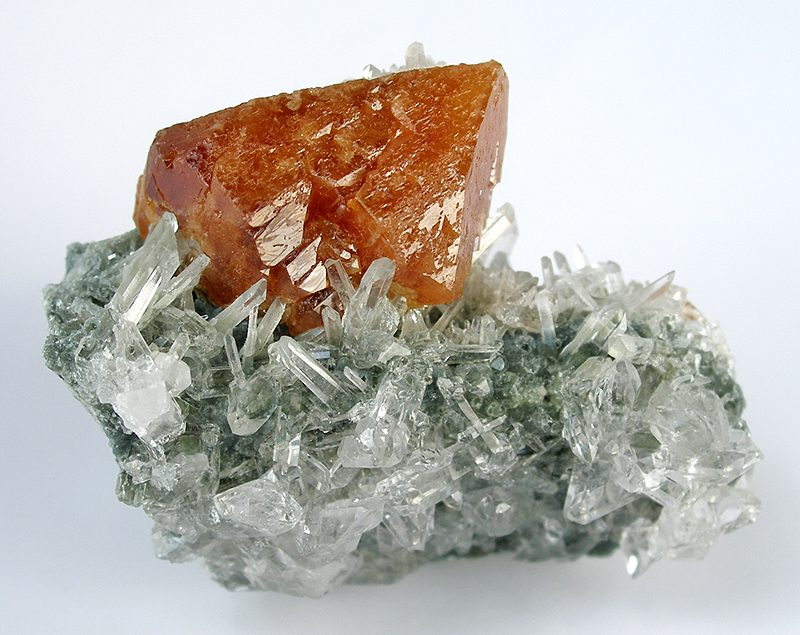
Scheelite crystals

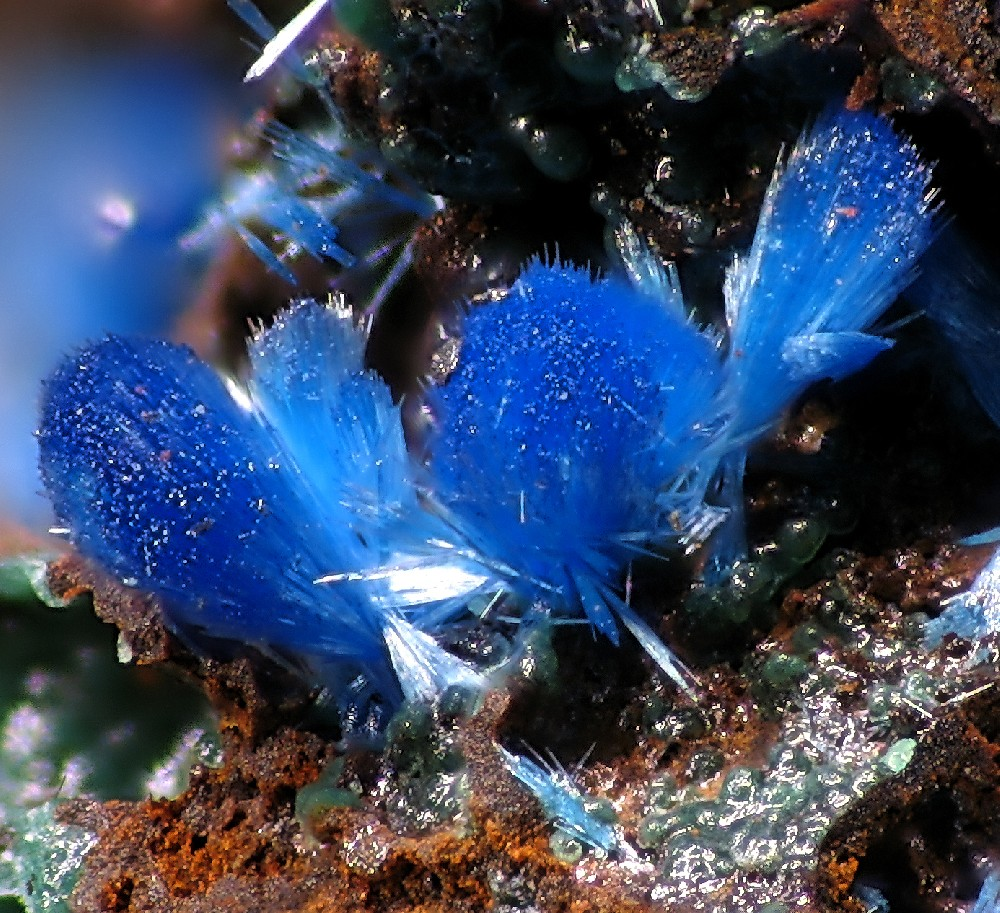
Schmiederite from El Dragón mine, Antonio Quijarro Province, Potosí Department, Bolivia

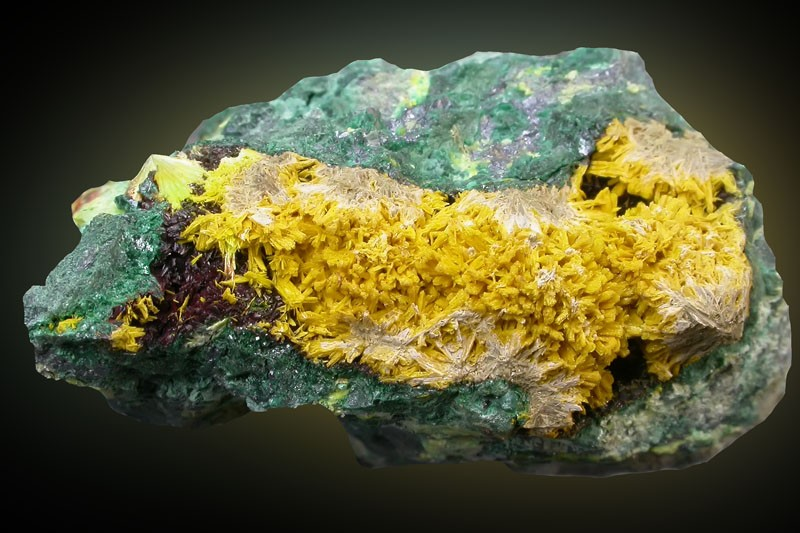
Schoepite from the Musonoi Mine, Kolwezi, Western area, Katanga Copper Crescent, Katanga (Shaba), Democratic Republic of Congo

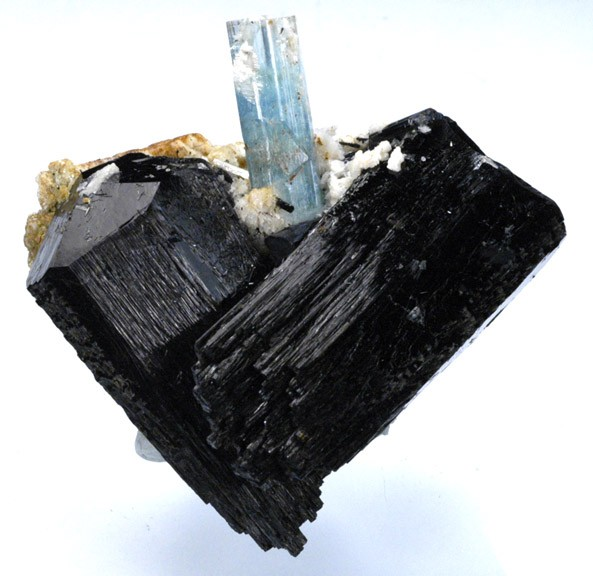
Beryl (var.: aquamarine), schorl. Erongo Region, Namibia

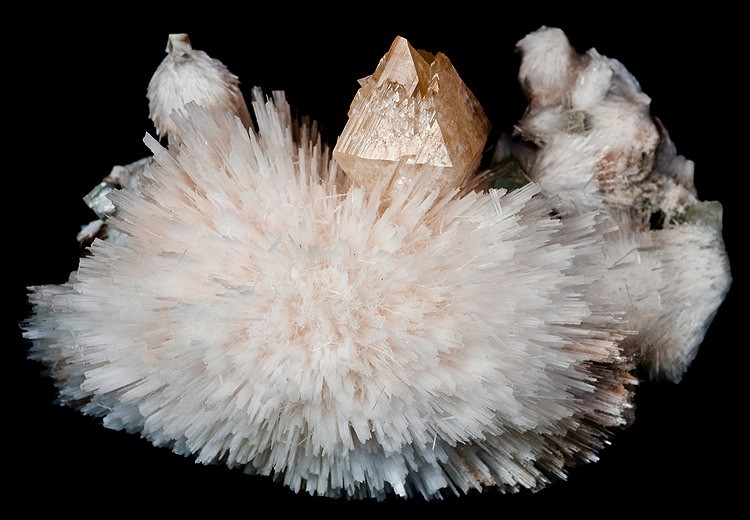
Cluster of scolecite blades, from Nasik District, Maharashtra, India

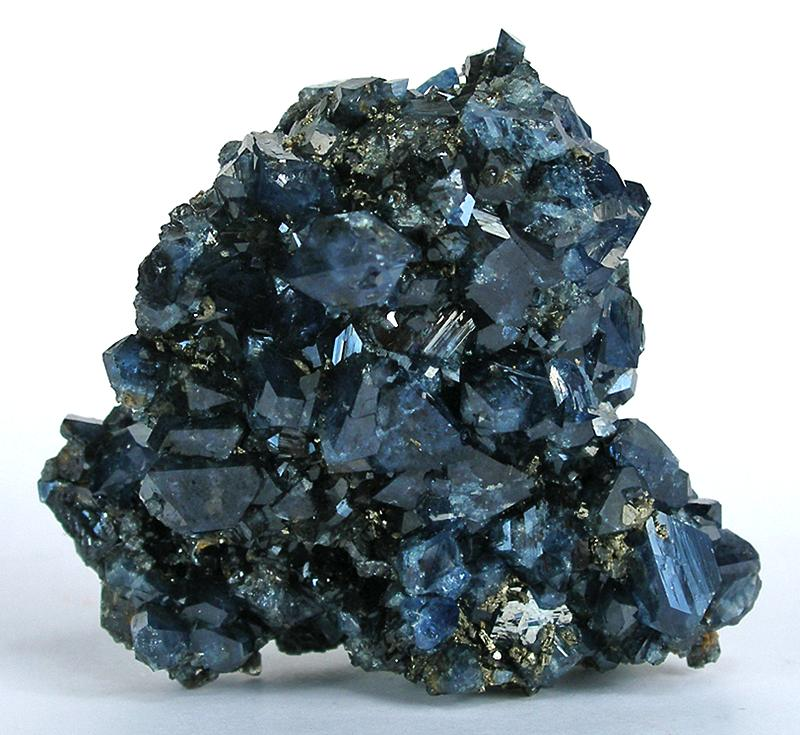
Vivid blue crystals of scorodite

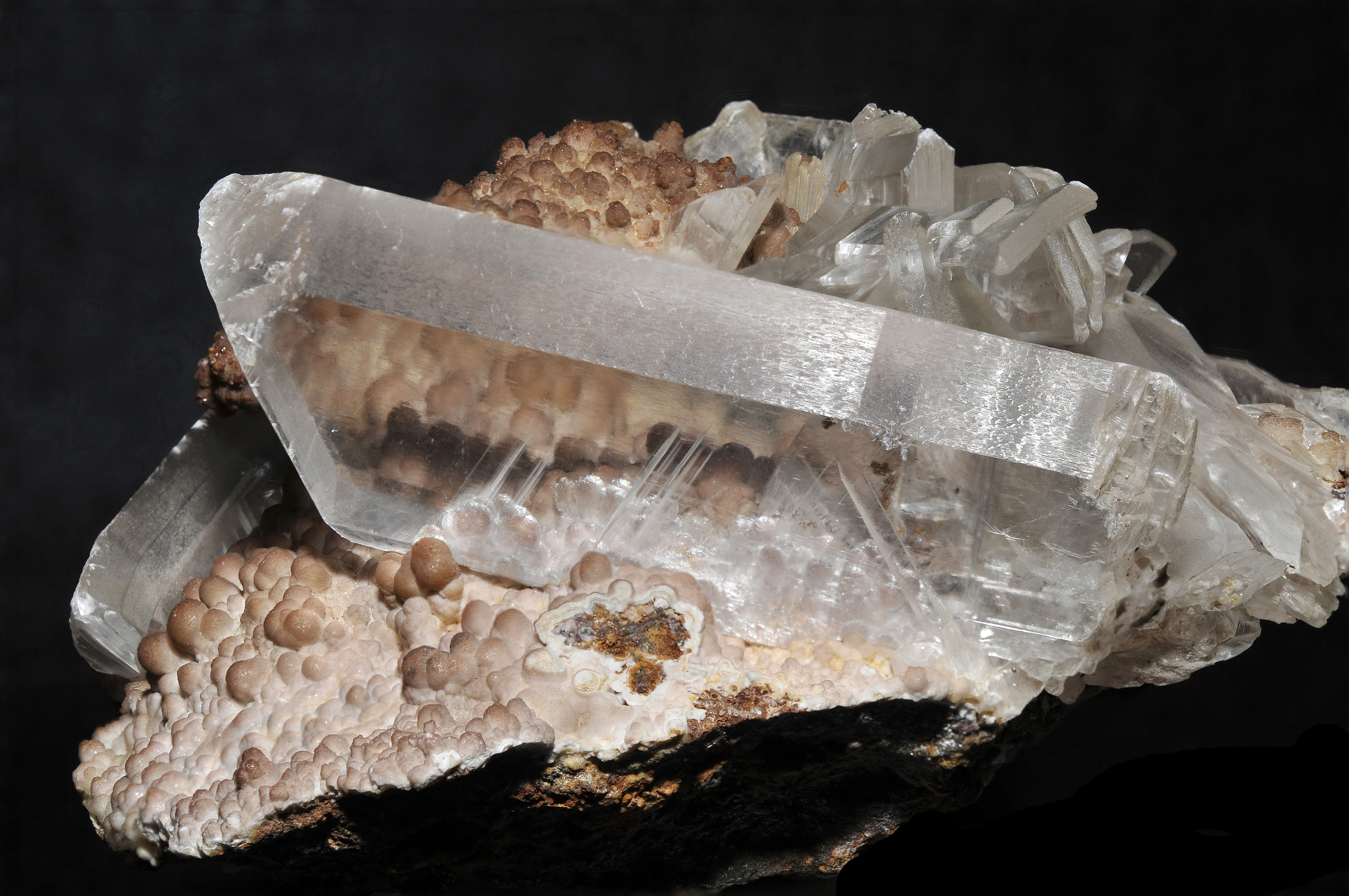
Gypsum (var. selenite), from Santa Eulalia District, Mun. de Aquiles Serdán, Chihuahua, Mexico

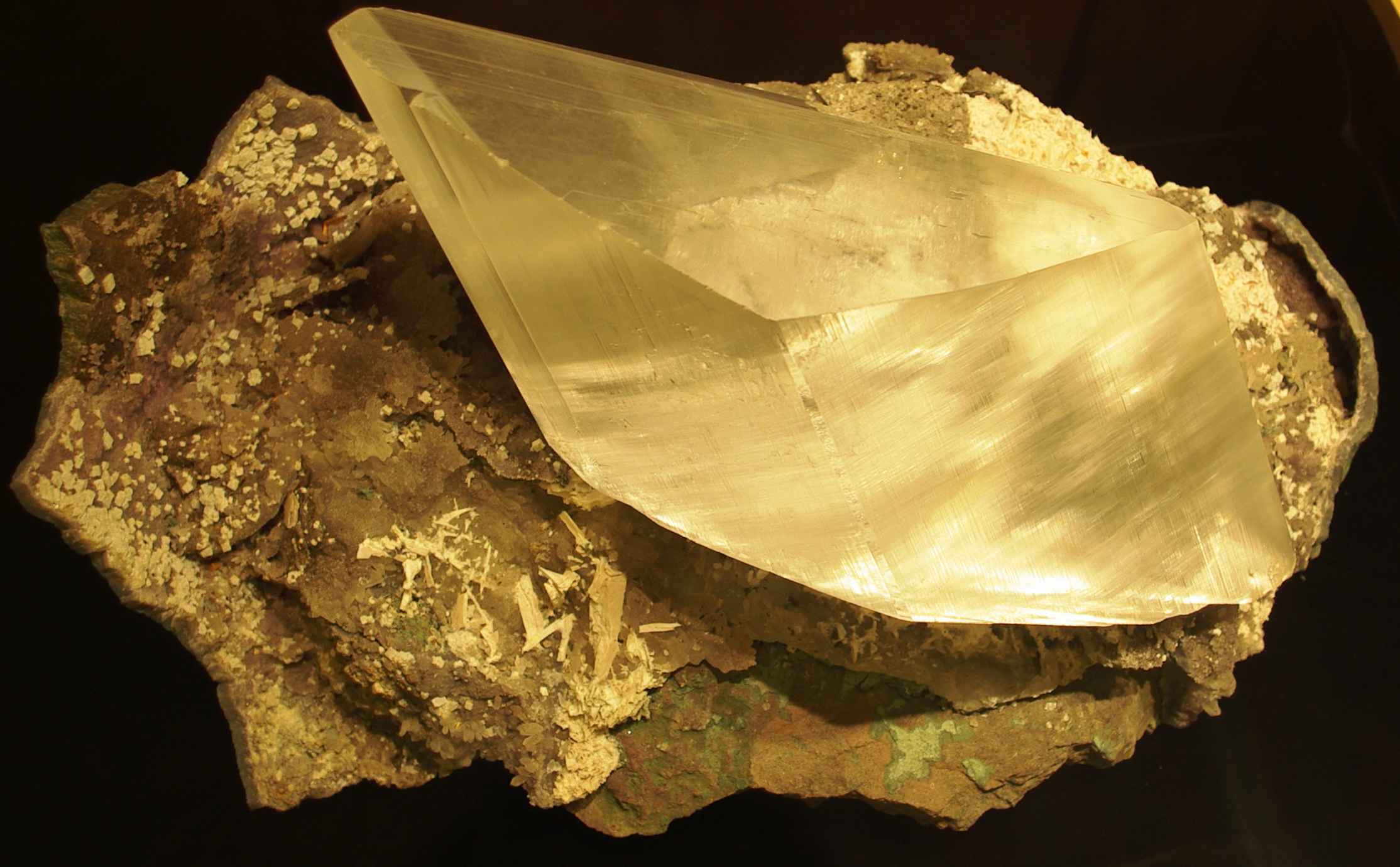
Gypsum (var. selenite) from Rio Grande Do Sul, Brazil

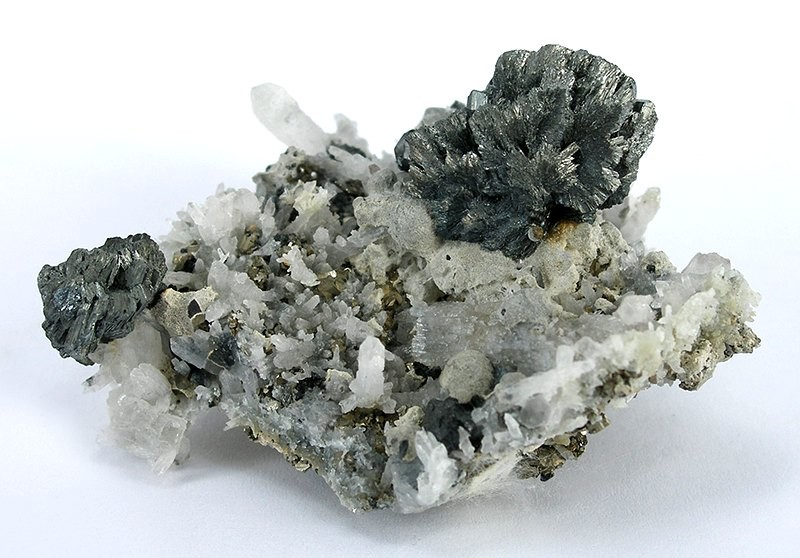
A spray of semseyite crystals perched at the apex of a cluster of quartz crystals

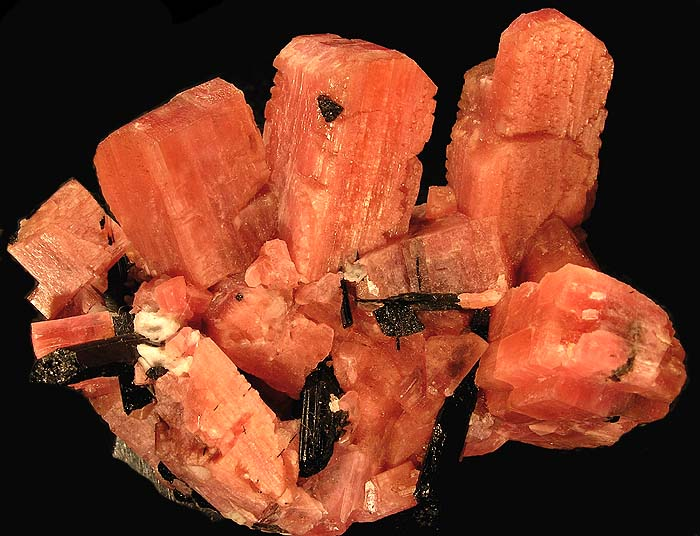
Serandite cluster

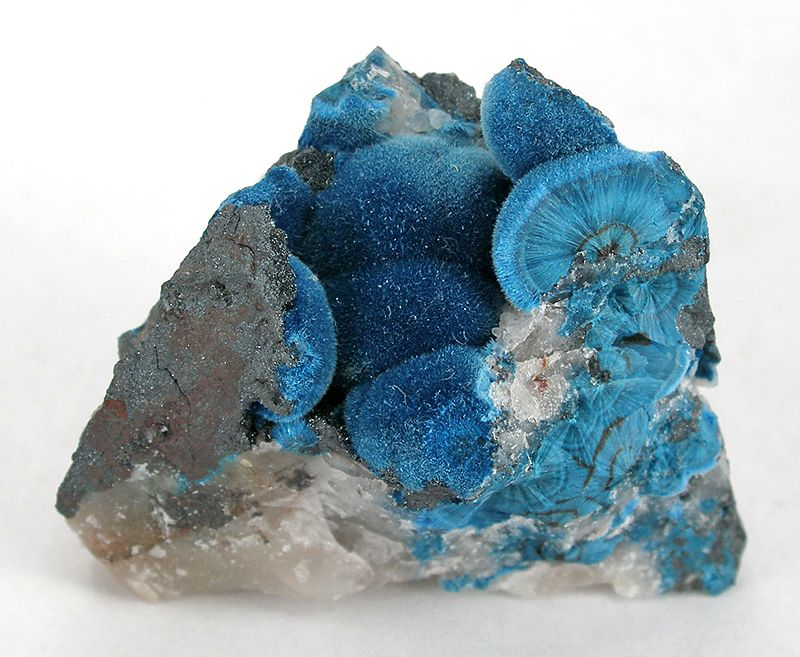
Botryoidal balls of shattuckite

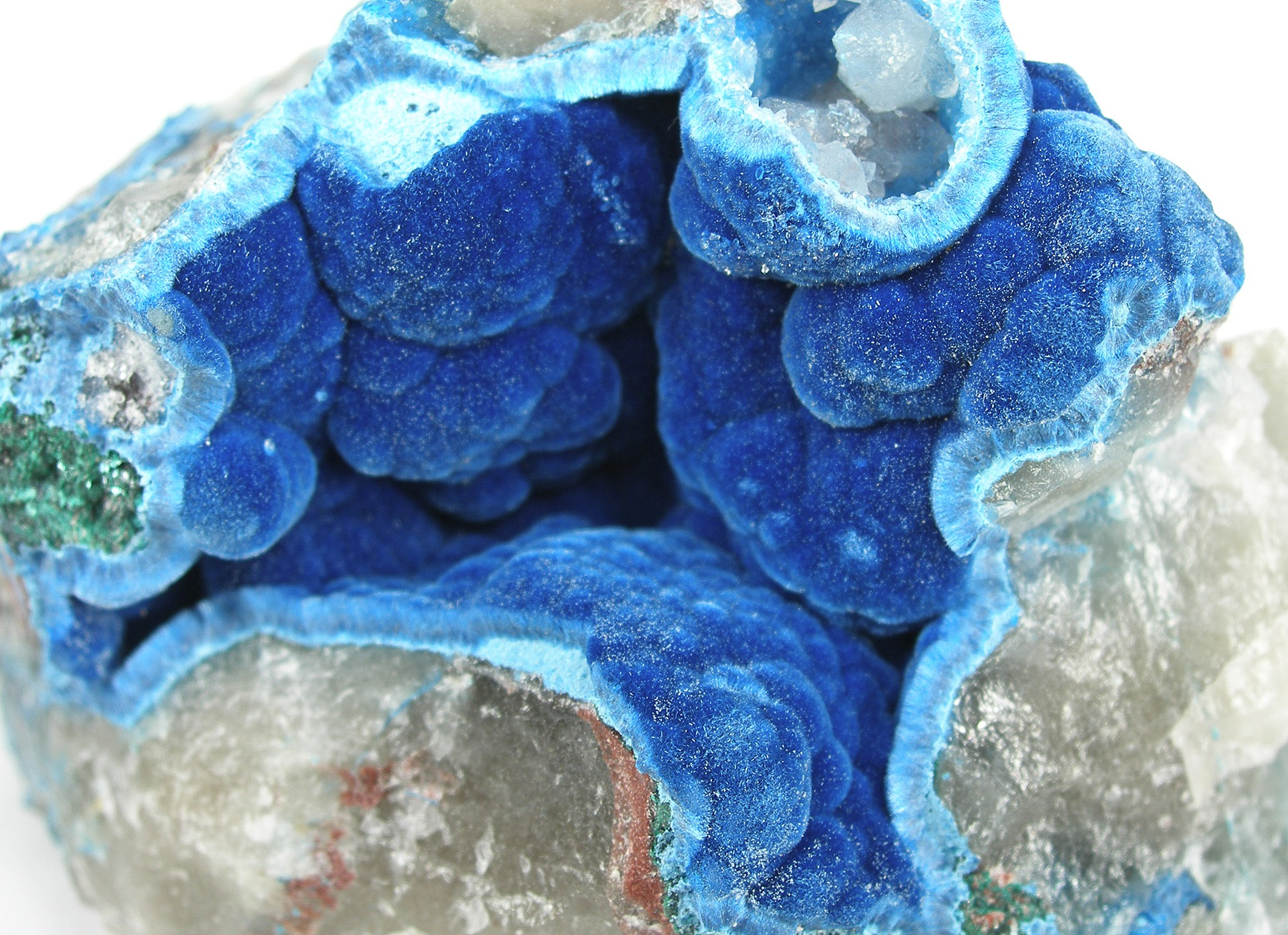
Quartz, shattuckite - Okenwasi Mine, Kaokoveld Plateau, Kunene Region, Namibia

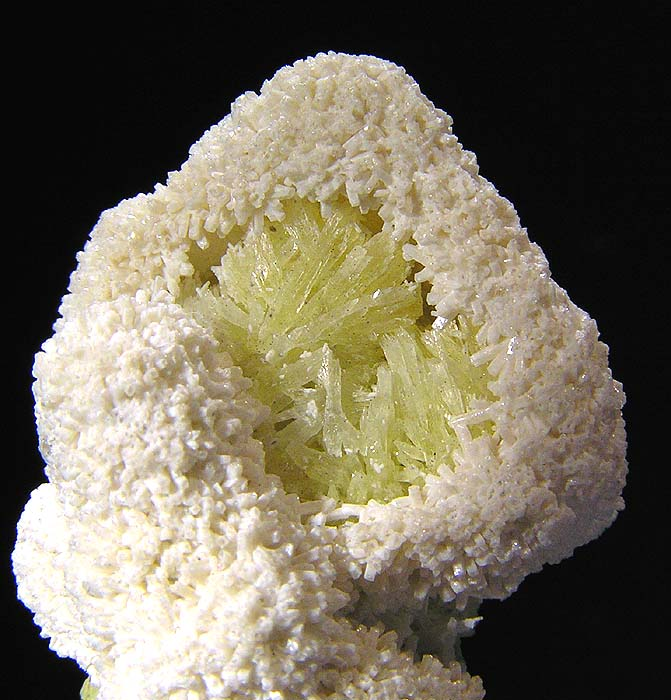
Lemon-yellow crystals of shortite

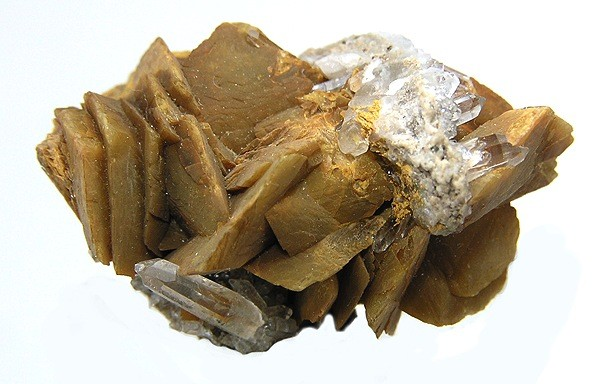
Siderite - Alice, Apex District, Gilpin County, Colorado, US

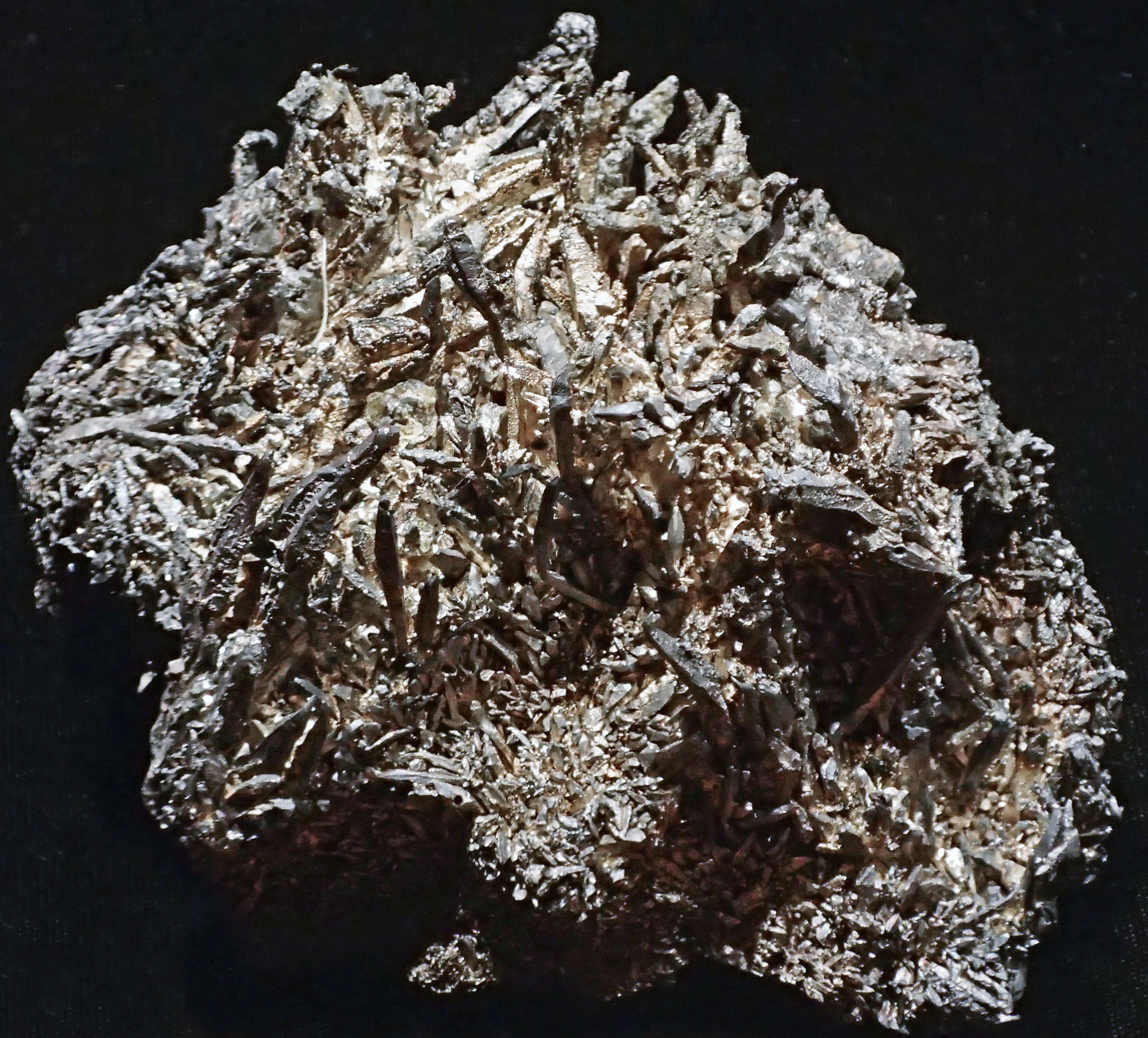
Silver from the Colorado, USA. Denver Museum of Nature & Science, Denver

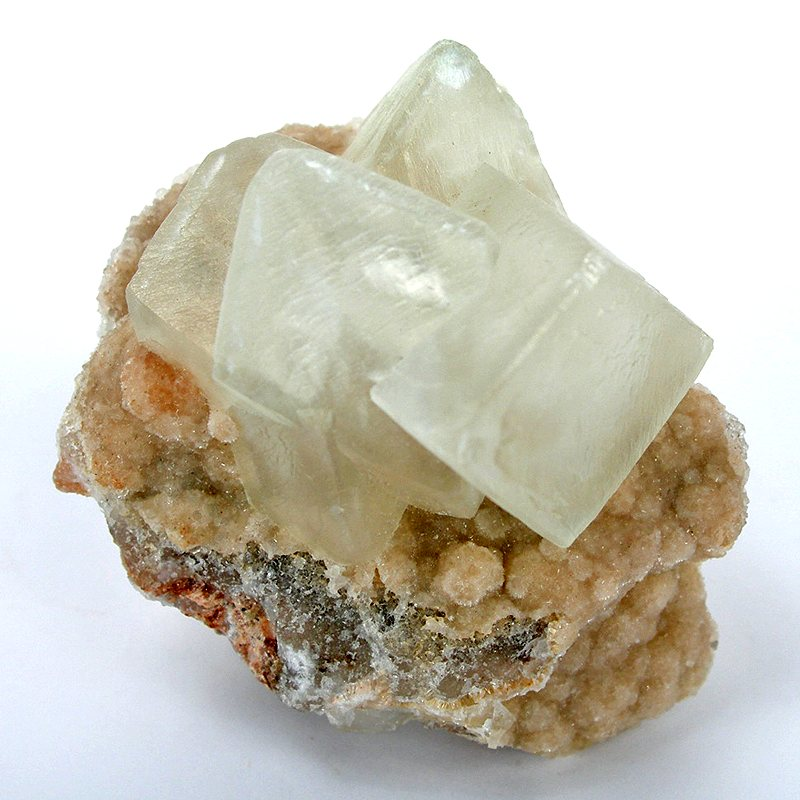
Smithsonite on willemite

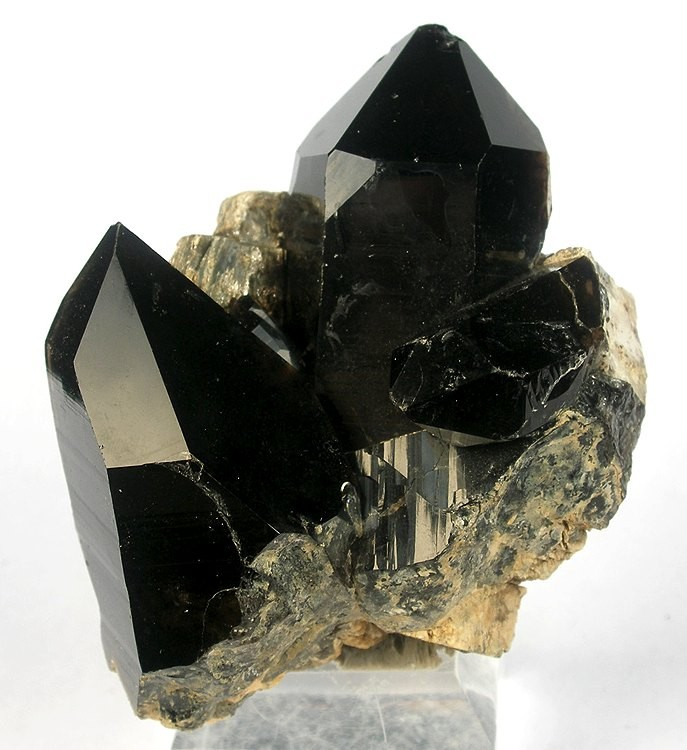
Ink-black smoky quartz crystals are framed by muscovite books and feldspar crystals

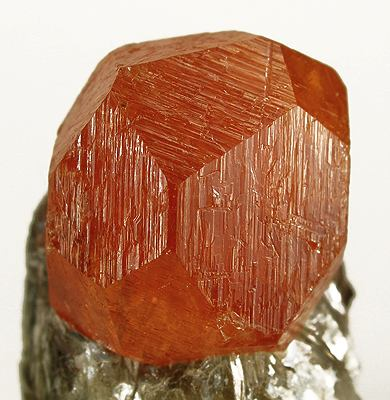
Spessartine on muscovite. Loliando, Tanzania

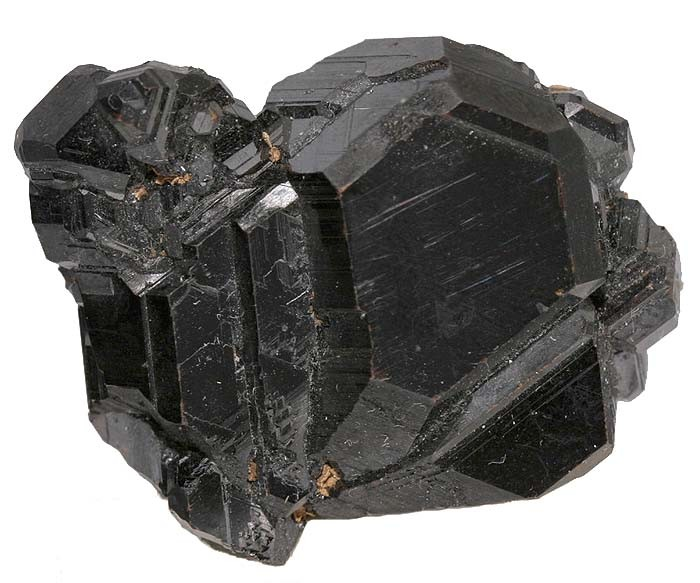
Sphalerite Dal'negorsk, Primorskiy Kray, Far-Eastern Region, Russia

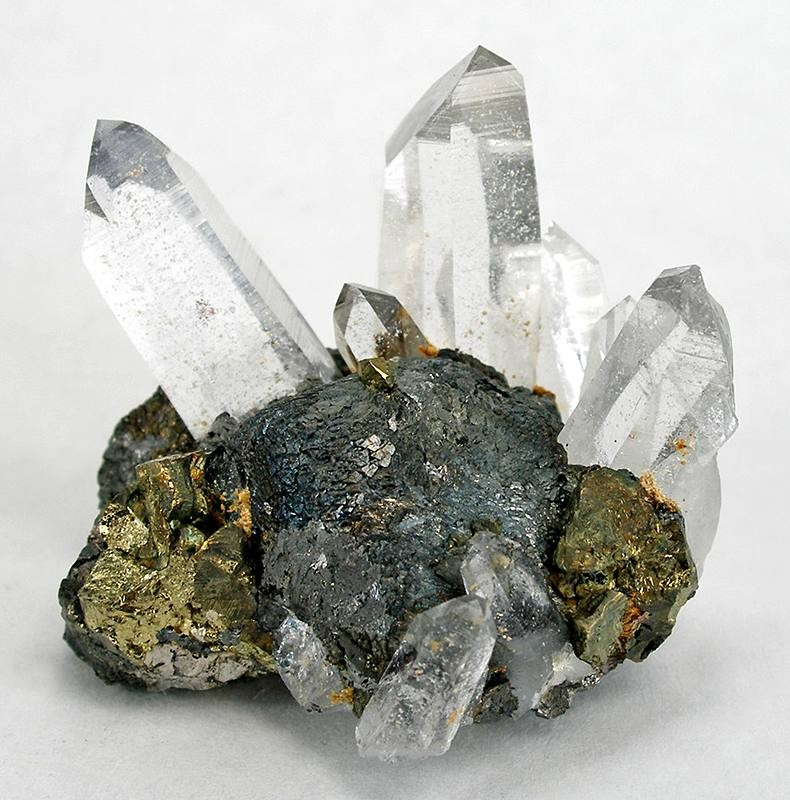
Ball of stepped stannite crystals flanked by splaying quartz at its upper edge

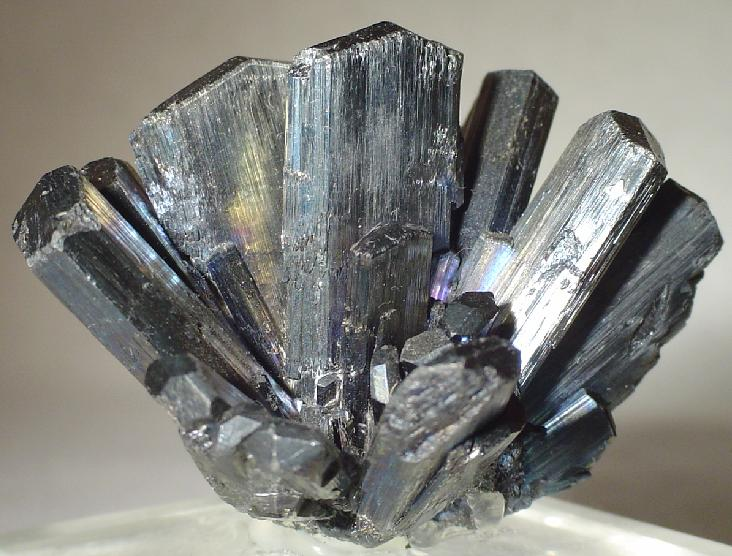
Spray of sharp, striated, iridescent metallic stibnite blades

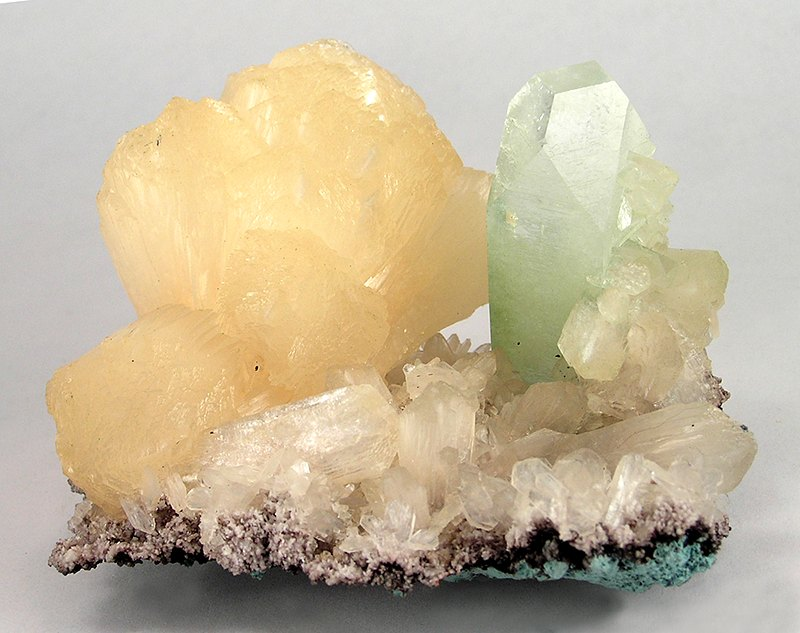
Stilbite and fluorapophyllite on stilbite

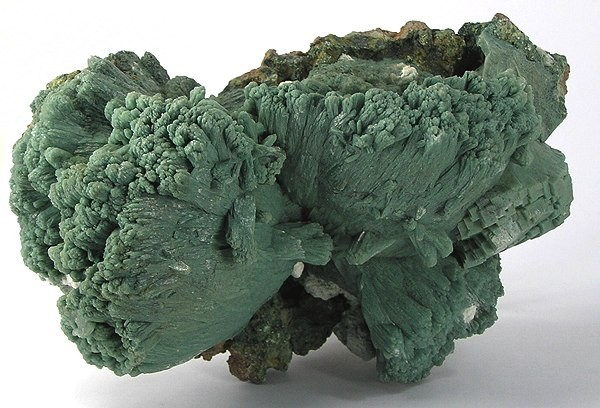
Specimen of green stilbite-Ca, which gets its color from inclusions of celadonite

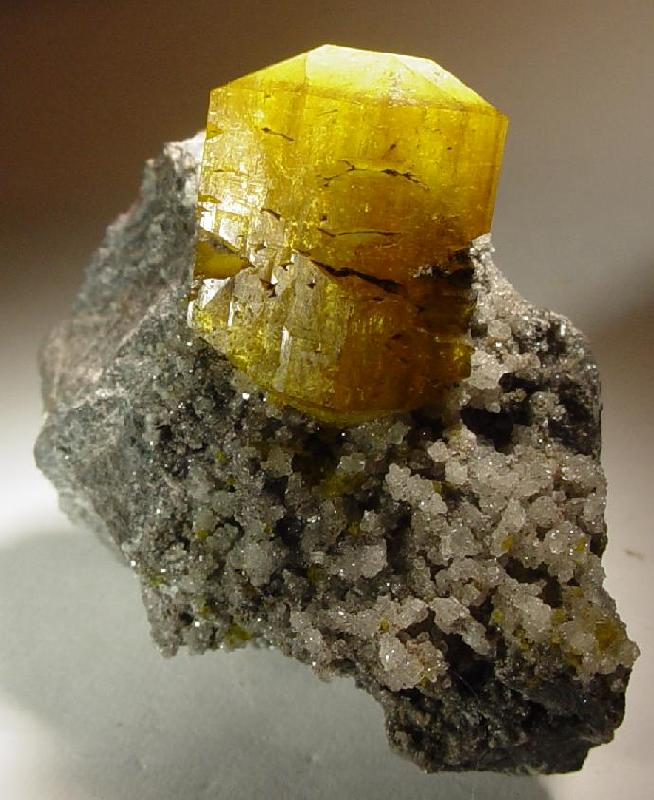
A lemon-colored sturmanite crystal perched atop a knoll of matrix

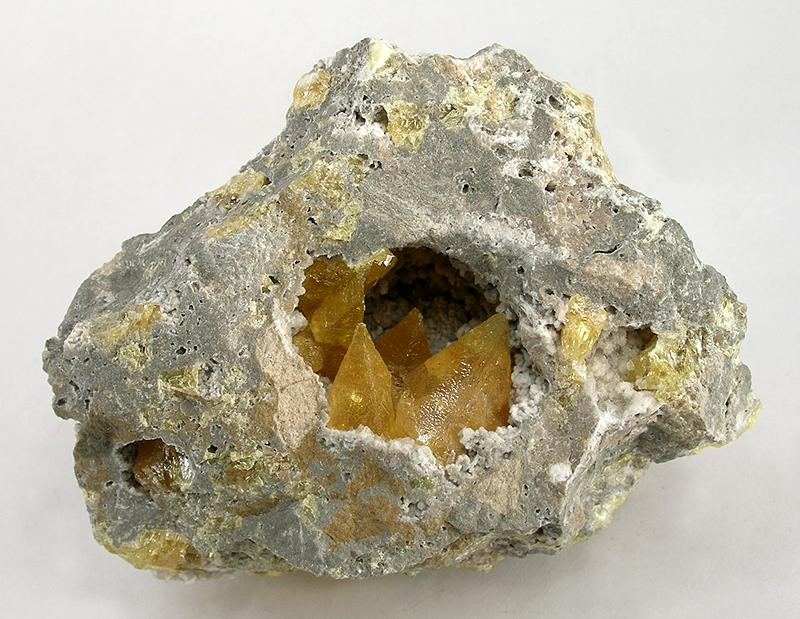
Five, golden-yellow, seemingly bi-pyramidal, crystals of sulfur, nestled in matrix vug

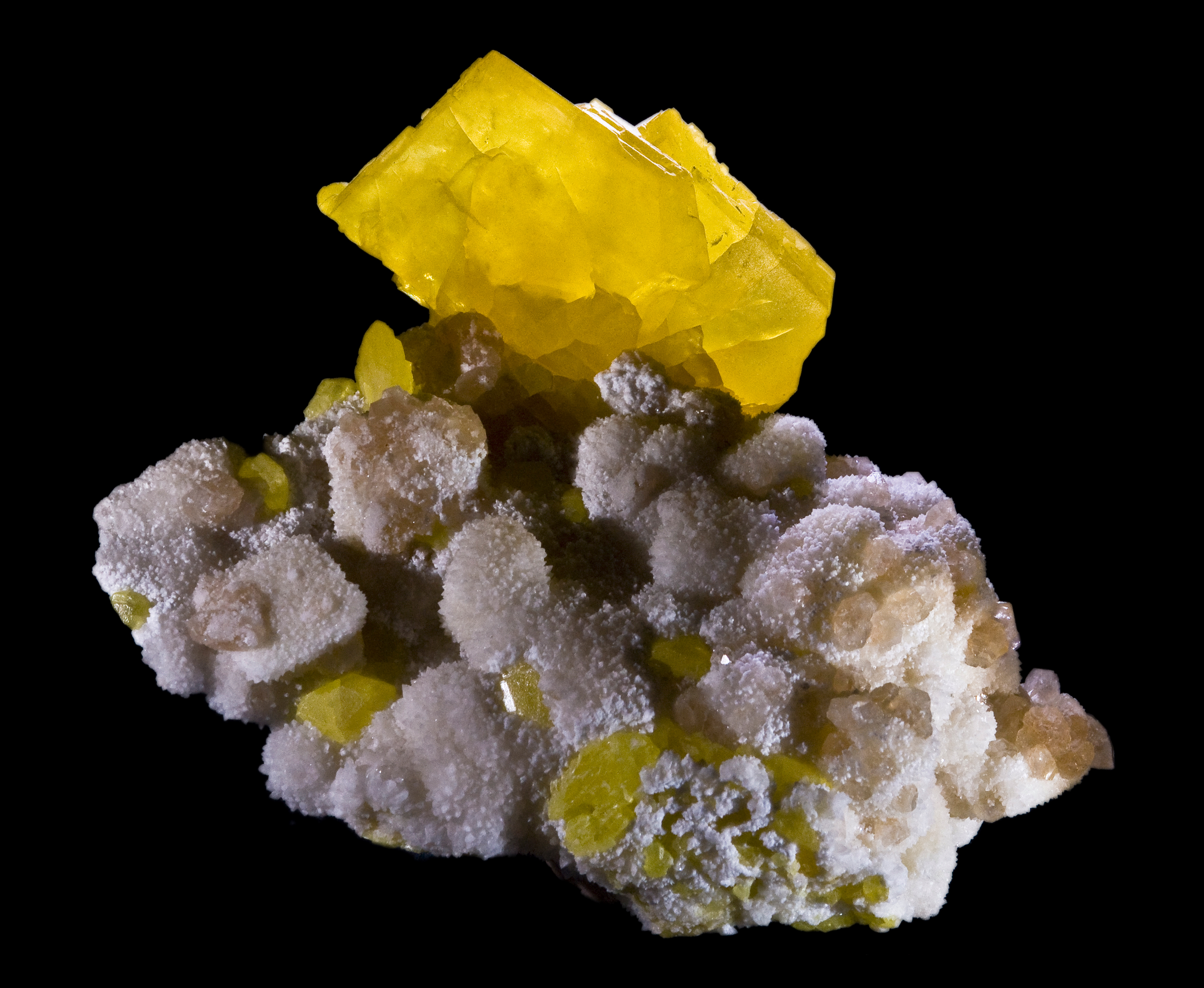
Sulfur, aragonite and celestine, from the Floristella Mine, Valguarnera, Enna Province, Sicily, Italy

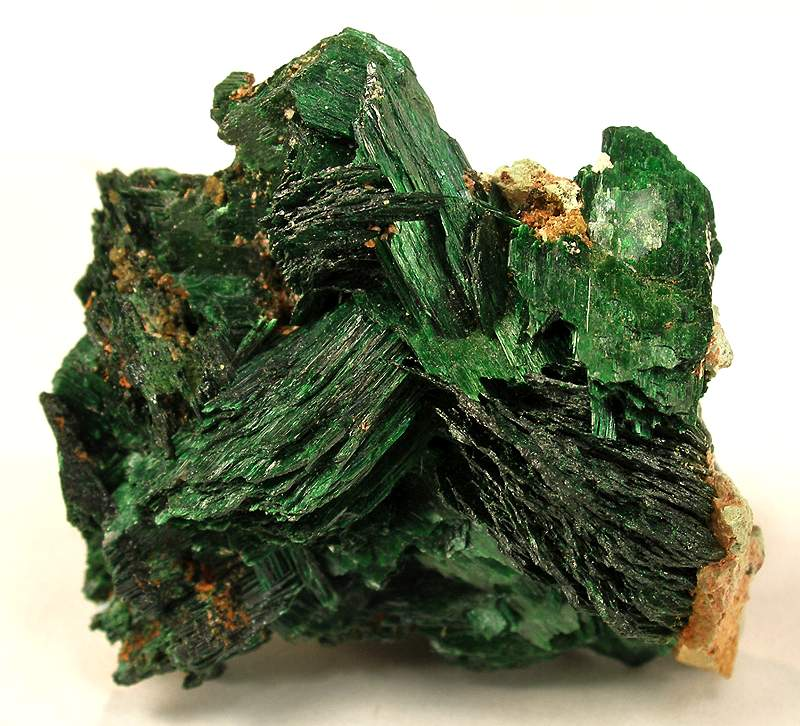
Brilliant green crystals of szenicsite

1. Saamite (seidozerite, lamprophyllite: IMA2013-083) 9.BE.25 [no] [no]
2. Sabatierite (IMA1976-043) 2.BD.45
  (IUPAC: hexacopper thallium tetraselenide)
3. Sabelliite (IMA1994-013) 8.BE.65
  (IUPAC: dicopper zinc trihydro arsenate)
4. Sabieite (sabieite: IMA1982-088) 7.AC.20
  (IUPAC: ammonium iron(III) disulfate)
5. Sabinaite (IMA1978-071) 5.BB.20
  (IUPAC: tetrasodium titanium dizirconium tetraoxide tetracarbonate)
6. Sabugalite (Y: 1951) 8.EB.55
  (IUPAC: hydrogen aluminium tetrauranyl tetraphosphate hexadecahydrate)
7. Saccoite (IMA2019-056) 7.0 [no] [no]
8. Sacrofanite (cancrinite-sodalite: IMA1979-058) 9.FB.05
9. Sadanagaite [Ca-amphibole: IMA2012 s.p., magnesiosadanagaite (IMA2002-051), 1984] 9.DE.15
10. Saddlebackite (tetradymite: IMA1994-051) 2.GC.40d
  (IUPAC: dilead dibismuth ditelluride trisulfide)
11. Safflorite (löllingite: 1835) 2.EB.15a
  (IUPAC: cobalt diarsenide)
12. Sahamalite-(Ce) (IMA1987 s.p., 1953) 5.AD.05
  (IUPAC: dicerium magnesium tetracarbonate)
13. Sahlinite (Y: 1934) 8.BO.20
  (IUPAC: tetradecalead tetrachloro nonaoxodiarsenate)
14. Sailaufite (arseniosiderite: IMA2000-005) 8.DH.30 [no]
15. Sainfeldite (hureaulite: IMA1963-018) 8.CB.10
  (IUPAC: pentacalcium diarsenate dihydroxoarsenate tetrahydrate)
16. Sakhaite (IMA1965-035) 6.AB.65
17. Sakuraiite (stannite: IMA1965-017) 2.CB.05b
  (IUPAC: tri(copper, zinc, iron) (indium, tin) tetrasulfide)
18. Salammoniac (IMA2007 s.p., 1556) 3.AA.25
  (IUPAC: ammonium chloride)
19. Saléeite (Y: 1932) 8.EB.05
  (IUPAC: magnesium diuranyl diphosphate deca(water))
20. Salesite (Y: 1939) 4.KB.05
  (IUPAC: copper hydro iodate)
21. Saliotite (corrensite: IMA1990-018) 9.EC.60 [no]
  Note: a regular 1:1 ordered interstratification of cookeite and paragonite.
22. Saltonseaite (rinneite: IMA2011-104) 3.0 [no] [no]
  (IUPAC: tripotassium sodium manganese hexachloride)
23. Salzburgite (meneghinite: IMA2000-044) 2.HB.05a
  (Cu_{1.6}Pb_{1.6}Bi_{6.4}S_{12})
24. Samaniite (IMA2007-038) 2.BB.
  (IUPAC: dicopper pentairon dinickel octasulfide)
25. Samarskite 4.DB.25
  1. Samarskite-(Y) (IMA1980 s.p., 1847) 4.DB.25
  2. Samarskite-(Yb) (IMA2004-001) 4.DB.25 [no]
    (IUPAC: ytterbium niobium tetraoxide)
26. Samfowlerite (IMA1991-045) 9.BF.10
27. Sampleite (lavendulan: 1942) 8.DG.05
  (IUPAC: sodium calcium pentacopper chloride tetraphosphate pentahydrate)
28. Samraite (IMA2021-029) 8.FA. [no] [no]
29. Samsonite (Y: 1910) 2.GA.15
  (IUPAC: tetrasilver manganese diantimony hexasulfide)
30. Samuelsonite (IMA1974-026) 8.BF.10
  (IUPAC: nonacalcium tetramanganese(II) dialuminium dihydroxide decaphosphate)
31. Sanbornite (Y: 1932) 9.EF.10
  (IUPAC: dibarium (decaoxy tetrasilicate))
32. Sanderite (Y: 1952) 7.CB.07 [no]
  (IUPAC: magnesium sulfate dihydrate)
33. Saneroite (IMA1979-060) 9.DK.15
34. Sangenaroite (IMA2019-014) 2.0 [no] [no]
35. Sanguite (IMA2013-002) 3.0 [no] [no]
  (IUPAC: potassium copper trichloride)
36. Sanidine (feldspar: 1808) 9.FA.30
  (IUPAC: potassium (aluminoctaoxotrisilicate))
37. Sanjuanite (sanjuanite-destinezite: IMA1966-043) 8.DB.30
  (IUPAC: dialuminium hydroxide phosphate sulfate nonahydrate)
38. Sanmartinite (wolframite: 1948) 4.DB.30
  (IUPAC: zinc (tungsten tetraoxide))
39. Sanrománite (IMA2006-009) 5.AC.30 [no]
  (IUPAC: disodium calcium trilead pentacarbonate)
40. Santabarbaraite (IMA2000-052) 8.CE.80 [no]
  (IUPAC: triiron(III) trihydro diphosphate pentahydrate)
41. Santaclaraite (IMA1979-005) 9.DK.10
  (IUPAC: calcium tetramanganese(II) tetradecaoxopentasilicate dihydroxide monohydrate)
42. Santafeite (hydrous vanadate: 1958) 8.DM.40
43. Santanaite (IMA1971-035) 7.FB.10
  (IUPAC: undecalead chromium hexadecaoxide)
44. Santarosaite (IMA2007-013) 6.BD.05
  (IUPAC: copper metaborate)
45. Santite (IMA1969-044) 6.EA.10
  (IUPAC: potassium tetrahydroxide hexaoxopentaborate dihydrate)
46. Saponite (montmorillonite, smectite: 1842) 9.EC.45
47. Sapozhnikovite (sodalite: IMA2021-030) 9.FB. [no] [no]
48. Sapphirine (sapphirine: 1819) 9.DH.45
49. Sarabauite (IMA1976-035) 2.MA.10
  (IUPAC: hexasulfa tetraantimonide · calcium decaoxide hexaantimonide)
50. Saranchianite (IMA2015-019) 7.0 [no] [no]
  (IUPAC: disodium copper disulfate)
51. Sarcolite (Y: 1807) 9.EH.15
52. Sarcopside (olivine: 1868) 8.AB.15
  (IUPAC: triiron(II) diphosphate)
53. Sardignaite (IMA2008-040) 4.0 [no] [no]
  (IUPAC: bismuth dimolybdenum hydroheptaoxide dihydrate)
54. Sarkinite (wagnerite: 1884) 8.BB.15
  (IUPAC: dimanganese(II) hydroxide arsenate)
55. Sarmientite (sanjuanite-destinezite: 1941) 8.DB.35
  (IUPAC: diron(III) hydroxide arsenate sulfate pentahydrate)
56. Sarrabusite (selenite: IMA1997-046a) 4.0 [no]
  (IUPAC: pentalead copper tetrachloro tetraselenite)
57. Sarrochite (IMA2021-116) 8.DM. [no] [no]
58. Sartorite (sartorite: 1868) 2.HC.05a
  (IUPAC: palladium diarsenic tetrasulfide)
59. Saryarkite-(Y) (IMA1987 s.p., 1964) 8.DO.25
60. Sasaite (IMA1977-033) 8.DB.55
  (IUPAC: hexaaluminium trihydro pentaphosphate hexatricontahydrate)
61. Sassolite (Y: 1778) 6.AA.05
  (IUPAC: boric acid)
62. Satimolite (IMA1967-023) 6.HA.15
  (IUPAC: potassium disodium tetraaluminium trichloro tri(pentaoxodiborate) tridecahydrate)
63. Satpaevite^{Q} (Y: 1959) 4.HG.65
64. Satterlyite (IMA1976-056) 8.BB.20
65. Sauconite (saponite, smectite: 1875) 9.EC.45
66. Savelievaite (ludwigite: IMA2021-051) 6.AB. [no] [no]
67. Sayrite (IMA1982-050) 4.GB.50
  (IUPAC: dilead pentauranyl dihydro hexaoxide tetrahydrate)
68. Sazhinite 9.EA.30
  (IUPAC: trisodium REE pentadecaoxyhexasilicate dihydrate)
  1. Sazhinite-(Ce) (IMA1973-060) 9.EA.30
  2. Sazhinite-(La) (IMA2002-042a) 9.EA.30 [no]
69. Sazykinaite-(Y) (IMA1992-031) 9.DM.10 [no]
  (IUPAC: pentasodium yttrium zirconium octadecaoxyhexasilicate hexahydrate)

=== Sb – Se ===
1. Sbacchiite (IMA2017-097) 3.CB.55 [no] [no]
2. Sborgite (Y: 1957) 6.EA.05
  (IUPAC: sodium tetrahydroxide hexaoxopentaborate trihydrate)
3. Scacchite (Y: 1855) 3.AB.20
  (IUPAC: manganese dichloride)
4. Scainiite (IMA1996-014) 2.JB.35b
  (Pb_{14}Sb_{30}S_{54}O_{5})
5. Scandio-winchite (sodium-calcium amphibole: IMA2022-009) 9.DE. [no] [no]
6. Scandiobabingtonite (rhodonite: IMA1993-012) 9.DK.05 [no]
7. Scarbroite (Y: 1829) 5.DA.35
  (IUPAC: pentaluminium tridecahydroxide carbonate pentahydrate)
8. Scawtite (Y: 1930) 9.CK.15
  (IUPAC: heptacalcium di(nonaoxotrisilicate) carbonate dihydrate)
9. Scenicite (IMA2021-057) 7.EA. [no] [no]
10. Schachnerite (amalgam: IMA1971-055) 1.AD.15a
  (2Ag1.1Hg0.9)
11. Schafarzikite (trippkeite: 1921) 4.JA.20
  (IUPAC: iron(II) diantimony(III) tetraoxide)
12. Schäferite (garnet: IMA1997-048) 8.AC.25 [no]
  (IUPAC: sodium dicalcium dimagnesium trivanadate)
13. Schairerite (Y: 1931) 07.BD.10
  (IUPAC: henicosasodium chloride hexafluoride heptasulfate)
14. Schallerite (pyrosmalite: 1925) 9.EE.15
15. Schapbachite (galena, rocksalt: IMA1982 s.p., 1853 Rd) 02.JA.15 [no]
  (Ag_{0.4}Pb_{0.2}Bi_{0.4}S)
16. Schaurteite (fleischerite: 1988 s.p., 1967) 7.DF.25
  (IUPAC: tricalcium germanium(IV) hexahydroxide disulfate trihydrate)
17. Scheelite (scheelite: 1821) 7.GA.05
  (IUPAC: calcium tungstate)
18. Schertelite (Y: 1887) 8.CH.30
  (IUPAC: diammonium magnesium dihydrogen diphosphate tetrahydrate)
19. Scheuchzerite (IMA2004-044) 9.DM.35 [no]
20. Schiavinatoite (zircon: IMA1999-051) 6.AC.15
  (IUPAC: niobium tetraoxoborate)
21. Schieffelinite (lead-tellurium oxysalt: IMA1979-043) 7.CD.55
22. Schindlerite (decavanadate: IMA2012-063) 4.0 [no]
23. Schizolite (pectolite: IMA2018-B, IMA2013-067, 1901) 9.0 [no] [no]
  (IUPAC: sodium calcium manganese octaoxo trisilicate hydroxide)
24. Schlegelite (IMA2003-051) 8.BO.45 [no]
  (IUPAC: heptabismuth tetraoxo dimolybdate triarsenate)
25. Schlemaite (IMA2003-026) 2.BE.25
  ((Cu,◻)_{6}(Pb,Bi)Se_{4})
26. Schlossmacherite (alunite, alunite: IMA1979-028 Rd) 7.BC.10
  (IUPAC: hydronium trialuminium hexahydroxide disulfate)
27. Schlüterite-(Y) (epidote: IMA2012-015) 9.B?. [no] [no]
28. Schmidite (schoonerite, calcioferrite: IMA2017-012) 8.0 [no] [no]
29. Schmiederite (linarite: 1963) 7.BC.65
  (IUPAC: dicopper dilead tetrahydroxide selenite selenate)
30. Schmitterite (uranyl tellurite: IMA1967-045) 4.JK.70
  (IUPAC: uranyl tellurite)
31. Schneebergite (tsumcorite: IMA1999-027) 8.CG.15
  (IUPAC: bismuth dicobalt hydroxide diarsenate monohydrate)
32. Schneiderhöhnite (IMA1973-046) 4.JA.35
  (IUPAC: iron(II) triiron(III) pentarsenic(III) tridecaoxide)
33. Schoderite (IMA1962 s.p.) 8.CE.70
  (IUPAC: dialuminium phosphate vanadate octahydrate)
34. Schoenfliesite (schoenfliesite: IMA1968-008) 4.FC.10
  (IUPAC: magnesium tin hexahydroxide)
35. Schoepite (IMA1962 s.p., 1923) 4.GA.05
  (IUPAC: octauranyl dioxo dodecahydroxide dodecahydrate)
36. Schöllhornite (IMA1984-043) 2.FB.05
  (Na_{0.3}CrS_{2}·H_{2}O)
37. Scholzite (Y: 1948) 8.CA.45
  (IUPAC: calcium dizinc diphosphate dihydrate)
38. Schoonerite (schoonerite, calcioferrite: IMA1976-021) 8.DB.15
  (IUPAC: zinc manganese(II) diiron(II) iron(III) dihydroxide triphosphate nonahydrate)
39. Schorl (tourmaline: IMA2007 s.p., 1505) 9.CK.05
  (IUPAC: sodium triiron(II) hexaluminium octadecaoxohexasilicate triborate tetrahydroxide)
40. Schorlomite (garnet: 1846) 9.AD.25
  (IUPAC: tricalcium dititanium diiron(III) silicate dodecaoxide)
41. Schreibersite (phosphide: 1848) 1.BD.05
  (IUPAC: tri(iron, nickel) phosphide)
42. Schreyerite (schreyerite: IMA1976-004) 4.CB.35
  (IUPAC: divanadium(III) trititanium(IV) nonaoxide)
43. Schröckingerite (Y: 1873) 5.EG.05
  (IUPAC: sodium tricalcium uranyl fluoro sulfate tricarbonate decahydrate)
44. Schubnelite (IMA1970-015) 8.CB.35
  (IUPAC: iron(III) tetraoxovanadate(V) monohydrate)
45. Schuetteite (IMA1962 s.p., 1959) 7.BB.40
  (IUPAC: trimercury dioxosulfate)
46. Schuilingite-(Nd) (IMA1987 s.p., 1948) 5.DB.20
  (IUPAC: dicopper dipalladium dineodymium dihydro hexacarbonate trihydrate)
47. Schulenbergite (ktenasite: IMA1982-074) 7.DD.80
  (IUPAC: hepta(copper, zinc) decahydroxide disulfate trihydrate)
48. Schüllerite (seidozerite, murmanite: IMA2010-035) 9.BE.25 [no] [no]
  (IUPAC: dibarium dititanium disodium dimagnesium di(heptaoxodisilicate) dioxodifluorine)
49. Schultenite (Y: 1926) 8.AD.30
  (IUPAC: lead hydroxoarsenate)
50. Schumacherite (IMA1982-023) 8.BO.10
  (IUPAC: tribismuth hydroxide oxide divanadate)
51. Schwartzembergite (Y: 1868) 4.KB.10
  (IUPAC: pentalead(II) dihydrogen iodine(III) trichloride hexaoxide)
52. Schwertmannite (IMA1990-006) 7.DE.15
53. Sclarite (IMA1988-026) 5.BA.30
  (IUPAC: heptazinc decahydroxide dicarbonate)
54. Scolecite (zeolitic tectosilicate: IMA1997 s.p., 1813) 9.GA.05
  (IUPAC: calcium dialuminotrisilicate decaoxo trihydrate)
55. Scordariite (IMA2019-010) 7.0 [no] [no]
56. Scorodite (Y: 1818) 8.CD.10
  (IUPAC: iron(III) arsenate dihydrate)
57. Scorticoite (welinite: IMA2018-159) 9.0 [no] [no]
58. Scorzalite (lazulite: 1949) 8.BB.40
  (IUPAC: iron(II) dialuminium dihydroxide diphosphate)
59. Scotlandite (IMA1982-001) 4.JE.20
  (IUPAC: lead sulfite)
60. Scottyite (IMA2012-027) 9.0 [no] [no]
  (IUPAC: barium dicopper heptaoxodisilicate)
61. Scrutinyite (columbite: IMA1984-061) 4.DB.20
  (IUPAC: α-lead dioxide)
62. Seaborgite (IMA019-087) 7.0 [no] [no]
63. Seamanite (Y: 1930) 6.AC.65
  (IUPAC: trimanganese(II) tetrahydroborate dihydroxide phosphate)
64. Searlesite (Y: 1914) 9.EF.15
  (IUPAC: sodium boron pentaoxy disilicate dihydroxide)
65. Sederholmite (nickeline: IMA1967 s.p., 1964) 2.CC.05
  (IUPAC: β-nickel selenide)
66. Sedovite (IMA1968 s.p., 1965) 7.HA.05
  (IUPAC: uranium(IV) dimolybdate)
67. Seeligerite (IMA1970-036) 4.KB.15
  (IUPAC: trilead trichloro iodate)
68. Seelite (IMA1992-005) 4.JD.10
  (IUPAC: magnesium diuranyl di(arsenite, arsenate) heptahydrate)
69. Segelerite (overite: IMA1973-023) 8.DH.20
  (IUPAC: calcium magnesium iron(III) hydro diphosphate tetrahydrate)
70. Segerstromite (IMA2014-001) 8.0 [no] [no]
  (IUPAC: tricalcium diarsenate di[trihydro arsenite])
71. Segnitite (alunite, crandallite: IMA1991-017) 8.BL.10
  (IUPAC: lead triiron(III) arsenate hexahydro hydroxoarsenate)
72. Seidite-(Ce) (IMA1993-029) 9.DJ.20 [no]
73. Seidozerite (seidozerite, rinkite: 1958) 9.BE.25
  (IUPAC: disodium dizirconium disodium manganese titanium di(heptaoxodisilicate) dioxy difluoride)
74. Seifertite (IMA2004-010) 4.DA.50
  (IUPAC: silicon dioxide)
75. Seinäjokite (löllingite: IMA1976-001) 2.EB.15b
  (IUPAC: iron diantimonide)
76. Sejkoraite-(Y) (zippeite: IMA2009-008) 7.EC.15 [no] [no]
77. Sekaninaite (beryl: IMA1967-047) 9.CJ.10
  (IUPAC: diiron(II) tetraluminium octadecaoxopentasilicate)
78. Selenium (element: 1828?) 1.CC.10
79. Selenojalpaite (IMA2004-048) 2.BA.45
  (IUPAC: trisilver copper diselenide)
80. Selenopolybasite (pearceite-polybasite: IMA2006-053) 2.GB.15
  (Cu(Ag,Cu)_{6}Ag_{9}Sb_{2}(S,Se)_{9}Se_{2})
81. Selenostephanite (IMA1982-028) 2.GB.10
  (IUPAC: pentasilver antimony tetra(selenide, sulfide))
82. Seligmannite (Y: 1901) 2.GA.50
  (IUPAC: copper lead trisulfa arsenide)
83. Selivanovaite (IMA2015-126) 9.B?. [no] [no]
84. Sellaite (rutile: 1869) 3.AB.15
  (IUPAC: magnesium difluoride)
85. Selwynite (IMA1993-037) 8.CA.20
  (IUPAC: sodium potassium beryllium dizirconium tetraphosphate dihydrate)
86. Semenovite-(Ce) (IMA1971-036) 9.DN.10
87. Semseyite (plagionite: 1881) 2.HC.10d
  (Pb_{9}Sb_{8}S_{21})
88. Senaite (crichtonite: 1898) 4.CC.40
89. Senandorite (lillianite: andorite VI, 1892) 2.JB. [no]
90. Senarmontite (IMA2015-E, 1851) 4.CB.50
  (IUPAC: diantimony trioxide)
91. Senegalite (IMA1975-004) 8.DE.05
  (IUPAC: dialuminium trihydroxide phosphate monohydrate)
92. Sengierite (IMA2007 s.p., 1949) 4.HB.10
  (IUPAC: dicopper diuranyl divanadate hexahydrate)
93. Senkevichite (IMA2004-017) 9.DG.75 [no]
  (IUPAC: caesium sodium potassium dicalcium titanium oxide octadecaoxyheptasilicate hydroxide)
94. Sepiolite (sepiolite: 1847) 9.EE.25
95. Serandite (pectolite: IMA2015-E, 1931) 9.DG.05
  (IUPAC: sodium dimanganese(II) octaoxotrisilicate hydroxide)
96. Serendibite (sapphirine: 1903) 9.DH.40
97. Sergeevite (IMA1979-038) 5.DB.25
  (Ca_{2}Mg_{11}(CO_{3})_{9}(HCO_{3})_{4}(OH)_{4}·6H_{2}O)
98. Sergevanite (eudialyte: IMA2019-057) 9.C [no] [no]
99. Sergeysmirnovite (IMA2021-033) [no] [no]
100. Serpentine subgroup, kaolinite-serpentine group 09.ED.NN [no] [no]
101. Serpierite (devilline: 1881) 7.DD.30
  (IUPAC: calcium tetra(copper, zinc) hexahydroxide disulfate trihydrate)
102. Serrabrancaite (kieserite: IMA1998-006) 8.CB.05 [no]
  (IUPAC: manganese phosphate monohydrate)
103. Sewardite (carminite: IMA2001-054) 8.BH.30 [no]
  (IUPAC: calcium diiron(III) dihydroxide diarsenate)

=== Sh – Sr ===
1. Shabaite-(Nd) (IMA1988-005) 5.EE.10
  (IUPAC: calcium diniobium uranyl dihydroxide tetracarbonate hexahydrate)
2. Shabynite (IMA1979-075) 6.AB.55
  (IUPAC: pentamagnesium pentahydroxide dichloro trioxoborate tetrahydrate)
3. Shadlunite (pentlandite: IMA1972-012) 2.BB.15
  (IUPAC: octa(iron, copper) (lead, cadmium) octasulfide)
4. Shafranovskite (IMA1981-048) 9.EE.65
5. Shagamite (magnetoplumbite: IMA2020-091) 4.0 [no] [no]
6. Shakhovite (IMA1980-069) 4.FB.05
  (IUPAC: dimercurous dimercuric antimonite trihydroxide)
7. Shandite (Y: 1949) 2.BE.15
  (IUPAC: trinickel dilead disulfide)
8. Shannonite (IMA1993-053) 5.BE.05
  (IUPAC: dilead carbonate oxide)
9. Sharpite (Y: 1938) 5.EA.35
  (IUPAC: calcium triuranyl tetracarbonate trihydrate)
10. Sharyginite (brownmillerite: IMA2017-014) 4.0 [no] [no]
  (IUPAC: tricalcium titanium diiron octaoxide)
11. Shasuite (IMA2021-020) 8.FA. [no] [no]
12. Shattuckite (IMA1967 s.p., 1915 Rd) 9.DB.40
  (IUPAC: pentacopper tetra(trioxosilicate) dihydroxide)
13. Shcherbakovite (batisite: 1954) 9.DH.20
  (IUPAC: dipotassium sodium dititanium dioxide dodecaoxytetrasilicate)
14. Shcherbinaite (IMA1971-021) 4.HE.10
  (IUPAC: divanadium(V) pentaoxide)
15. Shchurovskyite (IMA2013-078) 8.0 [no] [no]
  (IUPAC: dipotassium calcium hexacopper dioxide tetraarsenate)
16. Sheldrickite (IMA1996-019) 5.DC.15
  (IUPAC: sodium tricalcium trifluoro dicarbonate monohydrate)
17. Shenzhuangite (chalcopyrite: IMA2017-018) 2.0 [no] [no]
  (IUPAC: nickel iron disulfide)
18. Sherwoodite (Y: 1958) 4.HC.15
19. Shibkovite (milarite: IMA1997-018) 9.CM.05 [no]
  (IUPAC: dipotassium dicalcium trizinc triacontaoxydodecasilicate )
20. Shigaite (hydrotalcite: IMA1984-057) 7.DD.35
21. Shijiangshanite (IMA2022-029) 9.DK. [no] [no]
22. Shilovite (nitrate: IMA2014-016) 5.0 [no] [no]
  (IUPAC: copper tetraammonium dinitrate)
23. Shimazakiite (IMA2010-085a) 6.0 [no] [no]
  (IUPAC: dicalcium pentaoxodiborate)
24. Shimenite (chabournéite: IMA2019-069) 2.HD. [no] [no]
25. Shinarumpite (IMA2021-105) 7.EB.I [no] [no]
26. Shinkolobweite (IMA2016-095) 4.0 [no] [no]
27. Shirokshinite (mica: IMA2001-063) 9.EC.20 [no]
  (IUPAC: potassium (dimagnesium sodium) decaoxotetrasilicate difluoride)
28. Shirozulite (mica: IMA2001-045) 9.EC.20 [no]
  (IUPAC: potassium trimanganese(II) (aluminotrisilicate) decaoxy dihydroxide)
29. Shkatulkalite (seidozerite, lamprophyllite: IMA1993-058) 9.BE.50 [no]
  (IUPAC: decasodium manganese trititanium triniobium hexa(heptaoxodisilicate) dihydroxide fluorine dodecahydrate)
30. Shlykovite (IMA2008-062) 9.E?.
  (IUPAC: potassium calcium [nonaoxyhydroxytetrasilicate] trihydrate)
31. Shomiokite-(Y) (IMA1990-015) 5.CC.20
  (IUPAC: trisodium yttrium tricarbonate trihydrate)
32. Shortite (Y: 1939) 5.AC.25
  (IUPAC: disodium dicalcium tricarbonate)
33. Shosanbetsuite (tin alloy: IMA2018-162) 1.0 [no] [no]
  (IUPAC: trisilver tin alloy)
34. Shuangfengite (IMA1993-018) 2.EA.20
  (IUPAC: iridium ditelluride)
35. Shubnikovite^{Q} (Y: 1953) 8.DG.05
  Note: it might be lavendulan, sampleite or zdenekite (Giester et al., 2007).
36. Shuiskite
  1. Shuiskite-(Cr) (IMA2019-117) 9.BG. [no] [no]
  2. Shuiskite-(Mg) (IMA1980-061) 9.BG.20
    (IUPAC: dicalcium magnesium dichromium tetraoxosilicate heptaoxodisilicate dihydroxyl monohydrate)
37. Shulamitite (brownmillerite: IMA2011-016) 4.0 [no] [no]
  (IUPAC: tricalcium titanium iron(III) aluminium octaoxide)
38. Shumwayite (IMA2015-058) 7.0 [no] [no]
  (IUPAC: di[uranyl sulfate diwater] monohydrate)
39. Shuvalovite (IMA2014-057) 7.0 [no] [no]
  (IUPAC: dipotassium (dicalcium sodium) fluoro trisulfate)
40. Sibirskite (Y: 1962) 6.BC.20
  (IUPAC: calcium hydro (hydrogen pentaoxodiborate))
41. Sicherite (IMA1997-051) 2.HD.55 [no]
  (IUPAC: thallium disilver hexasulfa tri(arsenide, antimonide))
42. Sicklerite (olivine: 1912) 8.AB.10
  (IUPAC: lithium manganese(II) phosphate)
43. Siderazot (nitride: 1876) 1.BC.10
  (IUPAC: pentairon dinitride)
44. Siderite (calcite: IMA1962 s.p., 1845) 5.AB.05
  (IUPAC: iron(II) carbonate)
45. Sideronatrite (Y: 1878) 7.DF.20
  (IUPAC: disodium iron(III) hydrogen disulfate trihydrate)
46. Siderophyllite (mica: IMA1998 s.p., 1881) 9.EC.20
  (IUPAC: potassium diron(II) aluminum (dialuminodisilicate) decaoxy dihydroxide)
47. Siderotil (chalcanthite: IMA1963 s.p., IMA1962-006a Rd) 7.CB.20
  (IUPAC: (iron(II),copper) sulfate pentahydrate)
48. Sidorenkite (bradleyite: IMA1978-013) 5.BF.10
  (IUPAC: trisodium manganese phosphate carbonate)
49. Sidpietersite (thiosulphate: IMA1998-036) 7.JA.05
  (IUPAC: tetralead(II) dioxide dihydroxide thiosulphate)
50. Sidwillite (IMA1983-089) 4.FJ.05
  (IUPAC: molybdenum trioxide dihydrate)
51. Siegenite (spinel, linnaeite: 1850) 2.DA.05
  (IUPAC: cobalt dinickel tetrasulfide)
52. Sieleckiite (IMA1987-023) 8.DF.25
  (IUPAC: tricopper tetraaluminium dodecahydroxide diphosphate dihydrate)
53. Sigismundite (arrojadite: IMA22-C, IMA1994-033) 8.BF.05
54. Sigloite (laueite, laueite: IMA1967 s.p., 1962) 8.DC.30
  (IUPAC: iron(III) dialuminium trihydroxide diphosphate heptahydrate)
55. Siidraite (IMA2016-039) 3.0 [no] [no]
  (IUPAC: dilead copper trihydroxide triodide)
56. Silesiaite (kristiansenite: IMA2017-064) 9.B?. [no] [no]
  (IUPAC: dicalcium iron(III) tin heptaoxodisilicate hydrohexaoxodisilicate)
57. Silhydrite (IMA1970-044) 4.FM.30
  (IUPAC: tri(dioxosilicate) monohydrate)
58. Silicocarnotite (IMA2013-139) 8.0 [no] [no]
  (IUPAC: pentacalcium [phosphate tetraoxosilicate] phosphate)
59. Silicon (element: IMA1982-099) 1.CB.15 [no]
60. Silinaite (IMA1990-028) 9.EF.20
  (IUPAC: sodium lithium pentaoxodisilicate dihydrate)
61. Sillénite (Y: 1943) 4.CB.70
  (IUPAC: dodecabismuth silicon icosaoxide)
62. Sillimanite (Y: 1824) 9.AF.05
  (IUPAC: dialuminopentaoxosilicate)
63. Silver (element: old) 1.AA.05
64. Silvialite (scapolite: IMA1998-010) 9.FB.15 [no]
  (IUPAC: tetracalcium hexaaluminotetraicosaoxohexasilicate sulfate)
65. Simferite (olivine: IMA1989-016) 8.AB.10
66. Simmonsite (double perovskite: IMA1997-045) 3.CB.15
  (IUPAC: disodium lithium hexafluoroaluminate)
67. Simonellite (Y: 1919) 10.BA.45
  (IUPAC: 1,1-dimethyl-1,2,3,4-tetrahydro-7-isopropyl phenanthrene)
68. Simonite (IMA1982-052) 2.GC.20
  (IUPAC: thallium mercury hexasulfa triarsenide)
69. Simonkolleite (IMA1983-019) 3.DA.20
  (IUPAC: pentazinc octahydroxide dichloride monohydrate)
70. Simplotite (Y: 1956) 4.HG.20
  (IUPAC: calcium nonaoxotetravanadate(IV) pentahydrate)
71. Simpsonite (Y: 1938) 4.DC.10
  (IUPAC: tetraluminium tritantalum hydro tridecaoxide)
72. Sincosite (Y: 1922) 8.CJ.65
  (IUPAC: calcium di(oxovanadate) diphosphate tetrahydrate)
73. Sinhalite (olivine: 1952) 6.AC.05
  (IUPAC: magnesium aluminium tetraoxoborate)
74. Sinjarite (IMA1979-041) 3.BB.25
  (IUPAC: calcium dichloride dihydrate)
75. Sinkankasite (IMA1982-078) 8.DB.20
  (IUPAC: dimanganese aluminium hydroxide di(hydrogenphosphate) hexahydrate)
76. Sinnerite (IMA1964-020) 2.GC.10
  (Cu_{6}As_{4}S_{9})
77. Sinoite (IMA1967 s.p., 1964) 1.DB.10
  (IUPAC: disilicon oxydinitride)
78. Sitinakite (IMA1989-051) 9.AG.30
  (IUPAC: potassium disodium tetratitanium hydroxytridecaoxodisilicate tetrahydrate)
79. Siudaite (IMA2017-092) 9.0 [no] [no]
80. Siwaqaite (ettringite: IMA2018-150) 7.0 [no] [no]
81. Skaergaardite (alloy: IMA2003-049) 1.AG.45 [no]
  (IUPAC: palladium copper alloy)
82. Skinnerite (IMA1973-035) 2.GA.20
  (IUPAC: tricopper antimony trisulfide)
83. Skippenite (tetradymite: IMA1986-033) 2.DC.05
  (IUPAC: dibismuth diselenide telluride)
84. Sklodowskite (Y: 1924) 9.AK.10
  (IUPAC: magnesium diuranyl di(hydroxytrioxosilicate) hexahydrate)
85. Skorpionite (IMA2005-010) 8.DO.45
  (IUPAC: tricalcium dizinc dihydro diphosphate carbonate monohydrate)
86. Skutterudite (skutterudite: 1827) 2.EC.05
  (IUPAC: cobalt triarsenide)
87. Slavíkite (IMA2008 s.p., 1882 Rd) 7.DF.30
88. Slavkovite (IMA2004-038) 8.0
  (IUPAC: tridecacopper hexarsenate tetrahydroxoarsenate tricosahydrate)
89. Slawsonite (IMA1967-026) 9.FA.50
  (IUPAC: strontium dialuminoctaoxodisilicate)
90. Šlikite (IMA2018-120) 5.0 [no] [no]
  (IUPAC: dizinc magnesium dihydro dicarbonate tetrahydrate)
91. Sluzhenikinite (IMA2020-089) 2.0 [no] [no]
92. Slyudyankaite (sodalite: IMA2021-062a) 9.FB. [no] [no]
93. Smamite (IMA2019-001) 8.0 [no] [no]
94. Smirnite (tellurite: IMA1982-104) 4.JK.40
  (IUPAC: dibismuth(III) pentaoxotellurate(IV))
95. Smirnovskite^{Q} (Y: 1957) 8.CJ.45 [no] [no]
  Note: possibly brockite.
96. Smithite (Y: 1905) 2.GC.30
  (IUPAC: silver arsenic disulfide)
97. Smithsonite (calcite: 1780) 5.AB.05
  (IUPAC: zinc carbonate)
98. Smolyaninovite (Y: 1956) 8.CH.55
  (IUPAC: tricobalt diiron(III) tetrarsenate undecahydrate)
99. Smrkovecite (atelestite: IMA1993-040) 8.BO.15
  (IUPAC: dibismuth oxide hydroxide phosphate)
100. Smythite (Y: 1956) 2.CC.10
  ((Fe,Ni)_{(3+x)}S_{4} (x ≈ 0-0.3))
101. Sobolevite (seidozerite, murmanite: IMA1982-042) 9.BE.37
102. Sobolevskite (nickeline: IMA1973-042) 2.CC.05
  (IUPAC: palladium bismuthide)
103. Sodalite (sodalite: 1812) 9.FB.10
  (IUPAC: tetrasodium (trialuminotrisilicate) dodecaoxy chlorine)
104. Soddyite (Y: 1922) 9.AK.05
  (IUPAC: diuranyl tetraoxosilicate dihydrate)
105. Sofiite (selenite: IMA1987-028) 4.JG.15
  (IUPAC: dizinc dichloro selenite)
106. Sogdianite (milarite: IMA1971 s.p., 1968) 9.CM.05
  (IUPAC: potassium dizirconium trilithium triacontaoxydodecasilicate)
107. Söhngeite (söhngeite: IMA1965-022) 4.FC.05
  (IUPAC: gallium trihydroxide)
108. Sokolovaite (mica: IMA2004-012) 9.EC.20 [no]
  (IUPAC: caesium dilithium aluminodecaoxytetrasilicate difluorine)
109. Solongoite (IMA1973-017) 6.CA.40
  (IUPAC: dicalcium trihydrogen chloro tetraoxytriborate hydroxide)
110. Somersetite (IMA2017-024) 5.0 [no] [no]
  (IUPAC: octalead dioxo dihydro pentacarbonate)
111. Sonolite (humite: IMA1967 s.p., 1963) 9.AF.55
  (IUPAC: nonamanganese(II) tetra(tetraoxosilicate) dihydroxide)
112. Sonoraite (tellurite: IMA1968-001) 4.JN.05
  (IUPAC: iron(III) hydroxide tellurite monohydrate)
113. Sopcheite (IMA1980-101) 2.BC.55
  (IUPAC: tetrasilver tripalladium tetratelluride)
114. Sorbyite (madocite: IMA1966-032) 2.LB.30
  (Pb_{9}Cu(Sb,As)_{11}S_{26})
115. Sørensenite (IMA1965-006) 9.DG.30
  (IUPAC: tetrasodium diberyllium tin di(nonaoxotrisilicate) dihydrate)
116. Sorosite (tin alloy: IMA1994-047) 1.AC.15
  (Cu_{(1+x)}(Sn, Sb))
117. Sosedkoite (IMA1981-014) 4.DM.05
  (IUPAC: pentapotassium dialuminium docosatantalum hexacontaoxide)
118. Součekite (IMA1976-017) 2.GA.50
  (IUPAC: copper lead bismuth tri(sulfide, selenide))
119. Souzalite (Y: 1948) 8.DC.45
  (IUPAC: trimagnesium tetraaluminium hexahydroxide tetraphosphate dihydrate)
120. Spadaite^{Q} (saponite, smectite: 1863) 9.EC.45
121. Spaltiite (IMA2014-012) 2.0 [no] [no]
  (IUPAC: dithallium dicopper pentasulfa diarsenide)
122. Spangolite (Y: 1890) 7.DD.15
  (IUPAC: hexacopper aluminium dodecahydro chloro sulfate trihydrate)
123. Spencerite (Y: 1916) 8.DA.40
  (IUPAC: tetrazinc dihydro diphosphate trihydrate)
124. Sperrylite (pyrite: 1889) 2.EB.05a
  (IUPAC: platinum diarsenide)
125. Spertiniite (hydroxide: IMA1980-033) 4.FD.05
  (IUPAC: copper(II) hydroxide)
126. Spessartine (garnet, garnet: 1832) 9.AD.25
  (IUPAC: trimanganese(II) dialuminium tri(tetraoxysilicate))
127. Sphaerobertrandite (IMA2003 s.p., 1957 Rd) 9.AE.50 [no]
  (IUPAC: triberyllium tetraoxosilicate dihydroxyl)
128. Sphaerobismoite (IMA1993-009) 4.CB.65
  (IUPAC: dibismuth trioxide)
129. Sphalerite (sphalerite: IMA1980 s.p., 1847) 2.CB.05a
  (IUPAC: zinc sulfide)
130. Spheniscidite (IMA1977-029) 8.DH.10
  (IUPAC: ammonium diiron(III) hydro diphosphate dihydrate)
131. Spherocobaltite (IMA1962 s.p., 1877 Rd) 5.AB.05
  (IUPAC: cobalt(II) carbonate)
132. Spinel (spinel, spinel: 1546?/ 1797) 4.BB.05
  (IUPAC: magnesium dialuminium tetraoxide)
133. Spionkopite (IMA1978-023) 2.CA.05c
  (Cu_{39}S_{28})
134. Spiridonovite (IMA2018-136) 2.0 [no] [no]
135. Spiroffite (IMA1967 s.p., 1962) 4.JK.10
  (IUPAC: dimanganese(II) octaoxotritellurite)
136. Spodumene (pyroxene: IMA1962 s.p., 1800) 9.DA.30
  (IUPAC: lithium aluminium hexaoxodisilicate)
137. Spriggite (IMA2002-014) 4.GC.15 [no]
  (IUPAC: trilead hexauranyl dihydro octaoxide trihydrate)
138. Springcreekite (alunite, crandallite: IMA1998-048) 8.BL.10 [no]
  (IUPAC: barium trivanadium(III) phosphate hexahydro hydroxophosphate)
139. Spryite (argyrodite: IMA2015-116) 2.0 [no] [no]
  (Ag_{8}((As^{3+})_{0.5}(As^{5+})_{0.5})S_{6})
140. Spurrite (spurrite-afwillite: 1908) 9.AH.15
  (IUPAC: pentacalcium di(tetraoxosilicate) carbonate)
141. Srebrodolskite (brownmillerite: IMA1984-050) .AC.10
  (IUPAC: dicalcium diiron(III) pentaoxide)
142. Šreinite (IMA2004-022) 8.ED.10 [no]
  (IUPAC: lead tetrauranyl tri(bismuth oxide) heptahydro diphosphate tetrahydrate)
143. Srilankite (columbite: IMA1982-056) 4.DB.25
  (IUPAC: dititanium zirconium hexaoxide)

=== St – Sz ===
1. Stalderite (routhierite: IMA1987-024) 2.GA.40
2. Staněkite (wagnerite: IMA1994-045) 8.BB.15
  (IUPAC: iron(III) manganese(II) oxyphosphate)
3. Stanfieldite (IMA1966-045) 8.AC.70
  (IUPAC: tetracalcium pentamagnesium hexaphosphate)
4. Stangersite (IMA2019-092) 2.0 [no] [no]
  (IUPAC: tin germanium trisulfide)
5. Stanleyite (IMA1980-042) 7.DE.50
  (IUPAC: vanadium(IV) oxosulfate hexahydrate)
6. Stannite (stannite: 1832) 2.CB.15a
  (IUPAC: dicopper iron tetrasulfa stannide)
7. Stannoidite (IMA1968-004a) 2.CB.15c
  (Cu_{8}(Fe,Zn)_{3}Sn_{2}S_{12})
8. Stannopalladinite (tin alloy: 1947) 1.AG.25
  (IUPAC: tri(palladium, copper) distannide)
9. Starkeyite (starkeyite: 1945) 7.CB.15
  (IUPAC: magnesium sulfate tetrahydrate)
10. Staročeskéite (lillianite: IMA2016-101) 2.0 [no] [no]
11. Starovaite (IMA2011-085) 8.0 [no]
  (IUPAC: potassium pentacopper oxytrivanadate)
12. Staurolite (Y: 1792) 9.AF.30
  (IUPAC: diiron(II) nonaluminium tetrasilicate heptaoxy hydroxyl)
13. Stavelotite-(La) (IMA2004-014) 9.BE.87
14. Steacyite (steacyite: IMA1981-E) 9.CH.10
15. Steedeite (IMA2013-052) 9.0 [no]
  (NaMn_{2}[Si_{3}BO_{9}](OH)_{2})
16. Steenstrupine-(Ce) (IMA1987 s.p., 1882) 9.CK.20
17. Stefanweissite (IMA2018-020) 4.0 [no] [no]
18. Steigerite (Y: 1935) 8.CE.65
  (IUPAC: aluminium vanadate trihydrate)
19. Steinhardtite (iron: IMA2014-036) 1.0 [no] [no]
  (IUPAC: aluminium)
20. Steinmetzite (IMA2015-081) 8.0 [no] [no]
21. Steklite (sabieite: IMA2011-041) 7.0 [no]
  (IUPAC: potassium aluminium disulfate)
22. Stellerite (zeolitic tectosilicate: IMA1997 s.p., 1909) 9.GE.15
23. Stenhuggarite (IMA1966-037) 4.JB.35
  (IUPAC: calcium iron antimony oxide di(arsenic trioxide))
24. Stenonite (IMA1967 s.p., 1962) 3.CG.05
25. Stepanovite (oxalate: IMA1967 s.p., 1953) 10.AB.20
26. Stephanite (Y: 1845) 2.GB.10
  (IUPAC: pentasilver tetrasulfa antimonide)
27. Štĕpite (IMA2012-006) 8.0 [no] [no]
  (IUPAC: uranium(IV) di(hydroxoarsenate) tetrahydrate)
28. Stercorite (Y: 1850) 8.CJ.05
  (IUPAC: sodium ammonium hydroxyphosphate tetrahydrate)
29. Sterlinghillite (IMA1980-007) 8.CD.25
  (IUPAC: trimanganese(II) diarsenate tetrahydrate)
30. Sternbergite (cubanite: 1827) 2.CB.65
  (IUPAC: silver diiron trisulfide)
31. Steropesite (IMA2008-014) 3.CK.05 [no]
  (IUPAC: trithallium bismuth hexachloride)
32. Sterryite (madocite: IMA1966-020) 2.LB.30
  (Cu(Ag,Cu)_{3}Pb_{19}(Sb,As)_{22}(As)_{2}S_{56})
33. Stetefeldtite^{Q} (pyrochlore: IMA2013 s.p., IMA2010 s.p., 1867) 4.DH.20
  Note: probably argentoroméite.
34. Stetindite-(Ce) (zircon: IMA2008-035) 9.AD.30 [no] [no]
35. Steudelite (cancrinite: IMA2021-007) 9.FB. [no] [no]
36. Stevensite^{Q} (saponite, smectite: 1873) 9.EC.45
37. Steverustite (thiosulfate: IMA2008-021) 7.JA.10 [no]
38. Stewartite (stewartite, laueite: 1910) 8.DC.30
  (IUPAC: manganese(II) diiron(III) dihydro diphosphate octahydrate)
39. Stibarsen (arsenic: IMA1982 s.p., 1941) 1.CA.05
  (IUPAC: arsenic antimony alloy)
40. Stibiconite^{Q} (pyrochlore: IMA2013 s.p., IMA2010 s.p., 1837) 4.DH.20
  Note: might be a variety of roméite group.
41. Stibioclaudetite (claudetite: IMA2007-028) 4.CB.45 [no]
  (IUPAC: arsenic antimony trioxide)
42. Stibiocolumbite (cervantite: 1915) 4.DE.30
  (IUPAC: antimony niobium tetraoxide)
43. Stibiocolusite (germanite: IMA1991-043) 2.CB.30
  (Cu_{13}V(Sb,Sn,As)_{3}S_{16})
44. Stibiogoldfieldite (tetrahedrite: IMA2020-104) 2.GB. [no] [no]
  (IUPAC: hexacopper hexacopper (diantimonide ditelluride) tridecasulfide)
45. Stibiopalladinite (IMA1980 s.p., 1927) 2.AC.20a
  (IUPAC: pentapalladium diantimonide)
46. Stibiotantalite (cervantite: 1893) 4.DE.30
  (IUPAC: antimony(III) tantalum tetraoxide)
47. Stibioústalečite (IMA2021-071) 2.GB. [no] [no]
48. Stibivanite (IMA1980-020) 4.JA.55
  (IUPAC: diantimony(III) vanadium(IV) pentaoxide)
49. Stibnite (stibnite: 1832) 2.DB.05
  (IUPAC: diantimony trisulfide)
50. Stichtite (hydrotalcite: 1910 Rd) 5.DA.50
  (IUPAC: hexamagnesium dichromium hexadecahydro carbonate tetrahydrate)
51. Stilbite (zeolitic tectosilicate) 9.GE.10
  1. Stilbite-Ca (IMA1997 s.p., 1801) 9.GE.10
  2. Stilbite-Na (IMA1997 s.p., 1997) 9.GE.10 [no]
52. Stilleite (sphalerite: 1956) 2.CB.05a
  (IUPAC: zinc selenide)
53. Stillwaterite (stillwaterite: IMA1974-029) 2.AC.10a
  (IUPAC: octapalladium triarsenide)
54. Stillwellite-(Ce) (IMA1987 s.p., 1955) 9.AJ.25
  (IUPAC: cerium borosilicate pentaoxy)
55. Stilpnomelane (smectite: IMA1971 s.p., 1827) 9.EG.40
56. Stishovite (IMA1967 s.p., 1962) 4.DA.40
  (IUPAC: silicon dioxide)
57. Stistaite (metalloid alloy: IMA1969-039) 2.AA.45
  (IUPAC: tin antimonide)
58. Stöfflerite (lingunite: IMA2017-062) 9.F?. [no] [no]
  (IUPAC: calcium dialumodisilicate octaoxy)
59. Stoiberite (IMA1979-016) 8.BB.75
  (IUPAC: pentacopper dioxo divanadate)
60. Stokesite (Y: 1900) 9.DM.05
  (IUPAC: calcium stannotrisilicate nonaoxy dihydrate)
61. Stolperite (alloy: IMA2016-033) 1.0 [no] [no]
  (IUPAC: aluminium copper alloy)
62. Stolzite (scheelite: 1845) 7.GA.05
  (IUPAC: lead tungstate)
63. Stoppaniite (beryl: IMA1996-008) 9.CJ.05 [no]
  (IUPAC: diiron(III) triberylohexasilicate octadecaoxy monohydrate)
64. Stornesite-(Y) (fillowite: IMA2005-040) 8.AC.50 [no]
65. Stottite (stottite: 1958) 4.FC.15
  (IUPAC: iron(II) germanium(IV) hexahydroxide)
66. Straβmannite (leydetite: IMA2017-086) 9.0 [no] [no]
  (IUPAC: aluminium uranyl di(tetraoxy silicate) fluoride hexadecahydrate)
67. Stracherite (zadovite, arctite: IMA2016-098) 9.A?. [no] [no]
  (IUPAC: barium hexacalcium di(tetraoxy silicate) di(phosphate carbonate) fluoride)
68. Straczekite (straczekite: IMA1983-028) 4.HE.20
69. Strakhovite (IMA1993-005) 9.CF.20 [no]
70. Stranskiite (IMA1962 s.p.) 8.AB.35
  (IUPAC: copper dizinc diarsenate)
71. Strashimirite (IMA1967-025) 8.DC.12
  (IUPAC: octacopper tetrahydro tetrarsenate pentahydrate) (Sejkora et al., 2015)
72. Strätlingite (IMA1975-031) 9.EG.25
73. Strelkinite (IMA1973-063) 4.HB.30
  (IUPAC: disodium diuranyl divanadate hexahydrate)
74. Strengite (Y: 1877) 8.CD.10
  (IUPAC: iron(III) phosphate dihydrate)
75. Stringhamite (IMA1974-007) 9.AE.35
  (IUPAC: calcium copper (tetraoxy silicate) monohydrate)
76. Stromeyerite (Y: 1832) 2.BA.40
  (IUPAC: copper silver sulfide)
77. Stronadelphite (apatite: IMA2008-009) 8.BN.05 [no] [no]
  (IUPAC: pentastrontium fluoro triphosphate)
78. Stronalsite IMA(1983-016) 9.FA.60
  (IUPAC: disodium strontium tetraluminotetrasilicate hexadecaoxy)
79. Strontianite (aragonite: 1791) 5.AB.15
  (IUPAC: strontium carbonate)
80. Strontiochevkinite^{Q} (chevkinite: IMA1983-009) 9.BE.70
  (Note: it might be Fe-bearing rengeite)
81. Strontiodresserite (dundasite: IMA1977-005) 5.DB.10
  (IUPAC: strontium dialuminium tetrahydro dicarbonate monohydrate)
82. Strontiofluorite (fluorite: IMA2009-014) 3.AB.25 [no]
  (IUPAC: strontium difluoride)
83. Strontioginorite (Y: 1960) 6.FC.15
  (IUPAC: calcium strontium hexahydro icosaoxo tetradecaborate pentahydrate)
84. Strontiohurlbutite (danburite: IMA2012-032) 8.AA.15 (9 ed) [no] [no]
  (IUPAC: strontium diberyllium diphosphate)
85. Strontiojoaquinite (joaquinite: IMA1979-080 Rd) 9.CE.25
86. Strontiomelane (hollandite, coronadite: IMA1995-005) 4.DK.05a
  (IUPAC: strontium (hexamanganese(IV) dimanganese(III)) hexadecaoxide)
87. Strontio-orthojoaquinite (joaquinite: IMA2000-D, IMA1979-081a Rd) 9.CE.25
  (IUPAC: sodium tetrastrontium iron(III) dititanium octasilicate tetraicosaoxy tetrahydroxyl)
88. Strontioperloffite (bjarebyite: IMA2015-023) 8.0 [no] [no]
  (IUPAC: strontium dimanganese(II) diiron(III) trihydro triphosphate)
89. Strontiopharmacosiderite (pharmacosiderite: IMA2013-101) 8.DK. [no] [no]
  (IUPAC: strontium octairon (octahydro hexarsenate) octahydrate)
90. Strontioruizite (ruizite: IMA2017-045) 9.B?. [no] [no]
  (IUPAC: distrontium dimanganese(III) tetrasilicate undecaoxy tetrahydroxyl dihydrate)
91. Strontiowhitlockite (whitlockite: IMA1989-040) 8.AC.45
  (IUPAC: nonastrontium magnesium hexaphosphate hydroxophosphate)
92. Strunzite (strunzite: 1958) 8.DC.25
  (IUPAC: manganese(II) diiron(III) dihydro diphosphate hexahydrate)
93. Struvite (struvite) 8.CH.40
  1. Struvite (1847) 8.CH.40
    (IUPAC: ammonium magnesium phosphate hexahydrate)
  2. Struvite-K (IMA2003-048) 8.CH.40
    (IUPAC: potassium magnesium phosphate hexahydrate)
94. Studenitsite (IMA1994-026) 6.GB.05
95. Studtite (Y: 1947) 4.GA.15
  (IUPAC: (uranyl dioxide diwater) dihydrate)
96. Stumpflite (nickeline: IMA1972-013) 2.CC.05
  (IUPAC: platinum antimonide)
97. Sturmanite (ettringite: IMA1981-011) 7.DG.15
98. Stützite (IMA1964 s.p., 1878 Rd) 2.BA.65
  (Ag_{(5–x)}Te_{3} (x = 0.24-0.36))
99. Suanite (IMA1967 s.p., 1953) 6.BA.05
  (IUPAC: dimagnesium pentaoxo diborate)
100. Sudburyite (nickeline: IMA1973-048) 2.CC.05
  (IUPAC: palladium antimonide)
101. Sudoite (chlorite: IMA1966-027 Rd) 9.EC.55
  (IUPAC: di magnesium trialuminium alumotrisilicate decaoxy octahydroxyl)
102. Sudovikovite (IMA1995-009) 2.EA.20 [no]
  (IUPAC: platinum diselenide)
103. Suenoite (Mg-Fe-Mn amphibole: IMA2019-075) 9.D [no] [no]
104. Suessite (silicide: IMA1979-056) 1.BB.05
  (IUPAC: triiron silicide)
105. Sugakiite (pentlandite: IMA2005-033) 2.BB.15
  (Cu(Fe,Ni)_{8}S_{8})
106. Sugilite (milarite: IMA1974-060) 9.CM.05
  (IUPAC: potassium disodium diiron(III) trilithiododecasilicate triacontaoxy)
107. Suhailite (mica: IMA2007-040) 9.EC.20 [no]
  (IUPAC: ammonium triiron(II) (alumotrisilicate) decaoxy dihydroxyl)
108. Sulfatoredmondite (IMA2021-089) 7.JA. [no] [no]
109. Sulfhydrylbystrite (cancrinite: IMA2015-010) 9.F?. [no] [no]
110. Sulfoborite (Y: 1893) 6.AC.55
111. Sulphohalite (double antiperovskite: 1888) 7.BD.05
  (IUPAC: hexasodium chloro fluoro disulfate)
112. Sulphotsumoite (tetradymite: IMA1980-084) 2.DC.05
  (IUPAC: tribismuth ditelluride sulfide)
113. Sulphur (element: old) 1.CC.05
  (IUPAC: octasulfur rings, α-sulphur)
  (Note: sulfur per Wikipedia convention but the IMA names the native mineral sulphur)
  1. Sulphur-β (Y: 1912)
    (IUPAC: octasulfur rings, β-sulfur)
114. Sulvanite (Y: 1900) 2.CB.70
  (IUPAC: tricopper vanadium tetrasulfide)
115. Sundiusite (IMA1979-044) 7.BD.70
  (IUPAC: decalead octaoxo dichloro sulfate)
116. Suolunite (IMA1968 s.p., 1965) 9.BE.10
  (IUPAC: dicalcium disilicate pentaoxy dihydroxyl monohydrate)
117. Suredaite (IMA1997-043) 2.DB.10 [no]
  (IUPAC: lead antimonide trisulfide)
118. Surinamite (sapphirine: IMA1974-053) 9.DH.55
  (IUPAC: trimagnesium trialuminium oxy (pentadecaoxy berylloalumotrisilicate))
119. Surite (IMA1977-037) 9.EC.75
120. Sursassite (ardennite: 1926) 9.BG.15
  (IUPAC: dimanganese(II) trialuminium (tetraoxo silicate) (heptaoxy disilicate) trihydroxyl)
121. Susannite (Y: 1845) 5.BF.40
  (IUPAC: tetralead dihydro sulfate dicarbonate)
122. Suseinargiuite (scheelite: IMA2014-089) 7.0 [no] [no]
  (IUPAC: sodium bismuth dimolybdate)
123. Sussexite (Y: 1868) 6.BA.15
  (IUPAC: manganese(II) hydro dioxo borate)
124. Suzukiite (IMA1978-005) 9.DH.15
  (IUPAC: barium vanadium(IV) disilicate heptaoxy)
125. Svabite (apatite: 1892) 8.BN.05
  (IUPAC: pentacalcium fluoro triarsenate)
126. Svanbergite (alunite, beudantite: IMA1987 s.p., 1854 Rd) 8.BL.05
  (IUPAC: strontium trialuminium hexahydro sulfate phosphate)
127. Sveinbergeite (astrophyllite, devitoite: IMA2010-027) 9.DC.05 [no]
128. Sveite (IMA1980-005) 5.ND.20
  (IUPAC: potassium heptaluminium hexadecahydro dichloro tetranitrate octahydrate)
129. Švenekite (IMA1999-007) 8.AD.10 [no]
  (IUPAC: calcium di(dihydroxoarsenate))
130. Sverigeite (IMA1983-066) 9.AE.15
  (IUPAC: sodium diberyllium dimanganese(II) tin trisilicate dodecaoxy hydroxyl)
131. Svornostite (IMA2014-078) 7.0 [no] [no]
  (IUPAC: dipotassium magnesium di[uranyl disulfate] octahydrate)
132. Svyatoslavite (IMA1988-012) 9.FA.45
  (IUPAC: calcium (octaoxy dialumodisilicate))
133. Svyazhinite (IMA1983-045) 7.DB.05
  (IUPAC: magnesium aluminium fluoro disulfate tetradecahydrate)
134. Swaknoite (IMA1991-021) 8.CJ.10
  (IUPAC: diammonium calcium di(hydroxophosphate) monohydrate)
135. Swamboite-Nd (IMA2017-A, IMA1981-008) 9.AK.20
  (IUPAC: niobium tri[uranyl silicate trioxy hydroxyl] (c. 7.5)hydrate)
136. Swartzite (Y: 1951) 5.ED.10
  (IUPAC: calcium magnesium uranyl tricarbonate dodecahydrate)
137. Swedenborgite (Y: 1924) 4.AC.05
  (IUPAC: sodium tetraberyllium antimony(V) heptaoxide)
138. Sweetite (IMA1983-011) 4.FA.10
  (IUPAC: zinc dihydroxide)
139. Swinefordite (montmorillonite, smectite: IMA1973-054) 9.EC.45
140. Switzerite (IMA1966-042 Rd) 8.CE.25
  (IUPAC: trimanganese(II) diphosphate heptahydrate)
141. Sylvanite (calaverite: 1832) 2.EA.05
  (IUPAC: silver gold tetratelluride)
142. Sylvite (halite, rocksalt: 1823) 3.AA.20
  (IUPAC: potassium chloride)
143. Symesite (IMA1998-035) 3.DC.60
  (IUPAC: decalead heptaoxo tetrachloro sulfate monohydrate)
144. Symplesite (symplesite: 1837) 8.CE.45
  (IUPAC: triiron(II) diarsenate octahydrate)
145. Synadelphite (Y: 1884) 8.BE.50
  (IUPAC: nonamanganese(II) nonahydro diarsenate arsenate(III) dihydrate)
146. Synchysite (synchysite) 5.BD.20c
  (IUPAC: calcium REE fluoro dicarbonate)
  1. Synchysite-(Ce) (IMA1982-030) 5.BD.20c
  2. Synchysite-(Nd) (IMA1982-030a) 5.BD.20c
  3. Synchysite-(Y) (IMA1982-030b, 1955) 5.BD.20c
147. Syngenite (Y: 1872) 7.CD.35
  (IUPAC: dipotassium calcium disulfate monohydrate)
148. Szaibélyite (Y: 1862) 6.BA.15
  (IUPAC: magnesium hydro dioxo borate)
149. Szenicsite (IMA1993-011) 7.GB.10
  (IUPAC: tricopper tetrahydro molybdate)
150. Szklaryite (dumortierite: IMA2012-070) 4.0 [no] [no]
  (IUPAC: vacancy hexaluminium boron triarsenic(III) pentadecaoxide)
151. Szmikite (kieserite: 1877) 7.CB.05
  (IUPAC: manganese(II) sulfate monohydrate)
152. Szomolnokite (kieserite: 1891) 7.CB.05
  (IUPAC: iron(II) sulfate monohydrate)
153. Sztrokayite^{N} (Y: 1987) 2.DC.05 [no]
  (IUPAC: tribismuth telluride disulfide)
154. Szymańskiite (IMA1989-045) 5.DB.30
