= Sursassite =

Sorosilicate mineral

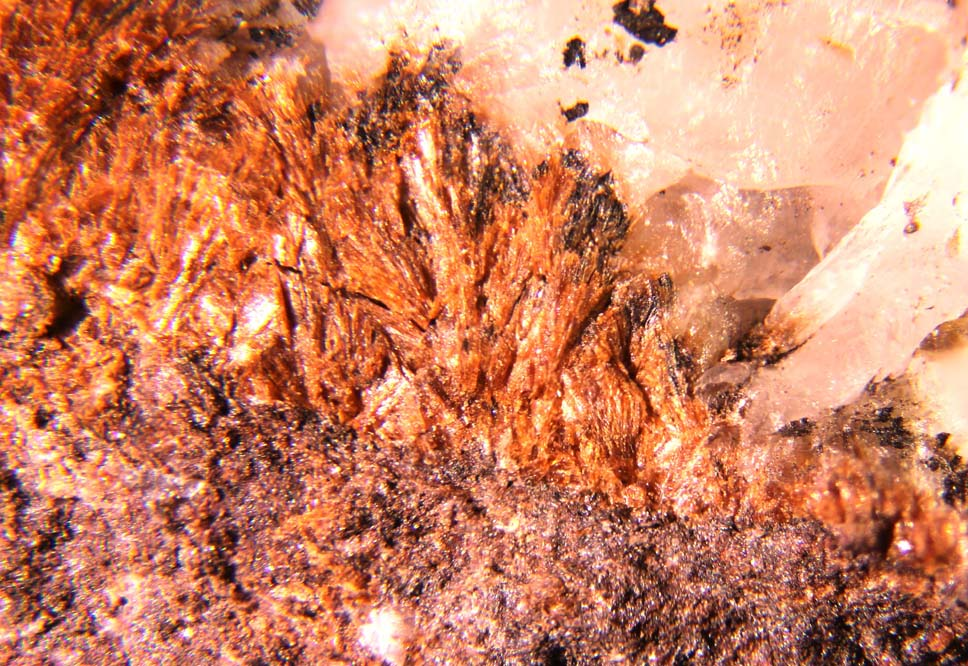

General
- Category: Sorosilicate
- Formula: Mn^{2+}_{2}Al_{3}(SiO_{4})(Si_{2}O_{7})(OH)_{3}
- IMA symbol: Ss
- Strunz classification: 9.BG.15
- Crystal system: Monoclinic
- Crystal class: Prismatic (2/m) (same H-M symbol)
- Space group: P2_{1}/m

Identification
- Color: Red-brown to copper-red
- Crystal habit: Botryoidal
- Cleavage: [101] Distinct
- Mohs scale hardness: 3
- Luster: Silky, Dull
- Streak: yellow-brown
- Diaphaneity: Translucent
- Density: 3.256
- Optical properties: Biaxial
- Refractive index: 1.73 to 1.76
- Birefringence: 0.030
- Pleochroism: Strong; X = Z = colorless to pale yellow; Y = deep golden brown.
- Dispersion: r > v

Sursassite is a sorosilicate mineral. It was first discovered in 1926. It was first found in the Sursass (Oberhalbstein), a district of Graubünden, Switzerland. It is generally found in deposits of metamorphosed manganese.
