= Senegalite =

Mineral

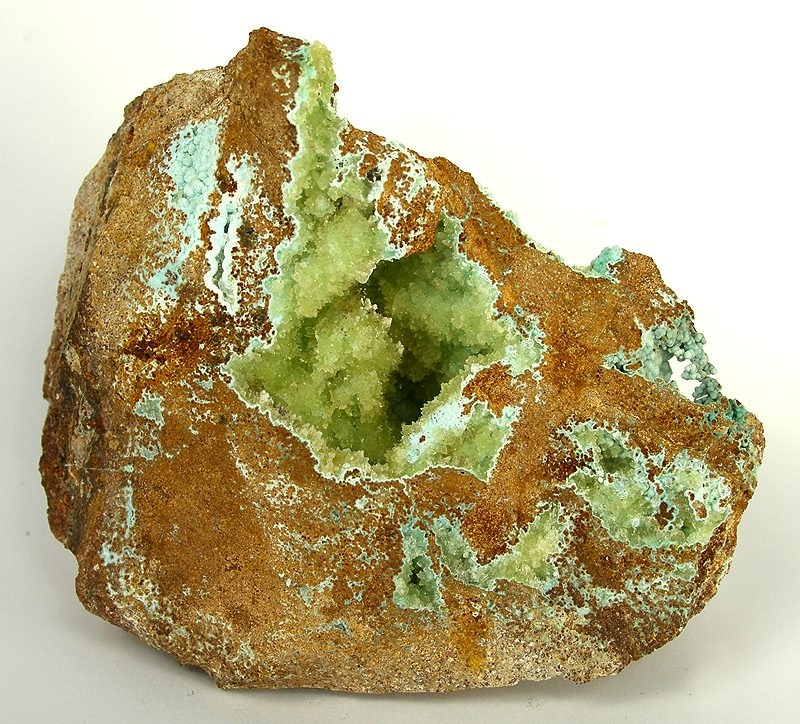

General
- Category: Minerals
- Formula: Al_{2}(PO_{4})(OH)_{3}⋅3H_{2}
- IMA symbol: Sng

Identification
- Color: Colorless, Light yellow

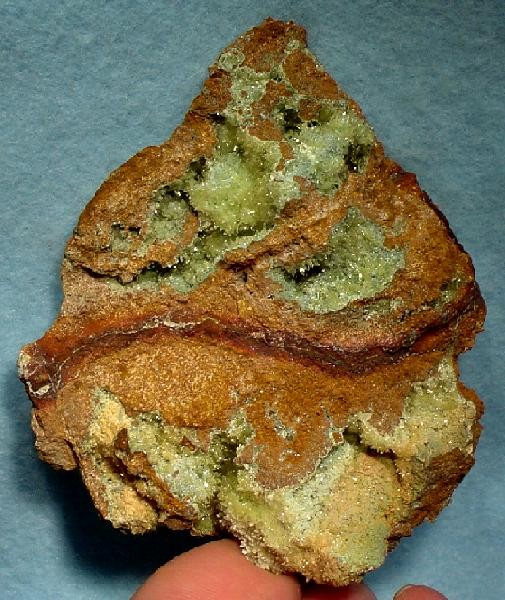
This rare specimen of a rediscovery features large boxwork-like cavities lined with senegalite and various phosphates species in a limonite gossan matrix.

Senegalite is a rare aluminum phosphate. It is a hydrated hydroxy phosphate of aluminum. It is named after Senegal, the country in which it was first found to occur.

The molecular structure of the phosphate mineral senegalite is Al_{2}(PO_{4})(OH)_{3}⋅3H_{2}O.
