= Shumwayite =

Rare but relatively simple uranyl sulfate mineral

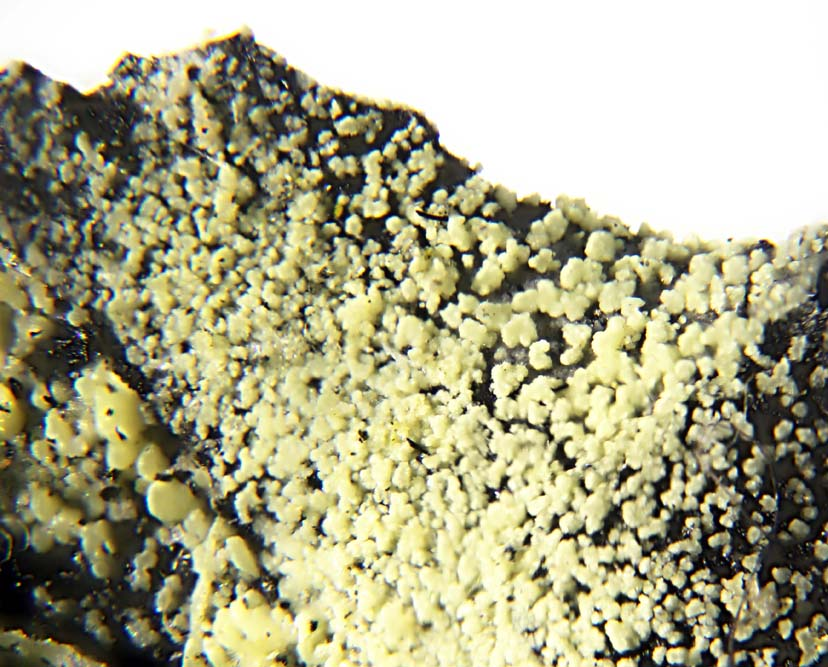
- Yellow green crystals of the rare new uranium mineral shumwayite (IMA 2015-058) on a contrasting black matrix from the type locality in Utah (Giveway-Simplot Mine, Red Canyon, San Juan County, Utah.

General
- Category: Sulfate mineral
- Formula: (UO_{2})_{2}(SO_{4})_{2}•5H_{2}O
- IMA symbol: Smw
- Crystal system: Monoclinic
- Crystal class: Prismatic (2/m) (same H-M symbol)
- Space group: P2_{1}/c
- Unit cell: a = 6.75 Å, b = 12.50 Å c = 16.90 Å, β = 90.92° (approximated)

Identification
- Other characteristics: Radioactive

Shumwayite is a rare but relatively simple uranyl sulfate mineral with the formula (UO_{2})_{2}(SO_{4})_{2}•5H_{2}O. It was discovered in the Green Lizard and Giveaway-Simplot mines of the White Canyon mining district, San Juan County, Utah, US.

== Relation to other minerals ==
The structure of shumwayite is unique. Somewhat chemically similar natural uranyl sulfates include jáchymovite, metauranopilite and uranopilite.
