= Saliotite =

Phyllosilicate mineral in the smectite group

General
- Category: Phyllosilicate minerals
- Group: Smectite group
- Formula: (Li,Na)Al_{3}(AlSi_{3}O_{10})(OH)_{5}
- IMA symbol: Sal
- Strunz classification: 9.EC.60
- Crystal system: Monoclinic
- Crystal class: Prismatic (2/m) (same H-M symbol)
- Space group: C2/m
- Unit cell: a = 5.15 Å, b = 8.91 Å c = 23.83 Å; β = 94.23°; Z = 4

Identification
- Color: Colorless to white
- Cleavage: Perfect on {001}
- Mohs scale hardness: 2 - 3
- Luster: Pearly
- Streak: White
- Diaphaneity: Transparent
- Specific gravity: 2.75
- Optical properties: Biaxial (-)
- Refractive index: n_{α} = 1.580 - 1.590 n_{β} = 1.580 - 1.590 n_{γ} = 1.590 - 1.600
- Birefringence: δ = 0.010
- 2V angle: 30° to 50°

Saliotite is a rare colorless to pearl white phyllosilicate mineral in the smectite group with formula (Li,Na)Al_{3}(AlSi_{3}O_{10})(OH)_{5}. It is an ordered 1:1 interstratification of cookeite and paragonite. It has perfect cleavage, a pearly luster and leaves a white streak. Its crystal structure is monoclinic, and it is a soft mineral with a hardness rated 2-3 on the Mohs scale.

Saliotite was first described in 1994 for an occurrence in an outcrop of high grade schist north of Almeria, Andalusia, Spain. It was named for French geologist Pierre Saliot.
