= Schmiederite =

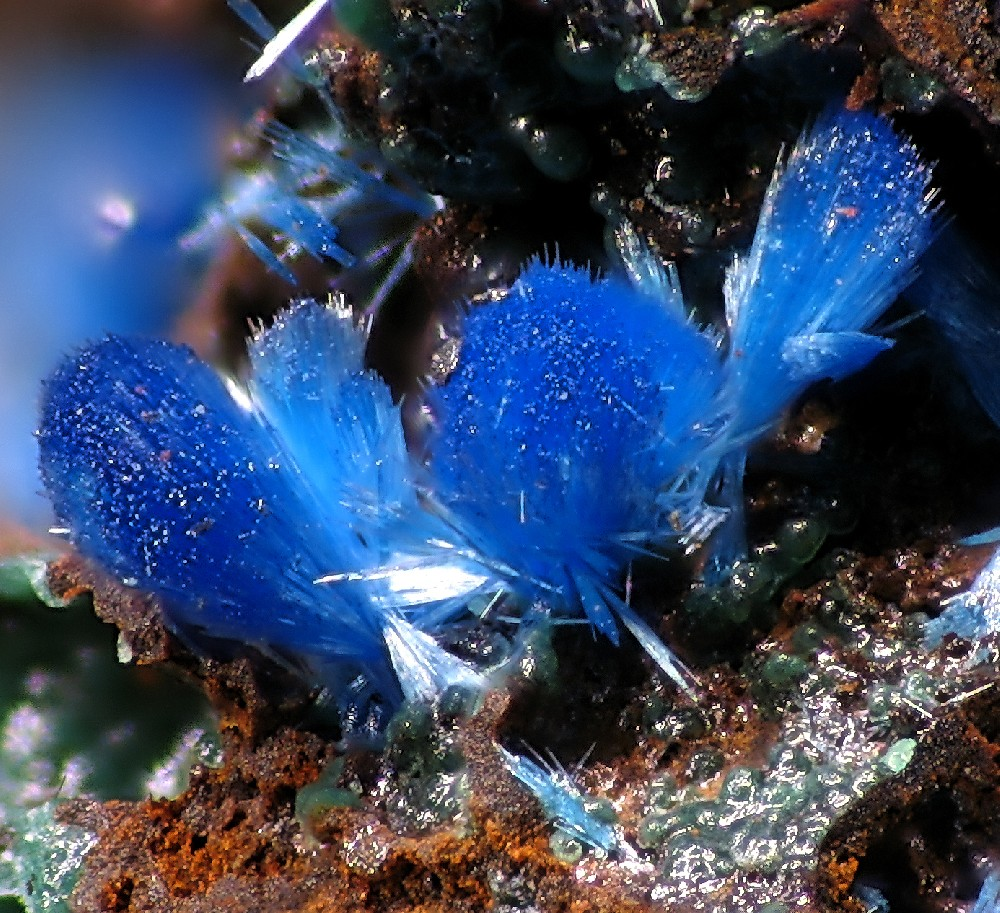

General
- Category: Selenate minerals
- Formula: Pb_{2}Cu_{2}(Se^{4+}O_{3})(Se^{6+}O_{4})(OH)_{4}
- IMA symbol: Scm
- Strunz classification: 7.BC.65
- Crystal system: Monoclinic
- Crystal class: Prismatic (2/m) (same H-M symbol)
- Space group: P2_{1}/m
- Unit cell: a = 9.92 Å, b = 5.71 Å c = 9.36 Å; β = 101.86°; Z = 2

Identification
- Color: Pale to deep Prussian blue
- Crystal habit: Fibrous in radial clusters; may be in crusts; powdery
- Luster: Subadamantine to satiny
- Streak: Light blue
- Diaphaneity: Transparent
- Specific gravity: 5.62
- Optical properties: Biaxial (+)
- Refractive index: n_{α} = 1.85–1.9 n_{β} = 1.9–1.95 n_{γ} = 1.95–2.1

Schmiederite is a secondary mineral in the oxidized zone of selenium-bearing hydrothermal base metal deposits. Its chemical formula is Pb_{2}Cu_{2}(Se^{4+}O_{3})(Se^{6+}O_{4})(OH)_{4}.

It was first described in 1962 for an occurrence in the Cóndor mine, Los Llantenes district, Sierra de Cacheuta, La Rioja Province, Argentina (type locality). It was named for Oscar Schmieder (1891–1980), German geographer.
