= Steinmetzite =

Very rare phosphate mineral

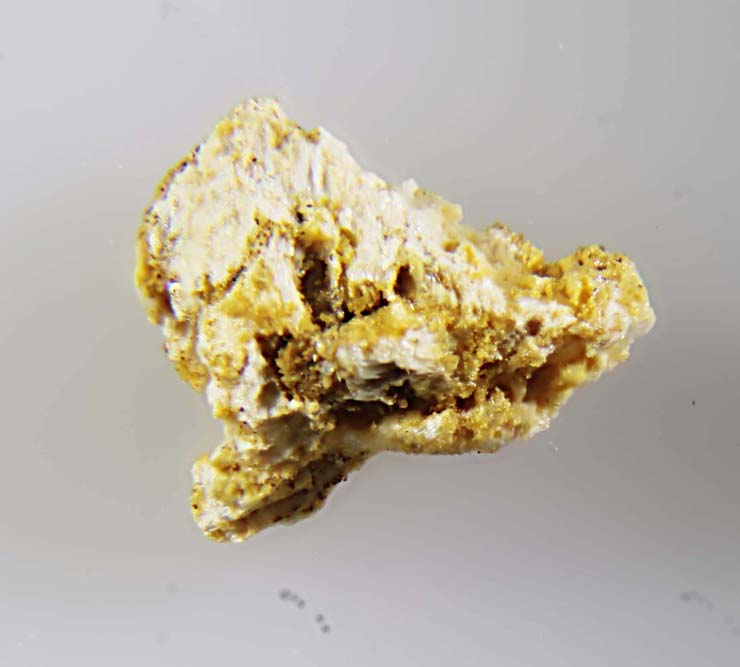

General
- Category: Phosphate mineral
- Formula: Zn_{2}Fe(PO_{4})_{2}(OH)•3H_{2}O
- IMA symbol: Snm
- Crystal system: Triclinic
- Crystal class: Pinacoidal (1̅) (same H-M symbol)
- Space group: P1̅

Identification

Steinmetzite is a very rare phosphate mineral with formula Zn_{2}Fe(PO_{4})_{2}(OH)•3H_{2}O. It was discovered among pegmatites of Hagendorf in Germany, that are famous for rare phosphate minerals. Steinmetzite is chemically related to phosphophyllite and other zinc iron phosphates, namely plimerite and zinclipscombite.
