= Saneroite =

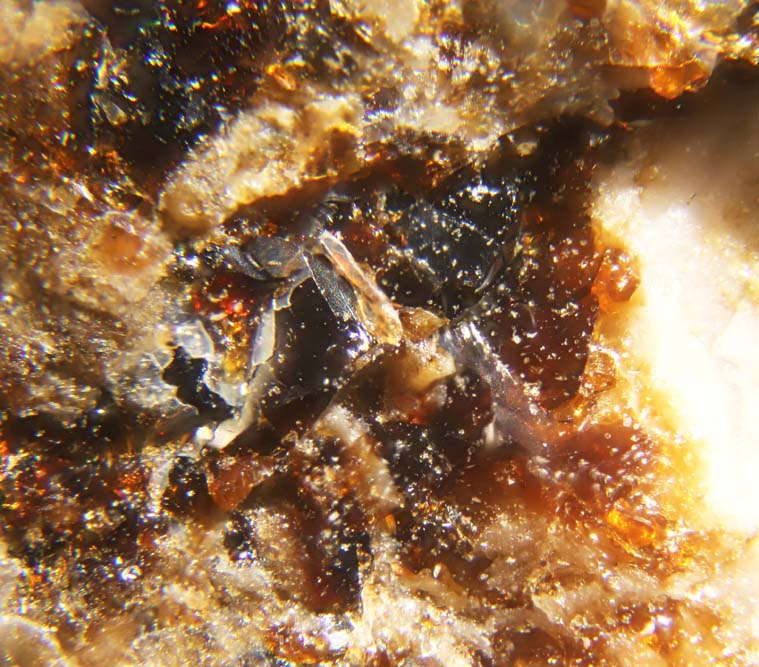
- Brown crystals of the rare vanadium mineral saneroite from the type locality in Valgraveglia mine (Reppia, Ne, Graveglia Valley, Genova Province, Liguria, Italy)

General
- Category: Minerals
- Formula: Na_{2}(Mn,Mn)_{10}Si_{11}VO_{34}(OH)_{4}

Saneroite (Na_{2}(Mn,Mn)_{10}Si_{11}VO_{34}(OH)_{4}) is a silicate mineral found in Italy. It is named after Edoardo Sanero, a professor at the University of Genova. It is a triclinic mineral with space group symmetry P1̅.
