= Minyulite =

Phosphate mineral

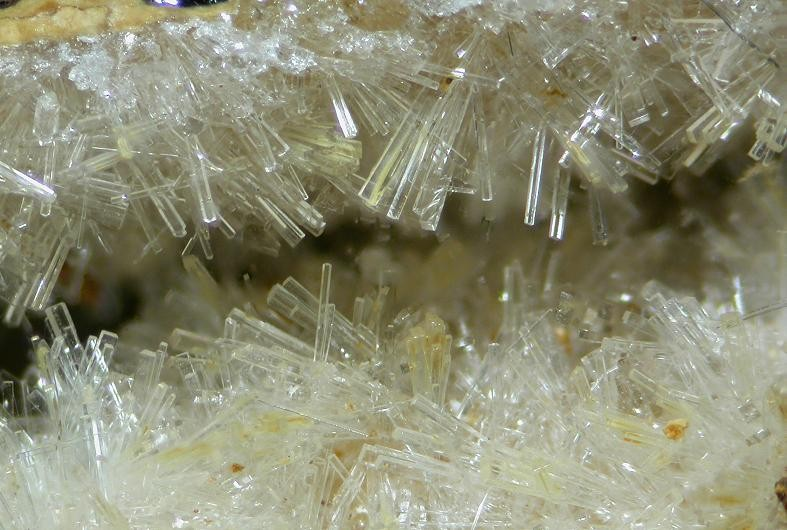
- Colorless minyulite crystals from Tom's Phosphate quarry, Kapunda, Mount Lofty Ranges, South Australia (Field of view 4 mm)

General
- Category: Phosphate mineral
- Formula: KAl_{2}(PO_{4})_{2}F·4(H_{2}O)
- IMA symbol: Myu
- Strunz classification: 8.DH.05
- Crystal system: Orthorhombic
- Crystal class: Pyramidal (mm2) (same H-M symbol)
- Space group: Pba2
- Unit cell: a = 9.34 Å, b = 9.74 Å, c = 5.52 Å; Z = 2

Identification
- Formula mass: 372.57 g/mol
- Color: Colorless to white, greenish yellow
- Crystal habit: Radiating fibrous to prismatic crystals
- Cleavage: {001} Perfect
- Fracture: Uneven - Flat surfaces (not cleavage) fractured in an uneven pattern.
- Tenacity: Brittle
- Mohs scale hardness: 3.5
- Luster: Vitreous, silky in aggregates
- Streak: White
- Diaphaneity: Transparent
- Specific gravity: 2.45
- Optical properties: Biaxial (+)
- Refractive index: n_{α} = 1.531 n_{β} = 1.534 n_{γ} = 1.538
- Birefringence: δ = 0.007
- 2V angle: Measured: 70°, calculated: 82°

Minyulite is a rare phosphate mineral with a chemical formula of KAl_{2}(PO_{4})_{2}F·4(H_{2}O) (redefinition, IMA21-E).

It occurs as groups of radiating fine fibrous crystals within rock cracks of phosphatic ironstone. Minyulite belongs to the orthorhombic crystal system. This indicates that it has three axes of unequal length yet all are perpendicular to each other. Its cell constants are a=9.35, b=9.74 c=5.52.

As for its optical properties, Minyulite is an anisotropic mineral which means the velocity of light differs when traveling through it depending on the cut of its cross-section which gives it more than one refractive index. The mineral is optically biaxial. Its birefringence value is 0.007. It has three refractive indices which are nα=1.531 nβ=1.534 nγ=1.538. Refractive indices are a ratio of the speed of light in a median with respect to the speed of light passing through the mineral.

== Occurrence ==
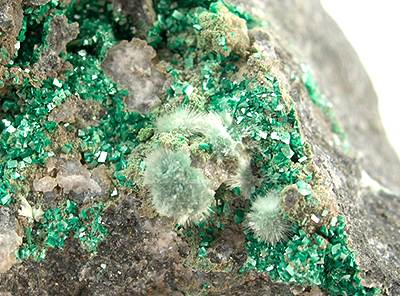
Minyulite (white) and sincosite (green), from Ross Hannibal Mine, Lead District, South Dakota, US (size: 7.1 x 5.4 x 2.7 cm)

It was first described in 1933 for an occurrence in Western Australia and named after the type locality, Minyulo Well in Western Australia.

Minyulite is considered as a secondary phosphate since it is formed by the alteration of a primary phosphate. It occurs in association with dufrenite, apatite, fluellite, wavellite, variscite and leucophosphite.

The mineral can be found in the underlying phosphatized rock zone of ornithogenic soil. Minyulite is not found in abundance, it can be found in the seashore of the maritime Arctic.
