= Atencioite =

Phosphate mineral

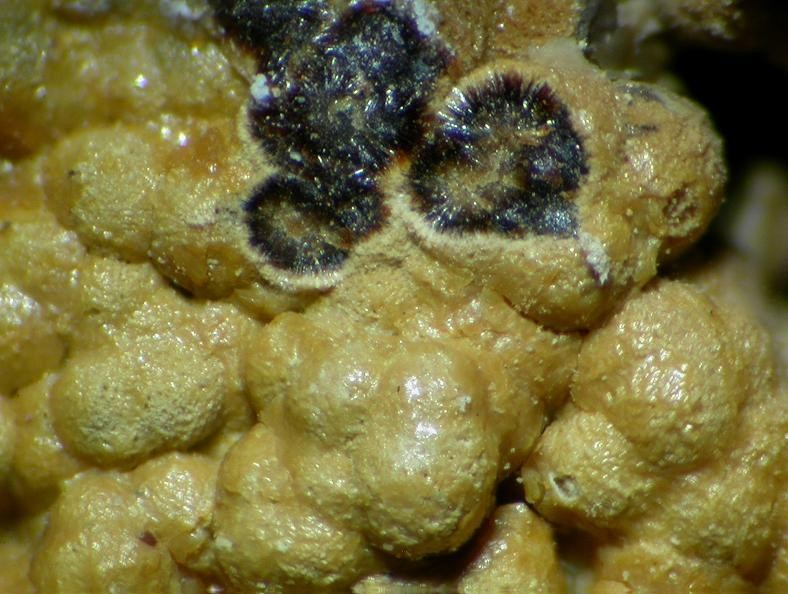
- Atencioite found in Brazil

General
- Category: Minerals
- Formula: Ca_{2}Fe^{2+}_{3}Mg_{2}Be_{4}(PO_{4})_{6}(OH)_{4}·6H_{2}O
- IMA symbol: Aco

Identification
- Color: greenish brown
- Specific gravity: 2.86

Atencioite is a calcium iron phosphate mineral with the chemical formula Ca_{2}Fe^{2+}_{3}Mg_{2}Be_{4}(PO_{4})_{6}(OH)_{4}·6H_{2}O. Its type locality is Divino das Laranjeiras, Minas Gerais, Brazil. It was named after Daniel Atencio, a mineralogy professor at the University of São Paulo.
