= Spheniscidite =

General
- Category: Phosphate mineral
- Formula: (NH_{4},K)(Fe^{3+},Al)_{2}(PO_{4})2(OH)· 2H_{2}O

Identification
- Color: Brown
- Mohs scale hardness: 1-1.5

Spheniscidite is a phosphate mineral. It is the ammonium analogue of leucophosphite.

== See also ==
- Sphenisciformes (penguins), the mineral has been named after this clade
- Elephant Island, type locality
