= Aheylite =

Phosphate mineral

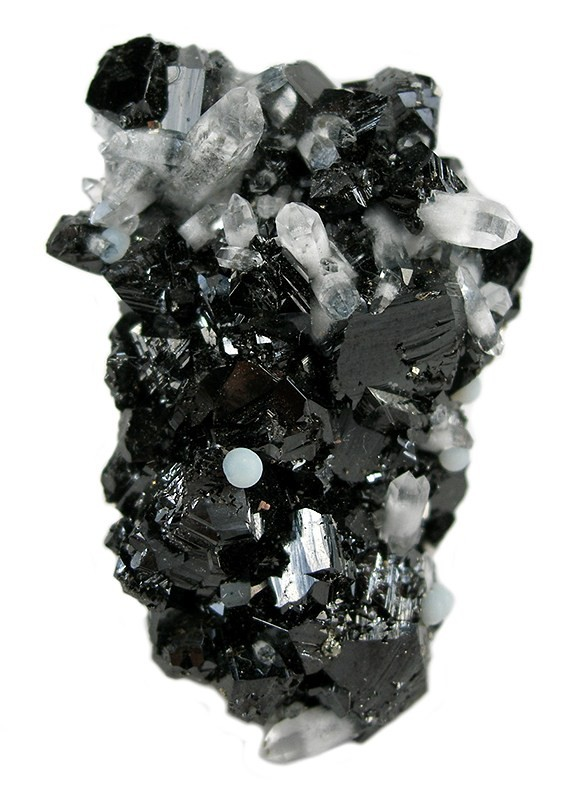
- Size: 3.5 × 2.3 × 0.8 cm. Translucent ~0.2 cm spheres of aheylite are perched on dark cassiterite, together with elongated quartz crystals.

General
- Category: Phosphate minerals
- Formula: (Fe^{2+},Zn)Al_{6}(OH)_{8}(PO_{4})_{4}·4(H_{2}O)
- IMA symbol: Ahe
- Strunz classification: 8.DD.15
- Crystal system: Triclinic; Unknown space group
- Unit cell: a = 7.885, b = 10.199 c = 7.672 [Å]; α = 110.84° β = 115.12°, γ = 67.51°; Z = 1

Identification
- Color: Very pale blue, pale green, to blue-green
- Crystal habit: Interlocked crystals in felted and matted aggregates forming botryoidal, spherulitic masses; radiating, prismatic groups
- Cleavage: Perfect {001}, {010} good
- Fracture: Hackly to splintery
- Tenacity: Brittle
- Mohs scale hardness: 5 to 5.5
- Luster: Porcelaneous to subvitreous
- Streak: White to greenish white
- Diaphaneity: Transparent in thin flakes
- Specific gravity: 2.84
- Optical properties: Biaxial (+)
- Refractive index: ~1.63

Aheylite is a rare phosphate mineral with formula (Fe^{2+}Zn)Al_{6}[(OH)_{4}|(PO_{4})_{2}]_{2}·4(H_{2}O). It occurs as pale blue to pale green triclinic crystal masses. Aheylite was made the newest member of the turquoise group in 1984 by International Mineralogical Association Commission on New Minerals and Mineral Names.

== Composition ==
The turquoise group has a basic formula of A_{0–1}B_{6}(PO_{4})_{4−x}(PO_{3}OH)_{x}(OH)_{8}·4H_{2}O. This group contains five other minerals. In addition to aheylite: planerite, turquoise, faustite, chalcosiderite, and an unnamed Fe^{2+}-Fe^{3+} analogue. Aheylite is distinguished in this group by having Fe^{2+} dominant in the A-site. The ideal aheylite has a formula of Fe^{2+}Al_{6}(PO_{4})_{4}(OH)_{8}·4H_{2}O. Its color is pale blue or green. With turquoise family the blue color is said to come from the octahedral coordination of Cu^{2+} in the absence of Fe^{3+}.

== Name and discovery ==
It was first described for an occurrence in the Huanuni mine, Huanuni, Oruro Department, Bolivia, and named for Allen V. Heyl (1918–2008), an economic geologist for the United States Geological Survey. It was eventually described by Eugene Foord and Joseph Taggart in 1998.

== Occurrence ==
In addition to the type locality in Bolivia it has been reported from the Bali Lo prospect in the Capricorn Range, Western Australia and the Les Montmins Mine, Auvergne, France. It is a turquoise group mineral and occurs as a late hydrothermal phase in a tin deposit associated with variscite, vivianite, wavellite, cassiterite, sphalerite, pyrite and quartz in the type locality.

== Physical properties ==
It is found as an isolated mass of hemispheres and spheres clumped together. It has a vitreous to dull luster. It has a hackly to splintery fracture and it has a brittle tenacity. The hardness is about 5–5.5, and the specific gravity is 2.84. As far as optical properties, it had thin flakes; a pale blue, green to blue-green color; it streaks white, and has a subvitreous luster.
