= Santabarbaraite =

Phosphate mineral

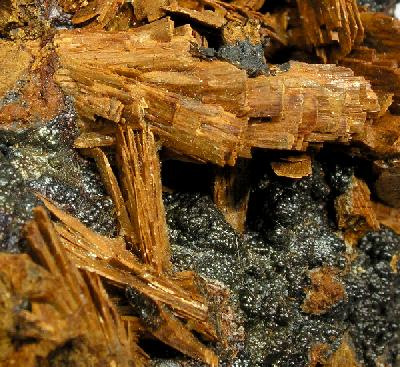
- Santabarbaraite (pseudomorph) after vivianite

General
- Category: Phosphate minerals
- Formula: Fe_{3}^{+3}(PO_{4})_{2}(OH)_{3}·5H_{2}O
- IMA symbol: Sbb
- Strunz classification: 8.CE.80
- Crystal system: Amorphous

Identification
- Color: Brown to light brown
- Crystal habit: Elongated or flattened prisms
- Twinning: None
- Cleavage: None, parting along {010} of replaced phase
- Fracture: Conchoidal
- Mohs scale hardness: Not determined
- Luster: Vitreous to greasy
- Streak: yellow-umber
- Diaphaneity: Translucent
- Specific gravity: 2.24
- Optical properties: isotropic
- Refractive index: n = 1.659
- Other characteristics: Pseudomorphism

Santabarbaraite is an amorphous ferric hydroxy phosphate mineral hydrate that was discovered in Tuscany, Italy during 2000. It also can be found in Victoria, Australia and Lake Baikal, Siberia.

This phosphate mineral has a simplified formula Fe^{3+}_{3}(PO_{4})_{2}(OH)_{3}·5 H_{2}O, which is the same formula of another non-amorphous phosphate mineral called allanpringite. Santabarbaraite occurs as pseudomorphic masses after vivianite (Fe^{3+}_{2}(PO_{4})_{2}·8 H_{2}O). In the process, monoclinic vivianite oxidizes to form the amorphous santabarbaraite. Pseudomorphism may be seen in Victoria, Australia, in Wannon Falls (originally a well-known locality for vivianite). It also may be seen at Lake Baikal, Siberia where the oxidized santabarbaraite may be seen as a rim surrounding vivianite due to exposure to air.

== Physical properties ==
Due to pseudomorphism, Santabarbaraite samples show elongated and flattened prism habits. The bulk crystal color is brown to light brown, but appears yellow brown when viewed under an optical microscope. The streak color of the mineral is yellow-umber. Santabarbaraite has a vitreous-to-greasy luster and shows no fluorescence under ultraviolet light. It is translucent and shows good parting along the cleavage of its original mineral vivianite at {010}. Santabarbaraite's density is 2.24 g/cm^{3}. The mineral is isotropic, with refractive index n=1.659.

== Taxonomy ==
Santabarbaraite is named after Santa Barbara, a mining district in Italy where, in 2000, the mineral was discovered and first described. The district name honors the saint of miners, Saint Barbara, which by association, makes santabarbaraite one of few minerals bearing the name of a woman.

== Geologic occurrence ==
Santabarbaraite occurs in several places. It occurs in the Valderno Superiore lignite-bearing basin in the Santa Barbara mining district, Tuscany, Italy. Santabarbaraite samples may be seen in Victoria, Australia, underlying Pliocene basalt beneath Wannon Falls. It also is found in samples from Lake Baikal, Siberia.

== Biological occurrence ==
Since its discovery in 2000, this mineral hydrate has been found in the teeth of a living organism, the Gumboot chiton.
