= Perhamite =

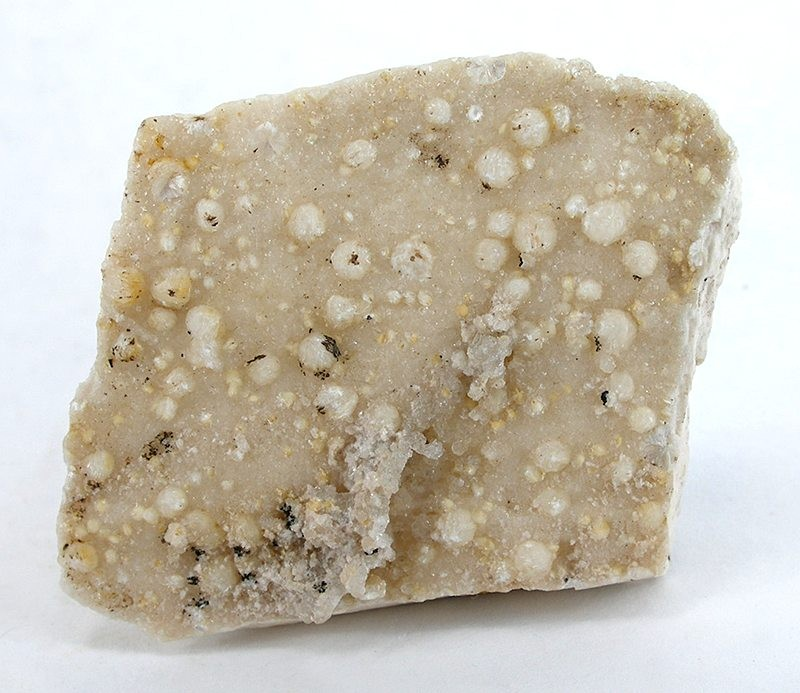
- Perhamite (spherical crystals aggregates) and sparkly apatite druse on feldspar.

General
- Category: Phosphate minerals
- Formula: Ca_{3}Al_{7}(SiO_{4})_{3}(PO_{4})_{4}(OH)_{3}·16.5(H_{2}O)
- IMA symbol: Phm
- Strunz classification: 8.DO.20
- Dana classification: 43.5.10.1
- Crystal system: Trigonal
- Crystal class: Hexagonal scalenohedral (3̅m); H-M symbol: (3̅ 2/m)
- Space group: P3̅m1
- Unit cell: a = 7.021 Å, c = 20.218 Å; Z = 1

Identification
- Color: Colourless, white, light brown, orange
- Crystal habit: Spherulitic masses of platy crystals
- Cleavage: imperfect/fair
- Mohs scale hardness: 5
- Luster: Vitreous, sub vitreous, pearly
- Streak: White
- Specific gravity: 2.53
- Solubility: Insoluble

Perhamite is a phosphate mineral with the formula Ca_{3}Al_{7}(SiO_{4})_{3}(PO_{4})_{4}(OH)_{3}·16.5(H_{2}O). It occurs in rare isolated masses in amblygonite-rich pegmatite deposits throughout the world. It was discovered in platy sheed form of 1mm hexagonal crystals. It was first described in 1977 by P.J. Dunn and D.E. Appleman from pegmatite collected from Bell Pit, Newry, Maine. Other specimens have been found in Kapunda, South Australia, in Silver Coin mine near Humboldt County, Nevada and various locations throughout Europe.

== Composition ==
The formula Ca_{3}Al_{7}(SiO_{4})_{3}(PO_{4})_{4}(OH)_{3}·16.5(H_{2}O) was determined by measuring its composition with x-ray spectroscopy giving the average amounts of SiO_{2} to be 13.72%, Al_{2}O_{3} to be 27.17%, CaO to be 12.81%, P_{2}O_{5} to be 21.61%, leaving 24.69% to be determined as H_{2}O. The formula's essential elements are Al, Ca, H, O, P and Si with trace amounts of Sr. Common impurities of perhamite include Ti, Fe, Mg, Na, and F.

== Physical properties ==
Perhamite can range in color from white to brown and can be translucent to opaque. Its luster is said to be earthy, but vitreous to pearly along fractures. It occurs as radial discoidal, platy hexagonal crystals, in rough spherules up to 1mm thick. The specific gravity of perhamite is measured at 2.64 with a calculated density of 2.53. It is structurally related to minerals in the crandallite subgroup, namely Iangreyite.

== Origin of the name ==
Perhamite is named after Frank Croydon Perham (born 1934), an American geologist and pegmatite miner of West Paris, Maine who is currently part of the faculty of The Maine Pegmatite Workshop and has over 45 years experience in mining pegmatites. Frank Perham died on 31 January 2023.

== See also ==
- List of minerals
