= Xanthoxenite =

General
- Category: Phosphate minerals
- Formula: Ca_{4}Fe^{3+}_{2}(PO_{4})_{4}(OH)_{2}·3H_{2}O
- IMA symbol: Xox
- Strunz classification: 8.DH.40
- Crystal system: Triclinic
- Crystal class: Pinacoidal (1̅) (same H-M symbol)
- Space group: P1̅
- Unit cell: a = 6.7 Å, b = 8.85 Å c = 6.54 Å; α = 92.1° β = 110.1°, γ = 93.2°; Z = 1

Identification
- Formula mass: 739.95 g/mol
- Color: Pale to brownish yellow
- Crystal habit: Occurs as platy crystals and as lamellar aggregates and crusts
- Cleavage: Perfect {010}
- Mohs scale hardness: 2.5
- Luster: Earthy (dull)
- Streak: White
- Diaphaneity: Translucent
- Specific gravity: 2.97 measured, 3.38 calculated
- Optical properties: Biaxial (-)
- Refractive index: n_{α} = 1.704 n_{β} = 1.715 n_{γ} = 1.724

Xanthoxenite is a rare calcium iron(III) phosphate mineral with formula: Ca_{4}Fe^{3+}_{2}(PO_{4})_{4}(OH)_{2}·3H_{2}O. It occurs as earthy pale to brownish yellow incrustations and lath shaped crystals. It crystallizes in the triclinic crystal system. It occurs as an alteration product of triphylite in pegmatites. It occurs associated with apatite, whitlockite, childrenite–eosphorite, laueite, strunzite, stewartite, mitridatite, amblygonite and siderite.

It has been found in Australia, Brazil, Portugal, Spain, Ukraine, and the United States. It was first described in 1920 for an occurrence in North Groton, Grafton County, New Hampshire.
