= Xiangjiangite =

General
- Category: Phosphate minerals
- Formula: (Fe^{3+}, Al)(UO_{2})_{4}(PO_{4})_{2}(SO_{4})_{2}(OH)·22(H_{2}O)
- IMA symbol: Xjg
- Strunz classification: 8.EB.05
- Crystal system: Tetragonal; Unknown space group
- Unit cell: 1,142.31

Identification
- Formula mass: 453.91 g/mol
- Color: Yellow
- Crystal habit: Microscopic crystals; Platy
- Mohs scale hardness: 1–2
- Luster: Silky
- Streak: Light yellow
- Diaphaneity: Semitransparent
- Specific gravity: 3.47
- Optical properties: Biaxial(−)
- Refractive index: n_{α} = 1.558 n_{β} = 1.576 n_{γ} = 1.593
- Birefringence: 0.035
- Pleochroism: Weak
- 2V angle: 87
- Dispersion: Weak
- Other characteristics: Radioactive

Xiangjiangite is a phosphate mineral discovered near and named for the Xiang Jiang River in China. It was approved by the IMA in 1978, and was named after its locality.

== Properties ==
Xiangjiangite is a pleochroic mineral, which is an optical phenomenon, meaning that depending on the axis it is viewed on, it appears as it changes colors. On both the X and Y axis, it can be seen in a yellow color, while on the Z axis it appears to be weak yellow color. This mineral is very strongly radioactive, and has a 3,845,084.01 radioactivity measured in GRapi.

It mainly consists of uranium (49.67%) and oxygen (39.23%), but otherwise contains sulphur (3.35%), phosphorus (3.23%), hydrogen (2.37%), iron (1.46%) and aluminum (0.70%).
