= Bobfergusonite =

Mineral

General
- Category: Phosphate mineral
- Formula: Na_{2}Mn_{5}FeAl(PO_{4})_{6}
- IMA symbol: Bfg
- Strunz classification: 8.AC.15
- Dana classification: 38.2.4.5
- Crystal system: Monoclinic
- Crystal class: Prismatic (2/m) (same H-M symbol)
- Space group: P2_{1}/n
- Unit cell: a = 12.773 Å, b = 12.486 Å, c = 11.038 Å; β = 114.35(13)°; Z = 4

Identification
- Color: Green-brown to red-brown
- Cleavage: Perfect on {010} Parting on {100}
- Fracture: Irregular/Uneven
- Tenacity: Brittle
- Mohs scale hardness: 4
- Luster: Sub-vitreous, resinous, greasy
- Streak: Yellow-brown
- Diaphaneity: Translucent to transparent
- Density: 3.54 g/cm^{3}
- Optical properties: Biaxial (+)
- Refractive index: n_{α} = 1.694(1) n_{β} = 1.698(1) n_{γ} = 1.715(2)
- Birefringence: δ = 0.021
- Pleochroism: Visible: X=Y= yellow-orange Z= orange
- 2V angle: 46°
- Dispersion: Relatively strong
- Ultraviolet fluorescence: Not fluorescent

Bobfergusonite is a mineral with formula Na_{2}Mn_{5}FeAl(PO_{4})_{6}. The mineral varies in color from green-brown to red-brown. It was discovered in 1986 in Manitoba, Canada, and named for Robert Bury Ferguson (1920–2015), a professor of geological sciences at the University of Manitoba. As of 2012, the mineral has only been found in Canada and Argentina.

== Description ==
Bobfergusonite occurs as equant anhedral single crystals up to 1 cm (0.39 in) in size or as nodular aggregates of few crystals. The mineral varies in color from green-brown to red-brown. Thin fragments of bobfergusonite are transparent. Bobfergusonite has been found in association with alluaudite, apatite, beusite, fillowite, and triplite.

Bobfergusonite is a primary mineral that occurs in the intermediate zone of manganese and fluorine enriched granitic pegmatites.

== Structure ==
Bobfergusonite has a layered crystal structure topologically identical to that of alluaudite and wyllieite but with differences in the ordering of metal cations. The two types of layer alternate along Y. One layer consists of chains of metal cation octahedra cross-linked by phosphate tetrahedra. Within the chains metal cations are ordered M^{3+}–M^{2+} in a similar fashion to wyllieite. However, the structure of bobfergusonite is distinct by the presence of Al and Fe^{3+} ordering between chains.

The other layer, identical to its wyllieite counterpart, consists of chains running parallel to X: one consisting of alternating, face-sharing sodium and manganese polyhedra and the other edge-sharing sodium polyhedra. These chains are not cross-linked but bind the other layers together.

== History ==
Alan J. Anderson discovered large brown crystals in a granitic pegmatite at Cross Lake in Manitoba. Study by electron microprobe and X-ray diffraction identified it as a new mineral related to the wyllieite and alluaudite groups.

The mineral was named for professor Robert Bury Ferguson to celebrate his 65th birthday and retirement from the University of Manitoba. The mineral and the name bobfergusonite were approved by the IMA Commission on New Minerals and Mineral Names.

== Distribution ==
As of 2012, bobfergusonite is known from the Nancy pegmatite in Argentina and the Gottcha Claim in Manitoba, Canada. The type material is held at the University of Manitoba and the Royal Ontario Museum in Toronto.
