= Babefphite =

Rare phosphate mineral

General
- Category: Phosphate mineral
- Formula: BaBe(PO_{4})(F,OH)
- IMA symbol: Bbf
- Strunz classification: 8.BA.15
- Crystal system: Triclinic
- Crystal class: Pedial (1) (same H-M symbol)
- Space group: F1
- Unit cell: a = 6.889 Å, b = 16.814 Å, c = 6.902 Å; α = 90.01°, β = 89.99°, γ = 90.32°; Z = 8

Identification
- Color: White
- Crystal habit: As anhedral, equant to flattened grains, to 1.5 mm; may be in aggregates, (pseudotetragonal)
- Tenacity: Brittle
- Mohs scale hardness: 3.5
- Luster: Vitreous
- Streak: White
- Diaphaneity: Transparent
- Specific gravity: 4.31
- Optical properties: Uniaxial (+) – biaxial positive (pseudouniaxial)
- Refractive index: nω = 1.629 nε = 1.632
- Birefringence: 0.003

Babefphite is a rare phosphate mineral with the general formula BaBe(PO_{4})(F,OH). The name is given for its composition (Ba meaning barium, Be meaning beryllium, F meaning fluorine, and P for phosphorus).

== Crystallography ==
Babefphite is tetragonal, which means crystallographically, it contains two horizontal and interchangeable equal axes (a_{1 and 2}) and a longitudinal axis (c). It belongs to the 4/m 2/m 2/m point group; meaning it has four horizontal axes of twofold symmetry, two of which coincide with the crystallographic axes (a_{1}) and (a_{2}) and the remaining two at 45° to the (a_{1}) and (a_{2}).

== Optical properties ==
Babefphite is an anisotropic mineral meaning that the velocity of light passing through it will vary depending on the direction of travel. When measured against Canada Balsam it will display moderate positive relief. Relief is an optical property that relates the index of refraction of a mineral versus the index of refraction of another material. Positive relief denotes light being bent toward the mineral. Negative relief means the light is bent toward the mounting material. In the case of optical mineralogy, this other material is most often whatever material is used to mount the mineral in question in thin section. Based on the white color of babefphite in hand sample it is likely that it appears clear in thin section under plane polarized light. Due to its anisotropic nature, it has the possibility of displaying very weak pleochroism under the same conditions. Pleochroism is defined as a change of color, on rotation, of plane light. It occurs when the extraordinary and ordinary rays of light are absorbed differently, thereby displaying different colors. The wider the difference in the rays the more dramatic the color change. Babefphite is also weakly birefringent. Birefringence is an optical property that is determined by the direction that light passes through a mineral.

== Occurrence ==
Babefphite was first described in 1966 for an occurrence at the Aunik fluorite-rare metals deposit, Buryatia, Eastern-Siberian Region, Russia. It has also been reported from the Rožná pegmatite in the Vysočina Region, Moravia, Czech Republic.

In the Siberian occurrence it occurs in residual material above rare-earth metal bearing skarns associated with alkaline intrusive bodies. It occurs with zircon, ilmenorutile, fluorite, phenakite, scheelite, bertrandite, albite, microcline and quartz.
