= Alforsite =

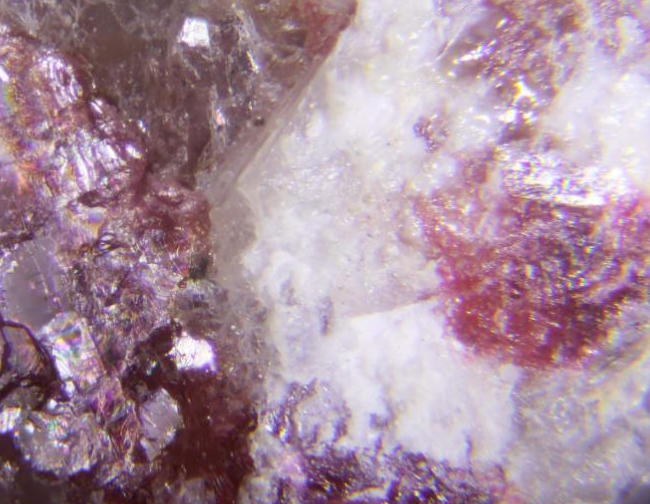
- Alforiste, SEM (by Parvel M. Kartashov)

General
- Category: Phosphate minerals Apatite group
- Formula: Ba_{5}(PO_{4})_{3}Cl
- IMA symbol: Afr
- Strunz classification: 8.BN.05
- Crystal system: Hexagonal
- Crystal class: Dipyramidal (6/m); H-M symbol: (6/m)
- Space group: P6_{3}/m
- Unit cell: a = 10.25, c = 7.64 [Å]; Z = 2

Identification
- Color: Colorless
- Crystal habit: Subhedral, fine grained masses
- Mohs scale hardness: 5
- Luster: Vitreous
- Streak: White
- Diaphaneity: Semitransparent
- Specific gravity: 4.73 – 4.80
- Optical properties: Uniaxial (−)
- Refractive index: n_{ω} = 1.700 n_{ε} = 1.700
- Birefringence: δ = 0.000
- Other characteristics: Intense violet cathodoluminescence

Alforsite is a barium phosphate chloride mineral with formula: Ba_{5}(PO_{4})_{3}Cl. It was discovered in 1981, and named to honor geologist John T. Alfors (1930–2005) of the California Geological Survey for his work in the area where it was discovered.

Alforsite is a hexagonal colorless crystal in the chemical class phosphates and the group apatite. It is found in certain parts of central California, primarily Fresno, Mariposa, and Tulare Counties. It has also been found in Baja California, Mexico.

Alforsite is a constituent of the apatite group of minerals. It crystallizes in the hexagonal crystal system with a point group of 6/m and space group P6_{3}/m. It occurs as colorless grains that are hard to distinguish from fluoroapatite, as they both display low birefringence and high relief.

== Composition ==
Alforsite's ideal chemical formula is Ba_{5}(PO_{3})_{4}Cl. Chemical analysis of the composition of alfrosite was demonstrated by the use of an Ortex current digitizer and an electron microbe. Synthetic barium chlorapatite, strontianite, and fluorapatite were used as standards for the elements they contain. The chemical analysis revealed that traces of Mn, S, Si, and Pb were present and provided computational formulas of (Ba_{4.68}Sr_{0.19}Ca_{0.13})(P_{2.98}Si_{0.01})O_{11.96}(Cl_{0.99}F_{0.05}) and (Ba_{4.05}Ca_{0.75}Sr_{0.24}Pb_{0.03})(P_{2.94}Si_{0.01})O_{11.93}(Cl_{0.93}F_{0.14}).

== Structure ==
Alforsite exhibits Lau symmetry 6/m. It is concluded that the space group is P63/m because every single apatite compound possess that space group. The parameters of the unit cell are a=10.25 Å and c=7.64 Å. One barium atom in the unit cell is enclosed by nine oxygen atoms with a mean distance of 2.824 Å. Another barium atom is surrounded by six oxygen atoms with a mean distance of 2.791 Å and 3.230 Å, which creates two crystallographically distinctive barium atoms. The phosphate group in alforsite forms a regular tetrahedron.

== Geologic occurrence ==
It is found crystallizing in the massive metasedimentary rock, sanbornite, which is found near granodiorite intrusions in Fresno and Mariposa counties, California. John T. Alfors’ colleagues named the mineral in his honor for his works with rare barium minerals of the sanbornite deposits.

Alforsite was first discovered in samples from the Big Creek locality. Electron microprobe analysis of a thin-section of the sample from Big Creek revealed the new mineral, which resembled ordinary apatite. Rare barium minerals, mainly silicates, can be uncovered in sanbornite deposits of eastern Fresno and Mariposa counties, California. Alforsite is found in metamorphic sanbornite quartz, which occurs within a few hundred meters of granodiorite intrusions, and foliated quartzite. Gneissic banded rocks contain the mineral, which has been shown to be associated with witherite, sanbornite, and celsian in samples (with quartz-rich and gillespite-rich bands) from Incline. In order for the witherite- sanbornite-quartz to be stable, temperatures of 500 °C to 600 °C and pressures of 1–3 kbar are required.

== Special characteristics ==
Synthetic alforsite has environmental importance because it may be used to replicate contamination by lead without the harmful effects of lead toxicity. For this reason, remediation of metal in soil can be practiced. Synthetic alforsite is prepared in a laboratory and mixed with soil to create a polluted soil, and then is treated with a mixture of salt and ammonium dihydrogen phosphate and maintained at a pH level of nine for two weeks.

== Physical properties ==
Alforsite occurs as colorless, minuscule subhedral grains with a diameter less than 0.05 mm. However, on rare occasions, it can crystallize to a diameter up to 0.2 mm. Minerals that belong to different groups, such as silicates, and sulfates exhibit the structural typology of apatite. This can pose problems and confusion because alforsite bears an almost exact resemblance to other barium silicates, which exemplifies its group Greek name, apatao, meaning, “I am misleading”. The only way to differentiate alforsite from other barium minerals is through microchemical analysis (Walstrom and Leising, 2005). This misleading mineral emulates the physical and structural features of apatite and is analogously similar to chlorapatite, providing alfrosite with the alternate name, barium chlorapatite. Alforsite has a low birefringence and a high relief resembling fluorapatite in thin-section. A reddish-violet cathodoluminescence appears on thin-section showing major levels of chlorine, phosphorus, and barium. Alforsite can be recognized by electron microprobe analysis or by intense violet fluorescence in the 10–15 kV electron beam of a luminoscope

== Origin of the name ==
The mineral Alforsite was named for John T. Alfors in recognition of his extensive research of the type locality of barium minerals and other related rare and new minerals. John T. Alfors was a highly regarded geologist and mineralogist who worked for the state Division of Mines and Geology in California.
