= Graftonite =

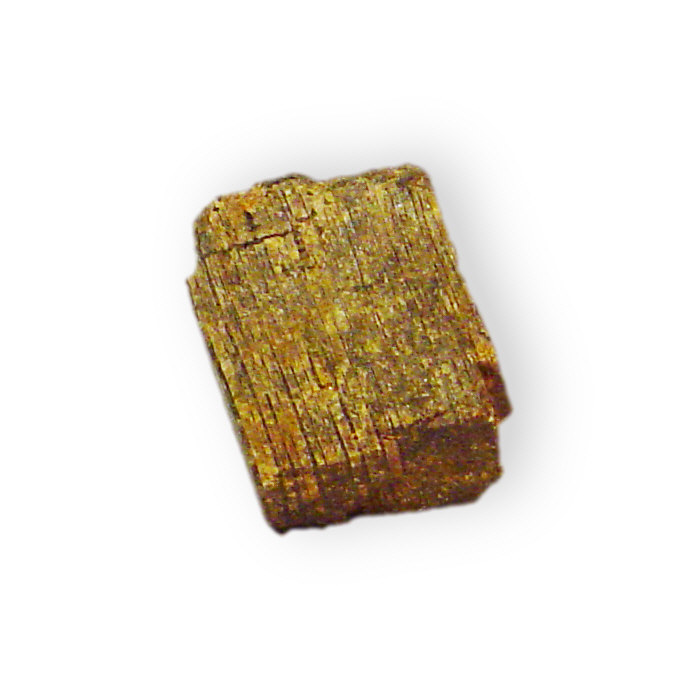
- Graftonite with Triphylite Iron manganese calcium phosphate Palermo Mine, North Groton, New Hampshire

General
- Category: Phosphate minerals
- Formula: (Fe^{2+},Mn,Ca)_{3}(PO_{4})_{2}
- Strunz classification: 8.AB.20
- Crystal system: Monoclinic
- Crystal class: Prismatic (2/m) (same H-M symbol)
- Space group: P2_{1}/c

Graftonite is an iron(II), manganese, calcium phosphate mineral with the chemical formula (Fe^{2+},Mn,Ca)_{3}(PO_{4})_{2}. It forms lamellar to granular translucent brown to red-brown to pink monoclinic prismatic crystals. It has a vitreous luster with a Mohs hardness of 5 and a specific gravity of 3.67 to 3.7.

It was first described from its type locality of Melvin Mountain in the town of Grafton, in Grafton County, New Hampshire.
