= Lulzacite =

Phosphate mineral

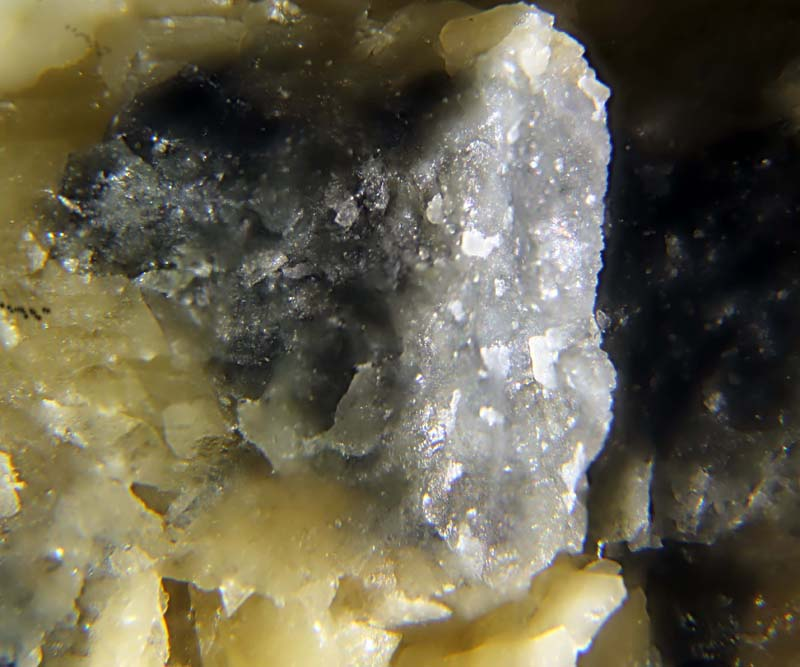
- Lulzacite found in France

General
- Category: Phosphate minerals
- Formula: Sr_{2}Fe^{2+}(Fe^{2+},Mg)_{2}Al_{4}(PO_{4})_{4}(OH)_{10}
- IMA symbol: Lul
- Strunz classification: 8.BK.25
- Crystal system: Triclinic
- Crystal class: Pinacoidal (1̅) (same H-M symbol)
- Space group: P1̅

Identification
- Color: Grayish-green to yellowish-green
- Crystal habit: Anhedral aggregates; rarely small euhedral crystals
- Cleavage: None
- Mohs scale hardness: 5.5–6
- Luster: Vitreous
- Diaphaneity: Transparent–translucent
- Specific gravity: 3.55
- Optical properties: Biaxial (−)
- Refractive index: n_{α} = 1.654 n_{β} = 1.674 n_{γ} = 1.684
- Birefringence: δ = 0.030

Lulzacite is a strontium-containing phosphate mineral with the chemical formula Sr_{2}Fe^{2+}(Fe^{2+},Mg)_{2}Al_{4}(PO_{4})_{4}(OH)_{10}.

The mineral was first described in 2000 from quartzite deposits (47°42′50″N 1°29′20″W) at Saint-Aubin-des-Châteaux, Loire-Atlantique, France, and is named after Y. Lulzac, a French geologist who discovered the mineral. In this deposit, lulzacite occurs within quartz and siderite veinlets at quartzite–limestone contacts. Other minerals found in the veinlets include apatite, goyazite, and pyrite.

Lulzacite crystallizes in the triclinic system with P1̅ space group. It is isostructural with jamesite (Pb_{2}Zn(Fe^{2+},Zn)_{2}Fe^{3+}_{4}(AsO_{4})_{4}(OH)_{10}).
