= Fluellite =

Phosphate mineral

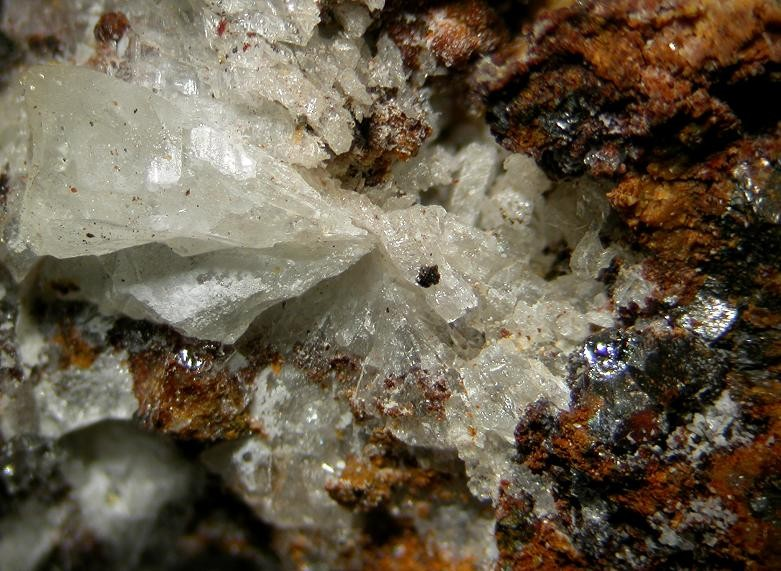
- Fluellite from Leveäniemi Mine, Svappavaara, Kiruna district, Lappland, Sweden

General
- Category: Phosphate minerals
- Formula: Al_{2}(PO_{4})F_{2}(OH)•7H_{2}O
- IMA symbol: Fll
- Strunz classification: 8.DE.10
- Crystal system: Orthorhombic
- Crystal class: Dipyramidal (mmm); H-M symbol: (2/m 2/m 2/m)
- Space group: Fddd

Identification
- Color: Colorless, white, pale yellow
- Crystal habit: Dipyramidal crystals commonly in aggregates; powdery, massive
- Cleavage: Indistinct on {001} and {111}
- Mohs scale hardness: 3
- Luster: Vitreous
- Diaphaneity: Transparent
- Specific gravity: 2.18
- Optical properties: Biaxial (+)
- Refractive index: n_{α} = 1.473 - 1.490 n_{β} = 1.490 - 1.496 n_{γ} = 1.506 - 1.511
- Birefringence: δ = 0.033
- Ultraviolet fluorescence: Fluorescent, Long UV=creamy white

Fluellite is a mineral with the chemical formula Al_{2}(PO_{4})F_{2}(OH)•7H_{2}O. The name is from its chemical composition, being a fluate of alumine (French).

It was first described in 1824 for an occurrence in the Stenna Gwyn Mine, St Stephen-in-Brannel, St Austell District, Cornwall, England.

It is a rare secondary mineral found in complex granite pegmatites where it forms by weathering of earlier phosphate minerals. It is found in association with fluorapatite, wavellite, phosphosiderite, strengite, aldermanite, cacoxenite, variscite, turquoise, fluorite and quartz.
