= Hotsonite =

General
- Category: Phosphate minerals, sulfate minerals
- Formula: Al_{11}(PO_{4)_{2}}(SO_{4)_{3}}(OH)_{21}.16H_{2}O
- IMA symbol: Hot
- Strunz classification: 08.DF.05
- Dana classification: 43.05.18.01
- Crystal system: Triclinic
- Space group: 1̅
- Unit cell: a= 0.9631, b= 1.0, c= 0.9048

Identification
- Color: White
- Crystal habit: Compact
- Fracture: Earthy
- Mohs scale hardness: 2.5
- Luster: Silky
- Streak: White
- Diaphaneity: Transparent
- Specific gravity: 2.06
- Density: 2.060-2.068
- Refractive index: Less than 0.003
- Other characteristics: Sometimes weakly fluorescent under SW and LW UV

Hotsonite is a mineral whose name derives from the farm Hotson 42, located 65 km west of the town of Pofadder, in Bushmanland, northwestern Cape Province, South Africa. This is an arid region with an average rainfall of 3 inches per annum. The name was approved by the Commission on New Minerals and Mineral Names of the International Mineralogical Association (July 1983) It is chemically related to sanjuanite and kribergite.

== Discovery and occurrence ==
Hotsonite was discovered while investigating for aluminous metamorphic rocks in an abandoned sillimanite quarry in 1982. The two senior authors sampled peculiar veins and encrustations of cryptocrystalline fine-grained white material. One of the materials had properties which could not be matched to any known mineral.

The mineral occurs closely with zaherite, Al_{12}(SO_{4)_{5}}(SO_{4)_{3}}(OH)_{26}.20H_{2}O.

== Physical properties ==
Hotsonite's physical properties are similar to other hydrated aluminous sulfates and some phosphates. It occurs as a white chalk like mineral with a dull to silky luster, and an earthy fracture. When observed under magnification of 500 times, it has a flaky appearance. Hotsonite appears with a white coloration, and small grain size. The Mohs hardness is 2.5, and with a density value of 2.060 to 2.068.

== Chemical composition ==
The chemical analysis was carried out using X-ray fluorescence, and the water was calculated by the Penfield method.

Oxide	wt %
SiO_{2}	0.35
Al_{2}O_{3}	39.15
Fe_{2}O_{3}	0.03
MgO	0.28
CaO	0.24
Na_{2}O	0.21
K_{2}O	0.00
P_{2}O_{5}	9.85
SO_{3}	16.80
H_{2}O	33.30
Total	100.21

== Diffraction information ==
Powder diffraction used for hotsonite data:

d(obs)	d(calc)	(hkl)	l/l
10.05	10.05	010	100
8.45	8.42	11-1	40
6.13	6.11	011	1
5.48	5.50	111	1
5.20	5.19	11-2	10
5.01	5.03	020	10
4.97	4.97	1-1-1	2
4.77	4.76	20-1	2
4.63	4.64	10-2	20
4.43	4.43	220	10
4.34	4.34	21-2	7
3.91	3.91	012	7
3.67	3.67	2-1-1	10
3.62	3.63	2-11	2
3.46	3.46	1-2-1	6
3.30	3.31	22-3	1
3.13	3.14	33-2	3
3.08	3.08	311	2
2.97	2.97	30-2	1
2.87	2.87	24-1	2
2.83	2.83	12-2	2
2.75	2.75	222	1
2.68	2.68	34-1	1
2.58	2.60	22-4	1
2.56	2.56	04-2	1
2.47	2.47	430	1
2.41	2.41	411	1
2.34	2.34	241	1
2.32	2.32	20-4	1
2.28	2.28	2-32	1
2.25	2.25	344	1
2.23	2.23	35-1	1
2.17	2.17	511	1
2.14	2.14	303	1
2.11	2.11	510	1
2.06	2.06	41-4	1
2.01	2.01	050	1
1.984	-	-	1
1.944	-	-	2
1.921	-	-	1
1.900	-	-	1
1.867	-	-	1
1.844	-	-	1
1.782	-	-	3
1.687	-	-	1
1.682	-	-	1
1.665	-	-	1
1.585	-	-	2
1.539	-	-	1
1.526	-	-	1
1.495	-	-	1
1.462	-	-	1
1.449	-	-	1
1.407	-	-	1
1.378	-	-	1
1.368	-	-	1
