= Segelerite =

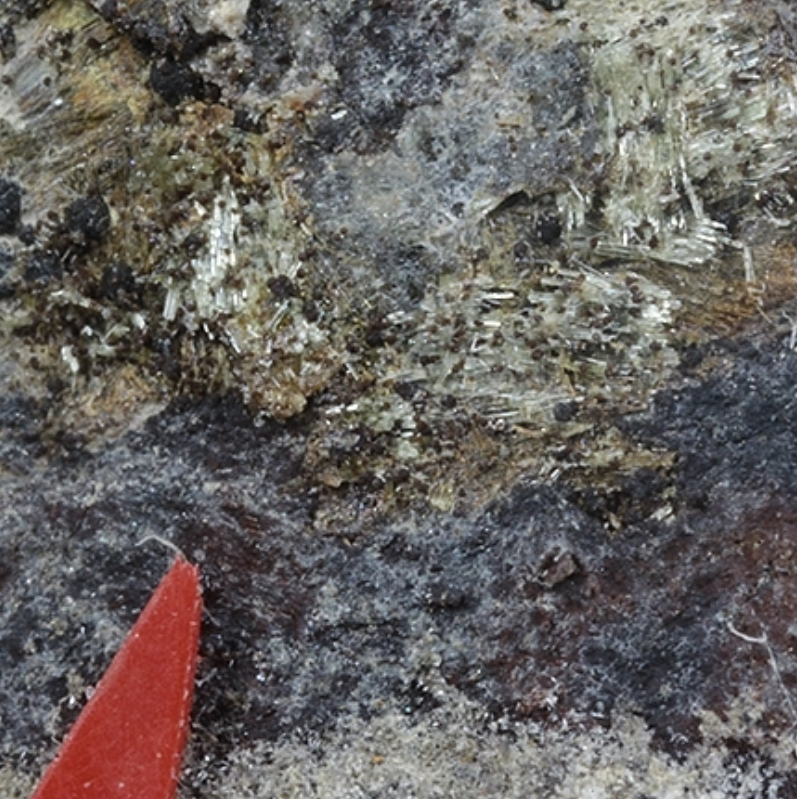
- Pale yellow needle-like crystals of segelerite

General
- Category: Phosphate minerals
- Formula: Ca2 Mg2 Fe3+2(PO4)4(OH)2 · 8H2O
- IMA symbol: Sgl
- Crystal system: Orthorhombic

Identification
- Color: Green, chartreuse, colorless, pale yellow
- Cleavage: Perfect
- Luster: Vitreous
- Streak: White
- Specific gravity: 2.67

Segelerite is a complex phosphate mineral with formula CaMgFe^{3+}OH(PO_{4})_{2}·H_{2}O. It occurs in pegmatites and forms striking green or chartreuse crystals. It was discovered in 1974 in the Black Hills of South Dakota by an amateur mineralogist from New York, Curt G. Segeler (1901–1989), after whom it is named.

It is closely related to overite which is virtually the same mineral except that the iron is replaced by aluminium. Another mineral in the same series is juonniite wherein the iron is also replaced, this time by scandium.
