= Archerite =

Phosphate mineral

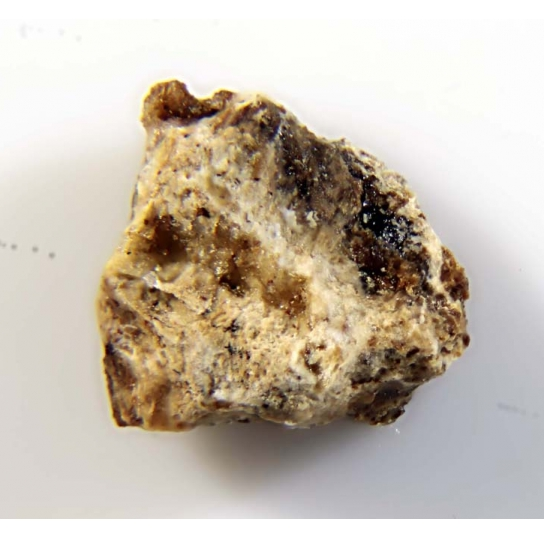
- Archerite (white) on a biphosphammite crystal

General
- Category: Minerals
- Formula: (K,NH_{4})H_{2}PO_{4}
- IMA symbol: Aht
- Strunz classification: 8.AD.15
- Dana classification: 37.1.4.2
- Crystal system: Tetragonal

Identification
- Color: White
- Cleavage: None
- Fracture: Uneven
- Tenacity: Brittle
- Mohs scale hardness: 1-2
- Luster: Sub-Vitreous, Waxy, Greasy
- Streak: White
- Diaphaneity: Translucent
- Specific gravity: 2.23
- Density: 2.23 g/cm3

Archerite (IMA symbol: Aht) is a phosphate mineral with chemical formula (K,NH_{4})H_{2}PO_{4}. It's named after Michael Archer (born 25 March 1945), professor of Biology, University of New South Wales. Its type locality is Petrogale Cave, Madura Roadhouse, Dundas Shire, Western Australia. It occurs in guano containing caves as wall encrustations and stalactites.
