= Althupite =

Aluminium thorium uranyl phosphate mineral

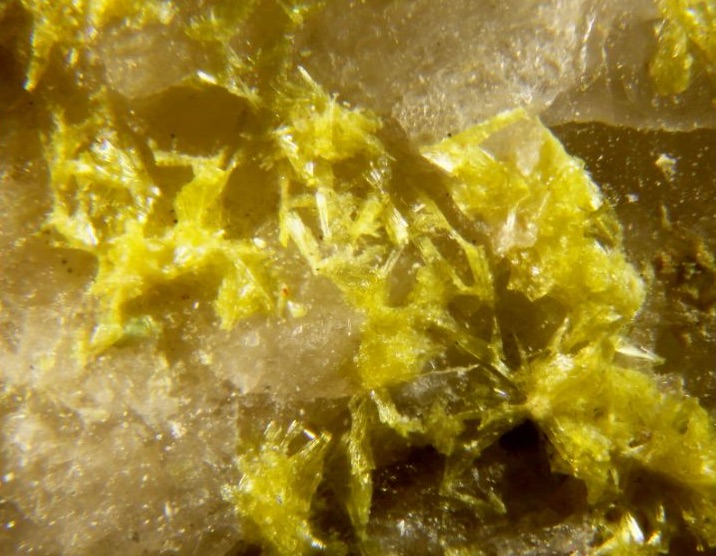
- Yellow crystals of the extremely rare Th-U mineral althupite from the type and only known locality worldwide in Kobokobo (Kobokobo Pegmatite, Mwenga, South Kivu, DR Congo). Vandenbroucke Museum collection from Waregem, Belgium.

General
- Category: Minerals
- Formula: AlTh(UO_{2})_{7}(PO_{4})_{4}O_{2}(OH)_{5}·15H_{2}O
- IMA symbol: App

Identification
- Color: Yellow
- Tenacity: Flexible
- Mohs scale hardness: 3.5-4
- Luster: Vitreous, Sub-Vitreous
- Streak: Yellow
- Diaphaneity: Transparent
- Specific gravity: 3.91
- Other characteristics: Radioactive

Althupite (IMA symbol: Ahp) is a rare aluminium thorium uranyl phosphate mineral with complex formula written as AlTh(UO_{2})_{7}(PO_{4})_{4}O_{2}(OH)_{5}·15H_{2}O, from a granitic pegmatite. It is named after its composition (ALuminium, THorium, Uranium, and Phosphorus).
