= Lithiophosphate =

Phosphate mineral

General
- Category: Phosphate minerals
- Formula: Li_{3}PO_{4}
- IMA symbol: Lip
- Strunz classification: 8.AA.20
- Crystal system: Orthorhombic
- Crystal class: Dipyramidal (mmm); H-M symbol: (2/m 2/m 2/m)
- Space group: Pcmn

Identification
- Color: white, light pink, colorless
- Cleavage: perfect
- Tenacity: brittle
- Mohs scale hardness: 4
- Luster: vitreous, sub-vitreous
- Streak: white
- Diaphaneity: transparent, translucent

Lithiophosphate is a natural form of (pure) lithium orthophosphate. It is an exceedingly rare mineral, occurring in some special types of pegmatites.

== See also ==
- Lithium phosphate
