= Skorpionite =

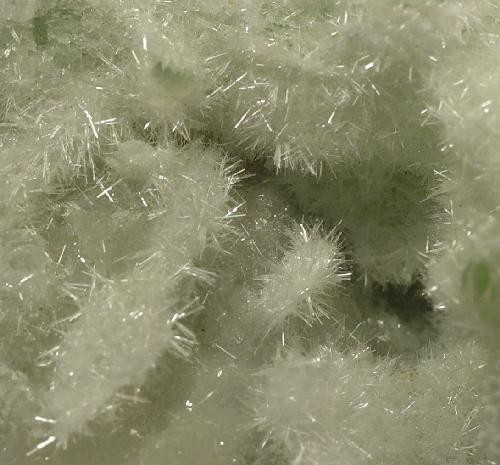
- Skorpionite

General
- Category: Phosphate mineral
- Formula: Ca_{3}Zn_{2}(PO_{4})_{2}CO_{3}(OH)_{2}·H_{2}O
- IMA symbol: Skr
- Strunz classification: 8.DO.45
- Dana classification: 43.5.20.
- Crystal system: Monoclinic
- Crystal class: Prismatic (2/m) (same H-M symbol)
- Space group: B2/b
- Unit cell: a = 19.042 Å, b = 9.309 Å c = 6.519 Å; β = 92.72°; Z = 4

Identification
- Color: colorless
- Crystal habit: needle-like crystals elongated parallel to [001]; bladed, sword-shaped
- Fracture: irregullar/ uneven
- Tenacity: brittle
- Mohs scale hardness: 3 1/2
- Luster: vitreous
- Streak: white
- Diaphaneity: transparent
- Density: 3.15 g/cm^{3}
- Optical properties: Biaxial (-)
- Refractive index: n_{α} = 1.588 n_{β} = 1.645 n_{γ} = 1.646
- Birefringence: δ = 0.057
- 2V angle: 15.0° (measured)

Skorpionite (IMA2005-010) is a zinc phosphate mineral with chemical formula Ca_{3}Zn_{2}(PO_{4})_{2}CO_{3}(OH)_{2}·H_{2}O, originally found in the Skorpion Mine and named after it (Rosh Pinah, Lüderitz district, ǁKaras Region, Namibia).
