= Upalite =

General
- Category: Phosphate minerals
- Formula: Al(UO_{2})_{3}(PO_{4})_{2}O(OH)·7H_{2}O
- IMA symbol: Upa
- Strunz classification: 8.EC.05
- Crystal system: Monoclinic
- Crystal class: Prismatic (2/m) (same H-M symbol)
- Space group: P2_{1}/a
- Unit cell: a = 13.7 Å, b = 16.82 Å c = 9.33 Å; β = 111.5°; Z = 4

Identification
- Color: amber-yellow, yellow-brown
- Diaphaneity: transparent, translucent
- Other characteristics: Radioactive

Upalite (Al(UO_{2})_{3}(PO_{4})_{2}O(OH)·7H_{2}O) is a mineral found in the Democratic Republic of Congo. It is named after uranium, phosphorus and aluminium. Its type locality is Kobokobo pegmatite, Mwenga, Sud-Kivu, Democratic Republic of Congo.
