= Millisite =

Phosphate mineral

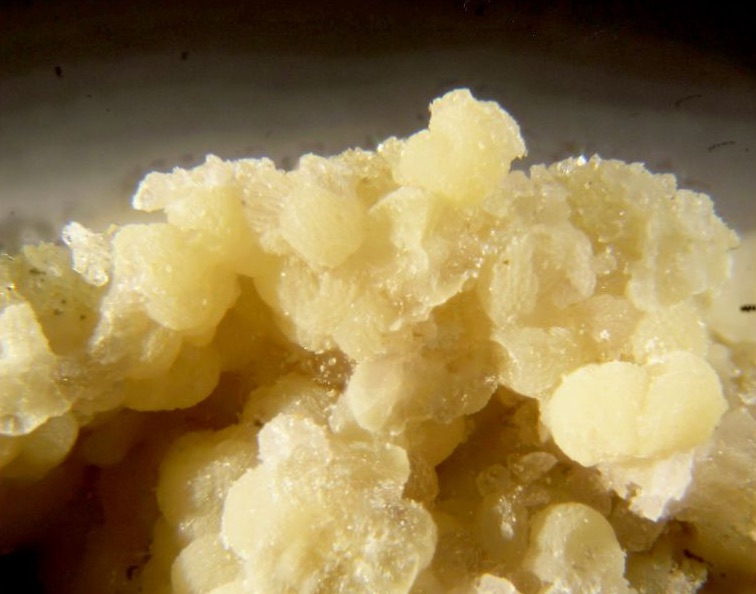
- Pale yellow globular aggregates of millisite from Fairfield, Utah

General
- Category: Phosphate minerals
- Formula: NaCaAl_{6}(PO_{4})_{4}(OH)_{9}·H_{2}O

Millisite is a rare phosphate mineral. The mineral was named after Mr. F. T. Millis of Lehi, Utah. Millisite can be found in altered phosphate deposits.

== Occurrence ==
Millisite was originally only known to occur in Fairfield, Utah and Thiès, Sénégal. It has since been identified in the Bone Valley Formation of Florida, where it forms a major component of the aluminum phosphate zone.
