= Mundite =

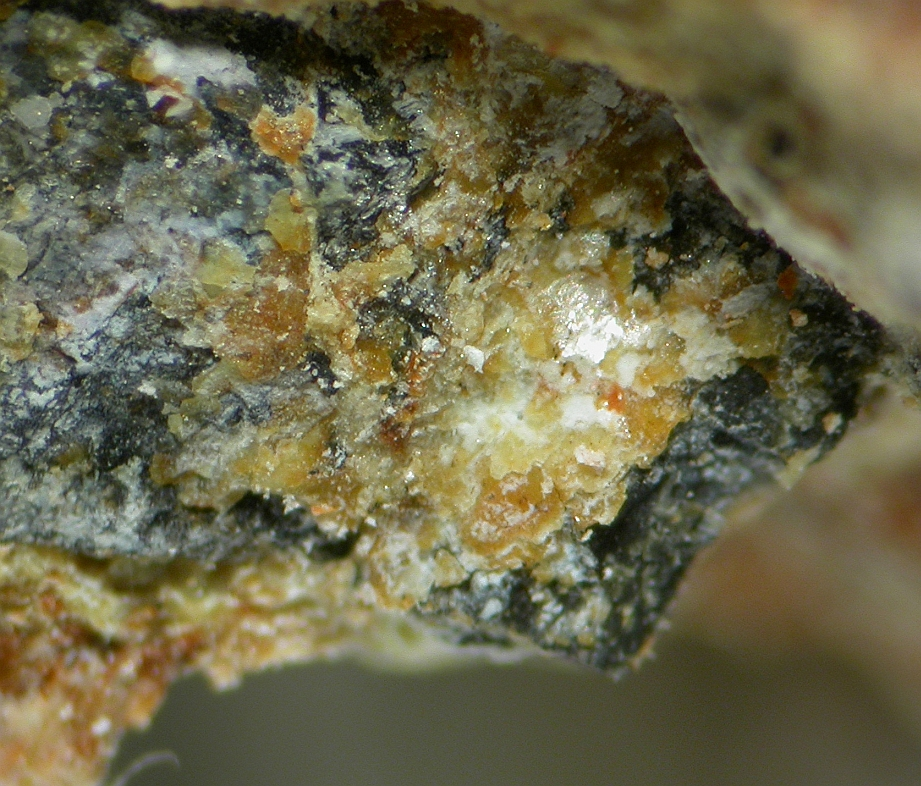
- Yellow to yellowish-orange mundite from Kobokobo pegmatite, Lusungu River District, Sud-Kivu, Democratic Republic of Congo (Zaïre) (field of view: 3 mm)

General
- Category: Phosphate minerals
- Formula: Al(UO_{2})_{3}(PO_{4})_{2}(OH)_{3}·5(H_{2}O)
- IMA symbol: Mud
- Strunz classification: 8.EC.30
- Crystal system: Orthorhombic; Unknown space group
- Space group: P2_{1}cn, Pmcn

Identification
- Other characteristics: Radioactive

Mundite is a uranium phosphate mineral with chemical formula: Al(UO_{2})_{3}(PO_{4})_{2}(OH)_{3}·5(H_{2}O). It contains aluminium and has a yellow tinge to it. It usually appears on sandstones or limestones.
