= Phosphate mineral =

Nickel–Strunz 9 ed mineral class number 8 (isolated tetrahedral units, mainly)

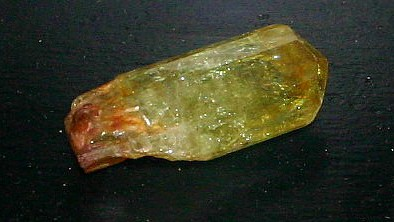
Apatite

Phosphate minerals are minerals that contain the tetrahedrally coordinated phosphate (PO^{3−}_{4}) anion, sometimes with arsenate (AsO^{3−}_{4}) and vanadate (VO^{3−}_{4}) substitutions, along with chloride (Cl^{−}), fluoride (F^{−}), and hydroxide (OH^{−}) anions, that also fit into the crystal structure.

The phosphate class of minerals is a large and diverse group, however, only a few species are relatively common.

== Applications ==
Phosphate rock, which contains high concentrations of apatite-group minerals, serves as the primary economic source for phosphorus extraction. The majority of mined phosphate minerals are utilized in the agricultural industry for the production of fertilizers and animal feed supplements. Beyond agriculture, these minerals are employed in industrial applications including water treatment, metallurgy, food preservation, ceramics, and cosmetics. Additionally, phosphate compounds are commonly utilized in electrochemical conversion coatings to control rust and inhibit corrosion on ferrous materials.

== Examples ==
Phosphate minerals include:

- Triphylite Li(Fe,Mn)PO_{4}
- Monazite (La, Y, Nd, Sm, Gd, Ce,Th)PO_{4}, rare earth metals
- Hinsdalite PbAl_{3}(PO_{4})(SO_{4})(OH)_{6}
- Pyromorphite Pb_{5}(PO_{4})_{3}Cl
- Amblygonite LiAlPO_{4}F
- Lazulite (Mg,Fe)Al_{2}(PO_{4})_{2}(OH)_{2}
- Wavellite Al_{3}(PO_{4})_{2}(OH)_{3}·5H_{2}O
- Turquoise CuAl_{6}(PO_{4})_{4}(OH)_{8}·5H_{2}O
- Autunite Ca(UO_{2})_{2}(PO_{4})_{2}·10–12H_{2}O
- Phosphophyllite Zn_{2}(Fe,Mn)(PO_{4})_{2}·4H_{2}O
- Struvite (NH_{4})MgPO_{4}·6H_{2}O
- Xenotime-Y Y(PO_{4})
- Apatite group Ca_{5}(PO_{4})_{3}(F,Cl,OH)
  - Hydroxyapatite Ca_{5}(PO_{4})_{3}OH
  - Fluorapatite Ca_{5}(PO_{4})_{3}F
  - Chlorapatite Ca_{5}(PO_{4})_{3}Cl
  - Bromapatite
- Mitridatite group:
  - Arseniosiderite-mitridatite series (Ca_{2}(Fe^{3+})_{3}[(O)_{2}|(AsO_{4})_{3}]·3H_{2}O -- Ca_{2}(Fe^{3+})_{3}[(O)_{2}|(PO_{4})_{3}]·3H_{2}O)
  - Arseniosiderite-robertsite series (Ca_{2}(Fe^{3+})_{3}[(O)_{2}|(AsO_{4})_{3}]·3H_{2}O -- Ca_{3}(Mn^{3+})_{4}[(OH)_{3}|(PO_{4})_{2}]_{2}·3H_{2}O)

== Nickel–Strunz classification -08- phosphates ==
IMA-CNMNC proposes a new hierarchical scheme (Mills et al., 2009). This list uses it to modify the classification of Nickel–Strunz (mindat.org, 10 ed, pending publication).

- Abbreviations:
  - "*" – discredited (IMA/CNMNC status).
  - "?" – questionable/doubtful (IMA/CNMNC status).
  - "REE" – Rare-earth element (Sc, Y, La, Ce, Pr, Nd, Pm, Sm, Eu, Gd, Tb, Dy, Ho, Er, Tm, Yb, Lu)
  - "PGE" – Platinum-group element (Ru, Rh, Pd, Os, Ir, Pt)
  - 03.C Aluminofluorides, 06 Borates, 08 Vanadates (04.H V^{[5,6]} Vanadates), 09 Silicates:
    - Neso: insular (from Greek νησος nēsos, island)
    - Soro: grouping (from Greek σωροῦ sōros, heap, mound (especially of corn))
    - Cyclo: ring
    - Ino: chain (from Greek ις [genitive: ινος inos], fibre)
    - Phyllo: sheet (from Greek φύλλον phyllon, leaf)
    - Tekto: three-dimensional framework
- Nickel–Strunz code scheme: NN.XY.##x
  - NN: Nickel–Strunz mineral class number
  - X: Nickel–Strunz mineral division letter
  - Y: Nickel–Strunz mineral family letter
  - ##x: Nickel–Strunz mineral/group number, x add-on letter

=== Class: phosphates ===
- 08.A Phosphates, etc. without additional anions, without H_{2}O
  - 08.AA With small cations (some also with larger ones): 05 Berlinite, 05 Rodolicoite; 10 Beryllonite, 15 Hurlbutite, 20 Lithiophosphate, 25 Nalipoite, 30 Olympite
  - 08.AB With medium-sized cations: 05 Farringtonite; 10 Ferrisicklerite, 10 Heterosite, 10 Natrophilite, 10 Lithiophilite, 10 Purpurite, 10 Sicklerite, 10 Simferite, 10 Triphylite; 15 Chopinite, 15 Sarcopside; 20 Beusite, 20 Graftonite
  - 08.AC With medium-sized and large cations: 10 IMA2008-054, 10 Alluaudite, 10 Hagendorfite, 10 Ferroalluaudite, 10 Maghagendorfite, 10 Varulite, 10 Ferrohagendorfite*; 15 Bobfergusonite, 15 Ferrowyllieite, 15 Qingheiite, 15 Rosemaryite, 15 Wyllieite, 15 Ferrorosemaryite; 20 Maricite, 30 Brianite, 35 Vitusite-(Ce); 40 Olgite?, 40 Bario-olgite; 45 Ferromerrillite, 45 Bobdownsite, 45 Merrillite-(Ca)*, 45 Merrillite, 45 Merrillite-(Y)*, 45 Whitlockite, 45 Tuite, 45 Strontiowhitlockite; 50 Stornesite-(Y), 50 Xenophyllite, 50 Fillowite, 50 Chladniite, 50 Johnsomervilleite, 50 Galileiite; 55 Harrisonite, 60 Kosnarite, 65 Panethite, 70 Stanfieldite, 90 IMA2008-064
  - 08.AD With only large cations: 05 Nahpoite, 10 Monetite, 15 Archerite, 15 Biphosphammite; 20 Phosphammite, 25 Buchwaldite; 35 Pretulite, 35 Xenotime-(Y), 35 Xenotime-(Yb); 45 Ximengite, 50 Monazite-(Ce), 50 Monazite-(La), 50 Monazite-(Nd), 50 Monazite-(Sm), 50 Brabantite?
- 08.B Phosphates, etc. with Additional Anions, without H_{2}O
  - 08.BA With small and medium-sized cations: 05 Vayrynenite; 10 Hydroxylherderite, 10 Herderite; 15 Babefphite
  - 08.BB With only medium-sized cations, (OH, etc.):RO_{4} £1:1: 05 Amblygonite, 05 Natromontebrasite?, 05 Montebrasite?, 05 Tavorite; 10 Zwieselite, 10 Triplite, 10 Magniotriplite?, 10 Hydroxylwagnerite; 15 Joosteite, 15 Stanekite, 15 Triploidite, 15 Wolfeite, 15 Wagnerite; 20 Satterlyite, 20 Holtedahlite; 25 Althausite; 30 Libethenite, 30 Zincolibethenite; 35 Tarbuttite; 40 Barbosalite, 40 Hentschelite, 40 Scorzalite, 40 Lazulite; 45 Trolleite, 55 Phosphoellenbergerite; 90 Zinclipscombite, 90 Lipscombite, 90 Richellite
  - 08.BC With only medium-sized cations, (OH, etc.):RO_{4} > 1:1 and < 2:1: 10 Plimerite, 10 Frondelite, 10 Rockbridgeite
  - 08.BD With only medium-sized cations, (OH, etc.):RO_{4} = 2:1: 05 Pseudomalachite, 05 Reichenbachite, 10 Gatehouseite, 25 Ludjibaite
  - 08.BE With only medium-sized cations, (OH, etc.):RO_{4} > 2:1: 05 Augelite, 10 Grattarolaite, 15 Cornetite, 30 Raadeite, 85 Waterhouseite
  - 08.BF With medium-sized and large cations, (OH, etc.):RO_{4} < 0.5:1: 05 Arrojadite, 05 Arrojadite-(BaFe), 05 Arrojadite-(KFe), 05 Arrojadite-(NaFe), 05 Arrojadite-(SrFe), 05 Arrojadite-(KNa), 05 Arrojadite-(PbFe), 05 Arrojadite-(BaNa), 05 Fluorarrojadite-(BaNa), 05 Fluorarrojadite-(KNa), 05 Fluorarrojadite-(BaFe), 05 Ferri-arrojadite-(BaNa), 05 Dickinsonite, 05 Dickinsonite-(KNa), 05 Dickinsonite-(KMnNa), 05 Dickinsonite-(KNaNa), 05 Dickinsonite-(NaNa); 10 Samuelsonite, 15 Griphite, 20 Nabiasite
  - 08.BG With medium-sized and large cations, (OH, etc.):RO_{4} = 0.5:1: 05 Bearthite, 05 Goedkenite, 05 Tsumebite; 10 Melonjosephite, 15 Tancoite
  - 08.BH With medium-sized and large cations, (OH,etc.):RO_{4} = 1:1: 05 Thadeuite; 10 Lacroixite, 10 Isokite, 10 Panasqueiraite; 15 Drugmanite; 20 Bjarebyite, 20 Kulanite, 20 Penikisite, 20 Perloffite, 20 Johntomaite; 25 Bertossaite, 25 Palermoite; 55 Jagowerite, 60 Attakolite
  - 08.BK With medium-sized and large cations, (OH, etc.): 05 Brazilianite, 15 Curetonite, 25 Lulzacite
  - 08.BL With medium-sized and large cations, (OH, etc.):RO_{4} = 3:1: 05 Corkite, 05 Hinsdalite, 05 Orpheite, 05 Woodhouseite, 05 Svanbergite; 10 Kintoreite, 10 Benauite, 10 Crandallite, 10 Goyazite, 10 Springcreekite, 10 Gorceixite; 10 Lusungite?, 10 Plumbogummite, 10 Ferrazite?; 13 Eylettersite, 13 Florencite-(Ce), 13 Florencite-(La), 13 Florencite-(Nd), 13 Waylandite, 13 Zairite; 15 Viitaniemiite, 20 Kuksite, 25 Pattersonite
  - 08.BM With medium-sized and large cations, (OH, etc.):RO_{4} = 4:1: 10 Paulkellerite, 15 Brendelite
  - 08.BN With only large cations, (OH, etc.):RO_{4} = 0.33:1: 05 IMA2008-068, 05 Phosphohedyphane, 05 IMA2008-009, 05 Alforsite, 05 Apatite*, 05 Apatite-(CaOH), 05 Apatite-(CaCl), 05 Apatite-(CaF), 05 Apatite-(SrOH), 05 Apatite-(CaOH)-M, Carbonate-fluorapatite?, 05 Carbonate-hydroxylapatite?, 05 Belovite-(Ce), 05 Belovite-(La), 05 Fluorcaphite, 05 Pyromorphite, 05 Hydroxylpyromorphite, 05 Deloneite-(Ce), 05 Kuannersuite-(Ce), 10 Arctite
  - 08.BO With only large cations, (OH, etc.):RO_{4} 1:1: 05 Nacaphite, 10 Petitjeanite, 15 Smrkovecite, 25 Heneuite, 30 Nefedovite, 40 Artsmithite
- 08.C Phosphates without Additional Anions, with H_{2}O
  - 08.CA With small and large/medium cations: 05 Fransoletite, 05 Parafransoletite; 10 Ehrleite, 15 Faheyite; 20 Gainesite, 20 Mccrillisite, 20 Selwynite; 25 Pahasapaite, 30 Hopeite, 40 Phosphophyllite; 45 Parascholzite, 45 Scholzite; 65 Gengenbachite, 70 Parahopeite
  - 08.CB With only medium-sized cations, RO_{4}:H_{2}O = 1:1: 05 Serrabrancaite, 10 Hureaulite
  - 08.CC With only medium-sized cations, RO_{4}:H_{2}O = 1:1.5: 05 Garyansellite, 05 Kryzhanovskite, 05 Landesite, 05 Phosphoferrite, 05 Reddingite
  - 08.CD With only medium-sized cations, RO_{4}:H_{2}O = 1:2: 05 Kolbeckite, 05 Metavariscite, 05 Phosphosiderite; 10 Strengite, 10 Variscite; 20 Ludlamite
  - 08.CE With only medium-sized cations, RO_{4}:H_{2}O £1:2.5: 10 Newberyite, 20 Phosphorrosslerite; 25 Metaswitzerite, 25 Switzerite; 35 Bobierrite; 40 Arupite, 40 Baricite, 40 Vivianite, 40 Pakhomovskyite; 50 Cattiite, 55 Koninckite; 75 IMA2008-046, 75 Malhmoodite; 80 Santabarbaraite, 85 Metavivianite
  - 08.CF With large and medium-sized cations, RO_{4}:H_{2}O > 1:1: 05 Tassieite, 05 Wicksite, 05 Bederite; 10 Haigerachite
  - 08.CG With large and medium-sized cations, RO_{4}:H_{2}O = 1:1: 05 Collinsite, 05 Cassidyite, 05 Fairfieldite, 05 Messelite, 05 Hillite, (05 Uranophane-beta but Uranophane 09.AK.15); 20 Phosphogartrellite
  - 08.CH With large and medium-sized cations, RO_{4}:H_{2}O < 1:1: 10 Anapaite, 20 Dittmarite, 20 Niahite, 25 Francoanellite, 25 Taranakite, 30 Schertelite, 35 Hannayite, 40 Hazenite, 40 Struvite, 40 Struvite-(K), 45 Rimkorolgite, 50 Bakhchisaraitsevite, 55 IMA2008-048
  - 08.CJ With only large cations: 05 Stercorite, 10 Mundrabillaite, 10 Swaknoite, 15 Nastrophite, 15 Nabaphite, 45 Brockite, 45 Grayite, 45 Rhabdophane-(Ce), 45 Rhabdophane-(La), 45 Rhabdophane-(Nd), 45 Tristramite, 50 Brushite, 50 Churchite-(Dy)*, 50 Churchite-(Nd), 50 Churchite-(Y), 50 Ardealite, 60 Dorfmanite, 70 Catalanoite, 80 Ningyoite
- 08.D Phosphates
  - 08.DA With small (and occasionally larger) cations: 05 Moraesite, 10 Footemineite, 10 Ruifrancoite, 10 Guimaraesite, 10 Roscherite, 10 Zanazziite, 10 Atencioite, 10 Greifensteinite; 15 Uralolite, 20 Weinebeneite, 25 Tiptopite, 30 Veszelyite, 35 Kipushite, 40 Spencerite, 45 Glucine
  - 08.DB With only medium-sized cations, (OH, etc.):RO_{4} < 1:1: 05 Diadochite, 10 Vashegyite, 15 Schoonerite, 20 Sinkankasite, 25 Mitryaevaite, 30 Sanjuanite, 50 Giniite, 55 Sasaite, 60 Mcauslanite, 65 Goldquarryite, 70 Birchite
  - 08.DC With only medium-sized cations, (OH, etc.):RO_{4} = 1:1 and < 2:1: 05 Nissonite; 15 Kunatite, 15 Earlshannonite, 15 Whitmoreite; 17 Kleemanite, 20 Bermanite, 207? Oxiberaunite*, 22 Kovdorskite; 25 Ferrostrunzite, 25 Ferristrunzite, 25 Metavauxite, 25 Strunzite; 27 Beraunite; 30 Gordonite, 30 Laueite, 30 Sigloite, 30 Paravauxite, 30 Ushkovite, 30 Ferrolaueite, 30 Mangangordonite, 30 Pseudolaueite, 30 Stewartite, 30 Kastningite, 35 Vauxite, 37 Vantasselite, 40 Cacoxenite; 45 Gormanite, 45 Souzalite; 47 Kingite; 50 Wavellite, 50 Allanpringite, 52 Kribergite, 60 Nevadaite
  - 08.DD With only medium-sized cations, (OH, etc.):RO_{4} = 2:1: 15 Aheylite, 15 Chalcosiderite, 15 Faustite, 15 Planerite, 15 Turquoise; 20 Ernstite, 20 Childrenite, 20 Eosphorite
  - 08.DE With only medium-sized cations, (OH, etc.):RO_{4} = 3:1: 05 Senegalite, 10 Fluellite, 20 Zapatalite, (35 Alumoakermanite, Mindat.org: 09.BB.10), 35 Aldermanite
  - 08.DF With only medium-sized cations, (OH,etc.):RO_{4} > 3:1: 05 Hotsonite-VII, 05 Hotsonite-VI; 10 Bolivarite, 10 Evansite, 10 Rosieresite, 25 Sieleckiite, 40 Gladiusite
  - 08.DG With large and medium-sized cations, (OH, etc.):RO_{4} < 0.5:1: 05 Sampleite
  - 08.DH With large and medium-sized cations, (OH, etc.):RO_{4} < 1:1: 05 Minyulite; 10 Leucophosphite, 10 Spheniscidite, 10 Tinsleyite; 15 Kaluginite*, 15 Keckite, 15 Jahnsite-(CaMnFe), 15 Jahnsite-(CaMnMg), 15 Jahnsite-(CaMnMn), 15 Jahnsite-(MnMnMn)*, 15 Jahnsite-(CaFeFe), 15 Jahnsite-(NaFeMg), 15 Jahnsite-(CaMgMg), 15 Jahnsite-(NaMnMg), 15 Rittmannite, 15 Whiteite-(MnFeMg), 15 Whiteite-(CaFeMg), 15 Whiteite-(CaMnMg); 20 Manganosegelerite, 20 Overite, 20 Segelerite, 20 Wilhelmvierlingite, 20 Juonniite; 25 Calcioferrite, 25 Kingsmountite, 25 Montgomeryite, 25 Zodacite; 30 Lunokite, 30 Pararobertsite, 30 Robertsite, 30 Mitridatite; 35 Matveevite?, 35 Mantienneite, 35 Paulkerrite, 35 Benyacarite, 40 Xanthoxenite, 55 Englishite
  - 08.DJ With large and medium-sized cations, (OH, etc.):RO_{4} = 1:l: 05 Johnwalkite, 05 Olmsteadite, 10 Gatumbaite, 20 Meurigite-Na, 20 Meurigite-K, 20 Phosphofibrite, 25 Jungite, 30 Wycheproofite, 35 Ercitite, 40 Mrazekite
  - 08.DK With large and medium-sized cations, (OH, etc.):RO_{4} > 1:1 and < 2:1: 15 Matioliite, 15 IMA2008-056, 15 Dufrenite, 15 Burangaite, 15 Natrodufrenite; 20 Kidwellite, 25 Bleasdaleite, 30 Matulaite, 35 Krasnovite
  - 08.DL With large and medium-sized cations, (OH, etc.):RO_{4} = 2:1: 05 Foggite; 10 Cyrilovite, 10 Millisite, 10 Wardite; 15 Petersite-(Y), 15 Calciopetersite; 25 Angastonite
  - 08.DM With large and medium-sized cations, (OH, etc.):RO_{4} > 2:1: 05 Morinite, 15 Melkovite, 25 Gutsevichite?, 35 Delvauxite
  - 08.DN With only large cations: 05 Natrophosphate, 10 Isoclasite, 15 Lermontovite, 20 Vyacheslavite
  - 08.DO With CO_{3}, SO_{4}, SiO_{4}: 05 Girvasite, 10 Voggite, 15 Peisleyite, 20 Perhamite, 25 Saryarkite-(Y), 30 Micheelsenite, 40 Parwanite, 45 Skorpionite
- 08.E Uranyl Phosphates
  - 08.EA UO_{2}:RO_{4} = 1:2: 05 Phosphowalpurgite, 10 Parsonsite, 15 Ulrichite, 20 Lakebogaite
  - 08.EB UO_{2}:RO_{4} = 1:1: 05 Autunite, 05 Uranocircite, 05 Torbernite, 05 Xiangjiangite, 05 Saleeite; 10 Bassetite, 10 Meta-autunite, 10 Metauranocircite, 10 Metatorbernite, 10 Lehnerite, 10 Przhevalskite; 15 Chernikovite, 15 Meta-ankoleite, 15 Uramphite; 20 Threadgoldite, 25 Uranospathite, 30 Vochtenite, 35 Coconinoite, 40 Ranunculite, 45 Triangulite, 50 Furongite, 55 Sabugalite
  - 08.EC UO_{2}:RO_{4} = 3:2: 05 Francoisite-(Ce), 05 Francoisite-(Nd), 05 Phuralumite, 05 Upalite; 10 Kivuite?, 10 Yingjiangite, 10 Renardite, 10 Dewindtite, 10 Phosphuranylite; 15 Dumontite; 20 Metavanmeersscheite, 20 Vanmeersscheite; 25 Althupite, 30 Mundite, 35 Phurcalite, 40 Bergenite
  - 08.ED Unclassified: 05 Moreauite, 10 Sreinite, 15 Kamitugaite
- 08.F Polyphosphates
  - 08.FA Polyphosphates, without OH and H_{2}O; dimers of corner-sharing RO_{4} tetrahedra: 20 Pyrocoproite*, 20 Pyrophosphite*
  - 08.FC Polyphosphates, with H_{2}O only: 10 Canaphite, 20 Arnhemite*, 25 Wooldridgeite, 30 Kanonerovite
- 08.X Unclassified Strunz Phosphates
  - 08.XX Unknown: 00 Sodium-autunite, 00 Pseudo-autunite*, 00 Cheralite-(Ce)?, 00 Laubmannite?, 00 Spodiosite?, 00 Sodium meta-autunite, 00 Kerstenite?, 00 Lewisite, 00 Coeruleolactite, 00 Viseite, 00 IMA2009-005
