= Althausite =

Magnesium phosphate mineral

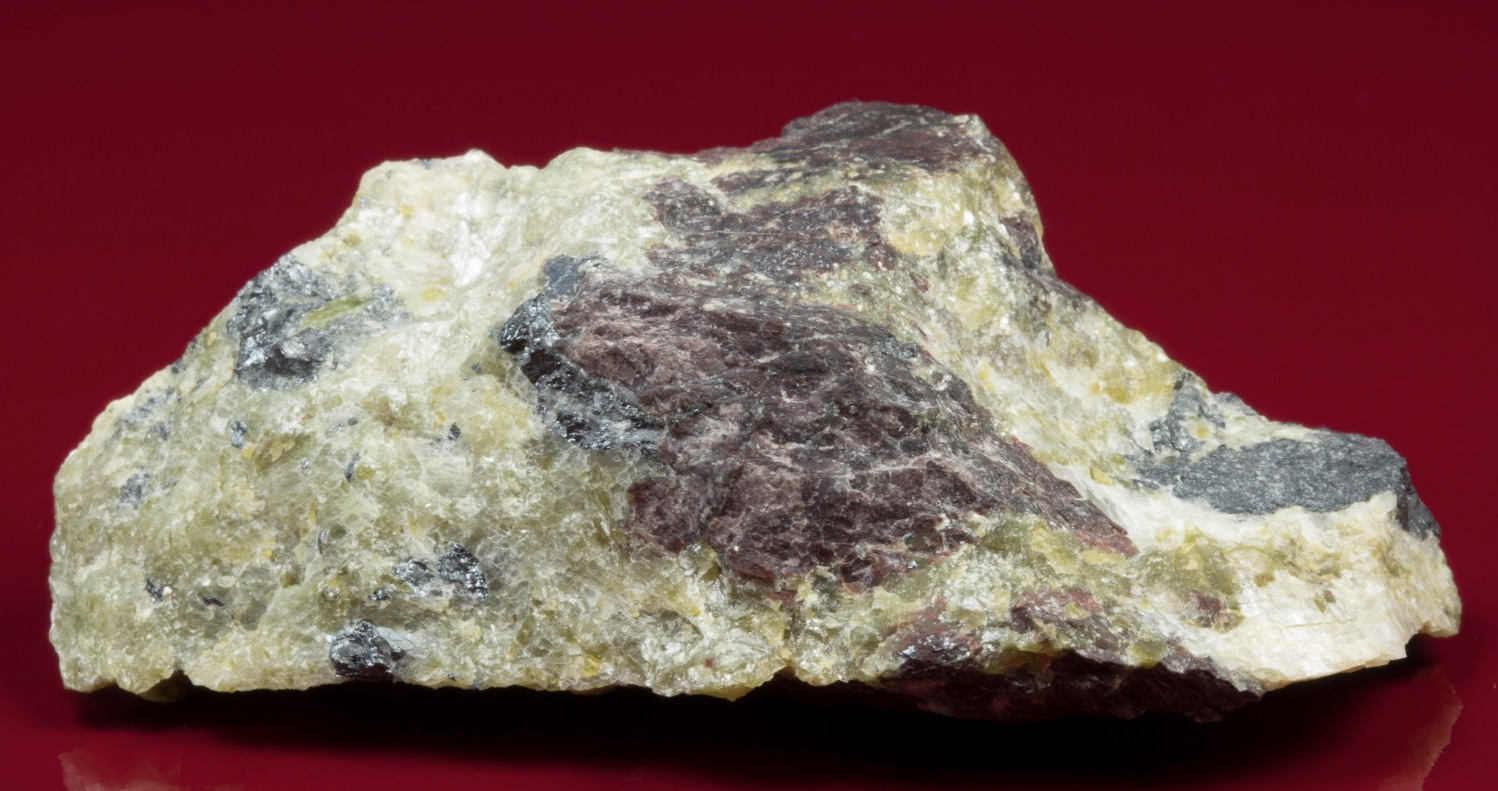
- Dark reddish brown, subhedral crystals of althausite in a serpentine-talc matrix with dark gray subhedral hematite crystals and greenish lizardite

General
- Category: Phosphate minerals
- Formula: Mg_{2}(PO_{4})(OH,F)
- IMA symbol: Ahs
- Strunz classification: 8.BB.25
- Crystal system: Orthorhombic
- Crystal class: Dipyramidal (mmm); H-M symbol: (2/m 2/m 2/m)
- Space group: Pnma

Identification

Althausite is a relatively simple magnesium phosphate mineral with formula Mg_{2}(PO_{4})(OH,F). It is very rare. Original occurrences are magnesite deposits among serpentinites. It is named after Egon Althaus (born 1933), a mineralogist at the University of Karlsruhe, Germany.
