= Xenophyllite =

Phosphate mineral

General
- Category: Phosphate minerals
- Formula: Na_{4}Fe_{7}(PO_{4})_{6}
- IMA symbol: Xp
- Strunz classification: 8.AC.50
- Crystal system: Triclinic; Unknown space group

Identification
- Formula mass: 1,052.72 g/mol
- Specific gravity: 4.72

Xenophyllite is a rare phosphate mineral with the chemical formula Na_{4}Fe_{7}(PO_{4})_{6}.

Xenophyllite was described for an occurrence in the Augustinovka meteorite, Dnipropetrovsk Oblast, Ukraine. It was approved by the IMA in 2006.
