= Nissonite =

Phosphate mineral

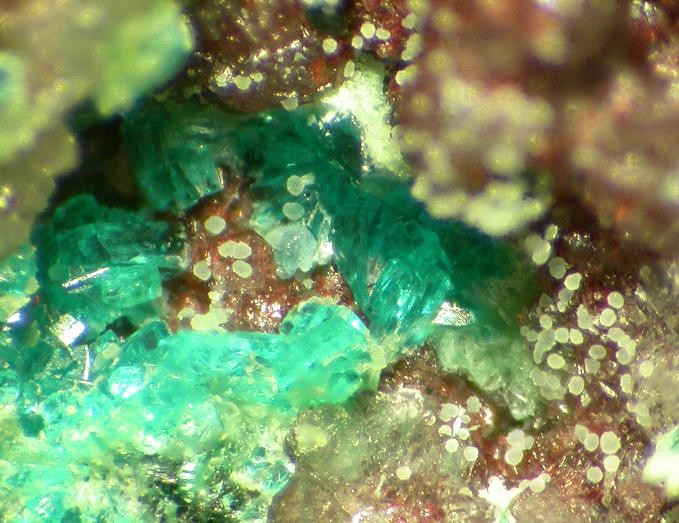
- Nissonite from Iron Monarch open cut, Iron Knob, Middleback Range, Eyre peninsula, South Australia, Australia

General
- Category: Phosphate mineral
- Formula: Cu_{2}Mg_{2}(PO_{4})_{2}(OH)_{2}·5H_{2}O
- IMA symbol: Nss
- Strunz classification: 8.DC.05
- Crystal system: Monoclinic
- Crystal class: Prismatic (2/m) (same H-M symbol)
- Space group: C2/c

Nissonite is a very rare copper phosphate mineral with the formula: Cu_{2}Mg_{2}(PO_{4})_{2}(OH)_{2}·5H_{2}O. It crystallizes in the monoclinic crystal system typically as crusts, tabular crystals, and diamond-shaped crystals. The color is blue-green. It has a light green streak, a Mohs hardness of 2.5 and a specific gravity of 2.73. Cleavage is {100} distinct.

Nissonite was discovered in 1966 and was named after William H. Nisson (1912–1965). It is from Llanada copper mine, near Llanada, San Benito Co., California.
