= Olgite =

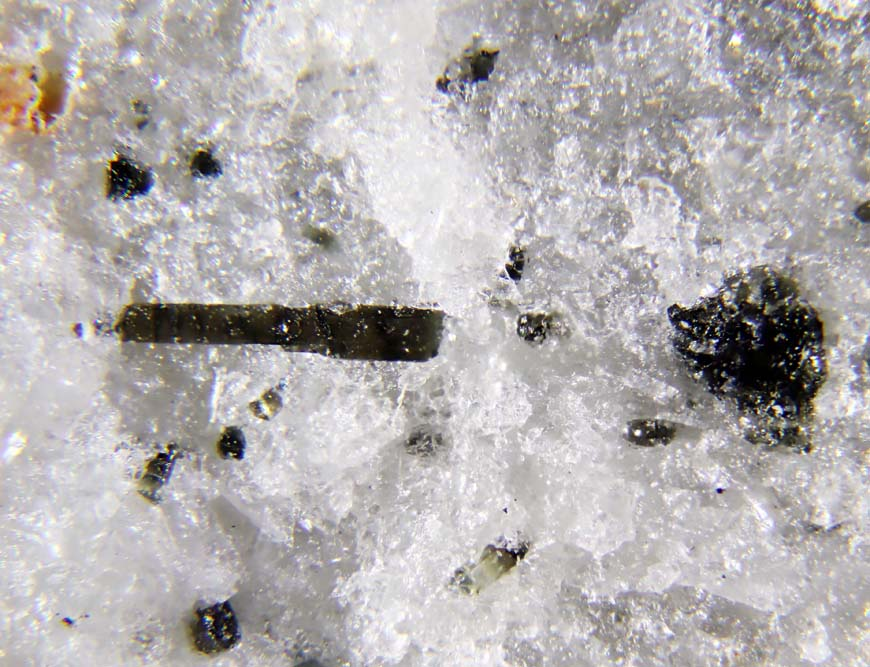
- Very dark green crystals of the rare phosphate mineral olgite from the type locality in Kola (Karnasurt Mountain, Lovozero Massif, Murmansk Oblast, Russian Federation)

General
- Category: Minerals
- Formula: Na(Sr,Ba)PO_{4}

Identification
- Color: Blue-green

Olgite is a rare blue-green colored phosphate mineral series that forms microscopic prismatic crystals that are trigonal in structure. Its chemical formula is Na(Sr,Ba)PO_{4}.

Olgite was discredited as a mineral name in 2008 by the International Mineralogical Association and is now the series name for bario-olgite and strontio-olgite (hypothetical mineral). The substance was named after Russian mineralogist Olga Anisimovne-Vorobiova (1902–1974).
