= Nevadaite =

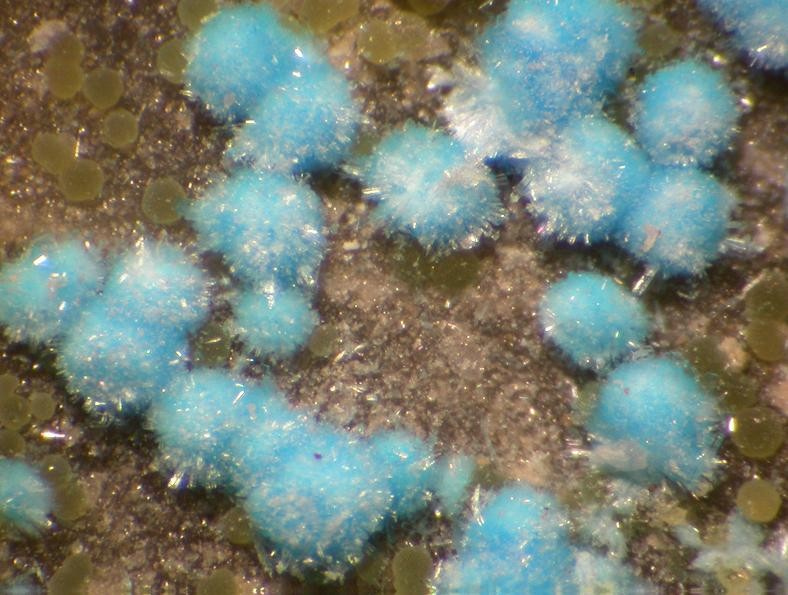
- Nevadaite - radial habit. Attribution: Leon Hupperichs

General
- Category: Phosphate minerals
- Formula: see text
- IMA symbol: Nev
- Strunz classification: 8.DC.60
- Crystal system: Orthorhombic
- Crystal class: Disphenoidal (222); H-M symbol: (222)
- Space group: P2_{1}mn
- Unit cell: a = 12.123 Å b = 18.999 Å c = 4.961 Å; Z = 1

Identification
- Color: Pale Green, turquoise
- Crystal habit: Acicular, crystalline, radial
- Cleavage: None
- Fracture: Conchoidal
- Mohs scale hardness: 3
- Luster: Vitreous
- Streak: pale blue
- Diaphaneity: Translucent
- Specific gravity: 2.54
- Optical properties: Biaxial (-)

Nevadaite is a rare phosphate mineral with a chemical formula of

Cu_{2}Zn_{0.02}V^{3+}_{0.98}Al_{1.15}Al_{8}P_{7.9}O_{32}F_{8.37}(OH)_{1.63}(H_{2}O)_{21.65}

== Characteristics ==
Nevadaite is a pale-green to turquoise colored mineral belonging to the phosphate group. It exhibits a radial crystal habit consisting of prismatic crystals covering areas up to 2 cm. It has a pale-blue streak, a vitreous luster, and is not fluorescent. Nevadaite is in the orthorhombic crystal system and displays conchoidal fracture.

== Location ==
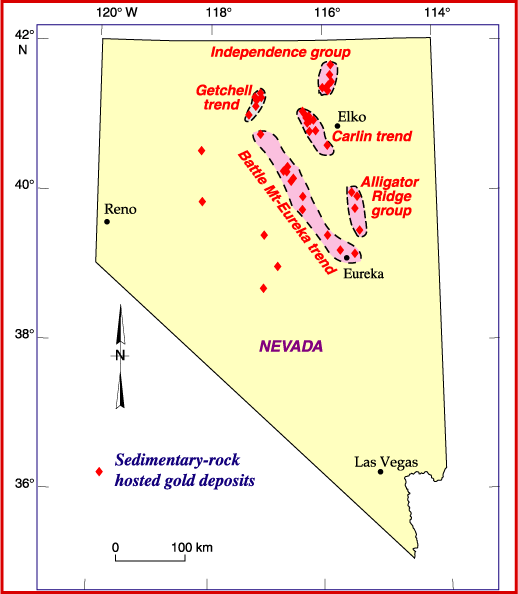

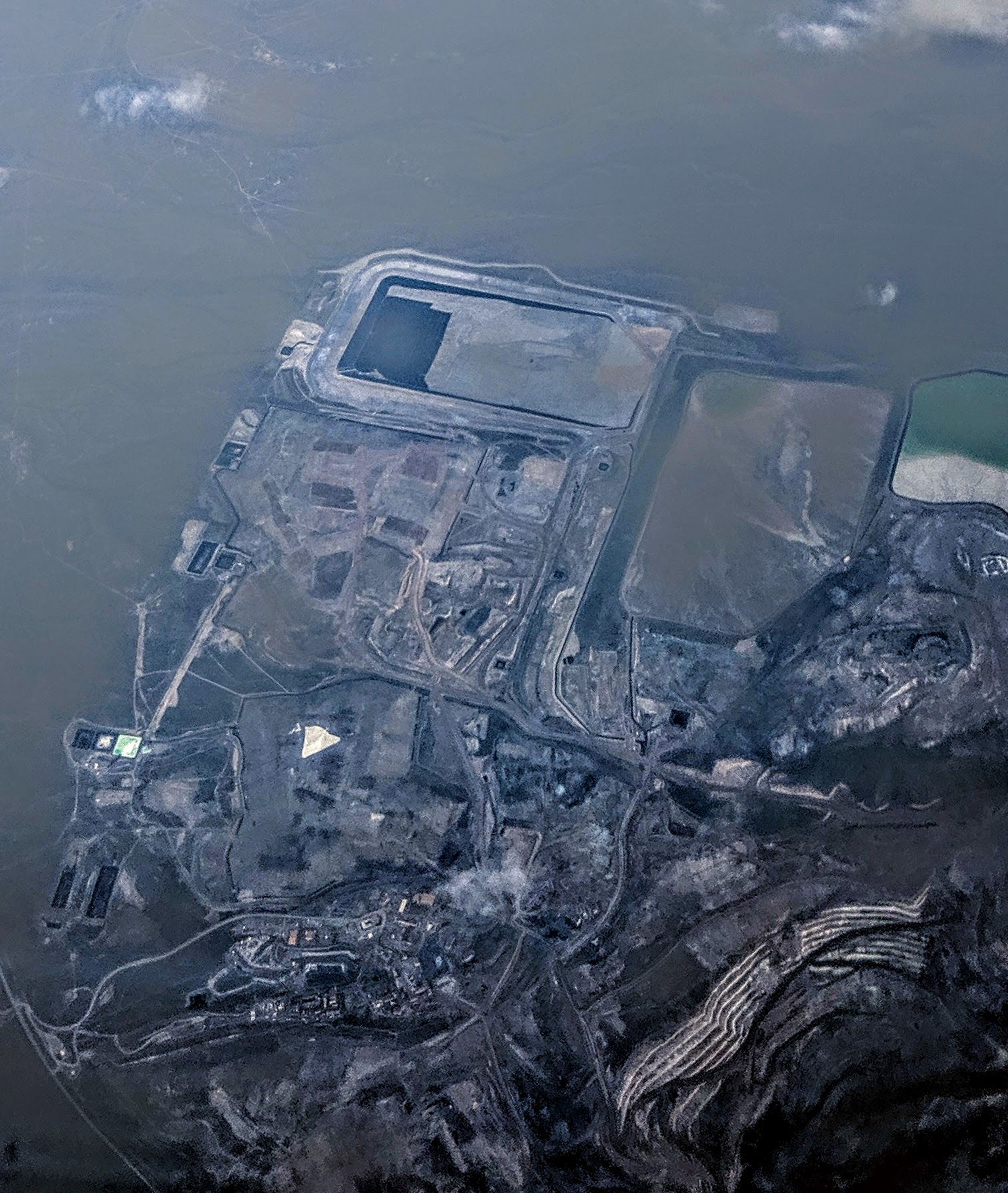
Hazy aerial view of Gold Quarry mine

Nevadaite was first discovered in the Gold Quarry mine near the town of Carlin, Eureka County, Nevada. The unique conditions and amounts of phosphate, vanadate, arsenate, and uranate in this area led to the formation of two new minerals; one being nevadaite and the other being goldquarryite. The Gold Quarry mine has been operated by The Newmont Mining Corporation since 1985 for the extraction of Carlin-type gold deposits.

Nevadaite was discovered in February 1992 by Martin C. Jensen and was approved by the International Mineralogical Association in 2002. It is also found in a copper mine in Kyrgyzstan.
