= Cheralite =

Anhydrous phosphate mineral

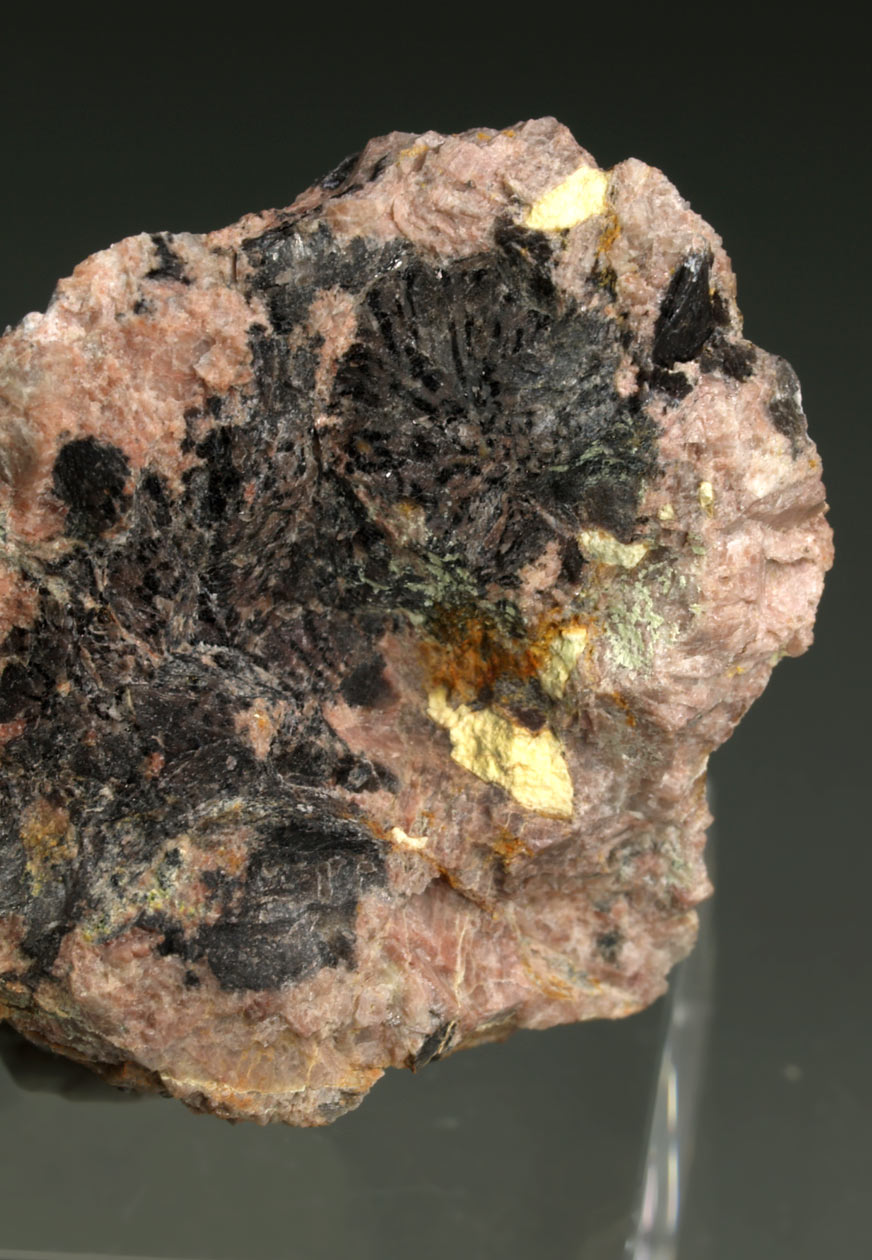

Cheralite is an anhydrous phosphate mineral with the ideal chemical formula CaTh(PO_{4})_{2}. It is isomorphous with huttonite and monazite. It can be regarded as the product of the complete cationic substitution in the system:

2 LREE^{3+} ↔ Ca^{2+} + Th^{4+}.

It was previously known under the name brabantite.

Physical properties:

Property	Value
Lustre	Vitreous
Description	Dull or greasy
Colour	Grayish brown to reddish brown (on rims), pale yellow, brownish green
Hardness	5 on Mohs scale
Density	4.72 - 5.02 g/cm^{3}
