= Grayite =

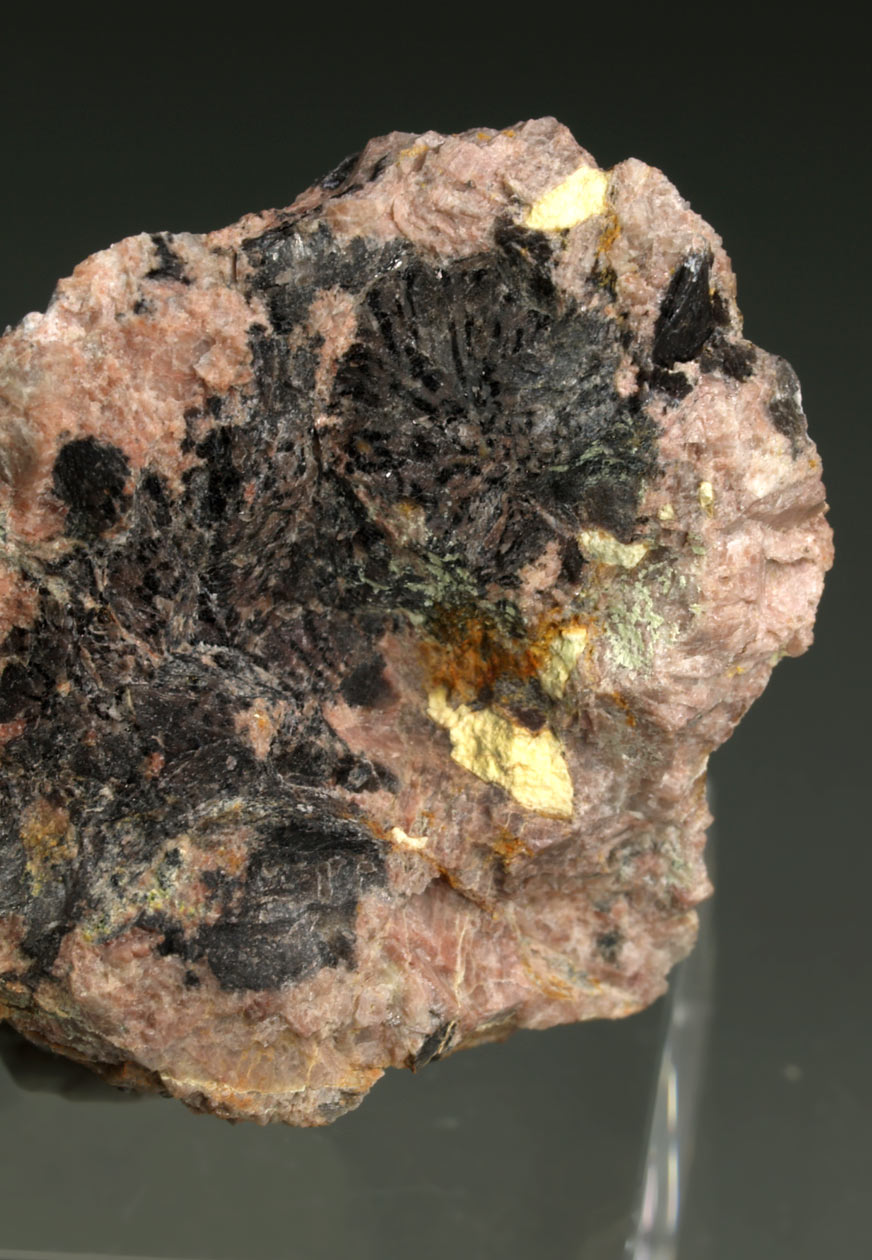

General
- Category: Phosphate minerals Rhabdophane group
- Formula: (Th,Pb,Ca)PO_{4}·(H_{2}O)
- IMA symbol: Gry
- Strunz classification: 8.C.J.45
- Dana classification: 40.04.07.04
- Crystal system: Hexagonal
- Crystal class: Trapezohedral (622) (same H-M symbol)
- Space group: P6_{2}22 or P6_{4}22
- Unit cell: a = 6.957 c = 6.396 [Å]; Z = 3

Identification
- Color: Pale yellow, yellow, yellowish gray, often a dark reddish brown
- Crystal habit: Cryptocrystalline Aggregate
- Mohs scale hardness: 3–4
- Luster: Resinous to waxy to greasy
- Diaphaneity: Semitransparent
- Density: 6.41 g/cm^{3} (calculated)
- Optical properties: Uniaxial
- Refractive index: n_{α} = 1.66 n_{β} = 1.69
- Birefringence: Moderate with max at δ = 1.660
- Ultraviolet fluorescence: May fluoresce green or yellow under short wave UV
- Other characteristics: Radioactive

Grayite, ThPO_{4}·(H_{2}O), is a thorium phosphate mineral of the Rabdophane group first discovered in 1957 by S.H.U. Bowie in Rhodesia. It is of moderate hardness occurring occasionally in aggregates of hexagonal crystals occasionally but more commonly in microgranular/cryptocrystalline masses. Due to its thorium content, grayite displays some radioactivity although it is only moderate and the mineral displays powder XRD peaks without any metamict-like effects. The color of grayite is most commonly observed as a light to dark reddish brown but has also been observed as lighter yellows with grayish tints. It has a low to moderate hardness with a Mohs hardness of 3–4 and has a specific gravity of 3.7–4.3. It has been found in both intrusive igneous and sedimentary environments.

== Occurrence ==
Formations including grayite were originally documented in Rhodesia (now Zimbabwe) in 1957 and subsequently around the globe. Some of these locales include the states of Wyoming and Colorado as well as Madagascar. Grayite has often been found in pegmatitic environments amongst other thorium minerals, particularly monazite ((Ce,La)PO_{4}). Recent work has shown widespread occurrences in Wisconsin pegmatitic environments. Other notable finds of pegmatitic grayite occur in Bulgaria. Grayite has also been found in sedimentary environments with an observation of high concentrations in cracks raising the possibility of the mineral as a precipitate from fluid mobilized ions. Formation of grayite and other rhabdophane minerals in this context has been documented in literature.

== As member of rhabdophane group ==
Grayite is isostructural with members of the Rhabdophane group such as brockite and rhabdrophane. While previous work has identified grayite as a pseudohexagonal orthorhombic member of the rhabdophane group along with ningyoite, more contemporary work seems to maintain a hexagonal crystal structure. These hydrated phosphate minerals often include radioactive elements such as thorium, uranium, and cerium. Powder XRD analysis produces peaks matching those of rhabdophane.

== Relationship with monazite ==
In the identification of new hydrated phosphate minerals related to rhabdophane XRD peak information is usually recorded through different sample preparation methods. Besides standard powder XRD, samples are often heated to ~850 °C so that the structure changes. The peak information is analyzed again and upon doing this hydrated thorium phosphate minerals will show a monazite-like structure indicating a possible alteration relationship.

== See also ==
- Classification of minerals
- List of minerals
