= Hagendorfite =

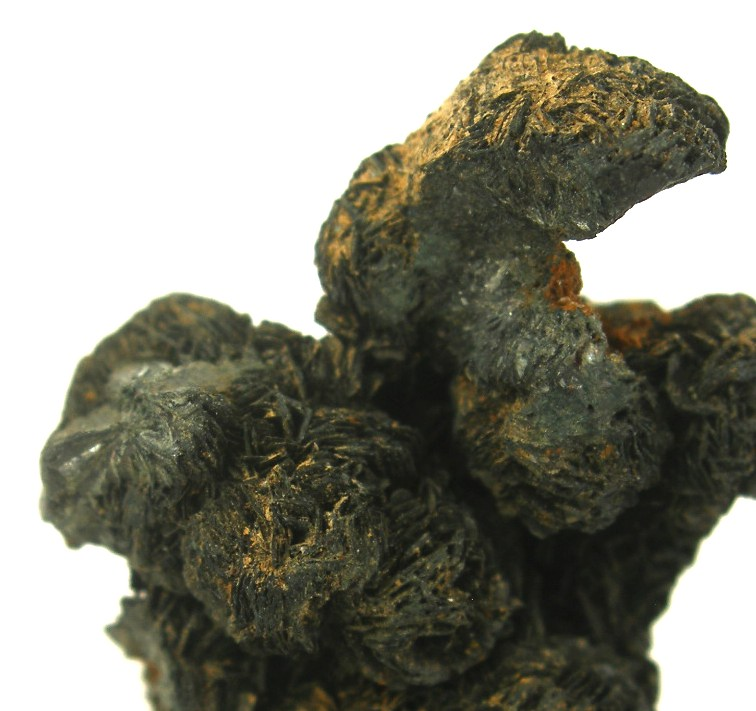

General
- Category: Iron phosphate minerals
- Formula: (Na,Ca)MnFe_{2}(PO_{4})_{3}
- IMA symbol: Hag
- Strunz classification: 8.AC.10
- Crystal system: Monoclinic
- Crystal class: Prismatic (2/m) (same H-M symbol)
- Space group: C2/c
- Unit cell: a = 11.9721(9) Å b = 12.5988(8) Å c = 6.5029(5) Å β = 114.841(8)°, Z = 4

Identification
- Color: Greenish-black
- Crystal habit: Massive – uniformly indistinguishable crystals forming large masses.
- Cleavage: {001} good, {110} poor
- Mohs scale hardness: 3.5
- Streak: Gray green
- Diaphaneity: Translucent
- Specific gravity: 3.71
- Optical properties: Biaxial (-)
- Refractive index: n_{α} = 1.735 n_{β} = 1.742 n_{γ} = 1.745
- Birefringence: 0.0100
- Pleochroism: (x): Yellowish brown (y): green (z): bluish green
- 2V angle: Measured: 68° to 70°

Hagendorfite is an iron phosphate mineral with the chemical formula of (Na,Ca)MnFe_{2}(PO_{4})_{3} and is named after where the mineral was discovered, Hagendorf-Süd, Bavaria, Germany.

Hagendorfite is in the monoclinic crystal class; the mineral's internal symmetry consists of three axes with unequal length. Furthermore, the angles between two of the axes is 90° while the other angle is less than 90°. Monoclinic minerals contain a twofold rotation axis where they can be rotated 360° and have the crystal face repeat every 180°. They also have the characteristic mirror plane, which can produce a perfect mirror image when divided in two.

Hagendorfite belongs to the monoclinic crystal class, so it is assigned to the biaxial optical class. Hagendorfite's optic sign, which is negative, is proven by examining its interference figure. Biaxial minerals, including Hagendorfite, have three indices of refraction which may or may not correspond with the mineral's unequally lengthened axes. A refractive index will provide the ratio of the speed of light in vacuum with the speed of light in the mineral. A single refractive index is given when two rays of light vibrate in the mineral's circular section and move along the optic axes.

== Occurrence ==
The mineral is found in various locations around the world. Hagendorfite occurs in complex granite course-grained rocks called pegmatites or in the phosphate nodules in shale. Although hagendorfite was first discovered in Bavaria, Germany, it has since been found in the Southern Province in Rwanda, the Sowie Mountains in Poland, and New Hampshire in the US. Hagendorfite is of interest to mineralogists researching phosphate-bearing pegmatites or the dickinsonite series. Hagendorfite is associated with the dickinsonite series and with other mineral members including varulite, alluarrdite, and manganalluaudite.
