= Vantasselite =

Phosphate mineral

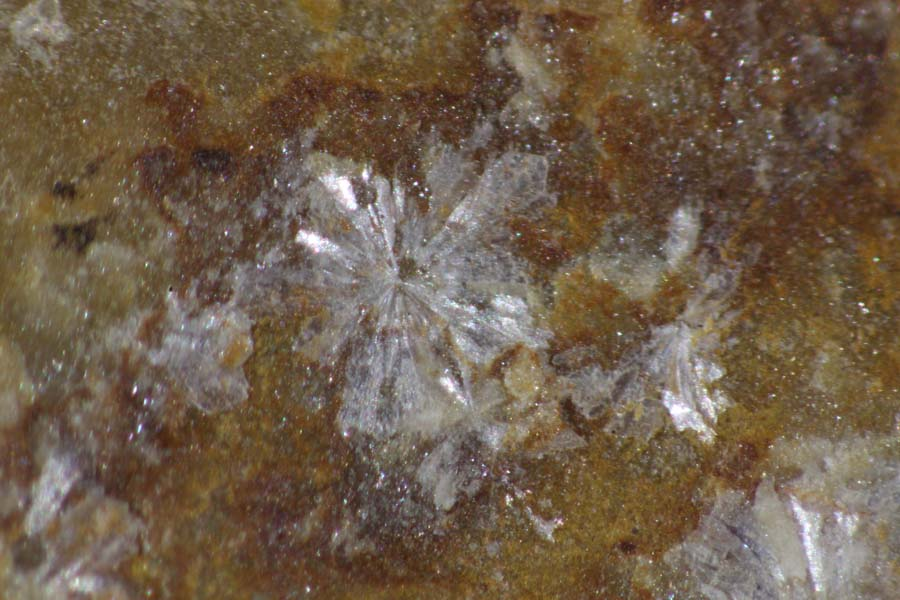
- Vantasselite, from Bihain, Vielsalm, Luxembourg Province, Belgium

General
- Category: Phosphate minerals
- Formula: Al_{4}(PO_{4})_{3}(OH)_{3} •9H_{2}O
- IMA symbol: Vts
- Strunz classification: 8.DC.37
- Crystal system: Orthorhombic; Unknown space group
- Unit cell: a = 10.52 Å, b = 16.54 Å c = 20.37 Å; Z = 8

Identification
- Color: white
- Luster: pearly

Vantasselite is a rare aluminium phosphate mineral with formula: Al_{4}(PO_{4})_{3}(OH)_{3} •9H_{2}O. It crystallizes in the orthorhombic system and has a white color, a hardness of 2 to 2.5, a white streak and a pearly luster.

It occurs in a quartzite quarry north of Bihain, Belgium It was first described in 1987 and named after Belgian mineralogist René Van Tassel.
