= Samuelsonite =

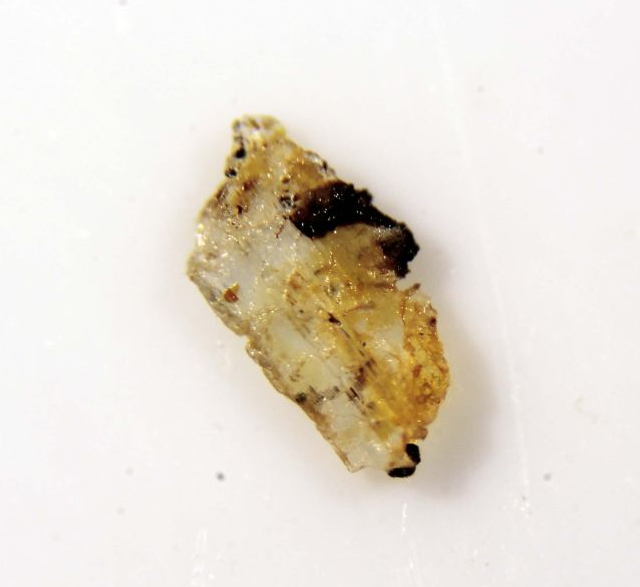

General
- Category: Phosphate minerals
- Formula: (Ca,Ba)Ca_{8}Fe_{2}^{2+}Mn_{2}^{2+}Al_{2}[(OH)_{2}(PO_{4})_{10}]
- IMA symbol: Sms
- Strunz classification: 8.BF.10
- Crystal system: Monoclinic
- Crystal class: Prismatic (2/m) (same H-M symbol)
- Space group: C2/m
- Unit cell: a= 18.495 Å, b= 6.805 Å c= 14.000 Å, β= 112.75°; Z = 2

Identification
- Color: Pale yellow
- Crystal habit: Prismatic crystals, elongated and striated
- Cleavage: Fair on {001}
- Mohs scale hardness: 5
- Luster: Adamantine, Sub-Adamantine
- Streak: White
- Diaphaneity: Transparent
- Specific gravity: 3.353
- Optical properties: Biaxial (+)
- Refractive index: nα = 1.645 - 1.648 nβ = 1.650 - 1.655 nγ = 1.655 - 1.667
- Birefringence: 0.0100-0.0190

Samuelsonite is a complex mineral that is found near North Groton, Grafton County, New Hampshire, US. Additionally, it is most commonly found as a secondary mineral in granite pegmatite. Samuelsonite is named after Peter B. Samuelson, a prospector from Rumney, New Hampshire.

The mineral has a pale yellow color and has a hardness of 5 on Mohs scale. The crystal is generally yellow, flat, and with straited crystals and blue trolleites. Samuelsonite is monoclinic. There are three vectors of unequal length in this crystal system. The three vectors form a rectangular prism with a parallelogram at the base. Therefore, two of the vectors are perpendicular, while the third makes an angle that is not equal to 90°. Samuelsonite has biaxial birefringence (trirefringence), meaning when light passes through the optic axis it is split into two rays due to the difference in refractive index of the ray with parallel polarized light compared to the ray with perpendicular polarized light.
