= Montgomeryite =

Phosphate mineral

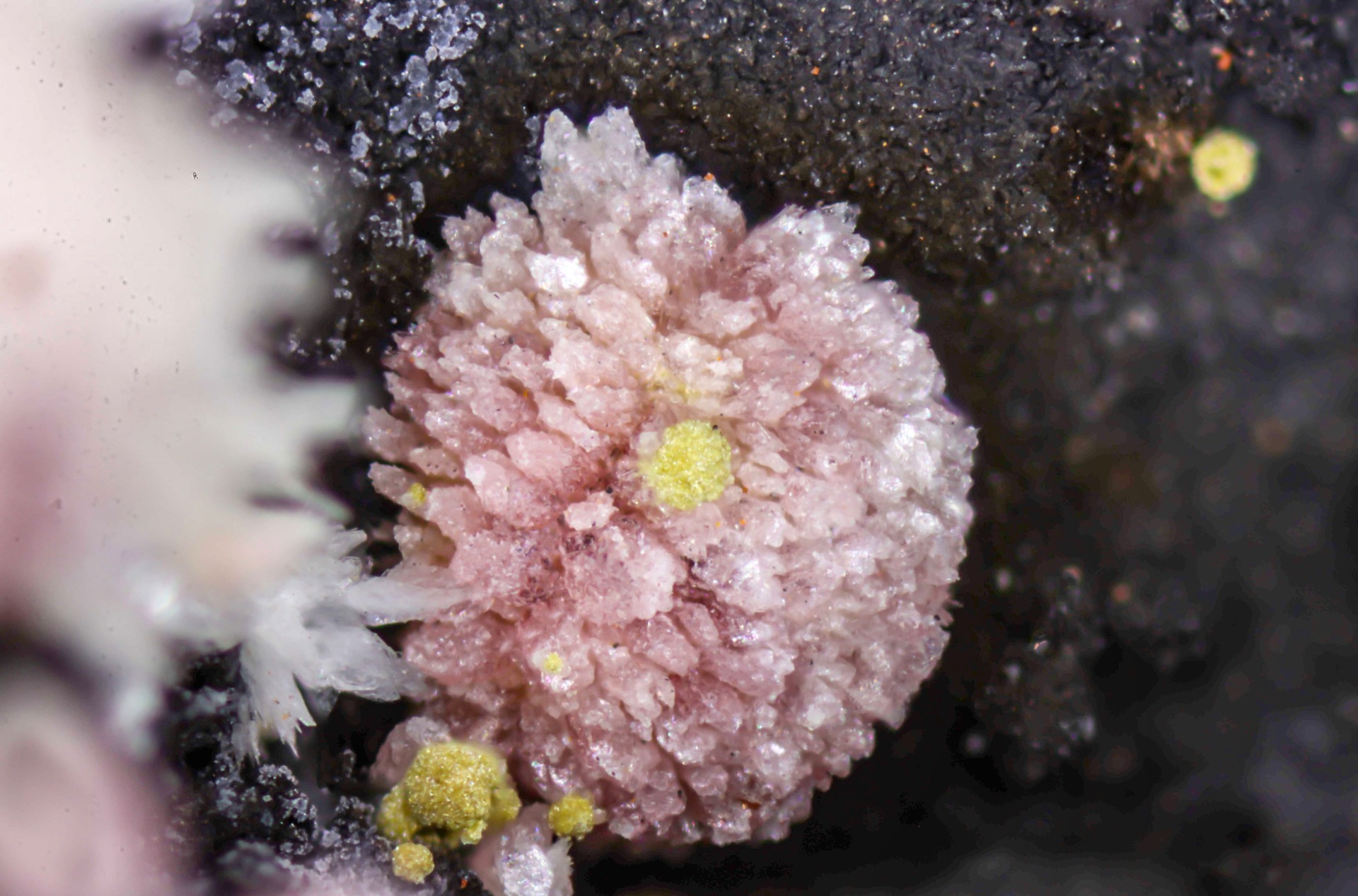
- Montgomeryite found in South Australia

General
- Category: Phosphate mineral
- Formula: Ca_{4}MgAl_{4}(PO_{4})_{6}(OH)_{4}·12H_{2}O
- IMA symbol: Mgm

Identification
- Color: Dark green to light green, colorless, red, yellow
- Mohs scale hardness: 4

Montgomeryite is a phosphate mineral with the chemical formula Ca_{4}MgAl_{4}(PO_{4})_{6}(OH)_{4}·12H_{2}O. The mineral was discovered in Fairfield, Utah in a variscite nodule. Montgomeryite is a very rare mineral and can only be found in a few places in the world.
