= Allanpringite =

Phosphate mineral

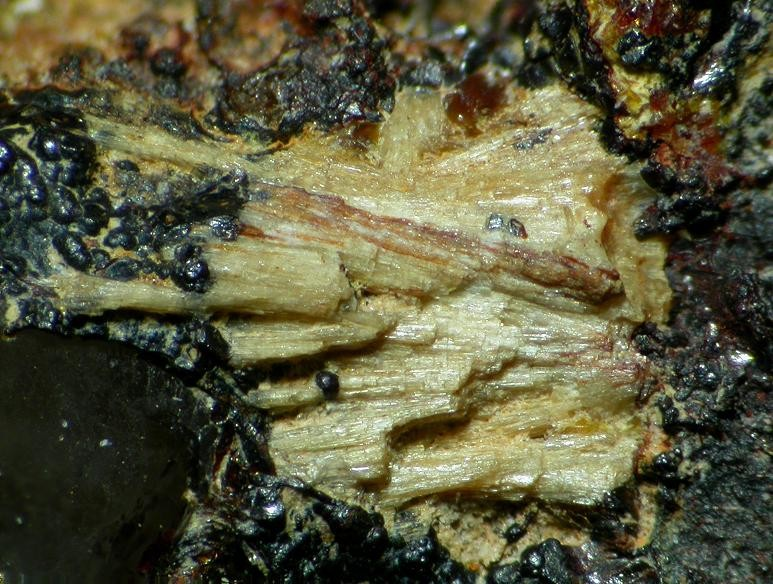
- Picture width 4 mm

General
- Category: Phosphate mineral
- Formula: Fe^{3+}_{3}(PO_{4})_{2}(OH)_{3}·5H_{2}O
- IMA symbol: Apg
- Strunz classification: 8.DC.50
- Dana classification: 42.10.02.02
- Crystal system: Monoclinic
- Crystal class: Prismatic (2/m) (same H-M symbol)
- Space group: P2_{1}/n
- Unit cell: a = 9.777, b = 7.358 c = 17.83 [Å]; β = 92.19°; Z = 4

Identification
- Formula mass: 498.07 g/mol
- Color: Pale brownish yellow
- Crystal habit: Acicular
- Cleavage: {hk0} perfect, {010} good
- Fracture: Irregular/uneven
- Tenacity: Brittle
- Mohs scale hardness: 3
- Luster: Vitreous
- Streak: Pale yellowish white
- Diaphaneity: Translucent to transparent
- Specific gravity: 2.54 (meas.), 2.583 (calc.)
- Optical properties: Biaxial (+)
- Refractive index: n_{α} = 1.662 n_{β} = 1.675 n_{γ} = 1.747
- Birefringence: 0.085
- 2V angle: 48° (calc.)

Allanpringite is a phosphate mineral that was named after the Australian mineralogist, Allan Pring of the South Australian Museum.

Allanpringite is a Fe^{3+} analogue of the Al-phosphate mineral wavellite, but it has a different crystal symmetry – monoclinic instead of orthorhombic in wavellite.

It forms needle-like crystals, which are always twinned and form parallel bundles up to about 2 mm long. They are often found in association with other iron phosphates in abandoned iron mines.
