= Divino das Laranjeiras =

Coordinates: 18°46′S 41°29′W

- Municipality
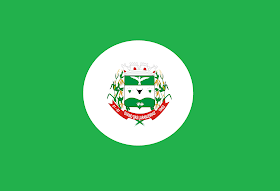
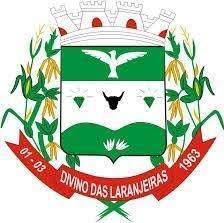
- Flag Coat of arms
- Interactive map of Divino das Laranjeiras
- Country: Brazil
- Region: Southeast
- State: Minas Gerais
- Mesoregion: Vale do Rio Doce

Population (2022 Census)
  - Total: 4,178
  - Estimate (2025): 4,147
- Time zone: UTC−3 (BRT)

Divino das Laranjeiras is a municipality in the state of Minas Gerais in the Southeast region of Brazil.

== See also ==
- List of municipalities in Minas Gerais
