= Faustite =

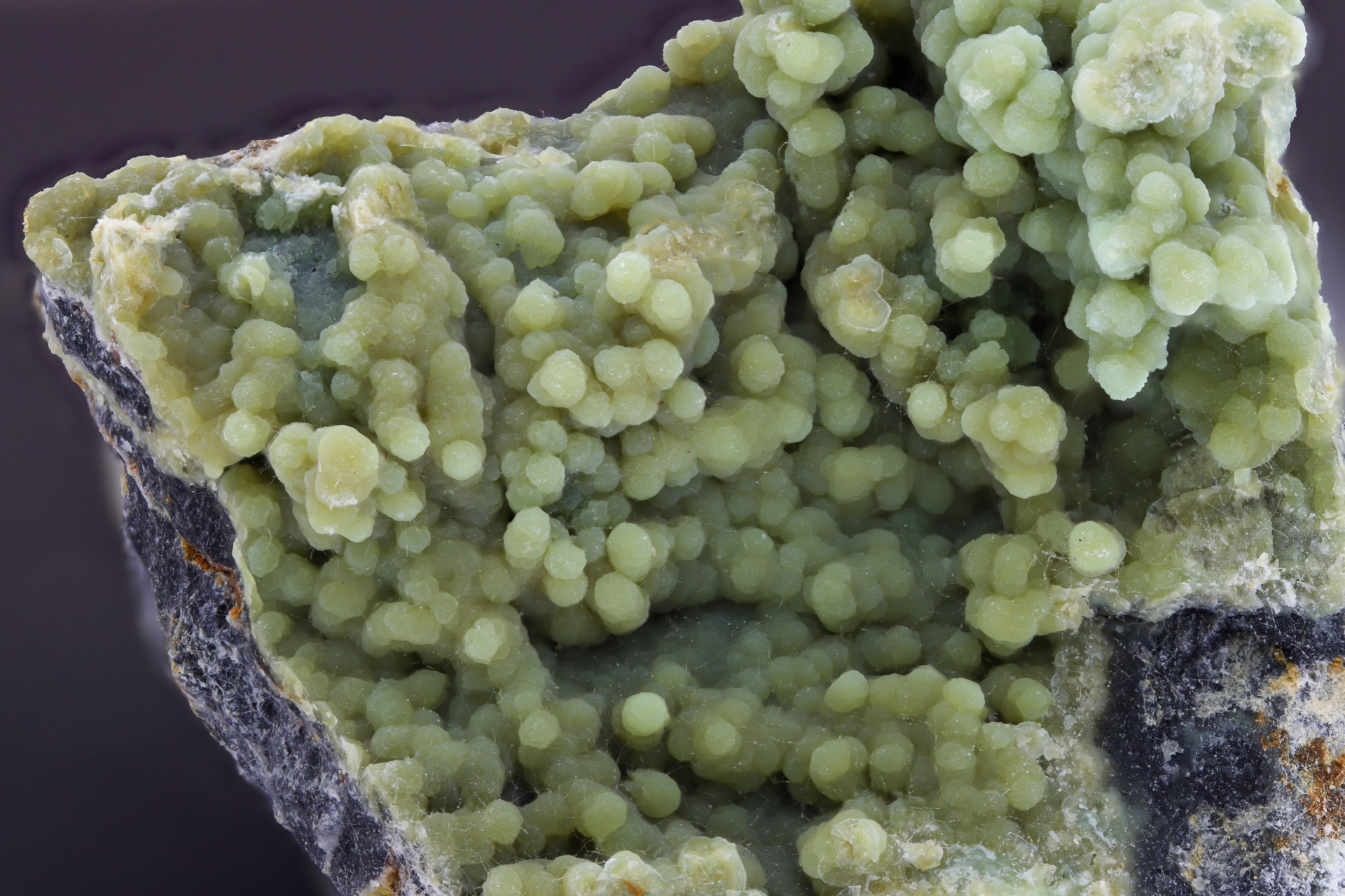
A sample of faustite from Malaysia, Pahang, Ampang Jaleh, Penjom Mine

The IMA-approved mineral faustite is a member of the triclinic turquoise group of hydrous phosphates with the chemical composition ZnAl_{6}(PO_{4})_{4}(OH)_{8}·4H_{2}O. It is named after the American mineralogist and petrologist Dr. George Tobias Faust, who workes with the U.S. Geological Survey (USGS).

Some divalent copper generally replaces the zinc position. Faustite is the zinc-rich analogue of turquoise, having almost four times as much zinc than copper in its crystal structure. Trivalent (ferric) iron may replace some of the aluminum. Minor amounts of calcium may also be present. It has a hardness of 4.5–5.5 on the Mohs scale of mineral hardness, and aside from having a slightly lower hardness, it may be difficult to distinguish it from turquoise in hand specimens.

Faustite has a blue-green to apple green color in polished cabochons. It may be presented as a turquoise imitation and also be treated with stabilizers for jewelry making.
