= Aldermanite =

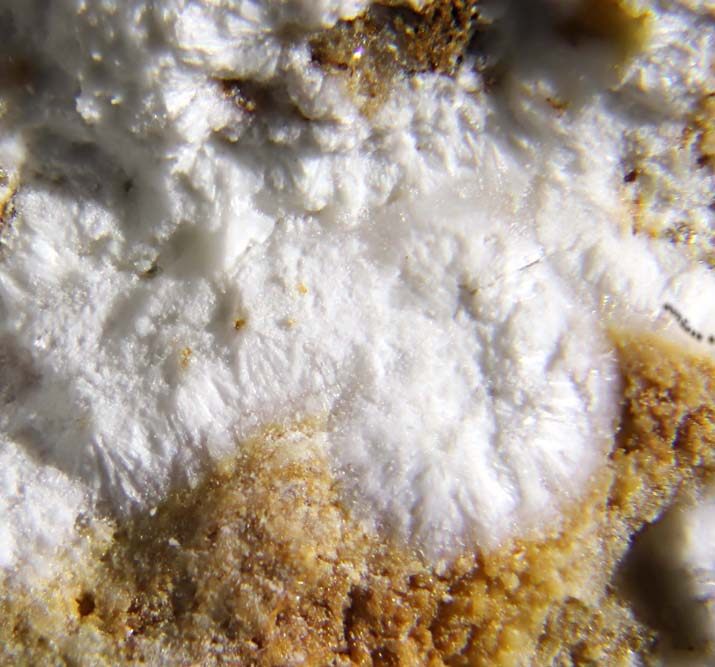

General
- Category: Phosphate minerals
- Formula: [Mg(H_{2}O)_{6}][Na(H_{2}O)_{2}Al_{3}(PO_{4})_{2}(OH,F)_{6} · H_{2}O
- IMA symbol: Adm
- Crystal system: Monoclinic
- Crystal class: 2/m - Prismatic

Identification
- Color: Colorless
- Tenacity: Brittle
- Mohs scale hardness: 2
- Luster: Sub-vitreous, pearly
- Density: 2.1 g cm^{−1} (calculated)

Aldermanite is a rare hydrated phosphate mineral with formula Mg_{5}Al_{12}(PO_{4})_{8}(OH)_{22}·32H_{2}O. It is named after Arthur Richard Alderman (1901–1980), Professor of Geology and Mineralogy, University of Adelaide. Its type locality is Moculta Phosphate Quarry (Klemm's Quarry), Angaston, Barossa Valley, North Mount Lofty Ranges, Mount Lofty Ranges, South Australia, Australia.
