= Crandallite =

Calcium aluminium basic phosphate mineral

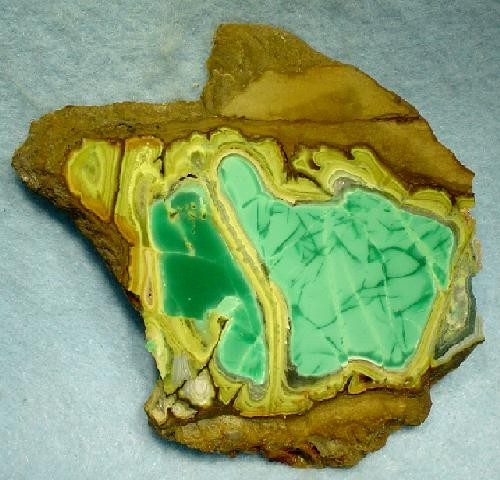
- Variscite and crandallite. Locality: Little Green Monster Variscite Mine, Clay Canyon, Fairfield, Oquirrh Mountains, Utah County, Utah, US. Size: 7.8 × 7.3 × 0.4 cm.

General
- Category: Phosphate minerals
- Formula: CaAl_{3}(PO_{4})_{2}(OH)_{5}·H_{2}O
- IMA symbol: Cdl
- Strunz classification: 8.BL.10
- Dana classification: 42.07.03.01
- Crystal system: Trigonal
- Unit cell: a = 7.005, c = 16.192, Z = 3; V = 688.09

Identification
- Formula mass: 414.02
- Colour: grey; yellowish
- Crystal habit: fibrous, compact or massive
- Cleavage: perfect 0001
- Mohs scale hardness: 4
- Luster: vitreous to dull
- Streak: white
- Density: 2.84
- Refractive index: w = 1.618, e = 1.623
- Birefringence: 0.0050

Crandallite is a calcium aluminium basic phosphate mineral. It has ideal formula CaAl_{3}(PO_{4})_{2}(OH)_{5}·H_{2}O. Crandallite was named after Milan L. Crandall Jr, who worked for Knight Syndicate. This mineral is found in laterite and in alteration products of phosphate rich pegmatites.
