= Leucophosphite =

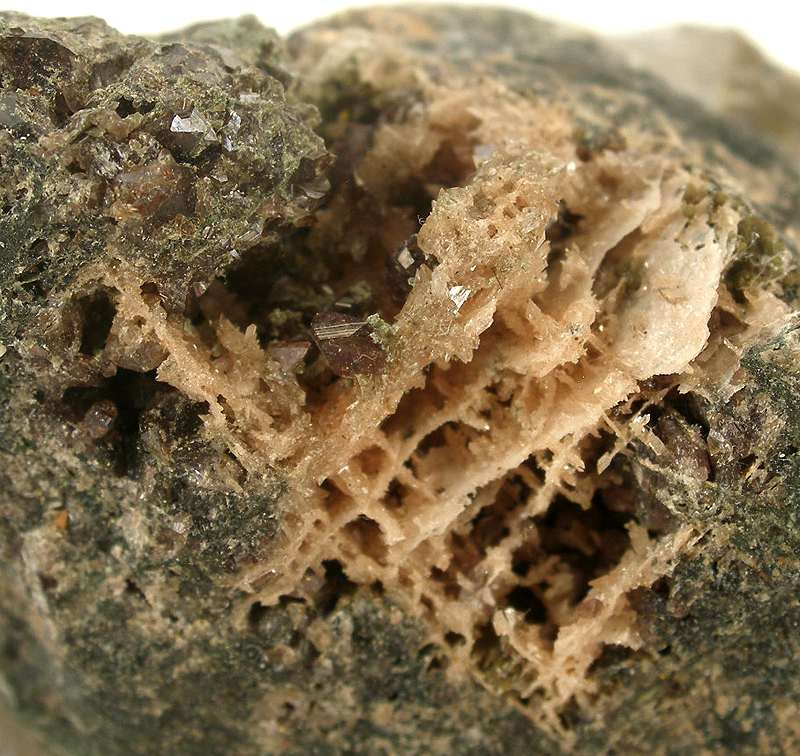
- Hureaulite, leucophosphite. Locality: White Elephant Mine, Cicero Peak, Pringle, Custer District, Custer County, South Dakota, US (Locality at mindat.org). Size: small cabinet, 9.8 × 5.4 × 3.4 cm.

General
- Category: Phosphate mineral
- Formula: KFe^{+3}_{2}(PO_{4})_{2}(OH)·2H_{2}O
- IMA symbol: Lpp

Identification
- Color: White to greenish, buff, yellow-brown, orange-brown, pink, greenish brown, brownish purple
- Fracture: Monoclinic
- Mohs scale hardness: 3.5

Leucophosphite is a phosphatic mineral derived from guano (bird or bat excrement).
