= List of minerals recognized by the International Mineralogical Association (P–Q) =

This list includes those recognised minerals beginning with the letters P and Q. The International Mineralogical Association is the international group that recognises new minerals and new mineral names; however, minerals discovered before 1959 did not go through the official naming procedure, although some minerals published previously have been either confirmed or discredited since that date. This list contains a mixture of mineral names that have been approved since 1959 and those mineral names believed to still refer to valid mineral species (these are called "grandfathered" species).

The list is divided into groups:

- Introduction • (Main synonyms)
- A • B • C • D • E • F • G • H • I • J • K • L • M • N • O • P–Q • R • S • T • U–V • W–X • Y–Z

The data was exported from mindat.org on 29 April 2005; updated up to 'IMA2021'.

The minerals are sorted by name, followed by the structural group (rruff.info/ima and ima-cnmnc by mineralienatlas.de, mainly) or chemical class (mindat.org and basics), the year of publication (if it's before of an IMA approval procedure), the IMA approval and the Strunz-mindat code. The first link is to mindat.org, the second link is to webmineral.com, and the third is to the Handbook of Mineralogy (Mineralogical Society of America).

- Abbreviations:
  - ^{D} – discredited (IMA/CNMNC status).
  - ^{Q} – questionable/ doubtful (IMA/CNMNC, mindat.org or mineralienatlas.de status).
  - ^{N} – published without approval of the IMA/CNMNC, or just not an IMA approved mineral but with some acceptance in the scientific community nowadays.
  - ^{I} – intermediate member of a solid-solution series.
  - ^{H} – hypothetical mineral (synthetic, anthropogenic, suspended approval procedure, etc.)
    - ^{ch} – incomplete description, hypothetical solid solution end member.
  - Rd – redefinition of ...
  - "s.p." – special procedure.
  - group – a name used to designate a group of species, sometimes only a mineral group name.
  - no – no link available.
  - IUPAC – chemical name.
  - Y: NNNN – year of publication.
  - Y: old – known before publications were available.

== P ==
=== Pa ===
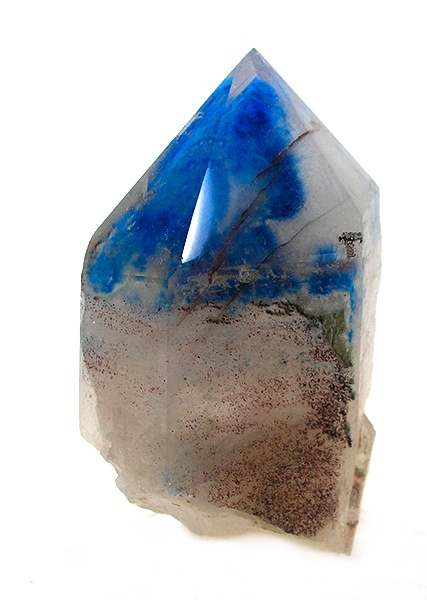
Papagoite in quartz, Messina mine, Musina, South Africa, size 7 x 4.2 x 4.1 cm

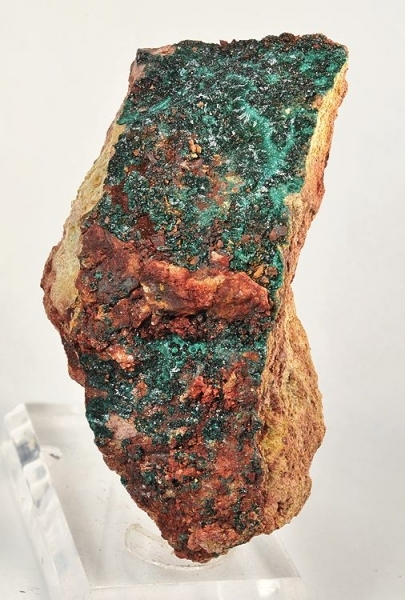
Paratacamite on rhyolite, San Francisco Mine, Tocopilla Province, Chile, size: 10.2 x 5.0 x 3.1 cm

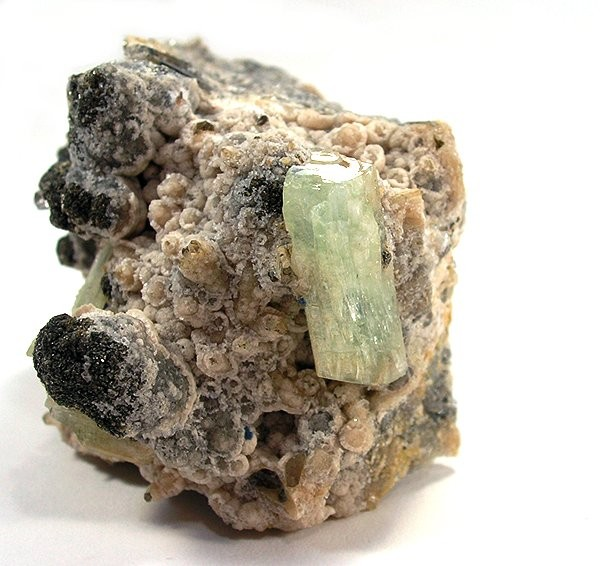
Paravauxite, Siglo Veinte Mine, Llallagua, Rafael Bustillo Province, Potosí Department, Bolivia

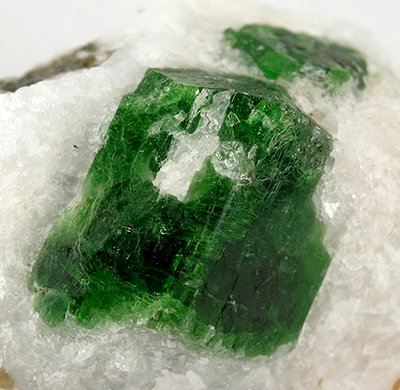
Pargasite on marble, Gilgit District, Pakistan. Large crystal is about 2 x 2 cm.

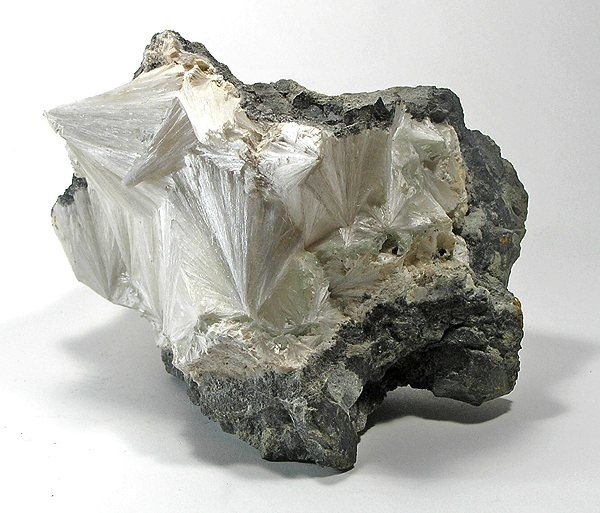
Pectolite from Paterson, Passaic County, New Jersey, USA

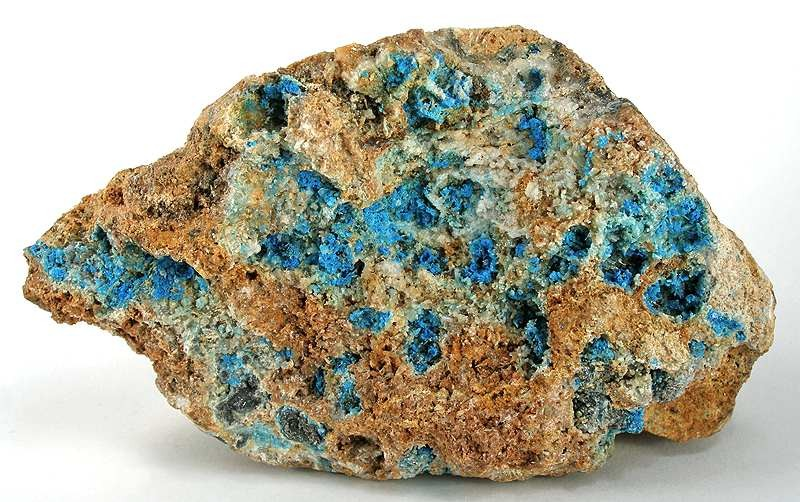
Penfieldite from Sierra Gorda District, Tocopilla Province, Antofagasta Region, Chile

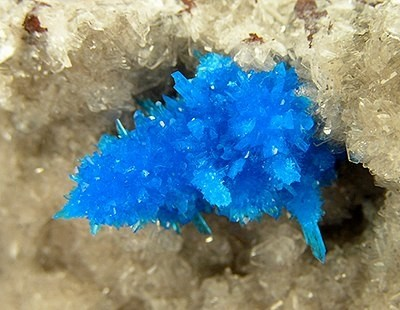
Pentagonite, Wagholi, Pune District, India. Christmas tree-shaped cluster is 1.7 cm long.

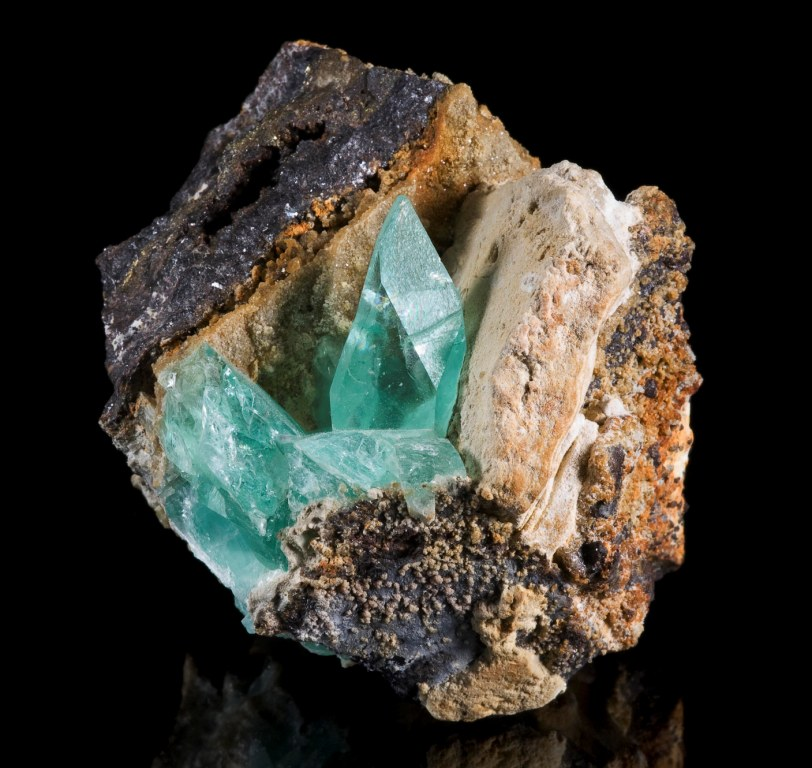
Phosphophyllite crystal perched in a protected matrix cavity

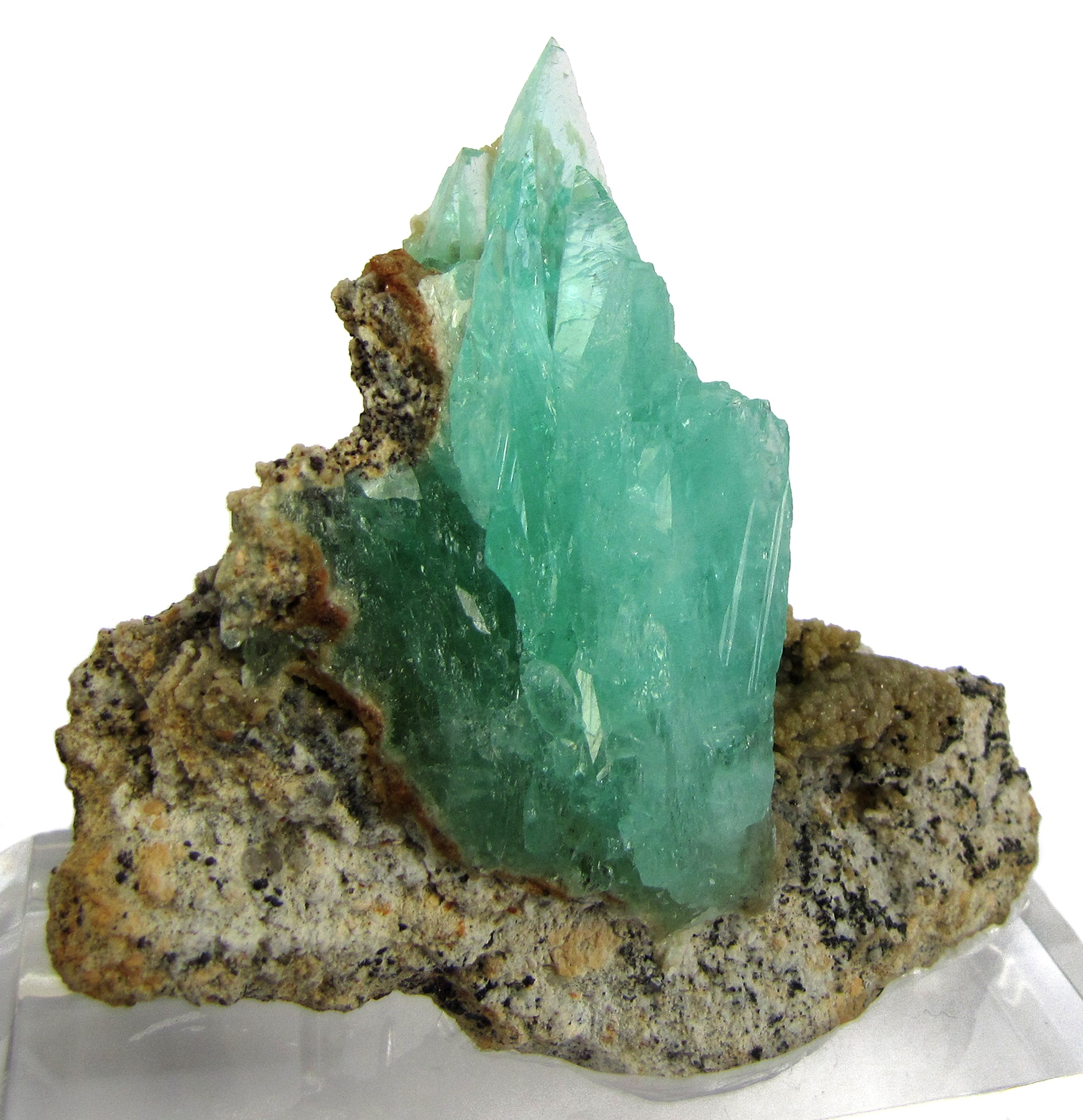
Phosphophyllite, Unificada Mine, Cerro de Potosí, Potosí City, Potosí Department, Bolivia

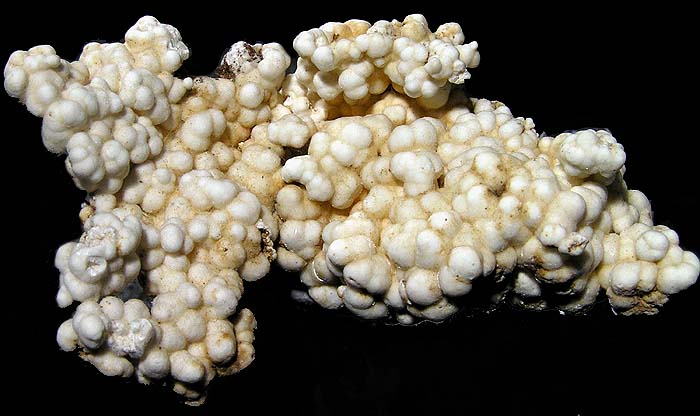
Arsenical picropharmacolite, from Salsigne mine, Languedoc-Roussillon, France 5.5 x 4.0 x 1.8 cm

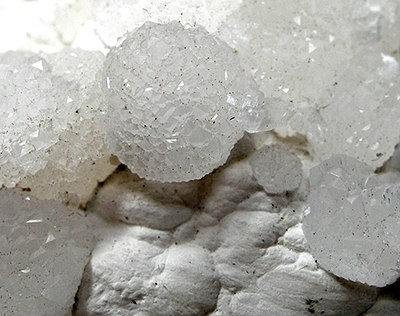
Pinnoite, Inder B deposit and salt dome, Atyrau Oblysy, Kazakhstan

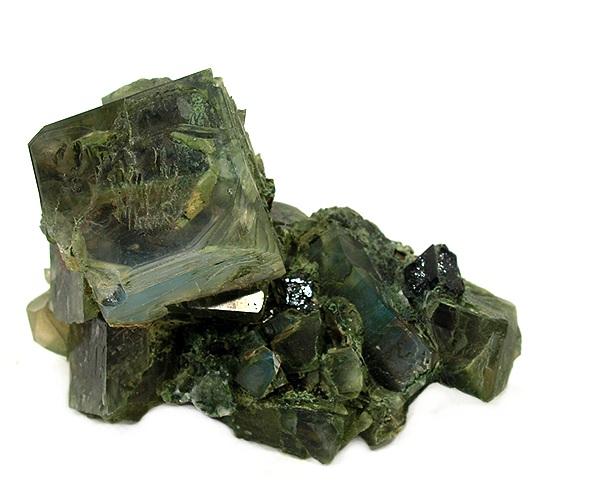
Plagioclase, var. "moonstone", Pili Mine, Sonora, Mexico 6.1 x 4 x 2 cm

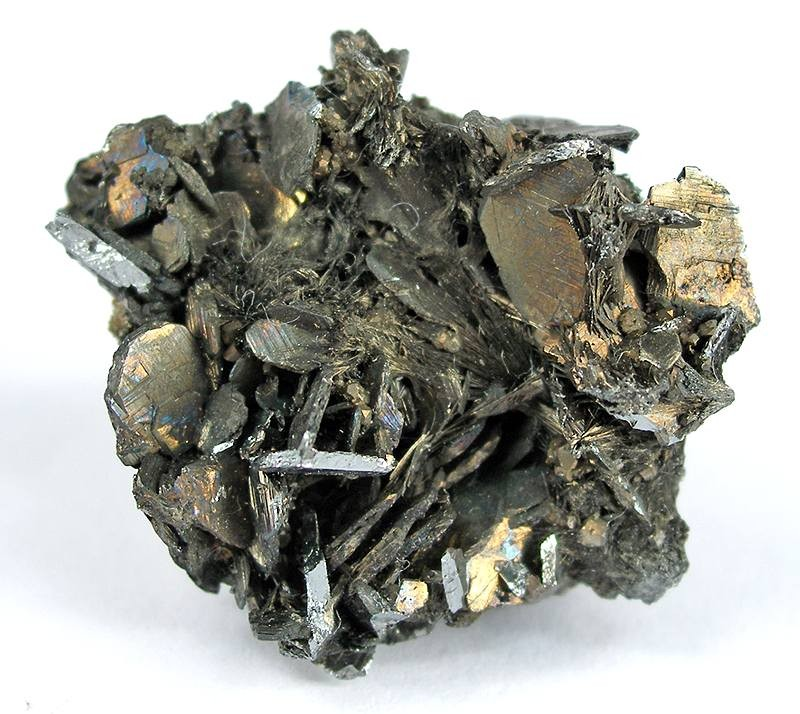
Plagionite, a rare lead-antimony-sulfide. San José Mine, Oruro Department, Bolivia - size: 3.3 x 3.0 x 1.7 cm

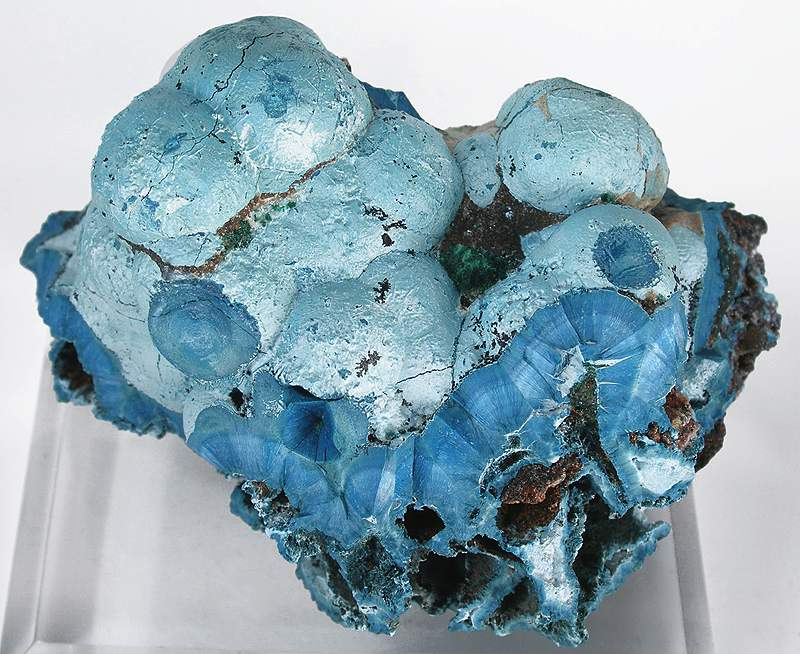
Plancheite, Kambove West Mine, Kambove, Katanga (Shaba), Democratic Republic of Congo, 10.9 x 7.2 x 6.9 cm

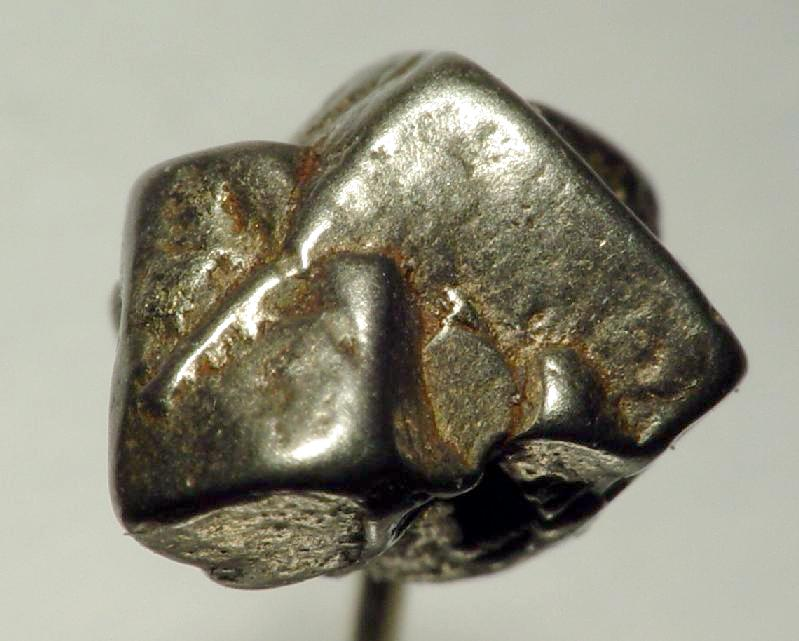
Platinum, cubic crystals, Talnakh Cu-Ni Deposit, Noril'sk, Putoran Plateau, Taimyr Peninsula, Russia - 0.8 x 0.7 x 0.5 cm

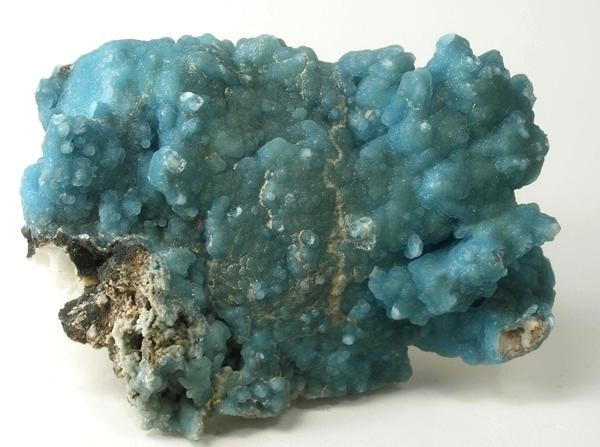
Teal-blue plumbogummite, Yangshuo Mine, Yangshuo County, China - size: 8.9 x 6.9 x 2.8 cm

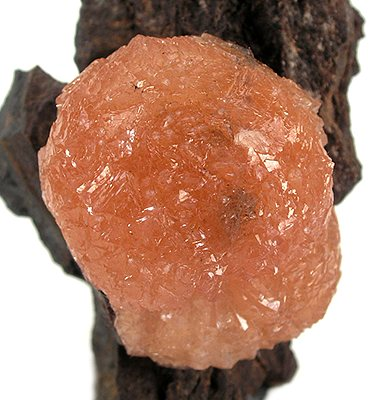
Poldervaartite, N'Chwaning Mines, Kuruman, South Africa - detail; overall size 9 x 5 x 4 cm

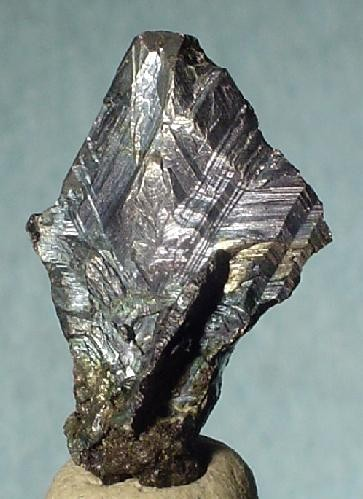
Polybasite, San Genaro Mine, Castrovirreyna Province, Peru - size: 2.3 x 1.6 x 1.0 cm

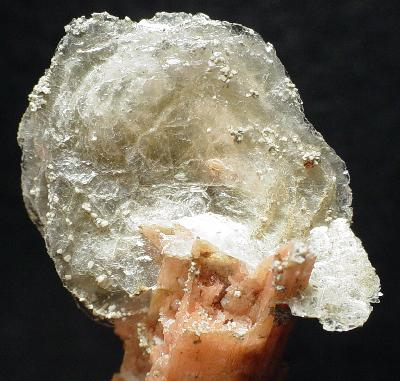
Clear polylithionite on pink serandite, Mont-Saint-Hilaire, Quebec, Canada - 6.5 x 3.5 x 3.5 cm

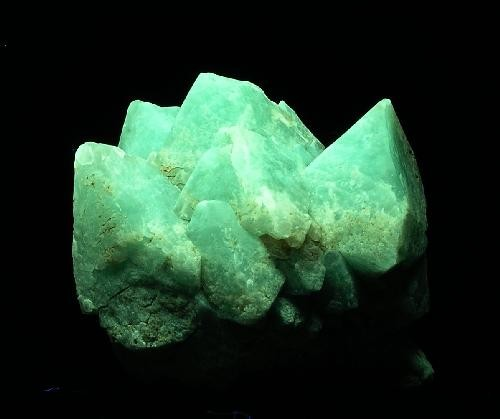
A fine powellite in an unusual green color, from Nasik District, Maharashtra, India - size: 3.3 x 3.3 x 2.5 cm

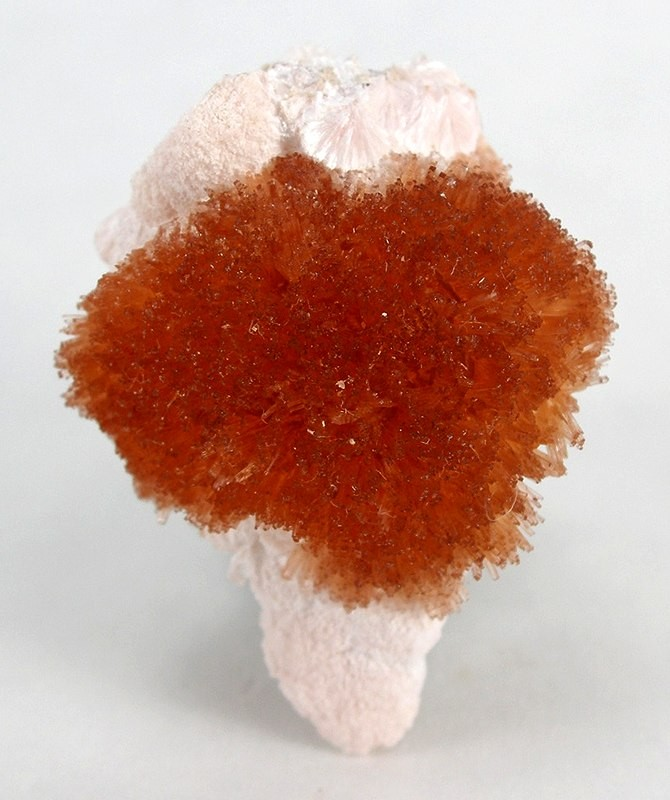
Prehnite in an unusual red-orange color, N'Chwaning Mines, Kuruman, South Africa - 3.5 x 2.6 x 2.5 cm

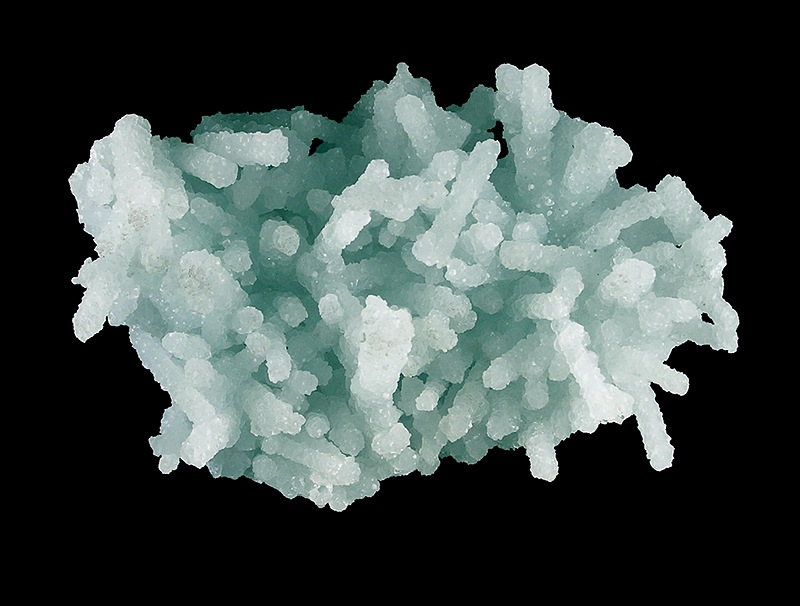
Prehnite pseudomorphs after laumontite, from Malad, Mumbai, India - size: 14.7 × 9.5 × 4.8 cm

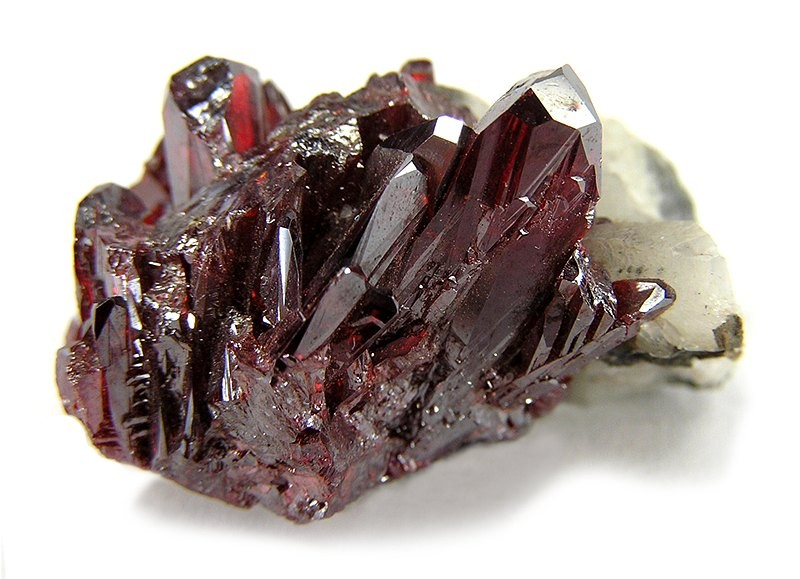
Proustite from Chañarcillo, Copiapó Province, Atacama Region, Chile

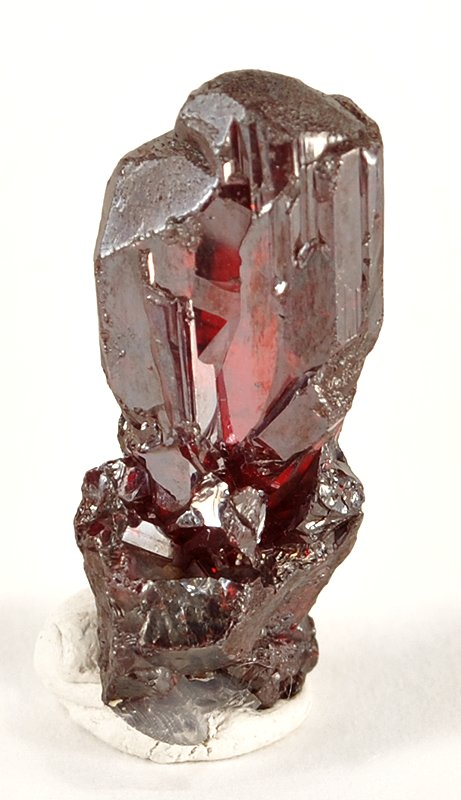
Proustite from the Schneeberg District, Ore Mountains, Saxony, Germany - 2.7 x 1.2 x 1.2 cm

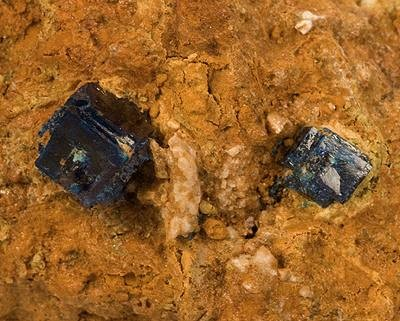
Two pseudoboleite crystals from the Amelia Mine, El Boleo, Baja California Sur, Mexico. Larger crystal is about 7 mm.

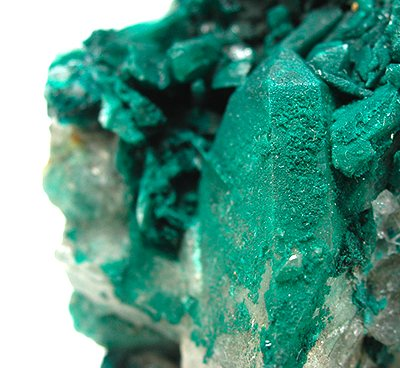
Pseudomalachite on ouartz, unusual specimen from Old Gunnislake Mine, Cornwall, England - 6.2 x 4.6 x 2.1 cm

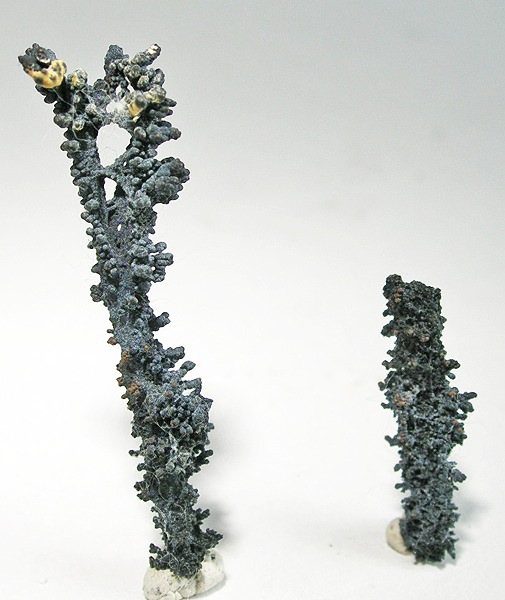
Psilomelane stalactites, Bisbee, Cochise County, Arizona, US. - size: 3.2 x 0.6 x 0.6 cm (largest)

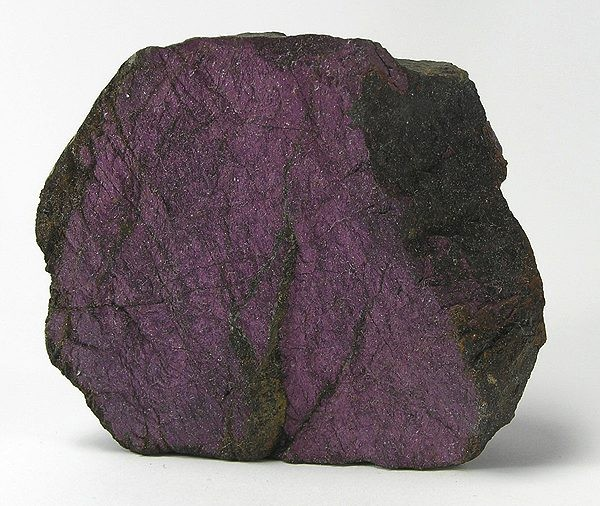
Purpurite, a very rare phosphate of manganese, from Sandamab pegmatite, Usakos, Erongo Region, Namibia - size: 5.4 x 4.6 x 1.9 cm

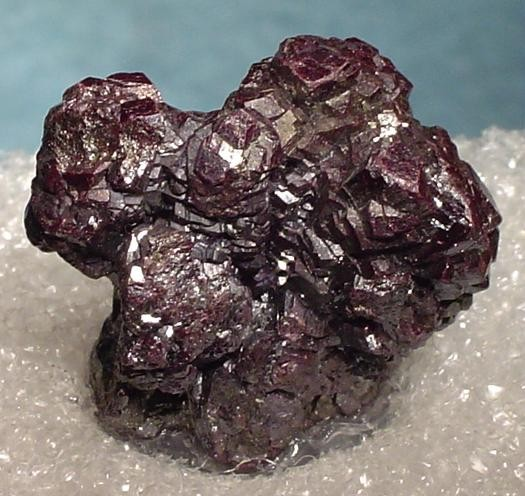
Pyrargyrite, classic "ruby silver" from Zacatecas, Mexico - size: 2.0 x 1.7 x 1.2 cm

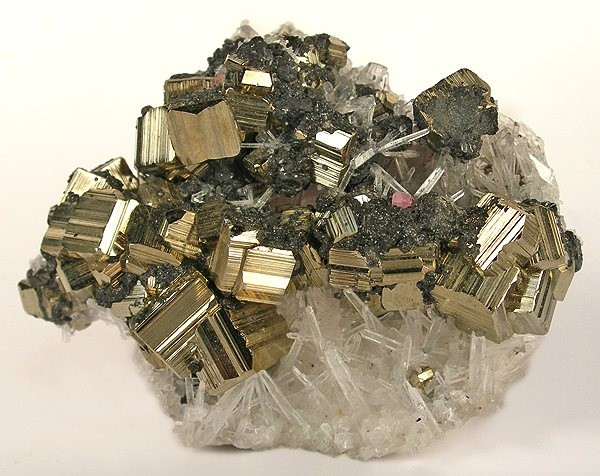
Pyrite from the Sweet Home Mine, with mirror-bright, golden striated cubes intergrown with minor tetrahedrite, on a bed of transparent quartz needles

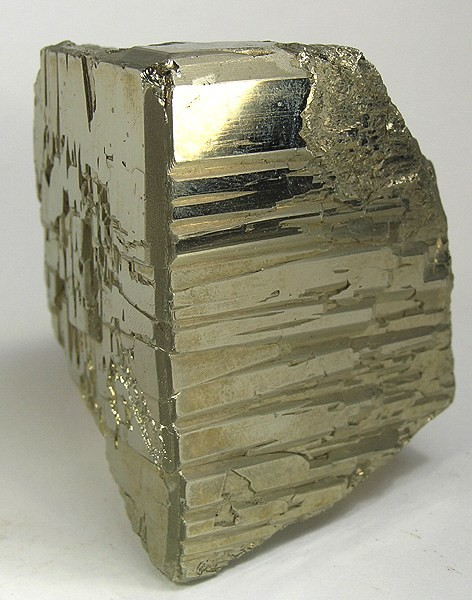
Pyrite, Rico District, Dolores County, Colorado, US - size: 6.1 x 4.9 x 4 cm

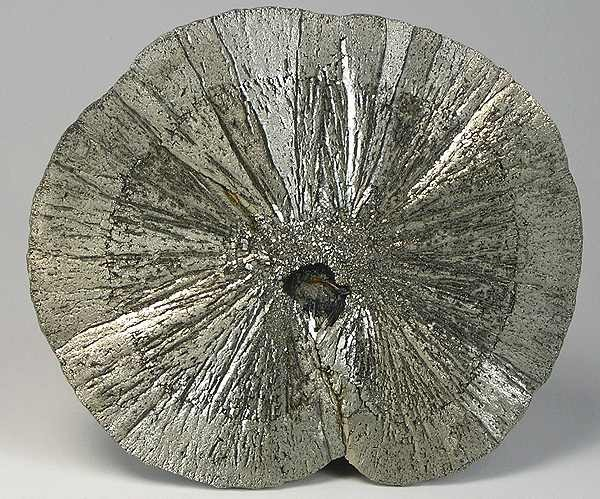
Radiating form of pyrite

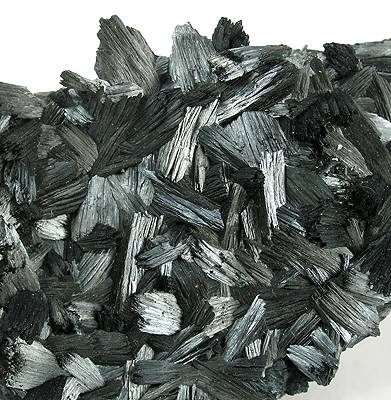
Pyrolusite, Las Cruces, Doña Ana County, New Mexico, US, detail, overall size 9.2 x 4.6 x 2.1 cm

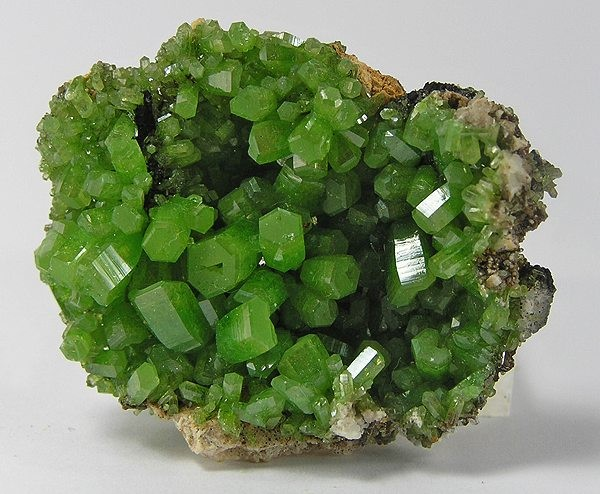
Pyromorphite from Daoping Mine, Guilin Prefecture, Guangxi Zhuang Autonomous Region, China

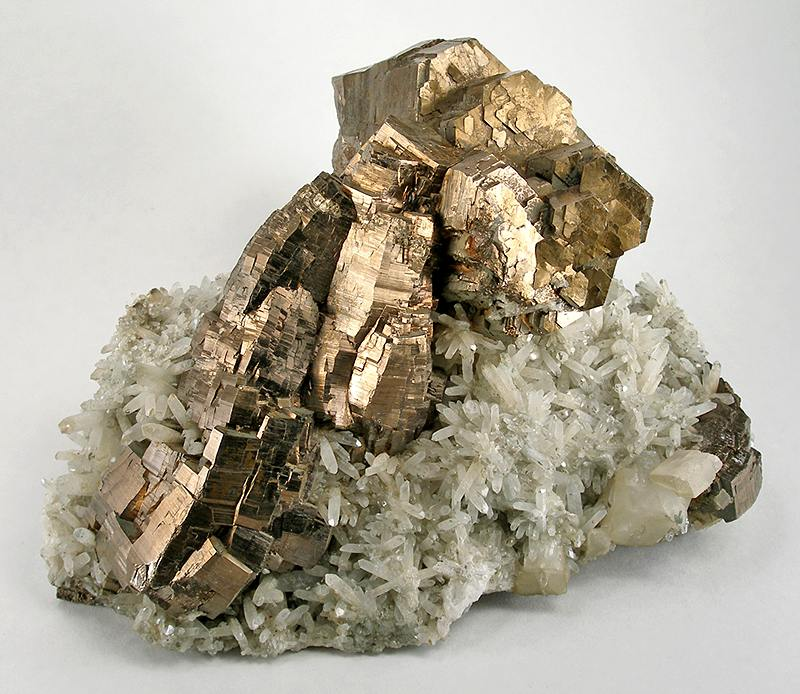
Pyrrhotite on quartz

1. Pääkkönenite (stibnite: IMA1980-063) 2.DB.05
  (IUPAC: diantimony arsenic disulfide)
2. Paarite (meneghinite: IMA2001-016) 2.HB.05a
  (Cu_{1.7}Pb_{1.7}Bi_{6.3}S_{12})
3. Pabstite (benitoite: IMA1964-022) 9.CA.05
  (IUPAC: barium tin nonaoxotrisilicate)
4. Paceite (IMA2001-030) 10.AA.30
  (IUPAC: calcium copper diacetate hexahydrate)
5. Pachnolite (Y: 1863) 3.CB.40
  (IUPAC: sodium calcium alumino hexafluoride monohydrate)
6. Packratite (polyoxometalate: IMA2014-059) 4.0 [no] [no]
7. Paddlewheelite (IMA2017-098) 5.0 [no] [no]
8. Paděraite (cuprobismutite: IMA1983-091) 2.JA.10e
  (Cu_{7}[(Cu,Ag)_{0.33}Pb_{1.33}Bi_{11.33}]S_{22})
9. Padmaite (IMA1990-048) 2.EB.25
  (IUPAC: lead bismuth selenide)
10. Paganoite (IMA1999-043) 8.BH.50 [no]
  (IUPAC: nickel bismuth(III) oxoarsenate)
11. Pahasapaite (beryllophosphate zeolite: IMA1983-060b) 8.CA.25
12. Painite (Y: 1957) 6.AB.85
13. Pakhomovskyite (IMA2004-021) 8.CE.40
  (IUPAC: tricobalt diphosphate octahydrate)
14. Palarstanide (stillwaterite: IMA1976-058) 2.AC.20b
  (IUPAC: pentapalladium di(stannide,arsenide))
15. Palenzonaite (garnet: IMA1986-011) 8.AC.25
  (IUPAC: (sodium dicalcium) dimanganese(II) trivanadate)
16. Palermoite (carminite: 1953) 8.BH.25
  (IUPAC: dilithium strontium tetraluminium tetrahydro tetraphosphate)
17. Palladinite^{Q} (Y: 1837) 4.AB.30 [no] [no]
  (IUPAC: palladium oxide)
18. Palladium (element: 1803) 1.AF.10
19. Palladoarsenide (IMA1973-005) 2.AC.25a
  (IUPAC: dipalladium arsenide)
20. Palladobismutharsenide (IMA1975-017) 2.AC.25f
  (IUPAC: dipalladium (arsenide,bismuthide))
21. Palladodymite (IMA1997-028) 2.AC.25c
  (IUPAC: dipalladium arsenide)
22. Palladogermanide (barringerite: IMA2016-086) 1.BB. [no] [no]
  (IUPAC: dipalladium germanide)
23. Palladosilicide (barringerite: IMA2014-080) 1.BB. [no] [no]
  (IUPAC: dipalladium silicide)
24. Palladothallite (alloy: IMA2019-009a) 1.0 [no] [no]
  (IUPAC: tripaladium thallium alloy)
25. Palladseite (IMA1975-026) 2.BC.05 Pd_{17}Se_{15}
26. Palmierite (palmierite: 1907) 7.AD.40
  (IUPAC: dipotassium lead disulfate)
27. Palygorskite (palygorskite: 1862) 9.EE.20
28. Pampaloite (IMA2017-096) 2.EA.40 [no] [no]
  (IUPAC: gold antimonide telluride)
29. Panasqueiraite (titanite: IMA1978-063) 8.BH.10
  (IUPAC: calcium magnesium hydro phosphate)
30. Pandoraite 8.0
  1. Pandoraite-Ba (IMA2018-024) 8.0 [no] [no]
  2. Pandoraite-Ca (IMA2018-036) 8.0 [no] [no]
31. Panethite (IMA1966-035) 8.AC.65
32. Panguite (IMA2010-057) 4.0 [no] [no]
33. Panichiite (IMA2008-005) 3.0 [no]
  (IUPAC: diammonium tin hexachloride)
34. Panskyite (IMA2020-039) 2.BC. [no] [no]
35. Pansnerite (IMA2016-103) 8.0 [no] [no]
  (IUPAC: tripotassium trisodium hexa(iron(III),alumino) octaarsenate)
36. Panunzite (feldspathoid, nepheline: IMA1978-050) 9.FA.05
  (IUPAC: tripotassium sodium tetra(aluminotetraoxosilicate))
37. Paolovite (tin alloy: IMA1972-025) 1.AG.20
  (IUPAC: dipalladium stannide)
38. Papagoite (IMA1962 s.p.) 9.CE.05
  (IUPAC: calcium copper aluminium hexaoxodisilicate trihydroxyl)
39. Paqueite (IMA2013-053) 9.B?. [no] [no]
40. Para-alumohydrocalcite (alumohydrocalcite: IMA1976-027) 5.DB.05
  (IUPAC: calcium dialuminium tetrahydro dicarbonate hexahydrate)
41. Paraberzeliite (alluaudite: IMA2018-001) 8.0 [no] [no]
  (NaCaCaMg_{2}(AsO_{4})_{3})
42. Parabrandtite (fairfieldite: IMA1986-009) 8.CG.05
  (IUPAC: dicalcium manganese(II) diarsenate dihydrate)
43. Parabutlerite (Y: 1938) 7.DC.10
  (IUPAC: iron(III) hydro sulfate dihydrate)
44. Paracelsian (mineral) (danburite: 1905) 9.FA.40
45. Paracoquimbite (Y: 1933) 7.CB.55
  (IUPAC: diiron(III) trisulfate nonahydrate)
46. Paracostibite (löllingite: IMA1969-023) 2.EB.10e
  (IUPAC: cobalt antimonide sulfide)
47. Paradamite (Y: 1956) 8.BB.35
  (IUPAC: dizinc hydro arsenate)
48. Paradimorphite (IMA2021-101) 2.FA. [no] [no]
49. Paradocrasite (semi-metal alloy: IMA1969-011) 1.CA.15
  (IUPAC: diantimony di(antimony,arsenic) alloy)
50. Parádsasvárite (malachite: IMA2012-077) 5.BA. [no] [no]
  (IUPAC: dizinc dihydro carbonate)
51. Paraershovite (IMA2009-025) 9.DF.15 [no]
52. Parafiniukite (apatite: IMA2018-047) 8.0 [no] [no]
  (IUPAC: dicalcium trimanganese chloro triphosphate)
53. Parafransoletite (IMA1989-049) 8.CA.05
  (IUPAC: tricalcium diberyllium diphosphate dihydroxophosphate tetrahydrate)
54. Parageorgbokiite (selenite: IMA2006-001) 4.JG.05
  (IUPAC: pentacopper dichloro dioxodiselenite)
55. Paragersdorffite (gersdorffite-Pa3: 1982) 2.EB.25 [no] [no]
56. Paragonite (mica: IMA1998 s.p., 1843) 9.EC.15
  (IUPAC: sodium dialuminium (aluminotrisilicate) decaoxy dihydroxyl)
57. Paraguanajuatite (tetradymite: 1949) 2.DC.05
  (IUPAC: dibismuth triselenide)
58. Parahibbingite (IMA2020-038a) 4.0 [no] [no]
59. Parahopeite (Y: 1908) 8.CA.70
  (IUPAC: trizinc diphosphate tetrahydrate)
60. Parakeldyshite (IMA1975-035) 9.BC.10
  (IUPAC: disodium zirconium heptaoxodisilicate)
61. Parakuzmenkoite-Fe (labuntsovite: IMA2001-007) 9.CE.30g [no]
62. Paralabuntsovite-Mg (labuntsovite: IMA2000-A) 9.CE.30f [no]
63. Paralammerite (lammerite-β: IMA2009-002) 8.AB.30 [no]
  (IUPAC: tricopper diarsenate)
64. Paralaurionite (Y: 1899) 3.DC.05
  (IUPAC: lead hydro chloride)
65. Paralomonosovite (seidozerite, murmanite: IMA2014-J) 9.BE. [no] [no]
66. Paralstonite (IMA1979-015) 5.AB.40
  (IUPAC: barium calcium dicarbonate)
67. Paramarkeyite (IMA2021-024) 5.ED. [no] [no]
68. Paramelaconite (Y: 1891) 4.AA.15
  (IUPAC: dicopper(I) dicopper(II) trioxide)
69. Paramendozavilite (heteropolymolybdate: IMA1982-010) 7.GB.45
70. Paramontroseite (ramsdellite: 1955) 4.DB.15a
  (IUPAC: vanadium dioxide)
71. Paranatisite (IMA1990-016) 9.AG.40b
  (IUPAC: disodium titanium oxo(tetraoxosilicate))
72. Paranatrolite (zeolitic tectosilicate: IMA1978-017) 9.GA.05
73. Paraniite-(Y) (IMA1992-018) 7.GA.15
74. Paraotwayite (IMA1984-045a) 7.BB.45
75. Parapierrotite (IMA1974-059) 2.HC.05f
  (IUPAC: thallium octasulfa pentaantimonide)
76. Pararaisaite (IMA2017-110) 7.0 [no] [no]
77. Pararammelsbergite (löllingite: 1940) 2.EB.10e
  (IUPAC: nickel diarsenide)
78. Pararealgar (IMA1980-034) 2.FA.15b
  (IUPAC: tetrarsenic tetrasulfide)
79. Pararobertsite (IMA1987-039) 8.DH.30
  (IUPAC: dicalcium trimanganese(III) dioxotriphosphate trihydrate)
80. Pararsenolamprite (element: IMA1999-047) 1.CA.10 [no]
  (IUPAC: arsenic)
81. Parascandolaite (perovskite: IMA2013-092) 3.0 [no] [no]
  (IUPAC: potassium magnesium trifluoride)
82. Paraschachnerite (amalgam: IMA1971-056) 1.AD.15a
  (IUPAC: trisilver dimercury amalgam)
83. Paraschoepite^{Q} (Y: 1947) 4.GA.05
  Note: probably a mixture (metaschoepite, paulscherrerite and ianthinite).
84. Parascholzite (IMA1980-056) 8.CA.45
  (IUPAC: calcium dizinc diphosphate dihydrate)
85. Parascorodite (IMA1996-061) 8.CD.15
  (IUPAC: iron(III) arsenate dihydrate)
86. Parasibirskite (IMA1996-051) 6.BC.20
  (IUPAC: dicalcium pentaoxodiborate monohydrate)
87. Parasterryite (madocite: IMA2010-033) 2.HC.40 [no]
  (Ag_{4}Pb_{20}(Sb,As)_{24}S_{58})
88. Parasymplesite (vivianite: 1954) 8.CE.40
  (IUPAC: triiron(II) diarsenate octahydrate)
89. Paratacamite (atacamite) 3.DA.10c
  1. Paratacamite (1906) 3.DA.10c
    (IUPAC: tricopper(II) (copper,zinc) hexahydro dichloride)
  2. Paratacamite-(Mg) (IMA2013-014) 3.DA.10c [no] [no]
    (IUPAC: tricopper (magnesium,copper) hexahydro dichloride)
  3. Paratacamite-(Ni) (IMA2013-013) 3.DA.10c [no] [no]
    (IUPAC: tricopper (nickel,copper) hexahydro dichloride)
90. Paratellurite (rutile: IMA1962 s.p.) 4.DE.25
  (IUPAC: tellurium dioxide)
91. Paratimroseite (tellurium oxysalt: IMA2009-065) 4.0 [no] [no]
  (IUPAC: dilead tetracopper di(tellurium hexaoxide) diwater)
92. Paratobermorite (tobermorite: IMA2020-100) 9.DG. [no] [no]
93. Paratooite-(La) (IMA2005-020) 5.AD.20
  (IUPAC: hexa(lanthanum,calcium,sodium,strontium) copper octacarbonate)
94. Paratsepinite (labuntsovite) 9.CE.30b
  1. Paratsepinite-Ba (IMA2002-006) 9.CE.30b [no]
  2. Paratsepinite-Na (IMA2003-008) 9.CE.30b [no]
95. Paraumbite (IMA1982-007) 9.DG.25
  (IUPAC: tripotassium dizirconum hydrogen di(nonaoxotrisilicate) trihydrate)
96. Parauranophane (Y: 1935) 9.AK.15
97. Paravauxite (laueite, laueite: 1922) 8.DC.30
  (IUPAC: iron(II) dialuminium dihydro diphosphate octahydrate)
98. Paravinogradovite (IMA2002-033) 9.DB.25 [no]
99. Parawulffite (IMA2013-036) 7.0 [no] [no]
  (IUPAC: pentapotassium trisodium octacopper tetraoxo octasulfate)
100. Pargasite [Ca-amphibole: IMA2012 s.p., IMA1997 s.p., 1815] 9.DE.15
101. Parisite 5.BD.20b
  (IUPAC: calcium di(REE) difluoro tricarbonate)
  1. Parisite-(Ce) (IMA1987 s.p., 1845) 5.BD.20b
  2. Parisite-(La) (IMA2016-031) 5.BD.20b [no] [no]
  3. Parisite-(Nd)^{N} (Y: 1988) 5.BD.20b
102. Parkerite (Y: 1937) 2.BE.20
  (Ni_{3}(Bi,Pb)_{2}S_{2})
103. Parkinsonite (asisite: IMA1991-030) 3.DB.40
  (IUPAC: heptalead molybdenum nonaoxide dichloride)
104. Parnauite (IMA1978-014) 8.DF.35
  (IUPAC: nonacopper decahydro diarsenate sulfate heptahydrate)
105. Parsettensite (stilpnomelane: 1923) 9.EG.40
106. Parsonsite (Y: 1923) 8.EA.10
  (IUPAC: dilead uranyl diphosphate)
107. Parthéite (zeolitic tectosilicate: IMA1978-026) 9.GB.35
108. Parwanite (IMA1986-036a) 8.DO.40 [no]
109. Parwelite (IMA1966-023) 8.BD.15
110. Pašavaite (IMA2007-059) 2.BE.30
  (IUPAC: tripalladium dilead ditelluride)
111. Pascoite (pascoite: 1914) 4.HC.05
112. Paseroite (crichtonite: IMA2011-069) 4.0 [no]
113. Patrónite (IMA2007 s.p., 1906) 2.EC.10
  (IUPAC: vanadium tetrasulfide)
114. Pattersonite (IMA2005-049) 8.BL.25
  (IUPAC: lead triiron pentahydro diphosphate monohydrate)
115. Patynite (IMA2019-018) 9.0 [no] [no]
116. Pauflerite (IMA2005-004) 7.BB.55 [no]
  (IUPAC: vanadium oxosulfate)
117. Pauladamsite (IMA2015-005) 7.0 [no] [no]
  (IUPAC: tetracopper tetrahydro selenite sulfate dihydrate)
118. Paulgrothite (IMA2021-004) [no] [no]
119. Paulingite (zeolitic tectosilicate) 9.GC.35
  1. Paulingite-Ca (IMA1997 s.p., 1997) 9.GC.35 [no]
  2. Paulingite-K (IMA1997 s.p., 1960) 9.GC.35
120. Paulkellerite (IMA1987-031) 8.BM.10
  (IUPAC: dibismuth(III) iron(III) dihydro dioxophosphate)
121. Paulkerrite (IMA1983-014) 8.DH.35
  (IUPAC: potassium dimagnesium titanium diiron(III) trihydro tetraphosphate pentadecahydrate)
122. Paulmooreite (IMA1978-004) 4.JA.50
  (IUPAC: dilead diarsenic(III) pentaoxide)
123. Pauloabibite (corundum: IMA2012-090) 4.0 [no] [no]
  (IUPAC: sodium niobium trioxide)
124. Paulscherrerite (IMA2008-022) 4.GA.20 [no] [no]
  (IUPAC: uranyl dihydroxide)
125. Pautovite (cubanite: IMA2004-005) 2.FB.20
  (IUPAC: caesium diiron trisulfide)
126. Pavlovskyite (IMA2010-063) 9.B?. [no] [no]
  (IUPAC: octacalcium di(tetraoxosilicate) decaoxotrisilicate)
127. Pavonite (pavonite: 1954) 2.JA.05a
  (IUPAC: silver tribismuth pentasulfide)
128. Paxite (arsenopyrite: IMA1967 s.p., 1961) 2.EB.15c
  (IUPAC: copper diarsenide)

=== Pe – Ph ===
1. Pearceite (pearceite-polybasite: IMA2006 s.p., 1833 Rd) 2.GB.15
  ([Ag_{9}CuS_{4}][(Ag,Cu)_{6}(As,Sb)_{2}S_{7}])
2. Peatite-(Y) (IMA2009-020) 8.0 [no]
3. Pecoraite (serpentine: IMA1969-005) 9.ED.15
4. Pectolite (pectolite: 1828) 9.DG.05
5. Peisleyite (IMA1981-053) 8.DO.15
6. Pekoite (meneghinite: IMA1975-014) 2.HB.05a
  (CuPbBi_{11}S_{18})
7. Pekovite (danburite: IMA2003-035) 9.FA.65
  (IUPAC: strontium octaoxodiborodisilicate)
8. Péligotite (IMA2015-088) 7.0 [no] [no]
  (IUPAC: hexasodium uranyl tetrasulfate tetrawater)
9. Pellouxite (IMA2001-033) 2.JB.35d
  ((Cu,Ag)_{2}Pb_{21}Sb_{23}S_{55}ClO)
10. Pellyite (IMA1970-035) 9.DO.10
11. Penberthycroftite (IMA2015-025) 8.0 [no] [no]
  (IUPAC: [hexaluminium nonahydro triarsenate pentawater] octahydrate)
12. Pendevilleite-(Y) (IMA2022-054) 5.ED. [no] [no]
13. Penfieldite (Y: 1892) 3.DC.15
  (IUPAC: dilead hydro trichloride)
14. Penikisite (bjarebyite: IMA1976-023) 8.BH.20
  (IUPAC: barium dimagnesium dialuminium trihydro triphosphate)
15. Penkvilksite (IMA1973-016) 9.EA.60
  (IUPAC: disodium undecaoxotitanotetrasilicate dihydrate)
16. Pennantite (chlorite: 1946) 9.EC.55
17. Penobsquisite (IMA1995-014) 6.GB.10
18. Penriceite (IMA2021-068) [no] [no]
19. Penroseite (pyrite: 1926) 2.EB.05a
  (IUPAC: (nickel,cobalt,copper) diselenide)
20. Pentagonite (IMA1971-039) 9.EA.55
21. Pentahydrite (chalcanthite: 1951) 7.CB.20
  (IUPAC: magnesium sulfate pentahydrate)
22. Pentahydroborite (IMA1967 s.p., 1961) 6.BB.10
  (IUPAC: calcium hexahydro oxodiborate dihydrate)
23. Pentlandite (pentlandite: 1856) 2.BB.15
  (IUPAC: nona(nickel,iron) octasulfide)
24. Penzhinite (IMA1982-027) 2.BA.75
  (IUPAC: tetra(silver,copper) gold tetra(sulfide,selenide))
25. Peprossiite-(Ce) (IMA1990-002 Rd) 6.CA.45
26. Perbøeite (gatelite) 9.BG.
  (IUPAC: (calcium triREE) (trialuminium iron(II)) heptaoxodisilicate tri(tetraoxysilicate) oxy dihydroxyl)
  1. Perbøeite-(Ce) (IMA2011-055) 9.BG. [no] [no]
  2. Perbøeite-(La) (IMA2018-116) 9.BG. [no] [no]
27. Percleveite
  (IUPAC: diREE heptaoxodisilicate)
  1. Percleveite-(Ce) (IMA2002-023) 9.BC.35 [no]
  2. Percleveite-(La) (IMA2019-037) 9.BC.35 [no] [no]
28. Peretaite (IMA1979-068) 7.DF.45
  (IUPAC: calcium tetraantimony(III) dihydro tetraoxodisulfate dihydrate)
29. Perettiite-(Y) (IMA2014-109) 6.0 [no] [no]
30. Perhamite (IMA1975-019) 8.DO.20
31. Periclase (rocksalt, periclase: 1841) 4.AB.25
  (IUPAC: magnesium(II) oxide)
32. Perite (nadorite: IMA1962 s.p.) 3.DC.30
  (IUPAC: lead bismuth dioxochloride)
33. Perlialite (zeolitic tectosilicate: IMA1982-032) 9.GC.25
34. Perloffite (bjarebyite: IMA1976-002) 8.BH.20
  (IUPAC: barium dimanganese(II) diron(III) trihydro triphosphate)
35. Permingeatite (stannite: IMA1971-003) 2.KA.10
  (IUPAC: tricopper antimonide tetraselenide)
36. Perovskite (oxide perovskite: 1839) 4.CC.30
  (IUPAC: calcium titanium trioxide)
37. Perraultite (seidozerite, bafertisite: IMA1984-033) 9.BE.67
  (IUPAC: barium sodium tetramanganese dititanium heptaoxodisilicate dioxy dihydroxyl fluoride)
38. Perrierite (chevkinite) 9.BE.70
  1. Perrierite-(Ce) (IMA1987 s.p., 1950) 9.BE.70
  2. Perrierite-(La) (IMA2010-089) 9.BE.70 [no]
39. Perroudite (IMA1986-035) 2.FC.20c
  (IUPAC: tetrasilver pentamercury di(iodo,bromo) dichloro pentasulfide)
40. Perryite (silicide: IMA1968 s.p., 1965) 1.BB.10
  (IUPAC: octa(nickel,iron) tri(silicide,phosphide))
41. Pertlikite (voltaite: IMA2005-055) 7.CC.25 [no]
42. Pertoldite (IMA2021-074) 4.DE. [no] [no]
43. Pertsevite 6.AB.75
  (IUPAC: dimagnesium trioxoborate (monovalent anion))
  1. Pertsevite-(F) (IMA2002-030) 6.AB.75 [no]
  2. Pertsevite-(OH) (IMA2008-060) 6.AB.75 [no] [no]
44. Petalite (Y: 1800) 9.EF.05
  (IUPAC: lithium aluminium decaoxotetrasilicate)
45. Petarasite (IMA1979-063) 9.CJ.40
46. Petedunnite (pyroxene: IMA1983-073) 9.DA.15
  (IUPAC: calcium zinc hexaoxodisilicate)
47. Peterandresenite (polyoxometalate: IMA2012-084) 4.0 [no] [no]
48. Peterbaylissite (IMA1993-041) 5.DC.25
  (IUPAC: trimercury hydroxo carbonate dihydrate)
49. Petermegawite (IMA2021-079) 4.JJ. [no] [no]
50. Petersenite-(Ce) (IMA1992-048) 5.AD.15
  (IUPAC: tetrasodium dicerium pentacarbonate)
51. Petersite 8.DL.15
  (IUPAC: hexacopper (REE) hexahydro triphosphate trihydrate)
  1. Petersite-(Ce) (IMA2014-002) 8.DL.15 [no] [no]
  2. Petersite-(La) (IMA2017-089) 8.DL.15 [no] [no]
  3. Petersite-(Y) (IMA1981-064) 8.DL.15
52. Petewilliamsite (IMA2002-059) 8.FA.25
  ((Ni,Co)_{30}(As_{2}O_{7})_{15})
53. Petitjeanite (IMA1992-013) 8.BO.10
  (IUPAC: tribismuth hydro oxodiphosphate)
54. Petříčekite (marcasite: IMA2015-111) 2.0 [no] [no]
  (IUPAC: copper diselenide)
55. Petrovicite (IMA1975-010) 2.LB.40
  (IUPAC: tricopper mercury lead bismuth pentaselenide)
56. Petrovite (IMA2018-149b) 7.0 [no] [no]
57. Petrovskaite (IMA1983-079) 2.BA.75
  (IUPAC: gold silver sulfide)
58. Petrukite (wurtzite: IMA1985-052) 2.KA.05
59. Petscheckite (IMA1975-038) 4.DH.35
  (IUPAC: uranium(IV) iron(II) diniobium octaoxide)
60. Petterdite (dundasite: IMA1999-034) 5.DB.10
  (IUPAC: lead dichromium tetrahydro dicarbonate monohydrate)
61. Petzite (Y: 1845) 2.BA.75
  (IUPAC: trisilver gold ditelluride)
62. Pezzottaite (distorted beryl: IMA2003-022) 9.CJ.60
63. Pharmacoalumite (pharmacosiderite: IMA1980-002) 8.DK.12
  (IUPAC: dipotassium octaluminium octahydro hexarsenate tridecahydrate)
64. Pharmacolite (gypsum: 1800) 8.CJ.50
  (IUPAC: calcium hydroxoarsenate dihydrate)
65. Pharmacosiderite (pharmacosiderite: 1786) 8.DK.10
66. Pharmazincite (feldspathoid, nepheline: IMA2014-015) 8.0 [no] [no]
  (IUPAC: potassium zinc arsenate)
67. Phaunouxite (IMA1980-062) 8.CJ.40
  (IUPAC: tricalcium diarsenate undecahydrate)
68. Phenakite (phenakite: 1834) 9.AA.05
  (IUPAC: diberyllium tetraoxosilicate)
69. Philipsbornite (alunite, crandallite: IMA1981-029) 8.BL.10
  (IUPAC: lead trialuminium arsenate hexahydro hydroxoarsenate)
70. Philipsburgite (IMA1984-029) 8.DA.35
71. Phillipsite (zeolitic tectosilicate) 9.GC.10
  1. Phillipsite-Ca (IMA1997 s.p., 1972) 9.GC.10 [no]
  2. Phillipsite-K (IMA1997 s.p., 1962) 9.GC.10
  3. Phillipsite-Na (IMA1997 s.p., 1825) 9.GC.10 [no]
72. Philolithite (IMA1996-020) 5.BF.35
73. Philoxenite (IMA2015-108) 7.0 [no] [no]
74. Philrothite (sartorite: IMA2013-066) 2.0 [no]
  (IUPAC: thallium pentasulfa triarsenide)
75. Phlogopite (mica: 1841) 9.EC.20
  (IUPAC: potassium trimagnesium (aluminodecaoxotrisilicate) dihydroxyl)
76. Phoenicochroite (IMA1980 s.p., 1833) 7.FB.05
  (IUPAC: dilead oxochromate)
77. Phosgenite (Y: 1841) 5.BE.20
  (IUPAC: dilead dichloro carbonate)
78. Phosinaite-(Ce) (IMA1973-058) 9.CF.15
  (IUPAC: tridecasodium calcium cerium tetra(trioxosilicate) tetraphosphate)
79. Phosphammite (Y: 1852) 8.AD.20
  (IUPAC: diammonium hydroxophosphate)
80. Phosphocyclite 8.FA.
  1. Phosphocyclite-(Fe) (IMA2020-087) 8.FA. [no] [no]
  2. Phosphocyclite-(Ni) (IMA2020-088) 8.FA. [no] [no]
81. Phosphoellenbergerite (ellenbergerite: IMA1994-006) 8.BB.55
82. Phosphoferrite (reddingite: IMA1980 s.p., 1920 Rd) 8.CC.05
  (IUPAC: triiron(II) diphosphate trihydrate)
83. Phosphofibrite (phosphofibrite: IMA1982-082) 8.DJ.20
84. Phosphogartrellite (tsumcorite: IMA1996-035) 8.CG.20
  (IUPAC: lead copper iron(III) di(hydro,water) diphosphate)
85. Phosphohedyphane (apatite: IMA2005-026) 8.BN.05 [no]
  (IUPAC: dicalcium trilead chloro triphosphate)
86. Phosphoinnelite (IMA2005-022) 9.BE.40
  (IUPAC: trisodium tetrabarium trititanium di(heptaoxodisilicate) di(phosphate,sulfate) dioxofluorine)
87. Phosphophyllite (Y: 1920) 8.CA.40
  (IUPAC: dizinc iron(II) diphosphate tetrahydrate)
88. Phosphorrösslerite (Y: 1939) 8.CE.20
  (IUPAC: magnesium hydroxophosphate heptahydrate)
89. Phosphosiderite (metavariscite: IMA1967 s.p., 1890) 8.CD.05
  (IUPAC: iron(III) phosphate dihydrate)
90. Phosphovanadylite 8.DM.20
  1. Phosphovanadylite-Ba (2013, IMA1996-037 Rd) 8.DM.20
    (Ba[V^{4+}_{4}P_{2}O_{12}(OH)_{4}]·12H_{2}O)
  2. Phosphovanadylite-Ca (IMA2011-101) 8.DM.20 [no] [no]
    (Ca[V^{4+}_{4}P_{2}O_{12}(OH)_{4}]·12H_{2}O)
91. Phosphowalpurgite (IMA2001-062) 8.EA.05
  (IUPAC: uranyl tetrabismuth tetraoxodiphosphate dihydrate)
92. Phosphuranylite (phosphuranylite: 1879) 8.EC.10
  (IUPAC: potassium calcium trihydronium heptauranyl tetraoxotetraphosphate octahydrate)
93. Phoxite (IMA2018-009) 10.0 [no] [no]
94. Phuralumite (phosphuranylite: IMA1978-044) 8.EC.05
  (IUPAC: dialuminium triuranyl hexahydro diphosphate decahydrate)
95. Phurcalite (phosphuranylite: 1977–040) 8.EC.35
  (IUPAC: dicalcium triuranyl dioxodiphosphate heptahydrate)
96. Phylloretine^{Q} (Y: 1839) 10.BA.35 [no] [no]
97. Phyllotungstite (IMA1984-018) 7.GB.20

=== Pi – Pl ===
1. Picaite (IMA2018-022) 8.0 [no] [no]
  (IUPAC: sodium calcium hydroxoarsenate dihydroxoarsenate)
2. Piccoliite (carminite: IMA2017-016) 8.0 [no] [no]
  (IUPAC: sodium calcium dimanganese(III) oxodehydro diarsenate)
3. Pickeringite (halotrichite: 1844) 7.CB.85
  (IUPAC: magnesium dialuminium tetrasulfate docosahydrate)
4. Picotpaulite (cubanite: IMA1970-031) 2.CB.60
  (IUPAC: thallium diiron trisulfide)
5. Picromerite (picromerite: IMA1982 s.p., 1955) 7.CC.60
  (IUPAC: dipotassium magnesium disulfate hexahydrate)
6. Picropharmacolite (Y: 1819) 8.CH.15
  (IUPAC: tetracalcium magnesium di(hydroxoarsenate) diarsenate undecahydrate)
7. Pieczkaite (apatite: IMA2014-005) 8.0 [no] [no]
  (IUPAC: pentamanganese chloro triphosphate)
8. Piemontite (epidote, epidote: IMA1962 s.p., 1853) 9.BG.05
  (IUPAC: dicalcium (dialuminium manganese(III)) heptaoxodisilicate tetraoxosilicate oxyhydroxyl)
9. Piemontite (epidote, clinozoisite) 9.BG.
  (IUPAC: calcium [metal] (dialuminiium manganese(III)) heptaoxodisilicate tetraoxosilicate oxyhydroxyl)
  1. Piemontite-(Pb) (IMA2011-087) 9.BG. [no]
  2. Piemontite-(Sr) (IMA1989-031) 9.BG.
10. Piergorite-(Ce) (IMA2005-008) 9.DL.10 [no]
11. Pierrotite (sartorite: IMA1969-036) 2.HC.05f
  (Tl_{2}(Sb,As)_{10}S_{16})
12. Pigeonite (pyroxene: IMA1988 s.p., 1900) 9.DA.10
  (IUPAC: di(magnesium,iron,calcium) hexaoxodisilicate)
13. Pigotite^{Q} (Y: 1840) 10.AC.15 [no] [no]
14. Pilawite-(Y) (carminite: IMA2013-125) 9.0 [no] [no]
  (IUPAC: dicalcium diyttrium tetraluminium tetra(tetraoxosilicate) dioxydihydroxyl)
15. Pillaite (IMA1997-042) 2.JB.35c
16. Pilsenite (tetradymite: IMA1982 s.p., 1853 Rd) 2.DC.05
  (IUPAC: tetrabismuth tritelluride)
17. (Pimelite: a nickel-dominant smectite (smectite group: saponite group and montmorillonite group))
18. Pinakiolite (Y: 1890) 6.AB.35
19. Pinalite (IMA1988-025) 3.DC.55
  (IUPAC: trilead oxochloro tungstate)
20. Pinchite (IMA1973-052) 3.DD.25
  (IUPAC: pentamercury tetraoxodichloride)
21. Pingguite (tellurite: IMA1993-019) 4.JL.20
  (IUPAC: hexabismuth tridecaoxoditellurate(IV))
22. Pinnoite (Y: 1884) 6.BB.05
  (IUPAC: magnesium [hexahydro oxodiborate])
23. Pintadoite^{Q} (Y: 1914) 8.FC.15
  (IUPAC: dicalcium heptaoxodivanadate(V) nonahydrate)
24. Piretite (selenite: IMA1996-002) 4.JJ.15
  (IUPAC: calcium triuranyl tetrahydro diselenite tetrahydrate)
25. Pirquitasite (stannite: IMA1980-091) 2.CB.15a
  (IUPAC: disilver zinc tetrasulfa stannide)
26. Pirssonite (Y: 1896) 5.CB.30
  (IUPAC: disodium calcium dicarbonate dihydrate)
27. Písekite-(Y)^{Q} (Y: 1923) 4.00. [no] [no]
  Note: synonym of monazite-(Y) (not approved).
28. Pitiglianoite (cancrinite: IMA1990-012) 9.FB.05
29. Pitticite^{Q} (Y: 1808) 8.DB.05
  Note: "generic name for amorphous, gel-like, ferric iron arsenate minerals of varying chemical composition" (P. J. Dunn, 1982).
30. Pittongite (IMA2005-034a) 4.DH.45
31. Piypite (IMA1982-097) 7.BC.40
  (IUPAC: tetrapotassium tetracopper dioxotetrasulfate · (sodium,copper)chloride)
32. Pizgrischite (cuprobismutite: IMA2001-002) 2.JA.10d [no]
  ((Cu,Fe)Cu_{14}PbBi_{17}S_{34})
33. Plagionite^{I} (plagionite: 1833) 2.HC.10b
  (Pb_{5}Sb_{8}S_{17})
34. Plancheite (IMA1967 s.p., 1908 Rd) 9.DB.35
  (IUPAC: octacopper di(undecaoxotetrasilicate) tetrahydroxyl monohydrate)
35. Planerite (turquoise: IMA1998 s.p., 1862 Rd) 8.DD.15
  (IUPAC: hexaaluminium octahydro diphosphate di(hydroxophosphate) tetrahydrate)
36. Plášilite (IMA2014-021) 7.0 [no] [no]
  (IUPAC: sodium uranyl hydro sulfate dihydrate)
37. Platarsite (pyrite: IMA1976-050) 2.EB.25
  (IUPAC: platinum sulfa arsenide)
38. Platinum (element: 1750) 1.AF.10
39. Plattnerite (rutile: 1845) 4.DB.05
  (IUPAC: lead(IV) oxide)
40. Plavnoite (zippeite: IMA2015-059) 7.0 [no] [no]
  (K_{0.8}Mn_{0.6}[(UO_{2})_{2}O_{2}(SO_{4})]·3.5H_{2}O)
41. Playfairite (madocite: IMA1966-019) 2.LB.30
  (Pb_{16}(Sb,As)_{19}S_{44}Cl)
42. Plimerite (rockbridgeite: IMA2008-013) 8.BC.10
  (IUPAC: zinc tetrairon(III) pentahydro triphosphate)
43. Pliniusite (apatite: IMA2018-031) 8.BN.05 [no] [no]
44. Plombièrite (tobermorite: 1858) 9.DG.08
45. Plumboagardite (mixite: IMA2003-031a) 8.DL.15
46. Plumboferrite (magnetoplumbite: 1881) 4.CC.45
47. Plumbogummite (alunite, crandallite: IMA1999 s.p., 1819 Rd) 8.BL.10
  (IUPAC: lead trialuminium hexahydro phosphate hydroxophosphate)
48. Plumbojarosite (alunite, alunite: IMA1987 s.p., 1902 Rd) 7.BC.10
  (IUPAC: lead hexairon(III) dodecahydro tetrasulfate)
49. Plumbonacrite (Y: 1889 Rd) 5.BE.15
  (IUPAC: pentalead oxodihydro tricarbonate)
50. Plumbopalladinite (alloy: IMA1970-020) 1.AG.25
  (IUPAC: tripalladium dilead alloy)
51. Plumboperloffite (bjarebyite: IMA2020-007) 8.0 [no] [no]
52. Plumbopharmacosiderite (pharmacosiderite: IMA2016-109) 8.0 [no] [no]
  (IUPAC: lead octairon(III) octahydro hexarsenate decahydrate)
53. Plumbophyllite (IMA2008-025) 9.EA.85 [no]
  (IUPAC: dilead decaoxotetrasilicate monohydrate)
54. Plumboselite (IMA2010-028) 4.0 [no]
  (IUPAC: trilead dioxoselenite)
55. Plumbotellurite (tellurite: IMA1980-102) 4.JK.55
  (IUPAC: lead tellurate(IV))
56. Plumbotsumite (IMA1979-049) 9.HH.20
  (IUPAC: pentalead octaoxotetrasilicate decahydroxyl)
57. Plumosite^{Q} (Y: 1845) 2.0 [no] [no]
  (IUPAC: dilead pentasulfa diantimonide)
  Note: old specimens are various Pb–Sb sulfosalts with a hair-like (feather ore) habit.
  Many times boulangerite, but sometimes jamesonite, zinkenite, as well.

=== Po – Py ===
1. Podlesnoite (IMA2006-033) 5.BC.15 [no]
  (IUPAC: barium dicalcium difluoro dicarbonate)
2. Poellmannite (hydrotalcite: IMA2021-109) 7.DF. [no] [no]
3. Pohlite (IMA2022-043) 4.KB. [no] [no]
4. Poitevinite (IMA1963-010) 7.CB.05
  (IUPAC: copper sulfate monohydrate)
5. Pokhodyashinite (sulfosalt: IMA2019-130) 2.0 [no] [no]
6. Pokrovskite (malachite: IMA1982-054) 5.BA.10
  (IUPAC: dimagnesium dihydro carbonate)
7. Poirierite (IMA2018-026b) 9.A [no] [no]
  (IUPAC: dimagnesium tetraoxysilicate)
8. Polarite (IMA1969-032) 2.AC.40
  (Pd(Bi,Pb))
9. Poldervaartite (IMA1992-012) 9.AF.90
  (IUPAC: calcium (calcium,manganese) (hydrotrioxosilicate) hydroxyl)
10. Polekhovskyite (phosphide: IMA2018-147) 1.0 [no] [no]
11. Polezhaevaite-(Ce) (gagarinite: IMA2009-015) 3.AB.35 [no] [no]
  (IUPAC: sodium strontium cerium hexafluoride)
12. Polhemusite (IMA1972-017) 2.CB.05c
  (IUPAC: (zinc,mercury) sulfide)
13. Polkanovite (IMA1997-030) 2.AC.30
  (IUPAC: dodecarhenium heptarsenide)
14. Polkovicite (1974-037) 2.CB.35a
  ((Fe,Pb)_{3}(Ge,Fe)_{(1-x)}S_{4})
15. Polloneite (sartorite: IMA2014-093) 2.0 [no] [no]
  (AgPb_{46}As_{26}Sb_{23}S_{120})
16. Pollucite (zeolitic tectosilicate: IMA1997 s.p., 1846) 9.GB.05
  (IUPAC: caesium (aluminodisilicate) hexaoxide (n)hydrate)
17. Polyakovite-(Ce) (chevkinite: IMA1998-029) 9.BE.70 [no]
  (IUPAC: tetra(cerium,calcium) magnesium dichromium di(titanium,niobium) docosaoxotetrasilicate)
18. Polyarsite (IMA2019-058) 8.0 [no] [no]
19. Polybasite (pearceite-polybasite: IMA2006 s.p., 1829 Rd) 2.GB.15
  ([Ag_{9}CuS_{4}][(Ag,Cu)_{6}(Sb,As)_{2}S_{7}])
20. Polycrase-(Y) (columbite: IMA1987 s.p., 1844) 4.DG.05
  (IUPAC: yttrium di(titanium,niobium) hexa(oxo,hydro))
21. Polydymite (spinel, linnaeite: 1876) 2.DA.05
  (IUPAC: nickel(II) dinickel(III) tetrasulfide)
22. Polyhalite (Y: 1817) 7.CC.65
  (IUPAC: dipotassium dicalcium magnesium tetrasulfate dihydrate)
23. Polylithionite (mica: IMA1998 s.p., 1884) 9.EC.20
  (IUPAC: potassium dilithium aluminium decaoxotetrasilicate difluorine)
24. Polyphite (seidozerite, murmanite: IMA1990-025) 9.BE.47
25. Pomite (heteropolyvanadate: IMA2021-063) 4.H0. [no] [no]
26. Ponomarevite (IMA1986-040) 3.DA.35
  (IUPAC: tetrapotassium tetracopper oxodecachloride)
27. Popovite (IMA2013-060) 8. [no] [no]
  (IUPAC: pentacopper dioxodiarsenate)
28. Poppiite (IMA2005-018) 9.BG.20 [no]
29. Popugaevaite (IMA2019-115) 6.CE. [no] [no]
30. Portlandite (brucite: 1933) 4.FE.05
  (IUPAC: calcium dihydroxide)
31. Pošepnýite (tetrahedrite: IMA2018-121a) 2.0 [no] [no]
32. Posnjakite (IMA1967-001) 7.DD.10
  (IUPAC: tetracopper hexahydro sulfate monohydrate)
33. Postite (decavanadate: IMA2011-060) 4.0 [no]
34. Potarite (amalgam: 1928) 1.AD.25
  (IUPAC: palladium mercury amalgam)
35. Potassic-arfvedsonite [Na-amphibole: IMA2012 s.p., potassicarfvedsonite (IMA2003-043)] 9.DE.25 [no]
36. Potassiccarpholite (carpholite: IMA002-064) 9.DB.05 [no]
37. Potassic-chloro-hastingsite [Ca-amphibole: IMA2012 s.p., chloro-potassichastingsite (IMA2005-007)] 9.DE.15 [no]
38. Potassic-chloro-pargasite [Ca-amphibole: IMA2012 s.p., potassic-chloropargasite (IMA2001-036)] 9.DE.15 [no] [no]
39. Potassic-ferri-leakeite [Na-amphibole: IMA2012 s.p., potassicleakeite (IMA2001-049)] 9.DE.25 [no]
40. Potassic-ferro-ferri-sadanagaite [Ca-amphibole: IMA2012 s.p., potassic-ferrisadanagaite (IMA1997-035)] 9.DE.15 [no]
41. Potassic-ferro-ferri-taramite [Na-Ca-amphibole: IMA2012 s.p., mboziite (IMA1964-003)] 9.DE.20 [no]
42. Potassic-ferro-pargasite [Ca-amphibole: IMA2012 s.p., potassic-ferropargasite (IMA2007-053)] 9.DE.15 [no]
43. Potassic-ferro-sadanagaite [Ca-amphibole: IMA2012 s.p., potassic-aluminosadanagaite (IMA1980-027)] 9.DE.15 [no]
44. Potassic-ferro-taramite [Na-Ca-amphibole: IMA2012 s.p., potassic-aluminotaramite (IMA2007-015)] 9.D [no] [no]
45. Potassic-fluoro-hastingsite [Ca-amphibole: IMA2012 s.p., fluoro-potassichastingsite (IMA2005-006)] 9.DE.15 [no]
46. Potassic-fluoro-pargasite [Ca-amphibole: IMA2012 s.p., fluoro-potassic-pargasite (IMA2009-091)] 9.DE.10 [no]
47. Potassic-fluoro-richterite [Na-Ca-amphibole: IMA2012 s.p., fluoro-potassicrichterite (IMA2004 s.p.), potassium-fluorrichterite (IMA1986-046)] 9.DE.20 [no] [no]
48. Potassic-hastingsite [Ca-amphibole: IMA2018-160] 9.D [no]
49. Potassic-jeanlouisite [amphibole: IMA2018-050] 9.DE. [no] [no]
50. Potassic-magnesio-arfvedsonite [Na-amphibole: IMA2016-083] 9.DE.25 [no] [no]
51. Potassic-magnesio-fluoro-arfvedsonite [Na-amphibole: IMA2012 s.p., fluoro-potassic-magnesio-arfvedsonite (IMA2006 s.p.), potassium fluoro-magnesio-arfvedsonite (IMA1985-023)] 9.DE.25 [no] [no]
52. Potassic-magnesio-hastingsite [Ca-amphibole: IMA2012 s.p., potassic-magnesiohastingsite (IMA2004-027b)] 9.DE.15 [no]
53. Potassic-mangani-leakeite [Na-amphibole: IMA2012 s.p., kornite (IMA1992-032)] 9.DE.25 [no]
54. Potassic-pargasite [Ca-amphibole: IMA2012 s.p., potassicpargasite (IMA1994-046)] 9.DE.15 [no]
55. Potassic-richterite (Na-Ca-amphibole: IMA2017-102) 9.D [no] [no]
56. Potassic-sadanagaite [Ca-amphibole: IMA2012 s.p., potassic-magnesiosadanagaite (IMA2003 s.p.), magnesiosadanagaite (2004), magnesio-sadanagaite (IMA1982-102)] 9.D [no] [no]
57. Pottsite (IMA1986-045) 8.CG.25
  (IUPAC: (trilead bismuth) bismuth tetravanadate monohydrate)
58. Poubaite (aleksite: IMA1975-015) 2.GC.40c
  (IUPAC: lead dibismuthide tetra(selenide,telluride,sulfide))
59. Poudretteite (milarite: IMA1986-028) 9.CM.05
  (IUPAC: potassium disodium (triborododecasilicate) triacontaoxy)
60. Poughite (tellurite: IMA1966-048) 4.JN.10
  (IUPAC: diron(III) di(trioxotellurate(IV)) sulfate trihydrate)
61. Povondraite (tourmaline: IMA1990-E) 9.CK.05
62. Powellite (scheelite: 1891) 7.GA.05
  (IUPAC: calcium tetraoxomolybdate)
63. Poyarkovite (IMA1980-099) 3.DD.10
  (IUPAC: tri(dimercury) dioxodichloride)
64. Pradetite (lindackerite: IMA2006-D, IMA1991-046 Rd) 8.CE.30 [no] [no]
  (IUPAC: cobalt tetracopper diarsenate di(hydroxoarsenate) nonahydrate)
65. Prachařite (IMA2018-081) 4.0 [no] [no]
66. Prehnite (Y: 1789) 9.DP.20
  (IUPAC: dicalcium aluminium (aluminotrisilicate) decaoxy dihydroxyl)
67. Preisingerite (IMA1981-016) 8.BO.10
  (IUPAC: tribismuth hydro oxodiarsenate)
68. Preiswerkite (mica: IMA1979-008) 9.EC.20
  (IUPAC: sodium aluminium dimagnesium (dialuminodisilicate) decaoxy dihydroxyl)
69. Preobrazhenskite (Y: 1956) 6.GB.15
  (IUPAC: trimagnesium nonahydro pentaoxoundecaborate)
70. Pretulite (zircon: IMA1996-024) 8.AD.35
  (IUPAC: scandium phosphate)
71. Prewittite (selenite: IMA2002-041) 4.JG. [no]
72. Příbramite (chalcostibite: IMA2015-127) 2.0 [no] [no]
  (IUPAC: copper antimony diselenide)
73. Priceite (Y: 1873) 6.EB.25
  (IUPAC: dicalcium pentahydro heptaoxopentaborate monohydrate)
74. Priderite (hollandite, coronadite: 1951) 4.DK.05b
  (IUPAC: potassium (heptatitanium iron(III) hexadecaoxide)
75. Princivalleite (tourmaline: IMA2020-056) 9.CK. [no] [no]
76. Pringleite (IMA1992-010) 6.GD.05
77. Priscillagrewite-(Y) (garnet: IMA2020-002) 4.0 [no] [no]
  (IUPAC: (dicalcium yttrium) dizirconium tri(aluminium tetraoxide))
78. Prismatine (IMA1996 s.p., 1886 Rd) 9.BJ.50 [no]
79. Probertite (Y: 1929) 6.EB.15
  (IUPAC: sodium calcium tetrahydro heptaoxopentaborate trihydrate)
80. Proshchenkoite-(Y) (okanoganite: IMA2008-007) 9.AJ.35 [no]
81. Prosopite (Y: 1853) 3.CD.10
  (IUPAC: calcium alumino octa(fluoride,hydro))
82. Prosperite (IMA1978-028) 8.CA.60
  (IUPAC: dicalcium tetrazinc tetrarsenate monohydrate)
83. Protasite (IMA1984-001) 4.GB.10
  (IUPAC: barium triuranyl dihydro trioxide trihydrate)
84. Proto-anthophyllite [Mg-Fe-Mn-amphibole: IMA2012 s.p., protoanthophyllite (IMA2001-065)] 9.DD.05 [no]
85. Protocaseyite (decavanadate: IMA2020-090) [no] [no]
86. Protochabournéite (chabournéite: IMA2011-054) 2.0 [no] [no]
  (Tl_{2}Pb(Sb,As)_{10}S_{17})
87. Protoenstatite (pyroxene: IMA2016-117) 9.DA. [no] [no]
  (IUPAC: dimagnesium hexaoxodisilicate)
88. Proto-ferro-anthophyllite [Mg-Fe-Mn-amphibole: IMA2012 s.p., protoferro-anthophyllite (IMA1986-006)] 9.DD.05 [no]
89. Proto-ferro-suenoite [Mg-Fe-Mn-amphibole: IMA2013 s.p., proto-mangano-ferro-anthophyllite (IMA1986-007)] 9.DD.05 [no] [no]
90. Proudite (IMA1975-028) 2.JB.25d
  (Cu_{2}Pb_{16}Bi_{20}(S,Se)_{47})
91. Proustite (Y: 1832) 2.GA.05
  (IUPAC: trisilver sulfarsenite)
92. Proxidecagonite (IMA2018-038) 1.0 [no] [no]
93. Przhevalskite^{Q} (Y: 1956) 8.EB.10
  (IUPAC: lead diuranyl diphosphate tetrahydrate)
94. Pseudoboleite (IMA2007 s.p., 1895) 3.DB.10
95. Pseudobrookite (IMA1988 s.p., 1878 Rd) 4.CB.15
  (IUPAC: (diiron(III) titanium) pentaoxide)
96. Pseudocotunnite^{Q} (Y: 1873) 3.DC.90
  (IUPAC: dipotassium lead tetrachloride (?))
97. Pseudodickthomssenite (sodalite: IMA2021-027) [no] [no]
98. Pseudograndreefite (IMA1988-017) 7.BD.65
  (IUPAC: hexalead sulfate decafluoride)
99. Pseudojohannite (IMA2000-019) 7.EC.20 [no]
  (IUPAC: tricopper dihydro [tetrauranyl tetraoxodisulfate] dodecahydrate)
100. Pseudolaueite (stewartite, laueite: 1956) 8.DC.30
  (IUPAC: manganese(II) diiron(III) dihydro diphosphate octahydrate)
101. Pseudolyonsite (howardevansite: IMA2009-062) 8.AB.35 [no]
  (IUPAC: tricopper divanadate)
102. Pseudomalachite (Y: 1813) 8.BD.05
  (IUPAC: pentacopper tetrahydro diphosphate)
103. Pseudomarkeyite (IMA2018-114) 5.0 [no] [no]
  (IUPAC: octacalcium tetrauranyl dodecacarbonate henicosahydrate)
104. Pseudomeisserite-(NH4) (IMA2018-166) 7.0 [no] [no]
105. Pseudopomite (heteropolyvanadate: IMA2021-064) 4.H0. [no] [no]
106. Pseudorutile (tivanite: IMA1994 s.p., 1966 Rd) 4.CB.25
  (IUPAC: diiron(III) trititanium(IV) nonaoxide)
107. Pseudosinhalite (IMA1997-014) 6.AC.10
  (IUPAC: dimagnesium trialuminium hydro nonaoxodiborate)
108. Pseudowollastonite (IMA1962 s.p., 1959) 9.CA.20 [no] [no]
  (IUPAC: calcium trioxosilicate)
109. Pucherite (scheelite: 1871) 8.AD.40
  (IUPAC: bismuth vanadate)
110. Pumpellyite (pumpellyite) 9.BG.20
  (IUPAC: dicalcium metal dialuminium di(hydroxyl,oxy) heptaoxodisilicate tetraoxosilicate monohydrate)
  1. Pumpellyite-(Al) (IMA2005-016) 9.BG.20 [no]
  2. Pumpellyite-(Fe2+) (IMA1973 s.p., IMA1972-003) 9.BG.20
  3. Pumpellyite-(Fe3+) (IMA1973 s.p., IMA1972-003a) 9.BG.20
  4. Pumpellyite-(Mg) (IMA1973 s.p., 1925) 9.BG.20
  5. Pumpellyite-(Mn2+) (IMA1980-006) 9.BG.20
111. Puninite (euchlorine: IMA2015-012) 7.0 [no] [no]
  (IUPAC: disodium tricopper oxotrisulfate)
112. Punkaruaivite (IMA2008-018) 9.DB.15
  (IUPAC: lithium {dititanium dihydroxyl [undecaoxytetrasilicate monohydroxyl]} monohydrate)
113. Purpurite (olivine: 1905) 8.AB.10
  (IUPAC: (manganese(III),iron(III)) phosphate)
114. Pushcharovskite (IMA1995-048) 8.CA.55
115. Putnisite (IMA2011-106) 5.0 [no]
116. Putoranite (chalcopyrite: IMA1979-054) 02.CB.10b
  (Cu_{1.1}Fe_{1.2}S_{2})
117. Putzite (argyrodite: IMA2002-024) 2.BA.70
  (IUPAC: octa(copper,silver) hexasulfa germanide)
118. Pyatenkoite-(Y) (IMA1995-034) 9.DM.10 [no]
  (IUPAC: pentasodium yttrium titanium octadecaoxyhexasilicate hexahydrate)
119. Pyracmonite (IMA2008-029) 7.AC.08 [no]
  (IUPAC: triammonium iron trisulfate)
120. Pyradoketosite (IMA2019-132) 2.0 [no] [no]
  (IUPAC: trisilver sulfantimonite)
121. Pyrargyrite (Y: 1831) 2.GA.05
  (IUPAC: trisilver sulfantimonite)
122. Pyrite (pyrite: old) 2.EB.05a
  (IUPAC: iron disulfide)
123. Pyroaurite (hydrotalcite: 1866 Rd) 5.DA.50
  (IUPAC: hexamagnesium diiron(III) hexadecahydro carbonate tetrahydrate)
124. Pyrobelonite (descloizite: 1919) 8.BH.40
  (IUPAC: lead manganese(II) hydro vanadate)
125. (Pyrochlore group (A_{2}Nb_{2}(O,OH)_{6}Z), pyrochlore supergroup )
126. Pyrochroite (brucite: 1864) 4.FE.05
  (IUPAC: manganese(II) dihydroxide)
127. Pyrolusite (rutile: IMA1982 s.p., 1827) 4.DB.05
  (IUPAC: manganese(IV) dioxide)
128. Pyromorphite (apatite: 1813) 8.BN.05
  (IUPAC: pentalead chloro triphosphate)
129. Pyrope (garnet, garnet: 1803) 9.AD.25
  (IUPAC: trimagnesium dialuminium tri(tetraoxosilicate))
130. Pyrophanite (corundum: 1890) 4.CB.05
  (IUPAC: manganese(II) titanium trioxide)
131. Pyrophyllite (pyrophyllite: 1829) 9.EC.10
  (IUPAC: dialuminium decaoxotetrasilicate dihydroxyl)
132. Pyrosmalite 09.EE.10
  1. Pyrosmalite-(Fe) (IMA1985-L, 1808) 9.EE.10
    (IUPAC: octairon(II) pentadecaoxohexasilicate decahydroxyl)
  2. Pyrosmalite-(Mn) (IMA2007 s.p., 1953) 9.EE.10
    (IUPAC: octamanganese(II) pentadecaoxohexasilicate deca(hydroxyl,chlorine))
133. Pyrostilpnite (xanthoconite: 1868) 2.GA.10
  (IUPAC: trisilver sulfantimonite)
134. Pyroxferroite (IMA1970-001) 9.DO.05
  (IUPAC: iron(II) trioxosilicate)
135. Pyroxmangite (Y: 1913) 9.DO.05
  (IUPAC: manganese(II) trioxosilicate)
136. Pyrrhotite (nickeline: 1835) 2.CC.10
  (IUPAC: heptairon octasulfide)

== Q ==
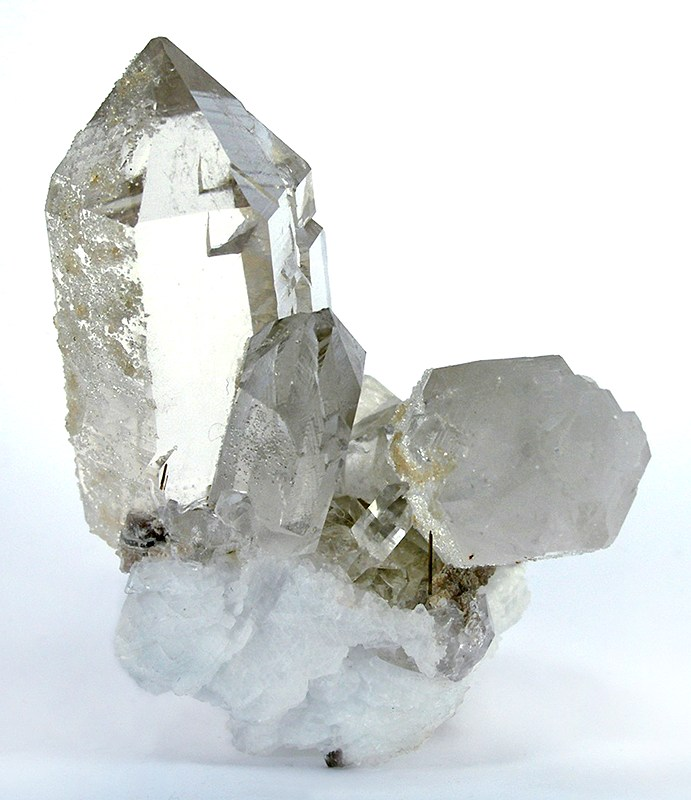
Quartz on albite Marilac, Minas Gerais, Southeast Region, Brazil

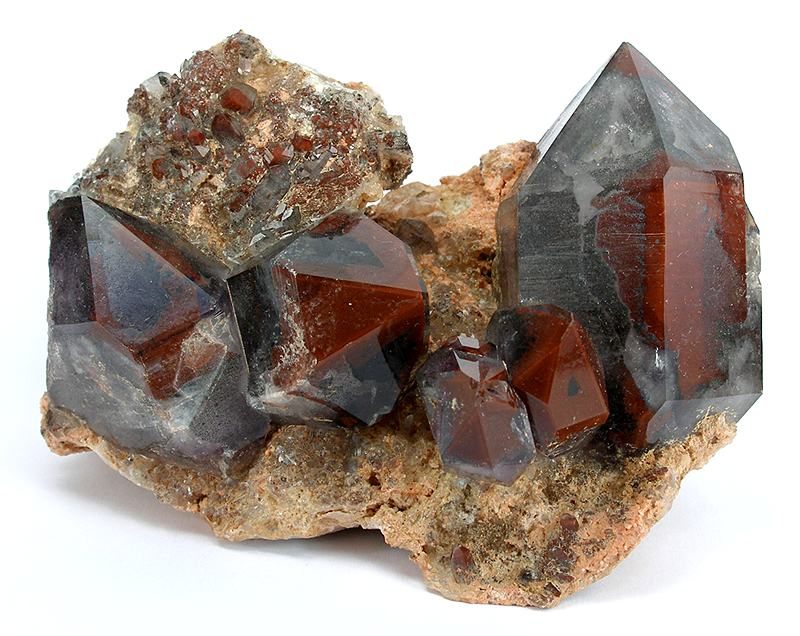
Quartz (var. amethyst) included with hematite

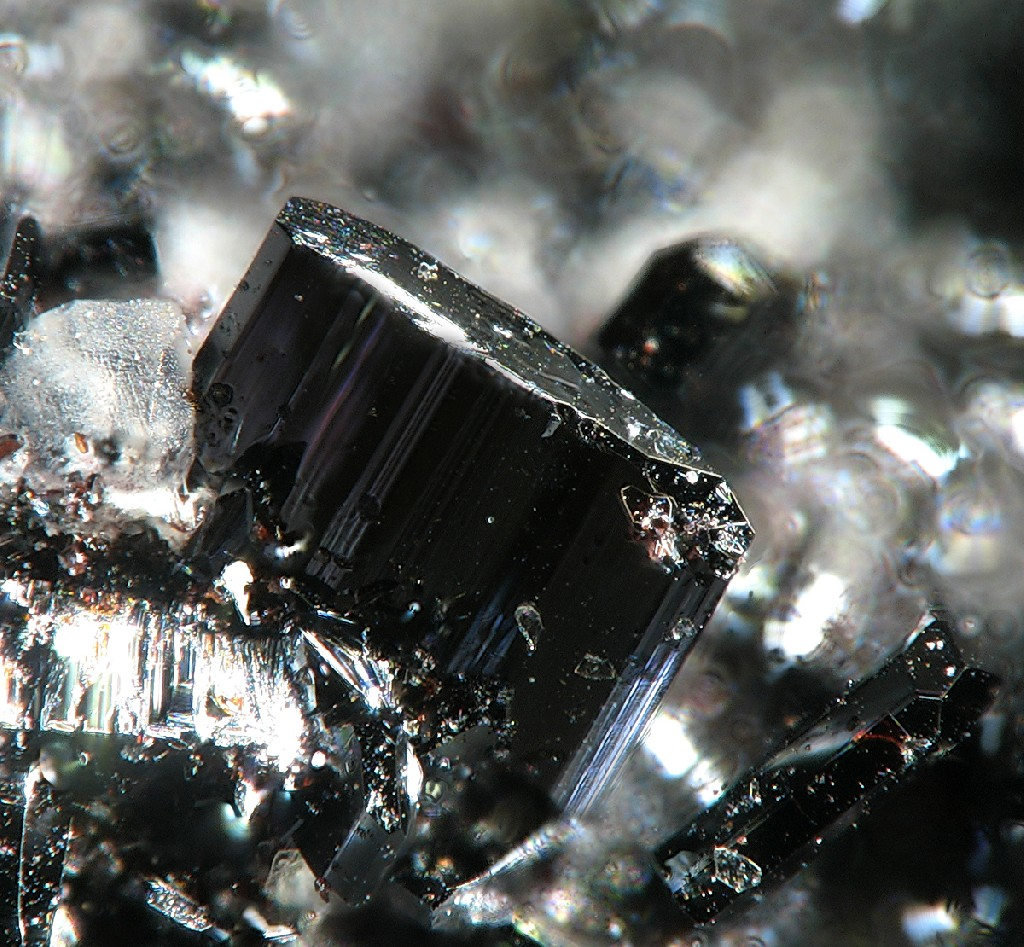
Quenselite found in Sweden.

1. Qandilite (spinel, spinel: IMA1980-046) 4.BB.05
2. Qaqarssukite-(Ce) (IMA2004-019) 5.BD.25 [no]
  (IUPAC: barium cerium fluoro dicarbonate)
3. Qatranaite (IMA2016-024) 4.FM.50 [no] [no]
4. Qeltite (IMA2021-032) 9.HA. [no] [no]
5. Qilianshanite (IMA1992-008) 6.H0.55
  (IUPAC: sodium tetrahydrogen carbonate borate dihydrate)
6. Qingheiite (alluaudite, wyllieite: IMA1981-051) 8.AC.15
  (IUPAC: sodium manganese (magnesium aluminium) triphosphate)
7. Qingsongite (nitride: IMA2013-030) 1.BC. [no] [no]
  (IUPAC: cubic boron nitride, borazon)
8. Qitianlingite (columbite: IMA1983-075) 4.DB.35
9. Quadrandorite (lillianite: andorite IV and sundtit, 1893, 1954) 2.JB.40a
10. Quadratite (IMA1994-038) 2.GC.25 [no]
11. Quadridavyne (cancrinite: IMA1990-054) 9.FB.05
12. Quadruphite (seidozerite, murmanite: IMA1990-026) 9.BE.45
  (IUPAC: octasodium di(calcio,sodio) tetrasodium tetratitanium di(heptaoxodisilicate) tetraphosphate tetraoxy difluoride)
13. Quartz (quartz: IMA1967 s.p., 1546) 4.DA.05
  (IUPAC: dioxysilicate)
14. Queitite (IMA1978-029) 9.BF.20
  (IUPAC: dizinc tetralead tetraoxysilicate heptaoxodisilicate sulfate)
15. Quenselite (Y: 1925) 4.FE.30
  (IUPAC: lead manganese(III) hydro dioxide)
16. Quenstedtite (Y: 1888) 7.CB.65
  (IUPAC: diiron(III) trisulfate undecahydrate)
17. Quetzalcoatlite (IMA1973-010) 4.FE.45
18. Quijarroite (IMA2016-052) 2.LB.50 [no] [no]
  (Cu_{6}HgPb_{2}Bi_{4}Se_{12})
19. Quintinite (hydrotalcite: IMA1992-028, IMA1992-029) 5.DA.40 [no]
  (IUPAC: tetramagnesium dialuminium dodecahydroxide carbonate trihydrate)
20. Qusongite (carbide: IMA2007-034) 1.BA.25 [no]
  (IUPAC: tungsten carbide)
