= Fleischerite =

Lead germanium sulphate mineral

General
- Category: Sulfate minerals
- Formula: Pb3Ge(SO4)2(OH)6 · 3H2O
- IMA symbol: fsh
- Strunz classification: 7.DF.25
- Dana classification: 31.07.06.03 (hydrated silicates containing hydroxyl or halogen)
- Crystal system: Hexagonal

Identification
- Color: White, light reddish-pink
- Crystal habit: Accicular
- Tenacity: brittle
- Mohs scale hardness: 2.5-3
- Luster: Sub-vitreous, silky
- Streak: White
- Density: 4.3
- Birefringence: 0.029
- Pleochroism: Non-pleochroic

Fleischerite is a white to light-reddish pink sulfate mineral. It is named after Michael Fleischer, a co-founder of the International Mineralogical Association. Fleischerite was first recognized as a mineral in 1960. Fleischerite is the namesake of its own mineral group, which also includes schaurteite, despujolsite, mallestigite, and genplesite. It is often confused with dundasite.

== Occurrence ==
Fleischerite is found only in Tsumeb (Ongopolo) Mine, Namibia. It forms in oxidized portions of a dolostone-hosted hydrothermal germanium-bearing polymetallic ore deposits. The oldest samples are estimated to be 541 million years old.

== Appearance ==
Fleischerite crystals are very thin and up to 1.5 cm in length. They have a tender reddish hue and form sheets of subparallel individuals or hedgehog-like aggregates.

== Paragenesis with other minerals ==
1. When fleischerite, cerussite, and mimetite cover a tennantite matrix, they create a rounded, matte white concretion.
2. When a dolostone core is covered with plumbojarosite and mimetite, which give it a greenish hue, fleischerite grows on top of them all.
3. Rarely, fleischerite enters paragenesis with alamosite, anglesite, hematite, leadhillite, melanotekite, mimetite, kegelite, larsenite, plumbojarosite, plumbotsumite and queitite.
4. Fleischerite also may have paragenesis with other secondary germanium minerals.
