= Kegelite =

Phyllosilicate mineral

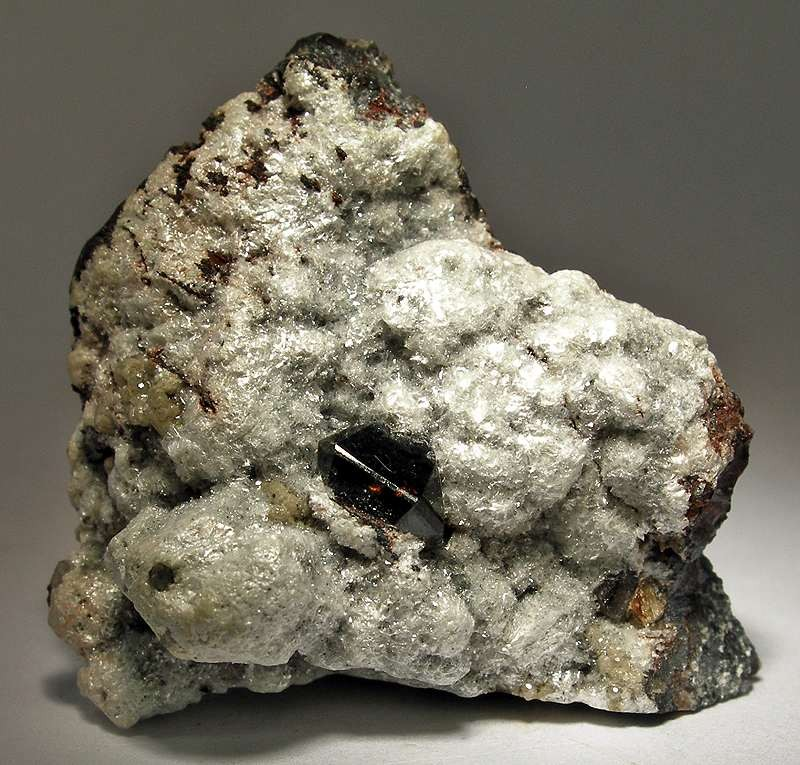
- Kegelite microcrystals with a 1 cm. siderite crystal at right, from the type locality

General
- Category: Phyllosilicate minerals
- Formula: Pb_{8}Al_{4}Si_{8}O_{20}(SO_{4})_{2}(CO_{3})_{4}(OH)_{8}
- IMA symbol: Keg
- Strunz classification: 9.EC.80
- Dana classification: 71.05.01.01
- Crystal system: Monoclinic; Unknown space group

Identification
- Color: Colorless to white
- Crystal habit: Pseudohexagonal plates in spherical aggregates
- Cleavage: Perfect on {100}
- Tenacity: Extremely flexible
- Mohs scale hardness: no data
- Luster: Vitreous
- Streak: White
- Diaphaneity: Transparent to translucent
- Specific gravity: 4.5
- Optical properties: Biaxial (-)
- Refractive index: n = 1.81 parallel to {100}

Kegelite is a complex silicate mineral with formula Pb_{8}Al_{4}Si_{8}O_{20}(SO_{4})_{2}(CO_{3})_{4}(OH)_{8}.

It was first described in 1975 for an occurrence in the Tsumeb Mine, Tsumeb, Otjikoto Region, Namibia and named for Friedrich Wilhelm Kegel (1874–1948), Director of mining operations at Tsumeb. It occurs in a deeply oxidized polymetallic ore deposits in Tsumeb. Associated minerals include quartz, galena, mimetite, hematite, leadhillite, anglesite, fleischerite, melanotekite and alamosite. It has also been reported from the Zeehan district in Tasmania and from Tune, Sarpsborg, Østfold, Norway.
