= Genplesite =

General
- Category: Sulfate mineral
- Formula: Ca_{3}Sn(SO_{4})_{2}(OH)_{6}•3H_{2}O
- IMA symbol: Gpl
- Crystal system: Hexagonal
- Crystal class: Dihexagonal dipyramidal (6mmm); H-M symbol: (6/m 2/m 2/m)
- Space group: P6_{3}/mmc
- Unit cell: a = 8.51, c = 11.14 [Å] (approximated)

Identification

Genplesite is a very rare tin mineral coming from the Oktyabr'skoe deposit in the Noril'sk area, Russia, which is known for nickel and platinum group elements minerals. Its chemical formula is Ca_{3}Sn(SO_{4})_{2}(OH)_{6}•3H_{2}O. Genplesite is a member of the fleischerite group, and it is a calcium and tin-analogue of fleischerite. It is hexagonal, with space group P6_{3}/mmc.
