= Friedrich Wilhelm Kegel =

Friedrich Wilhelm Kegel (1874–1948), from 1924 to 1933 director of the mining operations at Tsumeb mine, Namibia. He was German until his naturalisation in South West Africa. After his resignation he lived in Switzerland. He visited the Tsumeb mine from December 1938 until March 1939 and from February 1940 until March 1940 as a consultant for the Otavi Mining Company.

The mineral Kegelite, discovered in the Tsumeb mine, was named after him by American volcanologist David Richardson.

Kegel took the first published photograph of the Hoba meteorite.

== See also ==
- Kegelite
- Tsumeb
- Otavi Mining and Railway Company
- Hoba meteorite
