= Plavnoite =

Rare complex uranium sulfate mineral

General
- Category: Sulfate
- Formula: K_{0.8}Mn_{0.6}[(UO_{2})_{2}O_{2}(SO_{4})]•3.5H_{2}O
- IMA symbol: Pvn
- Crystal system: Monoclinic
- Crystal class: Prismatic (2/m) (same H-M symbol)
- Space group: C2/m
- Unit cell: a = 8.63, b = 14.28, c = 8.86 [Å], β = 104.04° (approximated)

Identification
- Other characteristics: Radioactive

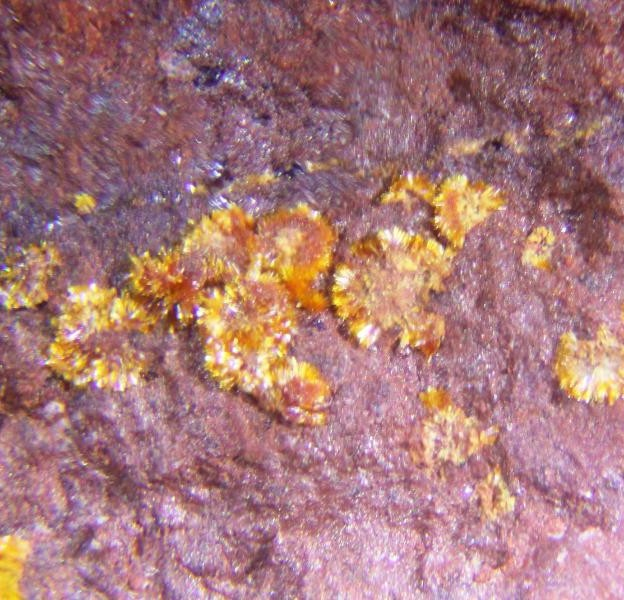

Plavnoite is a rare complex uranium sulfate mineral with the formula K_{0.8}Mn_{0.6}[(UO_{2})_{2}O_{2}(SO_{4})]•3.5H_{2}O. Typically for the secondary uranium mineral, plavnoite contains uranyl groups. It was discovered in the Plavno mine in Jáchymov, Czech Republic. The Jáchymov site is known as a type locality for many rare and unique minerals.

== Relation to other minerals ==
Although related to zippeite, plavnoite is chemically unique.
