= Queitite =

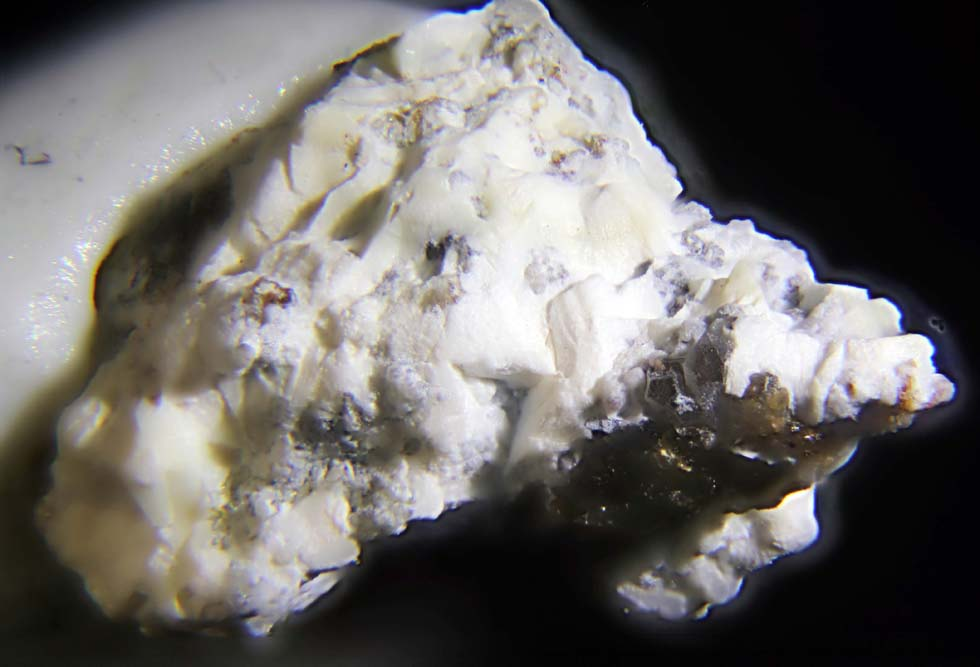

General
- Category: Minerals
- Formula: Pb_{4}Zn_{2}(SO_{4})(SiO_{4})(Si_{2}O_{7})
- IMA symbol: Que
- Strunz classification: 9.BF.20
- Dana classification: 58.1.3.1
- Crystal system: Monoclinic
- Crystal class: Sphenoidal; H-M Symbol: 2
- Space group: P2_{1}
- Unit cell: 719.46

Identification
- Color: Colorless, White, Pale Yellow
- Twinning: {100} and {001}
- Cleavage: Indistinct on {010} and {001}
- Mohs scale hardness: 4
- Luster: Greasy
- Streak: White
- Diaphaneity: Transparent
- Specific gravity: 6.07
- Density: 6.07
- Optical properties: Biaxial (+)
- Refractive index: n_{α} = 1.899(4) n_{β} = 1.901 n_{γ} = 1.903(4)
- Birefringence: 0.004
- 2V angle: Measured: 90° Calculated: 88°
- Dispersion: Extreme r < v

Major varieties
- Calcian queitite: Ca_{4}Zn_{2}(SO_{4})(SiO_{4})(Si_{2}O_{7})

Queitite is a lead zinc silicate sulphate that was named after the mineral dealer Clive S. Queit, who collected the first specimens. It got approved by the IMA in 1979, and it is an extremely rare secondary mineral.

== Properties ==
When discovered at 1979 in Tsumeb, Namibia, Keller described the mineral occurring on a matrix, having euhedral bladed crystals - crystals with well defined smooth faces. Later on a cavity was discovered which contained queitite. The cavity's specimens were druzy and white, forming botryoidal crystals - crystals with a spherical habit. These crystals formed a 0.5 mm thick encrustation, and had a silky, fibrous structure. Queitite does not show any radioactive properties. It mainly consists of lead (62.98%) and oxygen (18.24%), but otherwise contains zinc (9.94%), silicon (6.40%) and sulfur (2.44%). Calcian queitite is the calcium bearing variant of queitite. Instead of lead, it contains calcium in its formula. This queitite variant was originally reported from the Lucky Cuss Mine, Arizona, USA. It was observed to be white and chalky, replacing the alamosite in the mine. It is described as having spheluritic modules.

== Localities and occurrences ==
It is a type locality of Tsumeb mine, Namibia, but it is also mined at Red Gill mine, England, and in the Penrhiw Mine, Ceredigion. However, there was one occurrence in Wales, of a single specimen displaying microscopic crystal sprays. The mineral was collected in a small section of dumps from weathered veinstone. In its type locality, it is associated with quartz, galena, sphalerite, melanotektite, willemite, leadhillite, alamosite, larsenite and tennantite. In the Red Gill mine, it appears with quartz, leadhillite, cerussite, caledonite and susannite. It occurs in a partially oxidized lead ore on corroded sulfides from a dolostone-hosted hydrothermal polymetallic ore deposit, or from a hydrothermal lead-zinc-copper ore deposit in a vug in quartz, with other oxidized lead-copper minerals. In Tsumeb, it grows into bladed crystals on a matrix of lead-copper ores. It also occurs in post-mining oxidation and weathering deposits. It can also form through post-mining alteration of lead-zinc ore. It is a supergene mineral, meaning it grows close to the surface.
