= Phosphophyllite =

Phosphate mineral (Zn2Fe(PO4)2 . 4H2O)

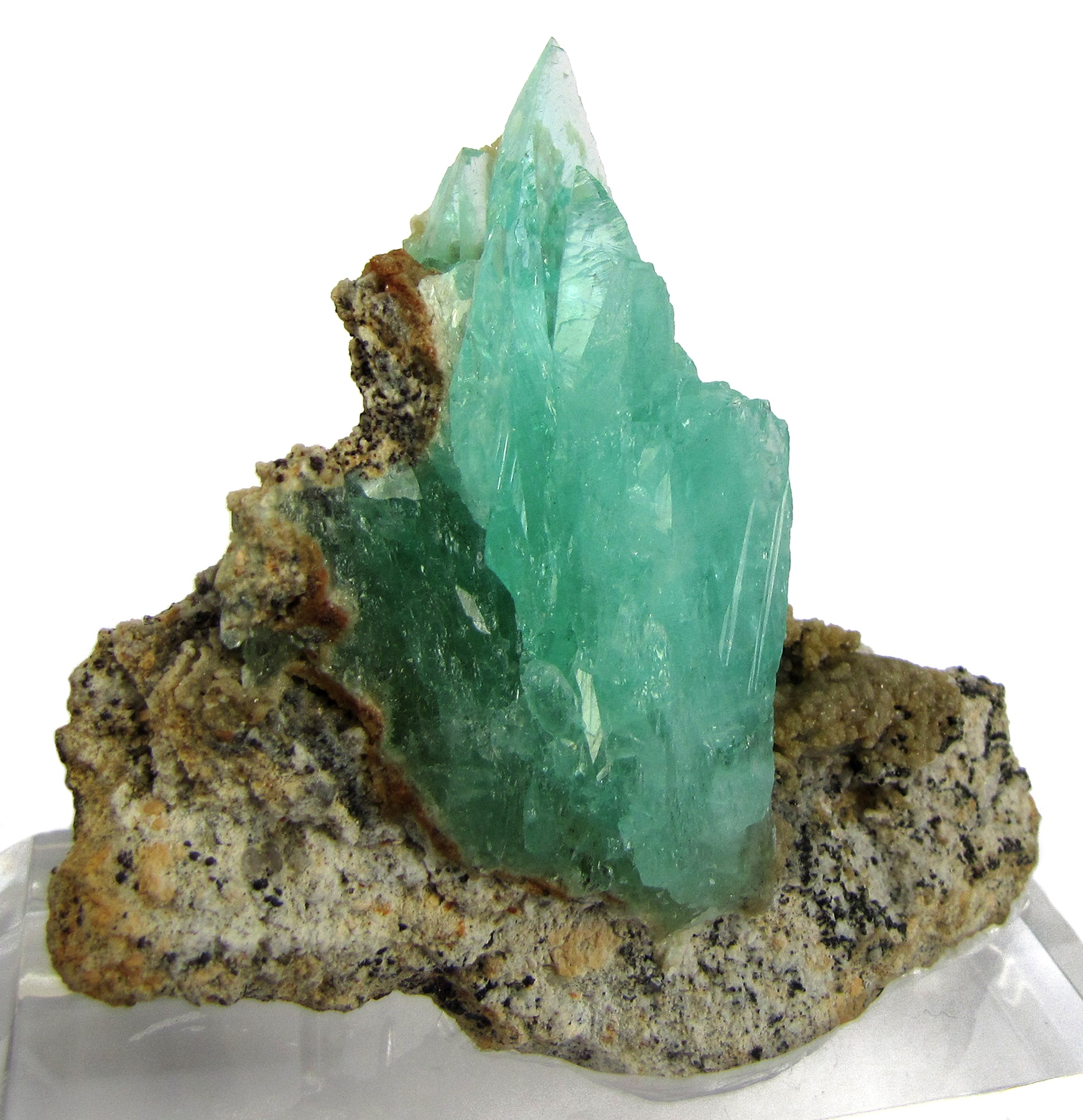

General
- Category: Phosphate minerals
- Formula: Zn_{2}Fe(PO_{4})_{2}·4H_{2}O
- IMA symbol: Pp
- Strunz classification: 8.CA.40
- Crystal system: Monoclinic
- Crystal class: Prismatic (2/m) (same H-M symbol)
- Space group: P2_{1}/c

Identification
- Formula mass: 448.40 g/mol
- Color: Blue-green to colourless
- Crystal habit: Prismatic
- Twinning: Common
- Cleavage: [100] Perfect, [010] Distinct, [102] Distinct
- Fracture: Conchoidal
- Mohs scale hardness: 3.5
- Luster: Vitreous
- Streak: White
- Diaphaneity: Transparent
- Specific gravity: 3.1
- Optical properties: Biaxial (−)
- Refractive index: n_{α} = 1.595–1.599, n_{β} = 1.614–1.617, n_{γ} = 1.616–1.620
- Birefringence: 0.021
- 2V angle: Measured 44°, Calculated 34°
- Common impurities: Manganese

Phosphophyllite is a rare phosphate mineral with the chemical formula Zn_{2}Fe(PO_{4})_{2}·4H_{2}O. It is prized among mineral collectors for its delicate bluish green colour, but rarely cut due to its difficult properties.

== Geology ==
Phosphophyllite was first described in 1920 by Heinrich Laubmann and Hermann Steinmetz. The name derives from Ancient Greek phyllon 'leaf', and phosphate.

Chemically, phosphophyllite is related to zinc phosphate with some zinc substituted by iron. Phosphophyllite has been synthesized by the addition of diammonium phosphate to a solution of zinc and iron sulfate.

== Occurrence ==
The finest phosphophyllite crystals come from Potosí, Bolivia, but it is no longer mined there. Other sources include New Hampshire, United States and Hagendorf, Bavaria, Germany. It is often found in association with the minerals chalcopyrite and triphylite.

== Uses ==
Phosphophyllite is highly valued by collectors for its rarity and delicate bluish green colour. Brittleness and fragility as well as the intrinsic value of large crystals make it unsuitable for jewellery.

== Popular culture ==
An anthropomorphic form of phosphophyllite is the protagonist of the manga and anime series Land of the Lustrous, with key features of the mineral such as its brittle nature and vibrant color reflected in their character traits and design.
