= Peretaite =

Sulfate of antimony and calcium

General
- Category: Sulfate
- Formula: Ca(SbO)_{2}(SO_{4})_{2}(OH)_{2} · 2H_{2}O
- IMA symbol: Pta
- Crystal system: Monoclinic

Identification
- Color: Colorless, can be pink
- Crystal habit: Prismatic crystals
- Twinning: Very common on {100}
- Cleavage: Perfect on {100}
- Mohs scale hardness: 3.5-4
- Luster: Vitreous
- Streak: White
- Diaphaneity: Transparent
- Specific gravity: 4.06
- Density: 3.8 g/cm^{3}
- Optical properties: biaxial positive
- Refractive index: n_{α}= 1.686 n_{β}= 1.694 n_{γ}= 1.709
- Pleochroism: Strong with colors pink(γ') to green(α')
- Ultraviolet fluorescence: No

Peretaite is a sulfate of antimony and calcium. The mineral, Ca(SbO)_{4}(SO_{4})_{2}(OH)_{2} (2(H_{2}O)), was named Peretaite for its locality. It was first discovered in an antimony-bearing vein at Pereta, Tuscany, Italy.

== Occurrence ==
Peretaite occurs in only small quantities, as aggregates of tabular crystals. The crystals are found in the geodes of a deeply silicified limestone. It also occurs in the cavities of columnar stibnite. Other associated minerals are stibnite, quartz, calcite, pyrite, valentinite, kermesite, sulfur, and gypsum. Peretaite can often be red from the inclusion of valentinite. The mineral was formed by the action of sulfuric acid on the stibnite; peretaite is closer to the boundary of the country rock limestone, which is the source of the calcium in peretaite.

== Physical properties ==
The mineral peretaite has transparent crystals that are colorless. It has a vitreous luster and perfect {100} cleavage. The density of peretaite was determined by a heavy-liquid method, crystals tend to float in a Clerici solution, which has a density of 4.0 g/cm^{3}, therefore the density is 3.8 g/cm^{3}.

== Chemical properties ==
The mineral is made up of 4 oxides. Most of this mineral is made up of an Antimony oxide, Calcium, and a sulfur oxide. Some of the qualitative analyses of peretaite were done by an ORTEC X-ray microanalyzer and an ARL SEMQ electron microprobe. Later it was discovered that the crystals would disintegrate under the electron beam. Therefore, a wet chemical analysis was performed for the sulfur content, calcium was determined by atomic absorption, and antimony was determined by alternating current anodic stripping voltammetry.

Chemical Analysis in Weight %
Oxide	Ideal weight percentage	Analytical Results
Sb_{2}O_{3}	68.31	69.09
CaO	6.58	6.44
SO_{3}	18.78	17.62
H_{2}O	6.33	6.0

== Crystallography ==
X-ray single-crystal study indicated peretaite had a symmetry of 2/m with a space group of C2/c or Cc and a crystal system of monoclinic.

== See also ==
- List of minerals recognized by the International Mineralogical Association
- Classification of non-silicate minerals
