= Pseudowollastonite =

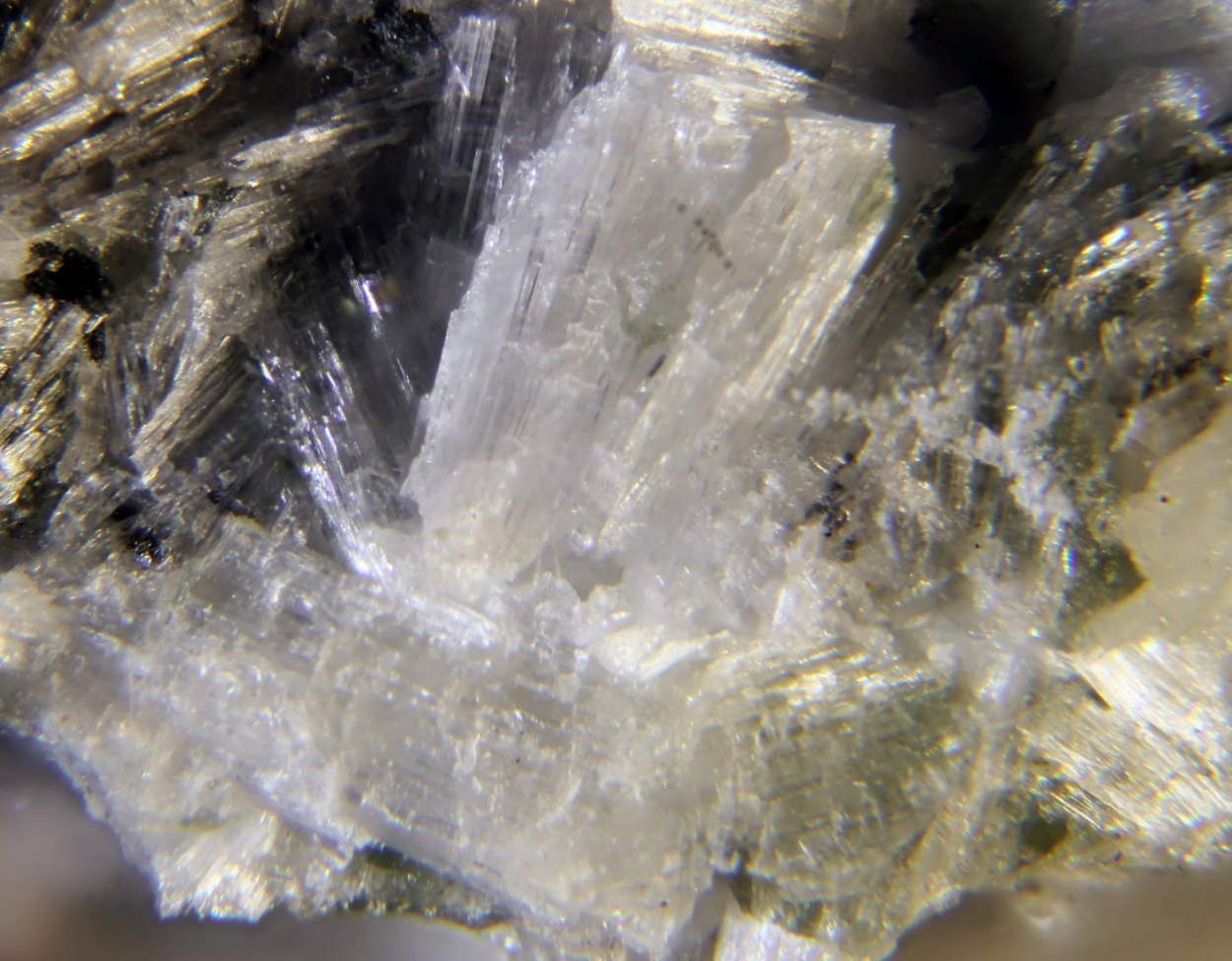
- White crystals of pseudowollastonite from Passau, Lower Bavaria, Germany

General
- Category: Cyclosilicate
- IMA symbol: Pwo
- Strunz classification: 9.CA.20
- Crystal system: Monoclinic
- Crystal class: Prismatic (2/m) (same H-M symbol)
- Space group: C2/c

Identification
- Luster: Vitreous
- Diaphaneity: Transparent

Pseudowollastonite is a high-temperature mineral phase of CaSiO_{3} and is polymorphous with wollastonite. Its formula can alternatively be written as Ca_{3}Si_{3}O_{9}. Other names include ß-Wollastonite, and cyclowollastonite.

It occurs in high temperature (pyrometamorphic) environments such as the Hatrurim Formation of the Negev Desert and the graphite mine at Pfaffenrenth near Hauzenberg, Bavaria. It also occurs in slags and cement.
