= Pellyite =

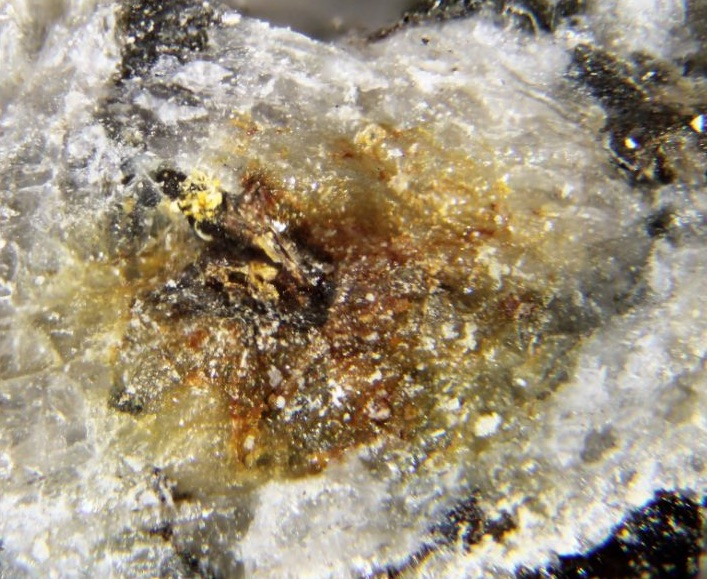

General
- Category: Minerals
- Formula: Ba_{2}Ca(Fe,Mg)_{2}Si_{6}O_{17}

Identification
- Color: colorless, pale yellow
- Melting point: 900 ± 15°C

Pellyite is a mineral that belongs to the silicate class. Its chemical formula is Ba_{2}Ca(Fe,Mg)_{2}Si_{6}O_{17}. It is named after the Pelly River in Yukon, Canada.
