= Plancheite =

Hydrated copper silicate mineral

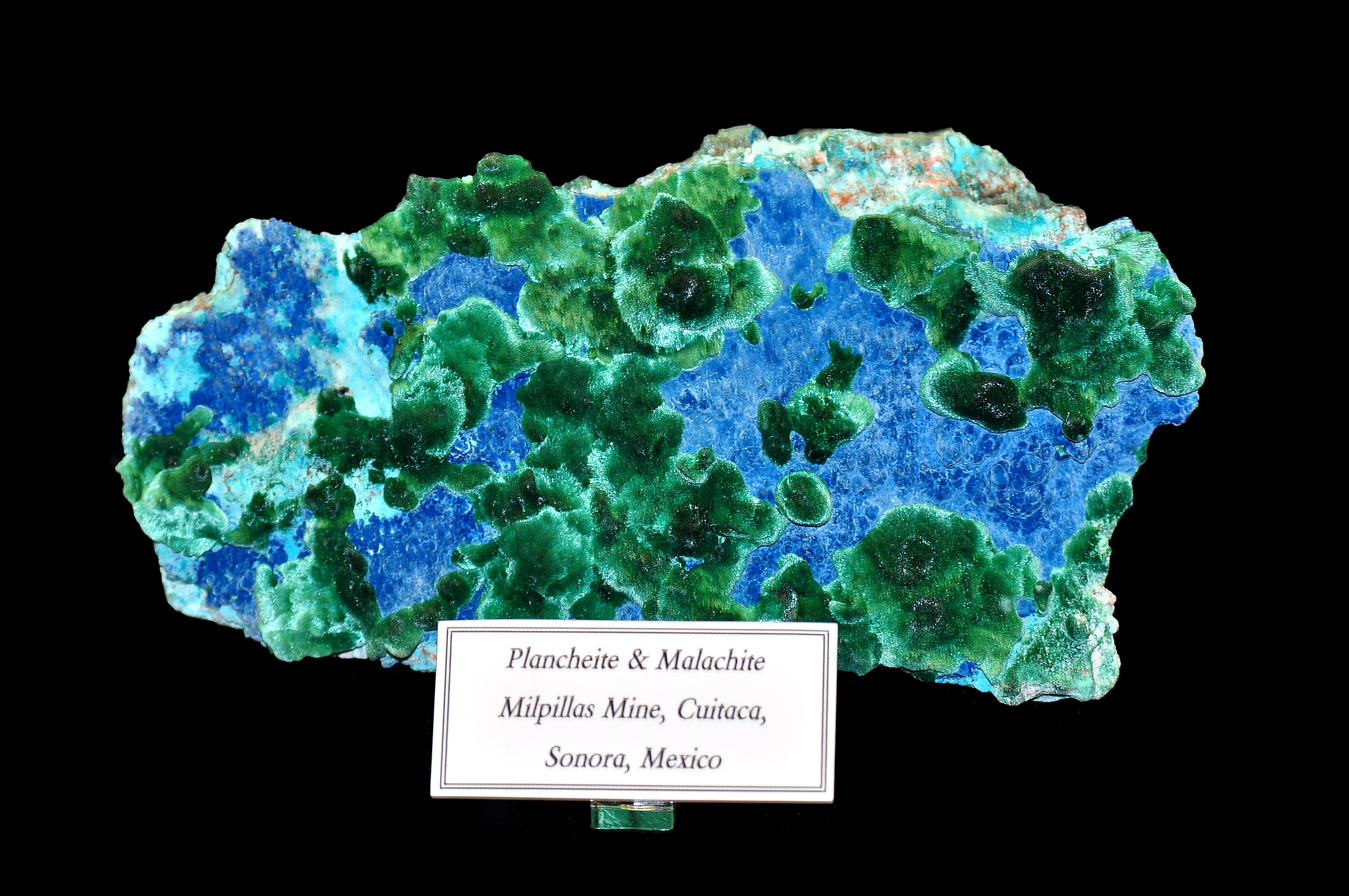
- Plancheite and Malachite, Milpillas mine, Sonora, Mexico

General
- Category: Inosilicate
- Formula: Cu_{8}Si_{8}O_{22}(OH)_{4}•(H_{2}O)
- IMA symbol: Pch
- Strunz classification: 9.DB.35 (10 ed); 8/F.05-10 (8 ed)
- Dana classification: 66.2.1.1
- Crystal system: Orthorhombic
- Crystal class: Dipyramidal (mmm); H-M symbol: (2/m 2/m 2/m)
- Space group: Orthorhombic; Space group: Pcnb

Identification
- Formula mass: 1,171 g/mol
- Color: Pale blue, light blue, dark green
- Crystal habit: Acicular, Fibrous, or Radial
- Cleavage: None observed
- Mohs scale hardness: 5.5 to 6
- Luster: Vitreous to silky
- Streak: Light blue
- Diaphaneity: Translucent to opaque
- Specific gravity: 3.6 to 3.8
- Optical properties: Biaxial (+)
- Refractive index: Nx = 1.645, Ny = 1.660 Nz = 1.715; Nx = 1.697, Ny = 1.718, Nz = 1.741
- Pleochroism: X colorless or pale blue, Y colorless or blue, Z blue or dark blue
- Other characteristics: Nonfluorescent, nonmagnetic, not radioactive

Plancheite is a hydrated copper silicate mineral with the formula Cu_{8}Si_{8}O_{22}(OH)_{4}•(H_{2}O). It is closely related to shattuckite in structure and appearance, and the two minerals are often confused.

== Structure ==
Plancheite is a chain silicate (inosilicate), with double chains of silica tetrahedra parallel to the c crystal axis. It occurs as sprays of acicular or fibrous radial clusters, with fibers extended parallel to the chains, i.e. along the c crystal axis; it can also form tiny tabular or platy crystals. It is a member of the orthorhombic crystal class m m m (2/m 2/m 2/m), which is the most symmetrical class in the orthorhombic system.

== Properties ==
Usually a pale turquoise-blue, with a pale blue streak and an adamantine to silky luster. It is quite hard, with hardness 5.5 to 6, close to that of feldspar, and specific gravity 3.6 to 3.8. Optically it is biaxial (+), with refractive indices between 1.64 and 1.74, and pleochroic.

== Environment ==
Plancheite is a secondary mineral formed in the oxidized zone of copper deposits, associated with other copper minerals chrysocolla, dioptase, malachite, conichalcite and tenorite. It occurs with primary malachite at the Milpillas Mine in Mexico. The type locality is the Sanda Mine, Mindouli, Pool Region, Republic of Congo.

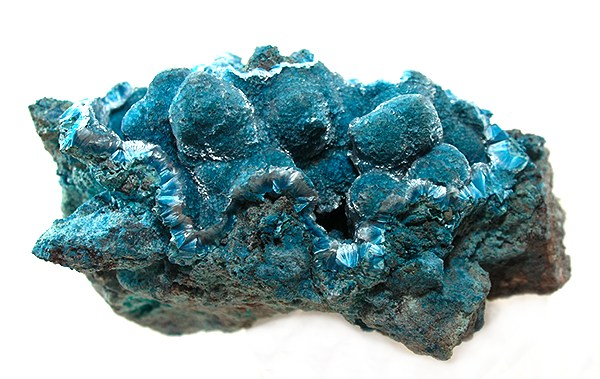
Plancheite, Kolwezi, Katanga (Shaba), Democratic Republic of Congo. 5.9 x 3.2 x 2.6 cm.
