= Alamosite =

Colorless silicate mineral

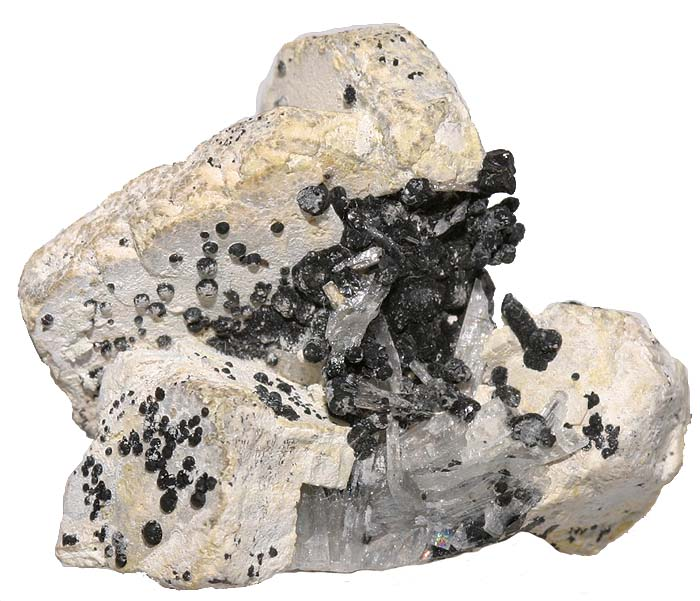
- Transparent crystals of alamosite in the matrix of leadhillite and melanotekite

General
- Category: Inosilicates
- Formula: Pb_{12}Si_{12}O_{36}
- IMA symbol: Aam
- Strunz classification: 9.DO.20
- Dana classification: 65.7.1.1
- Crystal system: Monoclinic
- Crystal class: Prismatic (2/m) (same H-M symbol)
- Space group: P2/c
- Unit cell: a = 11.209, b = 7.041 c = 12.22 [Å]; β = 113.15°; Z = 12

Identification
- Color: Colorless
- Cleavage: {010} perfect
- Mohs scale hardness: 4.5
- Luster: Adamantine
- Streak: White
- Diaphaneity: Transparent to translucent
- Specific gravity: 6.49
- Optical properties: Biaxial (−)
- Refractive index: n_{α} = 1.947, n_{β} = 1.961, n_{γ} = 1.968
- Birefringence: δ = 0.021
- 2V angle: 65° (meas.)

Alamosite (Pb_{12}Si_{12}O_{36}) is a colorless silicate mineral named after the place where it was discovered, Álamos, Sonora, Mexico. It is a rare secondary mineral occurring in the oxidized zones of lead-rich deposits. For example, the infobox picture shows its association with black leadhillite.
