= Manganese phosphate =

Manganese phosphate may refer to:

- Manganese(II) phosphate, Mn_{3}(PO_{4})_{2}
- Manganese(III) phosphate, MnPO_{4}
- Manganese violet, a Manganese(III) ammonium pyrophosphate used as a pigment

Minerals

- Gatehouseite, Mn_{5}(PO_{4})_{2}(OH)_{4}
- Hureaulite, Mn_{5}(PO_{3}OH)_{2}(PO_{4})_{2}·4H_{2}O
- Purpurite, MnPO_{4} with varying amounts of iron depending upon its source
- Waterhouseite, Mn_{7}(PO_{4})_{2}(OH)_{8}

With Li or Na only

- Lithiophilite, LiMnPO_{4}
- Natrophilite, NaMnPO_{4}
- Triphylite, LiFePO_{4} end member of solid solutions with lithiophilite

With Al or B only

- Eosphorite, MnAl(PO_{4})(OH)_{2}·H_{2}O
- Seamanite, rare boron phosphate mineral, Mn_{3}[B(OH)_{4}](PO_{4})(OH)_{2}
- Sinkankasite, H_{2}MnAl(PO_{4})_{2}(OH)·6H_{2}O

Mixed phosphate minerals with iron

- Alluaudite, (Na,Ca)Mn^{2+}(Fe^{3+},Mn^{2+},Fe^{2+},Mg)_{2}(PO_{4})_{3}
- Childrenite, rare, (Fe,Mn)AlPO_{4}(OH)_{2}·H_{2}O
- Falsterite, rare, Ca_{2}MgMn^{2+}_{2}(Fe^{2+}_{0.5}Fe^{3+}_{0.5})_{4}Zn_{4}(PO_{4})_{8}(OH)_{4}(H_{2}O)_{14}
- Ferraioloite, rare, MgMn^{2+}_{4}(Fe^{2+}_{0.5}Al_{0.5})_{4}Zn_{4}(PO_{4})_{8}(OH)_{4}(H_{2}O)_{20}. It is related to falsterite.
- Graftonite, (Fe,Mn,Ca)_{3}(PO_{4})_{2}
- Maneckiite, rare, (Na[])Ca_{2}Fe^{2+}_{2}(Fe^{3+}Mg)Mn_{2}(PO_{4})_{6}·2H_{2}O
- Messelite, Ca_{2}(Fe^{2+},Mn^{2+})(PO_{4})_{2}·2H_{2}O
- Robertsite, Ca_{2}(Mn_{3}(PO_{4})_{3}O_{2})(H_{2}O)_{3})
- Samuelsonite, (Ca,Ba)Ca_{8}Fe^{2+}_{2}Mn^{2+}_{2}Al_{2}[(OH)_{2}(PO_{4})_{10}]
- Switzerite, (Mn,Fe)_{3}(PO_{4})_{2}·7H_{2}O
- Triplite, rare, (Mn,Fe)_{2}PO_{4}(F,OH)
- Triploidite, uncommon, (Mn,Fe)_{2}PO_{4}OH
- Whiteite is a rare hydrated phosphate mineral, with hydroxyl, Fe, Ca
