= Serrabrancaite =

Mineral

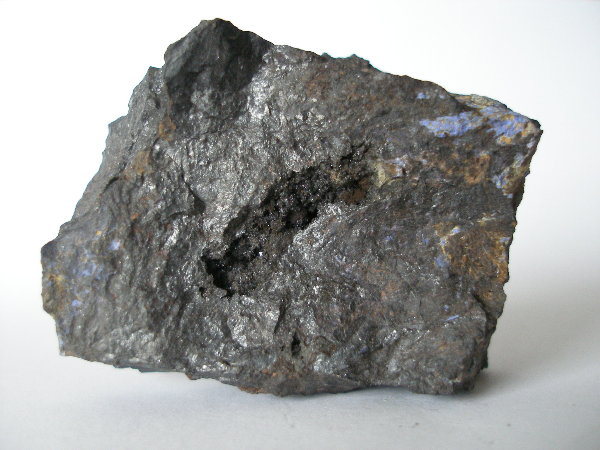
- Small Serrabrancaite crystals in a vug in vernadite (Specimen size: 4.7 cm) Locality: Alto Serra Branca Pegmatite, near Pedra Lavrada, Paraiba, Brazil

General
- Category: Phosphate mineral
- Formula: MnPO_{4}•H_{2}O
- IMA symbol: Sra
- Crystal system: Monoclinic
- Space group: C2/c
- Unit cell: a = 6.914 (2) Å; b = 7.468 (2) Å; c = 7.364 (2) Å; ß = 112.29 (3) °; V = 351.8 (1) Å^{3}

Identification
- Color: Dark brown to dark greenish-black
- Crystal habit: Equant or short prismatic crystals
- Twinning: Not observed
- Cleavage: Not observed
- Fracture: Uneven
- Tenacity: Brittle
- Mohs scale hardness: 3.5
- Luster: Adamantine
- Streak: Olive green
- Density: 3.16 – 3.17 (1) g/cm^{3}
- Refractive index: n_{α} = 1.75 n_{ß} = 1.79 n_{γ} = >1.79
- Pleochroism: Dark brown to olive greenish-brown

Serrabrancaite is a mineral with the chemical formula MnPO_{4}•H_{2}O and which is named for the locality where it was found, the Alto Serra Branca Pegmatite. The Alto Serra Branca mine has been in operation since the 1940s. It is located in Paraiba, Brazil near a village named Pedra Lavrada. Tantalite is the main mineral mined here. Specimens of serrabrancaite are kept in the Mineralogical Collections of both the Bergakademie Freiberg, Germany and the Martin-Luther Universität Halle, Institut für Geologische Wissenschaften.

== Occurrence ==
The Alto Serra Branca Mine occurs where a granitic pegmatite intruded upon a biotite schist. There are many minerals found within this pegmatite. The main constituents are quartz, muscovite, microcline, and albite and amblygonite are common in smaller quantities. The minerals apatite, beryl, uraninite, and elbaite along with the tantalite group and other secondary uranium minerals are found throughout the mine. Near the center of the open portion of the mine, there are growths of two phosphates: triphylite and triplite. Serrabrancaite and other minerals (purpurite, rockbridgeite, tavorite, barbosalite, hureaulite, eosphorite, and phosphosiderite) occur as alteration products of these two phosphates. Serrabrancaite is altered triplite that is closely associated with vernadite. There were also associations with carlhintzeite, colquiriite, pachnolite, ralstonite, and fluellite.

== Physical and optical properties ==
Serrabrancaite has monoclinic crystals that range in size up to 0.3 mm. The dark brown to dark greenish-black crystals have an adamantine luster. It will streak olive green, and, on the mohs hardness scale, is a 3.5. In thin fragments, they appear translucent. It is a brittle mineral that has uneven fracture, and it does not demonstrate cleavage. Using the float-sink method with sodiumpolytungstate, it was found to have a density of 3.17(1) g/cm^{3}. The calculated value, 3.16 g/cm^{3}, is very similar to the value found using the float-sink method. Using wavelengths of 589 nm and immersion liquids, the refractive indices were measured at α = 1.75(1), β = 1.79(1) and γ < 1.79; however, γ could not be measured with great accuracy. Its pleochroism ranges from dark brown to olive greenish-brown.

== Mineral chemistry and thermal analysis ==
In order to analyze the chemical composition of serrabrancaite, both energy-dispersive X-ray spectroscopy (EDS) and wavelength-dispersive X-ray spectroscopy (WDS) were used. The EDS results showed only manganese (Mn), phosphate (P), and oxygen (O). A few crystals displayed trace quantities of iron (Fe). For the WDS analysis, a crystal free of Fe was chosen. A CAMECA SX 100 run at a voltage of 15 kV using a beam current at 10 nA collected the data. Rhodonite was used as the standard for Mn while apatite was the standard used for P. The WDS test was run at four locations on the crystal. After using the PAP corrections determined by Pouchou and Pichoir in 1988 to reduce the data, it was determined that the weight percent of serrabrancaite is roughly 46.85 percent Mn_{2}O_{3}, 42.72 percent P_{2}O_{5}, and 9.80 percent H_{2}O. These results account for 99.37 percent of the total composition of the tested crystal.

A weight loss of 14.6 percent was observed after running a thermal analysis of serrebancaite at 520 °C along with a color change from its original dark greenish-brown to a light yellowish-white. The product of the thermal analysis according to X-ray diffraction (XRD) results is Mn_{2}P_{2}O_{7}. The chemical equation for this reaction is 2 MnPO_{4}·H_{2}O → Mn_{2}P_{2}O_{7} + 2 H_{2}O + 1/2O_{2}. The empirical formula determined through microprobe and thermal analysis is Mn_{0.98}P_{1.00}O_{3.98}·0.90 H_{2}O, which is very close to the ideal composition of MnPO_{4}·H_{2}O.

== Crystal structure ==
A synthetic material was used as the standard for the X-ray diffraction (XRD) analysis. The synthetic standard had a unit cell with a = 6.912(1) Å; b = 7.470(1) Å; and c = 7.357 Å; β = 112.29(3)°, and Z = 4. The standard is in the space group C2/c. The XRD analysis was run with a Siemens D5000 diffractometer using CuKα radiation and a secondary monochromator to collect the data. The data from the analysis showed that serrabrancaite has unit cell dimensions of a = 6.914(2) Å; b = 7.468(2) Å; and c = 7.364(2) Å; β = 112.29°, and V = 351.8(1) Å^{3}. This puts serrabrancaite in the monoclinic crystal system and the point group C2/c after a structural analysis. Serrabrancaite's structure is built of chains of (MnO_{6})-octahedra that share their corners and run in the [101] direction. These chains are then held together by (PO_{4})-tetrahedra.

== Relation to other minerals ==
Serrabrancaite does not have an isostructural relationship to any natural phosphate, arsenate, or vanadate minerals. The diffraction pattern of serrabrancaite does appear to be similar to those of synthetic MnPO_{4}•H_{2}O, synthetic MnAsO_{4}·H_{2}O, and the minerals in the kieserite group (Mg, Mn, Fe, Ni, Cu, Zn)SO_{4}·H_{2}O.

== Origin ==
The Alto Serra Branca mine is characterized by two phosphates (triphylite and triplite) and their secondary minerals. Triphylite and is secondaries are iron-rich and manganese-poor, while triplite and its secondaries are manganese-rich and iron-poor. Since Serrabrancaite is an alteration of triplite, it is very low in iron. The common associate of serrabrancaite, vernadite, is also very low in iron when found in this pegmatite.

== See also ==
- List of minerals
