= Messelite =

Phosphate mineral

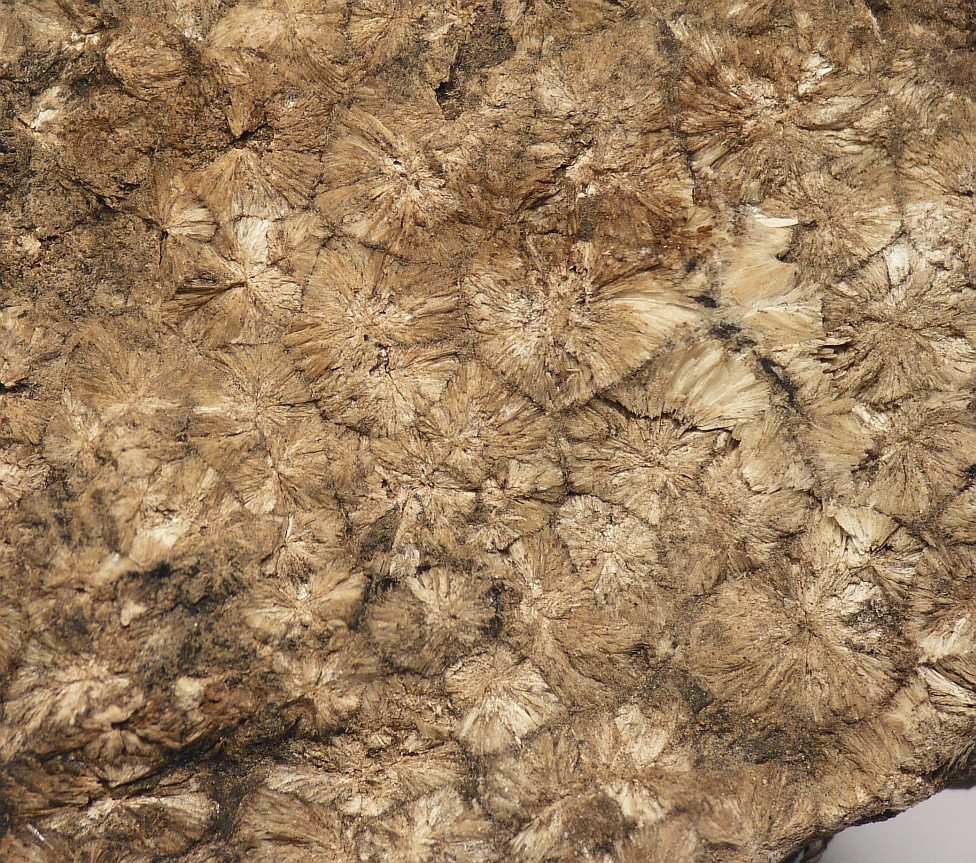
- Messelite from Germany

General
- Category: Phosphate mineral
- Formula: Ca_{2}(Fe^{2+},Mn^{2+})(PO_{4})_{2}·2H_{2}O
- IMA symbol: Msl
- Strunz classification: 8.CG.05
- Dana classification: 40.2.2.2
- Crystal system: Triclinic
- Crystal class: Pinacoidal (1̅) (same H-M symbol)
- Space group: P1̅
- Unit cell: a = 5.8 Å, b = 6.6 Å, c = 5.5 Å α = 102°, β = 109°, γ = 90°; Z = 1

Identification
- Color: White, pale greenish white, greenish gray, pink, colorless
- Cleavage: Perfect on {001}, producing curved irregular surfaces
- Fracture: Uneven
- Mohs scale hardness: 3.5
- Diaphaneity: Translucent
- Specific gravity: 3.16
- Optical properties: Biaxial (+)
- Refractive index: n_{α} = 1.644 n_{β} = 1.653 n_{γ} = 1.680
- Birefringence: δ = 0.036
- 2V angle: 20° to 35° (measured)
- Dispersion: Relatively strong

Messelite is a mineral with formula Ca_{2}(Fe^{2+},Mn^{2+})(PO_{4})_{2}·2H_{2}O. It was discovered in Germany and described in 1890. The mineral was subsequently discredited in 1940, reinstated and named neomesselite in 1955, and the name restored to messelite in 1959.

== Description ==
Messelite is a translucent mineral that is white, pale greenish white, greenish gray, pink, or colorless. The mineral may be granular or occur as internally radial aggregates of lamellar crystals arranged as globes, hemispheres, or sheafs, up to 1.5 cm (0.59 in).

Messelite is a member of the fairfieldite group.

== History ==
Messelite was discovered in Messel, Hesse, Germany, by a Dr. Spiegel who worked as technical director at a local factory. The specimen contained a number of crystals associated with carbonaceous material. It did not conform to any known mineral at the time, a fact confirmed when it was studied at a local mineralogical institute. The mineral was described by W. Muthmann in 1890 in the journal Zeitschrift für Kristallographie and its formula was identified as (Ca^{2+},Fe^{2+},Mn^{2+})_{3}(PO_{4})_{2}·2 1/2H_{2}O. At the request of Dr. Spiegel, the mineral was named messelite (German: Messelit) after the area in which it was discovered.

The first reevaluation of messelite was carried out by C. W. Wolfe in 1940. Wolfe concluded that the material was anapaite partially altered to collinsite and he discredited messelite as a valid mineral species.

Later, an unaltered mineral was found with the formula (Ca^{2+},Fe^{2+},Mn^{2+})_{3}(PO_{4})_{2}·2H_{2}O, essentially identical to the formula of messelite reported by Muthmann. It was analyzed by Clifford Frondel and found to be the disordered iron-rich analogue of fairfieldite. Frondel proposed in 1955 that the mineral be named neomesselite.

A few years later, additional material was obtained from the type locality of Messel and studied with optical and x-ray methods. The specimen was determined to consist primarily of material identical to the neomesselite described by Frondel with a rim of anapaite. Since it is likely that the mixture studied by Muthmann was primarily this mineral, it was decided around 1959 that the name neomesselite should be discarded in favor of messelite. When the IMA was founded, messelite was grandfathered as a valid mineral species.

== Occurrence ==
Messelite has been found in Austria, Brazil, Canada, Czech Republic, France, Germany, Japan, Kazakhstan, Spain, Sweden, Switzerland, Ukraine, and the United States.

The mineral tends to form in granite pegmatites by hydrothermal alteration at a late stage. Messelite occurs in association with amblygonite, anapaite, brazilianite, eosphorite, fairfieldite, goyazite, graftonite, herderite, hureaulite, ludlamite, phosphoferrite, siderite, triphylite, vivianite, and whitlockite.
