= Manganese(III) phosphate =

Names
- Other names: Manganic phosphate; Manganese monophosphate

Identifiers
CAS Number	10236-39-2
3D model (JSmol)	Interactive image
PubChem CID	14389607
CompTox Dashboard (EPA)	DTXSID70559732
- InChI: InChI=1S/Mn.H3O4P/c;1-5(2,3)4/h;(H3,1,2,3,4)/q+3;/p-3
- SMILES: [O-]P(=O)([O-])[O-].[Mn+3]

Properties
Chemical formula	MnPO_{4}
Molar mass	149.91 g/mol (anhydrous); 167.92 g/mol (monohydrate)
Appearance	Purple (anhydrous); Pale-green (monohydrate)
Density	3.4 g/cm^{3} (anhydrous); 3.16 g/cm^{3} (monohydrate)
Melting point	400 °C (752 °F; 673 K) (decomposes, anhydrous)
Solubility in water	Insoluble
Solubility	Insoluble in acetonitrile, ethanol, and acetone

Structure
Crystal structure	Orthorhombic
Space group	Pmna
Lattice constant	a = 9.65 Å, b = 5.91 Å, c = 4.78 Å
Lattice volume (V)	272 Å^{3}
- Except where otherwise noted, data are given for materials in their standard state (at 25 °C [77 °F], 100 kPa). Infobox references

Manganese(III) phosphate is an inorganic chemical compound of manganese with the formula MnPO_{4}. It is a hygroscopic purple solid that absorbs moisture to form the pale-green monohydrate, though the anhydrous and monohydrate forms are typically each synthesized by separate methods.

== Production and properties ==
Manganese phosphate monohydrate is produced by the reaction of an Mn(II) salt, such as manganese(II) sulfate, and phosphoric acid, followed by oxidation by nitric acid. Another method of producing the monohydrate is by the comproportionation of permanganate and Mn(II) in phosphoric acid:

MnO_{4}^{–} + 4 Mn^{2+} + 10 PO_{4}^{3–} + 8 H^{+} → 5 [Mn(PO_{4})_{2}]^{3–} + 4 H_{2}O

The diphosphomanganate(III) ion slowly converts to the monohydrate. Heating of the monohydrate does not yield the anhydrous form, instead, it decomposes to manganese(II) pyrophosphate (Mn_{2}P_{2}O_{7}) at 420 °C:

4 MnPO_{4}·H_{2}O → 2 Mn_{2}P_{2}O_{7} + 4 H_{2}O + O_{2}

To produce the anhydrous form, lithium manganese(II) phosphate is oxidized with nitronium tetrafluoroborate under inert conditions.

The anhydrous form is sensitive to moisture. In the absence of moisture, it decomposes at 400 °C, but when moisture is present, it slowly transitions to an amorphous phase and decomposes at 250 °C.

== Structure and natural occurrence ==
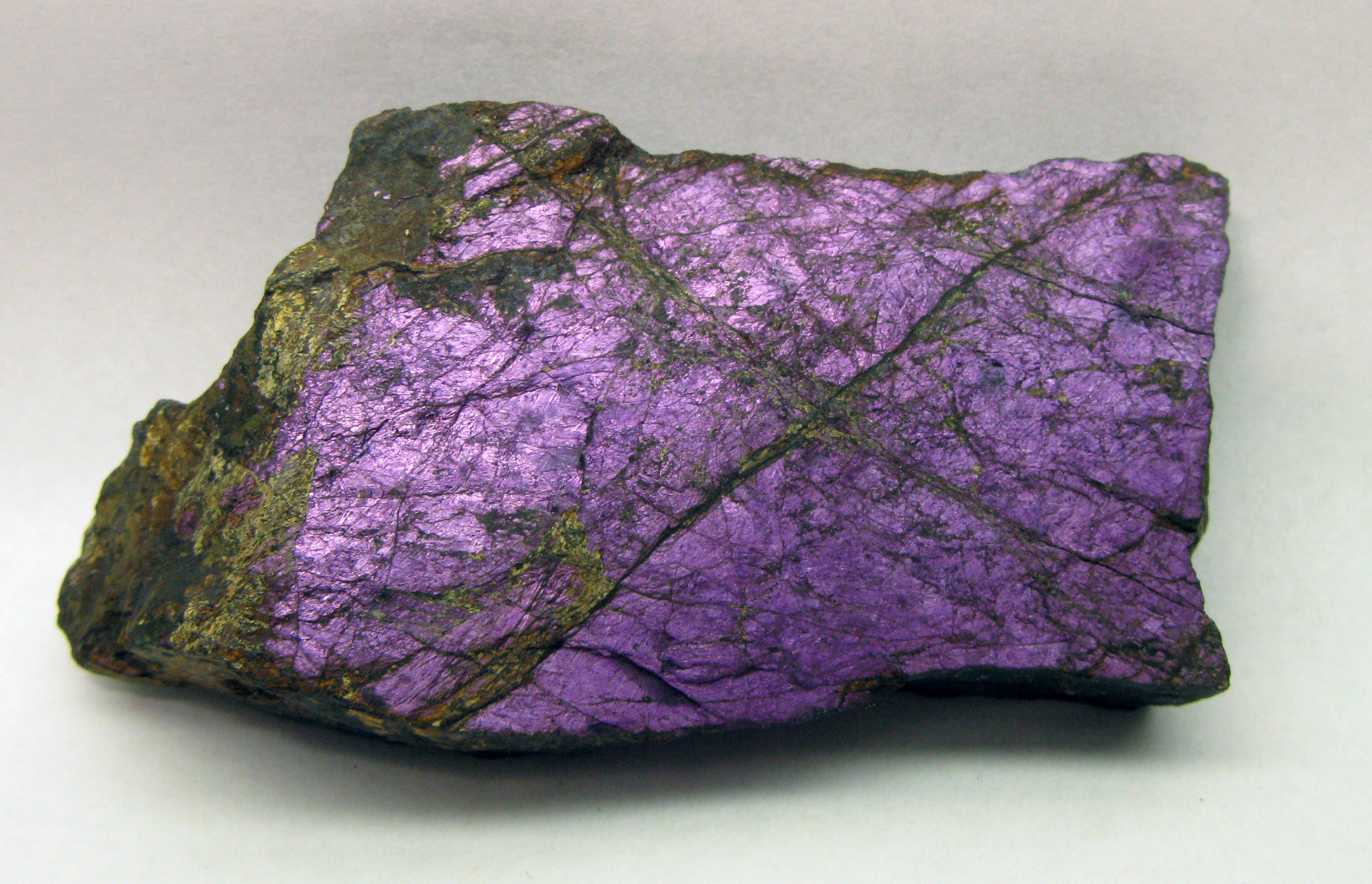
Purpurite, natural MnPO_{4}

The anhydrous form has an olivine structure and naturally occurs as the mineral purpurite. The monohydrate has a monoclinic structure, similar to that of magnesium sulfate monohydrate, but has distortions at the octahedral manganese center due to the Jahn-Teller effect. It naturally occurs as the mineral serrabrancaite.

The monohydrate form has cell parameters of a = 6.912 Å, b = 7.470 Å, β = 112.3°, and Z = 4. It consists of interconnected distorted trans-[Mn(PO_{4})_{4}(H_{2}O)_{2}] octahedra.
