= Natrophilite =

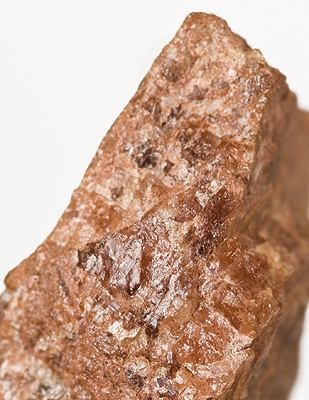
- Natrophilite, as thin coatings and fracture fillings, from Branchville, Redding, Fairfield County, Connecticut, US

General
- Category: Phosphate mineral
- Formula: NaMnPO_{4}
- IMA symbol: Ntp
- Strunz classification: 8.AB.10
- Crystal system: Orthorhombic
- Crystal class: Dipyramidal (mmm); H-M symbol: (2/m 2/m 2/m)
- Space group: Pnam

Identification
- Color: Deep yellow to light yellow
- Cleavage: Distinct/ good
- Fracture: Irregular/ uneven
- Tenacity: Brittle
- Mohs scale hardness: 4 1/2 – 5
- Luster: Sub-vitreous, greasy
- Streak: White
- Diaphaneity: Transparent, translucent
- Specific gravity: 3.41 g/cm^{3}

Natrophilite is a mineral with the chemical formula NaMnPO_{4}. In a pure form it has a yellow coloration. Its crystals are orthorhombic to dipyramidal. It is transparent to translucent. It is not radioactive. Natrophilite is rated 4.5 to 5 on the Mohs Scale. At Branchville, Fairfield County, Connecticut, it is found as a rare replacement of lithiophilite within a complex granite pegmatite, together with triploidite, eosphorite and dickinsonite.
