= Waterhouseite =

Hydroxy manganese phosphate mineral

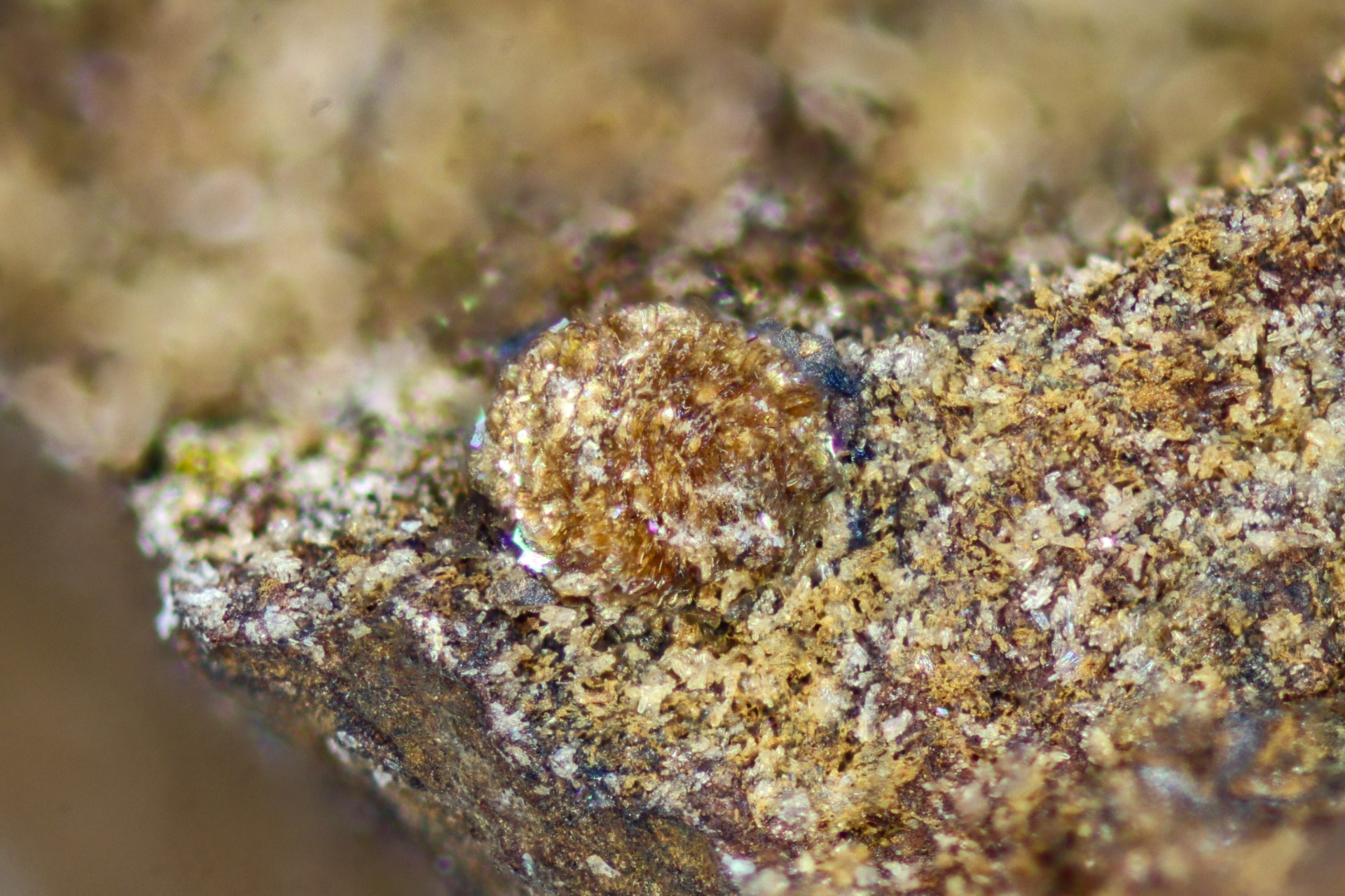

General
- Category: Phosphate mineral
- Formula: Mn_{7}(PO_{4})_{2}(OH)_{8}
- IMA symbol: Whs
- Strunz classification: 8.BE.85
- Crystal system: Monoclinic
- Crystal class: Prismatic (2/m) (same H-M symbol)
- Space group: P2_{1}/b
- Unit cell: a = 11.364 Å, b = 5.57 Å c = 10.455 Å; β = 96.61°; Z = 2

Identification
- Color: Orange-brown to dark brown
- Crystal habit: Bladed crystals
- Twinning: Contact twins on {100}
- Cleavage: Perfect on {100}, indistinct on {001}
- Fracture: Conchoidal
- Tenacity: Brittle
- Mohs scale hardness: 4
- Luster: Vitreous, Pearly on cleavages
- Streak: Yellowish Brown
- Diaphaneity: Transparent
- Specific gravity: 3.55
- Optical properties: Biaxial (-)
- Refractive index: n_{α} = 1.730 n_{β} = 1.738 n_{γ} = 1.738
- Birefringence: δ = 0.008
- Dispersion: absent

Waterhouseite, Mn_{7}(PO_{4})_{2}(OH)_{8}, is a hydroxy manganese phosphate mineral. It is a medium-soft, brittle mineral occurring in pseudo-orthorhombic monoclinic bladed crystals and orange-brown to dark brown in color. Waterhouseite is on the softer side with a Mohs hardness of 4, has a specific gravity of 3.5 and a yellowish-brown streak. It is named after Frederick George Waterhouse, first director of the South Australian Museum, as well as recognizes the work Waterhouse Club has done in support of the South Australian Museum.

== Occurrence ==
Waterhouseite occurs in divergent sprays of bladed crystals up to 1mm in length and 20 micrometers in thickness.

It is found in South Australia, specifically in the Iron Monarch mine, Iron Knob, Middleback Range, Eyre Peninsula, South Australia.

Waterhouseite is generally found in a carbonate rich cavities with other minerals such as gatehouseite, seamanite, rhodochrosite, shigaite, baryte, hausmannite and hematite.

== Crystal structure ==
Waterhouseite has a unique asymmetrical structure consisting of a dense, complex framework of Mn(O, OH)_{6} octahedra and PO_{4} tetrahedra which are linked by both edges and corners. It is highly unusual for the PO_{4} tetrahedron to share two of its edges with the Mn(O, OH)_{6} octahedral. There are only two other known arsenates that have the same edge sharing as waterhouseite.

== See also ==
- Classification of minerals
- List of minerals
