= Childrenite =

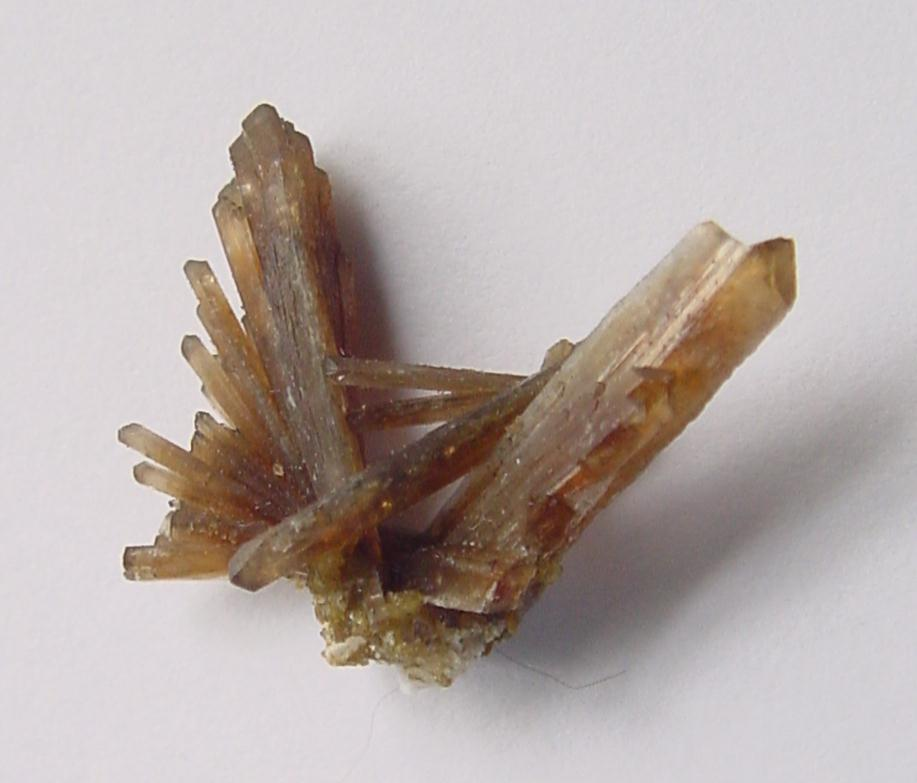

General
- Category: Phosphate minerals
- Formula: (Fe^{2+},Mn)^{2+}AlPO_{4}(OH)_{2}•H_{2}O
- IMA symbol: Chd
- Strunz classification: 8.DD.20
- Crystal system: Orthorhombic
- Crystal class: Pyramidal (mm2) (same H-M symbol)
- Space group: Bba2
- Unit cell: a = 10.41 Å, b = 13.42 Å, c = 6.92 Å; Z = 8

Identification
- Color: Yellowish brown, brown, clove-brown; colorless in transmitted light.
- Cleavage: Poor/indistinct on {100}
- Fracture: Irregular/uneven, sub-conchoidal
- Mohs scale hardness: 5
- Luster: Vitreous, resinous
- Streak: White
- Diaphaneity: Transparent, translucent
- Specific gravity: 3.11–3.19
- Optical properties: Biaxial (−)
- Refractive index: n_{α} = 1.644 – 1.649 n_{β} = 1.662 – 16.830 n_{γ} = 1.671 – 1.691
- Birefringence: δ = 0.027 – 0.042
- Pleochroism: Visible
- 2V angle: Measured: 40° to 45°, calculated: 50°
- Dispersion: r > v strong
- Solubility: Soluble in acids.

Childrenite is a rare hydrated phosphate mineral with elements iron, manganese, aluminium, phosphorus, oxygen and hydrogen. Its chemical formula is (Fe^{2+},Mn)^{2+}AlPO_{4}(OH)_{2}•H_{2}O and it has a molecular weight of 229.83 g/mol. Its specific gravity is 3.2 and it has a Mohs hardness of 4.5 to 5. It is usually translucent and non-fluorescent, with imperfect cleavage. It has a vitreous lustre with a white streak, and is brown or yellow in color. It has a conchoidal, uneven fracture, and an orthorhombic crystal system.

== History and formation ==
Childrenite was discovered in 1823 by John George Children (1777–1852), who was a prominent English chemist and mineralogist. This secondary mineral was first found in the George and Charlotte Mine near Tavistock in Devon. Its formation is probably from the alteration of granitic phosphates like lithiophilite and triphylite. Childrenite is also found in some ore veins.

== Relationship to other species ==
Childrenite forms a solid solution series with eosphorite. The chemical composition of eosphorite only differs by being rich in manganese and not in iron. The structures are the same, and differences in properties can be traced to the iron/manganese percentage. Of the two, childrenite is denser. Furthermore, eosphorite is normally pink in color, which can be attributed to manganese.
