= Phosphosiderite =

Phosphate mineral

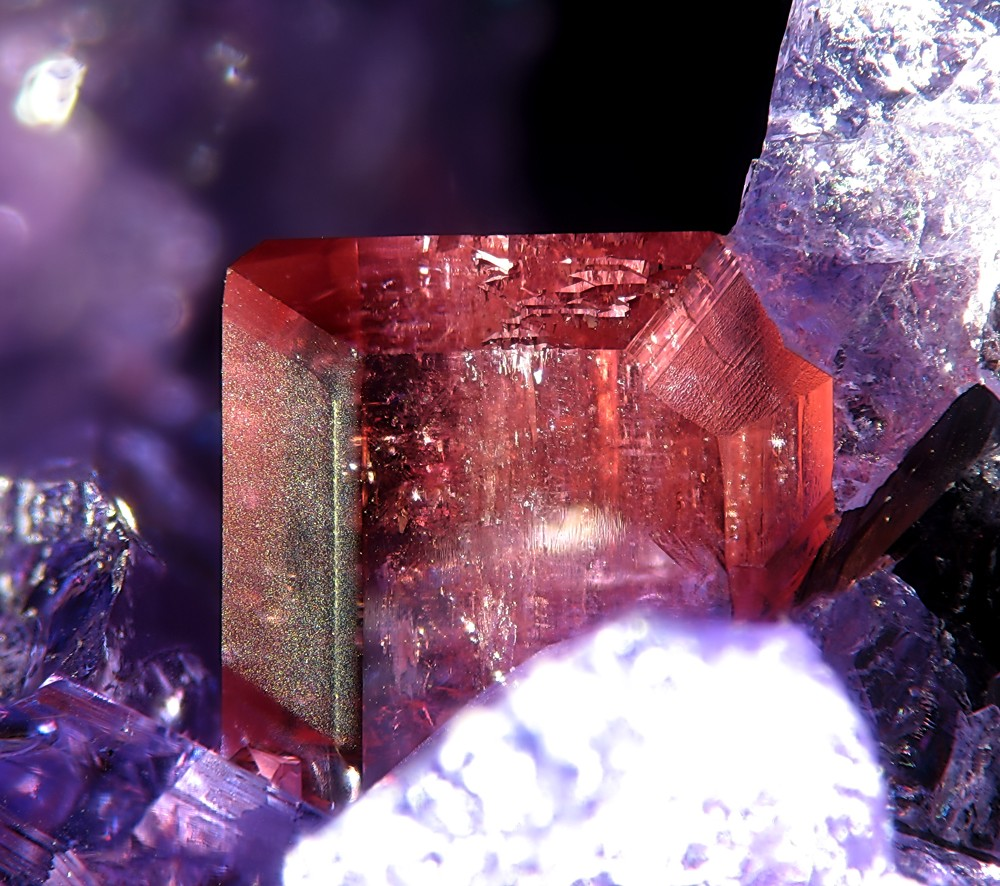
- Red phosphosiderite between violet strengite. Picture width 4 mm.

General
- Category: Phosphate minerals
- Formula: Hydrated iron phosphate FePO_{4}·2H_{2}O
- IMA symbol: Phsd
- Crystal system: Monoclinic
- Crystal class: Prismatic 2/m
- Space group: P2_{1}/n (no. 14)
- Unit cell: 454.76 Å³

Identification
- Formula mass: 186.85
- Color: Usually red to pink to purple, sometimes green, usually yellow veined
- Crystal habit: Tabular {010} or stout prismatic [001]
- Twinning: Common on {101}, typically as interpenetration
- Cleavage: {010} Distinct, {001} Indistinct
- Fracture: Uneven
- Mohs scale hardness: 3.5–4
- Luster: Vitreous
- Streak: White
- Diaphaneity: Transparent, translucent
- Specific gravity: 2.74–2.76
- Density: 2.74 – 2.76 measured, 2.76 calculated
- Optical properties: Biaxial (−)
- Refractive index: n_{α} = 1.692 n_{β} = 1.725 n_{γ} = 1.738
- Birefringence: 0.046
- Pleochroism: Visible
- 2V angle: Measured: 62°, Calculated: 62°
- Dispersion: Very strong r > v
- Solubility: Totally soluble in hydrochloric acid, nearly insoluble in nitric acid

Phosphosiderite is a rare mineral named for its main components, phosphate and iron. The siderite at the end of phosphosiderite comes from the word "sideros", the Greek word for iron. It was published in 1890, and has been a valid species since pre-IMA. It is an IMA approved mineral which got grandfathered, meaning its name is still believed to refer to an existing species.

== Properties ==
Phosphosiderite is a member of the metavariscite group, and probably forms a complete series with metavariscite. It is the dimorph of strengite. It is totally soluble in Hydrochloric acid and nearly insoluble in nitric acid. It is usually cut into a cabochon shape for jewelry, and used as an ornamental stone. It mainly consists of oxygen (51.38%), iron (29.89%) and phosphorus (16.58%), but contains hydrogen (2.16%) as well.

== Colors ==
Phosphosiderite is often found in a bright orchid-purple tint with yellow-colored streaks. The vein-like streaks found in the stone are known as cacoxenite. Four other rare color variants are rose red, brown-reddish yellow, mossy green, and dark shades of purple. Phosphosiderite can also be found as a colorless mineral. It is pleochroic; on the X axis around 4° it is light rose, on the Y axis it is carmine red, and on Z it is colorless.

== Occurrences and localities ==
Phosphosiderite is mined in some parts of Chile, Argentina, Germany, Portugal, and the United States. It occurs in association with strengite, turquoise, triphylite, leucophosphite, huréaulite, barbosalite and laueite. In zoned granitic pegmatites, it usually occurs as an alteration product of primary phosphates. This makes it a secondary phosphate. It may be replacing shells and bones, and can occur in the soil as a component of it as well. However, the latter is rarer.
