= Arsenoclasite =

Mineral

General
- Category: Arsenate mineral
- Formula: Mn_{5}(AsO_{4})_{2}(OH)_{4}
- IMA symbol: Asc
- Strunz classification: 8.BD.10
- Dana classification: 41.4.1.1
- Crystal system: Orthorhombic
- Crystal class: Disphenoidal (222); H-M symbol: (222)
- Space group: P2_{1}2_{1}2_{1}
- Unit cell: a = 9.31, b = 5.75 c = 18.29 [Å]; Z = 4

Identification
- Formula mass: 620.56 g/mol
- Color: Red, dark orange-brown
- Crystal habit: Massive or granular
- Cleavage: Perfect on {010}
- Mohs scale hardness: 5–6
- Diaphaneity: Translucent
- Density: 4.16 g/cm^{3} (measured)
- Optical properties: Biaxial (−)
- Refractive index: n_{α} = 1.787, n_{β} = 1.810, n_{γ} = 1.816
- Birefringence: δ = 0.029
- 2V angle: 53°
- Dispersion: Extreme

Arsenoclasite (originally arsenoklasite) is a red or dark orange brown mineral with formula Mn_{5}(AsO_{4})_{2}(OH)_{4}. The name comes from the Greek words αρσενικόν (for arsenic) and κλάσις (for cleavage), as arsenoclasite contains arsenic and has perfect cleavage. The mineral was discovered in 1931 in Långban, Sweden.

== Description ==
Arsenoclasite is red or dark orange brown in color. The mineral rarely occurs as crystals; rather it has either a massive or granular habit. When crystals are present, they are no larger than 5 millimetres (0.20 in). Arsenoclasite has been found in association with adelite, allactite, barite, calcite, dolomite, gatehouseite, hausmannite, hematite, manganoan ferroan calcite, sarkinite, and shigaite. The mineral occurs in fissures of metamorphosed Fe-Mn ore bodies and sedimentary Fe-Mn deposits.

== Structure ==
A 1971 study identified the mineral's structure as an array of oxygen atoms in a double hexagonal close packed pattern. However, a 1977 study discovered that all the manganese ions in arsenoclasite are six-coordinated, a constraint this structure cannot permit without severe distortion. The 1977 study identified arsenoclasite as isostructural to Co_{5}(PO_{4})_{2}(OH)_{4} and Mn_{5}(PO_{4})_{2}(OH)_{4}.

== History ==
Arsenoclasite was noted from specimens at Långban, Värmland, Sweden, by Gust Flink in 1924 as a mineral that appeared similar to sarkinite, but with one perfect cleavage. Arsenoclasite was discovered in Långban and officially identified by G. Aminoff in 1931 under the name arsenoklasite. The samples observed by Aminoff did not occur as crystals.

== Distribution ==
As of 2012, arsenoclasite is known from Långban, Sweden, the Valgraveglia Mine in Liguria, Italy, and the Iron Monarch open cut in South Australia. The type material is held at the Swedish Museum of Natural History in Stockholm and the Natural History Museum, London.
