= Rockbridgeite =

Phosphate mineral

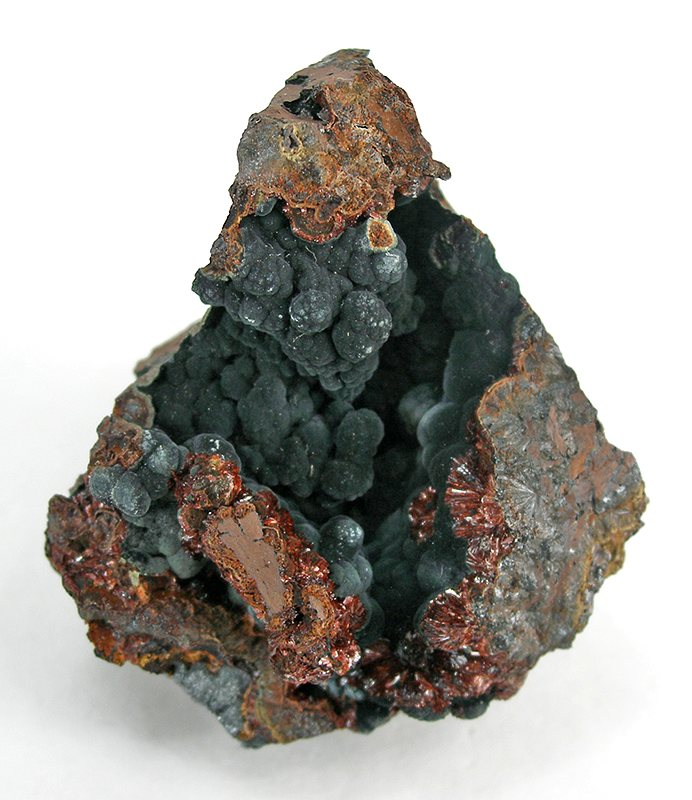

General
- Category: Minerals
- Formula: Fe^{2+}Fe^{3+}_{4}(PO_{4})_{3}(OH)_{5}
- IMA symbol: Rkb
- Strunz classification: 8.BC.10
- Dana classification: 41.9.2.1
- Crystal system: Orthorhombic
- Crystal class: Dipyramidal (2/m2/m2/m) (same H-M symbol)
- Space group: Bbmm

Identification
- Formula mass: 648.96 g/mol
- Color: Varies from green, to black, to brownish green, to reddish brown
- Crystal habit: Euhedral crystals rare; typically fibrous in crusts, botryoidal and drusy masses
- Twinning: Cruciform twins possible
- Cleavage: Perfect on {100}, Distinct on {010}, Distinct on {001}
- Fracture: Uneven
- Tenacity: Brittle
- Mohs scale hardness: 4.5
- Luster: Vitreous to dull
- Streak: Greenish gray
- Diaphaneity: Subtranslucent
- Specific gravity: 3.40
- Optical properties: Biaxial (+)
- Refractive index: N_{x} = 1.875, N_{y} = 1.880, N_{z} = 1.897
- Birefringence: 0.0220
- Pleochroism: (x): light brown to light yellow-brown (y): bluish green. (z): dark bluish green.
- Solubility: Soluble in HCl, but not in HNO_{3} or H_{2}SO_{4}

Rockbridgeite is an anhydrous phosphate mineral in the "Rockbridgeite" supergroup with the chemical formula Fe^{2+}Fe^{3+}_{4}(PO_{4})_{3}(OH)_{5}. It was discovered at the since-shut-down Midvale Mine in Rockbridge County, Virginia, United States. The researcher who first identified it, Clifford Frondel, named it in 1949 for its region of discovery, Rockbridge County.

== Structure ==
The stable form of rockbridgeite is orthorhombic 2/m2/m2/m, space group Bbmm. Face-sharing trimers in the structure share octahedron corners, forming chains of octahedra extending in the direction of the b-axis. Adjacent chains formed from two trimers and (PO_{4}) groups extending along the direction of the a-axis, resulting in sheets parallel to (001). Each chain of octahedra is connected by a layer of tetrahedra extending along the direction of the a-axis.

== Unit cell ==
The unit cell parameters are a = 14 Å, b = 17 Å, and c = 5.2 Å, with 4 formula units per unit cell (Z = 4).
More accurate values are given by various sources as follows.

- a = 13.783 Å, b = 16.805 Å, c = 5.172 Å, β = 100.313(1)°

== Optical properties ==
Rockbridgeite varies from green, to black, to brownish green, to reddish brown. It is subtranslucent, with a greenish gray streak and vitreous to dull luster. The refractive indices are N_{x} = 1.875, N_{y} = 1.880, N_{z} = 1.897.

== Physical properties ==
Rockbridgeite shows perfect cleavage on {100}, distinct cleavage on {010}, and distinct cleavage on {001}. Rockbridgeite is a brittle mineral, with an uneven fracture, hardness 4.5 and specific gravity 3.40. It is soluble in hydrochloric acid HCl, but not in nitric acid HNO_{3} or sulfuric acid H_{2}SO_{4}.

== Environment ==
Rockbridgeite primarily forms in igneous rocks when the primary iron and manganese phosphates in granite pegmatites undergo mineral alteration through redox reactions, resulting in these phosphates becoming oxidized and causing rockbridgeite to form. More rarely, rockbridgeite can also form in sedimentary rocks in association with limonite from iron ore deposits. Associated minerals include triphylite, hureaulite, barbosalite, roscherite, and limonite.

== Localities ==
The type locality is the since-shut-down Midvale Mine in Rockbridge County, Virginia, United States. Other localities for rockbridgeite include sites in Brazil, Portugal, Bavaria, Saxony, South Australia, Namibia, Zimbabwe, and Morocco. Type material is conserved for reference in Harvard University in Cambridge, Massachusetts, United States.
