= Kovdorskite =

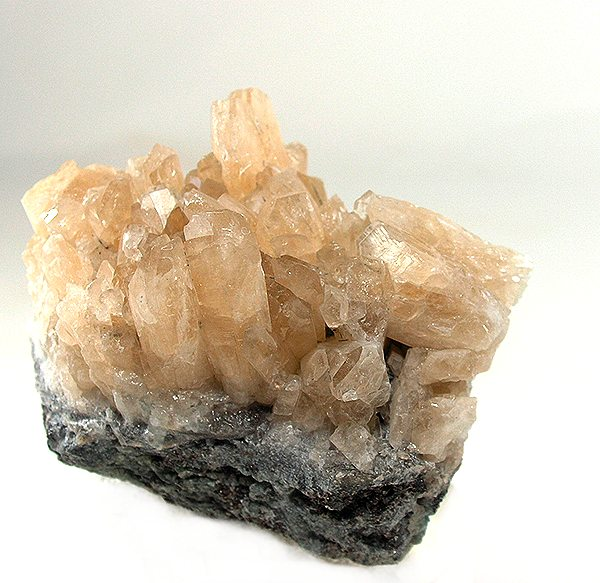

General
- Category: Phosphate minerals
- Formula: Mg_{2}PO_{4}(OH)·3H_{2}O
- IMA symbol: Kov
- Strunz classification: 8.DC.22
- Dana classification: 43.05.08.01
- Crystal system: Monoclinic
- Crystal class: Prismatic (2/m) (same H-M symbol)
- Space group: P2_{1}/n
- Unit cell: a = 10.35, b = 12.90 c = 4.73 [Å]; Z = 4

Identification
- Color: Translucent white to pale blue to bright pink
- Crystal habit: Rough prismatic
- Fracture: Conchoidal to uneven
- Mohs scale hardness: 4
- Luster: Vitreous
- Specific gravity: 2.28 (measured), 2.30 (calculated)
- Optical properties: Biaxial (-)
- Refractive index: n_{α} = 1.527 n_{β} = 1.542 n_{γ} = 1.549
- Birefringence: δ = 0.022
- 2V angle: 80°-82° (measured)
- Dispersion: r > v, very weak

Kovdorskite, Mg_{2}PO_{4}(OH)·3H_{2}O, is a rare, hydrated, magnesium phosphate mineral. It was first described by Kapustin et al., and is found only in the Kovdor Massif near Kovdor, Kola Peninsula, Russia. It is associated with collinsite, magnesite, dolomite, hydrotalcite, apatite, magnetite, and forsterite.
