= Eveite =

Manganese arsenate mineral

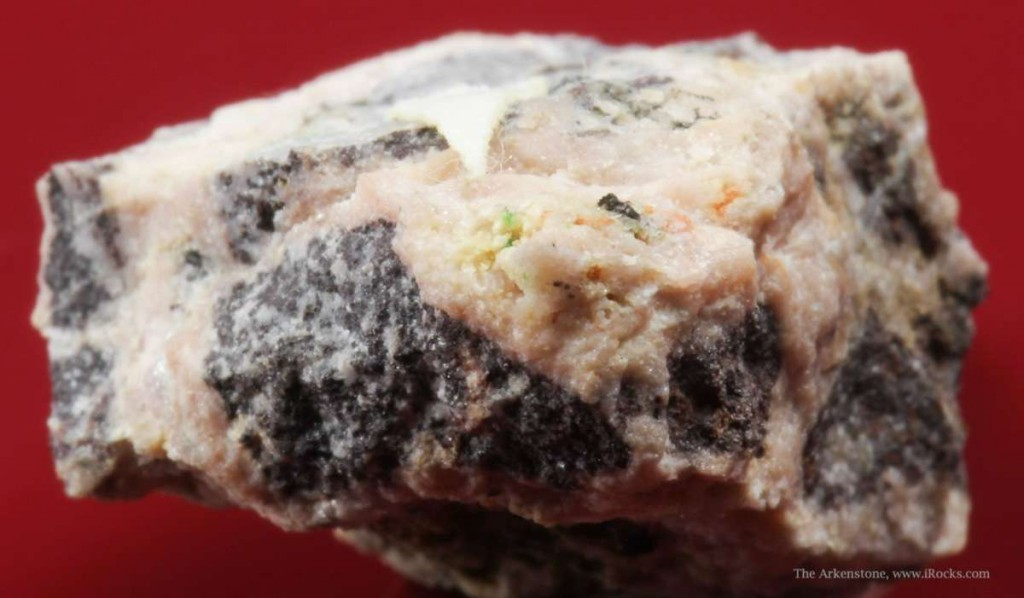
- Eveite found in Sweden

General
- Category: Arsenate minerals
- Formula: Mn_{2}^{2+}AsO_{4}OH
- IMA symbol: Ev
- Strunz classification: 8.BB.30
- Crystal system: Orthorhombic
- Crystal class: Dipyramidal (mmm); H-M symbol: (2/m 2/m 2/m)
- Space group: Pnnm
- Unit cell: a = 8.57(1), b = 8.77(1) c = 6.27(1) [Å]; Z = 4

Identification
- Formula mass: 265.80 g/mol
- Color: Apple green, pale yellow
- Crystal habit: Tabular or sheaf-like
- Cleavage: Fair on {101}
- Mohs scale hardness: 3 1/2 - 4
- Luster: Vitreous
- Streak: White
- Diaphaneity: Semitransparent
- Specific gravity: 3.76
- Optical properties: Biaxial
- Refractive index: n_{α} = 1.700(5), n_{β} = 1.715(5), n_{γ} = 1.732(10)
- Birefringence: β = .032
- Pleochroism: Visible: X = Z = green Y = Yellow
- 2V angle: Measured: 65°
- Solubility: completely soluble in cold 1:1 HCl

Eveite is a manganese arsenate mineral in the olivenite group. Its chemical formula is Mn_{2}AsO_{4}OH. It is found only in Långban, Filipstad, Värmland, Sweden and at the Sterling Mine in New Jersey, United States. It is a dimorph of sarkinite and is isostructural with adamite. The name, for the biblical "Eve", comes from its structural similarities to adamite and is also a reference to its apple-green color. It can also be pale yellow. Eveite is an orthorhombic mineral, which means it has three crystallographic axes of unequal lengths which are at 90° to one another.

Eveite is anisotropic, which means that its physical and optical properties differ with respect to direction. It has high relief, which is the apparent topography exhibited by minerals in thin section as a consequence of refractive index. It is biaxial, so it has two optic axes and three indices of refraction n depending on the crystallographic direction. The refractive index is the ratio of the velocity of light in vacuum to that in the mineral. The difference between the highest and lowest indices of refraction is called the birefringence, so the birefringence of eveite is β = 0.032.

Eveite is significant because it was the first mineral to show Mn^{2+} atoms in five-fold coordination, which is otherwise undocumented in mineral structures. It is therefore an important addition to the olivenite group. Because it shows up in very small quantities and in only two locations, it has no commercial use. It is relatively low-density and is associated with high-hydrate and low-density arsenates in open cavities, which contributes to its rarity.

== Sources ==
- Pabst, A. (1970) New Mineral Names. American Mineralogist, 55, 319-320.
- Moore, P. and Smyth, J. (1968) Crystal Chemistry of the Basic Manganese Arsenates: III. The Crystal Structure of Eveite. American Mineralogist, 53, 1841-1845.
- Moore, P. (1968) Eveite, Mn_{2}^{2+}AsO_{4}OH, a new mineral from Långban. Arkiv För Mineralogi Och Geologi, 4.26, 473-476.
