= Collinsite =

Phosphate mineral

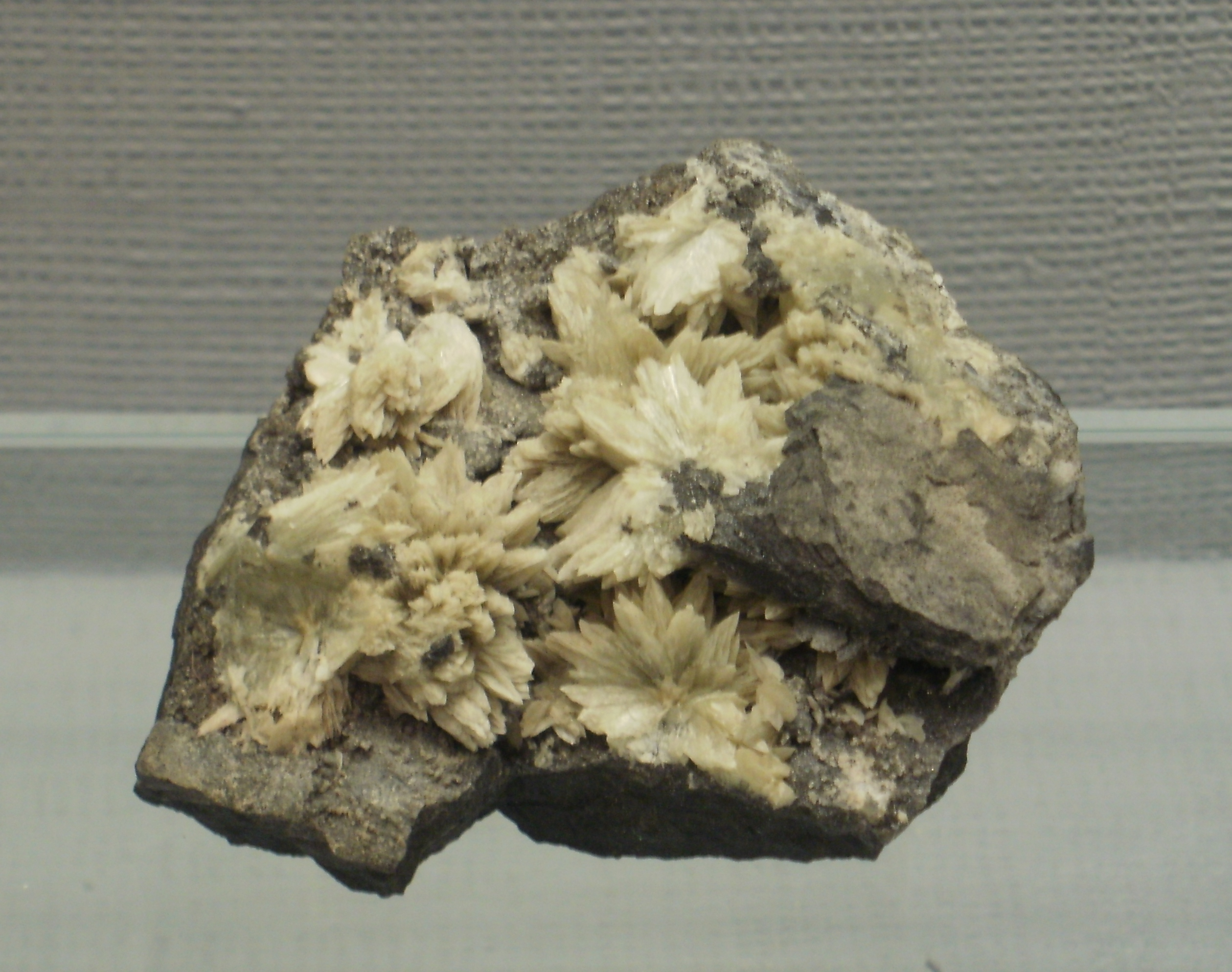
- Crystals of collinsite from the Rapid Creek area of northern Yukon, Canada

General
- Category: Phosphate mineral
- Formula: Ca_{2}(Mg,Fe^{2+})(PO_{4})_{2}•2H_{2}O
- IMA symbol: Coll
- Strunz classification: 8.CG.05
- Dana classification: 40.2.2.3
- Crystal system: Triclinic
- Crystal class: Pinacoidal (1̅) (same H-M symbol)
- Space group: P1̅
- Unit cell: a = 5.734(1) Å b = 6.780(1) Å c = 5.441(1) Å α = 97.29°, β = 108.56°, γ = 107.28°; Z = 1

Identification
- Cleavage: Fair on {001} and {010}
- Tenacity: Brittle
- Mohs scale hardness: 3 to 3.5
- Luster: Subvitreous, silky if fibrous
- Streak: White
- Diaphaneity: Translucent
- Specific gravity: 2.99
- Optical properties: Biaxial (+)
- Refractive index: n_{α} = 1.632 n_{β} = 1.642 n_{γ} = 1.657
- Birefringence: δ = 0.025
- 2V angle: 80° (measured)
- Dispersion: r < v strong
- Ultraviolet fluorescence: Non-fluorescent
- Solubility: Readily soluble in acids

Collinsite is a mineral with chemical formula Ca_{2}(Mg,Fe^{2+})(PO_{4})_{2}•2H_{2}O. It was discovered in British Columbia, Canada, and formally described in 1927. It was named in honor of William Henry Collins (1878–1937), director of the Geological Survey of Canada. There are three varieties of the mineral: magnesian collinsite, zincian collinsite, and strontian collinsite. The crystal structure consists of polyhedral chains linked by weak hydrogen bonds.

== Description ==
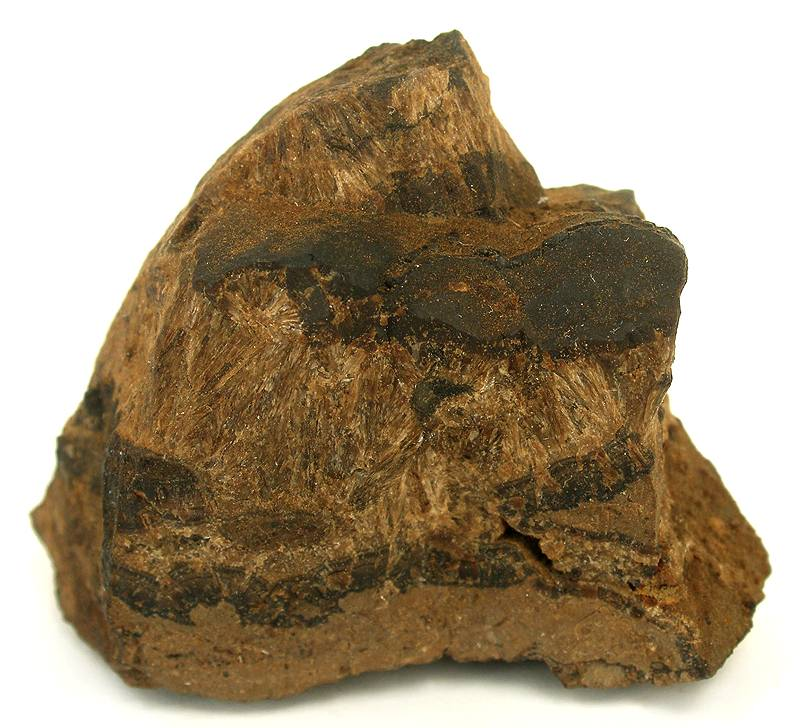
Brown-colored collinsite from François Lake

Collinsite is translucent and brown, chocolate-black, light brown, yellowish white, white, or colorless. It is colorless in thin section and light yellow-brown to colorless in transmitted light. The zincian variety of collinsite is pale blue. The mineral can occur with fibrous habit, as globular aggregates of crystals, as concentrically layered botryoidal masses, or as bladed or prismatic crystals up to 2 cm (0.79 in).

Collinsite is a member of the fairfieldite group. Hillite is the zinc analogue of collinsite and collinsite is the magnesium analogue of messelite.

=== Varieties ===
There are three varieties of collinsite:

- magnesian collinsite, Ca_{2}Mg(PO_{4})_{2}·2H_{2}O
- zincian collinsite, Ca_{2}(Mg,Zn^{2+})(PO_{4})_{2}·2H_{2}O
- strontian collinsite, (Ca,Sr}_{2}(Mg,Fe^{2+})(PO_{4})_{2}·2H_{2}O

Magnesian collinsite was described from South Dakota in 1972, zincian collinsite was described from South Australia in 1973, and strontian collinsite was described from Russia as early as 1965. The replacement of calcium by strontium that occurs in strontian collinsite is atypical of collinsite.

== Structure ==
The crystal structure of collinsite was determined using essentially pure magnesian collinsite, Ca_{2}Mg(PO_{4})_{2}·2H_{2}O, and published in 1974. It consists of chains of corner-sharing (MgΦ_{6}) octahedra and (PO_{4}) tetrahedra. Four of the Mg ligands link to (PO_{4}) groups and the other two to water molecules. Two of the ligands in the (PO_{4}) group link to (MgΦ_{6}) octahedra and the other two link to calcium atoms and act as hydrogen bond acceptors. Weak hydrogen bonds link chains together and force separation between them. The separation gives room for interstitial, eight-coordinated calcium between chains.

== History ==
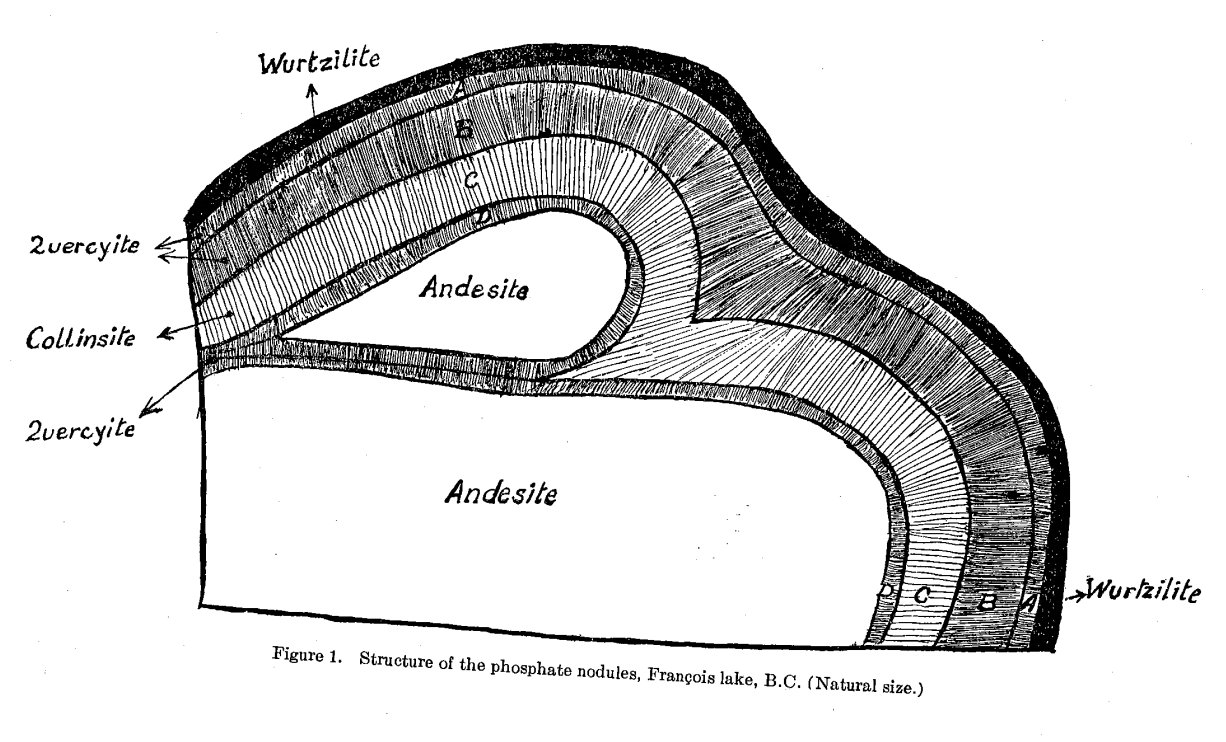
Diagram of the phosphorite nodules from François Lake; collinsite is the lightly colored layer

Collinsite was discovered prior to 1927 near François Lake, British Columbia. In a 4-to-12-inch-wide vein (10 to 30 cm), phosphorite nodules were discovered that consisted of a fragment of andesite enclosed by concentric layers of phosphate minerals coated in wurtzilite. The phosphate layers were composed of a mineral named quercyite (since determined to be improperly classified) and the new mineral collinsite. The François Lake collinsite was light-brown and consisted of sub-centimeter blades.

Collinsite was named in honor of William Henry Collins (1878–1937) who, at the time, was director of the Geological Survey of Canada. The mineral was described by Eugene Poitevin in 1927 in a publication of the Geological Survey. With the analysis performed by E. A. Thompson, Poitevin identified the formula as Ca_{2}(Mg,Fe^{2+})(PO_{4})_{2}•2½H_{2}O. Since no crystals of collinsite were found, the only crystallographic information determined was the angle between cleavages.

In 1940, C. W. Wolfe reexamined the mineral species. With analysis performed by F. A. Gonyer, Wolfe identified the formula of collinsite was Ca_{2}(Mg,Fe^{2+})(PO_{4})_{2}•2H_{2}O, containing less water than Poitevin indicated. Wolfe also questioned the four cleavages found by Poitevin, since he could identify only two fair cleavages from six fibrous crystals.

When the IMA was founded, messelite was grandfathered as a valid mineral species.

== Occurrence ==
Collinsite has been found in Australia, Austria, Bahamas, Brazil, Canada, Germany, Namibia, Norway, Romania, Russia, South Africa, Spain, and the United States. The mineral formed as an incrustation of other minerals by weathering. It occurs in association with bitumen, bobierrite, carbonate rich fluoroapatite, cryptomelane, dolomite, Fe–Mn oxides, kovdorskite, parahopeite, and scholzite.
