= Sarkinite =

Mineral

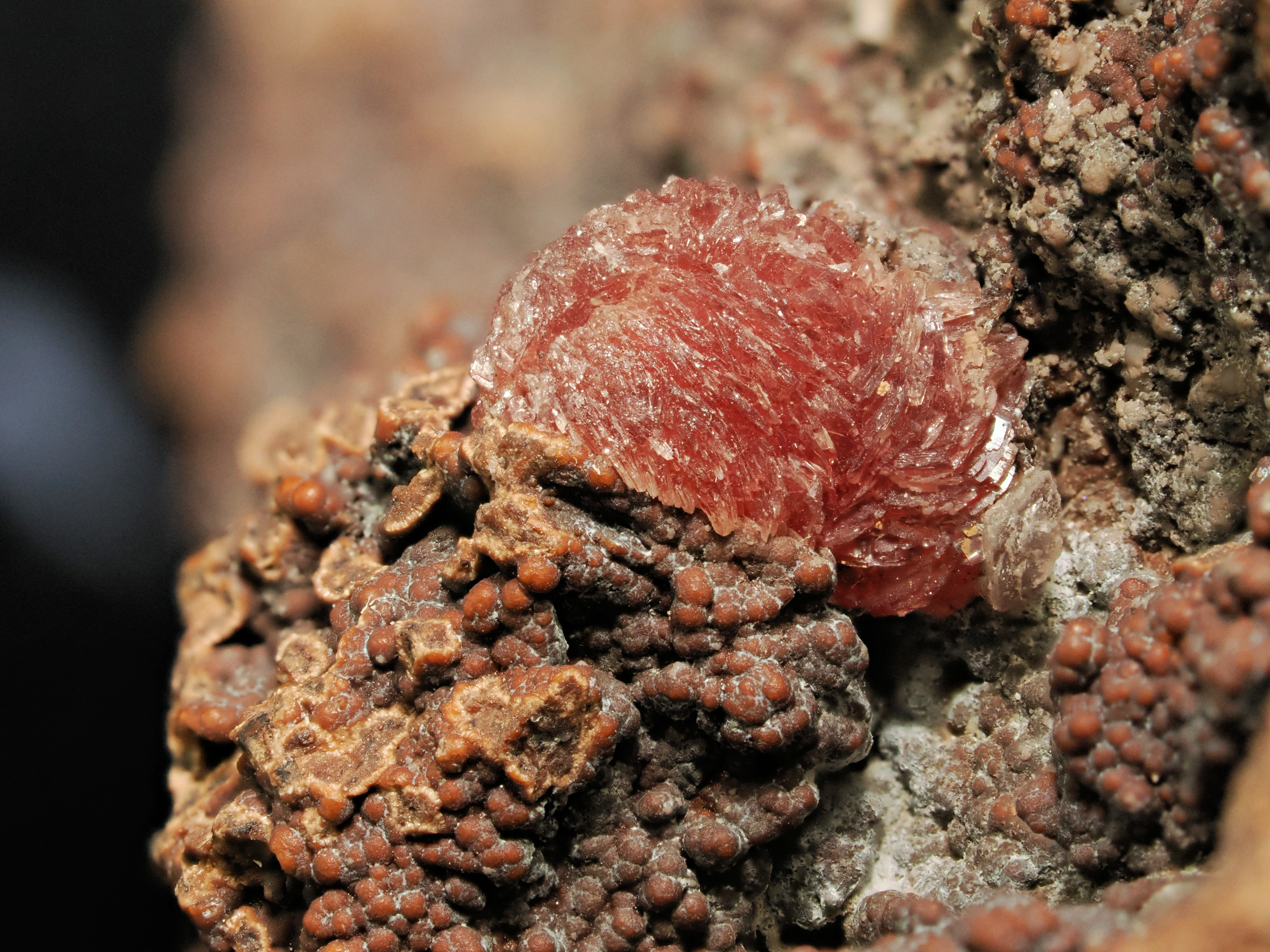

General
- Category: Arsenate minerals
- Formula: Mn_{2}(AsO_{4})(OH)
- IMA symbol: Srk
- Strunz classification: 8.BB.15
- Dana classification: 41.6.3.3
- Crystal system: Monoclinic
- Crystal class: Prismatic (2/m) (same H-M symbol)
- Space group: P2m
- Unit cell: a = 12.7795(13) Å b = 13.6127(14) Å c = 10.2188(11) Å β = 108.834(2)°; Z = 16

Identification
- Color: Red to yellow
- Crystal habit: Tabular or granular
- Cleavage: Distinct on {100}
- Fracture: Irregular/Uneven, Conchoidal
- Mohs scale hardness: 4–5
- Luster: Greasy
- Streak: Red to yellow
- Diaphaneity: Semitransparent
- Density: 4.08 to 4.18 g/cm^{3} (measured)
- Optical properties: Biaxial (−)
- Refractive index: n_{α}=1.793, n_{β}=1.807, n_{γ}=1.809
- Birefringence: δ = 0.016
- Pleochroism: Weak
- 2V angle: 83° (measured)
- Dispersion: r > v or r < v
- Absorption spectra: X > Z > Y
- Solubility: Readily soluble in dilute acids

Sarkinite, synonymous with chondrarsenite and polyarsenite, is a mineral with formula Mn_{2}(AsO_{4})(OH). The mineral is named for the Greek word σάρκιυος, meaning made of flesh, for its red color and greasy luster. The mineral was first noted in Sweden in 1865 as chondrarsenite, though not identified as sarkinite until 1885.

== Description ==
Sarkinite is red to yellow in color. It occurs as thick tabular crystals, short prismatic crystals, or has a granular habit. Sarkinite sometimes aggregates into a roughly spherical shape. Sarkinite is a member of the Wagnerite Group.

The mineral occurs in manganese-rich lenses in quartzitic chlorite schists, metamorphosed zinc ore bodies, and rarely in metamorphosed Fe–Mn ore bodies.

== Structure ==
Sarkinite is isostructural with triploidite and wolfeite and is a dimorph of eveite. The crystal structure consists of MnO_{4}(OH)_{2} octahedra, MnO_{4}(OH) trigonal bipyramids, and AsO_{4} tetrahedra.

== History ==
In 1885, two similar minerals were discovered in Sweden. Polyarsenite was found in Grythyttan and named by Igelström for its high arsenic content. Sarkinite was discovered in Pajsberg, Persberg, and named by A. Sjögren after the Greek word σάρκιυος, meaning made of flesh, in reference to the blood-red color and greasy luster. It was considered likely that the two minerals were identical. A study in 1980 showed that polyarsenite and chondrarsenite, discovered in 1865, were in fact both sarkinite.

== Distribution ==
As of 2012, sarkinite has been found in Austria, France, Italy, Japan, Kazakhstan, Romania, Sweden, Switzerland, and the United States.

== Association ==
Sarkinite has been found in association with:

Harstigen mine, Sweden

- Barite, bementite, brandtite, calcite, lead

Sjö mine, Sweden

- Jacobsite, katoptrite, magnetite, tephroite

Ködnitz Valley, Austria

- Pyroxmangite, rhodochrosite, rhodonite, spessartine, tephroite, tiragalloite

Falotta mine, Switzerland

- Brandtite, braunite, grischunite, manganoan berzeliite, rhodochrosite, tilasite

Sterling Hill, New Jersey, US

- Adamite, allactite, barite, brandtite, copper, euchroite, eveite, kraisslite, manganese oxides, parabrandtite, rhodochrosite, serpierite, willemite
