= Falsterite =

Rare phosphate mineral

General
- Category: Phosphate mineral
- Formula: Ca_{2}MgMn^{2+}_{2}(Fe^{2+}_{0.5}Fe^{3+}_{0.5})_{4} Zn_{4}(PO_{4})_{8}(OH)_{4}(H_{2}O)_{14}
- IMA symbol: Fls
- Crystal system: Monoclinic
- Crystal class: Prismatic (2/m) (same H-M symbol)
- Space group: P2_{1}/c
- Unit cell: a = 6.39, b = 21.26 c = 15.37 [Å]; β = 90.56° (approximated); Z = 2

Identification
- Color: Greenish-blue
- Crystal habit: thin plates, rectangular laths
- Cleavage: {010}, perfect
- Fracture: Uneven
- Luster: Vitreous
- Streak: Very pale greenish-blue
- Diaphaneity: Transparent
- Density: 2.78 (measured); 2.84 (calculated; approximated)
- Optical properties: Biaxal (-)
- Refractive index: nα=1.58, nβ=1.60, nγ=1.61 (approximated)
- Pleochroism: Colorless to very pale yellow (X & Z), blue-green (Y)
- Dispersion: Strong

Falsterite is a rare phosphate mineral with the formula Ca_{2}MgMn^{2+}_{2}(Fe^{2+}_{0.5}Fe^{3+}_{0.5})_{4}Zn_{4}(PO_{4})_{8}(OH)_{4}(H_{2}O)_{14}. It is a pegmatitic mineral, related to the currently approved mineral ferraioloite.

== Occurrence and association ==
Falsterite was found in Palermo No. 1 pegmatite, North Groton, Grafton County, New Hampshire, US. Co-type locality is pegmatite at Estes quarry, Baldwin, Cumberland County, Maine, US. Falsterite is a product of alteration of triphylite and sphalerite.

== Crystal structure ==
Main features of the crystal structure of falsterite, which is somewhat similar to that of schoonerite, are:

- chains of Fe^{n+}O_{6} octahedra, displaying edge-sharing
- chains of ZnO_{4} tetrahedra, that display corner-sharing
- sheets, parallel to {010}, formed by linking the above two types of chains by PO_{4} tetrahedra
- slabs formed by linking the sheets with MnO_{6} octahedra and CaO_{7} polyhedra

The slabs are bridged by dimers of MgO_{6} octahedra that display edge-sharing. Magnesium-bearing octahedra share edges with zinc-bearing tetrahedra.
