= Shigaite =

Mineral

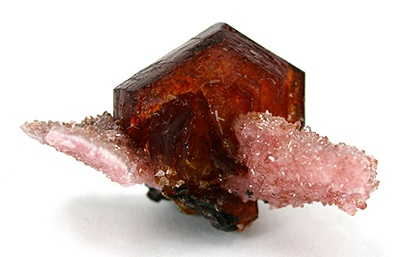
- Reddish-brown shigaite crystal (2 cm across) with pink rhodochrosite from South Africa

General
- Category: Sulfate mineral
- Formula: NaAl_{3}(Mn^{2+})_{6}(SO_{4})_{2}(OH)_{18}·12H_{2}O
- IMA symbol: Sga
- Strunz classification: 7.DD.35
- Dana classification: 31.1.2.1
- Crystal system: Trigonal
- Crystal class: Rhombohedral (3̅); H-M symbol: (3̅)
- Space group: R3̅
- Unit cell: a = 9.51 Å, c = 32.83 Å, Z = 3

Identification
- Color: Yellow, burnt orange, brown, black
- Twinning: On {0001}
- Cleavage: Perfect on {0001}
- Tenacity: Moderately flexible
- Mohs scale hardness: 2
- Luster: Vitreous to dull
- Streak: Very pale yellow to white
- Diaphaneity: Transparent
- Specific gravity: 2.32
- Optical properties: Uniaxial (−)
- Refractive index: n = 1.546
- Pleochroism: Distinct; O = yellow; E = very pale yellow
- Ultraviolet fluorescence: Non-fluorescent

Shigaite is a mineral with formula NaAl_{3}(Mn^{2+})_{6}(SO_{4})_{2}(OH)_{18}·12H_{2}O that typically occurs as small, hexagonal crystals or thin coatings. It is named for Shiga Prefecture, Japan, where it was discovered in 1985. The formula was significantly revised in 1996, identifying sodium as a previously unknown constituent.

== Description ==
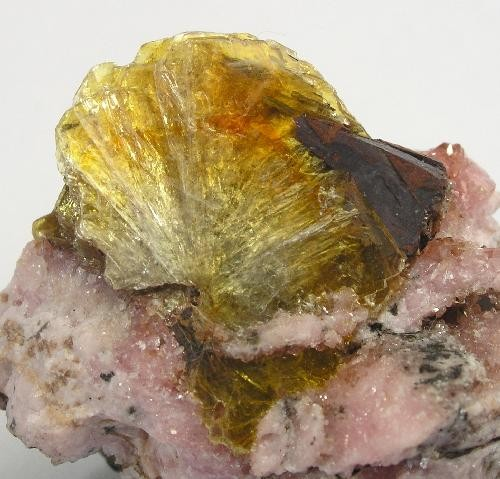
Dark-red and yellow shigaite on pink rhodochrosite

Shigaite occurs as hexagonal tabular crystals up to 2 cm (0.79 in) in size or as thin films and coatings. The mineral can be yellow, burnt orange, brown or black in color. Shigaite occurs in metamorphosed deposits of manganese ore and is the Mn^{2+} analogue of motukoreaite.

== Structure ==
Shigaite consists of oxycation sheets of [AlMn^{2+}_{2}(OH)_{6}]^{1+} intercalated with oxyanion sheets of [Na(H_{2}O)_{6}{H_{2}O}_{6}(SO_{4})_{2}]^{3−}. Linkage between the sheets and within the oxyanion sheet results largely through hydrogen bonding.

== History ==
Shigaite was discovered in 1985 in the Ioi Mine, (Note: Some sources incorrectly list it as the Loi Mine, presumably because of a mistaken reading of uppercase "i" as lowercase "L".) Shiga Prefecture, Japan. The original study, published in the journal Neues Jahrbuch für Mineralogie, Monatshefte, identified the formula as Al_{4}Mn_{7}(SO_{4})_{2}(OH)_{22}·8H_{2}O. The formula was significantly revised in 1996 using a sample from the N'Chwaning Mine, South Africa. Sodium, discovered to be a component of shigaite, was not identified in the original study. However, an unidentified volatile had been noted that presumably was a sodium-containing complex.

== Distribution ==
As of 2012, shigaite is known from the following sites:

- Iron Monarch open cut, South Australia, Australia
- Poudrette quarry, Quebec, Canada
- Ioi mine, Shiga Prefecture, Japan
- Wessels Mine, Northern Cape Province, South Africa
- N'Chwaning Mine, Northern Cape Province, South Africa
- Homer Mine, Michigan, United States
- Bengal Mine, Michigan, United States

The type material is housed in the National Museum of Natural History in Washington, D.C. as sample 122089.

== Association ==
Shigaite has been found associated with the following minerals:

Ioi mine, Japan

- rhodochrosite
- sonolite
- manganosite
- pyrochroite
- jacobsite
- hausmannite
- galaxite

Wessels Mine, South Africa

- rhodochrosite
- leucophoenicite
- gageite
- caryopilite

Iron Monarch, South Australia

- arsenoclasite
- gatehouseite
- hematite
- hausmannite
- manganoan ferroan calcite
- barite
- gypsum
