= Gatehouseite =

Manganese hydroxy phosphate mineral

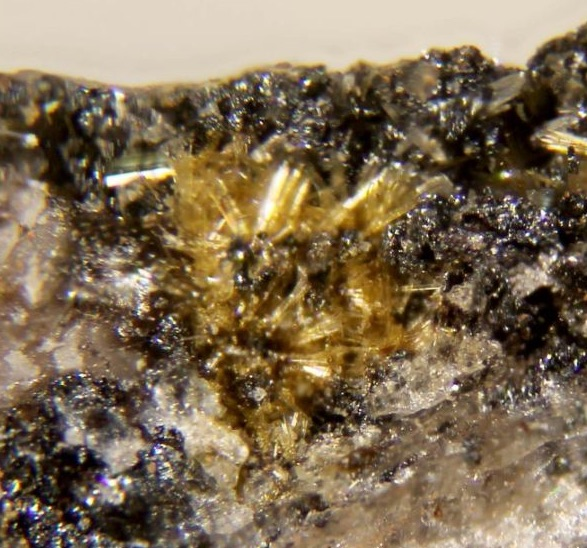

General
- Category: Phosphate mineral
- Formula: Mn_{5}(PO_{4})_{2}(OH)_{4}
- IMA symbol: Ghs
- Strunz classification: 8.BD.10
- Dana classification: 41.4.1.2
- Crystal system: Orthorhombic
- Crystal class: Disphenoidal (222) (same H-M symbol)
- Space group: P2_{1}2_{1}2_{1}
- Unit cell: a = 17.9733(18) Å b = 5.6916(11) Å c = 9.130(4) Å V = 933.9(4) Å^{3} Z = 4

Identification
- Color: Brownish orange to yellow
- Twinning: On {001}, contact twins
- Cleavage: Distinct on {010}
- Fracture: Splintery
- Mohs scale hardness: 4
- Luster: Adamantine
- Streak: Pale yellow
- Diaphaneity: Transparent
- Optical properties: Biaxial (+/−)
- Refractive index: α = 1.74(1), β = n.d., γ = 1.76(1)
- Birefringence: δ = 0.020
- Pleochroism: Distinct; brown to nearly colorless

Gatehouseite is a manganese hydroxy phosphate mineral with formula Mn_{5}(PO_{4})_{2}(OH)_{4}. First discovered in 1987, it was identified as a new mineral species in 1992 and named for Bryan M. K. C. Gatehouse (born 1932). As of 2012, it is known from only one mine in South Australia.

== Description ==
Gatehouseite occurs as radiating or divergent groups of bladelike crystals up to 100 μm by 20 μm by 5 μm in size and as overgrowths on arsenoclasite that are up to 5 mm long. The transparent mineral can be brownish-orange or yellow in color. Gatehouseite is the phosphorus analogue of arsenoclasite.

The mineral occurs in cavities in sedimentary iron and manganese deposits in association with arsenoclasite, shigaite, hematite, hausmannite, triploidite, barite, and manganoan ferroan calcite. Based on a 1977 experiment that produced triploidite, it is likely that gatehouseite formed by a reaction between hausmannite and basic phosphorus-rich fluids at low temperature and variable pH conditions.

== History ==
In May 1987, Glyn Francis, an employee at the Iron Monarch mine in South Australia, submitted for identification some mineral specimens from the mine to A. Pring. Very small, unidentified pale brownish orange crystals were seen in one specimen; study showed they had a formula of the type M_{5}(XO_{4})_{2}(OH)_{4} and contained manganese, phosphorus, and a minor quantity of arsenic. The powder X-ray diffraction pattern could not be recorded as insufficient material was available. Another specimen in the same group consisted of arsenoclasite crystals overgrown by what appeared to be its as yet undescribed phosphorus analogue. Francis later discovered more of the brownish orange crystals in sufficient quantity to obtain an X-ray diffraction pattern. This proved that the crystals and the overgrowths were the same, new mineral species.

Gathehouseite was named for Bryan Michael Kenneth Cummings Gatehouse for his contributions to the study of oxides and oxysalts. The Commission on New Minerals and Mineral Names recognized the mineral and approved its name in 1992 (IMA 1992-016).

Due to the small size and intergrowth of the crystals, single-crystal X-ray crystallography is difficult to perform on gatehouseite. In 2011, this technique was successfully used to determine the crystal structure of the mineral.

== Distribution ==
The type material is housed at the South Australian Museum in Adelaide and the Museum of Victoria in Melbourne. As of 2012, the Iron Monarch open cut remains the only site from which gatehouseite is known.

== Crystal structure ==
Gatehouseite has the space group P2_{1}2_{1}2_{1}. The crystal structure consists of Mn(O, OH)_{6} octahedra and PO_{4} tetrahedra. The five manganese sites are occupied by manganese and small amounts of magnesium. The two phosphorus sites are occupied by phosphorus and small amounts of silicon and arsenic.
