= Ferraioloite =

Hydrous phosphate mineral

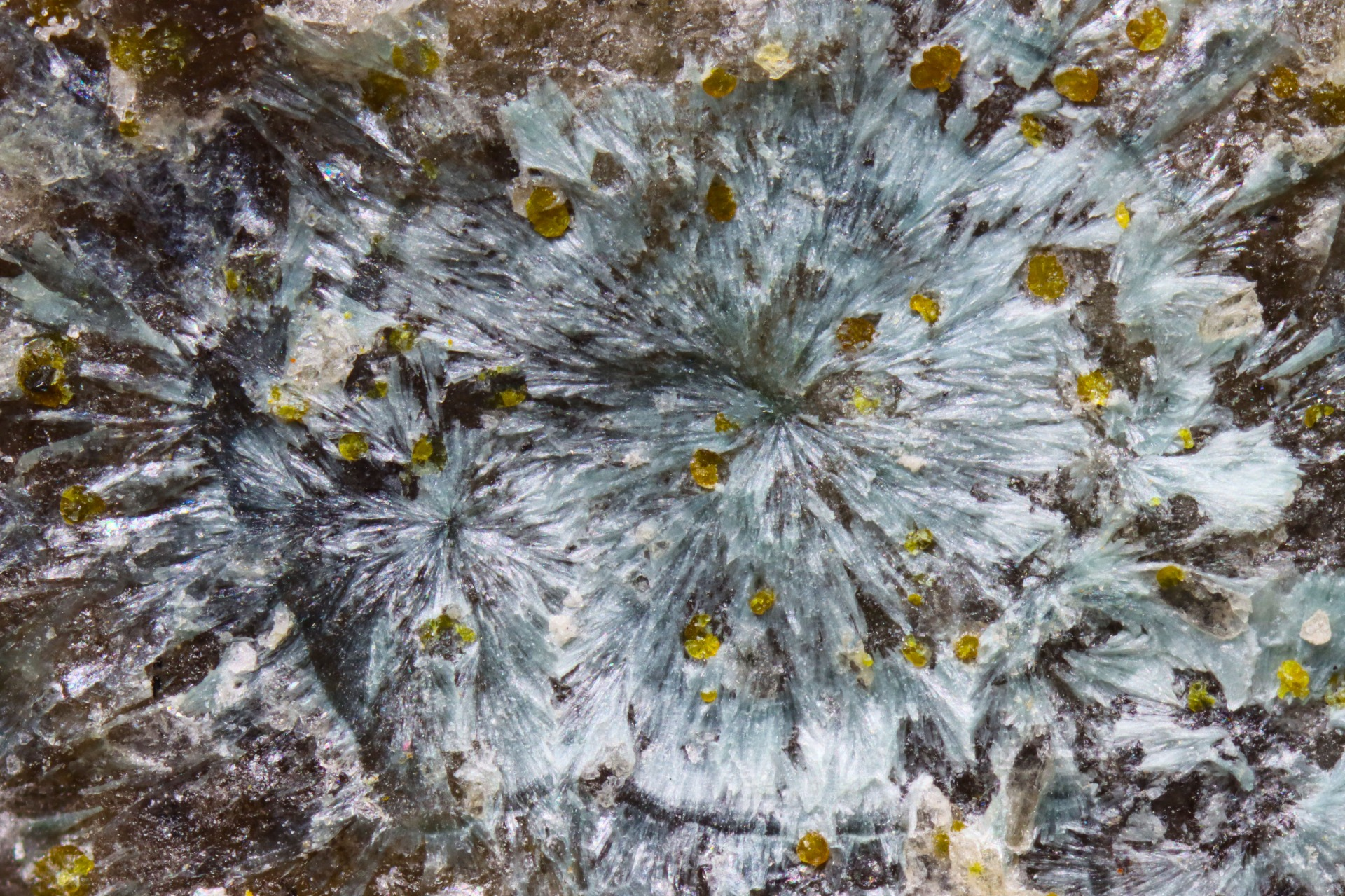

General
- Category: Phosphate mineral
- Formula: MgMn^{2+}_{4}(Fe^{2+}_{0.5}Al_{0.5})_{4}Zn_{4}(PO_{4})_{8}(OH)_{4}(H_{2}O)_{20}
- IMA symbol: Frl
- Crystal system: Monoclinic
- Crystal class: Prismatic (2/m) (same H-M symbol)
- Space group: I2/m
- Unit cell: a = 25.33, b = 6.30 c = 15.16 [Å], β = 90.93° (approximated)

Identification

Ferraioloite is a rare mineral with formula MgMn^{2+}_{4}(Fe^{2+}_{0.5}Al_{0.5})_{4}Zn_{4}(PO_{4})_{8}(OH)_{4}(H_{2}O)_{20}. It is related to the phosphate mineral falsterite. Ferraioloite was found in pegmatites of the Foote Lithium Company Mine, Cleveland County, North Carolina, US. The name honors James (Jim) A. Ferraiolo (1947–2014).
