= Anapaite =

Hydrous phosphate mineral

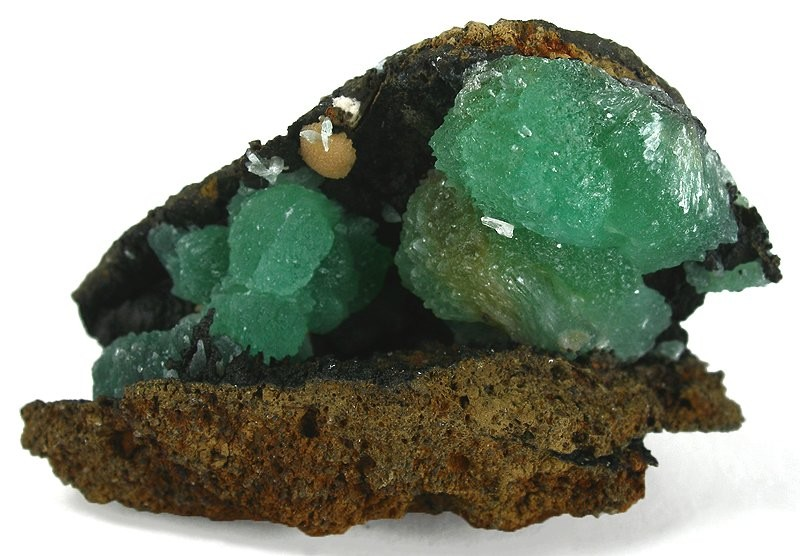
- Anapaite from Ukraine

General
- Category: Phosphate minerals
- Formula: Ca_{2}Fe^{2+}(PO_{4})_{2}·4H_{2}O
- IMA symbol: Anp
- Strunz classification: 8.CH.10
- Crystal system: Triclinic
- Crystal class: Pinacoidal (1̅)
- Space group: Triclinic; H-M symbol: (1̅); Space group: P1̅
- Unit cell: a = 6.447, b = 6.816 c = 5.898 [Å]; α = 101.64° β = 104.24°, γ = 70.76°; Z = 1

Identification
- Color: Green, greenish white to colorless
- Crystal habit: Tabular to bladed crystals, radiating clusters, incrustations, fibrous, and in nodules
- Cleavage: Perfect on {001}, distinct on {010}
- Tenacity: Flexible
- Mohs scale hardness: 3.5
- Luster: Vitreous
- Streak: White
- Diaphaneity: Transparent
- Specific gravity: 2.8
- Optical properties: Biaxial (+)
- Refractive index: n_{α}=1.602, n_{β}=1.613, n_{γ}=1.649
- Birefringence: δ = 0.047
- Pleochroism: Not visible
- 2V angle: Measured: 52° to 56°

Anapaite is a calcium–iron phosphate mineral with formula: Ca_{2}Fe^{2+}(PO_{4})_{2}·4H_{2}O. It is a mineral that typically occurs in cavities in fossil bearing sedimentary rocks. It is also found in phosphate bearing iron ores and rarely in pegmatites. It is commonly found with goethite, siderite and vivianite.

It was named after the type locality on the Black Sea coastal region of Anapa, Taman Peninsula, Russia. Noted localities include Kertch (Crimea, Ukraine), Bellver de Cerdanya (Lleida, Catalonia, Spain) and Valdarno, Tuscany, Italy.

== See also ==
- A list of minerals with associated Wikipedia articles
- List Viewing (in German)
