= Triploidite =

Phosphate mineral

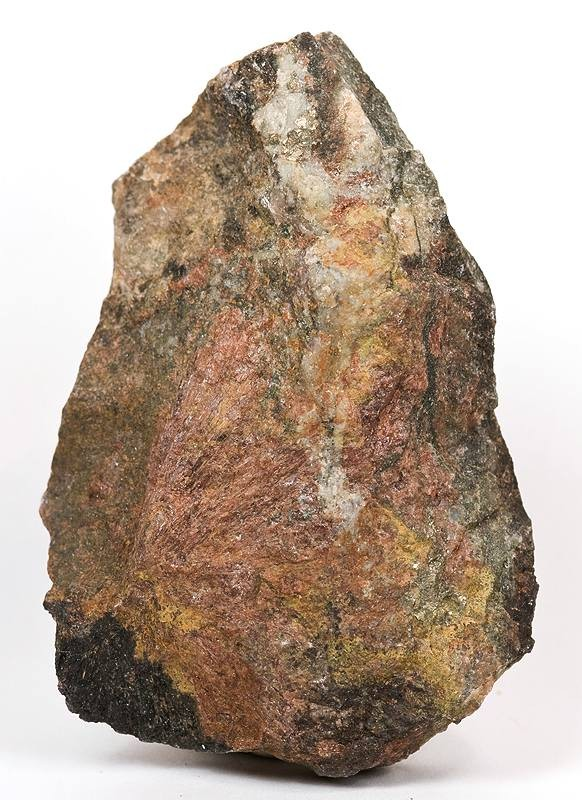
- Radial reddish triploidite from the Branchville Quarry, Branchville, Fairfield County, Connecticut, US (7.0 x 4.8 x 2.6 cm)

General
- Category: Phosphate minerals
- Formula: (Mn,Fe)_{2}PO_{4}OH
- IMA symbol: Tpd
- Strunz classification: 8.BB.15
- Crystal system: Monoclinic
- Crystal class: Prismatic (2/m) (same H-M symbol)
- Space group: P2_{1}/a
- Unit cell: a = 12.36 Å, b = 13.27 Å c = 9.94 Å; β = 108.23°; Z = 16

Identification
- Color: Red-brown, light pink, yellow-brown; light pink to light brown in transmitted light.
- Crystal habit: Elongated and striated prismatic crystals; fibrous: columnar to spherulitic
- Cleavage: On {010}, good; on {120}, fair; on {110}, very poor.
- Fracture: Uneven to subconchoidal
- Mohs scale hardness: 4 1/2 – 5
- Luster: Adamantine, vitreous, greasy
- Streak: White, off-white.
- Diaphaneity: Transparent, translucent
- Specific gravity: 3.70 measured
- Optical properties: Biaxial (+)
- Refractive index: n_{α} = 1.725 n_{β} = 1.726 n_{γ} = 1.730
- Birefringence: δ = 0.005
- Pleochroism: Weak
- Dispersion: r > v strong
- Solubility: Soluble in acids.

Triploidite is an uncommon manganese iron phosphate mineral with formula: (Mn, Fe)_{2}PO_{4}OH. It crystallizes in the monoclinic crystal system and typically occurs as elongated and striated slender prisms which may be columnar to fibrous. Its crystals may be pinkish to yellowish brown or red-orange.

It was first described in 1878 for an occurrence in the Branchville Quarry, Branchville, Fairfield County, Connecticut. The name is derived from its resemblance to triplite.

It typically occurs as a hydrothermal alteration product of primary phosphate minerals in granite pegmatites. It occurs with triplite, lithiophilite, triphylite, eosphorite, dickinsonite and rhodochrosite.

It forms a solid solution series with the iron rich wolfeite.

== See also ==
- Classification of minerals
- List of minerals
