= Hureaulite =

Manganese phosphate mineral

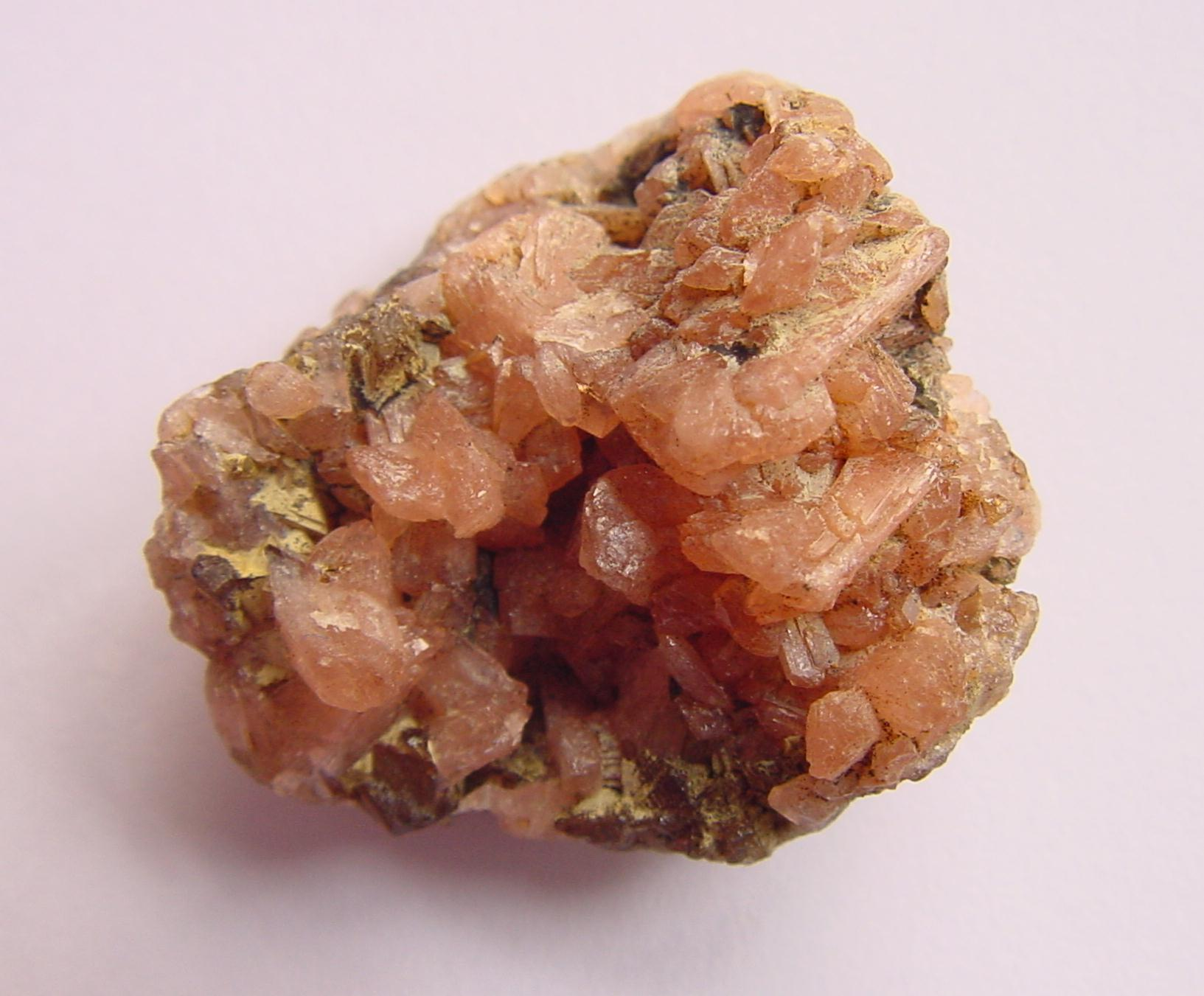
- Hureaulite from the Cigana Claim, Conselheiro Pena, Minas Gerais, Brazil. Specimen size 2.8 cm.

General
- Category: Phosphate minerals
- Formula: Mn^{2+}_{5}(PO_{3}OH)_{2}(PO_{4})_{2}·4H_{2}O
- IMA symbol: Hur
- Strunz classification: 8.CB.10 (10 ed); 7/C.04-10 (8 ed)
- Dana classification: 39.2.1.1
- Crystal system: Monoclinic
- Crystal class: Prismatic (2/m) (same H-M symbol)
- Space group: C2/c
- Unit cell: a = 17.594(10) Å b = 9.086(5) Å c = 9.404(5) Å β = 96.67(8)°; Z = 4

Identification
- Formula mass: 728.65 g/mol
- Colour: Orange, red, yellow, brown, grey or nearly colourless
- Crystal habit: Crystals are short prismatic parallel to (100) or equant, sometimes thick tabular, also massive or imperfectly fibrous
- Cleavage: {100} good
- Fracture: Uneven
- Tenacity: Brittle
- Mohs scale hardness: 3.5
- Lustre: Vitreous to greasy
- Streak: Nearly white
- Diaphaneity: Transparent to translucent
- Specific gravity: 3.18–3.2 (measured), 3.23 (calculated)
- Optical properties: Biaxial (−)
- Refractive index: n_{α} = 1.640 – 1.654 n_{β} = 1.649 – 1.659 n_{γ} = 1.655 – 1.662
- Birefringence: δ = 0.012
- Pleochroism: X colourless, Y yellow to pale rose, Z reddish yellow to reddish brown
- 2V angle: greater than 60°
- Dispersion: r<v, very strong
- Solubility: Easily soluble in acids.

Hureaulite is a manganese phosphate with the formula Mn^{2+}_{5}(PO_{3}OH)_{2}(PO_{4})_{2}·4H_{2}O. It was discovered in 1825 and named in 1826 for the type locality, Les Hureaux, Saint-Sylvestre, Haute-Vienne, Limousin, France. It is sometimes written as huréaulite, but the IMA does not recommend this for English language text.

A complete series exists from lithiophilite, LiMn^{2+}PO_{4} to triphylite, LiFe^{2+}PO_{4}, including hureaulite, strengite, FePO_{4}·2H_{2}O, stewartite, Mn^{2+}Fe^{3+}_{2}(OH,PO_{4})_{2}·8H_{2}O, and sicklerite, (LiMn^{2+},Fe^{3+})PO_{4}.

== Environment ==
Hureaulite is a secondary mineral occurring in granite pegmatites. At the type locality it occurs in a zone of altered triphylite, LiMn^{2+}PO_{4}, in pegmatite. Typically occurs very late in the sequence of formation of secondary phosphate minerals. Associated at the type locality with vivianite, Fe^{2+}_{3}(PO_{4})_{2}·8H_{2}O; rockbridgeite, Fe^{2+}Fe^{3+}_{4}(PO_{4})_{3}(OH)_{5}; heterosite, (Fe^{3+},Mn^{3+})PO_{4} and cacoxenite, Fe^{3+}_{24}AlO_{6}(PO_{4})_{17}(OH)_{12}·17H_{2}O. It can be synthesised; most natural hureaulites are Mn-rich compounds but extensive (Mn,Fe) solution is known for synthetic material.

== Localities ==
The type locality is Les Hureaux, Saint-Sylvestre, Haute-Vienne, Limousin, France. Hureaulite is also found in a granite pegmatite known for its phosphates in the Aimorés pegmatite district, at the Cigana claim in Galiléia, Doce valley, Minas Gerais, Brazil, formerly known as the Jocão Mine.
