= Triplite =

Phosphate mineral

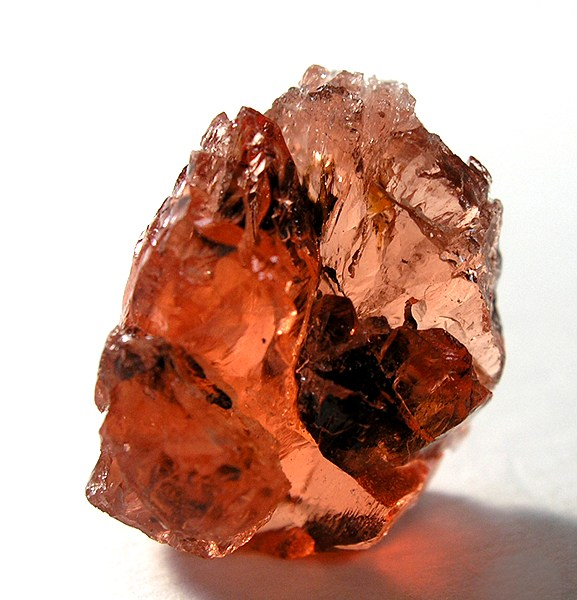
- Triplite from Alchuri, Shigar Valley, Baltistan, Pakistan (1.2 × 1 × 0.9 cm)

General
- Category: Phosphate minerals
- Formula: (Mn,Fe)_{2}(PO_{4})(F,OH)
- IMA symbol: Trl
- Strunz classification: 8.BB.10
- Crystal system: Monoclinic
- Crystal class: Prismatic (2/m) (same H-M symbol)
- Space group: I2/a (no. 15)
- Unit cell: a = 11.97 Å, b = 6.52 Å c = 10.09 Å; β = 105.62°; Z = 8

Identification
- Color: Chestnut to reddish brown, flesh-red, salmon-pink
- Crystal habit: Prismatic, massive to nodular
- Cleavage: Good on {001}, fair on {010}, poor on {100}
- Fracture: Uneven to subconchoidal
- Mohs scale hardness: 5 to 5.5
- Luster: Vitreous to resinous
- Streak: White to brown
- Diaphaneity: Translucent to opaque
- Specific gravity: 3.5 – 3.9
- Optical properties: Biaxial (+)
- Refractive index: n_{α}=1.643–1.684, n_{β}=1.647–1.693, n_{γ}=1.668–1.703
- Pleochroism: Distinct; yellow-brown to reddish brown
- 2V angle: 25 – 76°
- Dispersion: r > v, moderate to strong
- Alters to: Alters to brownish black

Triplite is a rare phosphate mineral with formula: (Mn, Fe)_{2}PO_{4}(F, OH). It occurs in phosphate-rich granitic pegmatites typically as irregular brown opaque masses. Triplite was first described in 1813 for an occurrence in Chanteloube, Limousin, France. The name is from the Greek triplos for triple, in reference to the three cleavage directions. In color and appearance, it is very similar to rhodocrosite, another manganese bearing mineral. Chemically, it is also quite similar to triploidite the difference being that triplite is fluorine dominant while triploidite is hydroxide dominant.

== Occurrence ==
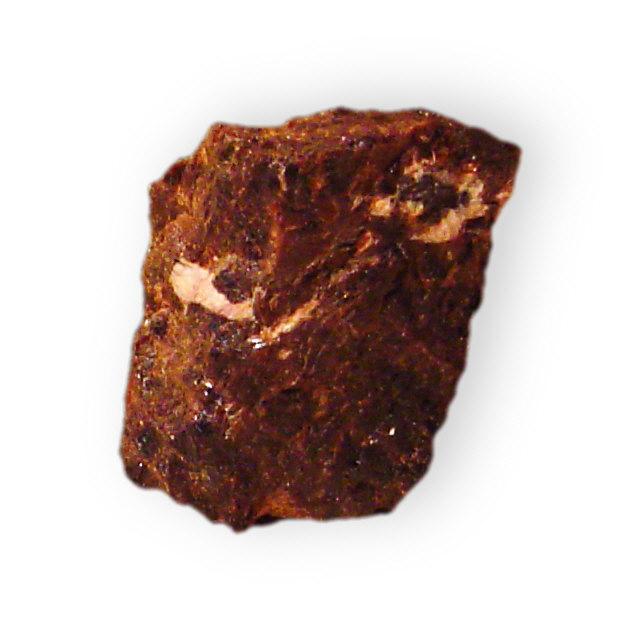
Triplite from Colorado

Triplite is a rare fluoro-hydroxide phosphate mineral that forms in phosphate rich granite pegmatites and high temperature hydrothermal veins. It has been found in the United States in California, Nevada, Arizona, Colorado, South Dakota, Virginia, Connecticut, and Maine. Other occurrences include the Shigar Valley, Pakistan; China; Bavaria, Germany; Kimito, Finland and Karibib, Namibia.
