= Eosphorite =

Phosphate mineral

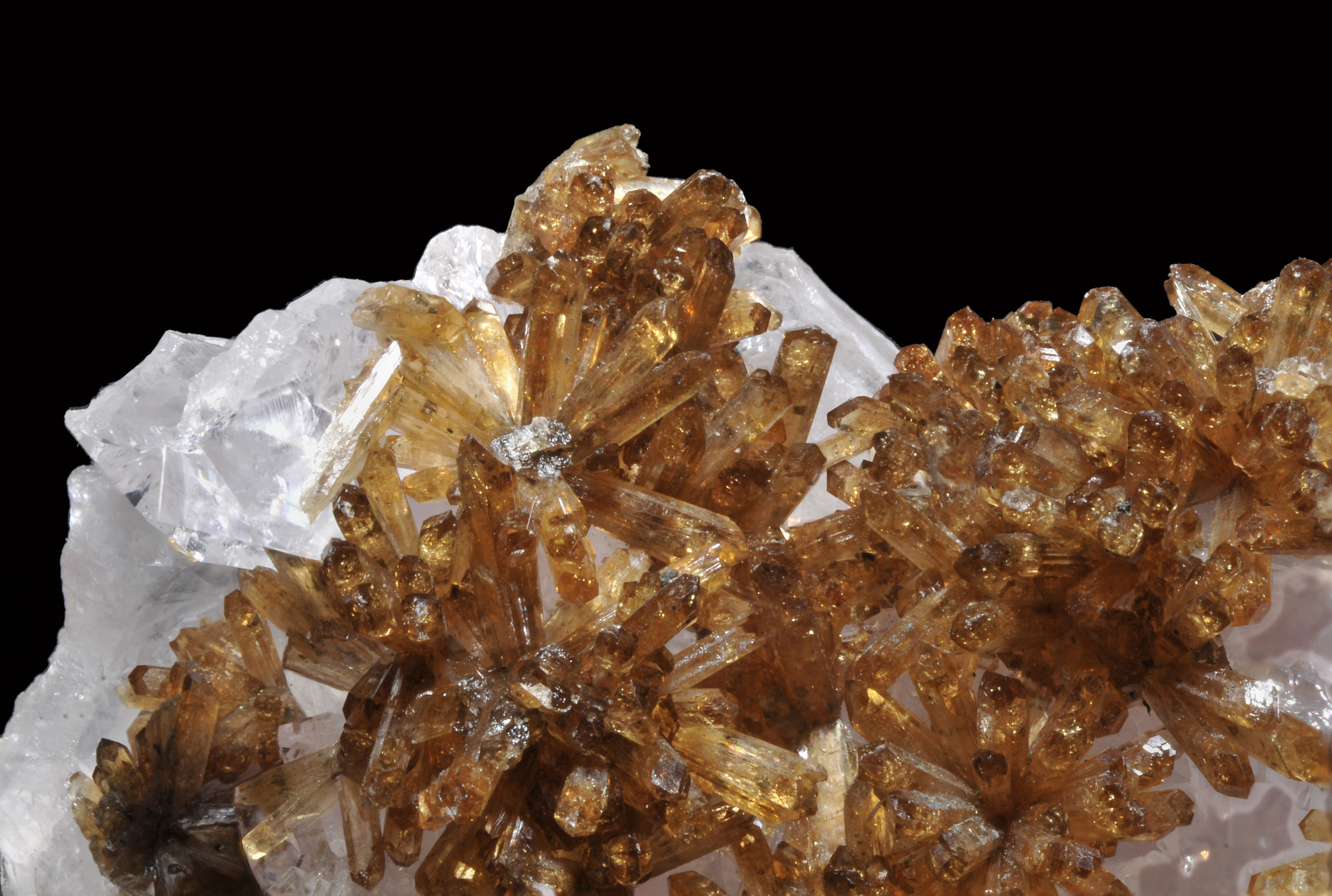

General
- Category: Phosphate mineral
- Formula: MnAl(PO_{4})(OH)_{2}·H_{2}O
- IMA symbol: Eos
- Strunz classification: 8.DD.20
- Crystal system: Orthorhombic
- Crystal class: Dipyramidal (mmm); H-M symbol: (2/m 2/m 2/m)
- Space group: Cmca
- Unit cell: a = 10.455(1), b = 13.501(2) c = 6.928(1) [Å]; β = 90°; Z = 8

Identification
- Color: usually pale brown, golden brown, also medium brown to dark brown; occasionally pink, rose red
- Crystal habit: Prismatic in radiating sprays or spheres, massive; twinned pseudo-orthorhombic
- Twinning: May be observed on {100} and {001}
- Cleavage: Poor on {100}
- Fracture: Subconchoidal to uneven
- Mohs scale hardness: 5
- Luster: Vitreous, resinous
- Streak: White
- Diaphaneity: Transparent to translucent
- Specific gravity: 3.06 – 3.08
- Optical properties: Biaxial (-)
- Refractive index: n_{α} = 1.628 - 1.639 n_{β} = 1.648 - 1.664 n_{γ} = 1.657 - 1.671
- Birefringence: δ = 0.029 - 0.032
- Pleochroism: Visible: X = yellow; Y = pink; Z = pale pink to colorless
- 2V angle: Measured: 50°
- Alters to: Oxidizes to brown or black

Eosphorite is a brown (occasionally pink) manganese hydrous phosphate mineral with chemical formula: MnAl(PO_{4})(OH)_{2}·H_{2}O. It is used as a gemstone.

Eosphorite crystallizes in the monoclinic crystal system. It forms slender prismatic crystals which often form radiating or spherical clusters. The crystals often show pseudo–orthorhombic forms due to twinning.

Eosphorite forms a series with childrenite, the iron-rich member, with divalent iron replacing most of the manganese in the crystal lattice. The two endmembers are isostructural but differ in their properties, such as crystal habit, coloration, and optical properties.

It was first described in 1878 for an occurrence in the Branchville Mica Mine in Branchville, Fairfield County, Connecticut, US. Its name is derived from the Greek έωσφορος for "dawn-bearing," because of its pink color. It occurs worldwide typically as a secondary mineral in phosphate-rich granitic pegmatites in association with rhodochrosite, lithiophilite, triphylite, triploidite, dickinsonite, albite, cookeite, apatite, beryllonite, hydroxyl-herderite, and tourmaline. An attractive combination of eosphorite and rose quartz occurs at Taquaral, Minas Gerais, Brazil.
