= Purpurite =

Phosphate mineral

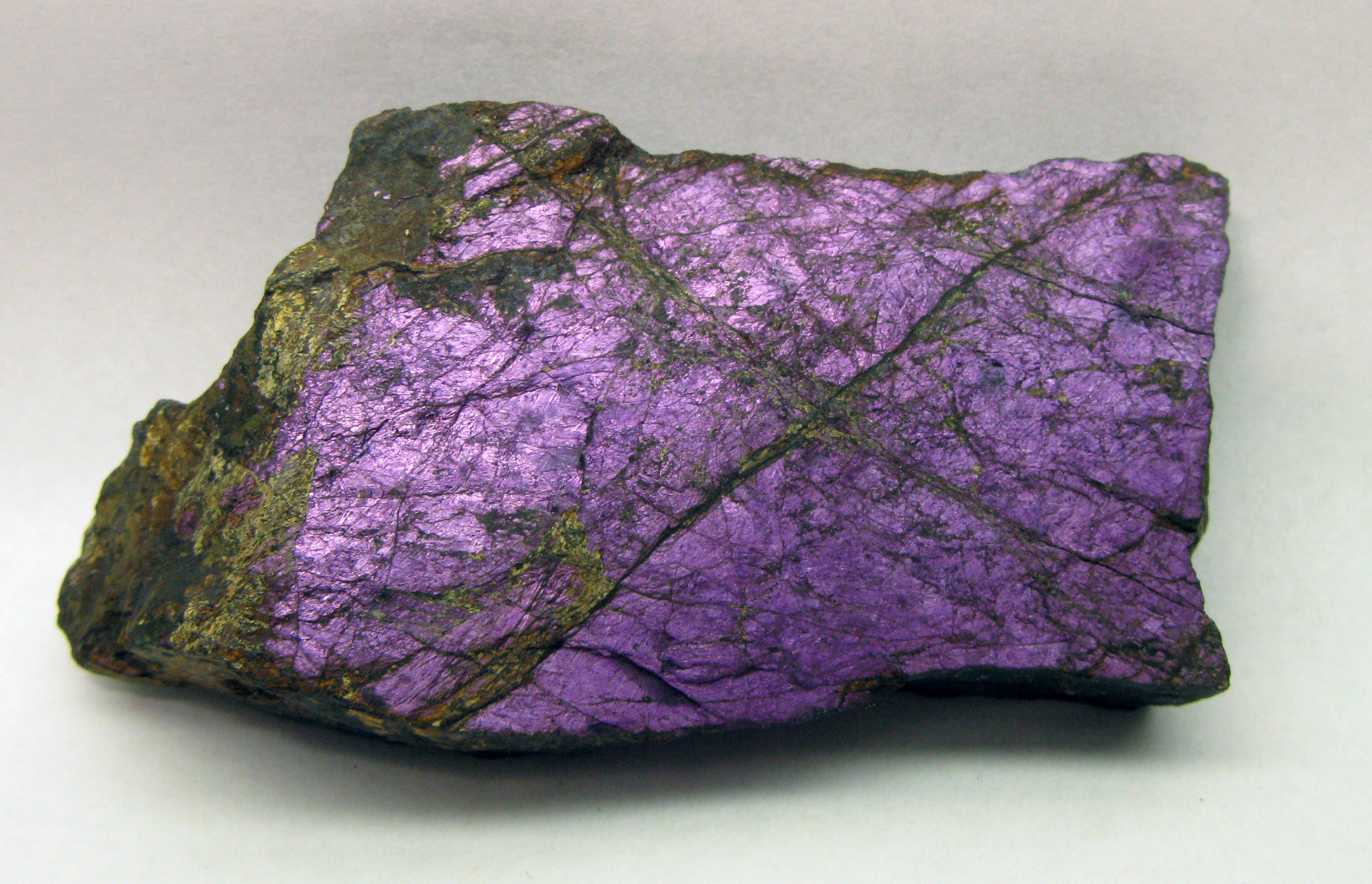
- Purpurite from Namibia

General
- Category: Phosphate minerals
- Formula: Mn^{3+}PO_{4}
- IMA symbol: Pur
- Strunz classification: 8.AB.10
- Crystal system: Orthorhombic
- Crystal class: Dipyramidal (mmm); H-M symbol: (2/m 2/m 2/m)
- Space group: Pnmb

Identification
- Formula mass: 149.91 g/mol
- Color: Brownish black, violet, dark pink, dark red, reddish purple
- Crystal habit: Massive to granular
- Cleavage: [100] [001] perfect
- Fracture: Uneven
- Tenacity: Brittle
- Mohs scale hardness: 4–5
- Luster: Earthy
- Streak: red
- Specific gravity: 3.2 – 3.4
- Optical properties: Biaxial (+)
- Refractive index: nα = 1.850(2) nβ = 1.860(2) nγ = 1.920(2)
- Birefringence: δ = 0.070
- 2V angle: 38°

Purpurite is a manganese phosphate mineral with the formula MnPO_{4}, with varying amounts of iron depending upon its source. It occurs in color ranges from brownish black to purple and violet to dark red.

Purpurite forms a series with the iron-bearing endmember heterosite, FePO_{4}.

== See also ==
- Manganese violet
