= Lithiophilite =

Mineral

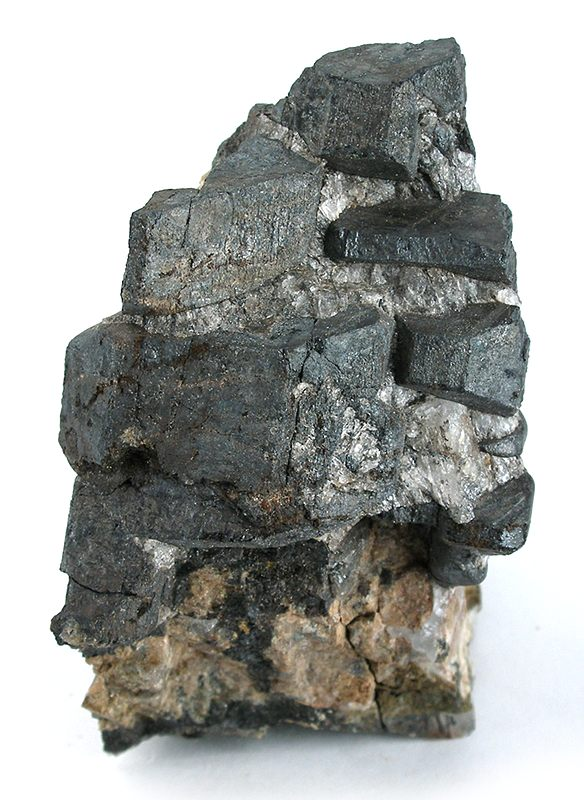

General
- Category: Phosphate minerals
- Formula: LiMnPO_{4}
- IMA symbol: Lhp
- Strunz classification: 8.AB.10
- Crystal system: Orthorhombic
- Crystal class: Dipyramidal (mmm); H-M symbol: (2/m 2/m 2/m)
- Space group: Pmnb (if holohedral)

Identification
- Color: Clove-brown, yellowish brown, honey-yellow, salmon-pink, blue-gray, gray
- Crystal habit: Prismatic – crystals shaped like slender prisms, stout prismatic, large single crystals, massive, oriented overgrowths
- Twinning: Rare contact twins on {130}
- Cleavage: [100] perfect, [110] and [011] poor
- Fracture: uneven to conchoidal
- Mohs scale hardness: 4–5
- Luster: Vitreous to subresinous
- Streak: White to grayish white
- Diaphaneity: Transparent to translucent
- Specific gravity: 3.445–3.50
- Optical properties: Biaxial (+), 2V = 65°
- Refractive index: n_{α} = 1.669, n_{β} = 1.673, n_{γ} = 1.682
- Birefringence: δ = 0.0130
- Pleochroism: None to weak

Lithiophilite is a mineral containing the element lithium. It is lithium manganese(II) phosphate with chemical formula LiMnPO_{4}. It occurs in pegmatites often associated with triphylite, the iron end member in a solid solution series. The mineral with intermediate composition is known as sicklerite and has the chemical formula Li(Mn,Fe)PO_{4}. The name lithiophilite is derived from the Greek philos (φιλός) "friend", as lithiophilite is usually found with lithium.

Lithiophylite is a resinous reddish to yellowish brown mineral crystallizing in the orthorhombic system often as slender prisms. It is usually associated with lepidolite, beryl, quartz, albite, amblygonite, and spodumene of pegmatitic origin. It rather readily weathers to a variety of secondary manganese phosphates and oxides. It is a late-stage mineral in some complex granite pegmatites. Members of the triphylite-lithiophilite series readily alter to secondary minerals.

The type locality is the Branchville Quarry, Branchville, Fairfield County, Connecticut where it was first reported in 1878. The largest documented single crystal of lithiophilite was found in New Hampshire, US, measured 2.44×1.83×1.22 m^{3} and weighed about 20 tonnes.

The synthetic form of triphylite, lithium iron phosphate, is a promising material for the production of lithium-ion batteries.

== Bibliography ==
- Palache, P.; Berman H.; Frondel, C. (1960). "Dana's System of Mineralogy, Volume II: Halides, Nitrates, Borates, Carbonates, Sulfates, Phosphates, Arsenates, Tungstates, Molybdates, Etc. (Seventh Edition)" John Wiley and Sons, Inc., New York, pp. 665–669.
