= Triphylite =

Mineral

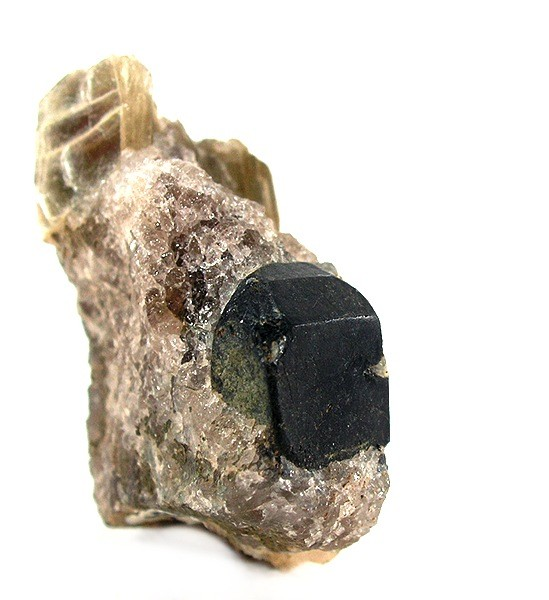
- Triphylite crystal in matrix, collected from Smith Quarry (Chandler Mills Quarry), Newport, New Hampshire 43°21′28″N 72°15′8″W

General
- Category: Phosphate minerals
- Formula: LiFePO_{4}
- IMA symbol: Trp
- Strunz classification: 8.AB.10
- Crystal system: Orthorhombic
- Crystal class: Dipyramidal (mmm); H-M symbol: (2/m 2/m 2/m)
- Space group: Pmnb
- Unit cell: a = 6.0285(6) Å, b = 10.3586(9) Å, c = 4.7031(3) Å, Z = 4

Identification
- Color: Green–blue gray, brown–black
- Crystal habit: Massive, granular, prismatic
- Cleavage: {100} perfect, {010} imperfect, {011} poor
- Fracture: Uneven–subconchoidal
- Mohs scale hardness: 4–5
- Luster: Vitreous–subresinous
- Streak: White–grayish white
- Diaphaneity: Transparent–translucent
- Optical properties: Biaxial (+), 2V = 0°–65°
- Refractive index: n_{α}=1.675–1.694, n_{β}=1.684–1.695, n_{γ}=1.685–1.700
- Birefringence: δ = 0.0060–0.0080

Triphylite is a lithium iron(II) phosphate mineral with the chemical formula LiFePO_{4}. It is a member of the triphylite group and forms a complete solid solution series with the lithium manganese(II) phosphate, lithiophilite. Triphylite crystallizes in the orthorhombic crystal system. It rarely forms prismatic crystals and is more frequently found in hypidiomorphic rock. It is bluish- to greenish-gray in color, but upon alteration becomes brown to black.

== Etymology and history ==
The mineral was first discovered and examined in 1834 by German mineralogist Johann Nepomuk von Fuchs at Hennenkobel Mine in the Bavarian Forest. The name derives from the Greek words tri ("three") and phulon ("family"), referring to the three cations found in natural samples of triphylite (Li^{+}, Fe^{2+}, Mn^{2+}).

== Crystal structure ==
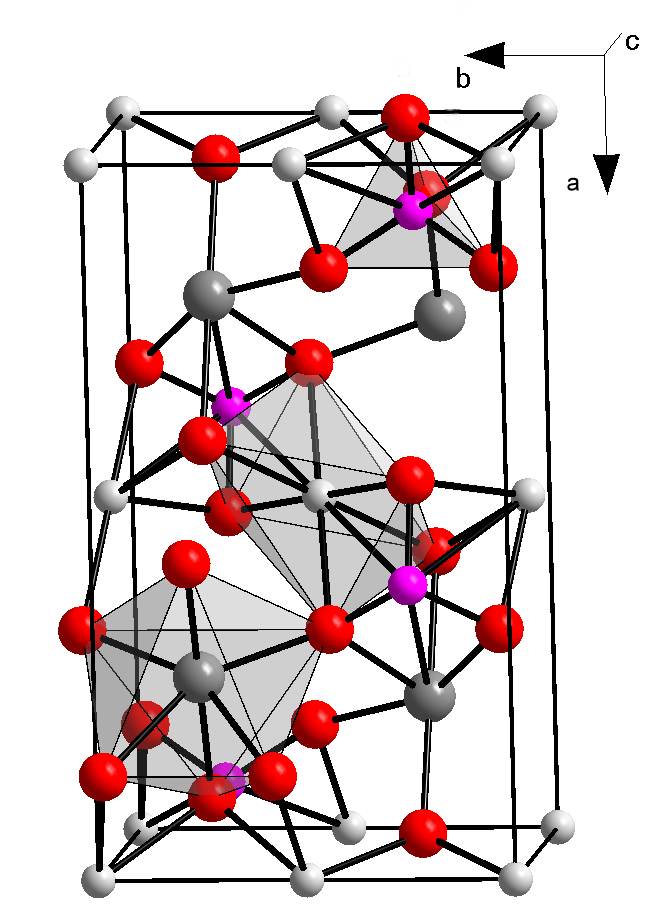
Crystal structure of triphylite

Triphylite crystallizes in an orthorhombic crystal system. The lithium coordinates to six oxygen atoms in a distorted octahedron. Likewise, the iron centers are octahedrally coordinated. The structure contains isolated phosphate tetrahedra.

== Properties ==
Triphylite is soluble in hydrochloric and sulfuric acid. Under a blowpipe, it melts to form a dark gray, magnetic ball. Over time, the mineral undergoes alteration by oxidation, increasing the oxidation state of iron from +2 to +3 and allowing the lithium to escape, forming heterosite, FePO_{4}.

Triphylite forms a complex solution series with lithiophilite, LiMnPO_{4}, so that natural sources of triphylite usually contain manganese. The structures of members within this series are similar to olivine-type silicates.
