= List of mineral symbols =

Mineral symbols (text abbreviations) are used to abbreviate mineral groups, subgroups, and species, just as lettered symbols are used for the chemical elements.

The first set of commonly used mineral symbols was published in 1983 and covered the common rock-forming minerals using 192 two- or three-lettered symbols. These types of symbols are referred to as Kretz symbols. More extensive lists were subsequently made available in the form of publications or posted on journal webpages.

A comprehensive list of more than 5,700 IMA-CNMNC approved symbols (referred to as IMA symbols) compiled by L.N. Warr was published in volume 85 (issue 3) of the Mineralogical Magazine (2021). These symbols are listed alphabetically in the tables below. The approved listings are compatible with the system used to symbolize the elements, 30 of which occur as minerals.

Mineral symbols are most commonly represented by three-lettered text symbols, although one-, two- and four-lettered symbols also exist. Four methods of nomenclature are used:

1. The initial letters of a name, for example: cyanotrichite: Cya and mitscherlichite: Mits.
2. A combination considered characteristic of the mineral name, for example: ewingite: Ewg and neighborite: Nbo.
3. A selection of letters expressing components of the name, for example: adranosite = Arn and hellandite: Hld.
4. Lettered abbreviations when prefixes are present, for example: chlorocalcite = Ccal and nickelzippeite: Nizip.

New minerals approved by the International Mineralogical Association (IMA-CNMNC) are allocated unique symbols consistent with the main listing. New symbols are announced in the newsletters of the IMA-CNMNC. An updated "mineral symbol picker" list is also available for checking on the availability of symbols prior to submission for approval.

== A ==
Name	Symbol	Name	Symbol	Name	Symbol	Name	Symbol
Abellaite	Abe	Allanpringite	Apg	Annabergite	Anb	Arsenquatrandorite	Aado
Abelsonite	Abl	Allantoin	Aan	Annite	Ann	Arsentsumebite	Atsu
Abenakiite-(Ce)	Abk-Ce	Allargentum	All	Anorpiment	Apm	Arsenudinaite	Audn
Abernathyite	Abn	Alleghanyite	Alh	Anorthite	An	Arsenuranospathite	Aush
Abhurite	Abh	Allendeite	Aed	Anorthoclase	Ano	Arsenuranylite	Auy
Abramovite	Abm	Allochalcoselite	Acc	Anorthominasragrite	Amrg	Arsiccioite	Asi
Abswurmbachite	Abs	Alloclasite	Acl	Ansermetite	Anm	Arsmirandite	Asm
Abuite	Abu	Allophane	Alp	Antarcticite	Atc	Arthurite	Atu
Acanthite	Aca	Alloriite	Aor	Anthoinite	Atn	Artinite	Art
Acetamide	Ace	Alluaivite	Aav	Anthonyite	Aty	Artroeite	Ate
Achalaite	Ahl	Alluaudite	Ald	Anthophyllite	Ath	Artsmithite	Ash
Achávalite	Ahv	Almandine	Alm	Antigorite	Atg	Arupite	Arp
Achyrophanite	Aph	Almarudite	Alr	Antimonselite	Atm	Arzrunite	Arz
Acmonidesite	Acm	Almeidaite	Amd	Antimony (stibium)*	Sb	Asbecasite	Abc
Actinolite	Act	Alnaperbøeite-(Ce)	Apbø-Ce	Antipinite	Atp	Asbolane	Asb
Acuminite	Acu	Alpeite	Apt	Antlerite	Atl	Aschamalmite	Ahm
Adachiite	Adc	Alpersite	Aps	Antofagastaite	Atf	Ashburtonite	Ahb
Adamite	Ad	Alsakharovite-Zn	Ask-Zn	Anyuiite	Any	Ashcroftine-(Y)	Acf-Y
Adamsite-(Y)	Ads-Y	Alstonite	Asn	Anzaite-(Ce)	Anz-Ce	Ashoverite	Aov
Adanite	Adn	Altaite	Alt	Apachite	Apa	Asimowite	Amw
Addibischoffite	Add	Alterite	Atr	Apatite	Ap	Asisite	Ass
Adelite	Ade	Althausite	Ahs	Apexite	Ape	Åskagenite-(Nd)	Åsk-Nd
Admontite	Amt	Althupite	Ahp	Aphthitalite	Att	Aspedamite	Apd
Adolfpateraite	Adp	Altisite	Ati	Apjohnite	Apj	Aspidolite	Asp
Adranosite	Arn	Alum-(K)	Aum-K	Aplowite	Apw	Asselbornite	Asbn
Adranosite-(Fe)	Arn-Fe	Alum-(Na)	Aum-Na	Apophyllite	Apo	Astrocyanite-(Ce)	Acy-Ce
Adrianite	Adt	Aluminite	A	Apuanite	Apu	Astrophyllite	Ast
Aegirine	Aeg	Aluminium	Al	Aqualite	Aq	Atacamite	Ata
Aegirine-Augite	Aeg-Aug	Aluminoceladonite	Acel	Aradite	Ara	Atelestite	Ale
Aenigmatite	Aen	Aluminocerite-(Ce)	Acrt-Ce	Aragonite	Arg	Atelisite-(Y)	Ael-Y
Aerinite	Aer	Aluminocopiapite	Acpi	Arakiite	Ark	Atencioite	Aco
Aerugite	Aru	Aluminocoquimbite	Acoq	Aramayoite	Ary	Athabascaite	Atb
Aeschynite-(Ce)	Aes-Ce	Aluminomagnesiohulsite	Amhul	Arangasite	Ans	Atheneite	Ah
Aeschynite-(Nd)	Aes-Nd	Alumino-oxy-rossmanite	Aorsm	Arapovite	Apv	Atlasovite	Atv
Aeschynite-(Y)	Aes-Y	Aluminopyracmonite	Apyr	Aravaipaite	Avp	Atokite	Ato
Afghanite	Afg	Aluminosilicate	Als	Aravaite	Arv	Attakolite	Ako
Afmite	Afm	Aluminosugilite	Asug	Arcanite	Acn	Attikaite	Atk
Afwillite	Afw	Alumoåkermanite	Aåk	Archerite	Aht	Aubertite	Aub
Agaite	Aga	Alumoedtollite	Aedt	Arctite	Arc	Auerbakhite	Aue
Agakhanovite-(Y)	Agk-Y	Alumohydrocalcite	Ahcal	Arcubisite	Acb	Augelite	Aul
Agardite-Ce	Agr-Ce	Alumoklyuchevskite	Akyv	Ardaite	Ada	Augite	Aug
Agardite-La	Agr-La	Alumotantite	Atan	Ardealite	Adl	Auriacusite	Aur
Agardite-Nd	Agr-Nd	Alumovesuvianite	Aves	Ardennite-(As)	Ard-As	Aurichalcite	Ach
Agardite-Y	Agr-Y	Alunite	Alu	Ardennite-(V)	Ard-V	Auricupride	Auc
Agmantinite	Agm	Alunogen	Alg	Arfvedsonite	Arf	Aurihydrargyrumite	Ahg
Agrellite	Are	Alvanite	Alv	Argandite	Agd	Aurivilliusite	Avl
Agricolaite	Agc	Alwilkinsite-(Y)	Alw-Y	Argentobaumhauerite	Abha	Aurorite	Aro
Agrinierite	Agn	Amakinite	Amk	Argentodufrénoysite	Aduf	Aurostibite	Ausb
Aguilarite	Agu	Amamoorite	Amo	Argentojarosite	Agjrs	Austinite	Aus
Aheylite	Ahe	Amarantite	Ama	Argentoliveingite	Aliv	Autunite	Aut
Ahlfeldite	Afe	Amarillite	Amr	Argentopearceite	Apea	Avdeevite	Avd
Ahrensite	Ahr	Amblygonite	Aby	Argentopentlandite	Apn	Avdoninite	Avn
Aikinite	Aik	Ambrinoite	Amb	Argentopyrite	Agpy	Averievite	Avv
Aiolosite	Aio	Ameghinite	Agh	Argentotennantite-(Zn)	Atnt-Zn	Avicennite	Avc
Airdite	Air	Amesite	Ame	Argentotetrahedrite-(Fe)	Attr-Fe	Avogadrite	Avg
Ajoite	Aj	Amicite	Ami	Argentotetrahedrite-(Hg)	Attr-Hg	Awaruite	Awr
Akaganeite	Akg	Aminoffite	Amf	Argentotetrahedrite-(Zn)	Attr-Zn	Axelite	Axe
Akaogiite	Aka	Ammineite	Amm	Argesite	Age	Axinite-(Fe)	Ax-Fe
Akatoreite	Akt	Ammonioalunite	Aalu	Argutite	Agt	Axinite-(Mg)	Ax-Mg
Akdalaite	Akd	Ammonioborite	Abo	Argyrodite	Agy	Axinite-(Mn)	Ax-Mn
Åkermanite	Åk	Ammoniojarosite	Ajrs	Arhbarite	Arh	Azoproite	Azo
Akhtenskite	Akh	Ammoniolasalite	Alas	Ariegilatite	Agi	Azurite	Azu
Akimotoite	Aki	Ammonioleucite	Alct	Arisite-(Ce)	Ari-Ce		
Aklimaite	Akm	Ammoniomagnesiovoltaite	Amvlt	Arisite-(La)	Ari-La		
Akopovaite	Av	Ammoniomathesiusite	Amat	Aristarainite	Ais		
Akrochordite	Akr	Ammoniotinsleyite	Atin	Armalcolite	Arm		
Aksaite	Aks	Ammoniovoltaite	Avlt	Armangite	Amg		
Aktashite	Ats	Ammoniozippeite	Azip	Armbrusterite	Abr		
Alabandite	Abd	Amphibole	Amp	Armellinoite-(Ce)	Aml-Ce		
Alacránite	Acr	Amstallite	Ams	Armenite	Amn		
Alamosite	Aam	Analcime	Anl	Armstrongite	Asg		
Alarsite	Ars	Anandite	Ana	Arrheniusite-(Ce)	Arr-Ce		
Albertiniite	Abt	Anapaite	Anp	Arrojadite-(BaFe)	Ajd-BaFe		
Albite	Ab	Anastasenkoite	Aas	Arrojadite-(BaNa)	Ajd-BaNa		
Albrechtschraufite	Asf	Anatase	Ant	Arrojadite-(KFe)	Ajd-KFe		
Alburnite	Alb	Anatolyite	Aly	Arrojadite-(KNa)	Ajd-KNa		
Alcantarillaite	Alc	Ancylite-(Ce)	Anc-Ce	Arrojadite-(PbFe)	Ajd-PbFe		
Alcaparrosaite	Apr	Ancylite-(La)	Anc-La	Arrojadite-(SrFe)	Ajd-SrFe		
Aldermanite	Adm	Andalusite	And	Arsenatrotitanite	Anttn		
Aldridgeite	Adg	Andersonite	Anr	Arsenbrackebuschite	Abbs		
Aleksandrovite	Asd	Andorite IV	Ado IV	Arsendescloizite	Adcz		
Aleksite	Alk	Andorite VI	Ado VI	Arsenic	As		
Aleutite	Aeu	Andradite	Adr	Arseniopleite	Apl		
Alexkhomyakovite	Akmy	Andreadiniite	Adi	Arseniosiderite	Assd		
Alexkuznetsovite-(Ce)	Axk-Ce	Andrémeyerite	Amy	Arsenmarcobaldiite	Amcb		
Alexkuznetsovite-(La)	Axk-La	Andreyivanovite	Aiv	Arsenmedaite	Amed		
Alflarsenite	Alf	Andrianovite	Adv	Arsenoclasite	Asc		
Alforsite	Afr	Anduoite	Adu	Arsenocrandallite	Acdl		
Alfredopetrovite	Afd	Andychristyite	Acs	Arsenoflorencite-(Ce)	Aflo-Ce		
Alfredstelznerite	Asz	Andymcdonaldite	Amc	Arsenoflorencite-(La)	Aflo-La		
Algodonite	Ago	Andyrobertsite	Arb	Arsenogorceixite	Agcx		
Alicewilsonite-(YCe)	Aws-YCe	Angarfite	Agf	Arsenogoyazite	Agoy		
Alicewilsonite-(YLa)	Aws-YLa	Angastonite	Ags	Arsenohauchecornite	Ahau		
Aliettite	Ali	Ángelaite	Áge	Arsenohopeite	Ahop		
Alkali feldspar	Afs	Angelellite	Agl	Arsenolamprite	Asl		
Allabogdanite	Abg	Anglesite	Ang	Arsenolite	Aso		
Allactite	Ala	Anhydrite	Anh	Arsenopalladinite	Apdn		
Allanite-(Ce)	Aln-Ce	Anhydrokainite	Ahk	Arsenopyrite	Apy		
Allanite-(La)	Aln-La	Anilite	Ani	Arsenotučekite	Atuč		
Allanite-(Nd)	Aln-Nd	Ankerite	Ank	Arsenovanmeersscheite	Avms		
Allanite-(Y)	Aln-Y	Ankinovichite	Akv	Arsenowagnerite	Awag		

== B ==
Name	Symbol	Name	Symbol	Name	Symbol	Name	Symbol
Babánekite	Bbá	Béhierite	Béh	Bismutohauchecornite	Bhau	Brewsterite-Ba	Brw-Ba
Babefphite	Bbf	Behoite	Beh	Bismutostibiconite	Bsbc	Brewsterite-Sr	Brw-Sr
Babingtonite	Bab	Běhounekite	Bhn	Bismutotantalite	Bttl	Breyite	Byi
Babkinite	Bbk	Beidellite	Bei	Bitikleite	Bkl	Brezinaite	Bzn
Backite	Bac	Belakovskiite	Bkk	Bityite	Bty	Brianite	Bne
Badakhshanite-(Y)	Bad-Y	Belendorffite	Bdf	Bixbyite	Bxb	Brianroulstonite	Brsn
Badalovite	Bdl	Belkovite	Bkv	Bjarebyite	Bj	Brianyoungite	Byo
Baddeleyite	Bdy	Bellbergite	Blb	Blakeite	Bak	Briartite	Btt
Badengzhuite	Bdz	Bellidoite	Bld	Blatonite	Blt	Bridgesite-(Ce)	Bdg-Ce
Bafertisite	Bft	Bellingerite	Blg	Blatterite	Bla	Bridgmanite	Bdm
Baghdadite	Bgd	Belloite	Bll	Bleasdaleite	Ble	Brindleyite	Bly
Bahariyaite	Bah	Belogubite	Bgb	Blixite	Blx	Brinrobertsite	Brb
Bahianite	Bhi	Belomarinaite	Bmr	Blödite	Blö	Britholite-(Ce)	Bri-Ce
Baileychlore	Blc	Belousovite	Busv	Blossite	Blo	Britholite-(Y)	Bri-Y
Bainbridgeite-(YCe)	Bbg-(YCe)	Belovite-(Ce)	Blv-Ce	Bluebellite	Bbl	Britvinite	Bv
Bairdite	Bai	Belovite-(La)	Blv-La	Bluelizardite	Blz	Brizziite	Bzi
Bakhchisaraitsevite	Bkc	Belyankinite	Byn	Bluestreakite	Blu	Brochantite	Bct
Baksanite	Bks	Bementite	Bem	Bobcookite	Bbc	Brockite	Bck
Balangeroite	Bal	Benauite	Bnu	Bobfergusonite	Bfg	Brodtkorbite	Bdk
Balestraite	Bls	Benavidesite	Bnv	Bobfinchite	Bfc	Bromargyrite	Bag
Balićžunićite	Bžć	Bendadaite	Bdd	Bobierrite	Bob	Bromellite	Bmel
Balipholite	Blp	Benitoite	Bni	Bobjonesite	Bjon	Brontesite	Bte
Balkanite	Bkn	Benjaminite	Bnj	Bobkingite	Bkg	Brookite	Brk
Balliranoite	Blr	Benleonardite	Bln	Bobmeyerite	Bmy	Browneite	Bw
Balyakinite	Byk	Bennesherite	Bnh	Bobshannonite	Bsha	Brownleeite	Bwn
Bambollaite	Bmb	Benstonite	Ben	Bobtraillite	Bta	Brownmillerite	Bmlr
Bamfordite	Bfd	Bentorite	Bto	Bodieite	Bod	Brucite	Brc
Banalsite	Bns	Benyacarite	Byc	Bogdanovite	Bog	Brüggenite	Brü
Bandylite	Bny	Beraunite	Bru	Bøggildite	Bgg	Brugnatellite	Bug
Bannermanite	Bnm	Berborite	Bbo	Boggsite	Bgs	Brumadoite	Bmd
Bannisterite	Ban	Berdesinskiite	Bds	Bøgvadite	Bgv	Brunogeierite	Bng
Baotite	Bao	Berezanskite	Bzk	Bohdanowiczite	Boh	Brushite	Bsh
Barahonaite-(Al)	Bho-Al	Bergenite	Bgn	Böhmite	Bhm	Bubnovaite	Bub
Barahonaite-(Fe)	Bho-Fe	Bergslagite	Bgl	Bohseite	Bhs	Buchwaldite	Bwa
Bararite	Brr	Berlinite	Ber	Bohuslavite	Bhv	Buckhornite	Bhr
Baratovite	Btv	Bermanite	Brm	Bojarite	Boj	Buddingtonite	Bud
Barberiite	Bbi	Bernalite	Bnl	Bokite	Bkt	Bukovite	Bko
Barbosalite	Bsa	Bernardite	Bnd	Boleite	Bol	Bukovskýite	Buk
Barentsite	Brts	Bernarlottiite	Bl	Bolivarite	Bva	Bulachite	Buh
Bariandite	Brd	Berndtite	Bti	Boltwoodite	Bwd	Bulgakite	Bgk
Barićite	Bć	Berryite	Bry	Bonaccordite	Bna	Bultfonteinite	Bul
Barikaite	Bka	Berthierine	Brh	Bonacinaite	Bci	Bunnoite	Bno
Barioferrite	Baf	Berthierite	Btr	Bonattite	Bon	Bunsenite	Bse
Bario-olgite	Bolg	Bertossaite	Bts	Bonazziite	Bzz	Burangaite	Brg
Bario-orthojoaquinite	Bojq	Bertrandite	Btd	Bonshtedtite	Bsd	Burbankite	Bbn
Barioperovskite	Bprv	Beryl	Brl	Boothite	Boo	Burckhardtite	Bkd
Bariopharmacoalumite	Bpal	Beryllite	Byt	Boracite	Boc	Burgessite	Bge
Bariopharmacosiderite	Bpsd	Beryllonite	Bel	Boralsilite	Bor	Burkeite	Bke
Bariosincosite	Bscs	Berzelianite	Brz	Borax	Brx	Burnettite	Bnet
Barlowite	Blw	Berzeliite	Bze	Borcarite	Bcr	Burnsite	Bur
Barnesite	Bar	Beshtauite	Bes	Borisenkoite	Bsk	Burovaite-Ca	Brv-Ca
Barquillite	Bql	Betafite	Btf	Borishanskiite (discredited)	Bhk	Burpalite	Brp
Barrerite	Bre	Betalomonosovite	Blom	Bornemanite	Bma	Burroite	Burr
Barringerite	Bgr	Betekhtinite	Bkh	Bornhardtite	Bhd	Burtite	Bu
Barroisite	Brs	Betpakdalite-CaCa	Bpd-CaCa	Bornite	Bn	Buryatite	Buy
Barrotite	Bro	Betpakdalite-CaMg	Bpd-CaMg	Borocookeite	Bckt	Buseckite	Bsc
Barrydawsonite-(Y)	Bdw-Y	Betpakdalite-FeFe	Bpd-FeFe	Borodaevite	Bdv	Buserite	Bsr
Barstowite	Bsw	Betpakdalite-NaCa	Bpd-NaCa	Boromullite	Bmul	Bushmakinite	Bmk
Bartelkeite	Btk	Betpakdalite-NaNa	Bpd-NaNa	Boromuscovite	Bms	Bussenite	Bus
Bartonite	Btn	Bettertonite	Bet	Borovskite	Bvk	Bussyite-(Ce)	Bsy-Ce
Barwoodite	Bwo	Betzite	Bzt	Bortnikovite	Bnk	Bussyite-(Y)	Bsy-Y
Barylite	By	Beudantite	Bdn	Boscardinite	Bcd	Bustamite	Bst
Barysilite	Bsl	Beusite	Beu	Bosiite	Bos	Butianite	But
Baryte	Brt	Beusite-(Ca)	Beu-Ca	Bosoite	Bs	Butlerite	Btl
Barytocalcite	Bcal	Beyerite	Bey	Bostwickite	Btw	Bütschliite	Büt
Barytolamprophyllite	Blmp	Bezsmertnovite	Bez	Botallackite	Blk	Buttgenbachite	Bba
Bassanite	Bss	Biachellaite	Bcl	Botryogen	Byg	Byelorussite-(Ce)	Bye-Ce
Bassetite	Bas	Biagioniite	Bgi	Bottinoite	Bot	Bykovaite	Byv
Bassoite	Bso	Bianchiniite	Bcn	Botuobinskite	Btb	Byrudite	Byd
Bastnäsite-(Ce)	Bsn-Ce	Bianchite	Bnc	Bouazzerite	Boz	Bystrite	Bys
Bastnäsite-(La)	Bsn-La	Bicapite	Bic	Boulangerite	Bou	Byströmite	Bym
Bastnäsite-(Nd)	Bsn-Nd	Bicchulite	Bch	Bournonite	Bnn	Bytízite	Btz
Bastnäsite-(Y)	Bsn-Y	Bideauxite	Bdx	Bouškaite	Bok	Byzantievite	Byz
Batagayite	Btg	Bieberite	Bie	Boussingaultite	Bsg		
Batievaite-(Y)	Bvt-Y	Biehlite	Bhl	Bowieite	Bow		
Batiferrite	Bfe	Bigcreekite	Big	Bowlesite	Bwl		
Batisite	Bat	Bijvoetite-(Y)	Bij-Y	Boyleite	Boy		
Batisivite	Bsv	Bikitaite	Bik	Braccoite	Bcc		
Baumhauerite	Bha	Bilibinskite	Bb	Bracewellite	Bwe		
Baumhauerite II	Bha II	Bílinite	Bli	Brackebuschite	Bbs		
Baumoite	Bam	Billietite	Bil	Bradaczekite	Bdc		
Baumstarkite	Bum	Billingsleyite	Bgy	Bradleyite	Bd		
Bauranoite	Bau	Billwiseite	Bwi	Braggite	Bg		
Bavenite	Bvn	Bimbowrieite	Bbw	Braithwaiteite	Bwt		
Bavsiite	Bav	Bindheimite	Bhe	Braitschite-(Ce)	Btc-Ce		
Bayerite	Byr	Biotite	Bt	Brammallite	Bml		
Bayldonite	Bay	Biphosphammite	Bpam	Branchite	Bran		
Bayleyite	Byy	Biraite-(Ce)	Bia-Ce	Brandãoite	Bdã		
Baylissite	Byl	Biraite-(La)	Bia-La	Brandholzite	Bdh		
Bazhenovite	Baz	Birchite	Bc	Brandtite	Bdt		
Bazirite	Bzr	Biringuccite	Bgc	Brannerite	Bnr		
Bazzite	Bz	Birnessite	Bir	Brannockite	Bra		
Bearsite	Bea	Birunite	Brn	Brassite	Bsi		
Bearthite	Bth	Bischofite	Bsf	Brattforsite	Bf		
Beaverite-(Cu)	Bvr-Cu	Bismite	Bis	Braunerite	Bun		
Beaverite-(Zn)	Bvr-Zn	Bismoclite	Bmc	Braunite	Bnt		
Bechererite	Bec	Bismuth	Bi	Brazilianite	Bzl		
Beckettite	Bek	Bismuthinite	Bin	Bredigite	Bdi		
Becquerelite	Bqr	Bismutite	Bit	Breithauptite	Bhp		
Bederite	Bdr	Bismutocolumbite	Bclb	Brendelite	Bde		
Beershevaite	Bee	Bismutoferrite	Bif	Brenkite	Bki		

== C ==
Name	Symbol	Name	Symbol	Name	Symbol	Name	Symbol	Name	Symbol
Cabalzarite	Clz	Carnallite	Cna	Chenguodaite	Cgu	Clinoamphibole	Cam	Coyoteite	Coy
Cabriite	Cbr	Carnotite	Cnt	Chenite	Che	Clinoatacamite	Cata	Crandallite	Cdl
Cabvinite	Cbv	Carobbiite	Crb	Chenmingite	Cnm	Clinobehoite	Cbht	Cranswickite	Cwk
Cacoxenite	Cac	Carpathite	Cpa	Cheralite	Cher	Clinobisvanite	Cbi	Crawfordite	Cfd
Cadmium	Cd	Carpholite	Car	Cheremnykhite	Cny	Clinocervantite	Ccvn	Creaseyite	Cse
Cadmoindite	Cad	Carraraite	Cra	Cherepanovite	Cpv	Clinochlore	Clc	Crednerite	Cnr
Cadmoselite	Cds	Carrboydite	Cby	Chernikovite	Ckv	Clinoclase	Cno	Creedite	Cee
Cadwaladerite	Cwd	Carrollite	Cli	Chernovite-(Y)	Chv-Y	Clinoenstatite	Cen	Crerarite	Cea
Caesiumpharmacosiderite	Cpsd	Caryinite	Cyn	Chernykhite	Cyk	Clino-ferri-holmquistite	Cfhlm	Crichtonite	Cic
Cafarsite	Caf	Caryochroite	Cyh	Chervetite	Crv	Clino-ferro-ferri-holmquistite	Cffhlm	Criddleite	Cdd
Cafetite	Cft	Caryopilite	Cpl	Chesnokovite	Ck	Clinoferrosilite	Cfs	Crimsonite	Cms
Cahnite	Cah	Cascandite	Cas	Chessexite	Cex	Clinohedrite	Cnh	Cristobalite	Crs
Cairncrossite	Ccs	Caseyite	Csy	Chesterite	Chs	Clinohumite	Chu	Crocobelonite	Ccb
Calamaite	Clm	Cassagnaite	Csg	Chestermanite	Csm	Clinojimthompsonite	Cjim	Crocoite	Crc
Calaverite	Clv	Cassedanneite	Cda	Chevkinite-(Ce)	Cvk-Ce	Clinokurchatovite	Ckht	Cronstedtite	Cro
Calciborite	Cbo	Cassidyite	Cdy	Chiappinoite-(Y)	Cap-Y	Clinometaborite	Cmbo	Cronusite	Cnu
Calcinaksite	Cnk	Cassiterite	Cst	Chiavennite	Cve	Clino-oscarkempffite	Cokp	Crookesite	Crk
Calcioancylite-(Ce)	Canc-Ce	Castellaroite	Ctr	Chibaite	Cib	Clinophosinaite	Cpsi	Crowningshieldite	Csh
Calcioancylite-(Nd)	Canc-Nd	Caswellsilverite	Cws	Chihuahuaite	Cih	Clinoptilolite-Ca	Cpt-Ca	Cryobostryxite	Cbx
Calcioandyrobertsite	Carb	Catalanoite	Ct	Childrenite	Chd	Clinoptilolite-K	Cpt-K	Cryolite	Crl
Calcioaravaipaite	Cavp	Catamarcaite	Ctm	Chiluite	Cil	Clinoptilolite-Na	Cpt-Na	Cryolithionite	Cyln
Calcioburbankite	Cbbn	Catapleiite	Ctp	Chinchorroite	Cch	Clinopyroxene	Cpx	Cryptochalcite	Cpch
Calciocatapleiite	Cctp	Cattierite	Cat	Chinleite-(Y)	Chi-Y	Clinosafflorite	Csaf	Cryptohalite	Cphl
Calciocopiapite	Ccpi	Cattiite	Ctt	Chiolite	Cio	Clino-suenoite	Csue	Cryptomelane	Cml
Calciodelrioite	Cdlr	Cavansite	Cav	Chirvinskyite	Cvs	Clinotobermorite	Ctbm	Cryptophyllite	Cp
Calcioferrite	Cfr	Cavoite	Cvo	Chistyakovaite	Cak	Clinoungemachite	Cug	Cualstibite	Casb
Calciohatertite	Chtt	Cayalsite-(Y)	Cyl-Y	Chivruaiite	Cvr	Clinozoisite	Czo	Cuatrocapaite-(K)	Ctc-K
Calciohilairite	Chlr	Caysichite-(Y)	Cay-Y	Chiyokoite	Cyo	Clintonite	Cln	Cuatrocapaite-(NH4)	Ctc-NH4
Calciojohillerite	Cjhl	Cebaite-(Ce)	Ceb-Ce	Chkalovite	Ckl	Cloncurryite	Ccu	Cubanite	Cbn
Calciolangbeinite	Clgb	Cebollite	Cbl	Chladniite	Clad	Coalingite	Clg	Cuboargyrite	Cbag
Calciomurmanite	Cmmn	Čechite	Čec	Chloraluminite	Cla	Cobaltarthurite	Caru	Cumengeite	Cge
Calcio-olivine	Caol	Čejkaite	Čej	Chlorapatite	Clap	Cobaltaustinite	Caus	Cummingtonite	Cum
Calciopetersite	Cpts	Celadonite	Cel	Chlorargyrite	Cag	Cobaltite	Cbt	Cupalite	Cup
Calciosamarskite	Csmk	Celestine	Clt	Chlorartinite	Cart	Cobaltkieserite	Cksr	Cuprite	Cpr
Calciotantite	Ctan	Celleriite	Cll	Chlorbartonite	Cbtn	Cobaltkoritnigite	Ckor	Cuproauride	Cua
Calciouranoite	Cun	Celsian	Cls	Chlorellestadite	Clel	Cobaltlotharmeyerite	Clmy	Cuprobismutite	Cbit
Calcioursilite	Caur	Centennialite	Cte	Chlorite	Chl	Cobaltneustädtelite	Cneu	Cuprocopiapite	Cucpi
Calcioveatchite	Cvea	Cerchiaraite-(Al)	Ccr-Al	Chloritoid	Cld	Cobaltoblödite	Cblö	Cuproiridsite	Cir
Calcite	Cal	Cerchiaraite-(Fe)	Ccr-Fe	Chlorkyuygenite	Cky	Cobaltomenite	Cbm	Cuprokalininite	Ckal
Calcjarlite	Cjar	Cerchiaraite-(Mn)	Ccr-Mn	Chlormagaluminite	Cma	Cobaltpentlandite	Copn	Cupromakopavonite	Cmpav
Calclacite	Calc	Cerianite-(Ce)	Cei-Ce	Chlormanganokalite	Cmk	Cobalttsumcorite	Ctsm	Cupromakovickyite	Cmak
Calcurmolite	Cau	Cerite-(Ce)	Crt-Ce	Chlormayenite	Cmy	Cobaltzippeite	Czip	Cupromolybdite	Cmyb
Calcybeborosilite-(Y)	Cbbs-Y	Cerium	Ce	Chlorocalcite	Ccal	Coccinite	Cci	Cuproneyite	Cney
Calderite	Cdr	Černýite	Čný	Chloromagnesite	Cmgs	Cochromite	Cchr	Cupropavonite	Cpav
Calderónite	Cdn	Cerromojonite	Cmj	Chloromenite	Cmn	Coconinoite	Coc	Cupropearceite	Cpea
Caledonite	Cdo	Ceruleite	Cru	Chlorophoenicite	Cpo	Coesite	Coe	Cupropolybasite	Cplb
Calkinsite-(Ce)	Clk-Ce	Cerussite	Cer	Chlorothionite	Ctn	Coffinite	Cof	Cuprorhodsite	Crh
Callaghanite	Cgh	Cervandonite-(Ce)	Cvd-Ce	Chloroxiphite	Cxp	Cohenite	Coh	Cuprorivaite	Cuv
Calomel	Clo	Cervantite	Cvn	Choloalite	Cho	Coiraite	Coi	Cuprosklodowskite	Cskl
Calumetite	Clu	Cervelleite	Cvl	Chondrodite	Chn	Coldwellite	Cwl	Cuprospinel	Cspl
Calvertite	Cvt	Cesanite	Csa	Chongite	Cng	Colemanite	Cole	Cuprostibite	Cusb
Calzirtite	Caz	Césarferreiraite	Céf	Chopinite	Cpn	Colimaite	Com	Cuprotungstite	Ctgs
Camanchacaite	Ccc	Cesàrolite	Csà	Chovanite	Cov	Colinowensite	Cwn	Curetonite	Cut
Cámaraite	Cám	Cesbronite	Ces	Chrisstanleyite	Csl	Collinsite	Coll	Curienite	Cue
Camaronesite	Cmr	Cesiodymite	Ced	Christelite	Cis	Coloradoite	Clr	Curite	Cui
Camérolaite	Cmé	Cesiokenopyrochlore	Ckpcl	Christite	Cri	Colquiriite	Cqr	Currierite	Cur
Cameronite	Cme	Cesplumtantite	Cptan	Christofschäferite-(Ce)	Csf-Ce	Columbite-(Fe)	Clb-Fe	Cuspidine	Csp
Camgasite	Cmg	Cetineite	Cet	Chromatite	Crm	Columbite-(Mg)	Clb-Mg	Cuyaite	Cuy
Caminite	Cmi	Chabazite-Ca	Cbz-Ca	Chrombismite	Cbis	Columbite-(Mn)	Clb-Mn	Cuzticite	Cuz
Campigliaite	Cpg	Chabazite-K	Cbz-K	Chromceladonite	Ccel	Colusite	Col	Cyanochroite	Cyc
Campostriniite	Cps	Chabazite-Mg	Cbz-Mg	Chromferide	Cfe	Comancheite	Cmc	Cyanotrichite	Cya
Canaphite	Cnp	Chabazite-Na	Cbz-Na	Chromio-pargasite	Cprg	Combeite	Cbe	Cylindrite	Cy
Canasite	Cns	Chabazite-Sr	Cbz-Sr	Chromite	Chr	Comblainite	Cob	Cymrite	Cym
Canavesite	Cnv	Chabournéite	Chb	Chromium	Cr	Compreignacite	Cgn	Cyprine	Cyp
Cancrinite	Ccn	Chadwickite	Cdw	Chromium-dravite	Cdrv	Congolite	Cgl	Cyrilovite	Cyr
Cancrisilite	Cnc	Chaidamuite	Cdm	Chromo-alumino-povondraite	Capov	Conichalcite	Con	Czochralskiite	Cz
Canfieldite	Cfi	Chalcanthite	Cct	Chromphyllite	Crp	Connellite	Cnl		
Cannizzarite	Cnz	Chalcoalumite	Cca	Chromschieffelinite	Csfl	Cookeite	Ckt		
Cannonite	Cnn	Chalcocite	Cc	Chrysoberyl	Cbrl	Coombsite	Cmb		
Canosioite	Cso	Chalcocyanite	Ccy	Chrysocolla	Ccl	Cooperite	Cpe		
Canutite	Can	Chalcomenite	Ccm	Chrysothallite	Cry	Coparsite	Cop		
Caoxite	Cao	Chalconatronite	Chna	Chrysotile	Ctl	Copiapite	Cpi		
Capgaronnite	Cga	Chalcophanite	Cph	Chubarovite	Cub	Copper (Cuprum)	Cu		
Cappelenite-(Y)	Cpp-Y	Chalcophyllite	Chp	Chudobaite	Cdb	Coquandite	Cqd		
Capranicaite	Cpc	Chalcopyrite	Ccp	Chukanovite	Ckn	Coquimbite	Coq		
Caracolite	Cco	Chalcosiderite	Csd	Chukhrovite-(Ca)	Chk-Ca	Coralloite	Crll		
Carboborite	Cab	Chalcostibite	Ccsb	Chukhrovite-(Ce)	Chk-Ce	Corderoite	Cde		
Carbobystrite	Cbys	Chalcothallite	Ccth	Chukhrovite-(Nd)	Chk-Nd	Cordierite	Crd		
Carbocernaite	Cbc	Challacolloite	Chc	Chukhrovite-(Y)	Chk-Y	Cordylite-(Ce)	Cod-Ce		
Carboirite	Cb	Chambersite	Cbs	Chukochenite	Ckc	Cordylite-(La)	Cod-La		
Carbokentbrooksite	Cktb	Chaméanite	Céa	Chukotkaite	Ckk	Corkite	Cok		
Carbonatecyanotrichite	Ccya	Chamosite	Chm	Churchite-(Y)	Cuh-Y	Cornetite	Cne		
Cardite	Cdi	Chanabayaite	Cba	Chursinite	Csi	Cornubite	Cnb		
Carducciite	Cdu	Changbaiite	Chg	Chvaleticeite	Cva	Cornwallite	Cnw		
Caresite	Cre	Changchengite	Ccg	Chvilevaite	Cvi	Coronadite	Cor		
Carletonite	Cto	Changoite	Cgo	Cianciulliite	Cia	Correianevesite	Corr		
Carletonmooreite	Cmo	Chantalite	Cht	Cinnabar	Cin	Corrensite	Crr		
Carlfrancisite	Cfc	Chaoite	Ch	Ciprianiite	Cip	Cortesognoite	Ctg		
Carlfriesite	Clf	Chapmanite	Cpm	Ciriottiite	Cit	Corundum	Crn		
Carlgieseckeite-(Nd)	Csk-Nd	Charleshatchettite	Chh	Cirrolite	Ci	Corvusite	Cvu		
Carlhintzeite	Chz	Charlesite	Chrl	Clairite	Clai	Cosalite	Cos		
Carlinite	Cni	Charmarite	Char	Claraite	Clar	Coskrenite-(Ce)	Ckr-Ce		
Carlosbarbosaite	Cbb	Charoite	Cha	Claringbullite	Cgb	Cossaite	Css		
Carlosruizite	Crz	Chatkalite	Ctk	Clarkeite	Cke	Costibite	Csb		
Carlosturanite	Csr	Chayesite	Cys	Claudetite	Cdt	Cotunnite	Cot		
Carlsbergite	Cbg	Chegemite	Cgm	Clausthalite	Cth	Coulsonite	Cou		
Carlsonite	Csn	Chekhovichite	Ckh	Clearcreekite	Cck	Cousinite	Cus		
Carmeltazite	Ctz	Chelkarite	Cka	Clerite	Cle	Coutinhoite	Cti		
Carmichaelite	Cmh	Chenevixite	Cvx	Cleusonite	Ceu	Covellite	Cv		
Carminite	Cmt	Chengdeite	Cgd	Cliffordite	Cff	Cowlesite	Cow		

== D ==
Name	Symbol	Name	Symbol	Name	Symbol	Name	Symbol
Dachiardite-Ca	Dac-Ca	Delhuyarite-(Ce)	Dhu-Ce	Diopside	Di	Dualite	Dua
Dachiardite-K	Dac-K	Deliensite	Dli	Dioptase	Dpt	Dufrénite	Dfr
Dachiardite-Na	Dac-Na	Delindeite	Dde	Dioskouriite	Dio	Dufrénoysite	Duf
Dadsonite	Dad	Dellagiustaite	Dgt	Direnzoite	Drz	Duftite	Dft
Dagenaisite	Dag	Dellaite	Dll	Dissakisite-(Ce)	Dis-Ce	Dugganite	Dug
Daliranite	Da	Deloneite	Dln	Dissakisite-(La)	Dis-La	Dukeite	Duk
Dalnegorskite	Dng	Deloryite	Dlo	Disulfodadsonite	Ddad	Dumontite	Dmt
Dalnegroite	Dnr	Delrioite	Dl	Dittmarite	Dmr	Dumortierite	Dum
Dalyite	Dly	Deltalumite	Dal	Diversilite-(Ce)	Dvs-Ce	Dundasite	Dun
Damaraite	Dm	Delvauxite	Dvx	Dixenite	Dxn	Durangite	Dur
Damiaoite	Dam	Demagistrisite	Dmg	Djerfisherite	Djr	Duranusite	Du
Danalite	Dan	Demartinite	Dma	Djurleite	Dju	Dusmatovite	Dus
Danbaite	Dba	Demesmaekerite	Dmm	Dmisokolovite	Dsk	Dussertite	Dst
Danburite	Dbu	Demicheleite-(Br)	Dem-Br	Dmisteinbergite	Dsb	Dutkevichite-(Ce)	Dut-Ce
Danielsite	Dns	Demicheleite-(Cl)	Dem-Cl	Dmitryivanovite	Div	Dutrowite	Dtw
D'ansite	D'an	Demicheleite-(I)	Dem-I	Dobrovolskyite	Dvo	Duttonite	Dtn
D'ansite-(Fe)	D'an-Fe	Dendorraite-(NH4)	Den-NH4	Dobšináite	Dob	Dwornikite	Dwo
D'ansite-(Mn)	D'an-Mn	Denisovite	Dnv	Dokuchaevite	Dok	Dymkovite	Dym
Dantopaite	Dnt	Denningite	Dnn	Dolerophanite	Dph	Dypingite	Dyp
Daomanite	Dao	Depmeierite	Dep	Dollaseite-(Ce)	Dls-Ce	Dyrnaesite-(La)	Dyr-La
Daqingshanite-(Ce)	Daq-Ce	Derbylite	Dby	Dolomite	Dol	Dyscrasite	Dys
Darapiosite	Dar	Derriksite	Drk	Doloresite	Dlr	Dzhalindite	Dz
Darapskite	Drp	Dervillite	Dvl	Domerockite	Dom	Dzharkenite	Dzh
Dargaite	Drg	Desautelsite	Des	Domeykite	Do	Dzhuluite	Dzl
Darrellhenryite	Dhry	Descloizite	Dcz	Domeykite-β	Do-β	Dzierżanowskite	Dża
Dashkovaite	Dkv	Despujolsite	Dpj	Donbassite	Dbs		
Datolite	Dat	Dessauite-(Y)	Dss-Y	Dondoellite	Ddl		
Daubréeite	Dau	Destinezite	Dtz	Donharrisite	Dhr		
Daubréelite	Dbr	Deveroite-(Ce)	Dvr-Ce	Donnayite-(Y)	Dna-Y		
Davanite	Dvn	Devilliersite	Dvi	Donowensite	Dnw		
Davemaoite	Dvm	Devilline	Dev	Donpeacorite	Don		
Davidbrownite-(NH4)	Dbn-NH4	Devitoite	Dvt	Donwilhelmsite	Dwh		
Davidite-(Ce)	Dvd-Ce	Dewindtite	Dew	Dorallcharite	Drc		
Davidite-(La)	Dvd-La	Diaboleite	Dbol	Dorfmanite	Dfm		
Davidlloydite	Dld	Diadochite	Ddc	Dorrite	Dor		
Davidsmithite	Dsm	Diamond	Dia	Douglasite	Dgl		
Davinciite	Dvc	Diaoyudaoite	Dyd	Dovyrenite	Dov		
Davisite	Dav	Diaphorite	Dpr	Downeyite	Dny		
Davreuxite	Drx	Diaspore	Dsp	Doyleite	Doy		
Davyne	Dvy	Dickinsonite-(KMnNa)	Dcn-KMnNa	Dozyite	Doz		
Dawsonite	Dws	Dickite	Dck	Dravertite	Dra		
Deanesmithite	Dsh	Dickthomssenite	Dth	Dravite	Drv		
Debattistiite	Dbt	Diegogattaite	Dga	Drechslerite	Dre		
Decagonite	Dec	Dienerite	Dne	Dresserite	Dsr		
Decrespignyite-(Y)	Dcp-Y	Dietrichite	Dtr	Dreyerite	Dye		
Deerite	Dee	Dietzeite	Die	Dritsite	Drt		
Defernite	Def	Digenite	Dg	Drobecite	Dro		
Dekatriasartorite	Dsat	Dimorphite	Dim	Droninoite	Dr		
Delafossite	Del	Dingdaohengite-(Ce)	Ddh-Ce	Drugmanite	Dru		
Delhayelite	Dhy	Dinite	Din	Drysdallite	Dry		

== E ==
Name	Symbol	Name	Symbol	Name	Symbol	Name	Symbol	Name	Symbol	Name	Symbol
Eakerite	Ea	Eglestonite	Egl	Elpidite	Epd	Ercitite	Erc	Escheite	Esc	Eveite	Ev
Earlandite	Ear	Ehrleite	Ehr	Eltyubyuite	Elt	Erdite	Erd	Esdanaite-(Ce)	Edn-Ce	Evenkite	Evk
Earlshannonite	Esn	Eifelite	Eif	Elyite	Ely	Ericaite	Eic	Eskebornite	Ebn	Eveslogite	Evl
Eastonite	Eas	Eirikite	Eir	Embreyite	Emb	Ericlaxmanite	Elx	Eskimoite	Ekm	Evseevite	Evs
Ecandrewsite	Ec	Eitelite	Eit	Emeleusite	Eme	Ericssonite	Ers	Eskolaite	Esk	Ewaldite	Ew
Ecdemite	Ecd	Ekanite	Ek	Emilite	Emi	Erikapohlite	Erk	Espadaite	Esp	Ewingite	Ewg
Eckerite	Ekr	Ekaterinite	Eka	Emmerichite	Emr	Erikjonssonite	Ejs	Esperanzaite	Epz	Eylettersite	Eyl
Eckermannite	Eck	Ekatite	Ekt	Emmonsite	Ems	Eringaite	Erg	Esperite	Epr	Eyselite	Eys
Eckhardite	Ehd	Ekebergite	Ekb	Emplectite	Emp	Eriochalcite	Ech	Esquireite	Esq	Ezcurrite	Ezc
Eclarite	Ecl	Ekplexite	Ekp	Empressite	Eps	Erionite-Ca	Eri-Ca	Esseneite	Ess	Eztlite	Ez
Écrinsite	Écr	Elasmochloite	Ela	Enargite	Eng	Erionite-K	Eri-K	Ettringite	Ett		
Eddavidite	Edv	Elbaite	Elb	Engelhauptite	Egh	Erionite-Na	Eri-Na	Eucairite	Eca		
Edenharterite	Eht	Elbrusite	Ebs	Englishite	Egs	Erlianite	Ern	Euchlorine	Ecr		
Edenite	Ed	Eldfellite	Edf	Enneasartorite	Esat	Erlichmanite	Erl	Euchroite	Euc		
Edgarbaileyite	Ebl	Eldragónite	Eld	Enstatite	En	Ermakovite	Ekv	Euclase	Ecs		
Edgarite	Edg	Eleomelanite	Elm	Eosphorite	Eos	Ernienickelite	Enk	Eucryptite	Ecp		
Edgrewite	Egr	Eleonorite (discredited)	Eln	Ephesite	Eph	Erniggliite	Eni	Eudialyte	Eud		
Edingtonite	Edi	Elgoresyite	Ego	Epididymite	Edd	Ernstburkeite	Ebu	Eudidymite	Edy		
Edoylerite	Eoy	Eliopoulosite	Epo	Epidote	Ep	Ernstite	Ens	Eugenite	Eug		
Edscottite	Est	Eliseevite	Esv	Epidote-(Sr)	Ep-Sr	Ershovite	Esh	Eugsterite	Egt		
Edtollite	Edt	Ellenbergerite	Ell	Epifanovite	Efv	Erssonite	Eso	Eulytine	Eul		
Edwardsite	Edw	Ellinaite	El	Epistilbite	Estb	Ertixiite	Ert	Eurekadumpite	Eur		
Effenbergerite	Efb	Ellingsenite	Elg	Epistolite	Epi	Erythrite	Ery	Euxenite-(Y)	Eux-Y		
Efremovite	Efr	Ellisite	Els	Epsomite	Esm	Erythrosiderite	Esd	Evansite	Evn		
Eggletonite	Egg	Elpasolite	Elp	Erazoite	Erz	Erzwiesite	Ezw	Evdokimovite	Evd		

== F ==
Name	Symbol	Name	Symbol	Name	Symbol	Name	Symbol
Fabianite	Fbn	Ferro-anthophyllite	Fath	Fluocerite-(Ce)	Fcrt-Ce	Friedelite	Fdl
Fabrièsite	Fab	Ferrobobfergusonite	Fbfg	Fluocerite-(La)	Fcrt-La	Friedrichbeckeite	Fri
Faheyite	Fah	Ferrobustamite	Fbst	Fluorannite	Fann	Friedrichite	Frd
Fahleite	Fhl	Ferrocarpholite	Fcar	Fluorapatite	Fap	Fritzscheite	Fzs
Fairbankite	Fbk	Ferroceladonite	Fcel	Fluorapophyllite-(Cs)	Fapo-Cs	Frohbergite	Frb
Fairchildite	Fch	Ferrochiavennite	Fcve	Fluorapophyllite-(K)	Fapo-K	Frolovite	Flv
Fairfieldite	Ffd	Ferro-edenite	Fed	Fluorapophyllite-(Na)	Fapo-Na	Frondelite	Fnd
Faizievite	Fai	Ferroefremovite	Fefr	Fluorapophyllite-(NH4)	Fapo-NH4	Froodite	Fro
Falcondoite	Fcd	Ferroericssonite	Fers	Fluorarrojadite-(BaFe)	Fajd-BaFe	Fuenzalidaite	Fzl
Falgarite	Fal	Ferro-ferri-fluoro-leakeite	Fffllk	Fluorarrojadite-(BaNa)	Fajd-BaNa	Fuettererite	Fue
Falkmanite	Fmn	Ferro-ferri-hornblende	Ffhbl	Fluorbarytolamprophyllite	Fblmp	Fukalite	Fk
Falottaite	Flt	Ferro-ferri-katophorite	Ffktp	Fluorbritholite-(Ce)	Fbri-Ce	Fukuchilite	Fuk
Falsterite	Fls	Ferro-ferri-nybøite	Ffnyb	Fluorbritholite-(Y)	Fbri-Y	Fulbrightite	Fbg
Famatinite	Fam	Ferro-ferri-obertiite	Ffob	Fluor-buergerite	Fbu	Fülöppite	Fül
Fanfaniite	Ffa	Ferro-ferri-pedrizite	Ffpd	Fluorcalciobritholite	Fcbri	Furongite	Frg
Fangite	Fg	Ferro-fluoro-edenite	Ffed	Fluorcalciomicrolite	Fcmic	Furutobeite	Fur
Fantappièite	Ftp	Ferro-fluoro-pedrizite	Fflpd	Fluorcalciopyrochlore	Fcpcl		
Farneseite	Far	Ferro-gedrite	Fged	Fluorcalcioroméite	Fcrm		
Farringtonite	Frt	Ferro-glaucophane	Fgln	Fluorcanasite	Fcns		
Fassinaite	Fas	Ferrohexahydrite	Fhhy	Fluorcaphite	Fcp		
Faujasite-Ca	Fau-Ca	Ferrohögbomite-2N2S	Fhög-2N2S	Fluorcarletonite	Fcto		
Faujasite-Mg	Fau-Mg	Ferro-holmquistite	Fhlm	Fluorcarmoite-(BaNa)	Fcm-BaNa		
Faujasite-Na	Fau-Na	Ferro-hornblende	Fhbl	Fluorchegemite	Fcgm		
Faustite	Fst	Ferroindialite	Find	Fluor-dravite	Fdrv		
Favreauite	Fav	Ferro-katophorite	Foktp	Fluor-elbaite	Felb		
Fayalite	Fa	Ferrokentbrooksite	Fktb	Fluorellestadite	Fel		
Fedorite	Fdr	Ferrokësterite	Fkës	Fluorite	Flr		
Fedorovskite	Fdo	Ferrokinoshitalite	Fkns	Fluorkyuygenite	Fky		
Fedotovite	Fdt	Ferrolaueite	Flae	Fluorlamprophyllite	Flmp		
Fehrite	Feh	Ferromerrillite	Fmer	Fluor-liddicoatite	Fld		
Feiite	Fei	Ferronickelplatinum	Fnpt	Fluorluanshiweiite	Flw		
Feinglosite	Fgl	Ferronigerite-2N1S	Fng-2N1S	Fluormayenite	Fmy		
Feitknechtite	Fkn	Ferronigerite-6N6S	Fng-6N6S	Fluornatrocoulsellite	Fnc		
Feklichevite	Fek	Ferronordite-(Ce)	Fnor-Ce	Fluornatromicrolite	Fnmic		
Felbertalite	Fbt	Ferronordite-(La)	Fnor-La	Fluornatropyrochlore	Fnpcl		
Felsőbányaite	Fsb	Ferro-papikeite	Fpa	Fluoro-cannilloite	Fca		
Feldspar	Fsp	Ferro-pargasite	Fprg	Fluorocronite	Flc		
Fenaksite	Fnk	Ferro-pedrizite	Fopd	Fluoro-edenite	Fled		
Fencooperite	Fco	Ferrorhodonite	Frdn	Fluorokinoshitalite	Flkns		
Fengchengite	Fcg	Ferro-richterite	Frct	Fluoro-leakeite	Fllk		
Feodosiyite	Fdy	Ferrorockbridgeite	Forck	Fluoro-nybøite	Fnyb		
Ferberite	Feb	Ferrorosemaryite	Frmy	Fluoro-pargasite	Flprg		
Ferchromide	Fcr	Ferrosaponite	Fsap	Fluoro-pedrizite	Flpd		
Ferdowsiite	Fdw	Ferroselite	Fse	Fluorophlogopite	Fphl		
Fergusonite-(Ce)	Fgs-Ce	Ferrosilite	Fs	Fluoro-richterite	Flrct		
Fergusonite-(Ce)-β	Fgs-Ce-β	Ferroskutterudite	Fskt	Fluoro-riebeckite	Frbk		
Fergusonite-(Nd)-β	Fgs-Nd-β	Ferrostalderite	Fstd	Fluoro-taramite	Fltrm		
Fergusonite-(Y)	Fgs-Y	Ferrostrunzite	Fostz	Fluorotetraferriphlogopite	Ftfphl		
Fergusonite-(Y)-β	Fgs-Y-β	Ferrotaaffeite-2N'2S	Ftf-2N'2S	Fluoro-tremolite	Ftr		
Ferhodsite	Frh	Ferrotaaffeite-6N'3S	Ftf-6N'3S	Fluorowardite	Fwd		
Fermiite	Fmi	Ferro-taramite	Ftrm	Fluorphosphohedyphane	Fphdy		
Fernandinite	Frn	Ferrotitanowodginite	Ftwdg	Fluor-schorl	Fsrl		
Feroxyhyte	Fox	Ferrotochilinite	Ftch	Fluorstrophite	Fstr		
Ferraioloite	Frl	Ferro-tschermakite	Fts	Fluor-tsilaisite	Ftl		
Ferrarisite	Fer	Ferrotychite	Ftyc	Fluor-uvite	Fluvt		
Ferriakasakaite-(Ce)	Fak-Ce	Ferrovalleriite	Fval	Fluorvesuvianite	Fves		
Ferriakasakaite-(La)	Fak-La	Ferrovorontsovite	Fvor	Fluorwavellite	Fwav		
Ferriallanite-(Ce)	Faln-Ce	Ferrowodginite	Fwdg	Flurlite	Flu		
Ferriallanite-(La)	Faln-La	Ferrowyllieite	Fwyl	Foggite	Fgg		
Ferriandrosite-(La)	Fea-La	Ferruccite	Fru	Fogoite-(Y)	Fog-Y		
Ferribushmakinite	Fbmk	Fersmanite	Fsn	Foitite	Foi		
Ferricerite-(La)	Fecrt-La	Fersmite	Fsm	Folvikite	Fvk		
Ferricopiapite	Fcpi	Feruvite	Fuvt	Fontanite	Ftn		
Ferricoronadite	Fcor	Fervanite	Fvn	Fontarnauite	Fon		
Ferrierite-K	Frr-K	Fetiasite	Fet	Foordite	Foo		
Ferrierite-Mg	Frr-Mg	Fettelite	Ftt	Footemineite	Ftm		
Ferrierite-Na	Frr-Na	Feynmanite	Fey	Forêtite	Frê		
Ferrierite-NH4	Frr-NH4	Fianelite	Fnl	Formanite-(Y)	Frm-Y		
Ferri-fluoro-katophorite	Fflktp	Fibroferrite	Ffr	Formicaite	Fmc		
Ferri-fluoro-leakeite	Ffllk	Fichtelite	Fic	Fornacite	For		
Ferri-ghoseite	Fgh	Fiedlerite	Fie	Forsterite	Fo		
Ferri-hellandite-(Ce)	Fhld-Ce	Fiemmeite	Fmm	Foshagite	Fos		
Ferrihollandite	Fhol	Filatovite	Ftv	Fougèrite	Fgè		
Ferrihydrite	Fhy	Filipstadite	Fps	Fourmarierite	Fmr		
Ferri-kaersutite	Fkrs	Fillowite	Fil	Fowlerite	Fwl		
Ferri-katophorite	Fktp	Finchite	Fin	Fraipontite	Fpt		
Ferri-leakeite	Flk	Fingerite	Fgr	Francevillite	Fvl		
Ferrilotharmeyerite	Flmy	Finnemanite	Fnn	Franciscanite	Fcc		
Ferrimolybdite	Fmyb	Fischesserite	Fis	Francisite	Fcs		
Ferri-mottanaite-(Ce)	Fmot-Ce	Fivegite	Fiv	Franckeite	Fke		
Ferrinatrite	Fnat	Fizélyite	Fiz	Francoanellite	Fan		
Ferri-obertiite	Fob	Flaggite	Flg	Françoisite-(Ce)	Frç-Ce		
Ferri-pedrizite	Fpd	Flagstaffite	Fsf	Françoisite-(Nd)	Frç-Nd		
Ferriperbøeite-(Ce)	Fpbø-Ce	Flamite	Fmt	Franconite	Fra		
Ferriperbøeite-(La)	Fpbø-La	Fleetite	Fle	Frankamenite	Fkm		
Ferriprehnite	Fprh	Fleischerite	Fsh	Frankdicksonite	Fds		
Ferripyrophyllite	Fprl	Fleisstalite	Fss	Frankhawthorneite	Fht		
Ferrirockbridgeite	Frck	Fletcherite	Ftc	Franklinfurnaceite	Fkf		
Ferrisanidine	Fsa	Flinkite	Fln	Franklinite	Frk		
Ferrisepiolite	Fsep	Flinteite	Fnt	Franklinphilite	Fkp		
Ferrisicklerite	Fsik	Florencite-(Ce)	Flo-Ce	Fransoletite	Fsl		
Ferristrunzite	Fstz	Florencite-(La)	Flo-La	Franzinite	Frz		
Ferrisurite	Fsur	Florencite-(Nd)	Flo-Nd	Freboldite	Fbd		
Ferrisymplesite	Fsym	Florencite-(Sm)	Flo-Sm	Fredrikssonite	Fdk		
Ferri-taramite	Fi-trm	Florenskyite	Fsk	Freedite	Fre		
Ferrivauxite	Fvx	Florensovite	Frs	Freibergite	Fb		
Ferri-winchite	Fwnc	Flörkeite	Flö	Freieslebenite	Flb		
Ferro-actinolite	Fact	Fluckite	Fck	Freitalite	Fta		
Ferroalluaudite	Fald	Fluellite	Fll	Fresnoite	Fno		
Ferroaluminoceladonite	Facel	Fluoborite	Fbo	Freudenbergite	Fdb		

== G ==
Name	Symbol	Name	Symbol	Name	Symbol	Name	Symbol	Name	Symbol
Gabrielite	Gab	Gatewayite	Gwy	Gilalite	Gil	Gonnardite	Gon	Grigorievite	Ggv
Gabrielsonite	Gbr	Gatumbaite	Gtb	Gillardite	Gla	Gonyerite	Gye	Grimaldiite	Gmd
Gachingite	Gac	Gaudefroyite	Gfy	Gillespite	Gls	Goosecreekite	Gck	Grimmite	Gmm
Gadolinite-(Ce)	Gad-Ce	Gaultite	Gau	Gillulyite	Gly	Gorbunovite	Gbv	Grimselite	Gsl
Gadolinite-(Nd)	Gad-Nd	Gauthierite	Gut	Gilmarite	Gmr	Gorceixite	Gcx	Griphite	Gph
Gadolinite-(Y)	Gad-Y	Gayite	Gy	Giniite	Gin	Gordaite	Gda	Grischunite	Gcn
Gagarinite-(Ce)	Gag-Ce	Gaylussite	Gyl	Ginorite	Gnr	Gordonite	Gdo	Groatite	Goa
Gagarinite-(Y)	Gag-Y	Gazeevite	Gaz	Giorgiosite	Gio	Gorerite	Gor	Grokhovskyite	Ghy
Gageite	Gge	Gearksutite	Gak	Giraudite-(Zn)	Gir-Zn	Görgeyite	Gög	Grootfonteinite	Gtf
Gahnite	Ghn	Gebhardite	Geb	Girvasite	Gvs	Gormanite	Gm	Grossite	Gss
Gaidonnayite	Gdn	Gedrite	Ged	Gismondine-Ca	Gis-Ca	Gortdrumite	Gdr	Grossmanite	Gsm
Gaildunningite	Gai	Geerite	Gee	Gismondine-Sr	Gis-Sr	Goryainovite	Gyv	Grossular	Grs
Gainesite	Gns	Geffroyite	Gef	Gittinsite	Git	Goslarite	Gos	Groutite	Gro
Gaitite	Gt	Gehlenite	Gh	Giuseppettite	Giu	Gottardiite	Gtt	Grumantite	Gmt
Gajardoite	Gaj	Geigerite	Ggr	Gjerdingenite-Ca	Gje-Ca	Gottlobite	Got	Grumiplucite	Gpc
Galaxite	Glx	Geikielite	Gk	Gjerdingenite-Fe	Gje-Fe	Götzenite	Göz	Grundmannite	Gdm
Galeaclolusite	Gcl	Gelosaite	Gel	Gjerdingenite-Mn	Gje-Mn	Goudeyite	Gdy	Grunerite	Gru
Galeite	Gle	Geminite	Gem	Gjerdingenite-Na	Gje-Na	Gowerite	Gow	Gruzdevite	Gzd
Galena	Gn	Gengenbachite	Gnb	Gladite	Gld	Goyazite	Goy	Guanacoite	Gnc
Galenobismutite	Gbit	Genkinite	Gki	Gladiusite	Gds	Graemite	Gmi	Guanajuatite	Gj
Galgenbergite-(Ce)	Ggb-Ce	Genplesite	Gpl	Gladkovskyite	Gkv	Graeserite	Gsr	Guanine	Gni
Galileiite	Gll	Genthelvite	Ghv	Glagolevite	Ggl	Graftonite	Gft	Guarinoite	Gua
Galkhaite	Gkh	Geocronite	Geo	Glauberite	Glb	Graftonite-(Ca)	Gft-Ca	Gudmundite	Gu
Galliskiite	Glk	Georgbarsanovite	Gba	Glaucocerinite	Gc	Graftonite-(Mn)	Gft-Mn	Guérinite	Gué
Gallite	Gal	Georgbokiite	Gbk	Glaucochroite	Glc	Gramaccioliite-(Y)	Gmc-Y	Guettardite	Gue
Gallobeudantite	Gbdn	Georgechaoite	Gch	Glaucodot	Gl	Grammatikopoulosite	Gmk	Gugiaite	Gug
Galloplumbogummite	Gpbg	George-ericksenite	Gek	Glauconite	Glt	Grandaite	Grd	Guidottiite	Gdt
Galuskinite	Gkn	Georgeite	Gg	Glaucophane	Gln	Grandidierite	Gdd	Guildite	Gdi
Gamagarite	Gam	Georgerobinsonite	Grb	Glaukosphaerite	Gks	Grandreefite	Grf	Guilleminite	Gul
Gananite	Gan	Georgiadesite	Ggd	Glikinite	Gli	Grandviewite	Gvw	Guimarãesite	Grã
Ganomalite	Gnm	Gerasimovskite	Gms	Glucine	Glu	Grantsite	Gs	Guite	Gui
Ganophyllite	Gnp	Gerdtremmelite	Gtm	Glushinskite	Gsk	Graphite	Gr	Gungerite	Gng
Ganterite	Gtr	Gerenite-(Y)	Gnt-Y	Gmalimite	Gma	Grațianite	Gți	Gunningite	Gnn
Gaotaiite	Gao	Gerhardtite	Ghd	Gmelinite-Ca	Gme-Ca	Gratonite	Gtn	Günterblassite	Gbl
Garavellite	Grv	Germanite	Ger	Gmelinite-K	Gme-K	Grattarolaite	Gra	Gunterite	Gun
Garmite	Grm	Germanocolusite	Gclu	Gmelinite-Na	Gme-Na	Graulichite-(Ce)	Grl-Ce	Gupeiite	Gup
Garnet	Grt	Gersdorffite-P213	Gdf-P213	Gobbinsite	Gbb	Graulichite-(La)	Grl-La	Gurimite	Gur
Garpenbergite	Gpb	Gersdorffite-Pa3	Gdf-Pa3	Gobelinite	Gob	Gravegliaite	Gvg	Gustavite	Gus
Garrelsite	Grr	Gersdorffite-Pca21	Gdf-Pca21	Godlevskite	Go	Grayite	Gry	Gutkovaite-Mn	Gko-Mn
Garronite-Ca	Grn-Ca	Gerstleyite	Gst	Godovikovite	God	Grechishchevite	Gcv	Guyanaite	Guy
Garronite-Na	Grn-Na	Gerstmannite	Gmn	Goedkenite	Goe	Greenalite	Gre	Gwihabaite	Gwi
Gartrellite	Gtl	Geschieberite	Gsb	Goethite	Gth	Greenlizardite	Glz	Gypsum	Gp
Garutiite	Gar	Getchellite	Get	Gold (aurum)	Au	Greenockite	Gnk	Gyrolite	Gyr
Garyansellite	Gas	Geversite	Gev	Goldfieldite	Gf	Greenwoodite	Gwd	Gysinite-(Nd)	Gys-Nd
Gasparite-(Ce)	Gsp-Ce	Ghiaraite	Ghi	Goldhillite	Gdh	Gregoryite	Ggy		
Gasparite-(La)	Gsp-La	Giacovazzoite	Gvz	Goldichite	Gol	Greifensteinite	Gfs		
Gaspéite	Gpé	Gianellaite	Gia	Goldmanite	Glm	Greigite	Grg		
Gatedalite	Gtd	Gibbsite	Gbs	Goldquarryite	Gqy	Grenmarite	Grn		
Gatehouseite	Ghs	Giessenite	Gie	Goldschmidtite	Gsc	Grguricite	Ggu		
Gatelite-(Ce)	Gat-Ce	Giftgrubeite	Gif	Golyshevite	Gsv	Griceite	Gri		

== H ==
Name	Symbol	Name	Symbol	Name	Symbol	Name	Symbol	Name	Symbol	Name	Symbol
Haapalaite	Ha	Hauerite	Hr	Heptasartorite	Hsat	Hizenite-(Y)	Hiz-Y	Hügelite	Hüg	Hydroxycalcioroméite	Hcr
Hafnon	Haf	Hausmannite	Hsm	Herbertsmithite	Her	Hjalmarite	Hja	Hughesite	Hug	Hydroxycancrinite	Hccn
Hagendorfite	Hag	Haüyne	Hyn	Hercynite	Hc	Hloušekite	Hšk	Huizingite-(Al)	Hui-Al	Hydroxyferroroméite	Hfr
Haggertyite	Hgt	Hawleyite	Hwl	Herderite	Hrd	Hocartite	Hoc	Hulsite	Hls	Hydroxykenoelsmoreite	Hykm
Häggite	Hgg	Hawthorneite	Hwt	Hereroite	Hre	Hochelagaite	Haga	Humberstonite	Hbe	Hydroxykenomicrolite	Hykmic
Hagstromite	Hgs	Haxonite	Hax	Hermannjahnite	Hjh	Hodgesmithite	Hdg	Humboldtine	Hbd	Hydroxykenopyrochlore	Hykpcl
Haidingerite	Hdi	Haycockite	Hyc	Hermannroseite	Hro	Hodgkinsonite	Hgk	Humite	Hu	Hydroxylapatite	Hap
Haigerachite	Hga	Haydeeite	Hyd	Herzenbergite	Hzb	Hodrušite	Hod	Hummerite	Hum	Hydroxylbastnäsite-(Ce)	Hbsn-Ce
Haineaultite	Hnt	Haynesite	Hay	Hessite	Hes	Hoelite	Hoe	Hunchunite	Hcn	Hydroxylbastnäsite-(La)	Hbsn-La
Hainite-(Y)	Hai-Y	Hazenite	Hz	Hetaerolite	Hta	Hoganite	Hgn	Hundholmenite-(Y)	Hhm-Y	Hydroxylbastnäsite-(Nd)	Hbsn-Nd
Haitaite-(La)	Hti-La	Heamanite-(Ce)	Hea-Ce	Heterogenite	Htg	Hogarthite	Hog	Hungchaoite	Hch	Hydroxylborite	Hyb
Haiweeite	Hwe	Heazlewoodite	Hzl	Heteromorphite	Htm	Högbomite	Hög	Huntite	Hun	Hydroxylchondrodite	Hchn
Hakite-(Hg)	Hak-Hg	Hechtsbergite	Heb	Heterosite	Het	Høgtuvaite	Htu	Hureaulite	Hur	Hydroxylclinohumite	Hchu
Halamishite	Hla	Hectorfloresite	Hfl	Heulandite-Ba	Hul-Ba	Hohmannite	Hoh	Hurlbutite	Hrb	Hydroxyledgrewite	Hegr
Håleniusite-(Ce)	Hål-Ce	Hectorite	Htr	Heulandite-Ca	Hul-Ca	Holdawayite	Hdw	Hutcheonite	Htn	Hydroxylellestadite	Hel
Håleniusite-(La)	Hål-La	Hedegaardite	Hed	Heulandite-K	Hul-K	Holdenite	Hde	Hutchinsonite	Hut	Hydroxylgugiaite	Hgug
Halilsarpite	Hsp	Hedenbergite	Hd	Heulandite-Na	Hul-Na	Holfertite	Hlf	Huttonite	Ht	Hydroxylhedyphane	Hhdy
Halite	Hl	Hedleyite	Hdl	Heulandite-Sr	Hul-Sr	Hollandite	Hol	Hyalotekite	Hya	Hydroxylherderite	Hhd
Hallimondite	Hll	Hedyphane	Hdp	Hewettite	Hew	Hollingworthite	Hlw	Hydrobasaluminite	Hba	Hydroxylpyromorphite	Hpm
Halloysite-10Å	Hly-10Å	Heftetjernite	Hef	Hexacelsian	Hcls	Hollisterite	Hli	Hydrobiotite	Hbt	Hydroxylwagnerite	Hwag
Halloysite-7Å	Hly-7Å	Heideite	Hei	Hexaferrum	Hfe	Holmquistite	Hlm	Hydroboracite	Hbo	Hydroxymanganopyrochlore	Hmpcl
Halotrichite	Hth	Heidornite	Hdn	Hexahydrite	Hhy	Holtedahlite	Htd	Hydrocalumite	Hcl	Hydroxymcglassonite-(K)	Hmg-K
Halurgite	Hlg	Heinrichite	Hrc	Hexahydroborite	Hhb	Holtite	Hlt	Hydrocerussite	Hcer	Hydroxynatropyrochlore	Hnpcl
Hambergite	Hb	Heisenbergite	Hsb	Hexamolybdenum	Hmo	Holtstamite	Hts	Hydrochlorborite	Hcb	Hydroxyplumbopyrochlore	Hppcl
Hammarite	Hmr	Hejtmanite	Hej	Heyerdahlite	Hdh	Homilite	Hom	Hydrodelhayelite	Hdhy	Hydrozincite	Hznc
Hanauerite	Hna	Heklaite	Hek	Heyite	Hyt	Honeaite	Hne	Hydrodresserite	Hdrs	Hylbrownite	Hbw
Hanawaltite	Hnw	Hellandite-(Ce)	Hld-Ce	Heyrovskýite	Hyv	Honessite	Hon	Hydroglauberite	Hglb	Hypercinnabar	Hcin
Hancockite	Hnc	Hellandite-(Y)	Hld-Y	Hezuolinite	Hez	Hongheite	Hgh	Hydrogrossular	Hgrs	Hyršlite	Hyr
Hanjiangite	Hji	Hellyerite	Hy	Hiärneite	Hiä	Hongshiite	Hng	Hydrohalite	Hhl	Hyttsjöite	Hyj
Hanksite	Hks	Helmutwinklerite	Hwk	Hibbingite	Hib	Honzaite	Hzt	Hydrohonessite	Hhon		
Hannayite	Han	Helvine	Hlv	Hibonite	Hbn	Hopeite	Hop	Hydrokenoelsmoreite	Hkm		
Hannebachite	Hbc	Hematite	Hem	Hibschite	Hbs	Horákite	Hor	Hydrokenomicrolite	Hkmic		
Hansblockite	Hbk	Hematolite	Hmt	Hidalgoite	Hid	Hornblende	Hbl	Hydrokenopyrochlore	Hkpcl		
Hansesmarkite	Hmk	Hematophanite	Hph	Hielscherite	Hsc	Hörnesite	Hns	Hydrokenoralstonite	Hkra		
Hapkeite	Hpk	Hemihedrite	Hhe	Hieratite	Hie	Horomanite	Hmn	Hydromagnesite	Hmgs		
Haradaite	Hra	Hemimorphite	Hmp	Hilairite	Hlr	Horváthite-(Y)	Hrv-Y	Hydrombobomkulite	Hmbb		
Hardystonite	Hdy	Hemleyite	Hle	Hilarionite	Hrn	Hotsonite	Hot	Hydroniumjarosite	Hjrs		
Harkerite	Hkr	Hemloite	Hlo	Hilgardite	Hgr	Housleyite	Hou	Hydroniumpharmacoalumite	Hpal		
Harmotome	Hrm	Hemusite	Hm	Hillebrandite	Hil	Howardevansite	Hdv	Hydroniumpharmacosiderite	Hpsd		
Harmunite	Hmu	Hendekasartorite	Hksat	Hillesheimite	Hlh	Howieite	Hw	Hydropascoite	Hpas		
Harrisonite	Hrs	Hendersonite	Hdr	Hillite	Hi	Howlite	How	Hydropyrochlore	Hpcl		
Harstigite	Har	Hendricksite	Hds	Hingganite-(Ce)	Hin-Ce	Hrabákite	Hbá	Hydroromarchite	Hrom		
Hasanovite	Has	Heneuite	Hn	Hingganite-(Nd)	Hin-Nd	Hsianghualite	Hsi	Hydroscarbroite	Hsca		
Hashemite	Hsh	Henmilite	Hen	Hingganite-(Y)	Hin-Y	Huanghoite-(Ce)	Hho-Ce	Hydrotalcite	Htc		
Hastingsite	Hst	Hennomartinite	Hma	Hingganite-(Yb)	Hin-Yb	Huangite	Hua	Hydroterskite	Hter		
Hatchite	Hat	Henritermierite	Hri	Hinsdalite	Hda	Huanzalaite	Hza	Hydrotungstite	Htgs		
Hatertite	Htt	Henryite	Hry	Hiortdahlite	Hio	Hubeite	Hub	Hydrowoodwardite	Hwwd		
Hatrurite	Hrr	Henrymeyerite	Hmy	Hiroseite	Hir	Hübnerite	Hbr	Hydroxyapophyllite-(K)	Hapo-K		
Hauchecornite	Hau	Hentschelite	Hsl	Hisingerite	Hsg	Huemulite	Hml	Hydroxycalciomicrolite	Hcmic		
Hauckite	Hck	Hephaistosite	Hep	Hitachiite	Hit	Huenite	Hue	Hydroxycalciopyrochlore	Hcpcl		

== I ==
Name	Symbol	Name	Symbol	Name	Symbol	Name	Symbol
Ianbruceite	Ibc	Ilyukhinite	Ily	Iranite	Irn	Ivanyukite-Cu	Iv-Cu
Iangreyite	Igy	Imandrite	Ima	Iraqite-(La)	Irq-La	Ivanyukite-K	Iv-K
Ianthinite	Ian	Imayoshiite	Iys	Irarsite	Irs	Ivanyukite-Na	Iv-Na
Ice	Ice	Imhofite	Imh	Irhtemite	Irh	Ivsite	Ivs
Ice-VII	Ice-VII	Imiterite	Imi	Iridarsenite	Ird	Iwashiroite-(Y)	Iwa-Y
Ichnusaite	Ich	Imogolite	Imo	Iridium	Ir	Iwateite	Iw
Igelströmite	Ig	Inderite	Idr	Irtyshite	Irt	Ixiolite-(Fe^{2+})	Ix-Fe
Icosahedrite	Ihd	Inaglyite	Ina	Iriginite	Irg	Ixiolite-(Mn^{2+})	Ix-Mn
Idaite	Ida	Incomsartorite	Isat	Irinarassite	Inr	Iyoite	Iy
Idrialite	Id	Inderborite	Ibo	Iron (ferrum)	Fe	Izoklakeite	Iz
Iimoriite-(Y)	Iim-Y	Indialite	Ind	Iseite	Is		
Ikaite	Ika	Indigirite	Idg	Ishiharaite	Ish		
Ikranite	Ikr	Indite	Idt	Ishikawaite	Ikw		
Ikunolite	Ik	Indium	In	Isoclasite	Icl		
Ilesite	Ile	Inesite	Ins	Isocubanite	Icb		
Ilímaussite-(Ce)	Ilí-Ce	Ingersonite	Igs	Isoferroplatinum	Ifpt		
Ilinskite	Isk	Ingodite	Ing	Isokite	Iso		
Ilirneyite	Iny	Innelite	Inn	Isolueshite	Isl		
Illite	Ilt	Innsbruckite	Ibk	Isomertieite	Ism		
Ilmajokite-(Ce)	Ijk-Ce	Insizwaite	Isw	Isovite	Isv		
Ilmenite	Ilm	Intersilite	Isi	Isselite	Iss		
Illoqite-(Ce)	Ilo-Ce	Inyoite	Iyo	Itelmenite	Itm		
Ilsemannite	Ils	Iodargyrite	Iag	Itoigawaite	Ito		
Iltisite	Iti	Iowaite	Iow	Itoite	It		
Ilvaite	Ilv	Iquiqueite	Iqu	Itsiite	Its		

== J ==
Name	Symbol	Name	Symbol	Name	Symbol	Name	Symbol	Name	Symbol
Jáchymovite	Jác	Jamborite	Jbr	Jeppeite	Jep	Johnsomervilleite	Jsv	Julienite	Jln
Jacobsite	Jcb	Jamesite	Jms	Jeremejevite	Jer	Johntomaite	Jtm	Jungite	Jun
Jacquesdietrichite	Jdt	Jamesonite	Ja	Jerrygibbsite	Jgb	Johnwalkite	Jwk	Junitoite	Jit
Jacutingaite	Jac	Janchevite	Jan	Jervisite	Je	Jôkokuite	Jôk	Junoite	Jnt
Jadarite	Jad	Janggunite	Jgn	Ježekite	Jež	Joliotite	Jol	Juonniite	Juo
Jadeite	Jd	Janhaugite	Jhg	Jianshuiite	Jia	Jolliffeite	Jlf	Jurbanite	Jur
Jaffeite	Jaf	Jankovićite	Jkv	Jimboite	Jbo	Jonassonite	Jo	Jusite	Ju
Jagoite	Jg	Jarandolite	Jdo	Jimthompsonite	Jim	Jonesite	Jon		
Jagowerite	Jgw	Jarlite	Jar	Jingsuiite	Ji	Joosteite	Joo		
Jagüéite	Jag	Jarosewichite	Jrw	Jinshajiangite	Jsh	Jordanite	Jrd		
Jahnsite-(CaFeMg)	Jah-CaFeMg	Jarosite	Jrs	Jixianite	Jix	Jordisite	Jds		
Jahnsite-(CaMnFe)	Jah-CaMnFe	Jaskólskiite	Jks	Joanneumite	Joa	Jørgensenite	Jør		
Jahnsite-(CaMnMg)	Jah-CaMnMg	Jasmundite	Jas	Joaquinite-(Ce)	Jq-Ce	Jörgkellerite	Jgk		
Jahnsite-(CaMnMn)	Jah-CaMnMn	Jasonsmithite	Jsm	Joegoldsteinite	Jgs	Joséite-A	Js-A		
Jahnsite-(CaMnZn)	Jah-CaMnZn	Jasrouxite	Jrx	Joëlbruggerite	Jbg	Joséite-B	Js-B		
Jahnsite-(MnMnFe)	Jah-MnMnFe	Jaszczakite	Jzz	Joesmithite	Joe	Joteite	Jot		
Jahnsite-(MnMnMg)	Jah-MnMnMg	Javorieite	Jav	Johachidolite	Jhd	Jouravskite	Jou		
Jahnsite-(MnMnMn)	Jah-MnMnMn	Jeanbandyite	Jbd	Johanngeorgenstadtite	Jgg	Juabite	Jua		
Jahnsite-(MnMnZn)	Jah-MnMnZn	Jeankempite	Jkp	Johannite	Jh	Juangodoyite	Jgd		
Jahnsite-(NaFeMg)	Jah-NaFeMg	Jedwabite	Jed	Johannsenite	Jhn	Juanitaite	Jni		
Jahnsite-(NaMnMg)	Jah-NaMnMg	Jeffbenite	Jef	Johillerite	Jhl	Juanite	Jn		
Jahnsite-(NaMnMn)	Jah-NaMnMn	Jeffreyite	Jfy	Johnbaumite	Jbm	Juansilvaite	Jsl		
Jaipurite	Jai	Jennite	Jnn	Johninnesite	Jin	Julgoldite-(Fe2+)	Jul-Fe2+		
Jakobssonite	Jak	Jensenite	Jen	Johnkoivulaite	Joh	Julgoldite-(Fe3+)	Jul-Fe3+		
Jalpaite	Jal	Jentschite	Jts	Johnsenite-(Ce)	Jsn-Ce	Julgoldite-(Mg)	Jul-Mg		

== K ==
Name	Symbol	Name	Symbol	Name	Symbol	Name	Symbol	Name	Symbol	Name	Symbol
Kaatialaite	Kaa	Kasatkinite	Ksk	Khesinite	Khe	Koechlinite	Kcl	Krettnichite	Knc	Kyrgyzstanite	Kyr
Kadyrelite	Kad	Kashinite	Ksh	Khibinskite	Khi	Koenenite	Koe	Kribergite	Kbg	Kyzylkumite	Kyz
Kaersutite	Krs	Kaskasite	Kks	Khinite	Khn	Kogarkoite	Kog	Krieselite	Kes		
Kahlenbergite	Klb	Kasolite	Kso	Khmaralite	Kma	Kojonenite	Koj	Krinovite	Kvi		
Kahlerite	Kah	Kassite	Kas	Khomyakovite	Kmy	Kokchetavite	Kct	Kristiansenite	Kse		
Kainite	Kai	Kastningite	Kng	Khorixasite	Kho	Kokinosite	Kkn	Krivovichevite	Kvv		
Kainosite-(Y)	Kno-Y	Katayamalite	Kyl	Khrenovite	Khr	Koksharovite	Kok	Kröhnkite	Khk		
Kainotropite	Ktr	Katerinopoulosite	Kpo	Khristovite-(Ce)	Kh-Ce	Koktaite	Kkt	Krotite	Kro		
Kaitianite	Ktn	Katiarsite	Kts	Khurayyimite	Khu	Kolarite	Kla	Kroupaite	Kpa		
Kalborsite	Kbs	Katoite	Kto	Khvorovite	Khv	Kolbeckite	Kbe	Kruijenite	Kje		
Kalgoorlieite	Kgl	Katophorite	Ktp	Kiddcreekite	Kck	Kolfanite	Kfn	Krupičkaite	Kpč		
Kaliborite	Kbo	Katoptrite	Ktt	Kidwellite	Kdw	Kolicite	Kol	Krupkaite	Krp		
Kalicinite	Kcn	Katsarosite	Kat	Kieftite	Kie	Kolitschite	Klt	Kruťaite	Krt		
Kalifersite	Klf	Kawazulite	Kaw	Kieserite	Ksr	Kollerite	Klr	Krutovite	Kru		
Kalininite	Kal	Kayrobertsonite	Kay	Kihlmanite-(Ce)	Kih-Ce	Kolovratite	Klv	Kryachkoite	Kyh		
Kalinite	Kli	Kazakhstanite	Kaz	Kilchoanite	Ki	Kolskyite	Ksy	Kryzhanovskite	Kry		
Kaliochalcite	Kch	Kazakovite	Kzk	Killalaite	Kil	Kolwezite	Kwz	Ktenasite	Kte		
Kaliophilite	Klp	Kazanskyite	Kzs	Kimrobinsonite	Kim	Kolymite	Kym	Kuannersuite-(Ce)	Kua-Ce		
Kalistrontite	Kst	Keckite	Kec	Kimuraite-(Y)	Kmu-Y	Komarovite	Kmv	Kudriavite	Kdv		
Kalithallite	Kth	Kegelite	Keg	Kimzeyite	Kmz	Kombatite	Kb	Kudryavtsevaite	Kud		
Kalsilite	Kls	Kegginite	Kgn	Kingite	Kgi	Komkovite	Kkv	Kufahrite	Kuf		
Kalungaite	Klu	Keilite	Ke	Kingsgateite	Kgg	Konderite	Kdr	Kukharenkoite-(Ce)	Kkk-Ce		
Kamaishilite	Kam	Keithconnite	Kei	Kingsmountite	Kmo	Koninckite	Kon	Kukharenkoite-(La)	Kkk-La		
Kamarizaite	Kmr	Keiviite-(Y)	Kvi-Y	Kingstonite	Kgs	Kononovite	Knv	Kukisvumite	Kki		
Kambaldaite	Kbd	Keiviite-(Yb)	Kvi-Yb	Kinichilite	Kni	Konyaite	Kny	Kuksite	Kuk		
Kamchatkite	Kmc	Keldyshite	Kel	Kinoite	Kin	Koragoite	Kgo	Kulanite	Kul		
Kamenevite	Kne	Kellyite	Kly	Kinoshitalite	Kns	Koritnigite	Kor	Kuliginite	Klg		
Kamiokite	Kmk	Kelyanite	Kyn	Kintoreite	Kt	Kornelite	Knl	Kuliokite-(Y)	Klo-Y		
Kamitugaite	Ktg	Kemmlitzite	Kml	Kipushite	Kip	Kornerupine	Krn	Kulkeite	Klk		
Kamotoite-(Y)	Kmt-Y	Kempite	Kp	Kircherite	Kcr	Korobitsynite	Kbi	Kullerudite	Krd		
Kampelite	Kpl	Kenhsuite	Khs	Kirchhoffite	Khf	Korshunovskite	Kss	Kumdykolite	Kdy		
Kampfite	Kpf	Kenngottite	Kgt	Kirkiite	Krk	Koryakite	Kyk	Kummerite	Kum		
Kamphaugite-(Y)	Khg-Y	Kenoargentotennantite-(Fe)	Katnt-Fe	Kirschsteinite	Kir	Korzhinskite	Kzh	Kumtyubeite	Kty		
Kanemite	Knm	Kenoargentotetrahedrite-(Fe)	Kattr-Fe	Kiryuite	Kyu	Kosmochlor	Kos	Kunatite	Kun		
Kangite	Kg	Kenoargentotetrahedrite-(Zn)	Kattr-Zn	Kishonite	Kis	Kosnarite	Ksn	Kupčíkite	Kup		
Kangjinlaite	Kjl	Kenoplumbomicrolite	Kpmic	Kitagohaite	Kgh	Kostovite	Ktv	Kupletskite	Kpt		
Kaňkite	Kňk	Kenotobermorite	Ktbm	Kitkaite	Kk	Kostylevite	Ksv	Kupletskite-(Cs)	Kpt-Cs		
Kannanite	Kna	Kentbrooksite	Ktb	Kittatinnyite	Kit	Kotoite	Ko	Kuramite	Ku		
Kanoite	Knt	Kentrolite	Ken	Kladnoite	Kdn	Kottenheimite	Khm	Kuranakhite	Kkh		
Kanonaite	Kan	Kenyaite	Kya	Klajite	Klj	Köttigite	Köt	Kuratite	Kur		
Kanonerovite	Knr	Keplerite	Kep	Klaprothite	Kpr	Kotulskite	Ktu	Kurchatovite	Kht		
Kaolin	Kn	Kerimasite	Kms	Klebelsbergite	Kbb	Koutekite	Kou	Kurgantaite	Kga		
Kaolinite	Kln	Kermesite	Kem	Kleberite	Kbr	Kovdorskite	Kov	Kurilite	Kri		
Kapellasite	Kap	Kernite	Ker	Kleemanite	Klm	Kozoite-(La)	Koz-La	Kurnakovite	Kko		
Kapitsaite-(Y)	Ksa-Y	Kernowite	Knw	Kleinite	Kle	Kozoite-(Nd)	Koz-Nd	Kurumsakite	Krm		
Kapundaite	Kpd	Kerolite	Krl	Klöchite	Klö	Kozyrevskite	Kzy	Kusachiite	Kus		
Kapustinite	Kpu	Kesebolite-(Ce)	Ksb-Ce	Klockmannite	Kl	Kraisslite	Ksl	Kushiroite	Ks		
Karasugite	Krg	Kësterite	Kës	Klyuchevskite	Kyv	Krasheninnikovite	Krh	Kutinaite	Kti		
Karchevskyite	Kcv	Kettnerite	Ket	Knasibfite	Ksf	Krásnoite	Krá	Kutnohorite	Kut		
Karelianite	Kar	Keutschite	Keu	Knorringite	Krr	Krasnoshteinite	Knh	Kuvaevite	Kuv		
Karenwebberite	Kwb	Keyite	Key	Koashvite	Koa	Krasnovite	Kv	Kuzelite	Kuz		
Karibibite	Kab	Keystoneite	Kys	Kobeite-(Y)	Kob-Y	Kratochvílite	Ktc	Kuzmenkoite-Mn	Kz-Mn		
Karlditmarite	Kdt	K-feldspar	Kfs	Kobellite	Kbl	Krausite	Ksi	Kuzmenkoite-Zn	Kz-Zn		
Karlite	Ka	Khademite	Kdm	Kobokoboite	Kbk	Krauskopfite	Kkp	Kuzminite	Kzm		
Karnasurtite-(Ce)	Ksu-Ce	Khaidarkanite	Kdk	Kobyashevite	Kby	Krautite	Kra	Kuznetsovite	Kzn		
Karpenkoite	Kpk	Khamrabaevite	Krb	Kochite	Koh	Kravtsovite	Kvt	Kvanefjeldite	Kva		
Karpinskite	Kpi	Khanneshite	Kha	Kochkarite	Koc	Kreiterite	Kre	Kyanite	Ky		
Karpovite	Kpv	Kharaelakhite	Klh	Kochsándorite	Ksd	Kremersite	Km	Kyanoxalite	Kox		
Karupmøllerite-Ca	Kmø-Ca	Khatyrkite	Ktk	Kodamaite	Kod	Krennerite	Knn	Kyawthuite	Kyw		

== L ==
Name	Symbol	Name	Symbol	Name	Symbol	Name	Symbol	Name	Symbol
Laachite	Laa	Laumontite	Lmt	Lenoblite	Lnb	Linzhiite	Lzh	Lovdarite	Lov
Labuntsovite-Fe	Lab-Fe	Launayite	Lau	Leogangite	Lgg	Liottite	Lio	Loveringite	Lvg
Labuntsovite-Mg	Lab-Mg	Lauraniite	Lra	Leonardsenite	Lnd	Lipscombite	Lcb	Lovozerite	Lvz
Labuntsovite-Mn	Lab-Mn	Laurelite	Lrl	Leonite	Leo	Lipuite	Lp	Löweite	Löw
Labyrinthite	Lby	Laurentianite	Lre	Leószilárdite	Lsz	Liraite	Lir	Luanheite	Lua
Lacroixite	Lac	Laurentthomasite	Ltm	Lepageite	Lep	Liroconite	Lro	Luanshiweiite	Lsw
Laffittite	Lft	Laurionite	Lri	Lepersonnite-(Gd)	Lps-Gd	Lisanite	Lsa	Luberoite	Lub
Laflammeite	Lfl	Laurite	Lrt	Lepidocrocite	Lpc	Lisetite	Lis	Luboržákite	Lbž
Laforêtite	Laf	Lausenite	Lse	Lepidolite	Lpd	Lishizhenite	Lsh	Lucabindiite	Lbd
Lafossaite	Lfs	Lautarite	Ltr	Lepkhenelmite-Zn	Lpn-Zn	Lisiguangite	Lsg	Lucasite-(Ce)	Lca-Ce
Lagalyite	Lag	Lautenthalite	Lth	Lermontovite	Ler	Lisitsynite	Lss	Lucchesiite	Lcc
Lahnsteinite	Lah	Lautite	Ltt	Letovicite	Let	Liskeardite	Lsk	Luddenite	Ldd
Laihunite	Lai	Lavendulan	Lvd	Leucite	Lct	Lislkirchnerite	Lkn	Ludjibaite	Ldj
Laitakarite	Ltk	Låvenite	Låv	Leucophanite	Lph	Litharge	Lit	Ludlamite	Lud
Lakargiite	Lak	Laverovite	Lvv	Leucophoenicite	Lpo	Lithiomarsturite	Lmsr	Ludlockite	Ldl
Lakebogaite	Lbg	Lavinskyite	Lvs	Leucosphenite	Lsp	Lithiophilite	Lhp	Ludwigite	Ldw
Lalondeite	Lal	Lavoisierite	Lvo	Leucostaurite	Lsr	Lithiophorite	Lpr	Lueshite	Lue
Lammerite	Lmr	Lavrentievite	Lvr	Leucophosphite	Lpp	Lithiophosphate	Lip	Luetheite	Lut
Lammerite-β	Lmr-β	Lawrencite	Law	Levantite	Lev	Lithiotantite	Ltan	Luinaite-(OH) discredited	Lui-OH
Lamprophyllite	Lmp	Lawsonbauerite	Lwb	Leverettite	Lve	Lithiowodginite	Lwdg	Lukechangite-(Ce)	Luk-Ce
Lanarkite	Lan	Lawsonite	Lws	Levinsonite-(Y)	Lvi-Y	Lithosite	Lho	Lukkulaisvaaraite	Lkk
Landauite	Lda	Lazaraskeite	Lza	Lévyclaudite	Lvc	Litidionite	Ltd	Lukrahnite	Lkr
Landesite	Lds	Lazarenkoite	Laz	Lévyne-Ca	Lév-Ca	Litochlebite	Lto	Lulzacite	Lul
Långbanite	Lgb	Lazaridisite	Lrd	Lévyne-Na	Lév-Na	Litvinskite	Ltv	Lumsdenite	Lum
Långbanshyttanite	Lbs	Lazulite	Lzl	Leydetite	Ley	Liudongshengite	Ldh	Lüneburgite	Lbu
Langbeinite	Lbn	Lazurite	Lzr	Liandratite	Lia	Liuite	Liu	Lunijianlaite	Lji
Langhofite	Lhf	Lead (plumbum)	Pb	Liberite	Lbr	Liveingite	Liv	Lun'okite	Lun
Langisite	Lgi	Leadamalgam	Lam	Libethenite	Lib	Liversidgeite	Lsd	Luobusaite	Luo
Langite	Lgt	Leadhillite	Lhi	Liebauite	Lie	Livingstonite	Lst	Luogufengite	Lgf
Lanmuchangite	Lmh	Lechatelierite	Lch	Liebenbergite	Lbb	Lizardite	Lz	Lusernaite-(Y)	Lus-Y
Lannonite	Lnn	Lecontite	Lcn	Liebermannite	Lbm	Llantenesite	Lla	Lussierite	Lsi
Lansfordite	Lfd	Lecoqite-(Y)	Lec-Y	Liebigite	Lbi	Lobanovite	Lbv	Luxembourgite	Lux
Lanthanite-(Ce)	Ltn-Ce	Leesite	Lee	Liguowuite	Lgw	Lokkaite-(Y)	Lok-Y	Luzonite	Luz
Lanthanite-(La)	Ltn-La	Lefontite	Lef	Likasite	Lik	Löllingite	Lö	Lyonsite	Lyo
Lanthanite-(Nd)	Ltn-Nd	Legrandite	Leg	Lileyite	Lly	Lombardoite	Lmb		
Lapeyreite	Lpy	Leguernite	Lg	Lillianite	Lil	Lomonosovite	Lom		
Laphamite	Lpm	Lehmannite	Leh	Lime	Lm	Londonite	Ldn		
Lapieite	Lap	Lehnerite	Lh	Limousinite	Lms	Lonecreekite	Lck		
Laplandite-(Ce)	Lpl-Ce	Leifite	Lf	Linarite	Lna	Lonsdaleite	Lon		
Laptevite-(Ce)	Lpt-Ce	Leightonite	Lgh	Lindackerite	Ldk	Loparite-(Ce)	Lop-Ce		
Larderellite	Ldr	Leisingite	Lei	Lindbergite	Ldb	Lopatkaite	Lpk		
Larisaite	Ls	Leiteite	Lt	Lindgrenite	Lgr	Lópezite	Lpz		
Larnite	Lrn	Lemanskiite	Lmk	Lindqvistite	Lqv	Lorándite	Lor		
Larosite	Lar	Lemmleinite-Ba	Lem-Ba	Lindsleyite	Ldy	Loranskite-(Y)	Lrs-Y		
Larsenite	Lsn	Lemmleinite-K	Lem-K	Lindströmite	Lsm	Lorenzenite	Lrz		
Lasalite	Las	Lemoynite	Lmo	Línekite	Lnk	Loseyite	Los		
Lasnierite	Lnr	Lenaite	Ln	Lingbaoite	Lb	Lotharmeyerite	Lmy		
Latiumite	Lat	Lengenbachite	Len	Lingunite	Lgn	Loudounite	Ldo		
Latrappite	Ltp	Leningradite	Lng	Linnaeite	Lin	Loughlinite	Lou		
Laueite	Lae	Lennilenapeite	Lnl	Lintisite	Lts	Lourenswalsite	Lrw		

== M ==
Name	Symbol	Name	Symbol	Name	Symbol	Name	Symbol	Name	Symbol
Macaulayite	Mcy	Manganberzeliite	Mbzl	Mazzite-Mg	Maz-Mg	Metasaléeite	Mslé	Molybdophyllite	Mdp
Macdonaldite	Mcd	Manganflurlite	Mflu	Mazzite-Na	Maz-Na	Metaschoderite	Msdr	Molysite	My
Macedonite	Mce	Mangangordonite	Mgdo	Mbobomkulite	Mbb	Metaschoepite	Mshp	Momoiite	Mom
Macfallite	Mcf	Manganhumite	Mnhu	Mcallisterite	Mcl	Metasideronatrite	Mnat	Monazite-(Ce)	Mnz-Ce
Machatschkiite	Mct	Manganiakasakaite-(La)	Mnak-La	Mcalpineite	Map	Metastibnite	Msbn	Monazite-(La)	Mnz-La
Machiite	Mci	Manganiandrosite-(Ce)	Mna-Ce	Mcauslanite	Mas	Metastudtite	Mstu	Monazite-(Nd)	Mnz-Nd
Mackayite	Mky	Manganiandrosite-(La)	Mna-La	Mcbirneyite	Mbn	Metaswitzerite	Msw	Monazite-(Sm)	Mnz-Sm
Mackinawite	Mkw	Manganiceladonite	Mcel	Mcconnellite	Mcn	Metatamboite	Mtm	Moncheite	Mon
Macphersonite	Mps	Mangani-dellaventuraite	Mdv	Mccrillisite	Mcr	Metathénardite	Mthn	Monchetundraite	Mtdr
Macquartite	Mcq	Manganilvaite	Mlv	Mcgillite	Mcg	Metatorbernite	Mtor	Monetite	Mnti
Madocite	Mdc	Mangani-obertiite	Mob	Mcgovernite	Mgv	Metatyuyamunite	Mtyu	Mongolite	Mgl
Magadiite	Mgd	Mangani-pargasite	Mprg	Mcguinnessite	Mgu	Metauramphite	Murp	Monimolite	Mml
Magbasite	Mgb	Manganite	Mnn	Mckelveyite-(Y)	Mkv-Y	Metauranocircite-I	Murc-I	Monipite	Mnp
Maghagendorfite	Mhag	Manganlotharmeyerite	Mlmy	Mckinstryite	Mck	Metauranopilite	Mup	Monohydrocalcite	Mhcal
Maghemite	Mgh	Manganoarrojadite-(KNa)	Majd-KNa	Mcnearite	Mnr	Metauranospinite	Musp	Montanite	Mta
Maghrebite	Mhb	Manganobadalovite	Mbdl	Medaite	Med	Metauroxite	Murx	Montbrayite	Mnb
Magnanelliite	Mgn	Manganoblödite	Mblö	Medenbachite	Mdb	Metavandendriesscheite	Mvdd	Montdorite	Mdr
Magnesioalterite	Matr	Manganochromite	Mnchr	Meerschautite	Mee	Metavanmeersscheite	Mvms	Montebrasite	Mbs
Magnesio-arfvedsonite	Marf	Manganoeudialyte	Meud	Megacyclite	Mgc	Metavanuralite	Mvnr	Monteneroite	Mte
Magnesioaubertite	Maub	Mangano-ferri-eckermannite	Mfeck	Megakalsilite	Mks	Metavariscite	Mvar	Monteneveite	Mtv
Magnesiobeltrandoite-2N3S	Mbt-2N3S	Manganohörnesite	Mhns	Megawite	Mgw	Metavauxite	Mvx	Monteponite	Mtp
Magnesiobermanite	Mbrm	Manganokaskasite	Mkks	Meieranite	Mei	Metavivianite	Mviv	Monteregianite-(Y)	Mreg-Y
Magnesiocanutite	Mcan	Manganokhomyakovite	Mkmy	Meierite	Mir	Metavoltine	Mvt	Montesommaite	Mtso
Magnesiocarpholite	Mcar	Manganokukisvumite	Mkki	Meifuite	Mf	Metazellerite	Mzel	Montetrisaite	Mttr
Magnesiochloritoid	Mcld	Manganolangbeinite	Mlgb	Meionite	Me	Metazeunerite	Mzeu	Montgomeryite	Mgm
Magnesiochlorophoenicite	Mcpo	Mangano-mangani-ungarettiite	Mmu	Meisserite	Mss	Meurigite-K	Meu-K	Monticellite	Mtc
Magnesiochromite	Mchr	Manganonaujakasite	Mnj	Meitnerite	Mne	Meurigite-Na	Meu-Na	Montmorillonite	Mnt
Magnesiocopiapite	Mcpi	Manganoneptunite	Mnnpt	Meixnerite	Mxn	Meyerhofferite	Mhf	Montroseite	Mto
Magnesiocoulsonite	Mcou	Manganonordite-(Ce)	Mnor-Ce	Mejillonesite	Mej	Meymacite	Mym	Montroyalite	Mtyl
Magnesiodumortierite	Mdum	Manganoquadratite	Mqd	Melanarsite	Mea	Meyrowitzite	Mey	Montroydite	Mtyd
Magnesio-ferri-fluoro-hornblende	Mffhbl	Manganosegelerite	Msgl	Melanocerite-(Ce)	Mcrt-Ce	Mgriite	Mgi	Mooihoekite	Mho
Magnesioferrite	Mfr	Manganosite	Mng	Melanophlogite	Mp	Mianningite	Min	Moolooite	Moo
Magnesiofluckite	Mfck	Manganostibite	Mnsb	Melanostibite	Mlsb	Miargyrite	May	Mooreite	Mre
Magnesio-fluoro-arfvedsonite	Mfarf	Manganotychite	Mtyc	Melanotekite	Mtk	Miassite	Mia	Moorhouseite	Mh
Magnesio-fluoro-hastingsite	Mfhst	Manganvesuvianite	Mnves	Melanothallite	Mlth	Mica	Mca	Mopungite	Mop
Magnesio-foitite	Mfoi	Mangazeite	Mgz	Melanovanadite	Mvd	Michalskiite	Mcs	Moraesite	Mae
Magnesio-hastingsite	Mhst	Manitobaite	Mtb	Melansonite	Mso	Micheelsenite	Msn	Moraskoite	Mok
Magnesiohatertite	Mhtt	Manjiroite	Mji	Melanterite	Mln	Michenerite	Mch	Mordenite	Mor
Magnesiohögbomite-2N2S	Mhög-2N2S	Mannardite	Man	Melcherite	Mlh	Michitoshiite-(Cu)	Mhs-Cu	Moreauite	Moa
Magnesiohögbomite-2N3S	Mhög-2N3S	Mansfieldite	Mfd	Melilite	Mll	Microcline	Mcc	Morelandite	Mldt
Magnesiohögbomite-2N4S	Mhög-2N4S	Mantienneite	Mtin	Meliphanite	Mph	Microlite	Mic	Morenosite	Mren
Magnesiohögbomite-6N12S	Mhög-6N12S	Maohokite	Mhk	Melkovite	Mko	Microsommite	Msm	Morimotoite	Mmt
Magnesiohögbomite-6N6S	Mhög-6N6S	Maoniupingite-(Ce)	Mao-Ce	Melliniite	Mli	Middendorfite	Mdd	Morinite	Mori
Magnesio-hornblende	Mhbl	Mapimite	Mpm	Mellite	Mel	Middlebackite	Mbk	Morozeviczite	Mzv
Magnesiohulsite	Mhul	Mapiquiroite	Mpq	Mellizinkalite	Mzk	Mieite-(Y)	Mi-Y	Morrisonite	Mris
Magnesiokoritnigite	Mkor	Marathonite	Mth	Melonite	Mlt	Miersite	Mier	Mosandrite-(Ce)	Msd-Ce
Magnesioleydetite	Mley	Marcasite	Mrc	Mélonjosephite	Mjo	Miessiite	Mie	Moschelite	Msch
Magnesio-lucchesiite	Mlcc	Marchettiite	Mht	Menchettiite	Men	Miguelromeroite	Mig	Moschellandsbergite	Mlb
Magnesioneptunite	Mnpt	Marcobaldiite	Mcb	Mendeleevite-(Ce)	Mdl-Ce	Miharaite	Mih	Mosesite	Mos
Magnesionigerite-2N1S	Mgng-2N1S	Marécottite	Mco	Mendeleevite-(Nd)	Mdl-Nd	Mikasaite	Mik	Moskvinite-(Y)	Mskv-Y
Magnesionigerite-6N6S	Mgng-6N6S	Margaritasite	Mgt	Mendigite	Mdg	Mikehowardite	Mhw	Mössbauerite	Msb
Magnesiopascoite	Mpas	Margarite	Mrg	Mendipite	Mdi	Milanriederite	Mlrd	Mottanaite-(Ce)	Mot-Ce
Magnesio-riebeckite	Mrbk	Margarosanite	Mga	Mendozavilite-KCa	Mdz-KCa	Milarite	Mil	Mottramite	Mott
Magnesiorowlandite-(Y)	Mrow-Y	Marialite	Mar	Mendozavilite-NaCu	Mdz-NaCu	Milkovoite	Milk	Motukoreaite	Mtu
Magnesiostaurolite	Mst	Marianoite	Mri	Mendozavilite-NaFe	Mdz-NaFe	Millerite	Mlr	Mounanaite	Mun
Magnesiotaaffeite-2N'2S	Mtf-2N'2S	Marićite	Mrć	Mendozite	Mz	Millisite	Mill	Mountainite	Mtn
Magnesiotaaffeite-6N'3S	Mtf-6N'3S	Maricopaite	Mrp	Meneghinite	Meg	Millosevichite	Msv	Mountkeithite	Mke
Magnesiovesuvianite	Mves	Marinaite	Mr	Menezesite	Mze	Millsite	Mls	Mourite	Mou
Magnesiovoltaite	Mvlt	Marinellite	Mrn	Mengeite	Mge	Milotaite	Mio	Moxuanxueite	Mox
Magnesiozippeite	Mzip	Markascherite	Mac	Mengxianminite	Mgx	Mimetite	Mim	Moydite-(Y)	Moy-Y
Magnesite	Mgs	Markcooperite	Mcp	Meniaylovite	Myl	Minakawaite	Mka	Mozartite	Moz
Magnetite	Mag	Markeyite	Mk	Menshikovite	Mnv	Minasgeraisite-(Y)	Mgr-Y	Mozgovaite	Mzg
Magnetoplumbite	Mpl	Markhininite	Mkh	Menzerite-(Y)	Mzr-Y	Minasragrite	Mra	Mpororoite	Mpo
Magnioursilite	Mau	Marklite	Mkl	Mercallite	Mec	Mineevite-(Y)	Mev-Y	Mrázekite	Mrz
Magnolite	Mno	Marokite	Mro	Mercury (hydrargyrum)	Hg	Minehillite	Mhl	Mroseite	Mros
Magnussonite	Mnu	Marrite	Mrr	Mereheadite	Mrh	Minguzzite	Mzz	Mückeite	Müc
Mahnertite	Mah	Marrucciite	Mru	Mereiterite	Mtr	Minium	Mnm	Muirite	Mui
Mariinskite	Mii	Marshite	Msh	Merelaniite	Ml	Minjiangite	Mjg	Mukhinite	Muk
Maikainite	Mai	Marsturite	Msr	Merenskyite	Mrk	Minnesotaite	Mns	Müllerite	Mül
Majakite	Mjk	Marthozite	Mhz	Meridianiite	Mdn	Minohlite	Mnh	Mullite	Mul
Majindeite	Mjd	Martinandresite	Mad	Merlinoite	Mrl	Minrecordite	Mrd	Mummeite	Mum
Majorite	Maj	Martinite	Mrt	Merrihueite	Mhu	Minyulite	Myu	Munakataite	Mkat
Majzlanite	Mjz	Martyite	Myi	Merrillite	Mer	Mirabilite	Mrb	Mundite	Mud
Makarochkinite	Mkr	Marumoite	Mrm	Mertieite-I	Met-I	Mirnyite	Mny	Mundrabillaite	Mb
Makatite	Mkt	Maruyamaite	Mry	Mertieite-II	Met-II	Misakiite	Msk	Munirite	Mni
Mäkinenite	Mkn	Mascagnite	Msc	Merwinite	Mw	Misenite	Mse	Muonionalustaite	Muo
Makotoite	Mako	Maslovite	Mlo	Mesaite	Msa	Miserite	Mis	Murakamiite	Mkm
Makovickyite	Mvk	Massicot	Msi	Mesolite	Mes	Mitridatite	Mit	Murashkoite	Muh
Malachite	Mlc	Masutomilite	Msu	Messelite	Msl	Mitrofanovite	Mfv	Murataite-(Y)	Mrat-Y
Malanite	Mla	Masuyite	Msy	Meta-aluminite	Ma	Mitryaevaite	Myv	Murchisite	Mur
Malayaite	Mly	Mathesiusite	Mhe	Meta-alunogen	Malg	Mitscherlichite	Mits	Murdochite	Mdh
Maldonite	Mdo	Mathewrogersite	Mwg	Meta-ankoleite	Mak	Mixite	Mix	Murmanite	Mmn
Maleevite	Mle	Mathiasite	Mts	Meta-autunite	Maut	Miyahisaite	Miy	Murunskite	Mu
Maletoyvayamite	Mty	Matildite	Mtd	Metaborite	Mbo	Moabite	Mab	Muscovite	Ms
Malhmoodite	Mmo	Matioliite	Mti	Metacalciouranoite	Mcu	Moctezumite	Moc	Museumite	Mus
Malinkoite	Mlk	Matlockite	Mtl	Metacinnabar	Mcin	Modderite	Mod	Mushistonite	Mhi
Malladrite	Mld	Matsubaraite	Mbr	Metadelrioite	Mdlr	Moëloite	Moë	Muskoxite	Mkx
Mallardite	Mal	Mattagamite	Mtg	Metahaiweeite	Mhwe	Mogánite	Mog	Muthmannite	Mma
Mallestigite	Mlg	Matteuccite	Mtt	Metaheinrichite	Mhrc	Mogovidite	Mgo	Mutinaite	Mut
Malyshevite	Mys	Mattheddleite	Mhd	Metahewettite	Mhew	Mohite	Moh	Mutnovskite	Mvs
Mambertiite	Mam	Matulaite	Mat	Metahohmannite	Mhoh	Möhnite	Möh		
Mammothite	Mm	Matyhite	Myh	Metakahlerite	Mkah	Mohrite	Mhr		
Manaevite-(Ce)	Mv-Ce	Maucherite	Muc	Metakirchheimerite	Mki	Moissanite	Moi		
Manaksite	Mnk	Mauriziodiniite	Mzd	Metaköttigite	Mköt	Mojaveite	Moj		
Manandonite	Mnd	Mavlyanovite	Mav	Metalodèvite	Mldv	Molinelloite	Mnl		
Mandarinoite	Mda	Mawbyite	Mby	Metamunirite	Mmni	Moluranite	Mlu		
Maneckiite	Mnc	Mawsonite	Maw	Metanatroautunite	Mnaut	Molybdenite	Mol		
Manganarsite	Mna	Maxwellite	Max	Metanováčekite	Mnvč	Molybdite	Myb		
Manganbabingtonite	Mbab	Mayingite	Myg	Metarauchite	Mrau	Molybdofornacite	Mfor		
Manganbelyankinite	Mbyn	Mazzettiite	Mzt	Metarossite	Mrs	Molybdomenite	Mdm		

== N ==
Name	Symbol	Name	Symbol	Name	Symbol	Name	Symbol
Nabalamprophyllite	Nlmp	Natrolite	Ntr	Nickel	Ni	Nitscheite	Nih
Nabaphite	Nbh	Natromarkeyite	Nmk	Nickelaustinite	Naus	Niveolanite	Nvl
Nabateaite	Nbt	Natron	Nt	Nickelbischofite	Nbsf	Nixonite	Nix
Nabesite	Nbs	Natronambulite	Nnbl	Nickelblödite	Nblö	Nizamoffite	Niz
Nabiasite	Nbi	Natroniobite	Nnb	Nickelboussingaultite	Nbsg	Nobleite	Nob
Nabimusaite	Nbm	Natropalermoite	Npl	Nickelhexahydrite	Nhhy	Noelbensonite	Noe
Nabokoite	Nab	Natropharmacoalumite	Npal	Nickeline	Nc	Nöggerathite-(Ce)	Nög-Ce
Nacaphite	Ncp	Natropharmacosiderite	Npsd	Nickellotharmeyerite	Nlmy	Nolanite	Nol
Nacareniobsite-(Ce)	Nns-Ce	Natrophilite	Ntp	Nickelphosphide	Nic	Nollmotzite	Nmz
Nacrite	Ncr	Natrophosphate	Nap	Nickelpicromerite	Npmr	Nolzeite	Nlz
Nadorite	Nad	Natrosilite	Ns	Nickelschneebergite	Nsnb	Nontronite	Non
Nafertisite	Naf	Natrosulfatourea	Nsf	Nickelskutterudite	Nskt	Noonkanbahite	Noo
Nagashimalite	Ngs	Natrotantite	Ntan	Nickeltalmessite	Ntlm	Norbergite	Nrb
Nagelschmidtite	Nsc	Natrotitanite	Nttn	Nickeltsumcorite	Ntsm	Nordenskiöldine	Nsk
Nagyágite	Ngy	Natrouranospinite	Nusp	Nickeltyrrellite	Nty	Nordgauite	Ndg
Nahcolite	Nah	Natrowalentaite	Nwal	Nickelzippeite	Nizip	Nordite-(Ce)	Nor-Ce
Nahpoite	Nhp	Natroxalate	Nx	Nickenichite	Nkn	Nordite-(La)	Nor-La
Nakauriite	Nak	Natrozippeite	Nzip	Nickolayite	Nkl	Nordstrandite	Nsd
Nakkaalaaqite	Nka	Naujakasite	Nj	Nicksobolevite	Nsb	Nordströmite	Nsm
Naldrettite	Nld	Naumannite	Nau	Niedermayrite	Ndm	Norilskite	Nrs
Nalipoite	Nlp	Navajoite	Nvj	Nielsbohrite	Nbr	Normandite	Nmd
Nalivkinite	Nlv	Navrotskyite	Nvr	Nielsenite	Nie	Norrishite	Nrr
Namansilite	Nms	Nazarovite	Naz	Nierite	Nr	Norsethite	Nst
Nambulite	Nbl	Nchwaningite	Nwg	Nifontovite	Nif	Northstarite	Nsr
Namibite	Nmb	Nealite	Nea	Niggliite	Nig	Northupite	Nup
Namuwite	Nmw	Nechelyustovite	Nec	Niigataite	Nii	Nosean	Nsn
Nanlingite	Nan	Nefedovite	Nef	Nikischerite	Nik	Nováčekite-I	Nvč-I
Nanpingite	Npg	Negevite	Neg	Nikmelnikovite	Nmn	Nováčekite-II	Nvč-II
Nantokite	Ntk	Neighborite	Nbo	Niksergievite	Nsg	Novákite	Nvá
Naquite	Naq	Nekoite	Nk	Nimite	Nim	Novgorodovaite	Nov
Narsarsukite	Nar	Nekrasovite	Nek	Ningyoite	Nin	Novodneprite	Nnp
Nashite	Nsh	Nelenite	Nln	Niningerite	Nng	Novograblenovite	Ngb
Nasinite	Nas	Neltnerite	Nel	Nioboaeschynite-(Ce)	Naes-Ce	Nowackiite	Now
Nasledovite	Ndv	Nenadkevichite	Nkv	Nioboaeschynite-(Y)	Naes-Y	Nsutite	Nsu
Nasonite	Nso	Neotocite	Neo	Niobocarbide	Ncb	Nuffieldite	Nuf
Nastrophite	Nsp	Nepheline	Nph	Nioboheftetjernite	Nhef	Nukundamite	Nuk
Nataliakulikite	Nkk	Népouite	Npo	Nioboholtite	Nhlt	Nullaginite	Nlg
Nataliyamalikite	Nml	Nepskoeite	Nep	Niobokupletskite	Nbk	Numanoite	Num
Natalyite	Nta	Neptunite	Npt	Niobophyllite	Nbp	Nuragheite	Nur
Natanite	Ntn	Neskevaaraite-Fe	Nsv-Fe	Niocalite	Nio	Nuwaite	Nuw
Natisite	Nts	Nesquehonite	Nes	Nipalarsite	Nip	Nybøite	Nyb
Natrite	Nat	Nestolaite	Ntl	Nisbite	Nis	Nyerereite	Nye
Natroalunite	Nalu	Neustädtelite	Neu	Nishanbaevite	Nbv	Nyholmite	Nyh
Natroaphthitalite	Natt	Nevadaite	Nev	Nisnite	Nn		
Natroboltwoodite	Nbwd	Nevskite	Nvk	Nissonite	Nss		
Natrochalcite	Nch	Newberyite	New	Niter	Nit		
Natrodufrénite	Ndf	Neyite	Ney	Nitratine	Ntt		
Natroglaucocerinite	Ngc	Nežilovite	Než	Nitrobarite	Nba		
Natrojarosite	Njrs	Niahite	Nhi	Nitrocalcite	Ncal		
Natrolemoynite	Nlm	Niasite	Nia	Nitromagnesite	Nmgs		

== O ==
Name	Symbol	Name	Symbol	Name	Symbol	Name	Symbol	Name	Symbol
Oberthürite	Obt	Olenite	Ole	Örebroite	Öbr	Osarizawaite	Orz	Oxo-magnesio-hastingsite	Omhst
Oberwolfachite	Owf	Olgite	Olg	Oregonite	Ore	Osarsite	Osa	Oxo-mangani-leakeite	Omlk
Obradovicite-KCu	Obr-KCu	Olivenite	Oli	Oreillyite	Ory	Osbornite	Obn	Oxybismutomicrolite	Obmic
Obradovicite-NaCu	Obr-NaCu	Olivine	Ol	Organovaite-Mn	Org-Mn	Oscarkempffite	Okp	Oxycalciomicrolite	Ocmic
Obradovicite-NaNa	Obr-NaNa	Olkhonskite	Olk	Organovaite-Zn	Org-Zn	Oskarssonite	Osk	Oxycalciopyrochlore	Ocpcl
O'danielite	Oda	Olmiite	Olm	Orickite	Ori	Osmium	Os	Oxycalcioroméite	Ocr
Odigitriaite	Odi	Olmsteadite	Osd	Orientite	Orn	Osumilite	Osm	Oxy-chromium-dravite	Ocdrv
Odikhinchaite	Odk	Olsacherite	Ols	Orishchinite	Orh	Osumilite-(Mg)	Osm-Mg	Oxy-dravite	Odrv
Odinite	Odn	Olshanskyite	Osh	Orlandiite	Ola	Oswaldpeetersite	Osw	Oxy-foitite	Ofoi
Odintsovite	Odt	Olympite	Oly	Orlovite	Olv	Otavite	Ota	Oxykinoshitalite	Okns
Oenite	Oen	Omariniite	Oma	Orlymanite	Orl	Otjisumeite	Otj	Oxynatromicrolite	Onmic
Offretite	Off	Omeiite	Ome	Orpiment	Orp	Ottemannite	Ott	Oxyphlogopite	Ophl
Oftedalite	Oft	Ominelite	Omi	Orschallite	Ors	Ottensite	Ots	Oxyplumboroméite	Opr
Ogdensburgite	Obu	Omongwaite	Omo	Orthoamphibole	Oamp	Ottohahnite	Ohn	Oxy-schorl	Osrl
Ognitite	Ogn	Omphacite	Omp	Orthobrannerite	Obnr	Ottoite	Oto	Oxystannomicrolite	Omic
Ohmilite	Oh	Omsite	Om	Orthoclase	Or	Ottrélite	Otr	Oxystibiomicrolite	Osmic
Ojuelaite	Ojl	Ondrušite	Ond	Orthocuproplatinum	Ocpt	Otwayite	Otw	Oxy-vanadium-dravite	Ovdrv
Okanoganite-(Y)	Oka-Y	Oneillite	One	Orthojoaquinite-(Ce)	Ojq-Ce	Oulankaite	Oul	Oxyvanite	Oxy
Okayamalite	Oky	Onoratoite	Ono	Orthojoaquinite-(La)	Ojq-La	Ourayite	Our	Oyelite	Oye
Okenite	Oke	Oosterboschite	Oos	Orthominasragrite	Omrg	Oursinite	Osn	Oyonite	Oyo
Okhotskite	Okh	Opal	Opl	Orthopinakiolite	Opki	Ovamboite	Ova	Ozerovaite	Oze
Okieite	Oki	Ophirite	Oph	Orthopyroxene	Opx	Overite	Ove		
Okruschite	Okr	Oppenheimerite	Ohm	Orthoserpierite	Ospe	Owensite	Owe		
Oldhamite	Old	Orcelite	Orc	Orthowalpurgite	Owal	Owyheeite	Owy		
Olekminskite	Okm	Ordoñezite	Ord	Osakaite	Ok	Oxammite	Oxa		

== P ==
Name	Symbol	Name	Symbol	Name	Symbol	Name	Symbol	Name	Symbol
Pääkkönenite	Pä	Parisite-(La)	Pst-La	Phillipsite-Ca	Php-Ca	Polkovicite	Pk	Punkaruaivite	Pka
Paarite	Paa	Parkerite	Prk	Phillipsite-K	Php-K	Polloneite	Plo	Purpurite	Pur
Pabstite	Pab	Parkinsonite	Pkn	Phillipsite-Na	Php-Na	Pollucite	Pol	Pushcharovskite	Pus
Paceite	Pac	Parnauite	Pna	Philolithite	Phi	Polyakovite-(Ce)	Pak-Ce	Putnisite	Pni
Pachnolite	Phn	Parsettensite	Psn	Philoxenite	Pxn	Polyarsite	Par	Putoranite	Put
Packratite	Pkt	Parsonsite	Pso	Philrothite	Phr	Polybasite	Plb	Puttapaite	Ptp
Paddlewheelite	Pdw	Parthéite	Pth	Phlogopite	Phl	Polycrase-(Y) (discredited)	Plc-Y	Putzite	Pzi
Padĕraite	Pdĕ	Parwanite	Prw	Phoenicochroite	Phc	Polydymite	Pld	Pyatenkoite-(Y)	Pyt-Y
Padmaite	Pdm	Parwelite	Pwe	Phosgenite	Pho	Polyhalite	Plhl	Pyracmonite	Pyr
Paganoite	Pgn	Pašavaite	Pšv	Phosinaite-(Ce)	Psi-Ce	Polylithionite	Pln	Pyradoketosite	Pdk
Pahasapaite	Pah	Pascoite	Pas	Phosphammite	Pam	Polyphite	Ppt	Pyrargyrite	Pyg
Painite	Pai	Paseroite	Psr	Phosphocyclite-(Fe)	Pc-Fe	Ponomarevite	Pon	Pyrite	Py
Pakhomovskyite	Phv	Patrónite	Pat	Phosphocyclite-(Ni)	Pc-Ni	Popovite	Ppv	Pyroaurite	Pya
Palarstanide	Pls	Pattersonite	Patt	Phosphoellenbergerite	Pell	Poppiite	Pop	Pyrobelonite	Pbl
Palenzonaite	Plz	Patynite	Pty	Phosphoferrite	Phf	Popugaevaite	Pgv	Pyrochlore	Pcl
Palermoite	Ple	Pauflerite	Pfl	Phosphofibrite	Pfb	Portlandite	Por	Pyrochroite	Pyc
Palladinite	Pdn	Pauladamsite	Pad	Phosphogartrellite	Pgtl	Pošepnýite	Pšý	Pyrolusite	Pyl
Palladium	Pd	Paulingite-Ca	Pau-Ca	Phosphohedyphane	Phdy	Posnjakite	Pnk	Pyromorphite	Pym
Palladoarsenide	Pda	Paulingite-K	Pau-K	Phosphoinnelite	Pinn	Postite	Pos	Pyrope	Prp
Palladobismutharsenide	Pba	Paulkellerite	Pkl	Phosphophyllite	Pp	Potarite	Ptr	Pyrophanite	Pph
Palladodymite	Pdd	Paulkerrite	Pke	Phosphorrösslerite	Prö	Potassic-arfvedsonite	Parf	Pyrophyllite	Prl
Palladogermanide	Pdg	Paulmooreite	Pmo	Phosphosiderite	Phsd	Potassiccarpholite	Pcar	Pyrosmalite-(Fe)	Pys-Fe
Palladosilicide	Psl	Pauloabibite	Pla	Phosphovanadylite-Ba	Pvd-Ba	Potassic-chloro-hastingsite	Pchst	Pyrosmalite-(Mn)	Pys-Mn
Palladothallite	Pdt	Paulscherrerite	Psc	Phosphovanadylite-Ca	Pvd-Ca	Potassic-chloro-pargasite	Pcprg	Pyrostilpnite	Psti
Palladseite	Pds	Pautovite	Ptv	Phosphowalpurgite	Pwal	Potassic-ferri-leakeite	Pflk	Pyroxene	Px
Palmierite	Pmi	Pavlovskyite	Pvs	Phosphuranylite	Puy	Potassic-ferro-ferri-sadanagaite	Pffsdg	Pyroxferroite	Pxf
Palygorskite	Plg	Pavonite	Pav	Phoxite	Phx	Potassic-ferro-ferri-taramite	Pfftrm	Pyroxmangite	Pxm
Pampaloite	Ppl	Paxite	Pax	Phuralumite	Pha	Potassic-ferro-pargasite	Pfprg	Pyrrhotite	Pyh
Panasqueiraite	Psq	Pearceite	Pea	Phurcalite	Phu	Potassic-ferro-sadanagaite	Pfsdg		
Pandoraite-Ba	Pdo-Ba	Peatite-(Y)	Pti-Y	Phylloretine	Pre	Potassic-ferro-taramite	Pftrm		
Pandoraite-Ca	Pdo-Ca	Pecoraite	Pco	Phyllotungstite	Ptgs	Potassic-fluoro-hastingsite	Pfhst		
Panethite	Pne	Pectolite	Pct	Picaite	Pic	Potassic-fluoro-pargasite	Pflprg		
Panguite	Pgu	Peisleyite	Pei	Piccoliite	Pcc	Potassic-fluoro-richterite	Pfrct		
Panichiite	Pnc	Pekoite	Pek	Pickeringite	Pkg	Potassic-hastingsite	Phst		
Panskyite	Pky	Pekovite	Pko	Picotpaulite	Pcp	Potassic-jeanlouisite	Pjl		
Pansnerite	Pns	Péligotite	Pél	Picromerite	Pmr	Potassic-magnesio-arfvedsonite	Pmarf		
Panunzite	Pnz	Pellouxite	Plx	Picropharmacolite	Ppm	Potassic-magnesio-fluoro-arfvedsonite	Pmfarf		
Paolovite	Plv	Pellyite	Ply	Pieczkaite	Pzk	Potassic-magnesio-hastingsite	Pmhst		
Papagoite	Pap	Penberthycroftite	Pbc	Piemontite	Pmt	Potassic-mangani-leakeite	Pmlk		
Paqueite	Paq	Penfieldite	Pfd	Piemontite-(Pb)	Pmt-Pb	Potassic-pargasite	Pprg		
Para-alumohydrocalcite	Pahcal	Penikisite	Pks	Piemontite-(Sr)	Pmt-Sr	Potassic-richterite	Prct		
Paraberzeliite	Pbzl	Penkvilksite	Pvl	Piergorite-(Ce)	Pgo-Ce	Potassic-sadanagaite	Psdg		
Parabrandtite	Pbdt	Pennantite	Pnn	Pierrotite	Pie	Pottsite	Pot		
Parabutlerite	Pbtl	Penobsquisite	Pnb	Pigeonite	Pgt	Poubaite	Pub		
Paracelsian	Pcls	Penroseite	Pen	Pigotite	Pig	Poudretteite	Pou		
Paracoquimbite	Pcoq	Pentagonite	Ptg	Pilawite-(Y)	Plw-Y	Poughite	Pgh		
Paracostibite	Pcsb	Pentahydrite	Phy	Pillaite	Pil	Povondraite	Pov		
Paradamite	Prd	Pentahydroborite	Phb	Pilsenite	Pse	Powellite	Pwl		
Paradocrasite	Pdc	Pentlandite	Pn	Pinakiolite	Pki	Poyarkovite	Poy		
Parádsasvárite	Psv	Penzhinite	Pzh	Pinalite	Pnl	Prachařite	Pcř		
Paraershovite	Psh	Peprossiite-(Ce)	Pep-Ce	Pinchite	Pin	Pradetite	Pde		
Parafiniukite	Pfn	Perbøeite-(Ce)	Pbø-Ce	Pingguite	Png	Prehnite	Prh		
Parafransoletite	Pfsl	Perbøeite-(La)	Pbø-La	Pinnoite	Pno	Preisingerite	Psg		
Parageorgbokiite	Pgbk	Percleveite-(Ce)	Pcv-Ce	Pintadoite	Ptd	Preiswerkite	Pwk		
Paragonite	Pg	Percleveite-(La)	Pcv-La	Piretite	Pir	Preobrazhenskite	Pbz		
Paraguanajuatite	Pgj	Peretaite	Pta	Pirquitasite	Pi	Pretulite	Ptu		
Parahibbingite	Phib	Perettiite-(Y)	Ptt-Y	Pirssonite	Pss	Prewittite	Pwt		
Parahopeite	Phop	Perhamite	Phm	Písekite-(Y)	Pís-Y	Příbramite	Pbm		
Parakeldyshite	Pkel	Periclase	Per	Pitiglianoite	Pgl	Priceite	Pce		
Parakuzmenkoite-Fe	Pkz-Fe	Perite	Pe	Pitticite	Ptc	Priderite	Pdr		
Paralabuntsovite-Mg	Plab-Mg	Perlialite	Pll	Pittongite	Pit	Princivalleite	Pva		
Paralaurionite	Plri	Perloffite	Plf	Piypite	Piy	Pringleite	Pri		
Paralstonite	Pasn	Permingeatite	Pmg	Pizgrischite	Piz	Priscillagrewite-(Y)	Pgr-Y		
Paramarkeyite	Pma	Perovskite	Prv	Plagioclase	Pl	Prismatine	Prm		
Paramelaconite	Pml	Perraultite	Prt	Plagionite	Pgi	Probertite	Pbr		
Paramendozavilite	Pmdz	Perrierite-(Ce)	Prr-Ce	Plancheite	Pch	Proshchenkoite-(Y)	Pck-Y		
Paramontroseite	Pmto	Perrierite-(La)	Prr-La	Planerite	Pnr	Prosopite	Psp		
Paranatisite	Pnts	Perroudite	Pro	Plášilite	Pšl	Prosperite	Ppe		
Paranatrolite	Pntr	Perryite	Pry	Platarsite	Plt	Protasite	Ps		
Paraniite-(Y)	Prn-Y	Pertlikite	Plk	Platinum	Pt	Proto-anthophyllite	Path		
Paraotwayite	Potw	Pertsevite-(F)	Psv-F	Plattnerite	Ptn	Protocaseyite	Pcy		
Parapierrotite	Ppie	Pertsevite-(OH)	Psv-OH	Plavnoite	Pvn	Protochabournéite	Pchb		
Pararaisaite	Prsa	Petalite	Ptl	Playfairite	Pyf	Protoenstatite	Pten		
Pararammelsbergite	Prmb	Petarasite	Pra	Plimerite	Pme	Proto-ferro-anthophyllite	Pfath		
Pararealgar	Prlg	Petedunnite	Pdu	Pliniusite	Pli	Proto-ferro-suenoite	Pfsue		
Pararobertsite	Prb	Peterandresenite	Pan	Plombièrite	Plm	Proudite	Pdi		
Pararsenolamprite	Pasl	Peterbaylissite	Pby	Plumboagardite	Pagr	Proustite	Prs		
Parascandolaite	Psd	Petersenite-(Ce)	Pet-Ce	Plumboferrite	Pfr	Proxidecagonite	Pdec		
Paraschachnerite	Pshn	Petersite-(Ce)	Pts-Ce	Plumbogummite	Pbg	Przhevalskite	Prz		
Paraschoepite	Pshp	Petersite-(La)	Pts-La	Plumbojarosite	Pjrs	Pseudoboleite	Pbol		
Parascholzite	Pslz	Petersite-(Y)	Pts-Y	Plumbonacrite	Pncr	Pseudobrookite	Pbrk		
Parascorodite	Pscd	Petewilliamsite	Pwi	Plumbopalladinite	Ppdn	Pseudocotunnite	Pcot		
Parasibirskite	Psib	Petitjeanite	Pjn	Plumboperloffite	Pplf	Pseudodickthomssenite	Pdth		
Parasterryite	Psty	Petříčekite	Pčk	Plumbopharmacosiderite	Ppsd	Pseudograndreefite	Pgrf		
Parasymplesite	Psym	Petrovicite	Pvc	Plumbophyllite	Pbp	Pseudojohannite	Pjh		
Paratacamite	Pata	Petrovite	Pv	Plumboselite	Pbs	Pseudolaueite	Plae		
Paratacamite-(Mg)	Pata-Mg	Petrovskaite	Pvk	Plumbotellurite	Pbtlr	Pseudolyonsite	Plyo		
Paratacamite-(Ni)	Pata-Ni	Petrukite	Ptk	Plumbotsumite	Ptm	Pseudomalachite	Pmlc		
Paratellurite	Ptlr	Petscheckite	Psk	Plumosite	Plu	Pseudomarkeyite	Pmk		
Paratimroseite	Ptim	Petterdite	Pte	Podlesnoite	Pod	Pseudomeisserite-(NH4)	Pmss-NH_{4}		
Paratobermorite	Ptbm	Petzite	Ptz	Poirierite	Poi	Pseudorutile	Pdrt		
Paratooite-(La)	Pto-La	Pezzottaite	Pez	Poitevinite	Pvi	Pseudosinhalite	Pshl		
Paratsepinite-Ba	Ptse-Ba	Pharmacoalumite	Pal	Pokhodyashinite	Pok	Pseudowollastonite	Pwo		
Paratsepinite-Na	Ptse-Na	Pharmacolite	Pmc	Pokrovskite	Pkr	Pucherite	Puc		
Paraumbite	Pumb	Pharmacosiderite	Pmsd	Polarite	Plr	Pumpellyite-(Al)	Pmp-Al		
Paravauxite	Pvx	Pharmazincite	Pznc	Poldervaartite	Pdv	Pumpellyite-(Fe2+)	Pmp-Fe^{2+}		
Paravinogradovite	Pvgd	Phaunouxite	Pnx	Polekhovskyite	Pkh	Pumpellyite-(Fe3+)	Pmp-Fe^{3+}		
Parawulffite	Pwlf	Phenakite	Phk	Polezhaevaite-(Ce)	Pzv-Ce	Pumpellyite-(Mg)	Pmp-Mg		
Pargasite	Prg	Philipsbornite	Pbn	Polhemusite	Phe	Pumpellyite-(Mn2+)	Pmp-Mn^{2+}		
Parisite-(Ce)	Pst-Ce	Philipsburgite	Pbu	Polkanovite	Pkv	Puninite	Pun		

== Q ==
Name	Symbol	Name	Symbol	Name	Symbol	Name	Symbol
Qandilite	Qnd	Qingheiite	Qin	Quadridavyne	Qdv	Quenstedtite	Qst
Qaqarssukite-(Ce)	Qq-Ce	Qingheiite-(Fe2+)	Qin-Fe^{2+}	Quadruphite	Qua	Quetzalcoatlite	Qzl
Qatranaite	Qat	Qingsongite	Qsg	Quartz	Qz	Quijarroite	Qui
Qeltite	Qlt	Qitianlingite	Qit	Queitite	Que	Quintinite	Qtn
Qilianshanite	Qil	Quadratite	Qd	Quenselite	Qns	Qusongite	Qus

== R ==
Name	Symbol	Name	Symbol	Name	Symbol	Name	Symbol	Name	Symbol
Raadeite	Raa	Rectorite	Rec	Richellite	Rhe	Roselite	Rsl	Rustumite	Rtm
Rabbittite	Rab	Redcanyonite	Rcy	Richelsdorfite	Rdf	Roselite-β	Rsl-β	Ruthenarsenite	Ras
Rabejacite	Rbj	Reddingite	Rdd	Richetite	Rht	Rosemaryite	Rmy	Rutheniridosmine	Rir
Raberite	Rbr	Redgillite	Rgl	Richterite	Rct	Rosenbergite	Ros	Ruthenium	Ru
Radekškodaite-(La)	Ršk-La	Redingtonite	Rdt	Rickardite	Rkd	Rosenbuschite	Rbs	Rutherfordine	Rfd
Radekškodaite-(Ce)	Ršk-Ce	Redledgeite	Red	Rickturnerite	Rtn	Rosenhahnite	Rhh	Rutile	Rt
Radhakrishnaite	Rhk	Redondite	Rdo	Riebeckite	Rbk	Roshchinite	Rch	Ryabchikovite	Rya
Radovanite	Rdv	Reederite-(Y)	Rde-Y	Riesite	Rie	Rosiaite	Rsi	Rynersonite	Rys
Radtkeite	Rdk	Reedmergnerite	Rm	Rietveldite	Rvd	Rosickýite	Rký		
Raguinite	Rgu	Reevesite	Rvs	Rilandite	Ril	Rosièresite	Rsr		
Raisaite	Rsa	Refikite	Ref	Rimkorolgite	Rolg	Rossiantonite	Ran		
Raite	Rai	Reichenbachite	Rbh	Ringwoodite	Rwd	Rossite	Rs		
Rajite	Raj	Reidite	Rei	Rinkite-(Ce)	Rin-Ce	Rösslerite	Rö		
Rakovanite	Rkv	Reinerite	Rnr	Rinkite-(Y)	Rin-Y	Rossmanite	Rsm		
Ralphcannonite	Rcn	Reinhardbraunsite	Rbn	Rinmanite	Rnm	Rossovskyite	Rvy		
Ramaccioniite	Rmc	Relianceite-(K)	Rel-K	Rinneite	Rne	Rostite	Rst		
Ramanite-(Cs)	Ram-Cs	Rémondite-(Ce)	Rém-Ce	Riomarinaite	Rmr	Roterbärite	Rbä		
Ramanite-(Rb)	Ram-Rb	Rémondite-(La)	Rém-La	Ríosecoite	Rse	Rouaite	Rou		
Ramazzoite	Rmz	Renardite	Rnd	Riotintoite	Rio	Roubaultite	Rbl		
Rambergite	Rbg	Rengeite	Rge	Rippite	Rip	Roumaite	Rma		
Ramdohrite	Rdh	Renierite	Ren	Rittmannite	Rit	Rouseite	Rus		
Rameauite	Rme	Reppiaite	Rep	Rivadavite	Riv	Routhierite	Rtr		
Ramikite-(Y)	Rmi-Y	Retgersite	Rtg	Riversideite	Rsd	Rouvilleite	Rvl		
Rammelsbergite	Rmb	Retzian-(Ce)	Rtz-Ce	Roaldite	Roa	Rouxelite	Rxl		
Ramosite	Rms	Retzian-(La)	Rtz-La	Robertsite	Rbt	Roweite	Rwe		
Ramsbeckite	Rbe	Retzian-(Nd)	Rtz-Nd	Robinsonite	Rob	Rowlandite-(Y)	Row-Y		
Ramsdellite	Rmd	Revdite	Rev	Rockbridgeite	Rkb	Rowleyite	Rwl		
Ranciéite	Rnc	Reyerite	Rey	Rodalquilarite	Raq	Roxbyite	Rox		
Rankachite	Rka	Reynoldsite	Ryn	Rodolicoite	Rdl	Roymillerite	Roy		
Rankamaite	Rkm	Rhabdoborite-(Mo)	Rbo-Mo	Roeblingite	Roe	Rozenite	Rzn		
Rankinite	Rnk	Rhabdoborite-(V)	Rbo-V	Roedderite	Rdr	Rozhdestvenskayaite-(Zn)	Roz-Zn		
Ransomite	Rns	Rhabdoborite-(W)	Rbo-W	Rogermitchellite	Rmt	Rruffite	Ruf		
Ranunculite	Rnu	Rhabdophane-(Ce)	Rha-Ce	Roggianite	Rog	Ruarsite	Rua		
Rapidcreekite	Rck	Rhabdophane-(La)	Rha-La	Rohaite	Roh	Rubicline	Rub		
Rappoldite	Rap	Rhabdophane-(Nd)	Rha-Nd	Rokühnite	Rok	Rubinite	Rbi		
Raslakite	Rsk	Rhabdophane-(Y)	Rha-Y	Rollandite	Rol	Rucklidgeite	Ruk		
Raspite	Rsp	Rheniite	Rhn	Romanèchite	Rmn	Rudabányaite	Rdb		
Rastsvetaevite	Rvt	Rhodarsenide	Rda	Romanorlovite	Ror	Rudashevskyite	Rud		
Rasvumite	Rsv	Rhodesite	Rod	Romarchite	Rom	Rudenkoite	Rd		
Rathite	Rat	Rhodium	Rh	Römerite	Röm	Rüdlingerite	Rdg		
Rathite-IV	Rat-IV	Rhodizite	Rdz	Rondorfite	Ron	Ruifrancoite	Rui		
Rauchite	Rau	Rhodochrosite	Rds	Rongibbsite	Rgb	Ruitenbergite	Rtb		
Rauenthalite	Rth	Rhodonite	Rdn	Ronneburgite	Rbu	Ruizite	Rz		
Rauvite	Ruv	Rhodostannite	Rhs	Röntgenite-(Ce)	Rng-Ce	Rumoiite	Rmo		
Ravatite	Rav	Rhodplumsite	Rhp	Rooseveltite	Roo	Rumseyite	Rum		
Raygrantite	Rgr	Rhomboclase	Rbc	Roquesite	Ro	Rusakovite	Rko		
Rayite	Ray	Rhönite	Rhö	Rorisite	Rrs	Rusinovite	Rnv		
Realgar	Rlg	Ribbeite	Rib	Rosasite	Rss	Russellite	Rll		
Reaphookhillite	Rea	Richardsite	Ric	Roscherite	Rsc	Russoite	Rso		
Rebulite	Reb	Richardsollyite	Rsy	Roscoelite	Rcl	Rustenburgite	Rsb		

== S ==
Name	Symbol	Name	Symbol	Name	Symbol	Name	Symbol	Name	Symbol
Saamite	Saa	Schneiderhöhnite	Snh	Shomiokite-(Y)	Shom-Y	Spherocobaltite	Scbt	Strontio-orthojoaquinite	Sojq
Sabatierite	Sab	Schoderite	Sde	Shortite	Sot	Spinel	Spl	Strontioperloffite	Splf
Sabelliite	Sbl	Schoenfliesite	Sfs	Shosanbetsuite	Ssb	Spionkopite	Spi	Strontiopharmacosiderite	Spsd
Sabieite	Sbi	Schoepite	Sho	Shuangfengite	Sfg	Spiridonovite	Srv	Strontioruizite	Srz
Sabinaite	Sba	Schöllhornite	Slh	Shubnikovite	Snk	Spiroffite	Spf	Strontiowhitlockite	Swht
Sabugalite	Sbg	Scholzite	Slz	Shuiskite-(Cr)	Sui-Cr	Spodumene	Spd	Strunzite	Snz
Saccoite	Sac	Schoonerite	Soo	Shuiskite-(Mg)	Sui-Mg	Spriggite	Sgg	Struvite	Suv
Sacrofanite	Scf	Schorl	Srl	Shulamitite	Sla	Springcreekite	Sck	Struvite-(K)	Suv-K
Sadanagaite	Sdg	Schorlomite	Slo	Shumwayite	Smw	Spryite	Syi	Studenitsite	Sdn
Saddlebackite	Sdd	Schreibersite	Scb	Shuvalovite	Svv	Spurrite	Spu	Studtite	Stu
Safflorite	Saf	Schreyerite	Sry	Sibirskite	Sib	Srebrodolskite	Sre	Stumpflite	Stm
Sahamalite-(Ce)	Shm-Ce	Schröckingerite	Srö	Sicherite	Sic	Šreinite	Šrn	Sturmanite	Strm
Sahlinite	Sah	Schubnelite	Shb	Sicklerite	Sik	Srilankite	Sri	Stützite	Stz
Sailaufite	Slf	Schuetteite	Sh	Siderazot	Saz	Stalderite	Sld	Suanite	Sua
Sainfeldite	Sai	Schuilingite-(Nd)	Shg-Nd	Siderite	Sd	Staněkite	Stk	Sudburyite	Sdb
Sakhaite	Skh	Schulenbergite	Slb	Sideronatrite	Snat	Stanfieldite	Stf	Sudoite	Sud
Sakuraiite	Sak	Schüllerite	Shü	Siderophyllite	Sid	Stangersite	Sgs	Sudovikovite	Svi
Salammoniac	Sam	Schultenite	Slt	Siderotil	Sdt	Stanleyite	Stl	Suenoite	Sue
Saléeite	Slé	Schumacherite	Shh	Sidorenkite	Sdo	Stannite	Stn	Suessite	Sss
Salesite	Sls	Schwartzembergite	Swb	Sidpietersite	Sdp	Stannoidite	Sta	Sugakiite	Sgk
Saliotite	Sal	Schwertmannite	Swm	Sidwillite	Sdw	Stannopalladinite	Spdn	Sugilite	Sug
Saltonseaite	Sts	Sclarite	Sl	Siegenite	Seg	Starkeyite	Ske	Suhailite	Suh
Salzburgite	Szb	Scolecite	Slc	Sieleckiite	Sie	Staročeskéite	Sčk	Sulfhydrylbystrite	Shbys
Samaniite	Smn	Scordariite	Sda	Sigloite	Sig	Starovaite	Sro	Sulfoborite	Sbo
Samarskite-(Y)	Smk-Y	Scorodite	Scd	Siidraite	Sii	Staurolite	St	Sulphohalite	Slhl
Samarskite-(Yb)	Smk-Yb	Scorticoite	Srt	Silesiaite	Ssa	Stavelotite-(La)	Svt-La	Sulphotsumoite	Stsm
Samfowlerite	Sfw	Scorzalite	Scz	Silhydrite	Shy	Steacyite	Scy	Sulphur	S
Sampleite	Smp	Scotlandite	Sct	Silicocarnotite	Scnt	Steedeite	Sed	Sulphur-β	S-β
Samraite	Samr	Scottyite	Sty	Silicon	Si	Steenstrupine-(Ce)	Ssp-Ce	Sulvanite	Sul
Samsonite	Ssn	Scrutinyite	Sny	Silinaite	Sln	Stefanweissite	Swi	Sundiusite	Sun
Samuelsonite	Sms	Seaborgite	Sea	Sillénite	Sén	Steigerite	Sgr	Suolunite	Suo
Sanbornite	Sabn	Seamanite	Sem	Sillimanite	Sil	Steinhardtite	Shd	Suredaite	Su
Sanderite	Sdr	Searlesite	Sle	Silver (argentum)	Ag	Steinmetzite	Snm	Surinamite	Sum
Saneroite	Snr	Sederholmite	Sdh	Silvialite	Slv	Steklite	Sek	Surite	Sur
Sangenaroite	Sgar	Sedovite	Sdv	Simferite	Smf	Stellerite	Ste	Sursassite	Ss
Sanguite	Sgu	Seeligerite	Sli	Simmonsite	Sim	Stenhuggarite	Shu	Susannite	Sus
Sanidine	Sa	Seelite	See	Simonellite	Sne	Stenonite	Sten	Suseinargiuite	Sag
Sanjuanite	Sjn	Segelerite	Sgl	Simonite	Smo	Stepanovite	Stpn	Sussexite	Ssx
Sanmartinite	Sma	Segerstromite	Ssr	Simonkolleite	Skl	Stephanite	Sph	Suzukiite	Suz
Sanrománite	Srm	Segnitite	Sgt	Simplotite	Spo	Štěpite	Ště	Svabite	Sva
Santabarbaraite	Sbb	Seidite-(Ce)	Sei-Ce	Simpsonite	Spn	Stercorite	Stc	Svanbergite	Svb
Santaclaraite	Scl	Seidozerite	Sdz	Sincosite	Scs	Stergiouite	Sgo	Sveinbergeite	Sve
Santafeite	Sfe	Seifertite	Sft	Sinhalite	Shl	Sterlinghillite	Slg	Sveite	Sv
Santanaite	San	Seinäjokite	Sjk	Sinjarite	Snj	Sternbergite	Srn	Švenekite	Švn
Santarosaite	Srs	Sejkoraite-(Y)	Sej-Y	Sinkankasite	Ska	Steropesite	Strp	Sverigeite	Svg
Santite	Snt	Sekaninaite	Skn	Sinnerite	Sin	Sterryite	Srr	Svetlanaite	Svl
Saponite	Sap	Selenium	Se	Sinoite	Sno	Stetefeldtite	Sf	Svornostite	Svo
Sapozhnikovite	Spz	Selenojalpaite	Sjal	Sitinakite	Sit	Stetindite-(Ce)	Std-Ce	Svyatoslavite	Svy
Sapphirine	Spr	Selenolaurite	Slrt	Siudaite	Siu	Steudelite	Stdl	Svyazhinite	Svz
Sarabauite	Sbu	Selenopolybasite	Splb	Siwaqaite	Siw	Stevensite	Stv	Swaknoite	Swk
Saranchinaite	Src	Selenostephanite	Ssph	Skaergaardite	Skg	Steverustite	Svr	Swamboite-(Nd)	Swa-Nd
Saranovskite	Svs	Seligmannite	Seli	Skinnerite	Ski	Stewartite	Stw	Swartzite	Swz
Sarcolite	Sco	Selivanovaite	Svn	Skippenite	Skp	Stibarsen	Sbr	Swedenborgite	Swe
Sarcopside	Sar	Sellaite	Sel	Sklodowskite	Sds	Stibiconite	Sbc	Sweetite	Sw
Sardignaite	Sdi	Selwynite	Swy	Skorpionite	Skr	Stibioclaudetite	Scld	Swinefordite	Sfd
Sarkinite	Srk	Semenovite-(Ce)	Smv-Ce	Skutterudite	Skt	Stibiocolumbite	Sclb	Switzerite	Swt
Sarmientite	Smi	Semseyite	Ssy	Slavíkite	Sví	Stibiocolusite	Sclu	Sylvanite	Syv
Sarrabusite	Sbs	Senaite	Sna	Slavkovite	Sav	Stibiogoldfieldite	Sbgf	Sylvite	Syl
Sartorite	Sat	Senarmontite	Sen	Slawsonite	Sws	Stibiopalladinite	Stpdn	Symesite	Sy
Saryarkite-(Y)	Syk-Y	Senegalite	Sng	Šlikite	Šlk	Stibiotantalite	Sttl	Symplesite	Sym
Sasaite	Sas	Sengierite	Sgi	Sluzhenikinite	Szhi	Stibivanite	Stbv	Synadelphite	Syd
Sassolite	Sso	Senkevichite	Sev	Smamite	Smm	Stibnite	Sbn	Synchysite-(Ce)	Syn-Ce
Satimolite	Sati	Sepiolite	Sep	Smectite	Sme	Stichtite	Stt	Synchysite-(Nd)	Syn-Nd
Satpaevite	Spv	Serandite	Srd	Smirnite	Smr	Stilbite-Ca	Stb-Ca	Synchysite-(Y)	Syn-Y
Satterlyite	Sly	Serendibite	Ser	Smirnovskite	Snv	Stilbite-Na	Stb-Na	Syngenite	Sgn
Sauconite	Sau	Sergeevite	Sge	Smithite	Sth	Stilleite	Sll	Szaibélyite	Sza
Sayrite	Syr	Sergevanite	Sgv	Smithsonite	Smt	Stillwaterite	Slw	Szenicsite	Sze
Sazhinite-(Ce)	Szi-Ce	Sergeysmirnovite	Ssv	Smolyaninovite	Sya	Stillwellite-(Ce)	Swl-Ce	Szklaryite	Sky
Sazhinite-(La)	Szi-La	Serpentine	Srp	Smrkovecite	Skc	Stilpnomelane	Stp	Szmikite	Szm
Sazykinaite-(Y)	Szn-Y	Serpierite	Spe	Smythite	Syt	Stishovite	Sti	Szomolnokite	Szo
Sbacchiite	Scc	Serrabrancaite	Sra	Sobolevite	Sob	Stistaite	Sst	Szymańskiite	Szy
Sborgite	Srg	Sewardite	Sew	Sobolevskite	Sov	Stöfflerite	Sff		
Scacchite	Sca	Shabaite-(Nd)	Sbt-Nd	Sodalite	Sdl	Stoiberite	Sbe		
Scainiite	Scn	Shabynite	Sby	Soddyite	Sod	Stokesite	Sks		
Scandiobabingtonite	Sbab	Shadlunite	Slu	Sofiite	Sof	Stolperite	Slp		
Scapolite	Scp	Shafranovskite	Sfn	Sogdianite	Sog	Stolzite	Sz		
Scarbroite	Scr	Shagamite	Sgm	Söhngeite	Söh	Stoppaniite	Spp		
Scawtite	Scw	Shakhdaraite-(Y)	Skd-Y	Sokolovaite	Sok	Stottite	Sto		
Schachnerite	Shn	Shakhovite	Sk	Solongoite	Sol	Stracherite	Stra		
Schafarzikite	Sfz	Shandite	Snd	Somersetite	Sse	Straczekite	Szk		
Schäferite	Sfr	Shannonite	Snn	Sonolite	Snl	Strakhovite	Skhv		
Schairerite	Shr	Sharpite	Shp	Sonoraite	Son	Stranskiite	Ssk		
Schallerite	Slr	Sharyginite	Syg	Sopcheite	Sop	Strashimirite	Ssh		
Schapbachite	Spb	Shasuite	Shs	Sorbyite	Srb	Strätlingite	Srä		
Schaurteite	Sht	Shattuckite	Sha	Sørensenite	Sør	Straβmannite	Sβm		
Scheelite	Sch	Shcherbakovite	Sbk	Sorosite	Sor	Strelkinite	Slk		
Schertelite	She	Shcherbinaite	Shc	Sosedkoite	Sos	Strengite	Stg		
Scheuchzerite	Shz	Shchurovskyite	Svk	Součekite	Sče	Stringhamite	Sgh		
Schiavinatoite	Shv	Sheldrickite	Sdk	Souzalite	Sou	Stromeyerite	Smy		
Schieffelinite	Sfl	Shenzhuangite	Szh	Spadaite	Spa	Stronadelphite	Sad		
Schindlerite	Shi	Sherwoodite	Swd	Spaltiite	Spti	Stronalsite	Sns		
Schizolite	Szl	Shibkovite	Sko	Spangolite	Spg	Strontianite	Str		
Schlegelite	Scg	Shigaite	Sga	Spencerite	Scrt	Strontioborite	Srbo		
Schlemaite	Slm	Shilovite	Shil	Sperrylite	Spy	Strontiochevkinite	Scvk		
Schlossmacherite	Ssm	Shimazakiite	Smz	Spertiniite	Sni	Strontiodresserite	Sdrs		
Schlüterite-(Y)	Slü-Y	Shinkolobweite	Skw	Spessartine	Sps	Strontiofluorite	Sflr		
Schmidite	Smd	Shirokshinite	Shk	Sphaerobertrandite	Sbtd	Strontioginorite	Sgnr		
Schmiederite	Scm	Shirozulite	Szu	Sphaerobismoite	Sbm	Strontiohurlbutite	Shrb		
Schmitterite	Sci	Shkatulkalite	Skk	Sphalerite	Sp	Strontiojoaquinite	Sjq		
Schneebergite	Snb	Shlykovite	Skv	Spheniscidite	Snc	Strontiomelane	Sml		

== T ==
Name	Symbol	Name	Symbol	Name	Symbol	Name	Symbol	Name	Symbol	Name	Symbol	Name	Symbol
Tacharanite	Tch	Tatyanaite	Tty	Tetrahedrite-(Ni)	Ttr-Ni	Tilleyite	Tly	Tosudite	Tos	Tsepinite-Ca	Tsp-Ca	Tyrrellite	Ty
Tachyhydrite	Thy	Tausonite	Tau	Tetrahedrite-(Zn)	Ttr-Zn	Tillmannsite	Till	Toturite	Tot	Tsepinite-K	Tsp-K	Tyuyamunite	Tyu
Tadzhikite-(Ce)	Tad-Ce	Tavagnascoite	Tvg	Tetrarooseveltite	Troo	Timroseite	Tim	Tounkite	Tou	Tsepinite-Na	Tsp-Na		
Taenite	Tae	Tavorite	Tav	Tetrataenite	Ttae	Tin (stannum)	Sn	Tourmaline	Tur	Tsepinite-Sr	Tsp-Sr		
Taikanite	Tka	Tazheranite	Taz	Tetrawickmanite	Twm	Tinaksite	Tnk	Townendite	Twn	Tsikourasite	Tsi		
Taimyrite-I	Tmy-I	Tazieffite	Tzf	Tewite	Tw	Tincalconite	Tnc	Toyohaite	To	Tsilaisite	Tsl		
Tainiolite	Tai	Tazzoliite	Tzo	Thadeuite	Thd	Tinnunculite	Tnn	Trabzonite	Trb	Tsnigriite	Tng		
Taipingite-(Ce)	Tpg-Ce	Teallite	Tel	Thalcusite	Thl	Tinsleyite	Tin	Tranquillityite	Trq	Tsugaruite	Tsg		
Takanawaite-(Y)	Tkw-Y	Tedhadleyite	Ted	Thalénite-(Y)	Tlé-Y	Tinticite	Ttc	Transjordanite	Tjrd	Tsumcorite	Tmc		
Takanelite	Tkn	Teepleite	Tee	Thalfenisite	Tfn	Tintinaite	Tti	Traskite	Tsk	Tsumebite	Tsu		
Takedaite	Tkd	Tegengrenite	Teg	Thalhammerite	Tha	Tinzenite	Tnz	Trattnerite	Tra	Tsumgallite	Tgl		
Takéuchiite	Tké	Teineite	Tei	Thalliomelane	Tml	Tiptopite	Tpt	Treasurite	Tsur	Tsumoite	Tsm		
Takovite	Tkv	Telargpalite	Tlp	Thalliumpharmacosiderite	Tpsd	Tiragalloite	Tga	Trébeurdenite	Tré	Tsygankoite	Tsy		
Talc	Tlc	Tellurantimony	Tea	Thaumasite	Tma	Tischendorfite	Tdf	Trebiskyite	Tbk	Tubulite	Tub		
Talmessite	Tlm	Tellurite	Tlr	Thebaite-(NH4)	Thb-NH_{4}	Tisinalite	Tis	Trechmannite	Trh	Tučekite	Tuč		
Talnakhite	Tlk	Tellurium	Te	Theisite	Ths	Tissintite	Tss	Tredouxite	Tdx	Tugarinovite	Tug		
Tamaite	Tam	Tellurobismuthite	Tbi	Thénardite	Thn	Tistarite	Tta	Trembathite	Tba	Tugtupite	Ttp		
Tamarugite	Tmr	Tellurohauchecornite	Thau	Theoparacelsite	Thp	Titanite	Ttn	Tremolite	Tr	Tuhualite	Tuh		
Tamboite	Tmb	Telluromandarinoite	Tmda	Theophrastite	Tph	Titanium	Ti	Trevorite	Trv	Tuite	Tu		
Tamuraite	Tmu	Telluronevskite	Tnvk	Therasiaite	The	Titanoholtite	Thlt	Triangulite	Tri	Tulameenite	Tul		
Tancaite-(Ce)	Tca-Ce	Telluropalladinite	Tpdn	Thérèsemagnanite	Tmg	Titanomaghemite	Tmgh	Triazolite	Tzl	Tuliokite	Tli		
Tancoite	Tco	Telluroperite	Tpr	Thermaerogenite	Tag	Titanowodginite	Twdg	Tridymite	Trd	Tululite	Tlu		
Taneyamalite	Tny	Telyushenkoite	Tys	Thermessaite	Tms	Titantaramellite	Ttmel	Trigonite	Tgn	Tumchaite	Tum		
Tangdanite	Tdn	Temagamite	Tem	Thermessaite-(NH_{4})	Tms-NH_{4}	Tivanite	Tiv	Trikalsilite	Tks	Tundrite-(Ce)	Tnd-Ce		
Tangeite	Tg	Tengchongite	Tcg	Thermonatrite	Tnat	Tlalocite	Tla	Trilithionite	Tln	Tundrite-(Nd)	Tnd-Nd		
Taniajacoite	Tjc	Tengerite-(Y)	Ten-Y	Thomasclarkite-(Y)	Tcl-Y	Tlapallite	Tpl	Trimerite	Tme	Tunellite	Tnl		
Tanohataite	Tnh	Tennantite-(Cu)	Tnt-Cu	Thometzekite	Tmz	Tobelite	Tbl	Trimounsite-(Y)	Tmo-Y	Tungsten (wolfram)	W		
Tantalaeschynite-(Y)	Taes-Y	Tennantite-(Fe)	Tnt-Fe	Thomsenolite	Tse	Tobermorite	Tbm	Trinepheline	Tnph	Tungstenite	Tgt		
Tantalcarbide	Tcb	Tennantite-(Hg)	Tnt-Hg	Thomsonite-Ca	Thm-Ca	Tochilinite	Thi	Triphylite	Trp	Tungstibite	Tsb		
Tantalite-(Fe)	Ttl-Fe	Tennantite-(Ni)	Tnt-Ni	Thomsonite-Sr	Thm-Sr	Tocornalite	Toc	Triplite	Trl	Tungstite	Tgs		
Tantalite-(Mg)	Ttl-Mg	Tennantite-(Zn)	Tnt-Zn	Thorasphite	Tp	Todorokite	Tdr	Triploidite	Tpd	Tungusite	Tgu		
Tantalite-(Mn)	Ttl-Mn	Tenorite	Tnr	Thorbastnäsite	Tbsn	Tokkoite	Tok	Trippkeite	Tpk	Tunisite	Tun		
Tantalowodginite	Ttwdg	Tephroite	Tep	Thoreaulite	Tre	Tokyoite	Tky	Tripuhyite	Tpy	Tuperssuatsiaite	Tup		
Tanteuxenite-(Y)	Ttx-Y	Terlinguacreekite	Tck	Thorianite	Tho	Tolbachite	Tbc	Tristramite	Ttm	Turanite	Trn		
Tantite	Tan	Terlinguaite	Tlg	Thorikosite	Thk	Tolovkite	Tol	Tritomite-(Ce)	Tto-Ce	Turkestanite	Tkt		
Tapiaite	Tpi	Ternesite	Tns	Thorite	Thr	Tomamaeite	Tmm	Tritomite-(Y)	Tto-Y	Turneaureite	Trr		
Tapiolite-(Fe)	Tap-Fe	Ternovite	Tno	Thornasite	Tna	Tomichite	Tom	Trögerite	Tge	Turquoise	Tqu		
Tapiolite-(Mn)	Tap-Mn	Terranovaite	Tnv	Thorneite	Tne	Tomiolloite	Tlo	Trogtalite	Trg	Turtmannite	Tt		
Taramellite	Tmel	Terrywallaceite	Twl	Thorosteenstrupine	Tssp	Tondiite	Ton	Troilite	Tro	Tuscanite	Tus		
Taramite	Trm	Terskite	Ter	Thortveitite	Tvt	Tongbaite	Tgb	Trolleite	Tll	Tusionite	Tsn		
Taranakite	Tar	Tertschite	Trt	Thorutite	Thu	Tooeleite	Toe	Trona	Tn	Tuzlaite	Tuz		
Tarapacáite	Tpc	Teruggite	Tgg	Threadgoldite	Tdg	Topaz	Tpz	Truscottite	Tst	Tvalchrelidzeite	Tva		
Tarbagataite	Tbg	Teschemacherite	Tmh	Thunderbayite	Tby	Topsøeite	Top	Trüstedtite	Trü	Tvedalite	Tve		
Tarbuttite	Tbt	Tetra-auricupride	Taur	Tiberiobardiite	Tbd	Torbernite	Tor	Tsangpoite	Tpo	Tveitite-(Y)	Ttt-Y		
Tarkianite	Trk	Tetradymite	Ttd	Tiemannite	Tmn	Törnebohmite-(Ce)	Tbh-Ce	Tsaregorodtsevite	Tsa	Tvrdýite	Tvr		
Taseqite	Tsq	Tetraferriannite	Tfann	Tienshanite	Tsh	Törnebohmite-(La)	Tbh-La	Tschaunerite	Tsc	Tweddillite	Twe		
Tashelgite	Thg	Tetraferriphlogopite	Tfphl	Tiettaite	Tie	Törnroosite	Trs	Tschermakite	Tsr	Twinnite	Twi		
Tassieite	Tas	Tetraferroplatinum	Tfpt	Tikhonenkovite	Tik	Torrecillasite	Trc	Tschermigite	Tmi	Tychite	Tyc		
Tatarinovite	Tat	Tetrahedrite-(Fe)	Ttr-Fe	Tilasite	Til	Torreyite	Try	Tschernichite	Tni	Tyretskite	Tyr		
Tatarskite	Tts	Tetrahedrite-(Hg)	Ttr-Hg	Tilkerodeite	Tkr	Torryweiserite	Tyw	Tschörtnerite	Tht	Tyrolite	Tyl		

== U ==
Name	Symbol	Name	Symbol	Name	Symbol	Name	Symbol	Name	Symbol	Name	Symbol
Uakitite	Uak	Ulvöspinel	Uspl	Uralolite	Url	Uranopolycrase	Uplc	Urvantsevite	Urv	Uytenbogaardtite	Uyt
Uchucchacuaite	Uch	Umangite	Um	Uramarsite	Uaa	Uranosilite	Usi	Ushkovite	Ukv	Uzonite	Uzn
Udinaite	Udn	Umbite	Umb	Uramphite	Uap	Uranospathite	Ush	Usovite	Usv		
Uduminelite	Udm	Umbozerite	Ubz	Urancalcarite	Uca	Uranosphaerite	Us	Ussingite	Usg		
Uedaite-(Ce)	Ued-Ce	Umbrianite	Ubn	Uraninite	Urn	Uranospinite	Usp	Ustarasite	Utr		
Uklonskovite	Ukl	Umohoite	Umo	Uranocircite-II	Urc-II	Uranotungstite	Utgs	Usturite	Ust		
Ulexite	Ulx	Ungavaite	Ugv	Uranoclite	Uro	Urea	Ur	Utahite	Uta		
Ulfanderssonite-(Ce)	Ulf-Ce	Ungemachite	Ugm	Uranophane-α	Urp-α	Uricite	Uri	Uvanite	Uvn		
Ullmannite	Ull	Upalite	Upa	Uranophane-β	Urp-β	Uroxite	Urx	Uvarovite	Uv		
Ulrichite	Ulr	Uralborite	Ubo	Uranopilite	Up	Urusovite	Uusv	Uvite	Uvt		

== V ==
Name	Symbol	Name	Symbol	Name	Symbol	Name	Symbol	Name	Symbol
Vaesite	Va	Vanthoffite	Vhf	Verbierite	Vbr	Vinciennite	Vcn	Voloshinite	Vls
Vajdakite	Vaj	Vanuralite	Vnr	Vergasovaite	Vgs	Vinogradovite	Vgd	Voltaite	Vlt
Valentinite	Vln	Vapnikite	Vpn	Vermiculite	Vrm	Violarite	Vio	Volynskite	Vol
Valleriite	Val	Varennesite	Vrn	Vernadite	Vnd	Virgilite	Vir	Vonbezingite	Vbz
Valleyite	Vly	Vargite	Vg	Verneite	Ver	Vishnevite	Vhn	Vonsenite	Von
Vanackerite	Vnk	Variscite	Var	Verplanckite	Vpk	Vismirnovite	Vis	Vorlanite	Vrl
Vanadinite	Vna	Varlamoffite	Vlm	Versiliaite	Vsl	Vistepite	Vtp	Voronkovite	Vrk
Vanadiocarpholite	Vcar	Varulite	Vr	Vertumnite	Vtn	Viteite	Vit	Vorontsovite	Vor
Vanadio-oxy-chromium-dravite	Vocdrv	Vashegyite	Vhg	Veselovskýite	Vlv	Vitimite	Vti	Voudourisite	Vou
Vanadio-oxy-dravite	Vodrv	Vasilite	Vs	Vésigniéite	Vsg	Vittinkiite	Vtk	Vozhminite	Voz
Vanadio-pargasite	Vprg	Vasilseverginite	Vas	Vestaite	Vst	Vitusite-(Ce)	Vtu-Ce	Vránaite	Vrá
Vanadium	V	Vasilyevite	Vsy	Vesuvianite	Ves	Vivianite	Viv	Vrbaite	Vrb
Vanadoallanite-(La)	Valn-La	Västmanlandite-(Ce)	Vml-Ce	Veszelyite	Vsz	Vladimirite	Vld	Vuagnatite	Vgn
Vanadoandrosite-(Ce)	Vda-Ce	Vaterite	Vtr	Viaeneite	Via	Vladimirivanovite	Vla	Vulcanite	Vul
Vanadomalayaite	Vmly	Vaughanite	Vgh	Vicanite-(Ce)	Vic-Ce	Vladkrivovichevite	Vkv	Vuonnemite	Vn
Vanalite	Vnl	Vauquelinite	Vql	Vigezzite	Vgz	Vladykinite	Vdy	Vuorelainenite	Vuo
Vanarsite	Vns	Vauxite	Vx	Vigrishinite	Vig	Vlasovite	Vsv	Vuoriyarvite-K	Vyv-K
Vandenbrandeite	Vbd	Vavřínite	Vav	Vihorlatite	Vih	Vlodavetsite	Vlo	Vurroite	Vur
Vandendriesscheite	Vdd	Väyrynenite	Väy	Viitaniemiite	Vtm	Vochtenite	Voc	Vyacheslavite	Vya
Vanderheydenite	Vhy	Veatchite	Vea	Vikingite	Vkg	Voggite	Vog	Vyalsovite	Vyl
Vandermeerscheite	Vme	Veblenite	Veb	Villamanínite	Vil	Voglite	Vgl	Vymazalováite	Vym
Vaniniite	Vnn	Veenite	Vee	Villiaumite	Vll	Volaschioite	Vsh	Vysokýite	Vys
Vanmeersscheite	Vms	Velikite	Vel	Villyaellenite	Vy	Volborthite	Vbo	Vysotskite	Vsk
Vanoxite	Vnx	Vendidaite	Ven	Vimsite	Vim	Volkonskoite	Vkn	Vyuntspakhkite-(Y)	Vyu-Y
Vantasselite	Vts	Verbeekite	Vbk	Vincentite	Vin	Volkovskite	Vlk		

== W ==
Name	Symbol	Name	Symbol	Name	Symbol	Name	Symbol	Name	Symbol	Name	Symbol
Wadalite	Wdl	Wardsmithite	Wsm	Weissite	Wst	Whiteite-(MnMnMn)	Wt-MnMnMn	Wiluite	Wil	Wulffite	Wlf
Wadeite	Wad	Warikahnite	War	Welinite	Wln	Whiterockite	Wrc	Winchite	Wnc	Wülfingite	Wfg
Wadsleyite	Wds	Warkite	Wki	Weloganite	Wlg	Whitlockite	Wht	Windhoekite	Whk	Wumuite	Wum
Wagnerite	Wag	Warwickite	Wwk	Welshite	Wel	Whitmoreite	Whm	Windmountainite	Wmt	Wupatkiite	Wup
Waimirite-(Y)	Wai-Y	Wassonite	Was	Wendwilsonite	Wdw	Wickenburgite	Wbu	Winstanleyite	Wsn	Wurtzite	Wur
Waipouaite	Wpo	Watanabeite	Wa	Wenjiite	Wnj	Wickmanite	Wm	Wiserite	Wis	Wüstite	Wüs
Wairakite	Wrk	Watatsumiite	Wts	Wenkite	Wen	Wicksite	Wic	Witherite	Wth	Wuyanzhiite	Wuy
Wairauite	Wra	Waterhouseite	Whs	Werdingite	Wrd	Widenmannite	Wdm	Wittichenite	Wtc	Wyartite	Wya
Wakabayashilite	Wak	Watkinsonite	Wat	Wermlandite	Wld	Widgiemoolthalite	Wmo	Wittite	Wit	Wycheproofite	Wyc
Wakefieldite-(Ce)	Wf-Ce	Wattersite	Wte	Wernerbaurite	Wbr	Wightmanite	Wmn	Witzkeite	Wzk	Wyllieite	Wyl
Wakefieldite-(La)	Wf-La	Wattevilleite	Wtv	Wernerkrauseite	Wkr	Wiklundite	Wik	Wodginite	Wdg		
Wakefieldite-(Nd)	Wf-Nd	Wavellite	Wav	Wesselsite	Wes	Wilancookite	Wck	Wöhlerite	Wöh		
Wakefieldite-(Y)	Wf-Y	Wawayandaite	Waw	Westerveldite	Wvd	Wilcoxite	Wcx	Wolfeite	Wol		
Walentaite	Wlt	Waylandite	Way	Wetherillite	Wet	Wildcatite	Wct	Wollastonite	Wo		
Walfordite	Wfd	Wayneburnhamite	Wbh	Wheatleyite	Wty	Wildenauerite	Wda	Wölsendorfite	Wsd		
Walkerite	Wk	Weberite	Web	Whelanite	Wla	Wilhelmgümbelite	Wgü	Wonesite	Wns		
Wallisite	Wal	Weddellite	Wed	Wherryite	Whr	Wilhelmkleinite	Wkl	Woodallite	Wod		
Wallkilldellite	Wlk	Weeksite	Wks	Whewellite	Whe	Wilhelmramsayite	Wrm	Woodhouseite	Wdh		
Wallkilldellite-(Fe)	Wlk-Fe	Wegscheiderite	Weg	Whitecapsite	Wcp	Wilhelmvierlingite	Wvl	Woodruffite	Wdr		
Walpurgite	Wpg	Weibullite	Wbl	Whiteite-(CaFeMg)	Wt-CaFeMg	Wilkinsonite	Wkn	Woodwardite	Wwd		
Walstromite	Ws	Weilerite	Wlr	Whiteite-(CaMgMg)	Wt-CaMgMg	Wilkmanite	Wkm	Wooldridgeite	Woo		
Walthierite	Wtr	Weilite	Wei	Whiteite-(CaMnMg)	Wt-CaMnMg	Willemite	Wlm	Wopmayite	Wop		
Wampenite	Wpn	Weinebeneite	Wbn	Whiteite-(CaMnMn)	Wt-CaMnMn	Willemseite	Wls	Wrightite	Wgh		
Wangdaodeite	Wdd	Weishanite	Whn	Whiteite-(MnFeMg)	Wt-MnFeMg	Willhendersonite	Whd	Wroewolfeite	Wwf		
Wardite	Wd	Weissbergite	Wsb	Whiteite-(MnMnMg)	Wt-MnMnMg	Willyamite	Wly	Wulfenite	Wul		

== X ==
Name	Symbol	Name	Symbol	Name	Symbol	Name	Symbol
Xanthiosite	Xth	Xenotime-(Yb)	Xtm-Yb	Ximengite	Xim	Xonotlite	Xon
Xanthoconite	Xcn	Xiangjiangite	Xjg	Xingzhongite	Xin	Xuite	Xu
Xanthoxenite	Xox	Xieite	Xi	Xitieshanite	Xit		
Xenophyllite	Xp	Xifengite	Xif	Xocolatlite	Xoc		
Xenotime-(Y)	Xtm-Y	Xilingolite	Xil	Xocomecatlite	Xco		

== Y ==
Name	Symbol	Name	Symbol
Yafsoanite	Yaf	Yoderite	Yod
Yagiite	Yag	Yofortierite	Yof
Yakhontovite	Ykh	Yoshimuraite	Ysh
Yakovenchukite-(Y)	Yak-Y	Yoshiokaite	Yos
Yakubovichite	Ybv	Yttriaite-(Y)	Yt-Y
Yancowinnaite	Ycw	Yttrialite-(Y)	Ytt-Y
Yangite	Ygi	Yttrocolumbite-(Y)	Yclb-Y
Yangzhumingite	Yzh	Yttrocrasite-(Y)	Ycr-Y
Yanomamite	Yan	Yttrotantalite-(Y)	Yttl-Y
Yarlongite	Ylg	Yttrotungstite-(Ce)	Ytgs-Ce
Yaroshevskite	Yro	Yttrotungstite-(Y)	Ytgs-Y
Yaroslavite	Ysl	Yuanfuliite	Yfl
Yarrowite	Yar	Yuanjiangite	Yjg
Yarzhemskiite	Yzm	Yugawaralite	Yug
Yavapaiite	Yav	Yukonite	Yuk
Yazganite	Yaz	Yuksporite	Yks
Yeatmanite	Ytm	Yurgensonite	Ygs
Yecoraite	Yec	Yurmarinite	Ymr
Yedlinite	Yed	Yushkinite	Yus
Ye'elimite	Ye	Yusupovite	Ypv
Yegorovite	Yeg	Yuzuxiangite	Yuz
Yeomanite	Yeo	Yvonite	Yv
Yimengite	Yim		
Yingjiangite	Yin		
Yixunite	Yix		

== Z ==
Name	Symbol	Name	Symbol	Name	Symbol	Name	Symbol	Name	Symbol
Żabińskiite	Żbk	Zeravshanite	Zer	Zincohögbomite-2N2S	Zhög-2N2S	Zircosulfate	Zrs	Zwieselite	Zwi
Zabuyelite	Zab	Zeunerite	Zeu	Zincohögbomite-2N6S	Zhög-2N6S	Zirkelite	Zke	Zýkaite	Zýk
Zaccagnaite	Zac	Zhanghengite	Zhg	Zincolibethenite	Zlib	Zirklerite	Zkl		
Zaccariniite	Zcr	Zhanghuifenite	Zhf	Zincolivenite	Zoli	Zirsilite-(Ce)	Zir-Ce		
Zadovite	Zad	Zhangpeishanite	Zph	Zincomenite	Znm	Zirsinalite	Zsl		
Zagamiite	Zag	Zharchikhite	Zha	Zinconigerite-2N1S	Zng-2N1S	Zlatogorite	Zla		
Zaherite	Zah	Zhemchuzhnikovite	Zhe	Zinconigerite-6N6S	Zng-6N6S	Znamenskyite	Zms		
Zaïrite	Zaï	Zhiqinite	Zhi	Zincospiroffite	Zspf	Znucalite	Znu		
Zakharovite	Zak	Ziesite	Zie	Zincostaurolite	Zst	Zodacite	Zod		
Zálesíite	Zál	Zigrasite	Zig	Zincostrunzite	Zstz	Zoharite	Zoh		
Zanazziite	Zan	Zimbabweite	Zbb	Zincovelesite-6N6S	Zcv-6N6S	Zoisite	Zo		
Zangboite	Zgb	Ziminaite	Zim	Zincovoltaite	Zvlt	Zoisite-(Pb)	Zo-Pb		
Zapatalite	Zap	Zinc	Zn	Zincowoodwardite	Zwwd	Zolenskyite	Zsk		
Zaratite	Zar	Zincalstibite	Zas	Zincrosasite	Zrss	Zolotarevite	Zlo		
Zavalíaite	Zvl	Zincaluminite	Zna	Zincroselite	Zrsl	Zoltaiite	Zol		
Zavaritskite	Zav	Zincgartrellite	Zgtl	Zincsilite	Zs	Zorite	Zor		
Zaykovite	Zay	Zincite	Znc	Zinczippeite	Zzip	Zoubekite	Zou		
Zdenĕkite	Zde	Zinclipscombite	Zlcb	Zinkenite	Zkn	Zubkovaite	Zub		
Zektzerite	Zek	Zincmelanterite	Zmln	Zinkgruvanite	Zgv	Zugshunstite-(Ce)	Zug-Ce		
Zellerite	Zel	Zincoberaunite	Zbru	Zinkosite	Zin	Zuktamrurite	Zuk		
Zemannite	Zem	Zincobotryogen	Zbyg	Zinnwaldite	Znw	Zunyite	Zun		
Zemkorite	Zmk	Zincobradaczekite	Zbdc	Zippeite	Zip	Zussmanite	Zus		
Zenzénite	Zen	Zincobriartite	Zbtt	Zircon	Zrn	Zvĕstovite-(Zn)	Zvĕ-Zn		
Zeolite	Zeo	Zincochromite	Zchr	Zirconolite	Zrc	Zvyaginite	Zvy		
Zeophyllite	Zp	Zincocopiapite	Zcpi	Zircophyllite	Zcp	Zvyagintsevite	Zv		

== Additional symbols ==
Newsletters
2021		2022		2023	
Name	Symbol	Name	Symbol	Name	Symbol
Aldomarinoite	Aldm	Calcioancylite-(La)	Canc-La	Hokkaidoite	Hkd
Alicewilsonite-(YLa)	Aws-YLa	Cubothioplumbite	Ctpb	Nacareniobsite-(Y)	Nns-Y
Beershevaite	Bee	Ferrofettelite	Fftt	Wortupaite	Wor
Betzite	Bzt	Franksousaite	Fns	Ginelfite	Glf
Bortolanite	Btln	Hexathioplumbite	Htpb	Wangpuite	Wpu
Branchite	Bran	Mariakrite	Mari		
Calciohatertite	Chtt	Tetrahedrite-(Mn)	Ttr-Mn		
Colomeraite	Colo	Arsenoveszelyite	Avsz		
Cuprodongchuanite	Cdc	Rudolfhermannite	Rhr		
Dewitite	Dwt	Magnesio-ferri-hornblende	Mfhbl		
Dondoellite	Ddl	Nafeasite	Nfa		
Dongchuanite	Dc	Amgaite	Amgt		
Erssonite	Eso	Shinarumpite	Sru		
Ferri-taramite	Fi-trm	Carbocalumite	Cbcl		
Ferroberaunite	Fbru	Paradimorphite	Pdim		
Ferrotorryweiserite	Ftyw	Murphyite	Mpy		
Flaggite	Flg	Deynekoite	Dnk		
Gachingite	Gac	Poellmannite	Poe		
Gismondine-Ca	Gis-Ca	Griffinite	Gfn		
Gismondine-Sr	Gis-Sr	Magnéliite	Mnli		
Goldhillite	Gdh	Magganasite	Mgg		
Gurzhiite	Grz	Elliottite	Eli		
Håleniusite-(Ce)	Hål-Ce	Sigismundite (reinstated)			
Håleniusite-(Ce)	Hål-Ce	Arsenoveszelyite	Avsz		
Höslite	Hös	Rudolhermannite	Rhr		
Hydroredmondite)	Hrdm	Magnesio-ferri-hornblende	Mfhbl		
Igelströmite	Ig	Nafeasite	Nfa		
Illoqite-(Ce)	Ilo-Ce	Amgaite	Amgt		
Jingwenite-(Y)	Jw-Y	Shinarumpite	Sru		
Kangjinlaite	Kjl	Carbocalumite	Cbcl		
Karlditmarite	Kdt	Paradimorphite	Pdim		
Kaznakhtite	Kzt	Murphyite	Mpy		
Kiryuite	Kyu	Deynekoite	Dnk		
Kozłowskiite	Kzu	Poellmannite	Poe		
Lepersonnite-(Nd)	Lps-Nd	Griffinite	Gfn		
Lisanite	Lsa	Magnéliite	Mnli		
Nabateaite	Nbt	Magganasite	Mgg		
Madeiraite	Mde	Elliottite	Eli		
Matthiasweilite	Mtw	Fluorsigaiite	Fsig		
Medvedevite	Mvv	Bounahasite	Bnhs		
Mikecoxite	Mcx	Haywoodite	Hyw		
Nitroplumbite	Npb	Sarrochite	Sarr		
Oberwolfachite	Obw	Kabalovite	Kbv		
Oldsite	Ods	Agentopolybasite-T2ac	Aplb-T2ac		
Ozernovskite	Ozn	Fluorpyromorphite	Fpym		
Ozernovskite	Ozn	Kenorozhdestvenskayaite-(Fe)	Kroz-Fe		
Paulgrothite	Plgr	Oxyyttrobetafite-(Y)	Oyb-Y		
Penriceite	Prc	Loomisite	Lmi		
Pertoldite	Pert	Nazarchukite	Nzr		
Petermegawite	Pmw	Wodegongjieite	Wgj		
Pomite	Pom	Cuprozheshengite	Czh		
Pseudodickthomssenite	Pdth	Tolstykhite	Tls		
Pseudopomite	Ppom	Gysinite-(La)	Gys-La		
Qeltite	Qlt	Scandio-winchite	Swnc		
Radvaniceite	Rad	Chihmingite	Cim		
Redmondite	Rdm	Zheshengite	Zh		
Reznitskyite	Rzs	Hanahanite	Hnh		
Ryabchikovite	Ryb	Ermeloite	Erm		
Samraite	Samr	Ziroite	Zro		
Sapozhnikovite	Spr	Sassite	Ssi		
Savelievaite	Svlv	Raydemarkite	Ryd		
Scenicite	Sce	Cherokeeite	Chrk		
Sergeysmirnovite	Ssv	Pilipenkoite	Plp		
Shasuite	Shs	Tomsquarryite	Tqy		
Shimenite	Shmn	Heimite	Him		
Slyudyankaite	Sdy	Ferro-ferri-holmquistite	Ffhlm		
Steudelite	Stdl	Hayelasdiite	Hyl		
Stibiogoldfieldite	Sbgf	Mazorite	Mzo		
Stibioústalečite	Súč	Louisfuchsite	Lfu		
Sulfatoredmondite	Srdm	Zincochenite	Zche		
Tennantite-(Cd)	Tnt-Cd	Tianhongqiite	Thq		
Tennantite-(Ni)	Tnt-Ni	Selsurtite	Ssu		
Tetrahedrite-(Ni)	Ttr-Ni	Mizraite-(Ce)	Miz-Ce		
Tombstoneite	Tbs	Boojumite	Bjm		
Tomiolloite	Toi	Finescreekite	Fnck		
Xuwenyuanite	Xuw	Kennygayite	Kgy		
Wenjiite	Wnj	Evanichite	Eva		
Whiteite-(MnMnMn)	Wt-MnMnMn	Iskandarovite	Iska		
Zoisite-(Pb)	Zo-Pb	Toledoite	Tld		
		Changesite-(Y)	Cgs-Y		
		Tennantite-(Mn)	Tnt-Mn		
		Hanswilkeite	Hsw		
		Pohlite	Poh		
		Bakakinite	Bkkn		
		Zhengminghuaite	Zmh		
		Shijiangshanite	Sjs		
		Kayupovaite	Kyp		
		Zhenruite	Zhr		
		Chinleite-(Nd)	Chi-Nd		
		Auroselenide	Ause		
		Argentotetrahedrite-(Cd)	Attr-Cd		
		Pendevilleite-(Y)	Pnv-Y		
		Deltanitrogen	δN		
		Trigodomeykite			
		Clinofergusonite-(Y)			
		Clinofergusonite-(Ce)			
		Clinofergusonite-(Nd)			
		Cubo-ice			
		Anorthoroselite			
		Clinosulphur			
		Mertieite			
		Pseudomertieite			
		Uranophane			
		Parauranophane			
		Gersdorffite			
		Paragersdorffite			
		Orthogersdorffite			
		Paralomonosovite			
		Paralammerite			
		Hydronováčekite			
		Nováčekite			
		Halloysite			
		Hydrohalloysite			
		Metauranocircite			
		Taimyrite			
		Uranocircite			
		Quatrandorite			
		Senandorite			
		Borzęckiite	Bzc		
		Nioboixiolite-(Mn^{2+})	Nbix-Mn		
		Ikorskyite	Iko		
		Monazite-(Gd)	Mnz-Gd		
		Bernardevansite	Bev		
		Driekopite	Dkp		
		Alumolukrahnite	Alkr		
		Liangjunite	Lju		
		Cuprodobrovolskyite	Cdvo		
		Chenowethite	Chw		
		Antipovite	Antp		
		Asagiite	Asa		
		Ruizhongite	Rzh		
		Novikovite	Nvi		
		Pengite	Peg		
		Ferro-bosiite	Fbos		
		Zincorietveldite	Zrvd		
		Nickelalumite	Nal		
		Whiteite-(CaMnFe)	Wt-CaMnFe		
		Napoliite	Npi		
		Sidorovite	Sido		
		Zipserite	Zps		
		Pleysteinite	Pley		
		Tetrahedrite-(Cu)	Ttr-Cu		
		Yeite	Yei		
		Gunmaite	Gum		
		Tianhuixinite	Thx		
		Hakite-(Fe)	Hak-Fe		
		Hakite-(Zn)	Hak-Zn		
		Arsenogoldfieldite	Asgf		
		Stanevansite	Ses		
		Cuprocherokeeite	Cchk		
		Elaliite	Eal		
		Elkinstantonite	Elk		
		Hakite-(Cd)	Hak-Cd		
		Libbyite	Ly		
		Zvĕstovite-(Fe)	Zvĕ-Fe		
		Fabritzite	Fbz		
		Nioboixiolite-(☐)	Nbix-☐		
		Andrieslombaardite	Alo		
		Fluoralforsite	Fafr		
		Tzeferisite	Tze		
		Plumbogaidonnayite	Pgdn		
		Okruginite	Okg		
		Manuelarossiite	Mnrs		
		Olsenite	Ose		
		Ezochiite	Ezo		
		Mikenewite	Mnw		
