= Sulfosalt mineral =

Sulfide minerals of a metal and a semi-metal

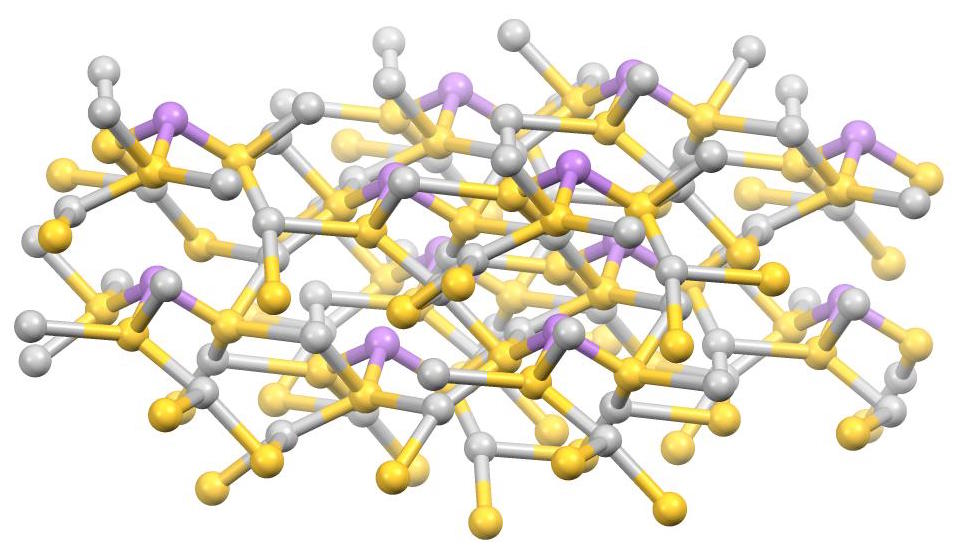
Structure of proustite Ag_{3}AsS_{3}, a classic sulfosalt, which can be viewed as the Ag^{+} salt of AsS^{3−}_{3}. Sulfosalts characteristically feature A–S–B linkages, where A and B are different metals or metalloids.

Sulfosalt minerals are sulfide minerals with the general formula A_{m}B_{n}X_{p}, where

- A represents a metal such as copper, lead, silver, iron, and rarely mercury, zinc, vanadium
- B usually represents semi-metal such as arsenic, antimony, bismuth, and rarely germanium, or metals like tin and rarely vanadium
- X is sulfur or rarely selenium and/or tellurium.

The Strunz classification includes the sulfosalts in a sulfides and sulfosalts superclass. A group which have similar appearing formulas are the sulfarsenides (for example cobaltite (Co,Fe)AsS). In sulfarsenides the arsenic substitutes for sulfide anions whereas in the sulfosalts the arsenic substitutes for a metal cation.

About 200 sulfosalt minerals are known. Examples include:

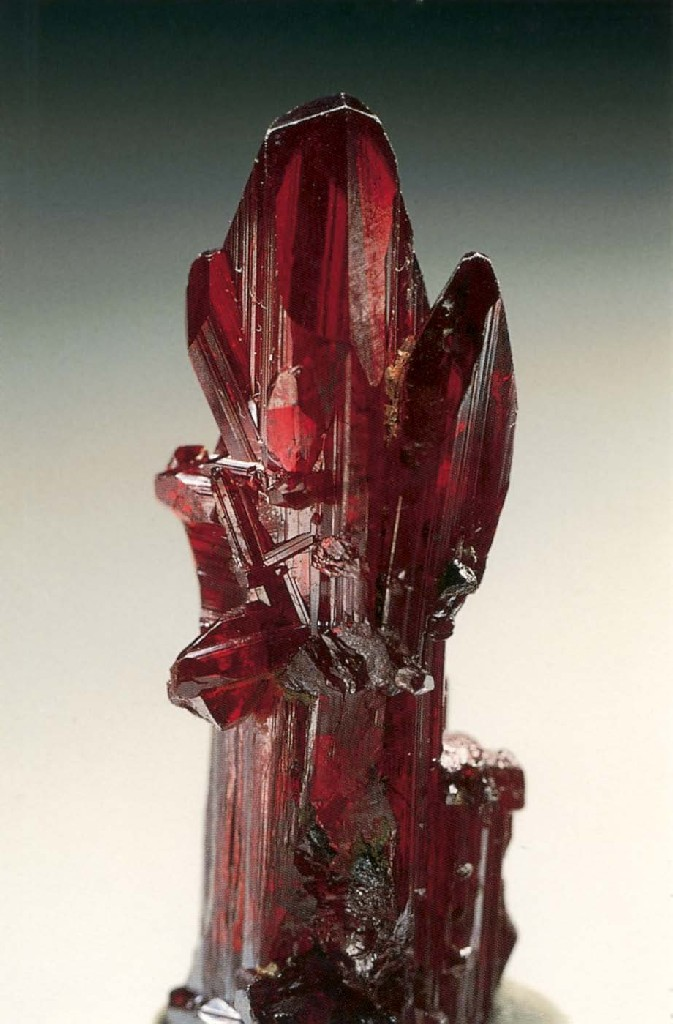
As illustrated by this specimen of proustite, sulfosalt minerals are often deeply colored.
- A_{3}BX_{3} type
  - Pyrargyrite Ag_{3}SbS_{3}
  - Proustite Ag_{3}AsS_{3}
  - Tetrahedrite Cu_{12}Sb_{4}S_{13}
  - Tennantite Cu_{12}As_{4}S_{13}
- A_{3}BX_{4} type
  - Enargite Cu_{3}AsS_{4}
  - Sulvanite Cu_{3}VS_{4}
  - Samsonite Ag_{4}MnSb_{2}S_{6}
  - Geocronite Pb_{14}(Sb,As)_{6}S_{23}
  - Gratonite Pb_{9}As_{4}S_{15}
- A_{2}BX_{3} type
  - Bournonite PbCuSbS_{3}
  - Seligmannite PbCuAsS_{3}
  - Aikinite PbCuBiS_{3}
- ABX_{2} type
  - Boulangerite Pb_{5}Sb_{4}S_{11}
  - Matildite AgBiS_{2}
  - Smithite AgAsS_{2}
  - Chalcostibite CuSbS_{2}
  - Emplectite CuBiS_{2}
  - Lorándite TlAsS_{2}
  - Teallite PbSnS_{2}
- A_{2}B_{2}X_{5} type
  - Ramdohrite Ag_{3}Pb_{6}Sb_{11}S_{24}
  - Jamesonite Pb_{4}FeSb_{6}S_{14}
  - Cosalite Pb_{2}Bi_{2}S_{5}
- A_{2}B_{3}X_{6} type
  - Andorite PbAgSb_{3}S_{6}
  - Lindstromite Pb_{3}Cu_{3}Bi_{7}S_{15}
- AB_{2}X_{4} type
  - Zinkenite Pb_{9}Sb_{22}S_{42}
  - Berthierite FeSb_{2}S_{4}
  - Cylindrite Pb_{3}Sn_{4}FeSb_{2}S_{14}

== Nickel–Strunz Classification -02- Sulfosalts ==
IMA-CNMNC proposes a new hierarchical scheme (Mills et al., 2009). This list uses the Classification of Nickel–Strunz (mindat.org, 10 ed, pending publication).

- Abbreviations:
  - "*" – discredited (IMA/CNMNC status).
  - "?" – questionable/doubtful (IMA/CNMNC status).
  - "REE" – Rare-earth element (Sc, Y, La, Ce, Pr, Nd, Pm, Sm, Eu, Gd, Tb, Dy, Ho, Er, Tm, Yb, Lu)
  - "PGE" – Platinum-group element (Ru, Rh, Pd, Os, Ir, Pt)
  - 03.C Aluminofluorides, 06 Borates, 08 Vanadates (04.H V^{[5,6]} Vanadates), 09 Silicates:
    - Neso: insular (from Greek νῆσος nēsos, island)
    - Soro: grouping (from Greek σωρός sōros, heap, mound (especially of corn))
    - Cyclo: ring (from Greek κύκλος kyklos, wheel, ring, round)
    - Ino: chain (from Greek ἴς [genitive: ἰνός inos], fibre)
    - Phyllo: sheet (from Greek φύλλον phyllon, leaf)
    - Tekto: three-dimensional framework (from Greek stem τεκτ- tekt- in words having to do with carpentry)
- Nickel–Strunz code scheme: NN.XY.##x
  - NN: Nickel–Strunz mineral class number
  - X: Nickel–Strunz mineral division letter
  - Y: Nickel–Strunz mineral family letter
  - ##x: Nickel–Strunz mineral/group number, x add-on letter

=== Class: sulfosalts ===
- 02.G Sulfarsenites, sulfantimonites, sulfobismuthites
  - 02.G: IMA2007-010
  - 02.GA Neso-sulfarsenites, etc., without additional S: 05 Proustite, 05 Pyrargyrite; 10 Xanthoconite, 10 Pyrostilpnite; 15 Samsonite; 20 Wittichenite, 20 Skinnerite, 25 Malyshevite, 25 Lisiguangite, 25 Muckeite, 25 Lapieite; 30 Aktashite, 30 Nowackiite, 30 Gruzdevite; 35 Laffittite; 40 Stalderite, 40 Routhierite; 45 Erniggliite; 50 Seligmannite, 50 Soucekite, 50 Bournonite
  - 02.GB Neso-sulfarsenites, etc.: 05 Argentotennantite, 05 Giraudite, 05 Goldfieldite, 05 Freibergite, 05 Hakite, 05 Tennantite, 05 Tetrahedrite; 10 Selenostephanite, 10 Stephanite; 15 Cupropearceite, 15 Selenopolybasite, 15 Cupropolybasite, 15 Polybasite, 15 Pearceite, 15 Antimonpearceite, 15 Arsenpolybasite, 20 Galkhaite
  - 02.GC Poly-sulfarsenites: 05 Hatchite, 05 Wallisite; 10 Sinnerite, 15 Watanabeite, 20 Simonite, 25 Qratite, 30 Smithite, 35 Trechmannite, 40a Aleksite, 40b Kochkarite, 40c Rucklidgeite, 40c Poubaite, 40d Saddlebackite, 40e Babkinite; 45 Tvalchrelidzeite, 50 Mutnovskite
- 02.H Sulfosalts of SnS Archetype
  - 02.HA With Cu, Ag, Fe (without Pb): 05 Emplectite, 05 Chalcostibite; 10 Miargyrite, 15 Livingstonite; 20 Berthierite, 20 Clerite, 20 Garavellite; 25 Baumstarkite, 25 Aramayoite
  - 02.HB With Cu, Ag, Hg, Fe, Sn and Pb: 05a Krupkaite, 05a Aikinite, 05a Hammarite, 05a Gladite, 05a Friedrichite, 05a Lindstromite, 05a Pekoite, 05a Paarite, 05a Emilite, 05a Salzburgite, 05b Meneghinite, 05c Jaskolskiite; 10a Kobellite, 10a Tintinaite, 10b Giessenite, 10b Izoklakeite, 10c Eclarite; 15 Jamesonite, 15 Benavidesite; 20a Nagyagite, 20b Buckhornite, 20c Museumite, 20d Berryite, 20e Watkinsonite
  - 02.HC With only Pb: 05a Sartorite, 05a Twinnite, 05a Guettardite, 05b Baumhauerite, 05b Baumhauerite-2a, 05c Liveingite, 05d Dufrenoysite, 05d Veenite, 05d Rathite, 05e Chabourneite, 05f Pierrotite, 05f Parapierrotite, 05g Marumoite; 10a Fuloppite, 10b Bismutoplagionite*, 10b Plagionite, 10c Heteromorphite, 10d Semseyite, 10d Rayite; 15 Boulangerite, 15 Falkmanite, 15 Plumosite*; 20 Robinsonite, 25 Moeloite, 30 Dadsonite, 35 Zoubekite, 35 Owyheeite
  - 02.HD With Tl: 05 Lorandite, 05 Weissbergite; 15 Christite, 20 Jankovicite, 25 Rebulite, 30 Imhofite, 35 Edenharterite, 40 Jentschite, 45 Hutchinsonite, 50 Bernardite, 55 Sicherite, 60 Gabrielite
  - 02.HE With alkalies, H_{2}O: 05 Gerstleyite
  - 02.HF With SnS and PbS archetype structure units: 20 Vrbaite; 25a Abramovite, 25a Levyclaudite, 25a Cylindrite, 25b Coiraite, 25b Incaite, 25b Potosiite, 25b Franckeite; 30 Lengenbachite
- 02.J Sulfosalts of PbS Archetype
  - 02.JA Galena derivatives with little or no Pb: 05a IMA2005-036, 05a IMA2008-058, 05a Cupropavonite, 05a Pavonite, 05b Grumiplucite, 05c Kudriavite, 05d Cupromakovickyite, 05d Makovickyite, 05e Benjaminite, 05f Mummeite, 05g Borodaevite, 05h Mozgovaite; 10a Cuprobismutite, 10b Kupcikite, 10c Hodrushite, 10d Pizgrischite, 10e Paderaite; 15 Cuboargyrite, 15 Schapbachite; 20 Bohdanowiczite, 20 Matildite, 20 Volynskite
  - 02.JB Galena derivatives, with Pb: 05 Diaphorite, 10 Cosalite; 15 Marrite, 15 Freieslebenite; 20 Cannizzarite, 20 Wittite; 25a Junoite, 25b Felbertalite, 25c Nordstromite, 25d Proudite, 25g Nuffieldite, 25i IMA2008-053, 25i Neyite, 25j Rouxelite; 30a Jordanite, 30a Geocronite, 30b Kirkiite, 30c Tsugaruite; 35a Zinkenite, 35b Scainiite, 35c Pillaite, 35d Pellouxite; 40a Bursaite?, 40a Gustavite, 40a Lillianite, 40a Xilingolite, 40a Treasurite, 40a Vikingite, 40a Fizelyite, 40a Andorite, 40a Roshchinite, 40a Uchucchacuaite, 40a Ramdohrite, 40b Aschamalmite, 40b Eskimoite, 40b Heyrovskyite, 40c Ourayite, 40d Schirmerite, 40e Ustarasite; 45 Angelaite, 45 Galenobismutite, 45 Weibullite; 55 Gratonite, 60 Marrucciite, 65 Vurroite
  - 02.JC Galena derivatives, with Tl: 05 Ellisite, 10 Gillulyite
- 02.K Sulfarsenates, Sulfantimonates
  - 02.KA Sulfarsenates with (As,Sb)S_{4} tetrahedra: 05 Enargite, 05 Stibioenargite*, 05 Petrukite; 10 Briartite, 10 Famatinite, 10 Luzonite, 10 Permingeatite, 10 Barquillite; 15 Fangite
  - 02.KB Sulfarsenates with additional S: 05 Billingsleyite
- 02.L Unclassified Sulfosalts
  - 02.LA Without essential Pb: 10 Dervillite, 15 Daomanite*, 20 Vaughanite, 25 Criddleite, 30 Fettelite, 35 Chameanite, 40 Arcubisite, 45 Mgriite, 50 Benleonardite, 55 Tsnigriite, 60 Borovskite, 65 Jonassonite
  - 02.LB With essential Pb: 05 Miharaite, 20 Ardaite, 30 Madocite, 35 Larosite; 40 Petrovicite, 40 Mazzettiite; 45 Crerarite, 50 Launayite, 55 Playfairite, 60 Sorbyite, 65 Sterryite
- 02.M
  - 02.MA Oxysulfosalts of Alkalies and Alkali Earths: 05 Ottensite, 05 Cetineite; 10 Sarabauite
- 02.X Unclassified Strunz Sulfosalts
  - 02.XX Unknown: 00 Tazieffite, 00 Horobetsuite*, 00 Kitaibelite?, 00 Parajamesonite?, 00 Sakharovaite?, 00 Volfsonite*

== Synthetic sulfosalts ==
Many sulfosalts can be prepared in the laboratory, including many that do not occur in nature.
