= Sartorite =

Lead arsenic sulfide

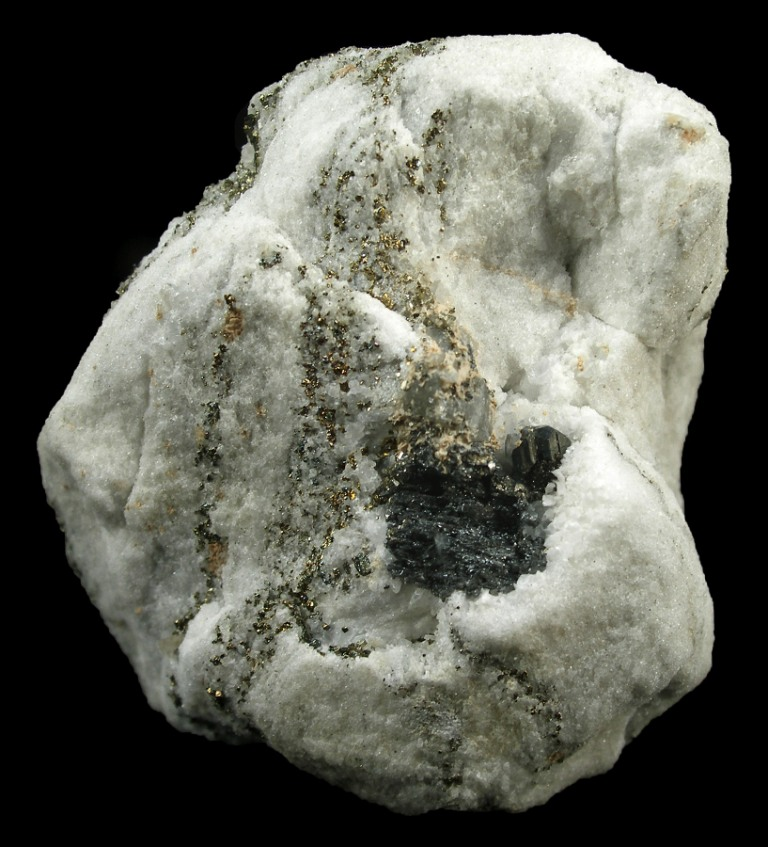

General
- Category: Satorite Group
- Formula: PbAs_{2}S_{4}
- IMA symbol: Sat
- Strunz classification: 2.HC.05a
- Dana classification: 3.7.8.1
- Crystal system: Monoclinic
- Crystal class: Prismatic
- Space group: P2_{1}/c (no. 14)
- Unit cell: 648.62 Å³

Identification
- Colour: Grey
- Cleavage: Imperfect/Fair
- Fracture: Conchoidal
- Tenacity: Very brittle
- Mohs scale hardness: 3
- Luster: Metallic
- Streak: chocolate-brown
- Diaphaneity: Opaque
- Specific gravity: 5.08 - 5.12
- Density: 5.08 - 5.12 g/cm^{3}
- Pleochroism: Weak

Sartorite is a lead arsenic sulfide with the chemical formula PbAs_{2}S_{4} and as type locality the Lengenbach Quarry in Legenbach, Binnental, Valais, Switzerland. Historically, sartorite has been thought isomorphic to chalcostibite, emplectite, and zinckenite, but was definitively distinguished from the others in 1939.

== Etymology ==
The mineral is named after its discoverer, Sartorius von Walterhausen (1809-1876).

== Occurrences ==
The mineral is predominantly found in hydrothermal deposits in dolomite. The mineral sometimes contains traces of thallium. It has been reported from:

- Argentina
  - Jujuy Province
    - Rinconada Department
      - Rinconada
        - Cerro Redondo prospect
- Austria
  - Tyrol
    - North Tyrol
      - Inn valley
        - Innsbruck
    - Hall
      - Hall valley
        - Salt mine
- Azerbaijan
  - Balakan District
    - Belokan-Avar ore district
      - Filizchai deposit
- China
  - Hunan
    - Huaihua
      - Huitong Co.
        - Mobin Au deposit (Unconfirmed)
- Hungary
  - Pest County
    - Szob District
      - Nagybörzsöny
- Italy
  - Tuscany
    - Lucca Province
      - Seravezza
        - Seravezza quarrying basin
- Japan
  - Hokkaidō
    - Abuta District
      - Takarada
        - Tohya mine (Toya mine; Tohya-Takarada mine) ?
- Spain
  - Andalusia
    - Granada
      - Baza
        - Sierra de Baza
          - Calar de San José
- Switzerland
  - Valais
    - Binn Valley
      - Binn
        - Reckibach
          - Lengenbach Quarry (TL)
          - Messerbach (Mässerbach)
- United States
  - Colorado
    - San Juan Co.
      - Red Mountain Mining District
        - Anvil Mountain
          - Zuñi mine
  - New York
    - St. Lawrence Co.
      - Fowler
        - Sylvia Lake
          - Balmat mine

== See also ==
- List of minerals
  - baumhauerite
  - gratonite
  - guettardite
  - seligmannite
