= Fülöppite =

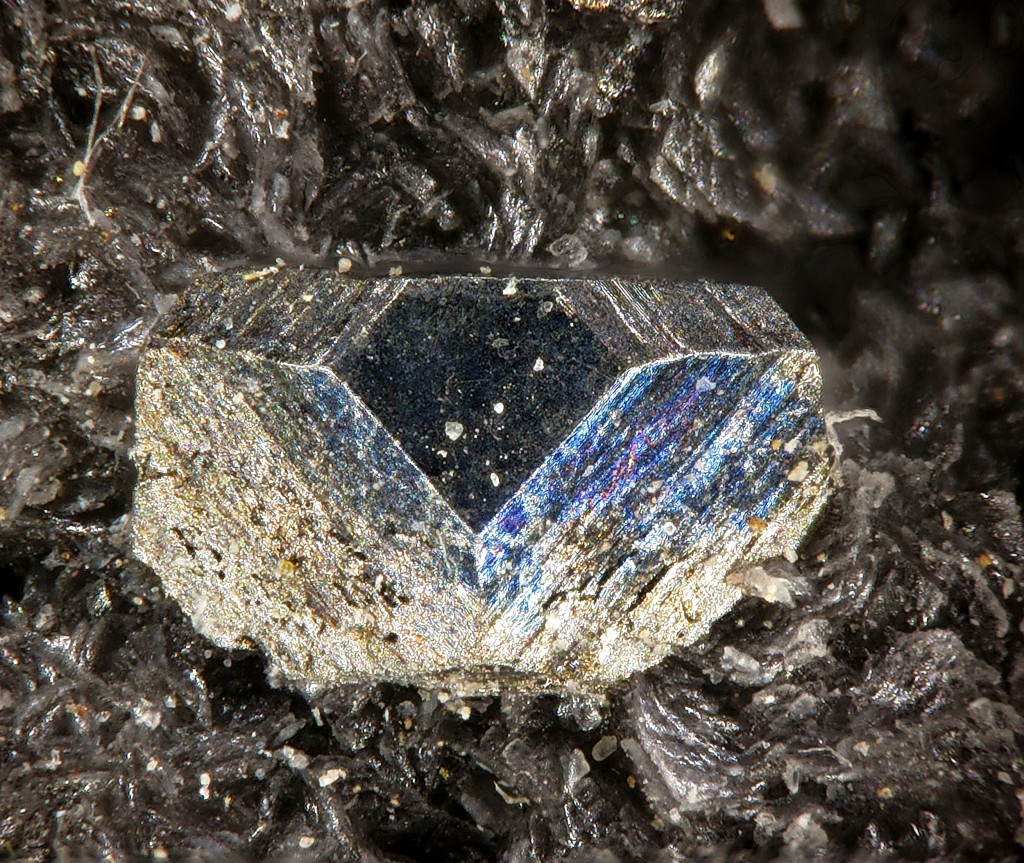
- Fülöppite from Baia Mare, Romania

General
- Category: sulfosalts
- Formula: Pb_{3}Sb_{8}S_{15}
- IMA symbol: Fül
- Strunz classification: 2.HC.10a (10 ed); 2/E.21-50 (8 ed)
- Dana classification: 03.06.20.01
- Crystal system: Monoclinic
- Crystal class: Prismatic (2/m) (same H-M symbol)
- Space group: C2/c

Identification
- Formula mass: 2,076.59 g/mol
- Color: Lead-gray; may tarnish steel-blue or bronzy white
- Crystal habit: Short prismatic and pyramidal
- Fracture: Uneven
- Tenacity: Brittle
- Mohs scale hardness: 2 1/2
- Luster: Metallic
- Streak: reddish grey
- Diaphaneity: Opaque
- Specific gravity: 5.2

Fülöppite is a rare member of the plagionite group, comprising heteromorphite Pb_{7}Sb_{8}S_{19}, plagionite Pb_{5}Sb_{8}S_{17} and semseyite Pb_{9}Sb_{8}S_{21}. It was named in 1929 for Dr. Béla Fülöpp (1863–1938), a Hungarian lawyer, statesman and mineral collector.

== Structure ==
Fülöppite forms a homologous series with other members of the plagionite group. The structures of these minerals differ by the thickness of a galena sheet which occurs in all of them. Fülöppite has the thinnest such sheet.

== Crystallography ==
There are four formula units (Z = 4) per unit cell, and it has sides of lengths a = 13.44 Å, b = 11.73 Å and c = 16.93 Å, with the angle between a̅ and c̅ being β = 94.7°.

Crystals are short prismatic parallel to [201], up to 3 mm long, or pyramidal. They are striated on {100} parallel to [01̅0] and on {1̅12} parallel to [110]. Forms which have been observed include (001), (100), (1̅01), (112), (111), (2̅23), (1̅11) and (2̅21). Curved crystals are common. The numbers in brackets are Miller indices.

== Appearance ==
The crystals are short prismatic and pyramidal, with a lead-grey colour that may tarnish to steel-blue or bronze-white. The streak is reddish grey. The crystals are opaque, with a metallic lustre.

== Physical properties ==
Fülöppite is opaque. A petrographic microscope can be used to examine opaque materials under reflected polarised light. Under these conditions the mineral shows moderate anisotropism, changing colour from blue-green to red-brown. The reflectivity of a surface is the percentage of incident light energy that is reflected. It varies with the medium above the surface, such as air or oil, and with the wavelength of the incident light. The reflectivity of fülöppite in air for light of wavelength 540 nm is 31.9% to 40.1%.

The mineral is brittle with an uneven fracture. It is soft, with a Moh's hardness of only 2 1/2, and heavy, with specific gravity 5.2. It melts easily in an open tube yielding sulphur fumes and a deposit of Sb_{2}S_{2}. It is not attacked by concentrated hydrochloric acid.

== Occurrence ==
The type locality is the Dealul Crucii Adit, Baia Mare, Maramureș County, Romania, and the type material is kept at the Natural History Museum, London, England, reference 1929,248. It is of hydrothermal origin and associated with zinkenite, semseyite, fizélyite, andorite, freieslebenite, geocronite, boulangerite, jamesonite, cinnabar, sphalerite, marcasite, quartz and dolomite. Fülöppite was first reported in Britain from Wet Swine Gill, Caldbeck Fells, Cumbria. It was described as dark grey metallic patches of fibrous crystals accompanying stibnite. Subsequently, rare dark red resinous to submetallic crystals associated with stibnite were identified as being close to fülöppite in composition.
