= Hermann Jordan =

German naturalist (1808–1887)

- Born: Friedrich Wilhelm Hermann Jordan; April 19, 1808; Wetzlar, Holy Roman Empire
- Died: August 8, 1887 (aged 79); Saarbrücken, German Empire
- Occupations: Naturalist paleontologist
- Years active: 1849–1865
- Known for: Discovery of Jordanite
- Spouse: Henriette Röder

Friedrich Wilhelm Hermann Jordan (April 19, 1808 – August 8, 1887) was a German naturalist and scientist.

== Early life ==
Jordan was born in Wetzlar in 1808 to Dr. Johann Gerhard Jordan (1767–1830), a physician, and Sophie Henriette Seidensticker (1772–1829).

In his formative years, Jordan fell ill with some sort of pulmonary condition, and found a high-altitude town in Switzerland and spent weeks there every summer in the village of Imfeld near the Lengenbach Quarry in the Binn Valley for many years. During his time near the quarry, he developed an interest in minerology and assembled a collection of Swiss minerals.

== Career ==
Jordna was responsible for the discovery of crystal regeneration. In 1849, during repair work on the iron smelter at Fischbach-Camphausen, a "magnificent crystal crust" was found, which he recognized as zinc oxide.

In 1851, he was elected to be the town physician in Saarbrücken.

In 1854, he collaborated with Christian Erich Hermann von Meyer to publish Ueber die Crustaceen der Steinkohlenformation von Saarbrücken, and contributed to his paleontological research of molluscs.

In 1864, he discovered Jordanite, which was subsequently named for him.

== Legacy ==
Jordan died on August 8, 1887 in Saarbrücken. His mineral collection was donated by Paul Heinrich von Groth to the University of Strasbourg. They supposedly inspired many minerologists like Gerhard vom Rath, Wolfgang Sartorius von Waltershausen, and Heinrich Adolph Baumhauer to take an interest in the minerals of that region.
