= Franckeite =

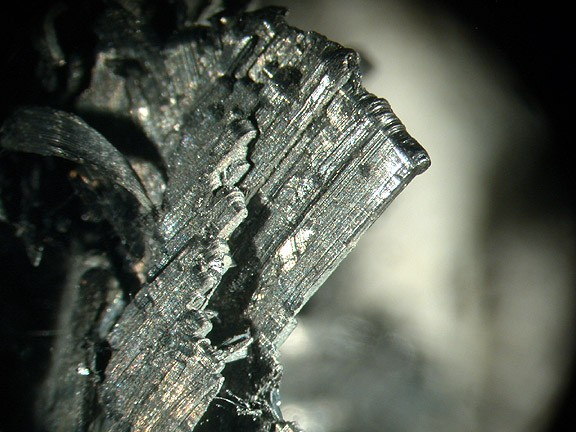
- Franckeite var. Potosíite, San José Mine, Cercado Province Bolivia. Field of view about 10 mm.

General
- Category: Sulfosalt mineral
- Formula: (Pb,Sn^{2+})_{6}Fe^{2+}Sn_{2}Sb_{2}S_{14}
- IMA symbol: Fke
- Strunz classification: 2.HF.25b
- Dana classification: 03.01.04.02
- Crystal system: Triclinic
- Crystal class: Pinacoidal (1̅) (same H-M symbol)
- Space group: P1̅

Identification
- Color: Grayish black
- Crystal habit: Typically in spherical, rosette aggregates of thin plates; commonly massive, radiated, or foliated
- Twinning: Complex
- Cleavage: {010}, perfect
- Tenacity: Flexible, inelastic; slightly malleable
- Mohs scale hardness: 2.5 – 3
- Luster: Metallic
- Streak: Grayish black
- Diaphaneity: Opaque
- Specific gravity: 5.88 – 5.92
- Pleochroism: Weak

Franckeite, chemical formula Pb_{5}Sn_{3}Sb_{2}S_{14}, belongs to a family of complex sulfide minerals. Franckeite is a sulfosalt. It is closely related to cylindrite.

It was first described in 1893 for an occurrence in Chocaya, Potosí Department, Bolivia. It is named after the mining engineers, Carl and Ernest Francke. It can be found in Bolivia at Poopó in Oruro and at Las Aminas, southeast of Chocaya, in Potosi. Franckeite has an average density of 5.7 and can be both grayish black, blackish gray in color.

It occurs in hydrothermal silver-tin deposits in Bolivia and in contact metamorphosed limestone deposit in the Kalkar quarry in California. It occurs with cylindrite, teallite, plagionite, zinkenite, cassiterite, wurtzite, pyrrhotite, marcasite, arsenopyrite, galena, pyrite, sphalerite, siderite and stannite.

== See also ==
- List of minerals
- List of minerals named after people
