= Heinrich Adolph Baumhauer =

German chemist and mineralogist

- Born: 26 October 1848; Bonn, Kingdom of Prussia
- Died: 1 August 1926 (aged 77); Freiburg, Switzerland
- Known for: Polytypism
- Scientific career
- Fields: Chemistry, Mineralogy
- Workplaces: University of Freiburg

Heinrich Adolph Baumhauer (26 October 1848, Bonn, Kingdom of Prussia – 1 August 1926, Freiburg, Switzerland) was a German chemist and mineralogist.

Baumhauer was the son of lithographer and merchant Mathias Baumhauer (1810–70) and Anna Margaretha Käuffer (variously Kaeuffer, Keuffer, Kaufmann) of Bonn. He studied in Bonn from 1866 to 1869 with Friedrich August Kekule von Stradonitz, Hans Heinrich Landolt and Gerhard vom Rath, receiving his doctorate for the dissertation “Die Reduction des Nitrobenzols durch Chlor-und Bromwasserstoff.” He spent an additional year studying at Göttingen in 1870.

In 1871 Baumhauer became a teacher at the Technical University in Frankenberg, Saxony. After a short period of teaching at the Handelsschule in Hildesheim in 1872, he became a chemistry teacher from 1873 to 1896 at the agricultural school of Lüdinghausen, Westphalia. From 1895 to 1925 he was professor of mineralogy and after 1906/1907 also a professor of inorganic chemistry in Freiburg, Switzerland. He was appointed Director of the newly created Department of Mineralogy at the University of Freiburg in 1896, and led the Freiburger Institut für Mineralogie until 1925.

In 1870 he wrote about the relationship between atomic weights and the properties of elements, and proposed his own periodic system on spirals based on increasing atomic weights. He also wrote textbooks on inorganic chemistry (1884), organic chemistry (1885), and mineralogy (1884). He was well known for his book Das Reich der Kristalle ("The Kingdom of Crystals", 1889).

He evaluated etching figures on crystals and made studies on minerals from dolomite and new minerals. The etching method he developed contributed to the understanding of crystalline structures. His book Die Resultate der Aetzmethode ("The results of the Aetz method", 1894) was the standard resource on this method until 1927. He was the first to introduce the idea of polytypism in minerals.

Baumhauer was the first to describe the mineral Rathite which he named for Gerhard vom Rath. He also discovered Seligmannite, which was named in honor of Gustav Seligmann. A mineral is named in his honor as well: the rare dark gray lead-arsenic-sulphide Baumhauerite (Pb 3 As 4 S 9), which is found in the Lengenbach Quarry in Binntal, Switzerland. Baumhauer's collection of minerals from the Binntal, containing more than 750 pieces as well as handwritten observation journals, correspondence, and other materials, is held by the Freiburger Institut für Mineralogie. His collection helped to establish the reputation of the Institut.

Baumhauer became a member of the Mineralogical Society of St. Petersburg in 1878, an honorary member of the Mineralogical Society of Great Britain and Ireland in 1879, a member of the Mineralogical Society of London in 1905 and a member of the Leopoldina or German Academy of Natural Scientists in 1926.
