= Guettardite =

Sulfosalt mineral

General
- Category: Sulfosalt mineral
- Formula: Pb(Sb,As)_{2}S_{4}
- IMA symbol: Gue
- Strunz classification: 2.HC.05a
- Crystal system: Monoclinic
- Crystal class: Prismatic (2/m) (same H-M symbol)
- Space group: P2_{1}/a
- Unit cell: a = 20.17, b = 7.94 c = 8.72 [Å]; β = 101.12°; Z = 8

Identification
- Color: Grayish black; white with reddish internal reflections in polished section
- Crystal habit: Acicular crystals and anhedral grains
- Twinning: Polysynthetic twinning on {100}
- Cleavage: Perfect on {001}
- Fracture: Conchoidal
- Tenacity: Very brittle
- Mohs scale hardness: 4
- Luster: Metallic
- Streak: Brown
- Diaphaneity: Opaque
- Specific gravity: 5.2
- Pleochroism: Relatively strong

Guettardite is a rare arsenic-antimony lead sulfosalt mineral with the chemical formula Pb(Sb,As)_{2}S_{4}. It forms gray black metallic prismatic to acicular crystals with monoclinic symmetry. It is a dimorph of the triclinic twinnite.

== Discovery and occurrence ==
It was first described in 1967 for an occurrence in the Taylor Pit, Madoc, Hastings County, Ontario, Canada. It was named for French naturalist Jean-Étienne Guettard (1715–1786).

It occurs in hydrothermal veins within marble at the type locality in Modoc. It occurs associated with pyrite, sphalerite, wurtzite, galena, stibnite, orpiment, realgar, enargite, tetrahedrite, zinkenite, jordanite, bournonite, sterryite, boulangerite, jamesonite and sartorite at Madoc.

In addition to the type locality, it has been reported from the Brobdingnag mine, near Silverton, Colorado; the Jas Roux deposit in Hautes-Alpes, France; from various marble quarries near Seravezza, Tuscany, Italy; a marble quarry in Valais, Switzerland and from Khaydarkan, Fergana Valley, Alai Mountains, Kyrgyzstan.

== See also ==
- List of minerals named after people
