= Semseyite =

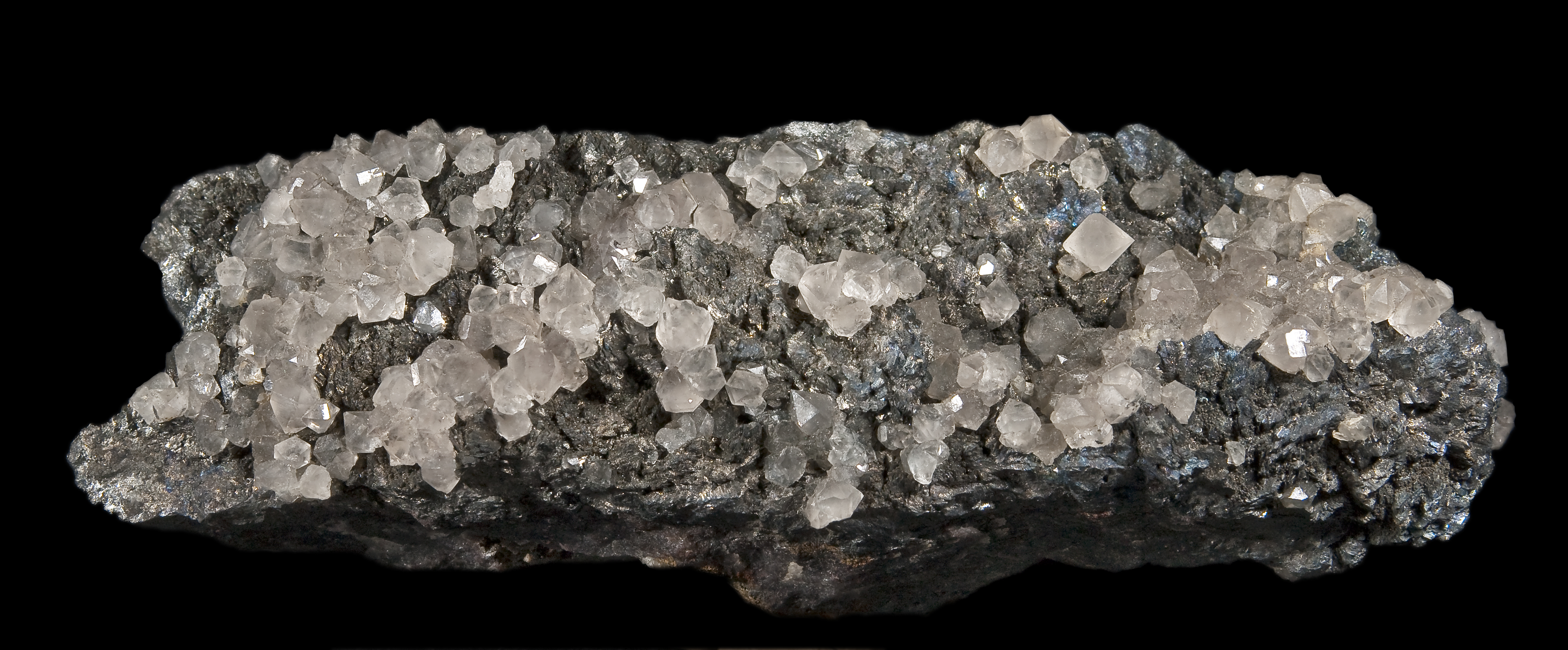
- Semseyite - Brioude-Massiac (Massif Central) France (11x3.5cm)

General
- Category: Sulfosalt mineral
- Formula: Pb_{9} Sb _{8} S_{21}
- IMA symbol: Ssy
- Strunz classification: 2.HC.10d
- Crystal system: Monoclinic
- Crystal class: Prismatic (2/m) (same H-M symbol)
- Space group: C2/c
- Unit cell: a = 13.64 Å, b = 11.96 Å c = 24.46 Å; β = 105.87°; Z = 4

Identification
- Color: Dark gray to black
- Crystal habit: Tabular, elongated prismatic crystals, commonly twisted; rosettelike groups
- Cleavage: Perfect on {112}
- Tenacity: Brittle
- Mohs scale hardness: 2.5
- Luster: Metallic
- Diaphaneity: opaque
- Specific gravity: 6.15

Semseyite is a rarely occurring sulfosalt mineral and is part of the class of lead antimony sulfides. It crystallizes in the monoclinic system with the chemical composition Pb_{9}Sb_{8}S_{21}. The mineral forms dark gray to black aggregates.

== Etymology and history ==
Semseyite was first described for an occurrence in the Felsöbánya mine in Baia Sprie, Romania in 1881 by József Sándor Krenner (1839–1920). The mineral was named after Hungarian mineralogist Andor von Semsey (1833–1923).

== Occurrence ==
Semseyite forms in hydrothermal solutions at temperatures between 300 and 350 °C. It occurs in association with bournonite, jamesonite, sphalerite, zinkenite, sorbyite, guettardite, jordanite, diaphorite, galena, pyrite, chalcopyrite, tetrahedrite, arsenopyrite and siderite.

== Images ==
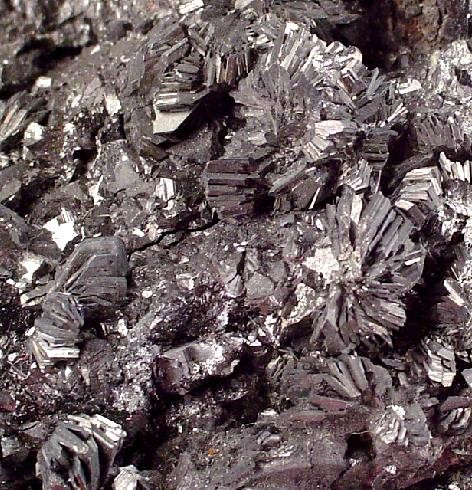
Semseyite from Baia Sprie, Maramureș County, Romania

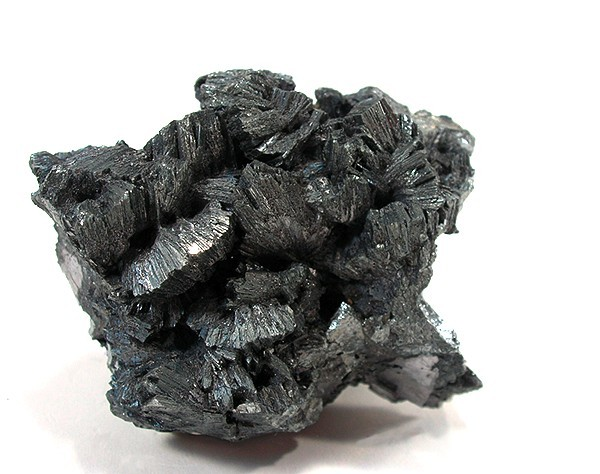
Cluster of semseyite crystals on massive sulfide matrix

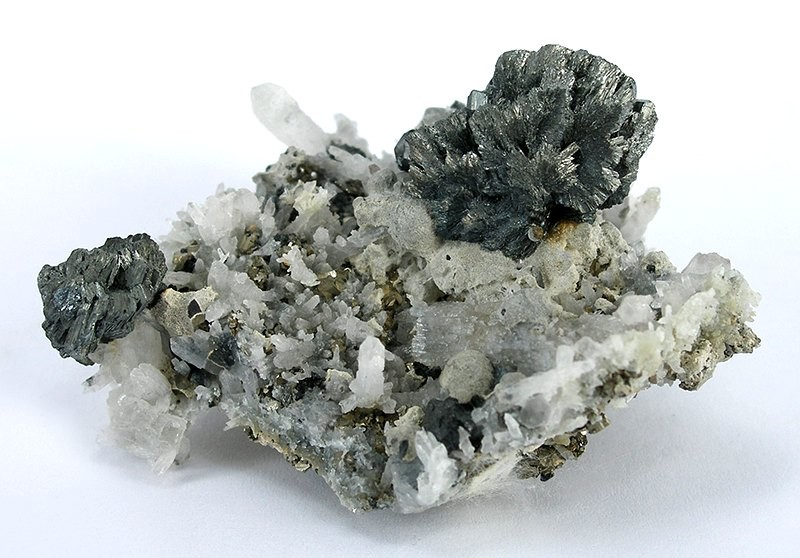
A spray of semseyite crystals perched, freestanding, at the apex of a cluster of quartz crystals. Herja Mine (Kisbánya), Baia Mare (Nagybánya), Maramureș County, Romania

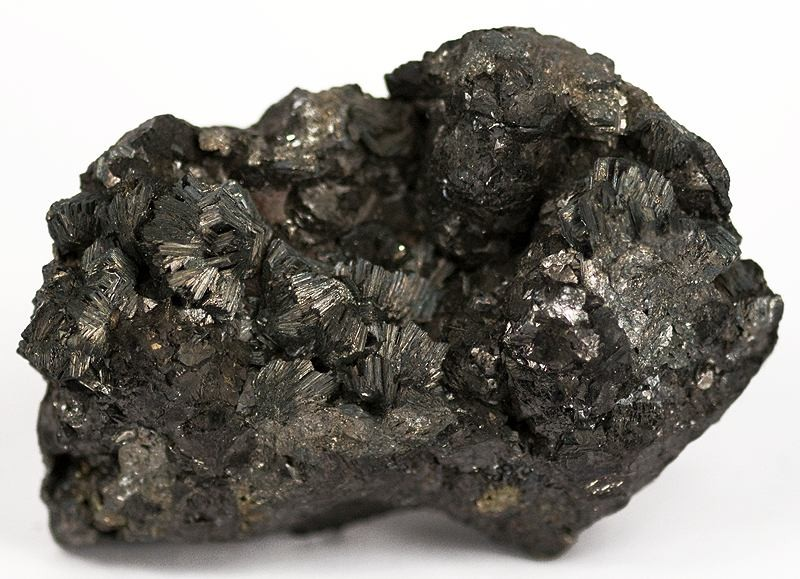
Vug filled with clusters of sprays of lightly iridescent, metallic-lustre semseyite blades on sphalerite matrix
