= Rayite =

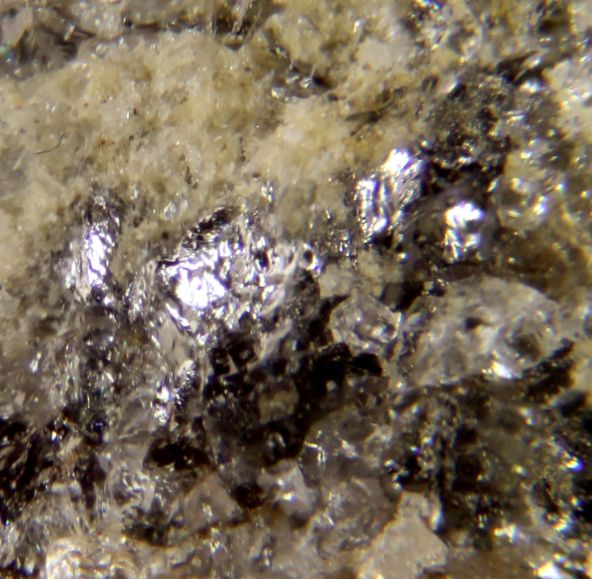

General
- Category: Plagionite homologous series
- Formula: Pb_{8}(Ag,Tl)_{2}Sb_{8}S_{21}
- Crystal system: Monoclinic
- Crystal class: 2/m - Prismatic
- Unit cell: a = 13.6 Å, b = 11.96 Å c = 24.49 Å; β= 103.94°

Identification
- Color: Lead-Grey
- Crystal habit: Tabular
- Cleavage: None
- Mohs scale hardness: 2.5
- Lustre: Metallic
- Streak: Lead-Grey
- Density: 6.13 g/cm^{3} (Calculated)
- Birefringence: Weak
- Pleochroism: Weak
- Common impurities: Cu

Rayite, a monoclinic mineral containing Lead-Silver-Thallium-Antimony, was found during microscopic and electron microprobe study of specimens from the complex, polymetallic sulphide-native metal sulpho-salt paragenesis of Rajpura-Dariba, Rajasthan, India. It is named after Dr. Santosh K. Ray of President College, Calcutta, India. It bears a striking resemblance to owyheeite in terms of its Lead/(Silver,Thallium)/Antimony ratio, yet its structural affinity lies with Semseyite. The average composition is Lead-47.06, Copper-0.03, Silver-4.54, Thallium-2.04, Antimony-27.42, Sulphur-19.59 by wt.% (total 100.68) suggesting an ideal formula of Pb_{8}(Ag,Tl)_{2}Sb_{8}S_{21}, where Ag > Tl. Meneghinite, Owyheeite, and Galena are related minerals.

== Occurrence ==
It was found in the ores of precambrian polymetallic massive-sulfide deposit interbedded with kyanite-graphite schists, diopside-bearing calc-silicates, and meta-cherts in Rajpura-Dariba deposit, Udaipur Division, Udaipur District, Dariba Mine, Rajasthan, India. It is observed in patches, measuring up to 0.5 mm, reaching a maximum dimension of about 30 μm.

== Physical properties ==
Rayite can occur as individual grains with a tabular habit that can reach a maximum diameter of about 30 um, or as patches up to 0.5 mm. Meneghinite, owyheeite, and galena are the related minerals. The mineral is lead grey in colour from a macro perspective, with a metallic lustre and a lead grey streak. Because of its small grainsize and rarity, no cleavage could be observed, and its density could not be calculated. It is also found that rayite is not radioactive.

Rayite is a white mineral with faint bluish and greenish under a microscope. When in touch with galena, it takes on a grey tint; when it grows in between meneghinite, it takes on a bluish-greenish tint. Under a microscope, rayite's colour and reflectance resemble owyheeite's, though the latter exhibits a more pronounced red, index, and olive tinge. The mineral's bireflectance is weak in the studied sections, and the colour of reflection pleochroism shifts from green to blue-green. Anisotropism is perceptible and appears as dark blue to dark reddish-brown when polarizers are not fully crossed, and no internal reflections are observed.

== Chemical composition ==
Electron microprobe analyses conducted on four grains, revealed the absence of elements with atomic numbers greater than 11. Calculations based on 39 atoms yielded satisfactory results, and the determined ideal formula was expressed as Pb_{8}(Ag,Tl)_{2}Sb_{8}S_{21}. The relationship between silver and thallium remains uncertain due to the available data. Microprobe analyses indicated a slight variation in thallium/silver ratios, suggesting the potential substitution of silver for thallium. The presence of an excess metal atom per unit formula compared to the ideal semseyite formula (Me_{17}S_{21}) is deemed noteworthy. Therefore, this implies that it is conceivable for half of the (silver + thallium) atoms to take the place of lead sites within the crystal structure. Simultaneously, the other half could fill the ordinarily unoccupied tetrahedral spaces between the "stibnite" chains, resembling the pattern observed in the bismuthite-aikinite homologous series. Earlier observations pointed to compositional variations in natural semseyite, indicating an excess of lead atoms beyond the stoichiometric composition, with statistical distribution of lead atoms within the unit cell. The identification of rayite supported this proposition, suggesting its crystal structure as a "stuffed" derivative of the semseyite crystal.

Element	wt%
Pb	47.06
Cu	0.03
Ag	4.54
Tl	2.04
Sb	27.42
S	19.59
Total	100.68

== X-ray crystallography ==
The material, subject to electron probe analysis, was extracted from a polished section beneath an ore microscope however fragments suitable for a single crystal study was not found. Utilizing unfiltered Fe-radiation and a 57.3 mm camera, X-ray powder diffraction data were obtained. Data showed a significant similarity to those reported for semseyite (lead,antimony,sulphur) however it wasn’t entirely identical. For the X-ray diffraction powder pattern analysis of rayite, cell dimensions were determined as follows: a = 13.603, b = 11.935, c = 24.453 Å, with a β angle of 106.05°, and the space group C2/c. The resulting lattice constants are approximately a = 13.60 ± 0.02, b = 11.96 ± 0.03, c = 24.49 ± 0.05 Å, with an angle β of 103.94 ± 0.12°.

== See also ==
- Semseyite
