= Smithite =

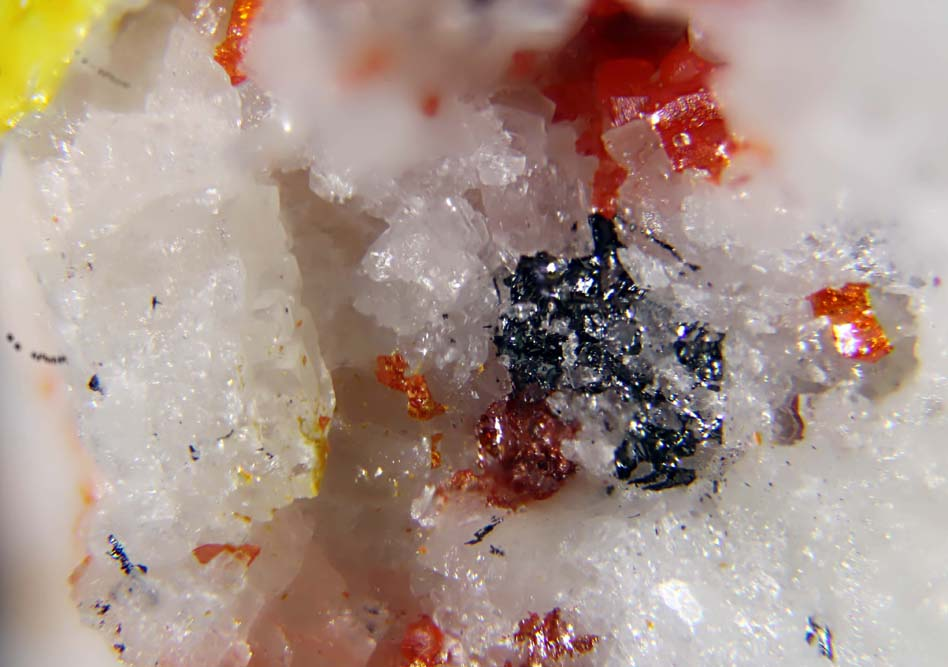
- Red smithite with imhofite

General
- Category: sulfosalt mineral
- Formula: AgAsS_{2}
- IMA symbol: Sth
- Strunz classification: 2.GC.30
- Crystal system: Monoclinic

Identification
- Formula mass: 246.92 g/mol
- Color: Pale red (changes to orange on exposure to light)
- Crystal habit: hexagonal pyramid
- Cleavage: Perfect, parallel to (100)
- Mohs scale hardness: 1.5 – 2
- Luster: Adamantine
- Streak: vermilion
- Specific gravity: 4.88

Smithite is a sulfosalt mineral with the chemical formula AgAsS_{2}. It was first described by mineralogist R H Solly in 1905, in samples from the Lengenbach quarry near Binn, Switzerland, and was named for Herbert Smith, who was an assistant in the department of mineralogy of the British Museum (Natural History). Smithite is a dimorph of trechmannite.
