= Gabrielite =

Sulfosalt mineral

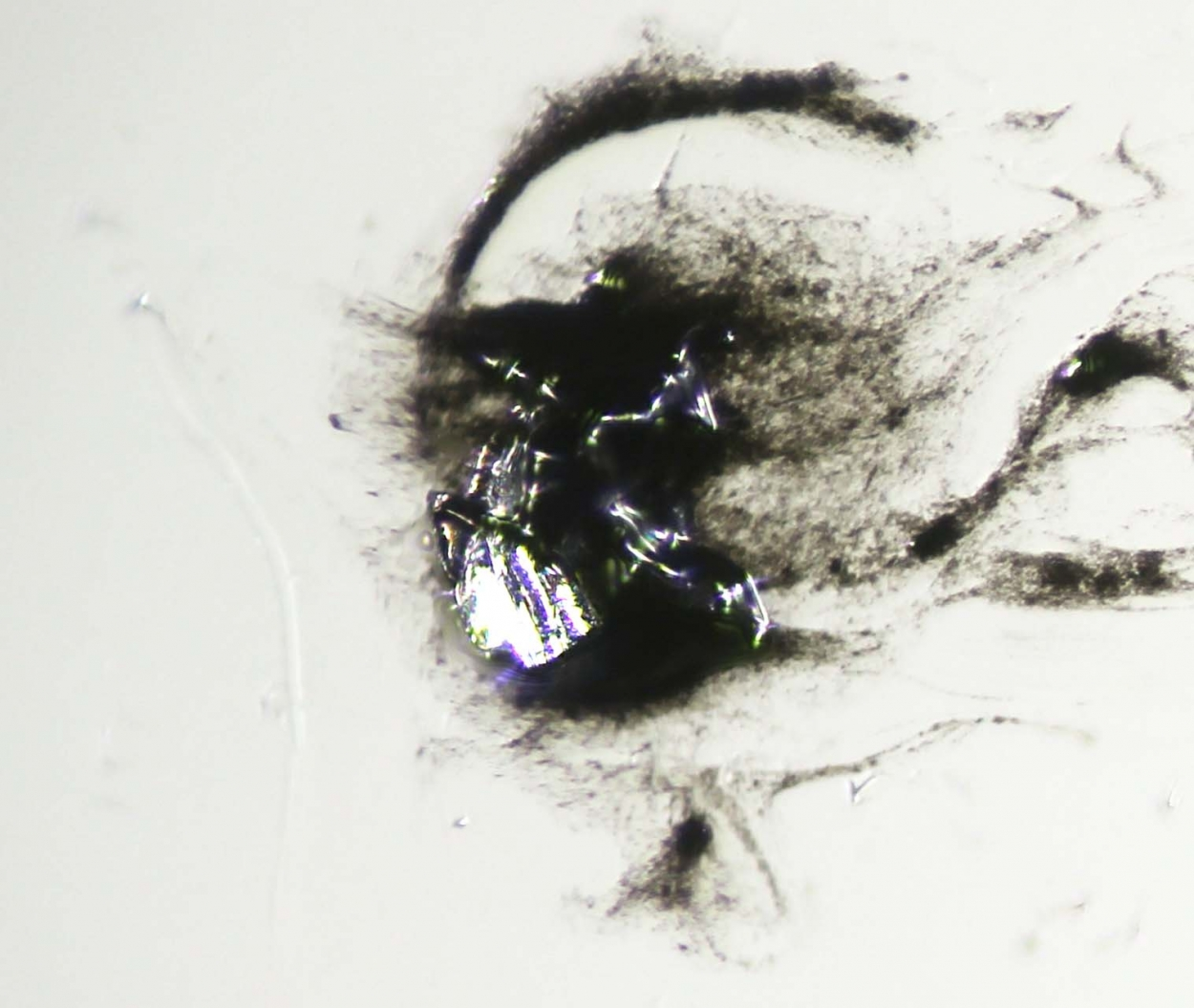
- A small gabrielite crystal

General
- Category: Sulfide mineral
- Formula: Tl_{6}Ag_{3}Cu_{6}(As,Sb)_{9}S_{21}
- IMA symbol: Gab
- Strunz classification: 2.HD.60
- Crystal system: Triclinic
- Crystal class: Pinacoidal (1̅) (same H-M symbol)
- Space group: P1̅
- Unit cell: a = 12.138, b = 12.196 c = 15.944 [Å]; α = 78.537° β = 84.715°, γ = 60.47°; Z = 6

Identification
- Color: Grey to black
- Crystal habit: Pseudo Hexagonal
- Twinning: Common, with (100) as twin plane
- Cleavage: Perfect on {001}
- Fracture: uneven
- Mohs scale hardness: 1.5 - 2
- Luster: Metallic
- Streak: Blackish red
- Diaphaneity: Opaque
- Density: 5.38 g/cm^{3}
- Birefringence: weak 470nm R=30.53% 546nm R=29.1% 589nm R=27.94% 650nm R=26.35%

Gabrielite is an extremely rare thallium sulfosalt mineral with a chemical formula of Tl_{6}Ag_{3}Cu_{6}(As,Sb)_{9}S_{21} or Tl_{2}AgCu_{2}As_{3}S_{7}.

It was first reported in 2002 for its occurrence in the Lengenbach quarry, Binntal, Valais, Switzerland. According to Faszination Lengenbach (2008), only 2 specimens are known. A few dozen tiny fragments like the one pictured are circulating few collections. Named after Walter Gabriel (born 1943), a Swiss mineral photographer. This region was transformed during the greenschist-garnet/amphibolite facies of metamorphism. Due to this many rare sulfosalts like gabrielite are found in this part of Switzerland.

== Structure and properties ==
Gabrielite has a pseudohexagonal shape and the crystal structure is composed of parallel sheets of ditriagonalization of hexagons which reduces it to a P3 symmetry. According to the American Mineralogist, Gabrielite shows a 6-Fold outline. Gabrielite is part of the triclinic crystal system, which means that the pseudohexagonal shape that this mineral occurs in nature with only has a center of symmetry.

Looking into the optical mineralogy of this mineral we have to define if the mineral is isotropic (uniformity properties in all directions on the axes), or anisotropic (when measured the differences in the properties along the axes). According to Mindat.org, Gabrielite has anisotropic properties. Which means that the velocity of light changes in crystallographic direction, this is easily identifiable in thin section. Another optical property is birefringence (the difference between the two refractive indices, epsilon and omega ray). Gabrielite has very weak anisotropism which is the reason why gabrielite shows little to no birefringence. Mindat.org stated that the mineral gabrielite is not pleochroic (different wavelengths are absorbed in different directions, the color of the mineral varies when rotating the stage in plane polarized light).

Gabrielite is a sulfosalt mineral species occurring as idiomorphic crystals commonly found in cavities of Triassic dolomite. The physical properties of sulfosalts such as gabrielite, the mineral can be used for thermoelectric conducting, and magnetism.
