= Salzburgite =

General
- Category: Sulfosalt mineral
- Formula: Pb_{2}Cu_{2}Bi_{7}S_{12}
- IMA symbol: Szb
- Strunz classification: 2.HB.05a
- Crystal system: Orthorhombic
- Crystal class: Pyramidal (mm2); H-M symbol: (mm2)
- Space group: Pmc2_{1}

Identification

Salzburgite has a general empirical formula of Pb_{2}Cu_{2}Bi_{7}S_{12} and an orthorhombic crystal structure. This mineral is very similar to paarite in that they both have nearly the same empirical formulas. They are both of the bismuthinite - aikinite series. Salzburgite was named after the region in which it was found, Salzburg, Austria.
