= Tsugaruite =

Rare sulfosalt mineral

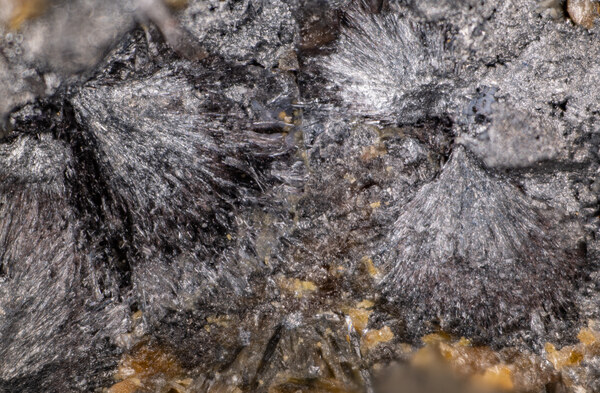
- Pb_{28}As_{15}S_{50}Cl

General
- Category: Sulfosalt mineral
- Formula: Pb_{28}As_{15}S_{50}Cl
- IMA symbol: Tsg
- Strunz classification: 2.JB.30
- Crystal system: Orthorhombic
- Space group: Pnn2 (space group 34)
- Unit cell: a = 8.0774(10) Å, b = 15.1772(16) Å, c = 38.129(4) Å; Z = 16

Identification
- Color: Lead-grey
- Crystal habit: Tabular
- Cleavage: None observed
- Fracture: Irregular/uneven
- Tenacity: Brittle
- Mohs scale hardness: 2.5 to 3
- Luster: Metallic
- Streak: Lead-grey
- Diaphaneity: Opaque
- Specific gravity: 6.83 (Calculated)
- Density: 6.83 g/cm3 (Calculated)
- Optical properties: Weakly bireflectant
- Pleochroism: Weakly pleochroic

Tsugaruite is a sulfosalt mineral with the chemical formula Pb_{28}As_{15}S_{50}Cl. It was first discovered in 1997 in a thin baryte veinlet at the Yunosawa mine in Ikarigaseki, Aomori. In 1998, the International Mineralogical Association approved it as a new mineral species. The mineral was named for its type locality's location in Japan's Tsugaru Peninsula.

When tsugaruite was originally discovered, its structure was uncertain and its chemical formula was believed to be Pb_{4}As_{2}S_{7}. Tsugaruite has a hardness of 2.5-3 on the Mohs scale and is described as "opaque with a metallic lustre and lead-grey streak". It is associated with jordanite and galena. The chemical similarity of tsugaruite to jordanite has caused confusion, resulting in earlier findings of tsugaruite being classified as jordanite. It is orthorhombic and occurs as radiating groups of tabular crystals. The structure is highly complex which is indicated by its large unit cell of 4674.3(9) Å^{3}. It is in space group Pnn2. Tsugaruite is recognized as the first lead-arsenic chloro-sulfosalt. Compared to jordanite, tsugaruite is slightly softer and darker, slightly greener, less pleochroic, and less anisotropic. Chlorine occupies a specific position in its structure. This was discovered using electron probe microanalysis. The atomic ratio of tsugaruite is close to that of other lead-antimony chloro-sulfosalts and just above the atomic ratio of dadsonite. Tsugaruite is found with jordanite but formed later. Due to its rarity, tsugarite is mostly studied for its mineralogical properties. Practical uses are still being researched, primarily with X-ray crystallography.

== See also ==
- List of minerals
