= Aktashite =

Arsenic sulfosalt mineral

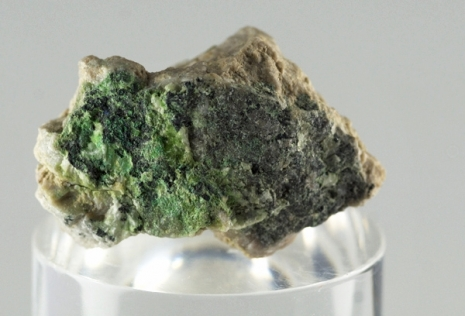
- Gray aktashite is richly dispersed on matrix

General
- Category: Sulfosalt
- Formula: Cu_{6}Hg_{3}As_{4}S_{12}
- IMA symbol: Ats
- Strunz classification: 2.GA.30
- Crystal system: Trigonal
- Crystal class: Pyramidal (3); H-M symbol: (3)
- Space group: R3

Identification
- Formula mass: 1667.51 g/mol

Aktashite is a rare arsenic sulfosalt mineral with formula Cu_{6}Hg_{3}As_{4}S_{12}. It is a copper mercury-bearing sulfosalt and is the only sulfosalt mineral with essential Cu and Hg yet known. It is of hydrothermal origin. It was published without approval of the IMA-CNMNC, but recognized as valid species by the IMA-CNMNC Sulfosalts Subcommittee (2008).
