= Xilingolite =

Lead sulfide material

General
- Category: Sulfosalt minerals
- Formula: Pb_{3}Bi_{2}S_{6}
- IMA symbol: Xil
- Strunz classification: 2.JB.40a
- Crystal system: Monoclinic
- Crystal class: Prismatic (2/m) (same H-M symbol)
- Space group: C2/m
- Unit cell: a = 13.65 Å, b = 4.07 Å c = 20.68 Å; β = 93°; Z = 4

Identification
- Formula mass: 1,231.96 g/mol
- Color: Lead grey
- Crystal habit: Elongated and striated prismatic crystals
- Twinning: On {001}
- Mohs scale hardness: 3 (calcite)
- Luster: Metallic
- Streak: Grey
- Diaphaneity: opaque
- Specific gravity: 7.08

Xilingolite is a lead sulfide mineral with formula Pb_{3}Bi_{2}S_{6}. It has a hardness of 3, a metallic luster, and usually exhibits a lead-grey color. It is a dimorph of lillianite, exhibiting increased Pb-Bi order and decreased symmetry.

Its crystal system is monoclinic, with three axes of unequal length two of which are at an oblique angle to each other while the third axis is perpendicular to the plane formed by the other two. Xilingolite is opaque, meaning that its internal structure does not allow for light to be transmitted through it. The mineral also exhibits white to blue-tinted-white pleochroism under reflected light.

== Discovery and occurrence ==
Xilingolite was first described in 1982 for an occurrence in an iron-rich skarn deposit in the Chaobuleng district of the Xilingoa League, Inner Mongolia Autonomous Region, China. Its name is derived from the locality in which it was originally found. Xilingolite is also known to occur in various localities in Valais, Switzerland. At the type locality it occurs associated with magnetite, sphalerite, pyrrhotite, pyrite, arsenopyrite, chalcopyrite, digenite, bornite, molybdenite, galena, native bismuth and bismuthinite.
