= Louis Caryl Graton =

Louis Caryl Graton (1880–1970), American geologist, chemist and educator, began his career in 1900 as assayer for Ledyard Gold Mines Ltd., near Rockdale, Ontario. He moved on to Canadian Goldfields Ltd. later in 1900, then entered McGill University as a graduate student, studying many of the famous mines of Ontario and Quebec. He continued his studies at Cornell University in 1902–1903.

In 1903, Graton was hired by Waldemar Lindgren of the US Geological Survey to assist Lindgren's restudy of the Cripple Creek, Colorado goldfields. This began an association that lasted until Lindgren's death in 1939. While at the USGS, he studied ore deposits in the southern Appalachians, New Mexico and California.

In 1909, Graton was appointed assistant professor of mining geology at Harvard; he advanced to full professor in 1912, a position he would hold for 37 years. Graton made important contributions in applying the science of geology to the practical job of finding ore. He was notably successful in "selling" geology to the mining industry, in an era when many companies doubted the value of employing mining geologists. He became professor emeritus in 1949.

Graton began a long association as a consultant for the Cerro Corporation (then the Cerro de Pasco Copper Corp.) in 1920. He was an active consultant until 1950. From 1945 to 1967 he served on the Cerro Board of Directors. For Cerro and other industrial clients, he set up modern geological departments and trained staff geologists to high professional standards.

L. C. Graton occupied a pre-eminent position in economic geology for half a century. He was president of the Society of Economic Geologists in 1931 (winning its Penrose Gold Medal in 1950), among many other awards and honors. He left a significant legacy of scientific papers and reviews. His bibliography is included in the Graton-Sales memorial volume, cited below.

== See also ==
- Gratonite, a mineral named to honor Graton.
