= Samsonite (mineral) =

Sulfosalt mineral Ag4MnSb2S6

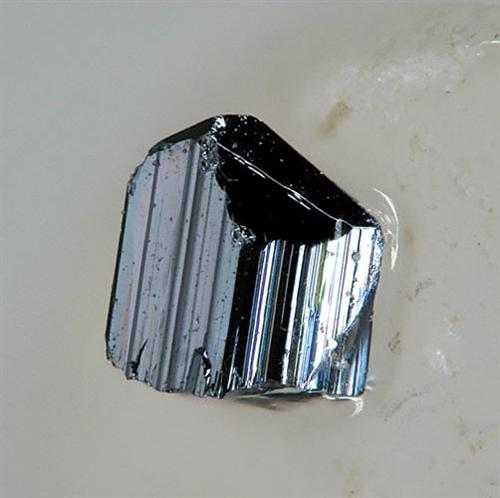
- Samsonite crystal from its type locality Samson Mine, St. Andreasberg, Harz, Germany

General
- Category: Sulfosalt minerals
- Formula: Ag_{4}MnSb_{2}S_{6}
- Strunz classification: 2.GA.15
- Crystal system: Monoclinic
- Crystal class: Prismatic (2/m) (same H-M symbol)
- Space group: P2_{1}/n
- Unit cell: a = 10.3861(6) Å b = 8.1108(7) Å c = 6.663(7) Å β = 92.639(12)°; Z = 2

Identification
- Color: Black
- Mohs scale hardness: 2 1/2
- Luster: Metallic
- Diaphaneity: Opaque
- Specific gravity: 5.461 (calculated)

Samsonite is a silver manganese antimony sulfosalt mineral with formula Ag_{4}MnSb_{2}S_{6}. It crystallizes in the monoclinic crystal system with a typical slender radiating prismatic habit. It is metallic black to steel black with no cleavage and a brittle to conchoidal fracture. In thin fragments it appears reddish brown in transmitted light and also leaves a red streak. It is soft, Mohs hardness of 2.5, and has a specific gravity of 5.51.

It was first named in 1910 after an occurrence in the Samson Vein of the Sankt Andreasberg silver mines, Harz Mountains, Germany.

== See also ==
- Classification of minerals
- List of minerals
- Samsonite (luggage brand)
