= Geocronite =

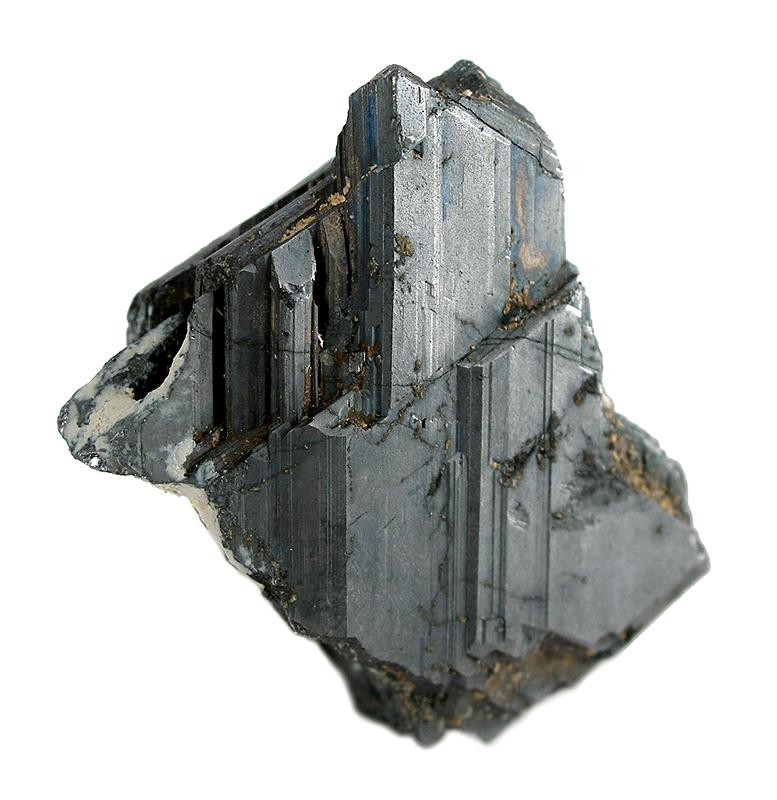

General
- Category: Sulfosalt minerals
- Formula: Pb_{14}(Sb, As)_{6}S_{23}
- IMA symbol: Geo
- Strunz classification: 2.JB.30a
- Crystal system: Monoclinic
- Crystal class: Prismatic (2/m) (same H-M symbol)
- Space group: P2_{1}/m

Geocronite is a mineral, a mixed sulfosalt containing lead, antimony, and arsenic with a formula of Pb_{14}(Sb, As)_{6}S_{23}. Geocronite is the antimony-rich endmember of a solid solution series. The arsenic-rich endmember is named jordanite. It occurs as grey, black, to silvery white monoclinic crystals. It is found in hydrothermal veins usually associated with other similar minerals, particularly the sulfides of iron and copper.

The mineral has been found in Spain, Ireland and Sweden where it was first identified in 1839.
