= Madocite =

General
- Category: Sulfosalt mineral
- Formula: Pb_{17}(Sb,As)_{16}S_{41}
- IMA symbol: Mdc
- Strunz classification: 2.LB.30
- Crystal system: Orthorhombic
- Crystal class: Pyramidal (mm2) (same H-M symbol)
- Space group: Pb2a
- Unit cell: a = 27.2 Å, b = 34.1 Å, c = 8.12 Å; Z = 4

Identification
- Color: Grayish black
- Crystal habit: Elongated and striated crystals; massive
- Cleavage: {010} Perfect
- Fracture: Conchoidal
- Mohs scale hardness: 3.25
- Luster: Metallic
- Streak: Grayish black, shining
- Diaphaneity: Opaque
- Specific gravity: 5.98
- Pleochroism: Strong, from white to gray

Madocite is a mineral with a chemical formula of Pb_{17}(Sb,As)_{16}S_{41}. Madocite was named for the locality of discovery, Madoc, Ontario, Canada. It is found in the marbles of the Precambrian Grenville Limestone. It is orthorhombic (rectangular prism with a rectangular base) and in the point group mm2. Its crystals are elongated and striated along [001] to a size of 1.5 mm.

Madocite is anisotropic and classified as having high relief. It also displays strong pleochroism.

Madocite is found in small clusters in marble pits (near Madoc, Ontario), and was originally categorized in the 1920s as an unidentified sulfosalt mineral in an assemblage of pyrite, sphalerite, and jamesonite in marble. Later research was done by John L. Jambor in the 1960s who went to the site and collected samples of the assemblages.
