= Tennantite =

Copper arsenic sulfosalt mineral

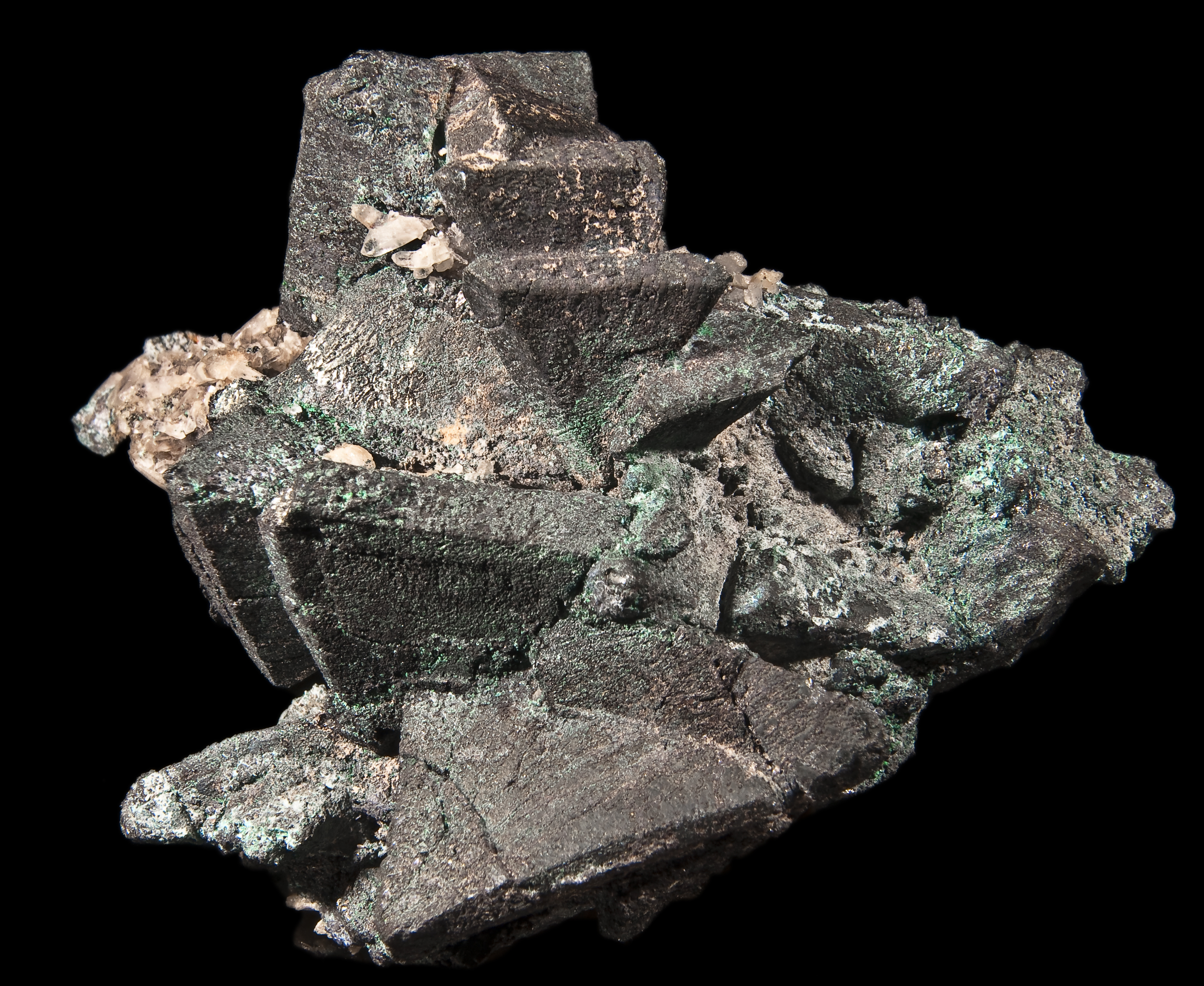

General
- Category: Sulfosalt minerals
- Formula: Cu_{6}[Cu_{4}(Fe,Zn)_{2}]As_{4}S_{13}
- Strunz classification: 2.GB.05
- Crystal system: Cubic
- Crystal class: Hextetrahedral (4̅3m); H-M symbol: (4̅ 3m)
- Space group: I4̅3m

Identification
- Color: Flint-gray to iron-black, cherry-red in transmitted light
- Crystal habit: massive to well formed crystals
- Twinning: Contact and penetration twins
- Cleavage: None
- Fracture: Subconchoidal to uneven
- Tenacity: Somewhat brittle
- Mohs scale hardness: 3 – 4.5
- Luster: Metallic, commonly splendent
- Streak: reddish gray
- Diaphaneity: Opaque, except in very thin fragments
- Specific gravity: 4.65
- Polish luster: gray, inclining to black to brown to cherry-red
- Optical properties: Isotropic
- Refractive index: n greater than 2.72

Tennantite is a copper arsenic sulfosalt mineral with an ideal formula Cu_{12}As_{4}S_{13}. Due to variable substitution of the copper by iron and zinc the formula is Cu_{6}[Cu_{4}(Fe,Zn)_{2}]As_{4}S_{13}. It is gray-black, steel-gray, iron-gray or black in color. A closely related mineral, tetrahedrite (Cu_{12}Sb_{4}S_{13}) has antimony substituting for arsenic and the two form a solid solution series. The two have very similar properties and is often difficult to distinguish between tennantite and tetrahedrite. Iron, zinc, and silver substitute up to about 15% for the copper site.

The mineral was first described for an occurrence in Cornwall, England in 1819, where it occurs as small crystals of cubic or dodecahedral form, and was named after the English chemist Smithson Tennant (1761–1815).

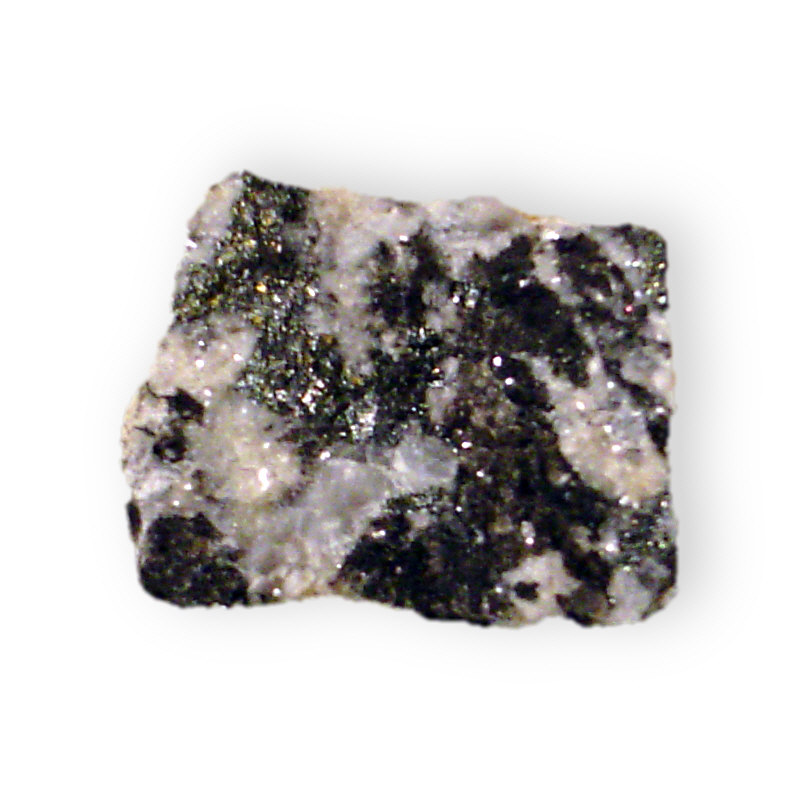
Tennantite from Ireland

It is found in hydrothermal veins and contact metamorphic deposits in association with other Cu–Pb–Zn–Ag sulfides and sulfosalts, pyrite, calcite, dolomite, siderite, barite, fluorite and quartz.

The arsenic component of tennantite causes the metal smelted from the ore to be harder than that of pure copper, because it is a copper-arsenic alloy. In the later 20th century, it was found that arsenical coppers had been more widely used in antiquity than had been previously realised, and it has been proposed that discoveries made by smelting ores like tennantite were significant steps in the progress towards the Bronze Age.

== See also ==
- List of minerals
- List of minerals named after people
