= Christite =

Mineral

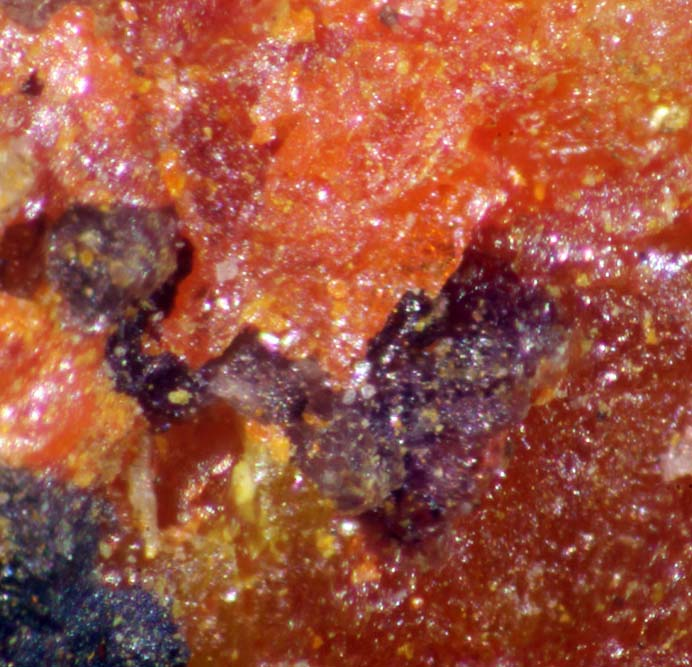
- Christite crystals

General
- Category: Sulfosalt mineral
- Formula: TlHgAsS_{3}
- IMA symbol: Cri
- Strunz classification: 2.HD.15
- Crystal system: Monoclinic
- Crystal class: Prismatic (2/m) (same H-M symbol)
- Space group: P2_{1}/n
- Unit cell: a = 6.113 Å, b = 16.188 Å, c = 6.111 Å; β = 96.71°; V = 600.59 Å^{3}; Z = 4

Identification
- Formula mass: 576.09 g/mol
- Color: Crimson red, bright orange.
- Crystal habit: Subhedral grains, may be somewhat bladed or flattened
- Cleavage: {010} and {110} perfect, {101} good
- Fracture: Uneven
- Mohs scale hardness: 1-2
- Luster: Adamantine
- Streak: light orange
- Diaphaneity: opaque to semitransparent
- Specific gravity: 6.2
- Optical properties: Biaxial
- Pleochroism: Weak to strong, grayish green, dark violet, bluish violet

Christite is a mineral with the chemical formula TlHgAsS_{3}. It is named after Dr. Charles L. Christ, a member of the U.S. Geological Survey. It usually comes in a crimson red or bright orange color. It has a density of 6.2 and has a rating between 1 and 2 on Mohs Hardness Scale. Christite has an adamantine luster and leaves behind an orange streak. Its crystal system is monoclinic with possible crystal classes of twofold symmetry, mirror plane symmetry, and twofold with a mirror plane. This means it can have radial symmetry, mirror plane symmetry, or mirror plane symmetry perpendicular to the two-fold axis. It is an anisotropic mineral, which means that it exhibits different properties when measured in different directions. In plane polarized light, its color is golden yellow. It is birefringent, which means that it has two distinct indices of refraction. This can be seen when one looks through the microscope with both polars crossed and sees the mineral change colors when it is rotated.

== Occurrence ==
Christite occurs with baryte in hydrothermal veins in dolomite at the Carlin mine in Nevada and in pods within a mercury deposit, the Lanmuchang deposit, China. It occurs associate with realgar, orpiment, lorandite, baryte and getchellite at the Carlin mine and with lorandite, baryte, pyrite and marcasite in the Lanmuchang.
