= József Sándor Krenner =

Hungarian mineralogist

József Sándor Krenner or Joseph Krenner (3 March 1839 – 6 January 1920) was a Hungarian mineralogist. He discovered several new minerals.

Krenner was born in Buda and studied at the University of Pest, Vienna and Tübingen mineralogy and geology. He received his Ph.D. in 1865 for work with Friedrich August Quenstedt in Tübingen. Krenner worked in the mineralogy section of the Hungarian National Museum. From 1870 on he also lectured at the Technical University of Budapest. In 1888 he became a member of the Hungarian Academy of Science. Krenner discovered several new minerals, for example, Krennerite which he discovered in 1877 in Sacaramb, Romania. The mineral is obviously named after himself. Another mineral he discovered was Semseyite, the lead antimony sulfide discovered in 1881 was named after Andor Semsey (1833–1923), a Hungarian nobleman and mineralogist. He also discovered and described kornelite (1888), szomolnokite (1891) and rhomboclase (1891), all hydrated iron sulfates from Szomolnok (present-day Smolník, Slovakia).
