= Arcubisite =

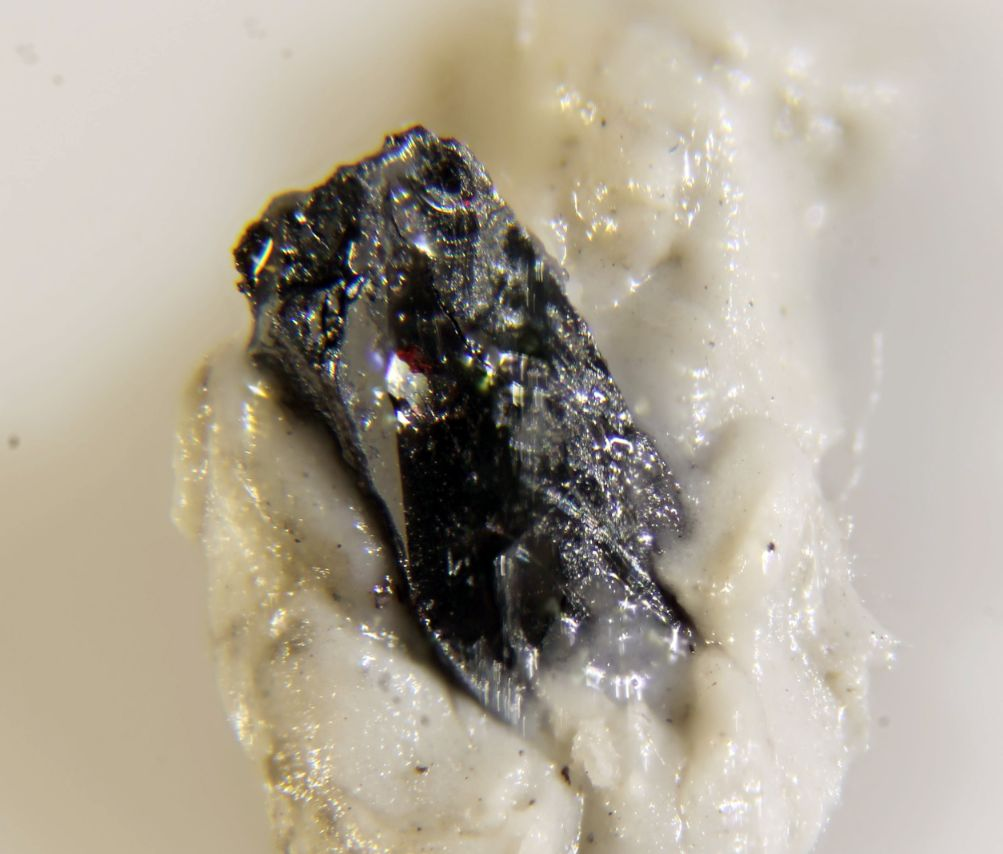
- Arcubisite found in Greenland

General
- Category: Minerals
- Formula: (Ag_{6}CuBiS_{4})
- IMA symbol: Acb

Identification
- Color: Grey
- Luster: Metallic

Arcubisite (Ag_{6}CuBiS_{4}) is a sulfosalt mineral occurring with cryolite in Greenland. It is named after its composition (ARgentum, CUprum, and BISmuth). Its IMA symbol is Acb.
