= Fangite =

Sulfosalt

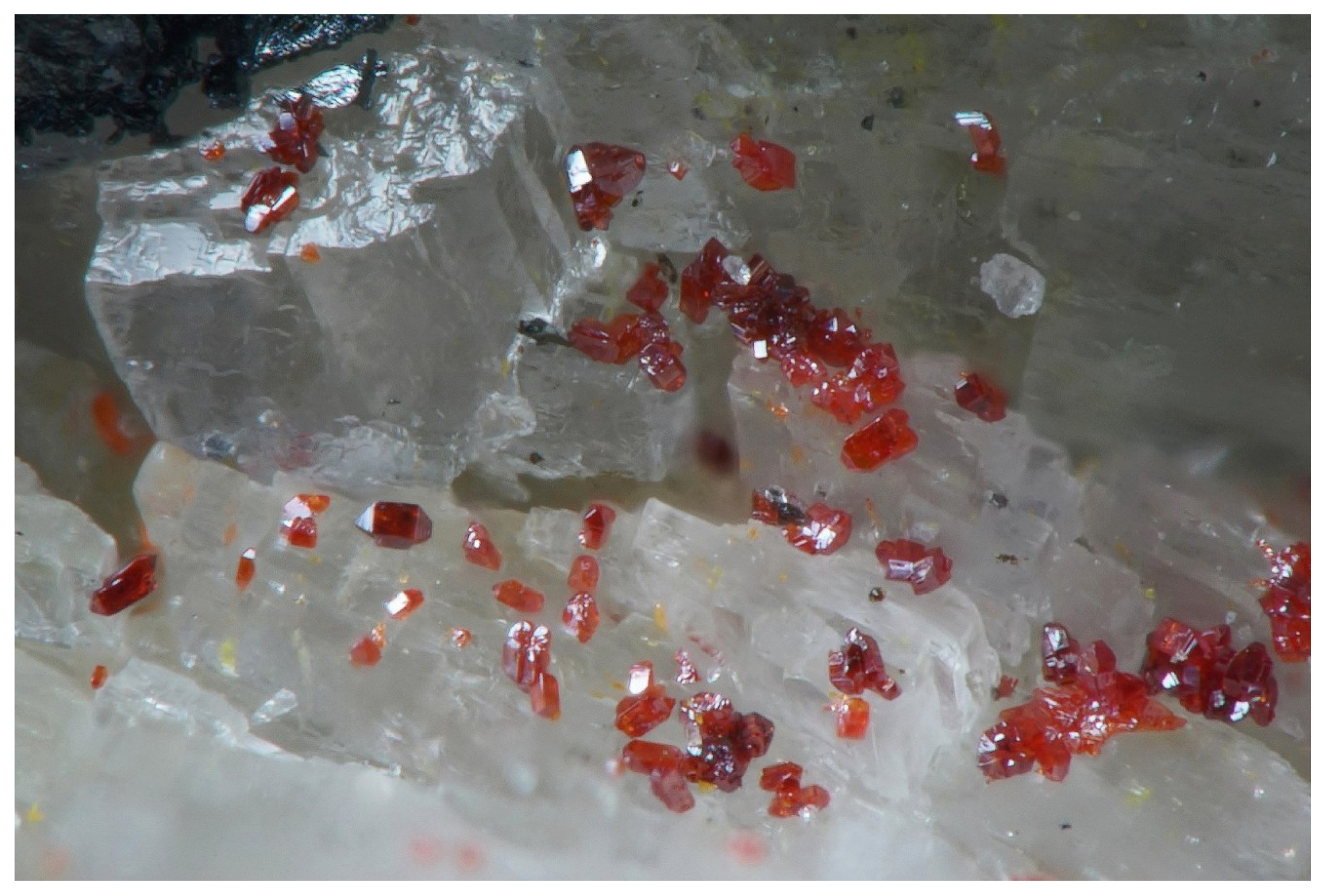

General
- Category: Sulfosalt
- Formula: Tl_{3}AsS_{4}
- IMA symbol: Fg
- Strunz classification: 2.Ka.15
- Crystal system: Orthorhombic
- Crystal class: 2/m 2/m 2/m - Dipyramidal
- Space group: Pnma
- Unit cell: a = 8.894(8) Å, b = 10.855(9) Å c = 9.079(9) Å; Z = 4

Identification
- Formula mass: 816.3315
- Color: Deep red, maroon
- Mohs scale hardness: 2-2.5
- Luster: Vitreous, metallic
- Streak: Orange
- Diaphaneity: Transparent
- Density: 6.185 g/cm^{3}
- Polish luster: Blue-gray
- Birefringence: Very low
- Dispersion: Relatively strong

Fangite is a sulfosalt first discovered in the Mercur gold deposit located in Tooele County Utah. The specimen was found in a boulder in the southern Oquirrh Mountains. The only available specimens of fangite are located in the National Museum of Natural History, Smithsonian Institution. The International Mineralogical Association Commission approved the name Fangite after Dr. Jen-Ho Fang, a crystal chemist affiliated with the University of Alabama, in honor of his significant contributions to crystallography, crystal chemistry, and geostatistics.

== Occurrence ==
Fangite was detected in an isolated vug of sulfide ore stockpile within the Morrin Hill pit at the Mercur gold deposit. Fangite is associated with subhedral pyrite and fine-grained sulfide indicating partial replacement of pyrite, sphalerite, and other sulfide minerals. Based on surrounding materials, it can be concluded that Fangite forms as a result of alteration of thallium sulfates or by substituting fluids that are Ti-rich for realgar or orpiment.

== Physical properties ==
Fangite is a deep red to maroon, transparent mineral with a vitreous luster and a metallic luster when tarnished. The original sample of fangite was too small to determine hardness. Synthetic Tl_{3}AsS_{4} exhibits a hardness of 2-2.5 on the Mohs hardness scale and a density of 6.185 g/cm^{3}. Synthetic Tl_{3}AsS_{4} was also used for assessing streak, revealing an orange color. Fangite exhibits a blue-gray luster with low birefringence and red internal reflections when polished. Due to no well-formed crystals in the original specimen collected, cleavage could not be determined. However, synthetic fangite exhibits conchoidal fracture.

== Optical properties ==
Fangite has a vitreous luster that turns metallic when tarnished. When examining fangite in a polished section, only one grain could be used to test optical properties due to the abundant presence of internal red reflections. Due to the angles of fracture in synthetic material, grains are present that reflect away unwanted components. It is concluded that fangite has a very low birefringence with a difference of Y% of 0.4. The consistent decrease in reflectance from the blue to red end of the visible spectrum aligns with the blue-gray appearance of fangite in polished sections. This appearance corresponds to its red and translucent characteristics in hand specimen or thin section. Comparing these reflectance spectra with those in the Quantitative Data File for ore minerals reveals similarities between R1 and R2 of fangite and the R2 values of proustite (Ag_{3}AsS_{3}). However, proustite is distinctly bireflectant and appears more purplish-red due to its somewhat higher reflectance at the blue end of the spectrum.

== Structure ==
The ideal chemical formula for fangite is Tl_{3}AsS_{4}. When examining the crystal structure of fangite along the a-axis, it is apparent that fangite exhibits a polyhedral arrangement. Arsenic (As) atoms in this orientation display perfect tetrahedral coordination with Sulfur (S) featuring an average bond length of 2.172 Å. A distorted trigonal dipyramid with an average bond length of 3.17 Å is formed with the Thallium (Tl) atom, coordinated in a fivefold manner with S. The Thallium (Tl) atom is also coordinated sevenfold with Sulfur (S), creating a monocapped octahedron with an average bond length of 3.288 Å. Chains, comprising alternating Tl_{2} dipyramids and As tetrahedra, are linked through corner-sharing at S1 and S2. These chains align parallel to the c axis, and the structure repeats with each alternating chain undergoing a 180° rotation and shifting up and down the A axis. Fangite has an ideal chemical formula of Tl_{3}AsS_{4}. When examining an isolated chain from the b-axis, it is apparent that the previously described chain is a Tl_{2}-As polyhedral layer. This layer consists of Tl_{2} trigonal dipyramids arranged in zigzag chains along the a-axis, connected in the c-direction by As tetrahedra. These tetrahedra share an edge and two vertices with the dipyramids, creating nearly planar Tl_{2}-As polyhedral layers aligned with the (010) plane. The linkage between these layers is in the b-direction by interlayer Tl atoms.

== Chemical composition ==
Oxide	wt%	Range
Th	75.7	74.6-76.8
As	9.16	9.10-9.20
S	15.6	15.5-15.8
Total	100.46	99.2-101.8

== X-ray crystallography ==
X-ray diffraction was collected from synthetic fangite using a Gondolfi pattern, using an automated powder diffractometer. Synthetic material was supplied by M. Gottlieb, associated with the Westinghouse Research Laboratories in Pittsburgh, Pennsylvania. Through analysis, it is concluded that fangite is a part of the orthorhombic crystal system with a space group of Pnma. Unit cell, dimensions were also analyzed, revealing: a=8.894(8) Å, b=10.855(9) Å, c=9.079(9) Å, z=4.

== See also ==
List of Minerals
