= Andorite =

Sulfosalt mineral

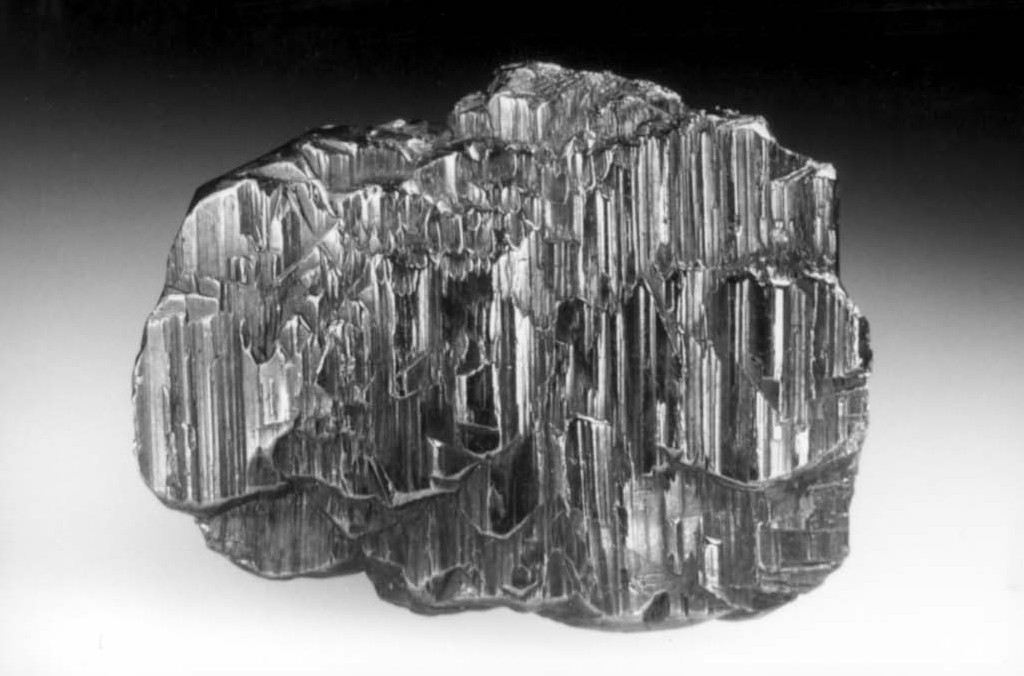
- Andorite – Itos Mine, Oruro City, Cercado Province, Bolivia. Specimen height is 4.1 cm.

General
- Category: Sulfosalt mineral
- Formula: PbAgSb_{3}S_{6}
- IMA symbol: Ado
- Strunz classification: 2.JB.40a
- Crystal system: Orthorhombic
- Crystal class: Pyramidal (mm2); H-M symbol: (mm2)
- Space group: Pn2_{1}a (andorite VI, senandorite)
- Unit cell: a = 12.99, b = 19.14, c = 4.3 [Å]; Z = 4

Identification
- Color: Dark steel-gray, may tarnish yellow or iridescent; white in polished section
- Crystal habit: Crystals stout prismatic to tabular on {100}, striations parallel to [001]; massive
- Twinning: On {110}
- Cleavage: none observed
- Fracture: conchoidal
- Mohs scale hardness: 3 – 3.5
- Luster: metallic
- Streak: Black
- Diaphaneity: Opaque
- Specific gravity: 5.33 – 5.37
- Optical properties: anisotropic

Andorite is a sulfosalt mineral with the chemical formula PbAgSb_{3}S_{6}.

It was first described in 1892 for an occurrence in the Baia Sprie mine, Baia Sprie, in what is now Maramureș County, Romania, and named for Hungarian amateur mineralogist Andor von Semsey (1833–1923). Andorite occurs in low-temperature polymetallic hydrothermal veins. It occurs associated with stibnite, sphalerite, baryte, fluorite, siderite, cassiterite, arsenopyrite, stannite, zinkenite, tetrahedrite, pyrite, alunite, quartz, pyrargyrite, stephanite and rhodochrosite.
