= Plumosite =

Questionable sulfosalt mineral

Plumosite is a questionable mineral. Most of the time, it can refer to any feather ore, i.e. any ore that forms fine capillaries within the surrounding rock.

Older specimens could be either boulangerite, jamesonite or zinkenite (Pb_{2}Sb_{2}S_{5}, sulfosalt mineral).
