= Aleksite =

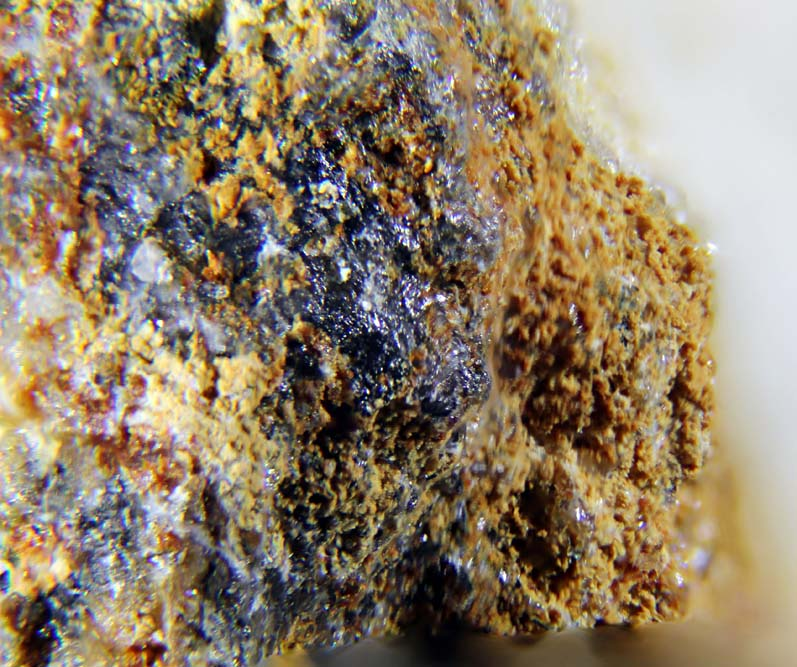
- Alkesite on matrix

General
- Category: sulfosalt mineral
- Formula: PbBi2Te2S2
- Crystal system: Trigonal
- Crystal class: 3m
- Space group: P3̅m1 (no. 164)

Identification
- Mohs scale hardness: 2.5
- Luster: metallic
- Streak: pale green
- Specific gravity: 7.80

Aleksite (IMA symbol: Alk) is a rare lead bismuth tellurium sulfosalt mineral with formula PbBi_{2}Te_{2}S_{2}.
