= Fettelite =

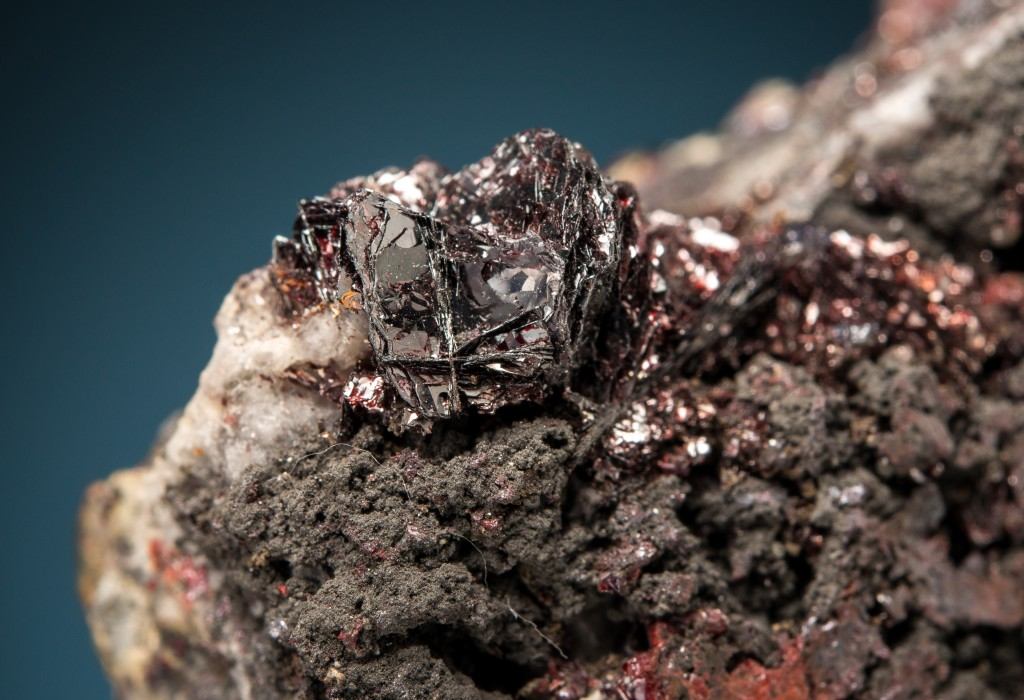
- Cluster of tiny fettelite crystals in a vug from Copiapó, Atacama Region, Chile

General
- Category: Sulfosalt mineral
- Formula: Ag^{1+}_{16}Hg^{2+}As^{3+}_{4}S^{2-}_{15} (rruff) or [Ag_{6}As_{2}S_{7}][Ag_{10}HgAs_{2}S_{8}] (mindat.org)
- IMA symbol: Ftt
- Strunz classification: 2.LA.30
- Crystal system: Monoclinic
- Crystal class: Sphenoidal (2) (same H-M symbol)
- Space group: C2
- Unit cell: a = 15.00, c = 15.46 [Å] V = 3014 Å^{3}; Z = 8

Identification
- Color: dark violet to red
- Crystal habit: flakes, hexagonal, micaceous
- Twinning: intimately twinned with six twin domains
- Cleavage: perfect
- Fracture: subconchoidal
- Mohs scale hardness: 3.5
- Luster: metallic
- Streak: dark vermillion
- Diaphaneity: subopaque to opaque
- Specific gravity: 6.29
- Optical properties: Biaxial, anisotrophism weak with strong red internal reflections
- Refractive index: N(calc) = 1.74
- Birefringence: moderate white to brownish gray

Fettelite, also known as sanguinite, is a mercury-sulfosalt mineral with the chemical formula Ag_{16}HgAs_{4}S_{15}. The mineral was first described by Wang and Paniagua (1996) who named it after M. Fettel, a German field geologist who collected the first samples from Odenwald. It was first collected in the Nieder-Beerbach mine, 10 km south of Darmstadt, Odenwald, Germany. Its normal occurrence is in hydrothermal veins, which can cut gabbro-diorite intrusives. It is closely related to other rare minerals like dervillite, daomanite, vaughanite and criddleite which are also found in the same type locality as fettelite.

Fettelite occurs as clusters of hexagonal flakes. These flakes can get up to 0.2 mm across and around 5-10 μm thick. In more complex hexagonal tablets, somewhat larger sub parallel aggregates can be measured. The birefringence of Fettelite is moderate white to grayish brown.
