= Gerhard vom Rath =

German mineralogist

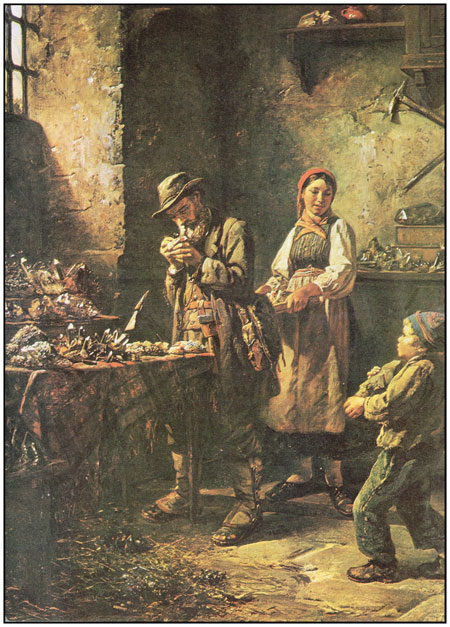
Der Mineraloge (The Mineralogist) by Raphael Ritz, 1883. Thought to depict the Bonn mineralogist Gerhard vom Rath (1830–1888), examining mineral specimens from Lengenbach in a nearby house in Binn, Switzerland

Gerhard vom Rath (20 August 1830 – 23 April 1888), was a German mineralogist, born at Duisburg in Prussia.

== Biography ==
Rath was educated at Cologne, at Bonn University, and finally at Berlin, where he graduated Ph.D. in 1853. In 1856 he became assistant to Johann Jakob Nöggerath in the mineralogical museum at Bonn, and succeeded to the directorship in 1872. Meanwhile, in 1863 he was appointed extraordinary professor of geology, and in 1872 he became professor of geology and mineralogy in the university at Bonn.

He was distinguished for his accurate researches on mineralogy and crystallography; he described a great many new minerals, some of which were discovered by him, and he contributed largely to our knowledge of other minerals, notably in an essay on tridymite. He travelled much in southern Europe, Palestine and the United States, and wrote several essays on petrology, geology and physical geography, on earthquakes and on meteorites. He died at Koblenz in 1888.

== Work ==
Rath published the results of his researches in Poggendorf's Annalen der Physik und Chemie, in the Zeitschrift der deutschen geologischen Gesellschaft, and in the Monatsberichten of the Berlin Academy. Among his own publications were:

- Ein Ausflug nach Kalabrien (Bonn 1871)
- Der Monzoni im südlichen Tirol (1875)
- Siebenbürgen (Heidelberg 1880)
- Durch Italien und Griechenland nach dem heiligen Land, Reisebriefe (Heidelberg 1882, 2 vols.)
- Arizona (Heidelberg 1885)
- Pennsylvanien (Heidelberg 1888)
- Über den Granit (Berlin. 1878)
- Über das Gold (Berlin 1879)
- Naturwissenschaftliche Studien. Erinnerungen an die Pariser Weltausstellung (Bonn 1879).
