= Gratonite =

Sulfosalt mineral

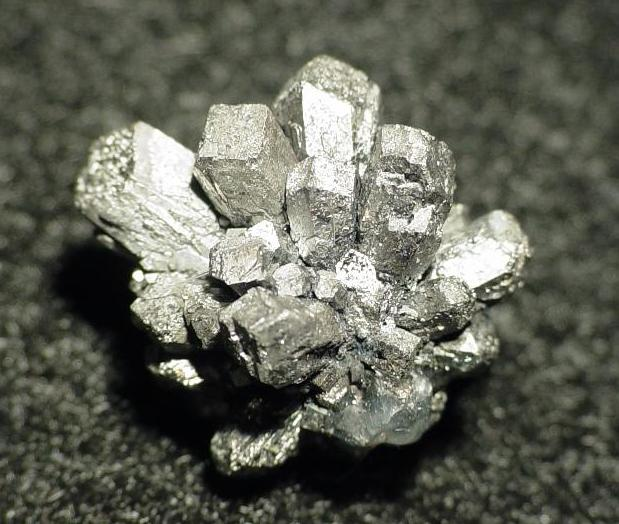
- Gratonite, Excelsior Mine, Cerro de Pasco, Peru, the type locality. 1.7 x 1.6 x 1.5 cm.

General
- Category: Sulfosalt minerals
- Formula: Pb_{9}As_{4}S_{15}
- IMA symbol: Gtn
- Strunz classification: 2.JB.55
- Crystal system: Trigonal
- Crystal class: Ditrigonal pyramidal (3m) (same H-M symbol)
- Space group: R3m

Gratonite is a lead-arsenic sulfosalt mineral, with the chemical composition Pb_{9}As_{4}S_{15}. It is considered a low-temperature dimorph of jordanite. Gratonite was discovered in 1939 at the Excelsior Mine, Cerro de Pasco, Peru. It is named in honor of geologist L. C. Graton (1880–1970), who had a long-standing association with the Cerro de Pasco mines. The other location where it is found is the Rio Tinto mine, Minas de Riotinto (Huelva), Spain. The crystals are very similar to those from Cerro de Pasco.
