= Boulangerite =

Sulfosalt mineral: lead antimony sulfide

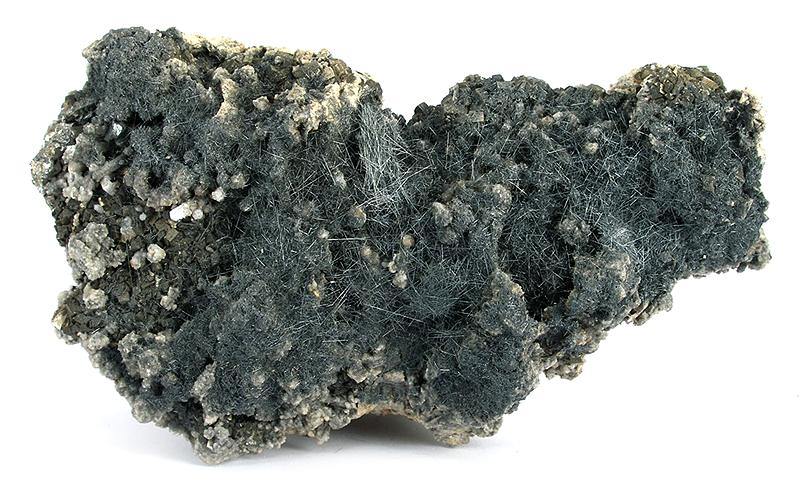
- Boulangerite, covering a block of limestone

General
- Category: Sulfosalt minerals
- Formula: Pb_{5}Sb_{4}S_{11}
- IMA symbol: Bou
- Strunz classification: 2.HC.15
- Crystal system: Orthorhombic
- Crystal class: Dipyramidal (mmm); H-M symbol: (2/m 2/m 2/m)
- Space group: Pnam
- Unit cell: 4,027.99

Identification
- Cleavage: Good; Distinct on {100} Indistinct on {001} and {010}
- Fracture: Brittle
- Tenacity: Brittle
- Mohs scale hardness: 2.5–3
- Luster: Metallic
- Streak: Reddish brown to black
- Density: 5.9–6.2
- Pleochroism: Weak
- Ultraviolet fluorescence: None
- Melting point: Around 525 °C
- Fusibility: Around 525 °C
- Solubility: Completely soluble in hydrochloric acid Partially soluble in nitric acid
- Common impurities: Cu, Zn, Sn, Fe

Boulangerite or antimonbleiblende is an uncommon monoclinic orthorhombic sulfosalt mineral, lead antimony sulfide, formula Pb_{5}Sb_{4}S_{11}. It was named in 1837 in honor of French mining engineer Charles Boulanger (1810–1849), and had been a valid species since pre-IMA. It was first described prior to 1959, and is now grandfathered.

== Properties ==
Boulangerite was considered to be a really rare mineral until later they found numerous ore deposits of said mineral. Nowadays it is considered as an uncommon mineral, which is rather cheap, with a color of light blue to black to grey. The dust of the mineral is black. Pseudohexagonal shape is common for this mineral. It forms rings rarely. It is the homeotype of lopatkaite. The strong subcell is orthorhombic, and has a halved c. It forms small, elongated prismic or fine, needle-like crystals. Each crystal can grow up to a few centimeters, and crystals can only be told apart in either an enlarged photo or from under a microscope, as it is almost as thin and fine as hair is. One of its unique properties is the parallel fibers to the direction of the elongation, although fibrous-radial, feathery masses are not uncommon as well. In other words, it is plumose, meaning aggregates form plume-like shapes. The latter is the so-called plumosite variant of the mineral, the name derived from the aggregates being plumose, though it can occur in felt-like fibrous or in thick granular clusters as well. The luster of it is always either matte blueish-grey or metallic lead-grey. It is a really heavy, though soft mineral, which is easily breakable, though it cannot be scratched by using fingernails due to the same hardness (2.5–3). The mineral being heavy although being soft is due to its compact mass. The cleavage is generally good. In case of the fibrous type, the fibers are flexible. It is an opaque mineral. The melting point of it is really low, 1 on the Kobell fusibility-scale, which is around 525 in °C. This is the point, where the mineral is the easiest to fuse or at which temperature it melts. It is completely soluble in hydrogen chloride. During the reaction with hydrochloric acid, it creates hydrogen sulfide. In nitric acid, it is partially soluble. It has a distinct anisotropism, and shows weak pleochroic attributes. Common impurities include iron, copper, tin and zinc. It mostly consists of lead (54.88%) thus it can be used as a lead ore, but the other main components are antimony (26.44%) (which is also why the mineral typically forms in antimony deposits) and sulfur (18.68%).

== Formation ==
It typically forms in association of lead, zinc or antimony deposits, in a lodeic environment. It can also be found in company of metamorphic rocks as well, in the Apuan alps as well for instance. The specimens that get formed on these metamorphic rocks appear in the form of fine, crystal needles. It is also usually found with other sulfides as well, like with arsenopyrite, pyrrhotite, galena or sphalerite, but is also can occur with siderites, dolomites and quartzes. It may occur in intergrowths with jamesonite and meneghinite, quartz or sphalerite. Usual finding places include Germany, Switzerland, Canada, the Czech republic, the old Yugoslavia, the Ural region in Russia, and from the british park city mines in Utah. The most known finding places include the Gutin mountains, more specifically Herja, Baia Mare, Baia Sprie, although it appears in greater quantities at the Slovak Ore Mountains (Spišsko-gemerské rudohorie), specifically Čučma and Zlatá Idka. A small few specimens can be found in Hungary, in the Gyöngyösoroszi ore mine, in French at Provence, and as mentioned above, in Italy, it can be found in the tuscan Apuan alps, in the Bottino mine, but it rarely occurs in carrara marble as well.

== Identification and usage ==
At first glance, it is hard to differentiate boulangerite from zinkenite or jamesonite, so proper equipment is crucial for the identification. In the structure, there are interconnected SbS_{3} groups like in zinkenite, jamesonite and robinsonite. The smaller, and beautiful needle-like crystals attract a lot of collector's glimpses. As for the economical usage of boulangerite, it can be used up as a lead ore. The usage of said mineral is only reasonable when it appears in extended enough, quarriable deposits.
