= Takarada =

Takarada is a surname. Notable people with the surname include:

- Akira Takarada (1934–2022), Japanese actor
- Saori Takarada (born 1999), Japanese footballer
