= Sarabauite =

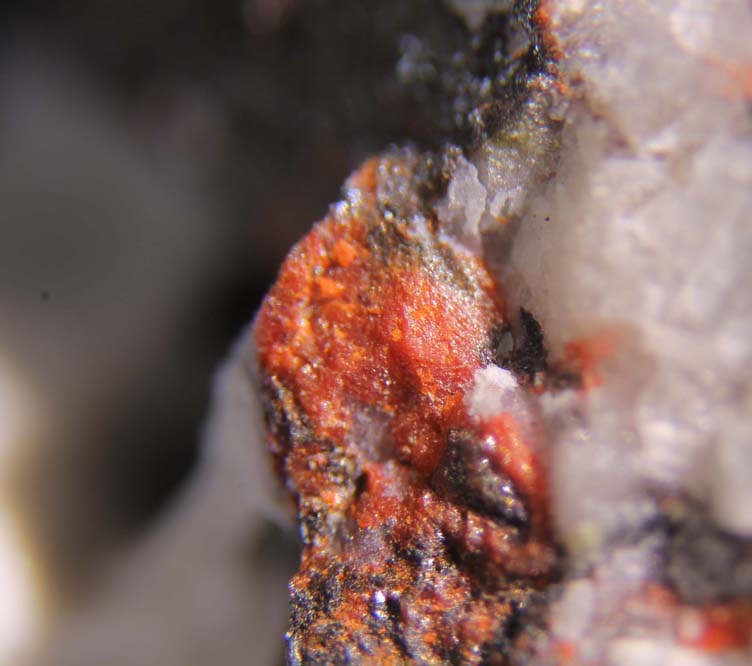
- Sarabauite from its type locality, the Sarabau Mine in Malaysia

General
- Category: Sulfide mineral
- Formula: CaSb_{10}O_{10}S_{6}
- IMA symbol: Sbu
- Strunz classification: 2.MA.10
- Crystal system: Monoclinic
- Crystal class: Prismatic (2/m) (same H-M symbol)
- Space group: C2/c
- Unit cell: a = 25.37 Å, b = 5.65 Å c = 16.87 Å; β = 117.58°; Z = 4

Identification
- Color: Carmine red
- Crystal habit: Red tabular crystals
- Cleavage: None
- Fracture: Conchoidal
- Tenacity: Somewhat sectile
- Mohs scale hardness: 4
- Luster: Resinous
- Streak: Orange
- Diaphaneity: Translucent
- Specific gravity: 4.8
- Optical properties: Biaxial (–)
- Pleochroism: x is reddish yellow; y is brownish red

Sarabauite (sar-a-bau'-ite) is a red monoclinic sulfide mineral with the chemical formula: CaSb_{10}O_{10}S_{6}.

== Origin of name and type locality ==
Sarabauite was first described in 1977 and named for its type locality, the Sarabau Mine (Lucky Hill mine) in Sarawak, Malaysia. It has also been reported from the Castelo Branco District of Portugal.

== Crystallography ==
Sarabauite is a monoclinic mineral. Monoclinic minerals have three crystallographic axes of unequal length. Two of the inter-axial angles are 90 degrees, while the third angle, between the optic axis and the plane containing the other two axes, is unequal to the other inter-axial angles. The monoclinic system includes crystal classes with a single twofold rotation axis and/or a mirror plane. Sarabauite is of the 2/m crystal class; it has a 2 fold rotation axis perpendicular to a mirror plane.

== Optical properties ==
Sarabauite is a biaxial negative mineral. All minerals of the monoclinic, orthorhombic, and triclinic systems are biaxial minerals. Unlike uniaxial minerals, biaxial crystals have 2 optic axes. This means they have two directions in which light can travel without birefringence, three principal axes, and accordingly three different indices of refraction. Biaxial minerals are further subdivided by optic sign. The optic angle, 2V, is the angle between the two optic axes that is split by the direction of the lowest index of refraction. If 2V is acute, the mineral is biaxial positive. In sarabauite crystals this angle is obtuse, thus the mineral is biaxial negative.

== Geologic setting ==
The mining region that contains the Sarabau Mine is part of the Sumatra Orogen. The region consists of a system of faults and joints through which hydrothermal fluids responsible for the mineralization of sarabauite rise into the overlying carbonate rock.

== Mineral importance ==
Sarabauite is a notable mineral for its antimony content, fluid inclusions, accompaniment of gold, and its two-stage hydrothermal formation process. The Sarabau Mine is a gold and antimony mine. Sarabauite can be found there in mineral veins through altered limestone containing quartz, wollastonite, calcite, stibnite and senarmonite. Both temperature and fluids are responsible for its formation through a two-stage hydrothermal mineralization process. First, wollastonite, diopside, and epidote form at temperatures over 400 °C. In the second stage, at over 377 °C, sarabauite and native gold develop. Calcite, stibnite, and senarmontite also form during the second stage as the mineralization cools further to 377–194 °C. Sarabauite's formation makes it the only hypogene antimony mineral whose fluid inclusions can be studied in thin section under normal light.
