= Chalcostibite =

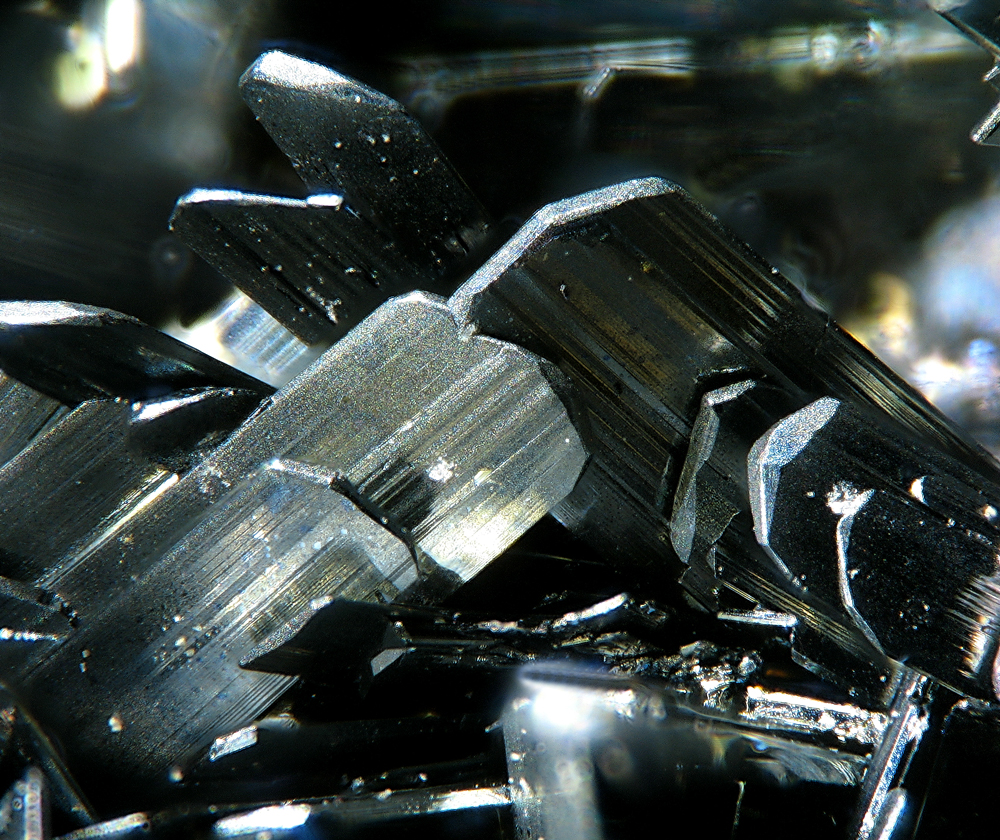

General
- Category: Chalcostibite Group
- Formula: CuSbS_{2}
- IMA symbol: Ccsb
- Strunz classification: 02.HA.05
- Dana classification: 03.07.05.01
- Crystal system: Orthorhombic
- Space group: Pnam (no. 62)

Identification
- Colour: Lead-gray, iron gray
- Crystal habit: Granular
- Cleavage: (001)
- Fracture: Sub-Conchoidal
- Tenacity: Brittle
- Mohs scale hardness: 3–4
- Luster: Metallic
- Streak: Black
- Diaphaneity: Opaque
- Specific gravity: 4.9 – 5
- Density: 4.9 – 5 g/cm^{3} (Measured) 5.011 g/cm^{3} (Calculated)
- Pleochroism: Weak
- Ultraviolet fluorescence: Non-fluorescent
- References: ,

Chalcostibite is a copper antimony sulfide mineral.

Příbramite is related, having selenium instead of sulfur. Emplectite contains bismuth instead of antimony.

== Occurrences ==
- Argentina
  - Salta Province
    - Los Andes department
      - San Antonio de los Cobres
        - Organullo mining district
          - Julio Verne mine
- Australia
  - New South Wales
    - Sandon Co.l
      - Hillgrove
- Austria
  - Carinthia
    - Völkermarkt District
      - Rammersdorf
        - Dragonerfels
          - Modre quarry
    - Wolfsberg District
      - Bad Sankt Leonhard im Lavanttal
        - Kliening
          - Mischlinggraben
          - Staubmann Mines
  - Salzburg
    - Zell am See District
      - Rauris
        - Hochtor area
          - Silver mines (Knappenstube)
  - Styria
    - Murtal District
      - Pölstal
        - Oberzeiring
  - Tyrol
    - Murtal District
      - Pölstal
        - Oberzeiring

== See also ==
- List of minerals
