= Teallite =

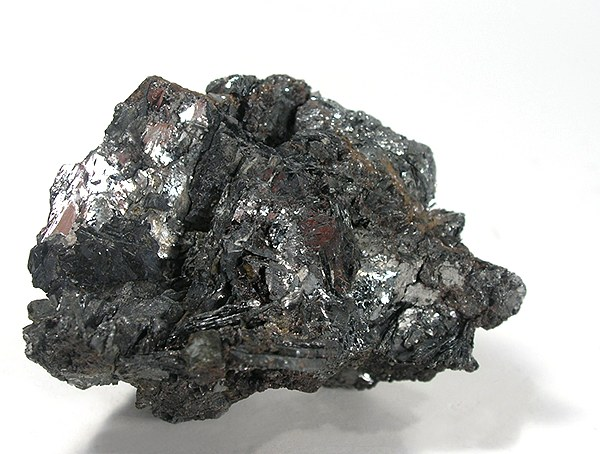

General
- Category: Sulfide minerals
- Formula: PbSnS_{2}
- IMA symbol: Tel
- Strunz classification: 2.CD.05
- Crystal system: Orthorhombic
- Crystal class: Dipyramidal (mmm); H-M symbol: (2/m 2/m 2/m)
- Space group: Pbnm (no. 62)
- Unit cell: a = 4.26 Å, b = 11.41 Å c = 4.09 Å; Z = 2

Identification
- Color: Silvery gray, lead-gray to iron-gray; tarnishes dull or iridescent
- Cleavage: {001} perfect (lamellar cleavage); flexible
- Tenacity: Malleable
- Mohs scale hardness: 1 1/2 – 2
- Luster: Metallic
- Streak: Black
- Diaphaneity: Opaque
- Specific gravity: 6.36
- Optical properties: Anisotropic
- Pleochroism: Weak

Teallite is a sulfide mineral of tin and lead with chemical formula: PbSnS_{2}. It occurs in hydrothermal veins and is sometimes mined as an ore of tin. Teallite forms soft silvery grey mica-like plates and crystallizes in the orthorhombic system. The Mohs hardness is 1.5 to 2 and the specific gravity is 6.4.

Teallite was first described in 1904 from its type locality in Santa Rosa, Antequera, Bolivia. It was named for the British geologist Jethro Justinian Harris Teall (1849–1924).

== See also ==
- Classification of minerals
- List of minerals
- List of minerals named after people
