= Seligmannite =

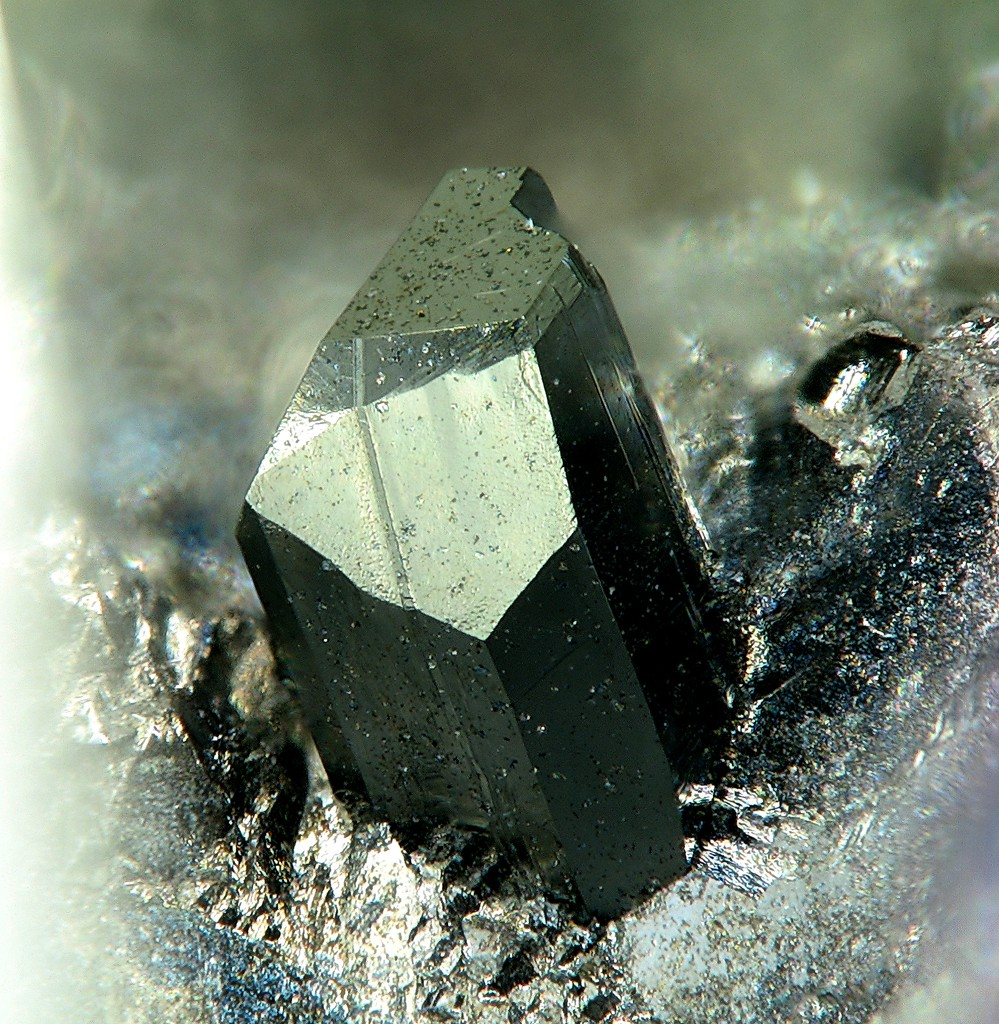
- Seligmannite from Palomo mine, Castrovirreyna Province, Huancavelica Department, Peru

General
- Category: Sulfide minerals
- Formula: PbCuAsS_{3}
- IMA symbol: Seli
- Strunz classification: 2.GA.50
- Crystal system: Orthorhombic
- Crystal class: Dipyramidal (mmm); H-M symbol: (2/m 2/m 2/m)
- Space group: Pmmn

Identification
- Formula mass: 441.87 g/mol
- Color: Lead gray to black
- Crystal habit: Massive to crystalline
- Twinning: On {110} very common
- Cleavage: Indistinct on the {001}, {100}, and {010}
- Fracture: Conchoidal
- Tenacity: Brittle
- Mohs scale hardness: 3
- Luster: Metallic
- Streak: Black to chocolate brown
- Density: 5.38 – 5.44 g/cm^{3}
- Optical properties: Anisotropic

Seligmanite is a rare mineral, with the chemical formula PbCuAsS_{3}. Originally described from the Lengenbach Quarry, Valais Canton, Switzerland; it has also been found in the Raura district, Lima Region, Peru; at Tsumeb, Oshikoto Region, Namibia; and at the Sterling Mine, Sussex County, New Jersey, US.
