= Jordanite =

Sulfosalt mineral

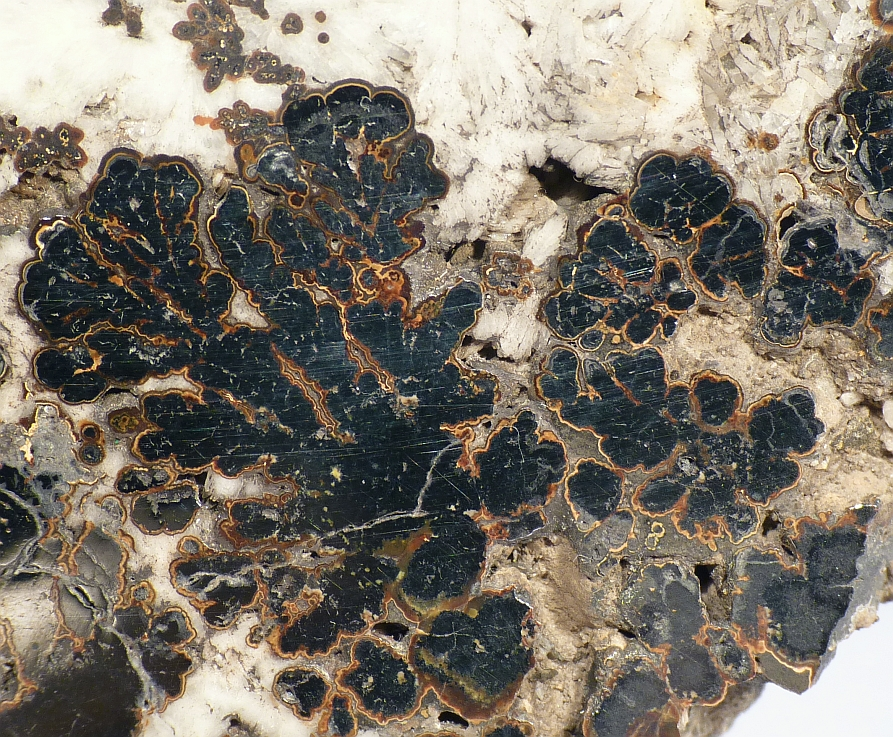

General
- Category: Sulfosalt minerals
- Formula: Pb_{14}(As,Sb)_{6}S_{23}
- IMA symbol: Jrd
- Strunz classification: 2.JB.30a
- Crystal system: Monoclinic
- Crystal class: Prismatic (2/m) (same H-M symbol)
- Space group: P2_{1}/m

Identification
- Colour: Lead-grey
- Cleavage: Perfect
- Fracture: Conchoidal
- Tenacity: Brittle
- Mohs scale hardness: 3
- Lustre: Metallic
- Streak: Black
- Density: 6.4
- Pleochroism: Visible

Jordanite is a sulfosalt mineral with chemical formula Pb_{14}(As,Sb)_{6}S_{23} in the monoclinic crystal system, named after the German scientist Hermann Jordan (1808–1887) who discovered it in 1864.

Lead-grey in colour (frequently displaying an iridescent tarnish), its streak is black and its lustre is metallic. Jordanite has a hardness of 3 on Mohs scale, has a density of approximately 6.4, and a conchoidal fracture.

The type locality is the Lengenbach Quarry in the Binn Valley, Wallis, Switzerland.
