= Aikinite =

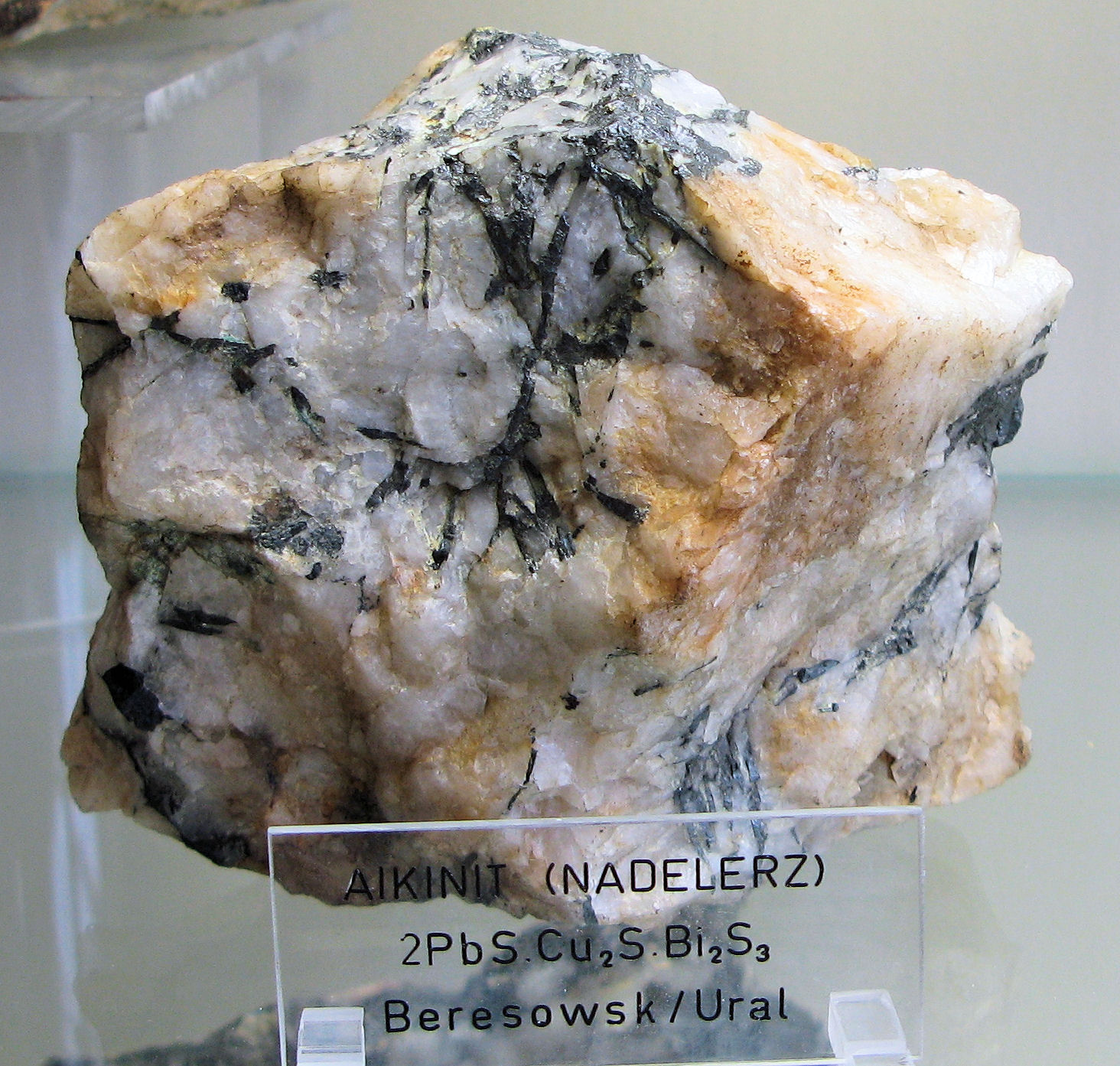

General
- Category: Sulfide mineral
- Formula: Pb Cu Bi S_{3}
- IMA symbol: Aik
- Strunz classification: 2.HB.05a
- Dana classification: 3.4.5.1
- Crystal system: Orthorhombic
- Crystal class: Dipyramidal (mmm); H-M symbol: (2/m 2/m 2/m)
- Space group: Pnma
- Unit cell: a = 11.297, b = 11.654 c = 4.061 [Å], Z = 4

Identification
- Formula mass: 575.92 g/mol
- Color: Lead gray, grayish black, reddish brown
- Crystal habit: Acicular, massive
- Cleavage: {010} indistinct
- Mohs scale hardness: 2–2.5
- Luster: Metallic
- Streak: Grayish black
- Diaphaneity: Opaque
- Specific gravity: 6.1–6.8, Average = 6.44
- Other characteristics: Not radioactive

Aikinite is a sulfide mineral of lead, copper and bismuth with formula Pb Cu Bi S_{3}. It forms black to grey or reddish brown acicular orthorhombic crystals with a Mohs hardness of 2 to 2.5 and a specific gravity of 6.1 to 6.8. It was originally found in 1843 in the Beryozovskoye deposit, Ural Mountains. It is named after Arthur Aikin (1773–1854), an English geologist.

It has been found in Western Tasmania, in mines located near Dundas, Tasmania.
