= Zinkenite =

Sulfosalt mineral

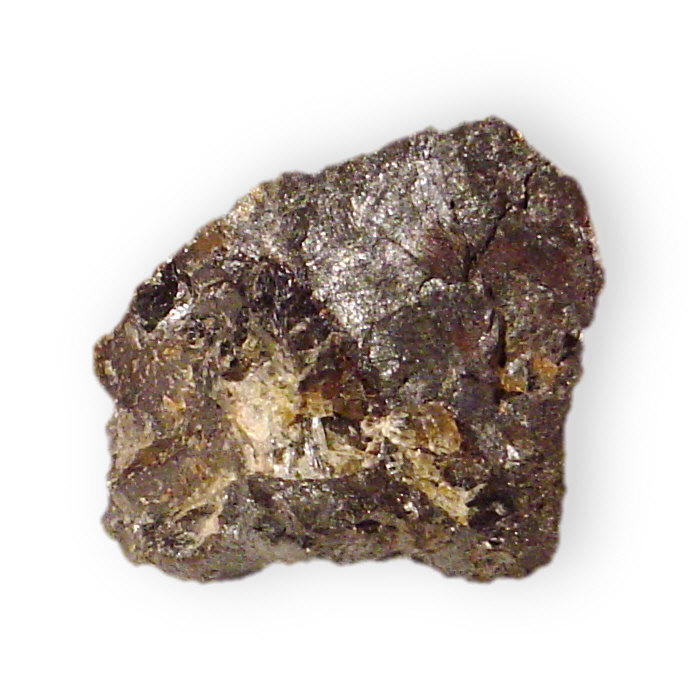
- Zinkenite, Fargo mine, Stevens County, Washington

General
- Category: Sulfosalt minerals
- Formula: Pb_{9}Sb_{22}S_{42}
- IMA symbol: Zkn
- Strunz classification: 2.JB.35a
- Crystal system: Hexagonal
- Crystal class: Pyramidal (6); H-M symbol: (6)
- Space group: P6_{3}

Zinkenite is a steel-gray metallic sulfosalt mineral composed of lead antimony sulfide Pb_{9}Sb_{22}S_{42}. Zinkenite occurs as acicular needle-like crystals.

It was first described in 1826 for an occurrence in the Harz Mountains, Saxony-Anhalt, Germany and named after its discoverer, German mineralogist and mining geologist, Johann Karl Ludwig Zinken (1790–1862).
