= Lengenbach Quarry =

Quarry in the Binn Valley in Valais, Switzerland

Coordinates: 46°22′00″N 8°11′30″E

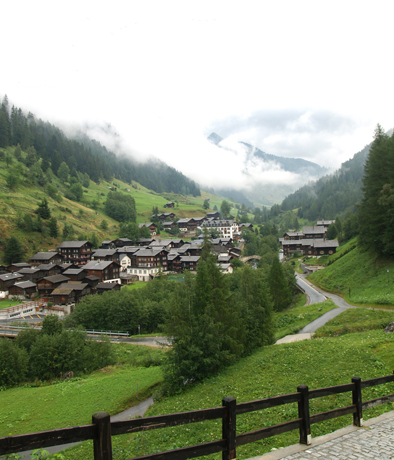
The small village of Binn and its valley.

The Lengenbach Quarry is located in the Binn Valley (Valais, Switzerland) and it is noted among the mineralogical community for its unusual sulfosalt mineral specimens.

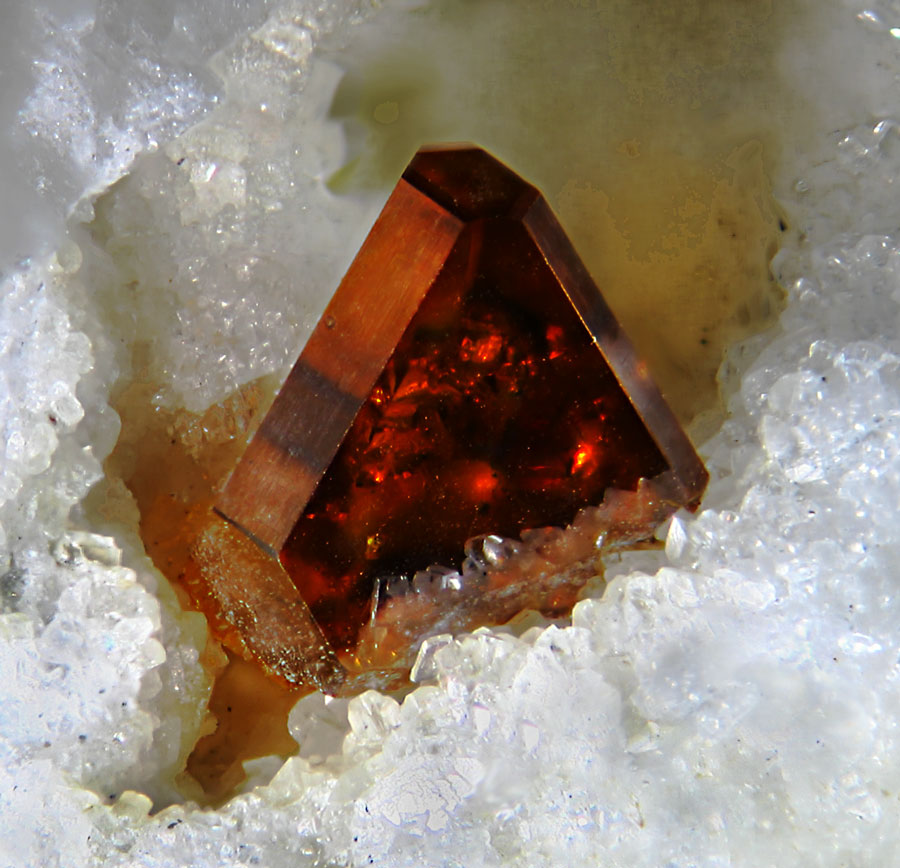
Sphalerite crystal on dolomite, Lengenbach

The dolomite hosted deposit of the quarry is in the Binn Valley, a small valley in the southwest of Switzerland in the Swiss canton of Valais. To its south lies Italy.

== Mineralogy ==
The mineralogy has been studied for nearly 200 years. Lengenbach is the type locality for 48 minerals.
