= Sunart =

Rural district and community in Highland, Scotland

Coordinates: 56°41′43″N 5°34′07″W

Sunart (/ˈsuːnɑːrt/ SOO-nart, Scottish Gaelic: Suaineart [ˈs̪uəɲərˠʃt̪]) is a rural district and community in the south west of Lochaber in Highland, Scotland, on the shores of Loch Sunart, and part of the civil parish of Ardnamurchan. The main village is Strontian, at the head of the loch, which is the location of Ardnamurchan High School, the local fire station, police station and other facilities.

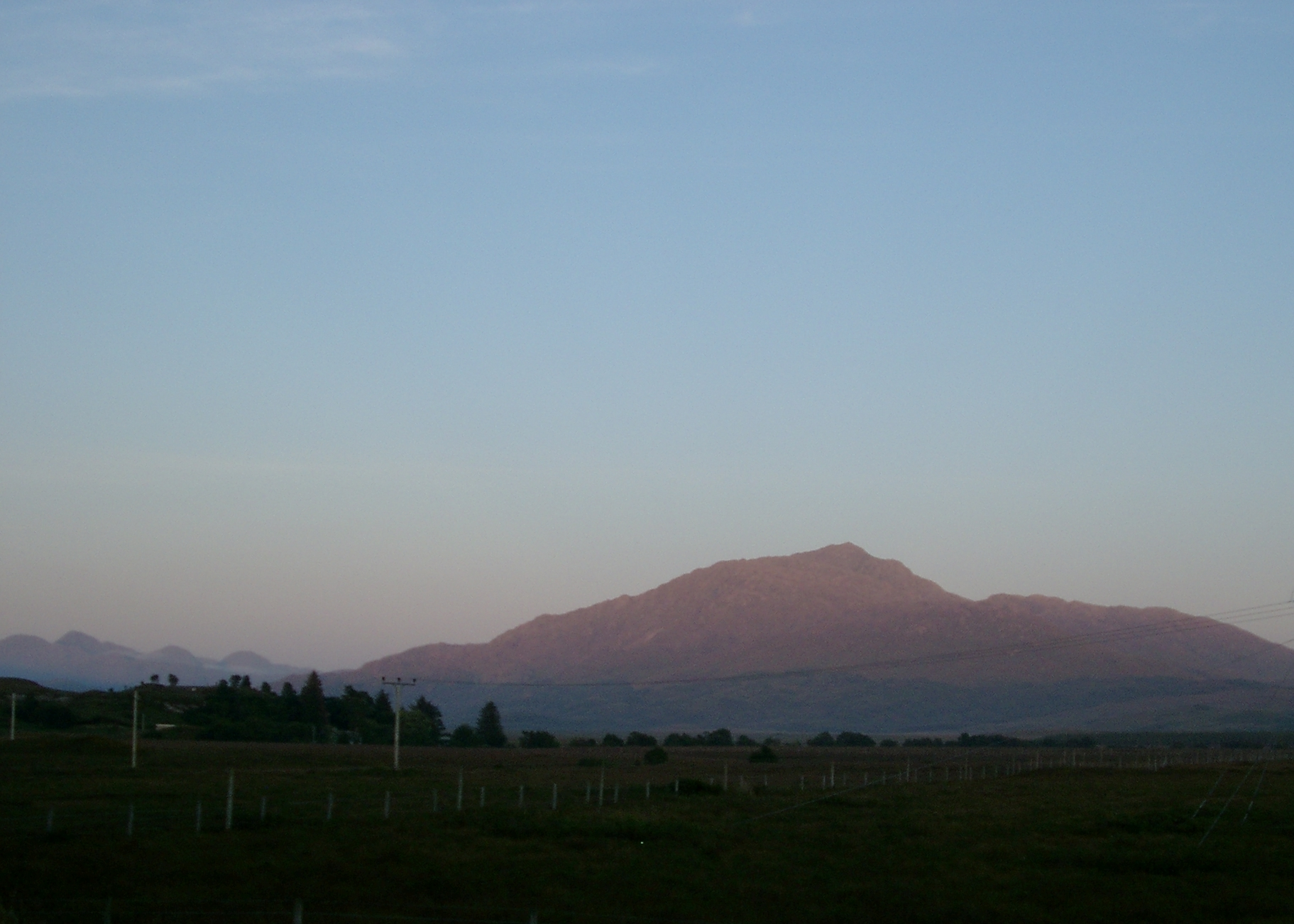
Beinn Resipol at sunset

The district is bounded to the south by the eastern half of Loch Sunart and by part of Morvern, to the west by the Ardnamurchan peninsula (beyond Salen), to the north by Loch Shiel, and to the east and north east by the district of Ardgour, from which it is divided by a range of high hills. Main access to the area today is via Glen Tarbert, from the Corran Ferry, although there is also a road coming in from Lochailort, via Moidart, to the north. Although the area may seem isolated now, in the past the main mode of transport in the West Highlands was boat, and the district was well-integrated into the west coast economy and culture.

Nearly all of the population live in a narrow ribbon of small settlements along the northern shore of Loch Sunart, with a southerly aspect. The inland, including the shore of Loch Shiel, consists of rough, hilly country, mainly moorland, peat bog and woodland, dominated by the main hill, Beinn Resipol, which is a Corbett.

The main income for the area is tourism, with some salmon fish-farming.

== Wildlife ==
The area is renowned for the richness of its wildlife, and it contains some of the best surviving remnants of the ancient temperate Atlantic oak forest which once clothed most of the west coast of Scotland, Wales, Cornwall and Brittany, but now survives only in isolated pockets. Loch Sunart itself also has a rich flora and fauna. In the past salmon and sea trout angling was important to the local hotels, but, like much of Europe, the runs of fish in the spring and summer are much reduced.

The area is reputed to have the widest variety of mosses, ferns, fungi, lichen, the rare chequered skipper butterfly, and bryophyte species in the whole of Europe, due to the mild, wet oceanic climate.

Sunart is designated as a Special Area of Conservation.

A campaign is underway to remove Rhododendron ponticum, an invasive introduced species.

== Places in Sunart ==
- Achnanellan, Anaheilt, Ard Airigh, Ardery, Ardnastaing, Ariundle
- Drumnatorran
- Glenhurich, Gorstanvorran
- Polloch
- Resipole
- Salen, Scamodale, Scotstown, Strontian

== See also ==
- Ariundle Oakwood National Nature Reserve
- Claish Moss
- Strontianite
- Strontium
- Sessile oak
