= Lippmann diagram =

Tool to rationalize the equilibrium state of a solid solution

A Lippmann diagram is a graphical plot showing the solidus/solutus equilibrium states for a given binary solid solution (e.g., (Ba_{1-x}Sr_{x})SO_{4}, barite/celestite) in equilibrium with an aqueous solution containing the two substituting ions: Ba^{2+} and Sr^{2+} (solid solution – aqueous solution system, or SS-AS). It was proposed in the 1970s by F. Lippmann to determine excess Gibbs functions. This diagram summarizes the thermodynamic basis of solid-solution aqueous-solution systems (SS-AS) equilibria and helps to predict the nucleation kinetics for solid solutions crystallizing from an aqueous solution.

In the diagram, the abscissa (horizontal axis) represents two variables with different scales to represent both the solid phase mole fraction and the aqueous activity fraction. The ordinate (vertical axis) represents the solid phase.

There are two variants of Lippmann diagrams:

- Ion-activity Lippmann diagram
- Total-scale Lippmann diagram
