= Strontian =

Main village in Sunart, an area in western Lochaber, Highland, Scotland

Coordinates: 56.696°N 5.569°W

Strontian: Scottish Gaelic: Sròn an t-Sìthein
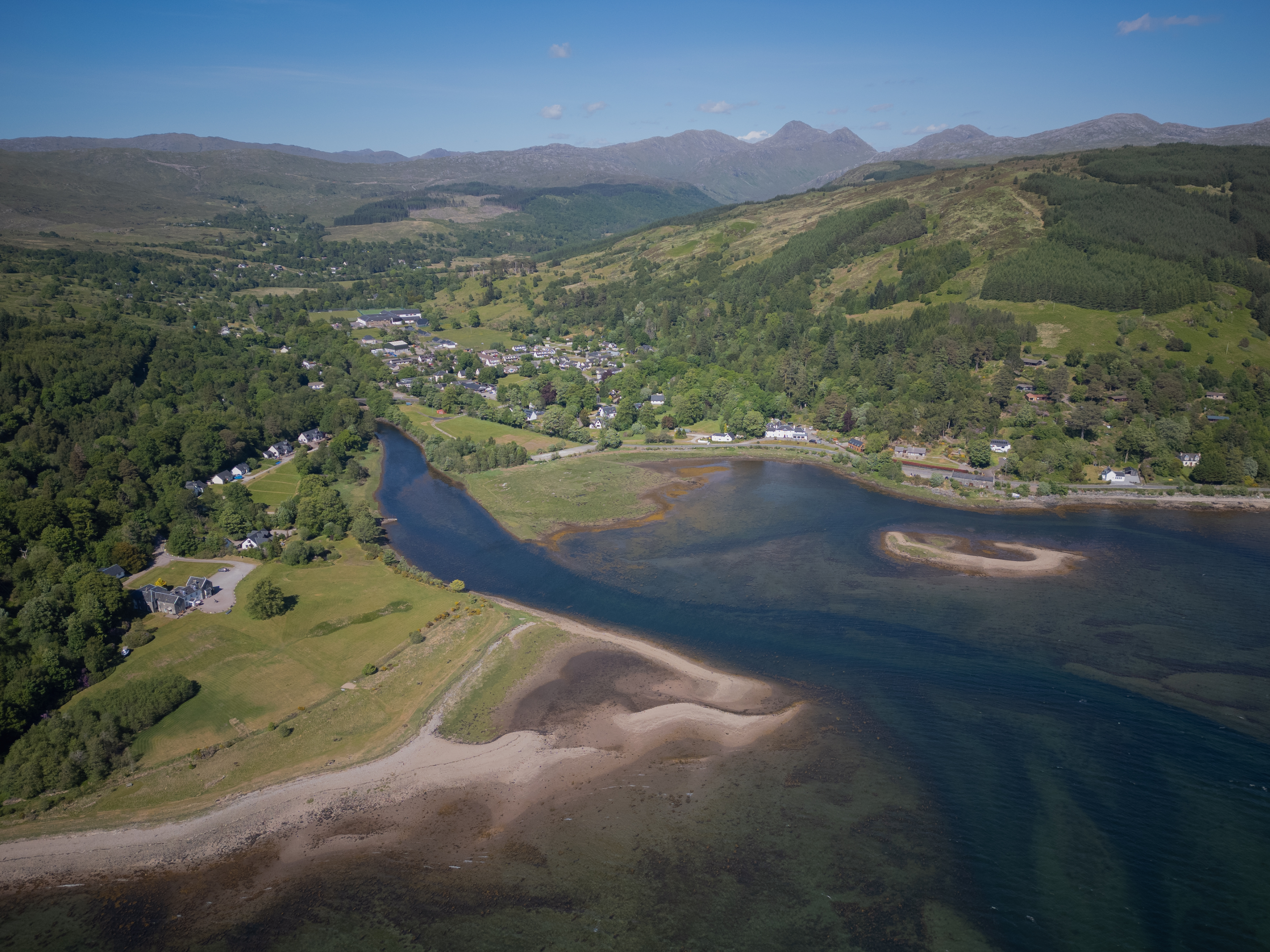
- An aerial view of Strontian

- Location within the Highland council area
- OS grid reference: NM8161
- Council area: Highland
- Country: Scotland
- Sovereign state: United Kingdom
- Post town: Acharacle
- Postcode district: PH36 4
- Dialling code: 01967
- Police: Scotland
- Fire: Scottish
- Ambulance: Scottish
- UK Parliament: Argyll, Bute and South Lochaber
- Scottish Parliament: Skye, Lochaber and Badenoch

Strontian (/strɒnˈtiːən/; Scottish Gaelic: Sròn an t-Sìthein [s̪ɾɔːn̪ˠ ən̪ˠ ˈtʲiː.ɪn]) is the main village in Sunart, an area in western Lochaber, Highland, Scotland, on the A861 road. Prior to 1975 it was part of Argyllshire. It lies on the north shore of Loch Sunart, close to the head of the loch. In the hills to the north of Strontian lead was mined in the 18th century and in these mines the mineral strontianite was discovered, from which the element strontium was first isolated.

The village name in Gaelic, Sròn an t-Sìthein, translates as the nose [i.e. 'point'] of the fairy hill, meaning a knoll or low round hill inhabited by the mythological sídhe. The nearby hamlets of Anaheilt, Bellsgrove, and Upper and Lower Scotstown are now generally considered part of Strontian, with Polloch several miles away on the terminus of the road to Loch Shiel. Strontian is the location of Ardnamurchan High School, the local fire station, police station and other facilities.

== Geology and mining history ==
It was observed in the 19th century that there is granite on one side of the Strontian mines and gneiss on the other. The area immediately around the village is granodiorite, part of a larger intrusion of around 90 square kilometres (35 square miles) that extends south as far as Loch Linnhe. This is surrounded by a hornblende biotite granite, giving way in the south to a tonalite. The rocks are around 385 to 453 million years old, intruded into the metasediments of the Moine Supergroup. It has been postulated that it was emplaced in the shear zone termination of an offshoot of the Great Glen fault and that it may be diapiric in form.

The history of mining in the Strontian area dates to 1722, when Sir Alexander Murray discovered galena in the hills the region. A mine was opened in 1725, in partnership with Thomas Howard, 8th Duke of Norfolk and General Wade. Various materials have been mined here including lead, and strontianite, which contains the element named after the village, strontium. While there have been inhabitants of the area for centuries, particularly in the woods north of the current village, the community as it exists now was established in 1724 to provide homes for the local mining workers.

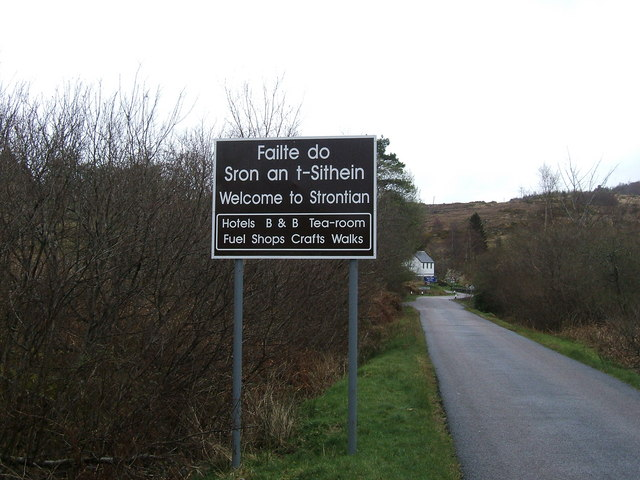
Welcome sign at Strontian

Lead mined at Strontian was used in bullets manufactured for the Napoleonic Wars. In the early part of the 19th century, part of the workforce was made up of captured forces from Napoleon's imperial army.

=== Discovery of strontium ===
In 1790, Adair Crawford, a doctor, recognised that the Strontian ores exhibited different properties to those normally seen with other "heavy spars" sources. He concluded "... it is probable indeed, that the Scottish mineral is a new species of earth which has not hitherto been sufficiently examined". The new mineral was named strontites in 1793 by Thomas Charles Hope, a professor of chemistry at the University of Glasgow. He confirmed the earlier work of Crawford and recounted: "... Considering it a peculiar earth I thought it necessary to give it an name. I have called it Strontites, from the place it was found; a mode of derivation in my opinion, fully as proper as any quality it may possess, which is the present fashion". The element was eventually isolated by Sir Humphry Davy in 1808 by the electrolysis of a mixture containing strontium chloride and mercuric oxide, and announced by him in a lecture to the Royal Society on 30 June 1808. In keeping with the naming of the other alkaline earths, he changed the name to strontium. While several elements have been discovered there, strontium is the only element named after a place in the United Kingdom.

The first large-scale application of strontium was in the production of sugar from sugar beet. Although a crystallisation process using strontium hydroxide was patented by Augustin-Pierre Dubrunfaut in 1849 the large-scale introduction came with the improvement of the process in the early 1870s. The German sugar industry used the process well into the 20th century. Prior to World War I the beet sugar industry used 100,000 to 150,000 tons of strontium hydroxide for this process per year.

=== Conditions for workers ===
In 1851, a miner named Duncan Cameron was killed by a rock-fall in the lead mine. A lengthy inquest followed for the office of the Procurator Fiscal of Tobermory. A number of witnesses to the accident testified that the workings were unsafe and that precautions for the workmen were insufficient. A case was brought against James Floyd, superintendent of the mines, for the culpable homicide of Duncan Cameron.

A number of complaints had previously been made to Sir James Riddell, local landowner and proprietor of the mines. One piece of evidence presented to the inquest notes:

This insufficiency arises from the want of proper props in the workings & in the removal by Mr Barrat of the Middlings or partitions left by the former Company for supporting the workings - a feeling of this nature given expression to by almost all the workmen has existed for the last three years and a number of men left the work altogether in consequence, as they said, of the insecurity of the Mines – I knew this myself but I had either to submit to work there or starve – Necessity with me had no law – The other mines in which I had wrought are worked in a different, safer, principle & more attention paid to the security of the lives of the workmen.

It was noted elsewhere that because the miners were paid for piece-work, no one was able or employed to undertake safety procedures in the mines.

In 1854, miners attempted to bring a case against the mining company, with many of those who presented evidence at the 1851 inquest involved in the action. The legal action failed and was ruled out of order by the sheriff substitute, with 4 pounds 15 shillings in court costs.

== Ariundle Oakwood National Nature Reserve ==
Ariundle Oakwood is a National Nature Reserve and surviving fragment of the native oak woods that once spread along the Atlantic coast from Spain to Norway.

== Religious history of Strontian ==
=== Telford Parliamentary Church (Church of Scotland) ===
The village church was built in the 1820s by Thomas Telford, one of 32 "Parliamentary Churches" he designed for the Highlands and Islands. The government set up a commission in 1823 under John Rickman to build churches in some of the most thinly populated parishes. The project was funded by a grant of £50,000 and meant to include a manse with each church – each church and manse to cost not more than £1,500. Telford decided that it would be most economical to build all the buildings to the same plan. The layout of each church was a simple T-plan. There were two doors and windows in the front wall, which measured 16 m (52 ft 6 in). One gable had a belfry of four plain pillars supporting a pyramidal top. The bell rope came down the outside of the gable. At each side of the building there were two windows. The exterior and interior were undecorated. There was a hexagonal pulpit against the inside front wall.

The church is still in use. The Old Manse, former Church of Scotland Manse, was built to a standard H-plan by Telford in 1827. It is a category C(S) listed building and is today a private residence which also houses the Sunart Archives.

=== Floating Free Church ===
Strontian was the site of reputedly the first moored boat church in the country.

Following the Disruption of 1843 in which the Church of Scotland Free (later the Free Church of Scotland) walked out of the Church of Scotland General Assembly, a congregation of 500 members around Strontian petitioned Sir James Riddell, who then owned the entirety of Ardnamurchan, for land and permission to build a new church. A number of attendants affirmed, in testimony to the Select Committee on Sites for Churches, illnesses contracted by worshippers attending services held outdoors in inclement weather. A letter by Riddell to Graham Speirs, Esq., notes "I find it impossible, conscientiously, to grant sites for churches, manses, and schools, which would imply a sanction on my part, and give a perpetuity on my estates, to a system which I believe to be anti-social and anti-Christian."

With permission refused, subscriptions were taken from the local congregants of £1,400 to have a suitable craft built in Clyde. A floating church was established 150 metres offshore in Loch Sunart in 1846. Eventually a site was obtained in nearby Ardnastang and a Free Church was built there in 1868.

== Village life ==
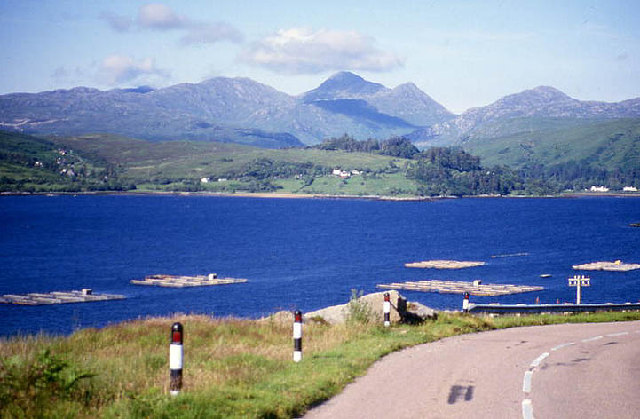
Strontian and Sgùrr Dhòmhnuill viewed from the south shore of Loch Sunart

=== Demographics ===
Strontian is a hamlet with a population of 200 recorded in 1991. This represented a decline from earlier recorded populations of 803 in 1871 and 691 in 1881. The population has since rebounded to a 2013 estimate of ca. 350.

=== 19th century ===
According to John MacCulloch in his descriptive letters to Sir Walter Scott during the 1820s, Strontian is described as "a wild and uninteresting country, though there is some grandeur in one scene, in a deep valley which is terminated by the fine form of Scuir Donald ... Strontian possesses now an excellent inn."

An 1830 source describes it: "The village of Strontian is very pleasantly situated, directly at the head of Loch Sunart, the hills adjoining to which are crowned with beautiful and very thriving plantations. The Loch itself is here extremely picturesque ... [i]n a neighbourhood civilized and populous it would speedily become a favourite retreat."

In the 1830s, residents from Strontian and the surrounding area were among the first to use the "Bounty Scheme" to emigrate to Australia. The Brilliant, a Canadian-built ship, sailed from Tobermory to New South Wales in 1837 with 322 passengers, 105 of whom were from Ardnamurchan and Strontian. The Bounty Scheme, which ran from 1835 to 1841, was proposed by Edward Gibbon Wakefield as a way for Australian settlers to subsidise the emigration of skilled tradespeople from Britain.

In the 1850s more emigrants left from the Strontian and Anaheilt area. The Allison sailed from Liverpool in 1851 for Melbourne with a number of Highlanders from the area aboard.

=== Strontian today ===
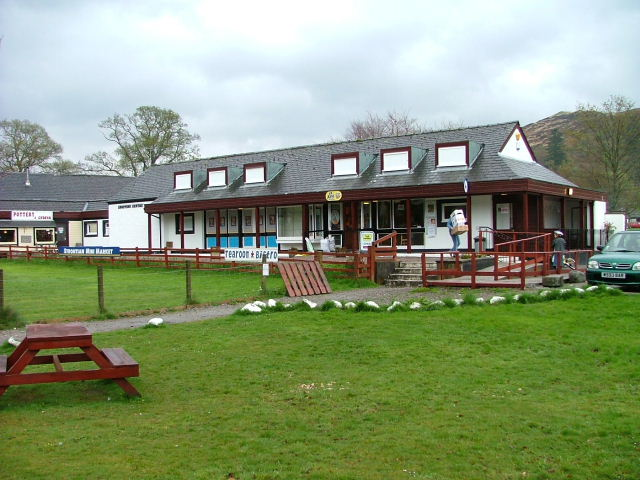
Shopping centre in Strontian

'Strontian House' was built for Sir Alexander Murray of Stanhope in the late 1720s and was named after Colonel Horsy, Governor of the York Buildings Company. Latterly known as the Loch Sunart Hotel, it was still referred to as 'Horsy Hall' and sometimes misspelt 'Horsley Hall'. The hotel was destroyed by fire in 1999. A hotel was later opened in an existing building in the village.

In 1968, Strontian was listed among 2000 "moribund" Highland villages and selected to receive government funding for regeneration. This resulted in the shopping centre, cafe, and information kiosk which are located in the centre of the village.

In 2002 a high school was built in Strontian to serve secondary students of the Ardnamurchan peninsula. Previously local students had to travel to Fort William, Mallaig, or Tobermory for high school, often staying in hostel accommodation and making journeys of up to 4 hours round-trip.

== Other villages ==
Anaheilt (Scottish Gaelic: Àth na h-Èilde, meaning Ford of the Hind) is a village one mile (1.5 kilometres) north of Strontian. The population in 1723 comprised eight families with 8 men, 10 women and 20 children, total 38. In 1806 its area extended to 953.720 acres (385.957 hectares): 42.100 acres (17.037 ha) ploughable land, 56.835 acres (23.000 ha) cultivated with the spade, 9.170 acres (3.711 ha) meadow and 845.615 acres (342.208 ha) moor and pasture. Much of the cultivated and plougable land was turned to 28 crofts by 1828.

Bellsgrove, and Upper and Lower Scotstown are other historic villages, now considered part of Strontian.
