= Saccharate =

Saccharate can refer to either

- a salt or ester of saccharic acid
- or a metallic derivative of a sugar, especially sucrose (thus a sucrate), usually with a bivalent metal (not used systematically)

== See also ==
- Strontian process, involving strontium saccharate
