= Ancylite =

Group of hydrous strontium carbonate minerals

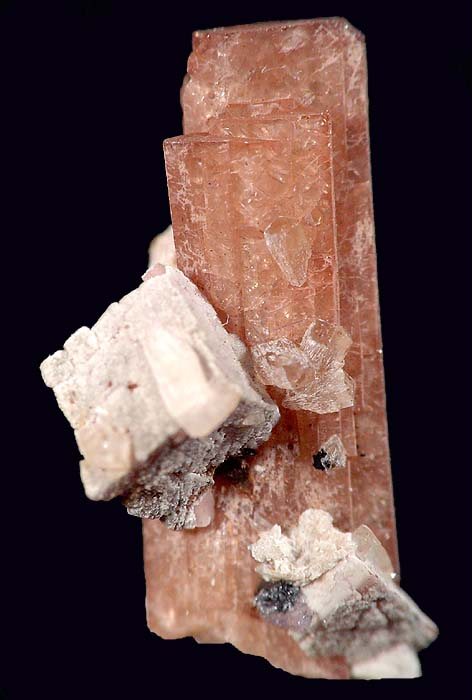
- Nenadkevichite with ancylite crystals on the side

General
- Category: Carbonate mineral
- Formula: Sr(Ce,La)(CO_{3})_{2}(OH)·H_{2}O
- IMA symbol: Anc
- Strunz classification: 5.DC.05
- Dana classification: 16b.1.1.1
- Crystal system: Orthorhombic
- Crystal class: Dipyramidal (mmm); H-M symbol: (2/m 2/m 2/m)
- Space group: Pmcn

Identification
- Color: Light yellow, orange-yellow, yellow-brown, grey
- Cleavage: None
- Fracture: Splintery
- Tenacity: Brittle
- Mohs scale hardness: 4–4.5
- Luster: Dull
- Streak: White
- Diaphaneity: Translucent
- Density: 3.95 g/cm^{3}

Ancylite is a group of hydrous strontium carbonate minerals containing cerium, lanthanum and minor amounts of other rare-earth elements. The chemical formula is Sr(Ce,La)(CO_{3})_{2}(OH)·H_{2}O with ancylite-Ce enriched in cerium and ancylite-La in lanthanum.

Ancylite was first described in 1899 for an occurrence in the Narsarsuk pegmatite in west Greenland and named from the Ancient Greek: ἀγκύλος for curved in reference to its rounded or distorted crystal form.
