= Adair Crawford =

British chemist and physician

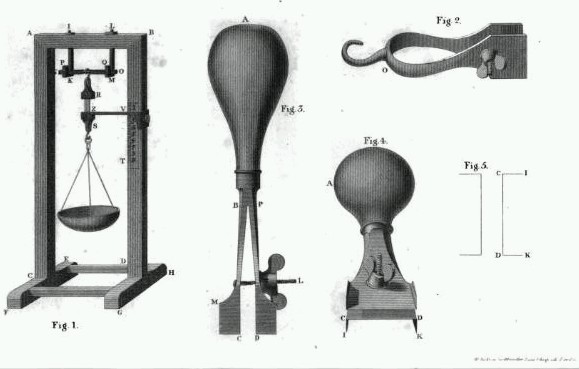
Drawing of some of Adair Crawford's equipment

Adair Crawford FRS FRSE (1748 – 29 July 1795), a chemist and physician, was a pioneer in the development of calorimetric methods for measuring the specific heat capacity of substances and the heat of chemical reactions. In his influential 1779 book "Experiments and Observations on Animal Heat", Crawford presented new experiments proving that respiratory gas exchange in animals is a combustion (two years after Antoine Lavoisier's influential "On combustion in general"). Crawford also was involved in the discovery of the element strontium.

== Life ==
Adair Crawford was born in Crumlin, Belfast, the son of Rev Thomas Crawford. He studied medicine at Glasgow and Edinburgh universities. He qualified MA in 1770 and then worked at St George's Hospital in London before qualifying MD in 1780. He was Professor of Chemistry at the Royal Military Academy, Woolwich, London, and physician at St Thomas' Hospital, London. He died at Lymington in Hampshire.

It is no coincidence that the titles of his publications usually begin with the word experiments. Crawford let the details of his experiments and their plain results do the talking, and generally refrained from theorising and over-interpretation. He did maintain the later-discredited phlogiston hypothesis, but wasn't doctrinaire about it.

In 1785, Crawford was elected a member of the American Philosophical Society in Philadelphia and the following year, in 1786, he was elected a Fellow of the Royal Society of London. In 1787 he was elected a Fellow of the Royal Society of Edinburgh. His proposers were John Playfair, James Hutton, and James Gregory.

He died in Lymington in Hampshire on 29 July 1795.

== Calorimetric work ==
Crawford's book "Experimental Enquiry into the Effects of Tonics and Other Medicinal Substances on the Cohesion of Animal Fibre", written near the end of his life, offers a very readable presentation of his way of doing chemistry. Here's an example:

With a view to determine the changes which animal fibre might undergo by exposing it to the action of Port wine, six portions of the small intestines of a kitten were taken. Three of these were introduced into a phial, which was nearly filled with Port wine, and closed with a cork; and the remaining three were immersed in water, as a standard. Being placed in a cool situation during three days, the portions in contact with the wine were found to have greater firmness than those that were immersed in the water. The sum of the weights required to break the former was 9 lb. 0 oz.; the sum of those required to break the latter was 7 lb. 4 oz. .... With a view to guard against error in trials of this nature, it is of importance that the portions of the intestine should be as nearly as possible of the same length. They should likewise have nearly the same degree of curvature. For a very curved portion of the intestine is more easily broken than a straight one.... If the trials be frequently repeated, results will be obtained that approach near to the truth.... From the foregoing trials, it appears, that the firmness, elasticity, and strength of the intestines of a kitten are considerably increased by immersing them three days in Port wine. I have found, however, that a much less time than this is sufficient for the wine to produce its full effect. In several experiments a manifest increase of cohesion appeared to have taken place in less than an hour; and after ten hours have elapsed, I believe no farther augmentation is produced.

== Discovery of strontium ==
In 1790, along with his colleague William Cruickshank at the Royal Military Academy, Woolwich, London, Crawford noted the distinctiveness of strontianite from barium minerals, and may thereby be said to be the discoverer of strontium. However, it could also be claimed that the honour should go to Humphry Davy who, in 1808, became the first to isolate the pure element.

== Selected writings ==
- Crawford, Adair (1779). Experiments and Observations on Animal Heat, and the Inflammation of Combustible Bodies. London: Murray.(Second edition 1788)
- Crawford, Adair (1790). "Experiments and Observations on the Matter of Cancer, and on the Aerial Fluids Extricated from Animal Substances by Distillation and Putrefaction; Together with Some Remarks on Sulphureous Hepatic Air". Philosophical Transactions of the Royal Society of London. 80: 391–426. doi:10.1098/rstl.1790.0026.
- Crawford, Adair (1816). An Experimental Enquiry into the Effects of Tonics and Other Medicinal Substances on the Cohesion of Animal Fibre. London: G. Hayden.

== Honours ==
- Fellow of the Royal Society (1786)
