= Strontian process =

Obsolete chemical method

The strontian process is an obsolete chemical method to recover sugar from molasses. Its use in Europe peaked in the middle of the 19th century. The name strontian comes from the Scottish village Strontian where the source mineral strontianite (strontium carbonate) was first found.

== Chemistry ==
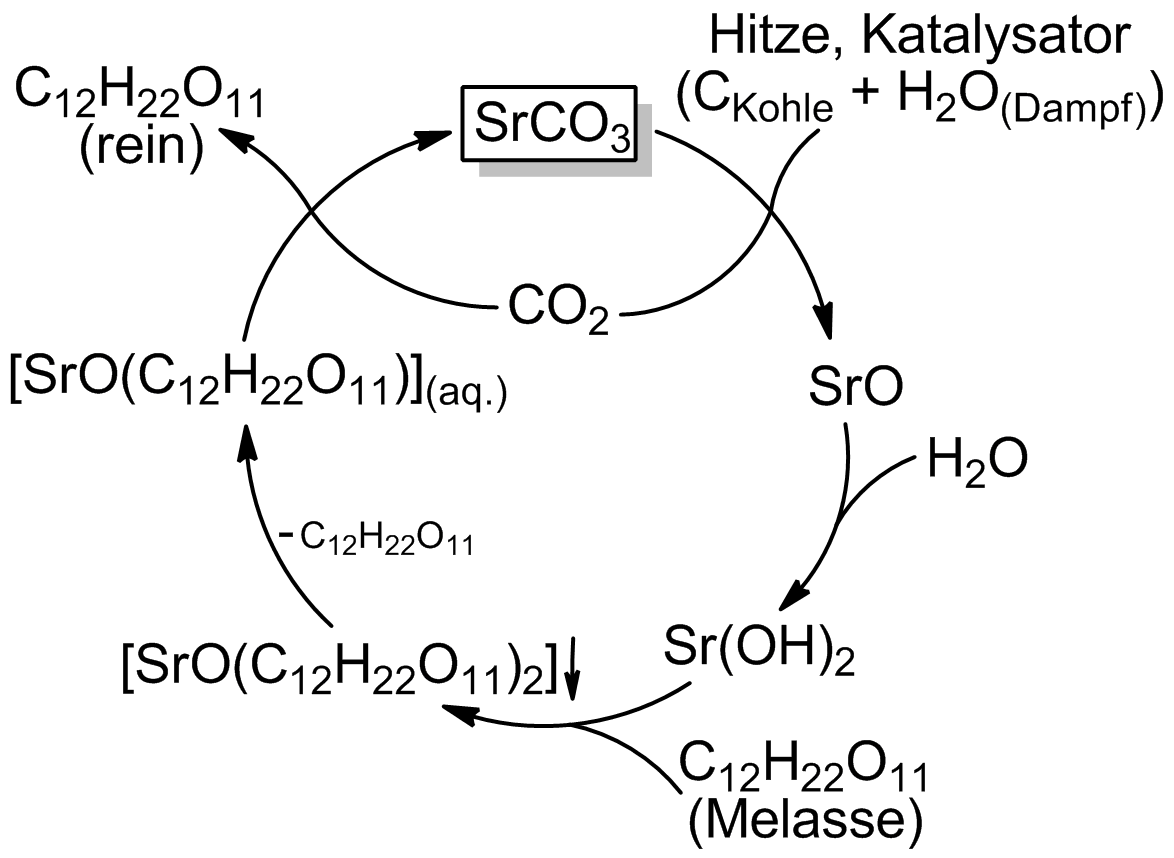
Strontium hydroxide process for sugar beet (in German)

Strontium carbonate is a recycled coreactant in this process.

1. Strontium carbonate is calcined with carbon in the presence of steam to form strontium hydroxide. The strontium and carbon dioxide formed are rejoined later in the process, forming strontium carbonate once again.
  SrCO_{3} + C + H_{2}O + O_{2} → Sr(OH)_{2} + 2 CO_{2}
2. In a molasses solution kept near 100 °C, the hydroxide reacts with soluble sugars to form water and the poorly soluble strontium saccharide which is filtered out, but kept awash in near-boiling water.
  Sr(OH)_{2} + 2C_{12}H_{22}O_{11} → SrO(C_{12}H_{22}O_{11})_{_{2}} + H_{2}O
3. The saccharate liquid is cooled to 10 °C, cracking off one of the sugars
  SrO(C_{12}H_{22}O_{11})_{_{2}} → SrO(C_{12}H_{22}O_{11}) + C_{12}H_{22}O_{11}
4. The carbon dioxide (from the calcination) is bubbled through the saccharate solution, cracking off the second sugar and reforming the strontium carbonate, which is filtered off.
  SrO(C_{12}H_{22}O_{11}) + CO_{2} → SrCO_{3} + C_{12}H_{22}O_{11}
5. The sugar is then extracted by evaporating the remaining solution.

There are two types of strontium saccharide: one at low temperature, the strontium monosaccharide; and the second at high temperature, the strontium disaccharide.

== History ==
Molasses is the first stage output of several different sugar production processes, and contains more than 50% sugar. The French chemists Hippolyte Leplay and Augustin-Pierre Dubrunfaut developed a process for extracting sugar from molasses, reacting them with barium oxide, to give the insoluble barium-saccharates. In 1849, they expanded their patent to include strontium salts. Apparently, this patent application had the only purpose to legally secure the so-called baryte process, since the strontian process from Leplay and Dubrunfaut probably wouldn't work as described.

Only later, through the work of Carl Scheibler (patents dated 1881, 1882, and 1883), was it possible to apply the strontian process on an industrial basis. According to Scheibler the procedure must be carried out at boiling temperatures.

== Repercussion in Germany ==
The Scheibler procedure came into use in the Dessauer Sugar Refinery (in Dessau), through Emil Fleischer. In the Münsterland region, its arrival caused a ″gold fever″ breakout, regarding the strontianite mining. One of the biggest mines, at Drensteinfurt, was named after Dr. Reichardt, the director of the Dessauer Sugar Refinery. A further place the strontian process came to be used was the Sugar Factory Rositz (in Rositz).

Yet by 1883, the demand for strontianite had begun to shrink. First, it was replaced by another strontium mineral (celestine), imported from England, which cost less. Second, the prices for sugar decreased so much, that the production from molasses was no longer worthwhile.

== Literature (further reading) ==
- Börnchen, Martin : Strontianit, Exhibition guide from the University Library of the Free University of Berlin, 2005 (PDF; 6,5 MB). In German.
- Heriot, T. H. P.: The Manufacture of Sugar from the Cane and Beet, Green and Company, 1920, pp. 341–342 (archive online).
- Krause, G.: Der Schiedsspruch in Sachen des Scheibler'schen Monostrontiumsaccharat-Patentes, Chemiker Zeitung, nr. 32, 19 April, 1885, (PDF; 4,94 MB). In German.
