= Trough battery =

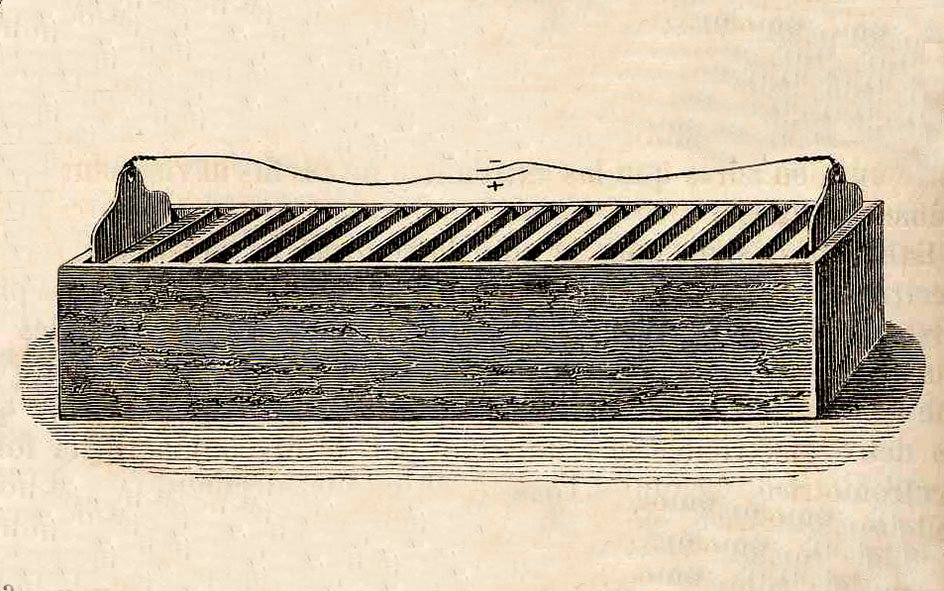
A trough battery

The trough battery was a variant of Alessandro Volta's voltaic pile and was designed by the Scottish professor of chemistry William Cruickshank in 1800.

== Disadvantage of the pile ==
Volta's battery consisted of brine-soaked pieces of cloth sandwiched between zinc and copper discs, piled in a stack. This resulted in electrolyte leakage as the weight of the discs squeezed the electrolyte out of the cloth.

== Advantage of the trough ==
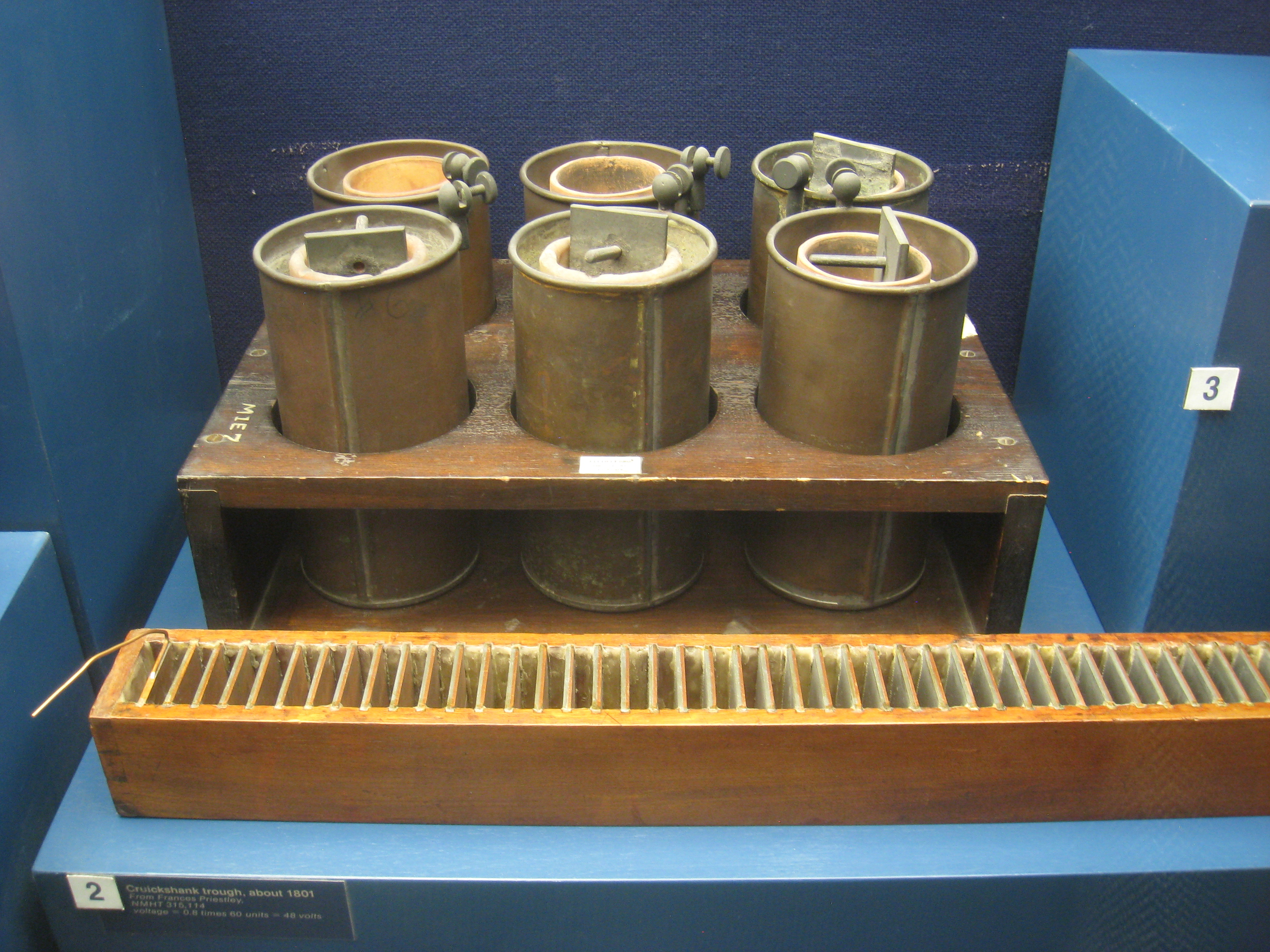
Joseph Priestley's trough battery (in front), with some Daniell cell batteries (behind).

Cruickshank devised a solution to the problem by placing the battery horizontally inside a rectangular box. The interior of the box was coated with shellac to provide insulation, and sets of zinc and copper plates, which were welded together, were arranged evenly within the box. The gaps between the plates, known as troughs, were filled with a diluted sulfuric acid. As long as the box remained undisturbed, there was no danger of the electrolyte spilling.

== See also ==
- List of battery types
