= Friedrich Gabriel Sulzer =

German physician (1749–1830)

- Born: 10 October 1749; Gotha, Saxe-Gotha-Altenburg, Holy Roman Empire
- Died: 14 December 1830 (aged 81); Altenau, Kingdom of Hanover
- Scientific career
- Fields: Medicine

Friedrich Gabriel Sulzer (10 October 1749 – 14 December 1830) was a German medical doctor from Gotha, Thuringia.

Sulzer had a large collection of minerals and published also new results from new species. In 1791, Sulzer published together with Johann Friedrich Blumenbach their results on a new mineral he had acquired. He named the mineral strontianite (strontium carbonate) and made clear that it was distinct from the witherite (barium carbonate) and stated that it contained a new element.

He was head of a veterinary school and a midwifery school and chief physician for the local spa in Ronneburg, Thuringia. Additionally, he was the physician for Dorothea von Medem and her sister Elisa von der Recke. He was part of the Musenhof der Herzogin von Kurland.

In 1774, Sulzer, a companion of Johann Wolfgang von Goethe, devoted a whole academic monography in the domain of social sciences and natural history to hamsters, entitled "An approach to a natural history of the hamster" ("Versuch einer Naturgeschichte des Hamsters"). In several instances, he used the hamster to document the equal rights of all beings, including Homo sapiens.

== See also ==
- List of Germans
- List of physicians
