= Crystal Cave (Ohio) =

Cave in Ohio, United States

Coordinates: 41°38′49″N 82°49′41″W

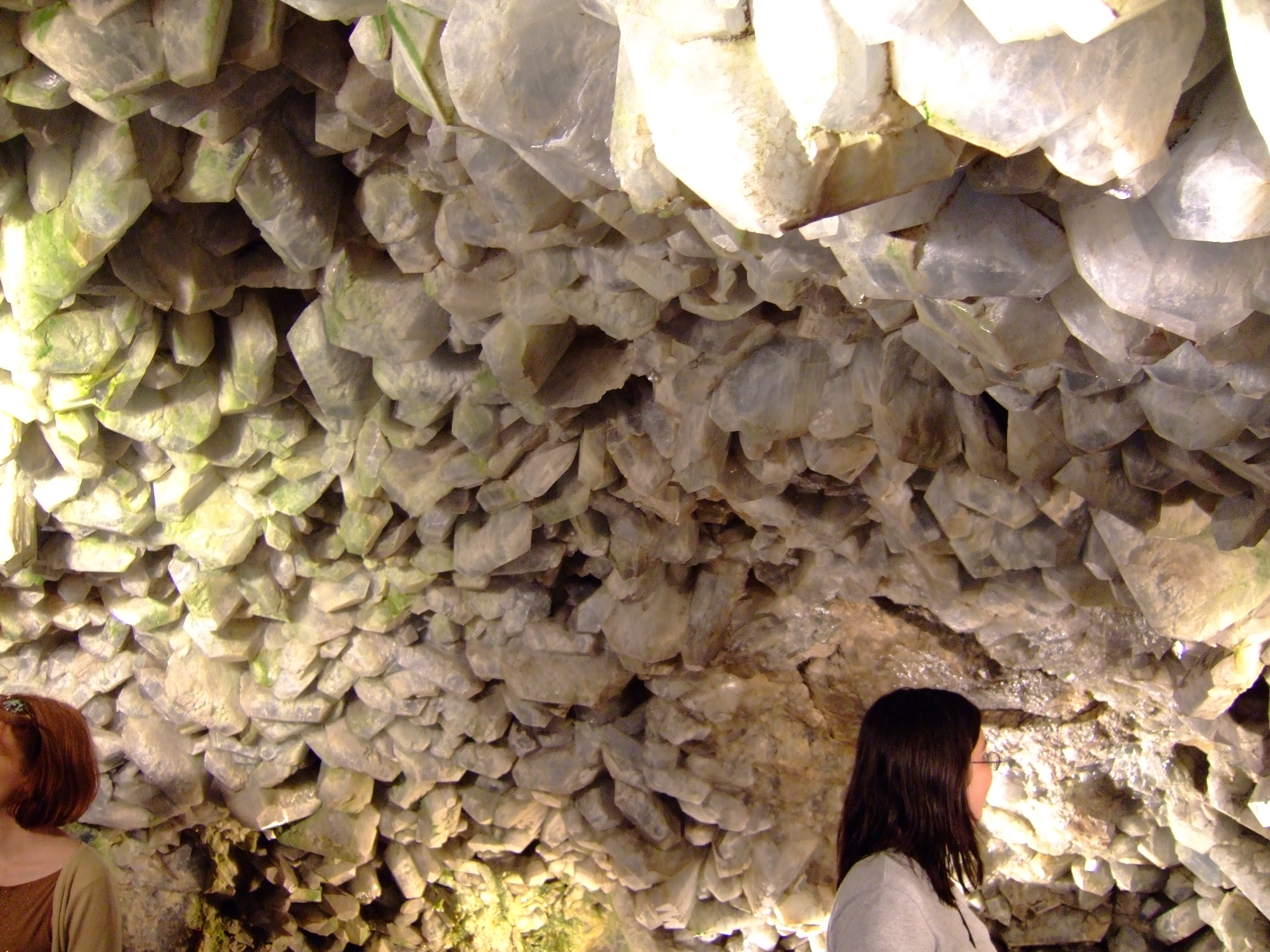
Inside the cave

The Crystal Cave is a limestone cave located in Put-in-Bay, Ohio, located on South Bass Island in Lake Erie.

In 1887, Gustav Heineman emigrated from Baden-Baden, Germany, to Put-in-Bay, Ohio, where he established a winery. In 1897 he dug a well beneath his winery and discovered a large vug at a depth of 30 feet (9.1 m). On exploring the cave he found the cave walls covered with extremely large and well-developed tabular crystals identified as celestine, a form of strontium sulfate.

The original cave was much smaller than it is today, as much of the celestine was mined for the manufacturing of red fireworks, which get their color from the presence of strontium cations as pyrotechnic colorant. However, Mr. Heineman decided to stop the mining and turn the property into a tourist attraction. Due to the Crystal Cave, the Heineman winery survived prohibition because of tourist revenues.

As of 2016, the Crystal Cave is open for tourism, where celestine crystals of up to 3 feet (1 m) in width can be viewed. The crystals form extensive linings on the limestone walls of the 30-foot-deep (9.1 m) deep cave.
