= Ariundle Oakwood =

Forested nature reserve in Highland, Scotland

Ariundle Oakwood National Nature Reserve
- IUCN category IV (habitat/species management area)
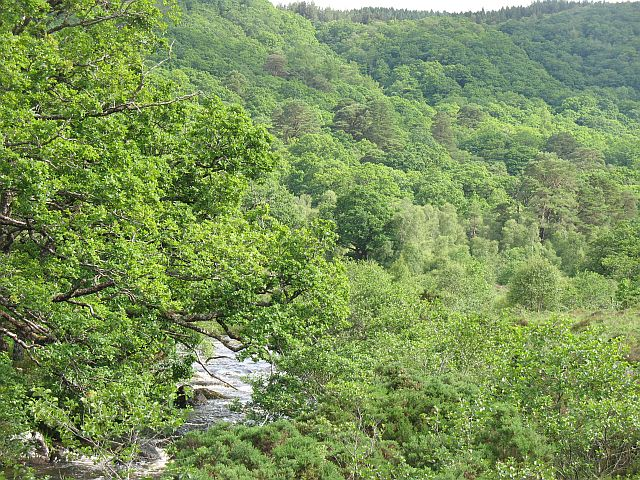
- Ariundle Oakwood

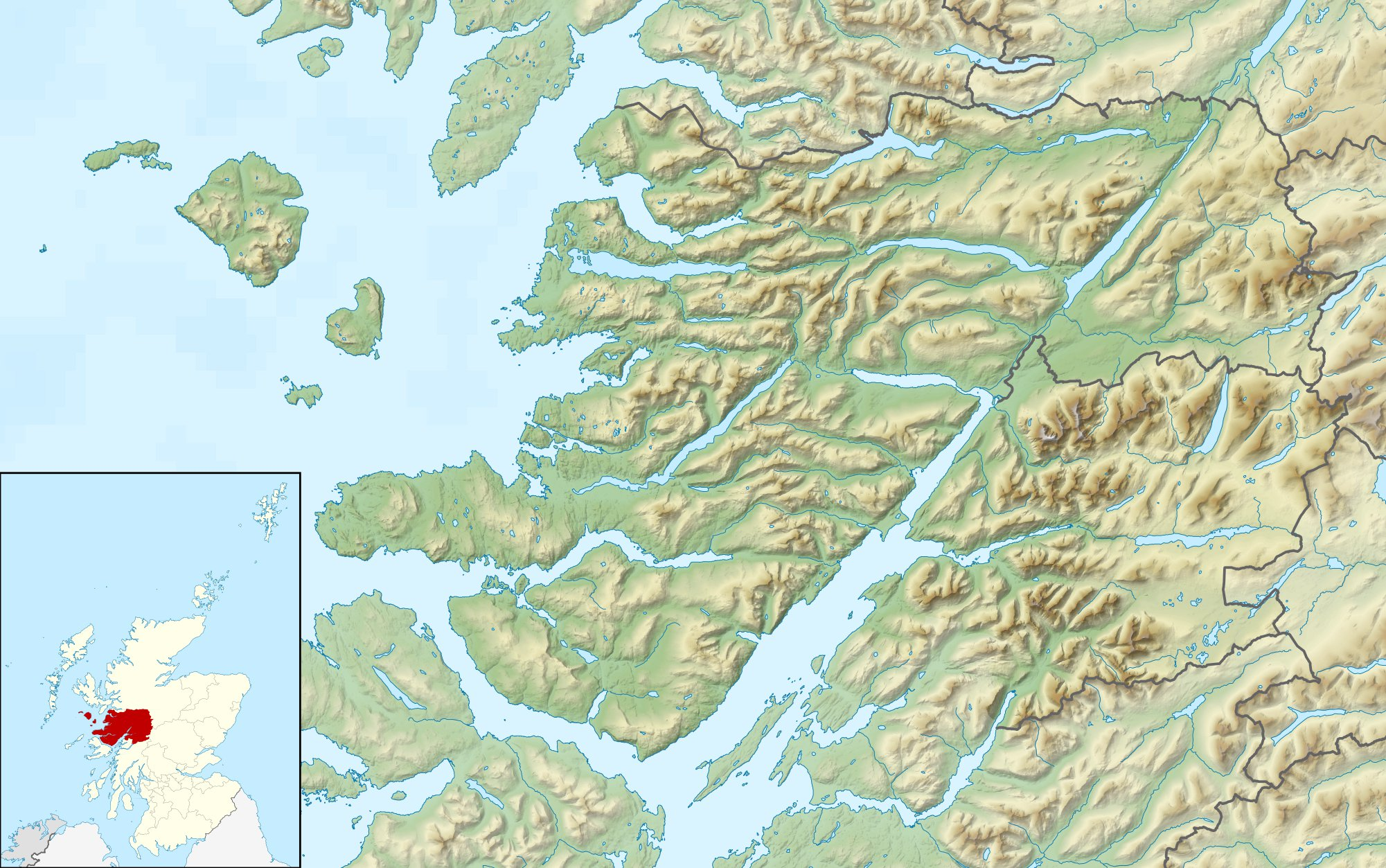
- Location within Lochaber
- Location: Strontian, Lochaber, Scotland
- Coordinates: 56.7164°N 5.5428°W
- Area: 70 ha
- Established: 1977
- Governing body: NatureScot
- Website: Ariundle Oakwood National Nature Reserve

Ariundle Oakwood (Scottish Gaelic: Àirigh Fhionndail, "the shieling of the white meadow") is situated to the north of the village of Strontian in the Sunart area of the Highlands of Scotland. It is located on the western side of the glen of the Strontian River, to the south of former lead mining sites that lie further up this glen. The wood is part of the ancient Sunart Oakwood, and is a remnant of ancient oakwoods that once spanned the Atlantic coasts of Europe from Norway to Portugal. It was designated as a National Nature Reserve in 1977, and is managed primarily by NatureScot, in conjunction with Forestry and Land Scotland, who own the land surrounding the National Nature Reserve. The reserve is classified as a Category IV protected area by the International Union for Conservation of Nature, and also forms part of both a Site of Special Scientific Interest and a Special Area of Conservation.

NatureScot has provided two marked trails in the wood, both of which can be accessed from a car park near the entrance to the reserve. One path takes walkers through the woods on the north side of the reserve, visiting the site of a ruined croft and providing views up the glen to the hills beyond. The other trail visits the lower part of the woods, beside the river Strontian. The two routes can be combined to form a 5 km circular walk. Both marked trails utilise the main track through the nature reserve, which can also be used to visit the lead mines further up the glen, and forms the starting section of the most accessible route to Sgùrr Dhòmhnuill, a Corbett and the 17th highest relative peak in Britain and Ireland.

== History ==
The wood contains remains from earlier settlements in the Strontian area, including charcoal platforms, pony tracks, enclosure dykes, potato lazy beds, and old coppice trees. The people there were described as sluagh an torraidh bhain, or the people of the white hillock, with the settlement recorded as "Torban" in Clan Cameron records. Torban was abandoned to sheep farming in the early 19th century. From 1752, the wood was a source of charcoal for the Bonawe iron furnace on Loch Etive and locally in the lead mining industry. The oak trees were coppiced to ensure a steady of wood for the furnaces, and many of the mature oak trees are multi-stemmed as a result of this practice. Managing the woodland brought about a thousand workers to the area. Lead mining fell off in the early 19th Century and the Bonawe Furnace closed in 1876. After this the woods were no longer needed to supply fuel, but were used as a sheltered area for livestock.

In 1961, Ariundle Wood was designated a Forest Nature Reserve, before its designation as a National Nature Reserve in 1977.

== Flora and Fauna ==
The wood is an example of an Atlantic Oakwood, with sessile oaks, pedunculate oaks, and hybrids of the two forms being the dominant species. The dominance of oak is artificial, and results from the management practices employed during the period when the wood was used for charcoal. Other native species present include holly, hazel, birch, rowan, willow, ash and wych elm. There are also Scots pine within the wood, however it is unclear whether they would normally occur naturally at Ariundle, or have been introduced as a result of the historic management of the forest. Due to this uncertainty, Scottish Natural Heritage's 2009-15 management plan for the reserve aimed to favour broadleaf species when taking action to promote the natural regeneration of woodland. Ariundle is particularly noted for the variety of mosses, liverworts and lichens. Over 270 species of lichen have been recorded, including the nationally rare species Biatora vernalis.

Ariundle hosts a large selection of insect species, including caterpillars, beetles, dragonflies, butterflies, and over 200 species of moths. Of particular note is the chequered skipper butterfly, which is of international importance. Other rare butterfly species found at Ariundle are the pearl-bordered fritillary and the small pearl-bordered fritillary. Migrant bird species found in the wood include red crossbills, common redstarts, wood warblers, tree pipits, and willow warblers. Eurasian otters, pipistrelle bats, Scottish wildcats, pine martens and European badgers are amongst the more significant mammals found in the NNR.
