= Nenadkevichite =

Rare silicate mineral containing niobium

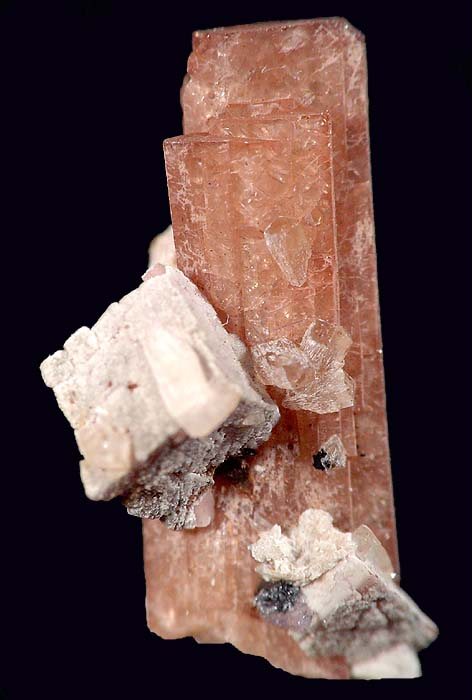
- Nenadkevichite with ancylite crystals on the side

General
- Category: Cyclosilicate
- Formula: (Na,Ca)(Nb,Ti)Si_{2}O_{7}·2H_{2}O
- Strunz classification: 9.CE.30a
- Crystal system: Orthorhombic
- Crystal class: Dipyramidal (mmm); H-M symbol: (2/m 2/m 2/m)
- Space group: Pbam

Identification
- Color: Rose-pink, very light pink, light yellow, brown; dark brown due to inclusions
- Cleavage: Poor/indistinct
- Fracture: Irregular/uneven
- Tenacity: Brittle
- Mohs scale hardness: 5
- Luster: Vitreous, dull
- Streak: White, very light rose-pink
- Diaphaneity: Transparent, translucent, opaque
- Specific gravity: 2.78 – 2.885 g/cm^{3}

Nenadkevichite is a rare silicate mineral containing niobium with the chemical formula (Na,Ca)(Nb,Ti)Si_{2}O_{7}·2H_{2}O. It forms brown to yellow to rose colored orthorhombic dipyramidal crystals with a dull to earthy luster. It has a Mohs hardness of 5 and a specific gravity of 2.86.

It was first reported in 1955 from a nepheline syenite pegmatite in the Kola Peninsula. In addition it has been reported from Mont Saint-Hilaire, Canada; the Ilimaussaq complex, Greenland; Windhoek District, Namibia; and Zheltye Vody, Ukraine. It was named after Konstantin Avtonomovich Nenadkevich (1880–1963), Russian mineralogist and geochemist.
