= Cerite =

Silicate mineral group containing cerium

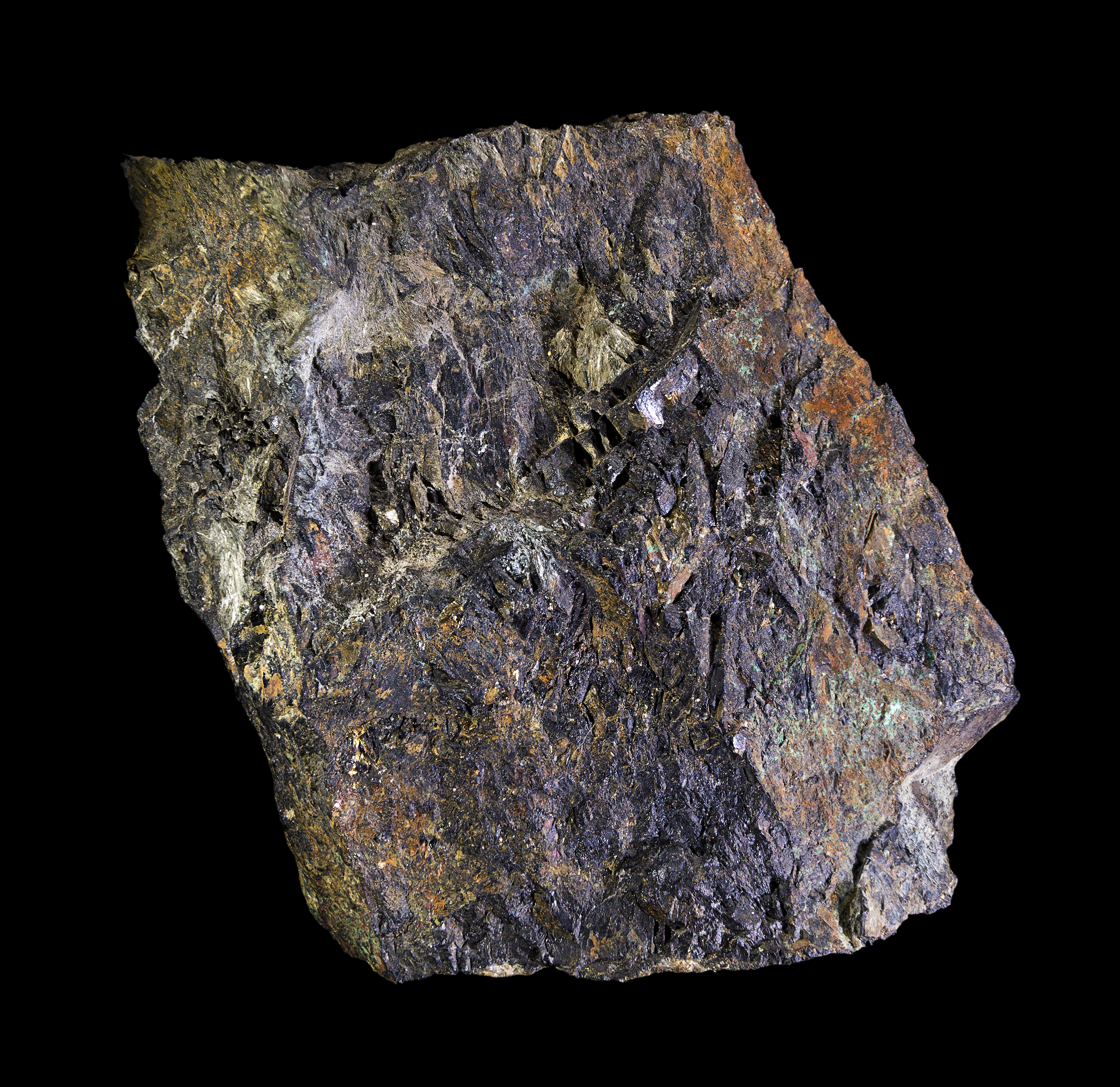
- Cerite – Bastnas – Deposit Topotype

General
- Category: Silicate mineral group
- Formula: (Ce,La,Ca)_{9}(Mg,Fe^{3+})(SiO_{4})_{6}(SiO_{3}OH)(OH)_{3}
- IMA symbol: Crt
- Crystal system: Trigonal
- Crystal class: Ditrigonal pyramidal (3m) (same H-M symbol)
- Space group: R3c

Identification
- Color: Clove-brown with a reddish tinge; pale lavender-brown to colorless in thin fragments
- Crystal habit: Massive granular
- Cleavage: None
- Fracture: Uneven
- Mohs scale hardness: 5 to 5.5
- Luster: Vitreous to resinous
- Streak: White to greyish white
- Diaphaneity: Subtranslucent to opaque
- Specific gravity: 4.7 to 4.86
- Optical properties: Uniaxial (+)
- Refractive index: nω = 1.806 – 1.810 nε = 1.810 – 1.820
- Birefringence: δ = 0.010

Cerite is a complex silicate mineral group containing cerium, formula (Ce,La,Ca)_{9}(Mg,Fe^{3+})(SiO_{4})_{6}(SiO_{3}OH)(OH)_{3}. The cerium and lanthanum content varies with the Ce rich species (cerite-(Ce)) and the La rich species (cerite-(La)). Analysis of a sample from the Mountain Pass carbonatite gave 35.05% Ce_{2}O_{3} and 30.04% La_{2}O_{3}.

Cerite was first described in 1803 for an occurrence in Bastnäs in Västmanland, Sweden. The lanthanum rich species, cerite-(La) was first described for an occurrence in the Khibina massif, Kola Peninsula, Russia in 2002.

== See also ==
- Classification of minerals
- List of minerals
