= Strontianite =

Rare carbonate mineral and raw material for the extraction of strontium

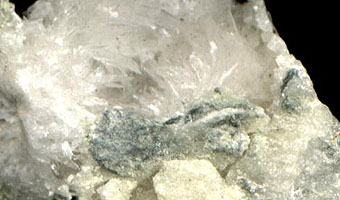
- Strontianite from Slovakia

General
- Category: Carbonate minerals
- Formula: SrCO_{3}
- IMA symbol: Str
- Strunz classification: 5.AB.15 (10 ed); 5/B.04-20 (8 ed)
- Dana classification: 14.01.03.03
- Crystal system: Orthorhombic
- Crystal class: Dipyramidal (mmm); H-M symbol: (2/m 2/m 2/m)
- Space group: Pmcn
- Unit cell: a = 5.1 Å, b = 8.4 Å c = 6.0 Å; Z = 4

Identification
- Formula mass: 147.63 g/mol
- Color: Colourless, white, gray, light yellow, green or brown; colourless in transmitted light
- Crystal habit: Prismatic, acicular, pseudo hexagonal, columnar to fibrous, granular, massive
- Twinning: Very common, usually contact, rarely penetration, also repeated
- Cleavage: {110} nearly perfect, {021} poor, {010} traces
- Fracture: Subconchoidal to uneven
- Tenacity: Brittle
- Mohs scale hardness: 3 1/2
- Lustre: Vitreous, resinous on breaks, greasy
- Streak: White
- Diaphaneity: Transparent to translucent
- Specific gravity: 3.74 to 3.78 Transparent versions are heavier than the other ones
- Optical properties: Biaxial (−)
- Refractive index: n_{α} = 1.52, n_{β} = 1.66, n_{γ} = 1.67
- Birefringence: 0.15
- 2V angle: Measured: 7°, Calculated: 12° to 8°
- Ultraviolet fluorescence: Almost always fluorescent
- Solubility: Soluble in dilute HCl
- Alters to: Celestine SrSO_{4}

Strontianite (SrCO_{3}) is an important raw material for the extraction of strontium. It is a rare carbonate mineral and one of only a few strontium minerals. It is a member of the aragonite group of carbonate minerals together with naturally occurring aragonite (CaCO_{3}), witherite (BaCO_{3}), and cerussite (PbCO_{3}).

The ideal formula of strontianite is SrCO_{3}, with molar mass 147.63 g, but calcium (Ca) can substitute for up to 27% of the strontium (Sr) cations, and barium (Ba) up to 3.3%.

The mineral was named in 1791 for the locality, Strontian, Argyllshire, Scotland, where the element strontium had been discovered the previous year. Although good mineral specimens of strontianite are rare, strontium is a fairly common element, with abundance in the Earth's crust of 370 parts per million by weight, 87 parts per million by moles, much more common than copper with only 60 parts per million by weight, 19 by moles. Strontium is never found free in nature. The principal strontium ores are celestine SrSO_{4} and strontianite SrCO_{3}. The main commercial process for strontium metal production is reduction of strontium oxide with aluminium.

== Unit cell ==
Strontianite is an orthorhombic mineral, belonging to the most symmetrical class in this system, 2/m 2/m 2/m, whose general form is a rhombic dipyramid. The space group is Pmcn. There are four formula units per unit cell (Z = 4) and the unit cell parameters are a = 5.1 Å, b = 8.4 Å, c = 6.0 Å.

== Structure ==
Strontianite is isostructural with aragonite. When the CO_{3} group is combined with large divalent cations with ionic radii greater than 1.0 Å, the radius ratios generally do not permit stable 6-fold coordination. For small cations the structure is rhombohedral, but for large cations it is orthorhombic. This is the aragonite structure type with space group Pmcn. In this structure the CO_{3} groups lie perpendicular to the c axis, in two structural planes, with the CO_{3} triangular groups of one plane pointing in opposite directions to those of the other. These layers are separated by layers of cations.

The CO_{3} group is slightly non-planar; the carbon atom lies 0.007 Å out of the plane of the oxygen atoms. The groups are tilted such that the angle between a plane drawn through the oxygen atoms and a plane parallel to the a-b unit cell plane is 2°40’.

== Crystal form ==
Strontianite occurs in several different habits. Crystals are short prismatic parallel to the c axis and often acicular. Calcium-rich varieties often show steep pyramidal forms. Crystals may be pseudo hexagonal due to equal development of different forms. Prism faces are striated horizontally. The mineral also occurs as columnar to fibrous, granular or rounded masses.

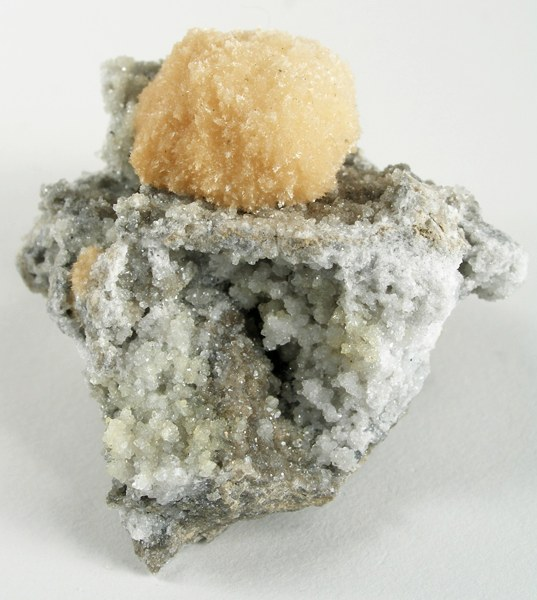
Radial aggregate of strontianite

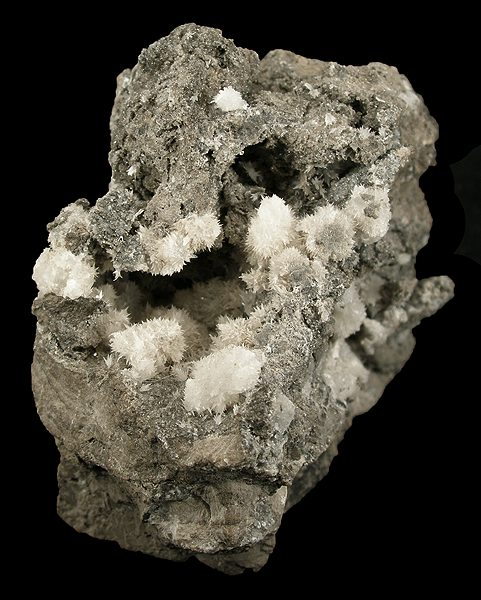
Acicular strontianite in spherical aggregates

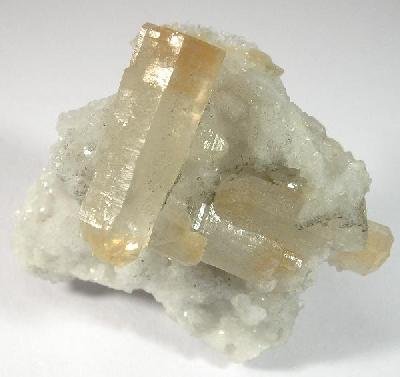
Strontianite in pseudo-hexagonal crystals

== Optical properties ==
Strontianite is colourless, white, gray, light yellow, green or brown, colourless in transmitted light. It may be longitudinally zoned. It is transparent to translucent, with a vitreous (glassy) lustre, resinous on broken surfaces, and a white streak.

It is a biaxial(−) mineral. The direction perpendicular to the plane containing the two optic axes is called the optical direction Y. In strontianite Y is parallel to the b crystal axis. The optical direction Z lies in the plane containing the two optic axes and bisects the acute angle between them. In strontianite Z is parallel to the a crystal axis. The third direction X, perpendicular both to Y and to Z, is parallel to the c crystal axis. The refractive indices are close to n_{α} = 1.52, n_{β} = 1.66, n_{γ} = 1.67, with different sources quoting slightly different values:

- n_{α} = 1.520, n_{β} = 1.667, n_{γ} = 1.669
- n_{α} = 1.516 – 1.520, n_{β} = 1.664 – 1.667, n_{γ} = 1.666 – 1.668
- n_{α} = 1.517, n_{β} = 1.663, n_{γ} = 1.667 (synthetic material)

The maximum birefringence δ is 0.15 and the measured value of 2V is 7°, calculated 12° to 8°.

If the colour of the incident light is changed, then the refractive indices are modified, and the value of 2V changes. This is known as dispersion of the optic axes. For strontianite the effect is weak, with 2V larger for violet light than for red light r < v.

== Luminescence ==
Strontianite is almost always fluorescent. It fluoresces bright yellowish white under shortwave, mediumwave and longwave ultraviolet radiation. If the luminescence persists after the ultraviolet source is switched off the sample is said to be phosphorescent. Most strontianite phosphoresces a strong, medium duration, yellowish white after exposure to all three wavelengths. It is also fluorescent and phosphorescent in X-rays and electron beams. All materials will glow red hot if they are heated to a high enough temperature (provided they do not decompose first); some materials become luminescent at much lower temperatures, and this is known as thermoluminescence. Strontianite is sometimes thermoluminescent.

== Physical properties ==
Cleavage is nearly perfect parallel to one set of prism faces, {110}, and poor on {021}. Traces of cleavage have been observed on {010}.

Twinning is very common, with twin plane {110}. The twins are usually contact twins; in a contact twin the two individuals appear to be reflections of each other in the twin plane. Penetration twins of strontianite are rarer; penetration twins are made up of interpenetrating individuals that are related to each other by rotation about a twin axis. Repeated twins are made up of three or more individuals twinned according to the same law. If all the twin planes are parallel then the twin is polysynthetic, otherwise it is cyclic. In strontianite repeated twinning forms cyclic twins with three or four individuals, or polysynthetic twins.

The mineral is brittle, and breaks with a subconchoidal to uneven fracture. It is quite soft, with a Mohs hardness of 3 1/2, between calcite and fluorite. The specific gravity of the pure endmember with no calcium substituting for strontium is 3.78, but most samples contain some calcium, which is lighter than strontium, giving a lower specific gravity, in the range 3.74 to 3.78. Substitutions of the heavier ions barium and/or lead increase the specific gravity, although such substitutions are never very abundant. Strontianite is soluble in dilute hydrochloric acid HCl and it is not radioactive.

== Environment and associations ==
Strontianite is an uncommon low-temperature hydrothermal mineral formed in veins in limestone, marl, and chalk, and in geodes and concretions. It occurs rarely in hydrothermal metallic veins but is common in carbonatites. It most likely crystallises at or near 100 °C. Its occurrence in open vugs and veins suggests crystallisation at very low pressures, probably at most equal to the hydrostatic pressure of the ground water. Under appropriate conditions it alters to celestine SrSO_{4}, and it is itself found as an alteration from celestine. These two minerals are often found in association, together with baryte, calcite, harmotome and sulfur.

== Occurrences ==
=== Type locality ===
The type locality is Strontian, North West Highlands (Argyllshire), Scotland, UK. The type material occurred in veins in gneiss.

Other UK localities include Brownley Hill Mine (Bloomsberry Horse Level), Nenthead, Alston Moor District, North Pennines, North and Western Region (Cumberland), Cumbria, England, associated with a suite of primary minerals (bournonite, millerite and ullmannite) which are not common in other Mississippi Valley-type deposits.

=== Canada ===
The Francon quarry, Montréal, Québec.
Strontianite is very common at the Francon Quarry, in a great variety of habits. It is a late stage mineral, sometimes found as multiple generations. It is found as translucent to opaque, white to pale yellow or beige generally smooth surfaced spheroids, hemispheres and compact spherical and botryoidal aggregates to 10 cm in diameter, and as spheres consisting of numerous radiating acicular crystals, up to 1 cm across. Also as tufts, parallel bundles, and sheaf-like clusters of fibrous to acicular crystals, and as white, finely granular porcelaneous and waxy globular aggregates. Transparent, pale pink, columnar to tabular sixling twins up to 1 cm in diameter have been found, and aggregates of stacked stellate sixling twins consisting of transparent, pale yellow tabular crystals.

Another Canadian occurrence is at Nepean, Ontario, in vein deposits in limestone.

=== Germany ===
Commercially important deposits occur in marls in Westphalia, and it is also found with zeolites at Oberschaffhausen, Bötzingen, Kaiserstuhl, Baden-Württemberg.

=== India ===
In Trichy (Tiruchirappalli; Tiruchi), Tiruchirapalli District, Tamil Nadu, it occurs with celestine SrSO_{4}, gypsum and phosphate nodules in clay.

=== Mexico ===
It occurs in the Sierra Mojada District, with celestine in a lead-silver deposit.

=== Russia ===
It occurs in the Kirovskii apatite mine, Kukisvumchorr Mt, Khibiny Massif, Kola Peninsula, Murmanskaja Oblast', Northern Region, in late hydrothermal assemblages in cavities in pegmatites, associated with kukharenkoite-(La), microcline, albite, calcite, nenadkevichite, hilairite, catapleiite, donnayite-(Y), synchysite-(Ce), pyrite and others.

It also occurs at Yukspor Mountain, Khibiny Massif, Kola Peninsula, Murmanskaja Oblast', Northern Region, in an aegerine-natrolite-microcline vein in foyaite, associated with aegirine, anatase, ancylite-(Ce), barylite, catapleiite, cerite-(Ce), cerite-(La), chabazite-(Ca), edingtonite, fluorapatite, galena, ilmenite, microcline, natrolite, sphalerite and vanadinite. At the same locality it was found in alkaline pegmatite veins associated with clinobarylite, natrolite, aegirine, microcline, catapleiite, fluorapatite, titanite, fluorite, galena, sphalerite, annite, astrophyllite, lorenzenite, labuntsovite-Mn, kuzmenkoite-Mn, cerite-(Ce), edingtonite, ilmenite and calcite.

=== United States ===
In the Gulf coast of Louisiana and Texas, strontianite occurs with celestine in calcite cap rock of salt domes.

At the Minerva Number 1 Mine (Ozark-Mahoning Number 1 Mine) Ozark-Mahoning Group, Cave-in-Rock, Illinois, in the Kentucky Fluorspar District, Hardin County strontanite occurs as white, brown or rarely pink tufts and bowties of acicular crystals with slightly curved terminations.

In the Silurian Lockport Group, Central and Western New York strontianite is observed in cavities in eastern Lockport, where it occurs as small white radiating sprays of acicular crystals.

In Schoharie County, New York, it occurs in geodes and veins with celestine and calcite in limestone, and in Mifflin County, Pennsylvania, it occurs with aragonite, again in limestone.

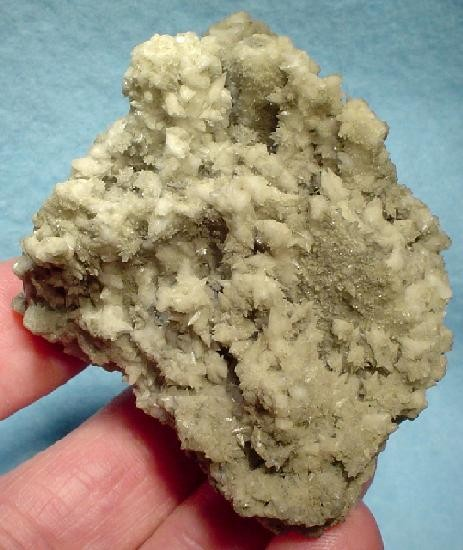
Strontianite from Strontian, Scotland

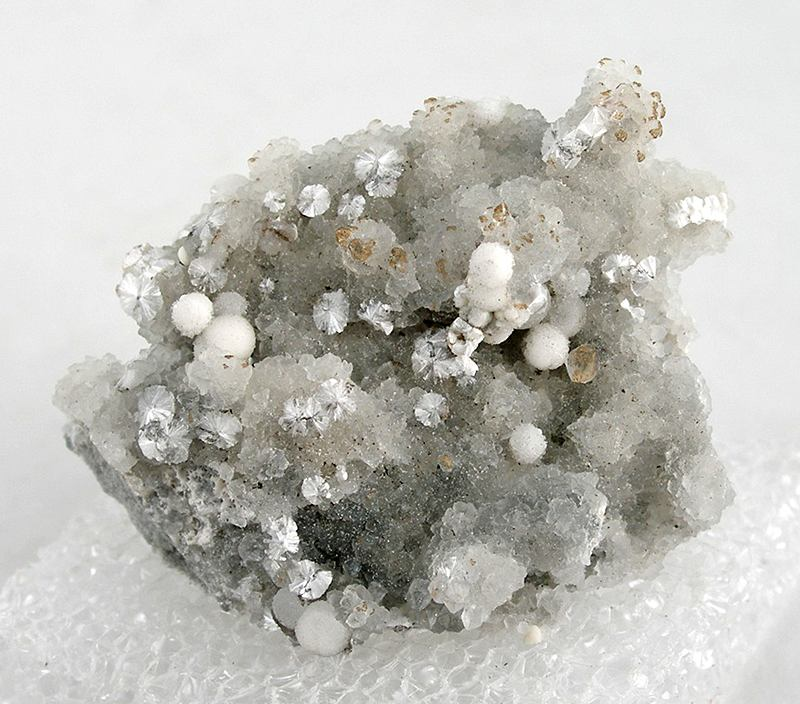
Dresserite and Strontianite from the Francon quarry, Canada

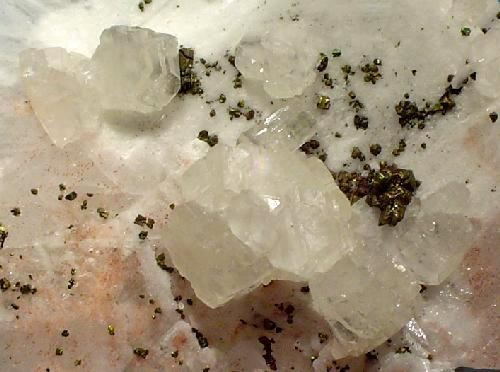
Strontianite from the Dreislar Mine, North Rhine-Westphalia, Germany

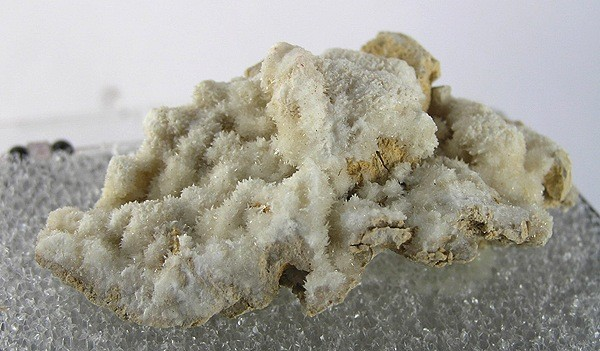
Strontianite from Texas, US

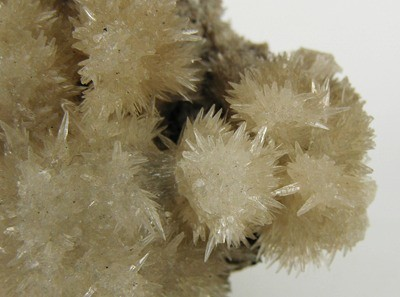
Strontianite from Illinois, US

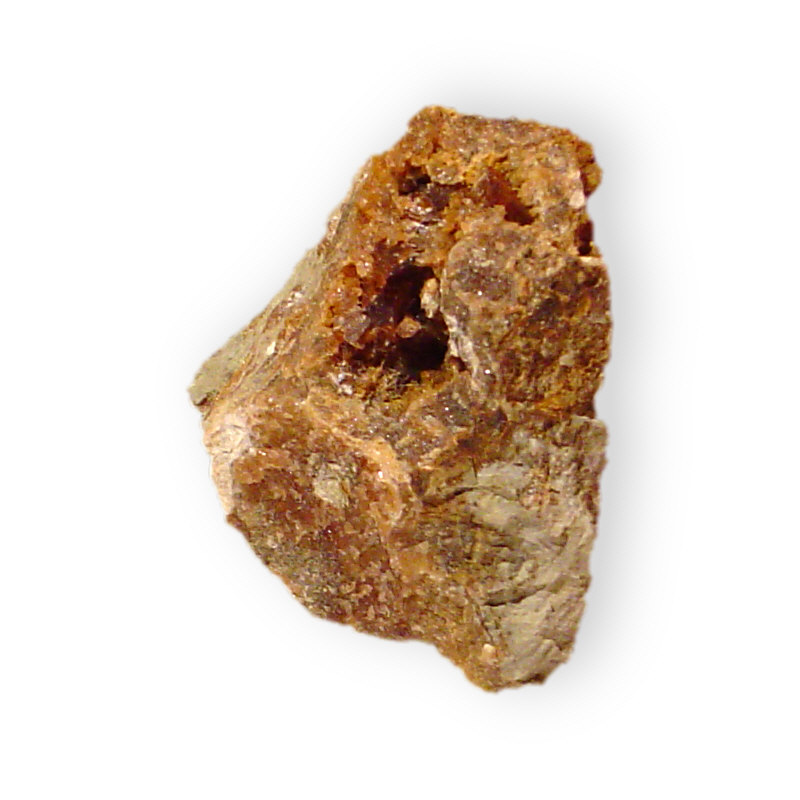
Strontianite from California

== See also ==
- Strontian process
