= Celestine (mineral) =

Sulfate mineral

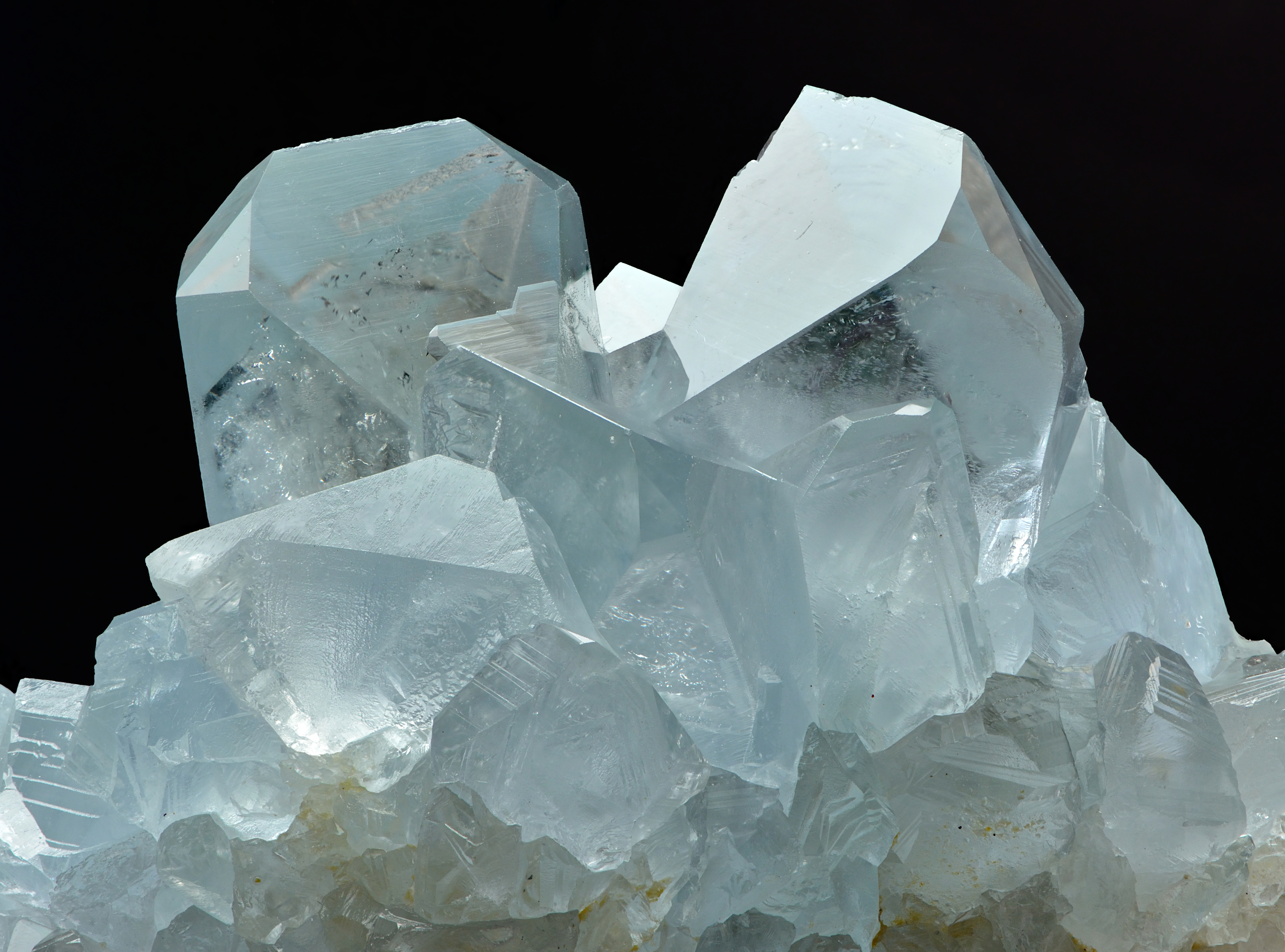
- Clear grey-blue celestine crystals

General
- Category: Sulfate minerals
- Formula: SrSO_{4} sometimes contains minor calcium and/or barium
- IMA symbol: Clt
- Strunz classification: 7.AD.35
- Crystal system: Orthorhombic
- Crystal class: Dipyramidal (mmm); H-M symbol: (2/m 2/m 2/m)
- Space group: Pnma
- Unit cell: a = 8.359 Å, b = 5.352 Å, c = 6.866 Å; Z = 4

Identification
- Color: White, pink, pale green, pale brown, black, pale blue, reddish, greyish; colourless or lightly tinted in transmitted light
- Crystal habit: Tabular to pyramidal crystals, also fibrous, lamellar, earthy, massive granular
- Cleavage: Perfect on {001}, good on {210}, poor on {010}
- Fracture: Uneven
- Tenacity: Brittle
- Mohs scale hardness: 3.0–3.5
- Luster: Vitreous, pearly on cleavages
- Streak: white
- Diaphaneity: Transparent to translucent
- Specific gravity: 3.95–3.97
- Optical properties: Biaxial (+)
- Refractive index: n_{α} = 1.619–1.622 n_{β} = 1.622–1.624 n_{γ} = 1.630–1.632
- Birefringence: δ = 0.011
- Pleochroism: Weak
- 2V angle: Measured: 50°–51°
- Dispersion: Moderate r < v
- Ultraviolet fluorescence: yellow, white blue (both short and long UV)

Celestine (the IMA-accepted name) or celestite (Note: Celestine is the approved name for this mineral by the IMA Commission on New Minerals and Mineral Names (CNMMN). Although celestite finds frequent usage in some mineralogical texts, the name has been discredited as a valid mineral name by that organization.) is a mineral consisting of strontium sulfate (SrSO_{4}). The mineral is named after its occasional delicate blue color. Celestine and the carbonate mineral strontianite are the principal sources of the element strontium, commonly used in fireworks and in various metal alloys.

== Etymology ==
Celestine derives its name from the Latin word caelestis meaning celestial which in turn is derived from the Latin word caelum meaning sky, air, weather, atmosphere and heaven.

== Occurrence ==
Celestine occurs as crystals, and also in compact massive and fibrous forms. It is mostly found in sedimentary rocks, often associated with the minerals gypsum, anhydrite, and halite. On occasion in some localities, it may also be found with sulfur inclusions.

The mineral is found worldwide, usually in small quantities. Pale blue crystal specimens are found in Madagascar. White and orange variants also occurred at Yate, Bristol, UK, where it was extracted for commercial purposes until April 1991.

The skeletons of the protozoan Acantharea are made of celestine, unlike those of other radiolarians which are made of silica.

In carbonate marine sediments, burial dissolution is a recognized mechanism of celestine precipitation. It is sometimes used as a gemstone.

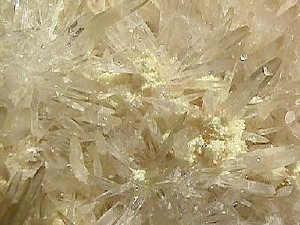
Celestine from the Machow Mine, Poland

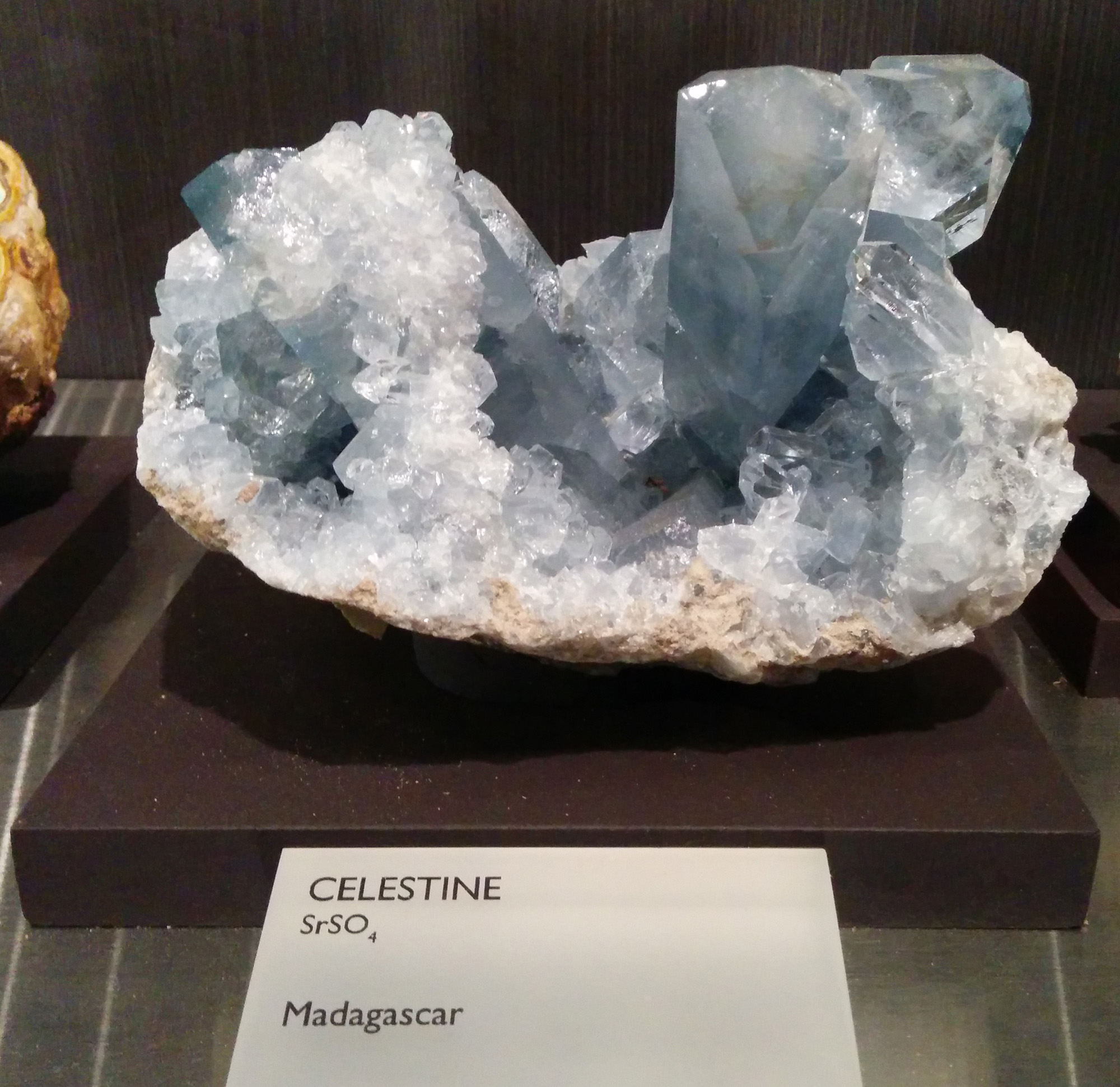
Celestine mineral on display at Yale's Peabody Museum

== Geodes ==
Celestine crystals are found in some geodes. The world's largest known geode, a celestine geode 35 feet (11 m) in diameter at its widest point, is located near the village of Put-in-Bay, Ohio, on South Bass Island in Lake Erie. The geode has been converted into a viewing cave, Crystal Cave, with the crystals which once composed the floor of the geode removed. The geode has celestine crystals as wide as 18 inches (46 cm) across, estimated to weigh up to 300 pounds (140 kg) each.

Celestine geodes are understood to form by replacement of alabaster nodules consisting of the calcium sulfates gypsum or anhydrite. Calcium sulfate is sparingly soluble, but strontium sulfate is mostly insoluble. Strontium-bearing solutions that come into contact with calcium sulfate nodules dissolve the calcium away, leaving a cavity. The strontium is immediately precipitated as celestine, with the crystals growing into the newly formed cavity.

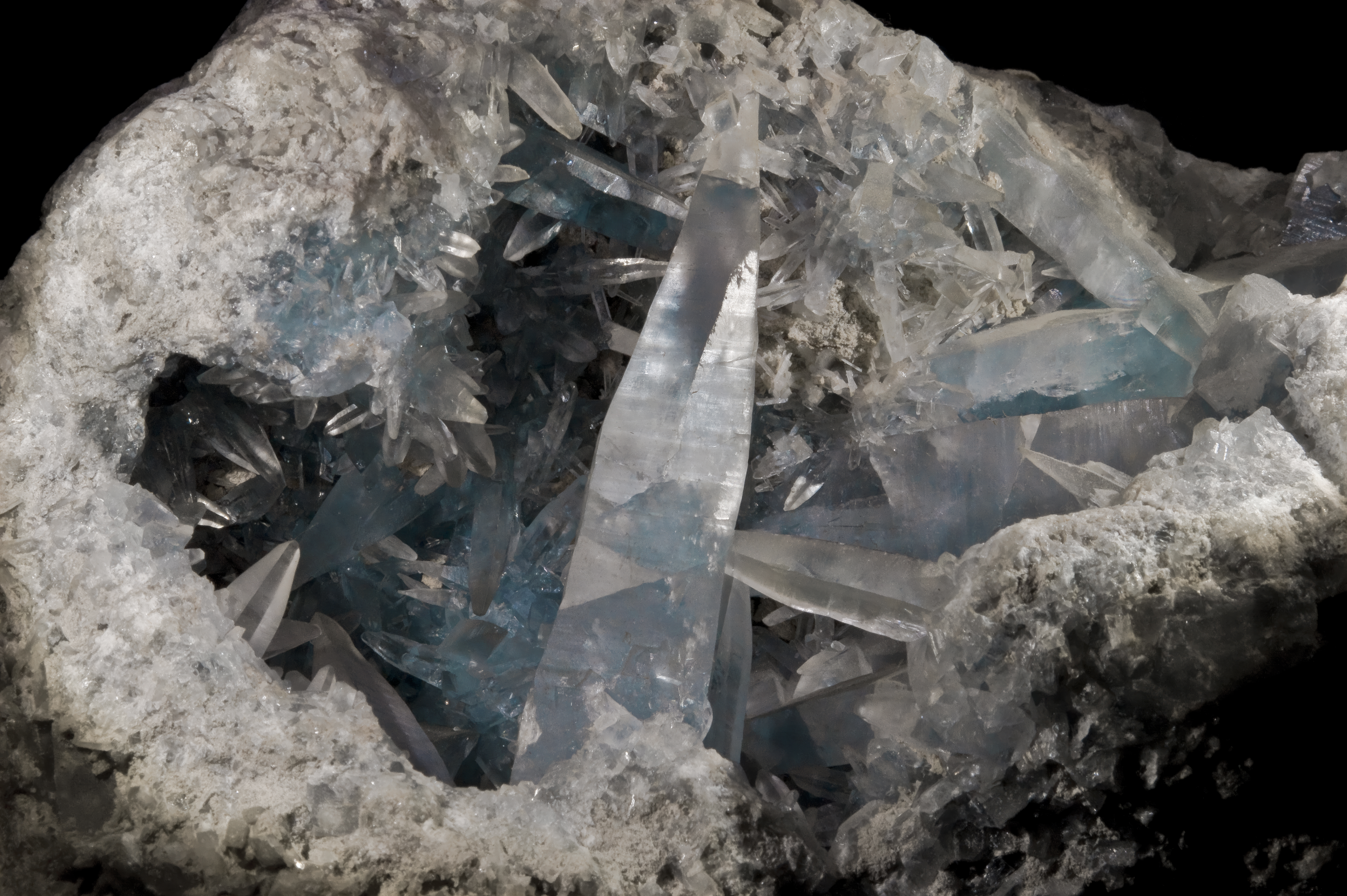
Celestine geode section

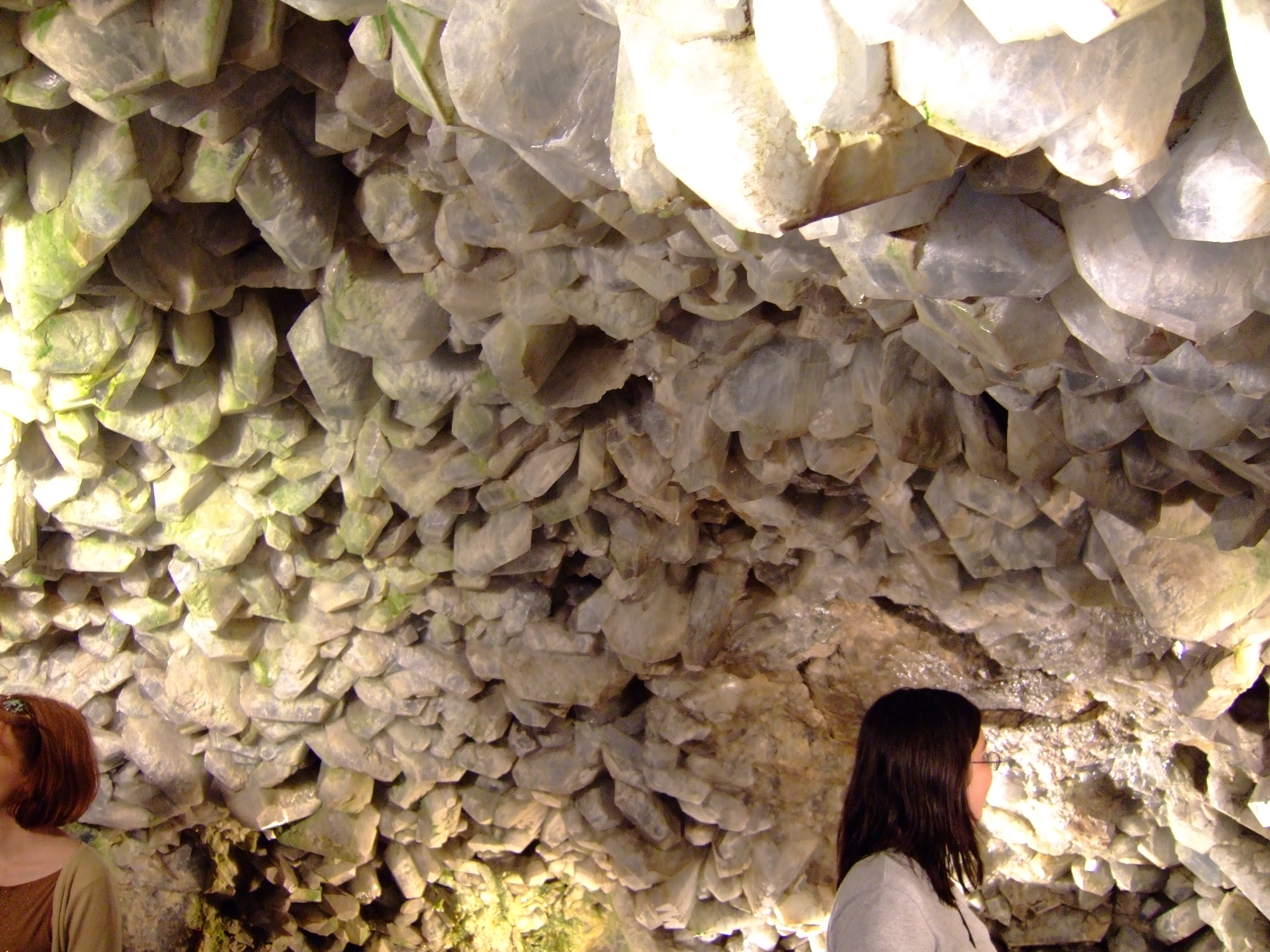
Inside the Crystal Cave geode in Ohio

== See also ==
- List of minerals
