= Augustin-Pierre Dubrunfaut =

French chemist (1797–1881)

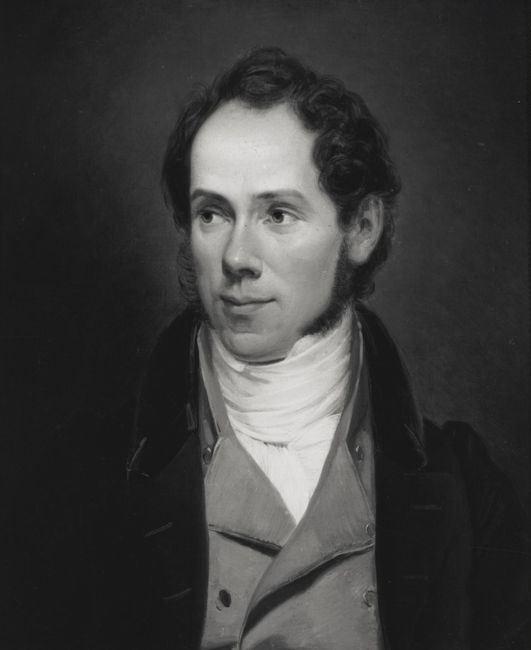
Portrait by Henri Serrur, 1828

Augustin-Pierre Dubrunfaut (French pronunciation: [ogystɛ̃ pjɛʁ dybʁœ̃fo]; Lille, 1 September 1797 – Paris, 7 October 1881) was a French chemist.

Mutarotation was discovered by Dubrunfaut in 1844, when he noticed that the specific rotation of aqueous sugar solution changes with time. In the same paper, he also identified that the inversion of sucrose in the presence of brewer's yeast (Saccharomyces cerevisiae) was not a consequence of fermentation. The organic fructose molecule was subsequently discovered by Dubrunfaut in 1847. He also discovered maltose, although this discovery was not widely accepted until it was confirmed in 1872 by Cornelius O'Sullivan.

== Works ==
- Art de fabriquer le sucre de betteraves, contenant 1. la description des meilleures méthodes usitées pour la culture et la conservation de cette racine
- Traité complet de l'art de la distillation Paris: Bachelier, 1824
