= John Leslie Jambor =

Canadian geologist and mineralogist

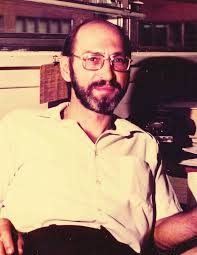
- John Leslie Jambor
- Born: July 10, 1936; Rouyn-Noranda, Quebec, Canada
- Died: January 18, 2008 (aged 71); British Columbia, Canada
- Education: M.Sc. in Geology – University of British Columbia (1960); Ph.D. Carlton University (1966)
- Known for: Outstanding contributions in the field of mineralogy
- Scientific career
- Fields: Geology, Mineralogy

John Leslie Jambor (July 10, 1936 – January 18, 2008) was a Canadian geologist and mineralogist. Jambor was an exceptional figure in the field of mineralogy and a major contributor to the Mineralogical Association of Canada (MAC).
Jambor has a Scopus h-index of 38.

== Life and work ==
The son of first-generation Slovak immigrants, Jambor was born in Rouyn-Noranda, Quebec where he spent the first decade of his life. At the age of 10, Jambor and his family moved to Burnaby, British Columbia. He developed an interest in the earth sciences at an early age and after graduating from Burnaby South Secondary School enrolled into the University of British Columbia to study Geology. During summers, Jambor took to traveling British Columbia, Yukon, and the Northwest Territories to expand his studies in geology. A major area of study was Jambor’s research on jarosite, a mineral found in the oxidized zones of sulfide deposits formed in groundwater.

Jambor began his jarosite related research by studying the occurrence of fault zones at the Keno Hill deposit in Yukon. In 1960, Jambor continued his undergraduate studies at UBC where he completed his M.Sc. work with the focus of his thesis research on veneniferous interlava sediments in the Campbell River area of British Columbia. Shortly after the completion of his M.Sc., Jambor joined the Geological Survey of Canada in Ottawa and published three of his first journal articles in The Canadian Mineralogist. In his first journal article, Jambor discussed his first mineral species discovery, gunningite (a zinc sulfate discovered in the Keno Hill region in the Yukon). Jambor went on to discover 34 new minerals over the course of his career. His work in the field of mineralogy and involvement with The Canadian Mineralogist led him to become the second editor at the helm of this journal.

Jambor was involved in multiple mineralogical projects throughout his time with the Geological Survey of Canada. He assisted with the porphyry copper deposits in British Columbia, the Cobalt-Gawganda arsenide silver arsenide deposits in Ontario, the Strange Lake rare-earth deposits in Quebec, the VMS-type deposits in Newfoundland, the base metal deposits in New Brunswick, and rare-earth deposits in the Northwest Territories.

In 1966, Jambor submitted his eight new sulfosalt discoveries from the Bancroft, Ontario, region to Carleton University for his Ph.D. dissertation. He later became de facto as exclusive member of the “Sulfosalt Club” which consisted of only a few world specialists in the field of mineralogy and the study of some of the most complex atomic systems in nature.

In 1975, Jambor’s began working with CANMET (Canada Centre for Mineral and Energy Technology), where he transitioned to working in the field of mine waste mineralogy. He spent the remainder of his career at CANMET where he carried on studying new mineral species until he retired in 1993. Upon retirement from CANMET, Jambor moved back to the Greater Vancouver area and continued his work in applied mineralogy as the head of Leslie Research and Consulting. His work then focused on the mobilization of toxic elements in groundwater supply and studying its consequences at engineering project sites. During this time Jambor was an associate professor at the University of Waterloo and the University of British Columbia. In addition to his contributions to the Canadian Mineralogist, Jambor also worked with the American Mineralogist on a volunteer basis where he was the New Minerals editor and helped in editing the description of all new mineral species worldwide.

John Leslie Jambor is known for his work in the field of earth sciences, particularly in the focused field of sulfate minerals.

Jambor died on January 18, 2008, after a ten-month battle with cancer.

== Selected works ==
Jambor received several awards during his career and obtained 134 refereed publications as well as 200 other reports that are credited in his name. Below is a selection of these publications.

=== General Publications ===
- 1967-1968: New lead sulfantimonides from Madoc, Ontario. Part 1-3. In: Canadian Mineralogist Volume 9, pp. 7–24; pp. 191–213 and pp. 505–521
- 1972: The silver-arsenide deposits of the Cobalt-Gowganda Region, Ontario. In: Canadian Mineralogist. Volume 11, pp. 1–7; pp. 12–33; pp. 34–75; pp. 232–262; pp. 272–304; pp. 305–319; pp. 320–357 and pp. 402–413
- 1999: Nomenclature of the alunite supergroup. In: Canadian Mineralogist. Volume 37, pp. 1323–1441

=== Books ===
- John L. Jambor, TJ Barrett: Seafloor Hydrothermal Mineralization. Mineralogist Association of Canada, Montreal 1988
- John L. Jambor, David J. Vaughan: Advanced Microscopic Studies of Ore Minerals. Mineralogical Association of Canada, Ottawa 1990
- John L. Jambor: VMS and Carbonate-hosted Polymetallic Deposits of Central Mexico. British Columbia and Yukon Chamber of Mines 1999
- Charles N. Alpers, John L. Jambor, Darrell Kirk Nordstrom: Sulfate Minerals: Cyristallography, Geochemistry, and Environmental Significance. Mineralogical Society of America 2000, ISBN 978-0-93995-052-2

== Honours ==
- “Hawley Medal” for best paper published in The Canadian Mineralogist (1970)
- "Queen's Silver Jubilee Medal" (1977)
- "Berry Medal" for his outstanding contribution and lifetime membership to the Mineralogical Association of Canada (1992)
- “Barlow medal” & "Julian Boldy Memorial Award" of the Canadian Institute of Mining, Metallurgy and Petroleum (CIM) (1993)
- "Peacock Medal" (formerly Past Presidents' Medal) (2002)

== Mineral discoveries ==
- Gunningite (1962) A new zinc sulphate from the Keno Hill-Galena Hill area, Yukon.
- Poitevinite (1964)
- Moorhouseite and Aplowite (1965) New cobalt minerals from Walton, Nova Scotia.
- Mckinstryite (1966) A new copper-silver sulfide.
- Tintinaite (1968) The antimony analogue of kobellite.
- Bismuthian robinsonite (1968)
- Weloganite (1968) A new strontium zirconium carbonate from Montreal Island.
- Muskoxite (May–June 1969) A new hydrous magnesium-ferric iron oxide from the muskox, Northwest Territories.
- Dresserite (1969) The new barium analogue of dundasite.
- Dadsonite (minerals Q and QM) (1969) A new lead sulphantimonide.
- Jamborite (1973) A new nickel hydroxide mineral from the northern Apennines, Italy.
- Hydrodresserite (1977) A new Ba-Al carbonate from a silicocarbonatite sill, Montreal Island, Quebec.
- Strontiodresserite (1977) A new Sr-Al carbonate from Montreal Island, Quebec.
- Nickelbischofite (1979) A new nickel chloride hydrate, CO, United States.
- Sabinaite (1980) A new anhydrous zirconium-bearing carbonate mineral from Montreal Island, Quebec.
- Franconite (1984) A new hydrated Na-Nb oxide mineral from Montreal Island, Quebec.
- Montroyalite (1986) A new hydrated Sr-Al hydroxycarbonate from the Francon Quarry, Montreal, Quebec.
- Hochelagaite (1986) A new calcium-niobium oxide mineral from Montreal, Quebec.
- Harrisonite (1993) A new calcium iron silicate-phosphate from Arcedeckne Island, District of Franklin, Arctic Canada Roberts, A.C.
- Pringleite and Ruitenbergite (1993) Two new mineral species from Sussex, New Brunswick Roberts, A. C.
- Clinoatacamite (1996) A new polymorph of Cu.
- Gallobeudantite (1996) A new mineral species from Tsumeb, Namibia, and associated new gallium analogues of the alunite.
- Zajacite-(Ce) (1996) A new rare-earth fluoride from the Strange Lake deposit, Quebec-Labrador.
- Gerenite-(Y) (1998) A new mineral species, and an associated Y-bearing gadolinite-group mineral, from the strange Lake Peralkaline complex, Quebec-Labrador.
- Sidpietersite (October 1999) A new thiosulfate-bearing mineral species.
- Cobaltarthurite (April 2002)
- Nikischerite (March/April 2003) A new mineral from the Huanuni tin mine, Dalence Province, Oruro Department, Bolivia Huminicki.
- Potassic-carpholite (February 2004) A new mineral species from the sawtooth batholith, Boise county, Idaho, U.S.A.
- Calvertite, Cu (December 2007) A new mineral species from Tsumeb.
- Barahonaite-(Al) and barahonaite-(Fe) (February 2008) A new Ca-Cu arsenate mineral species, from Murcia Province, southeastern Spain, and Gold Hill, Utah
- Burgessite, co (February 2009) A new arsenate mineral species from the Keeley mine, South Lorrain township, Ontario, Canada
