= Louis J. Cabri =

Canadian mineralogist

Louis Jean-Pierre Cabri (born February 23, 1934) is a Canadian scientist in the field of platinum group elements (PGE) mineralogy with expertise in precious metal mineralogy and base metals at the Canada Centre for Mineral and Energy Technology (CANMET). He was first a research scientist before becoming a principal scientist (1996–1999). In the 1970s he discovered two new Cu–Fe sulfide minerals, "mooihoekite" and "haycockite". In 1983 Russian mineralogists named a new mineral after him: cabriite.

== Family ==
Cabri was born in Cairo, Egpyt, as the son of Ludovicus Petrus Maria Cabri (born in Antwerp, Belgium) and Cézarinne-Marie Kahil (born in Alexandria, Egypt). His family is of Dutch Huguenot descent (from 's-Hertogenbosch, Netherlands) with its origins from Saint-Jean-du-Gard, France. He is married to a Canadian ceramic artist Mimi Mignon De Meillon. He has 5 children.

== Education ==
- 1954 : B.Sc. (Geology and Chemistry) — University of the Witwatersrand
- 1955 : B.Sc. (Geology — Honours) — University of the Witwatersrand
- 1961 : M.Sc. (Appld) — McGill University
- 1965 : Ph.D. — McGill University

== Scientific achievements ==
The Royal Society of Canada wrote that:

(Cabri) attained international eminence for his work on sulphides and tellurides, on the platinum-groupminerals, and ... for pioneering mineralogical applications of micro-beam trace-element analytical techniques such as micro-Proton-induced X-ray emission (PIXE) and Secondary-Ion Mass Spectrometry (SIMS). His fundamental work on the platinum-group minerals has brought order and understanding to a previously chaotic field of knowledge.

He started his scientific career with numerous field explorations in Africa countries such as Ghana, Sierra Leone, Zimbabwe and South Africa. Later, he pursued phase-stability and crystal-chemistry relationships in the [Cu–Fe–S] (Copper-Iron-Sulfide) System, which led to his discovery in 1972 of two new Cu–Fe sulfide minerals, "Mooihoekite" and "Haycockite". He went on researching platinum group minerals, and characterised this group and their crystal chemistry, nomenclature, geochemistry and geological occurrence. He has studied many of the world's PGM deposits, both primary and placer, for example in Sudbury (Ontario), Tulameen River (British Columbia), Stillwater Complex (Montana), Itabira (Brazil), Norilsk–Talnakh and Kondyor Massif (Russia), Great Dyke (Zimbabwe), Freetown Complex (Sierra Leone), Onverwacht, the Witwatersrand Reef and the Merensky Reef (South Africa).

In 1983, Russian mineralogists named a new mineral after him: Cabriite.

Nationally and internationally, he served as chairman and president for a number of geological and mineralogical associations and has chaired and co-chaired numerous technical meetings. He serves as a consultant to industry, government organizations and universities in Canada and abroad, independently since 1999 and as the principal of CNT-Mineral Consulting since 2005.

== Professional awards ==
- Selwyn Blaylock Medal, Canadian Institute of Mining & Metallurgy (2004)
- P.Geo. - Association of Professional Geoscientists of Ontario (2002)
- Fellow, Royal Society of Canada (2001)
- Leonard G. Berry Medal, Mineralogical Association of Canada (1993);
- Waldemar Lindgren Award for Excellence in Research by the Society of Economic Geologists in 1965 for his article "Phase relations in the Au-Ag-Te system and their mineralogical significance." published in 1965 in Economic Geology, 60, 1569-1606.

== Publications ==
=== Books ===
- 2002 The Geology, Geochemistry, Mineralogy, and Mineral Beneficiation of the Platinum-Group Elements. Edited by L.J. Cabri. Canadian Institute of Mining, Metallurgy and Petroleum, Special Volume 54, 852 pages.
- 1999 Analytical Technology in the Mineral Industries, Proceedings 128th TMS Annual Meeting & Exhibition, Eds.: L.J. Cabri, C.H. Bucknam, E.B. Milosavljevic, S.L. Chryssoulis and R. A. Miller (Warrendale, PA: The Minerals, Metals, and Materials Society, 1999), 281 pages.
- 1998 Advanced Methods in Ore and Environmental Mineralogy, Eds. L.J. Cabri & D.J. Vaughan, Mineralogical Association of Canada, Short Course Volume 27, 434 pages.
- 1981 Platinum-Group elements: Mineralogy, Geology, Recovery, Editor and principal contributor, CIM Special Volume 23, 267 pages. 2nd edition reprinted 1989.

=== Articles ===
Louis Cabri has published over 200 articles about mineralogy, including:

- McDonald, A.M., Proenza, J.A., Zaccarini, F., Rudashevsky, N.S., Cabri, L.J., Stanley, C.J., Rudashevsky, V.N., Melgarejo, J.C., Lewis, J.F., Longo, F. and Bakker, R.J. (2010). Garutiite, (Ni,Fe,Ir), a new hexagonal polymorph of native Ni from Loma Peguera, Dominican Republic. European Journal of Mineralogy, 22, 293–304.
- Cabri, L.J., Choi, Y., Nelson, M., Tubrett, M., & Sylvester, P.J. (2010) Advances in Precious Metal Trace Element Analyses for Deportment using LAM-ICPMS, in Proceedings of 42nd Annual meeting of The Canadian Mineral Processors, 181–196.
- Cabri, L.J., Martin, C.J., & Nelson, M. (2009) Deportment methodology for low-grade Ni-Cu-PGE ores. Proceedings of 48th Conference of Metallurgists, (eds. C. Hamilton, B. Hart & P.J. Whittaker), 3–15.
- Zaccarini, F., Proenza, J.A., Rudashevsky, N.S., Cabri, L.J., Garuti, G., Rudashevsky, V.N., Melgarejo, J.C., Lewis, J.F., Longo, F., Bakker, R.J., and Stanley, C.J. (2009) The Loma Peguera ophiolitic chromitite (Central Dominican Republic): a source of new platinum group mineral (PGM) species. N. Jb. Miner. Abh., 185/3, 335–349.
- Thorne, K.G., Lentz, D.R., Hoy, D., Fyffe, L.R., and Cabri, L.J. (2008) Characteristics of Mineralization at the Main Zone of the Clarence Stream Gold Deposit, Southwestern New Brunswick, Canada: Evidence for an Intrusion-Related Gold System in the Northern Appalachian Orogen. Exploration and Mining Geology, Vol. 17, Nos. 1–2, p. 13–49.
- Oberthür, T., Melcher, F., Sitnikova, M., Rudashevsky, N.S., Rudashevsky, V.N., Cabri, L.J., Lodziak, J. Klosa, D. and Gast, L. (2008) Combination of Novel Mineralogical Methods in the Study of Noble Metal Ores – Focus on Pristine (Bushveld, Great Dyke) and Placer Platinum Mineralisation. Ninth International Congress for Applied Mineralogy ICAM 2008. The Australasian Institute of Mining and Metallurgy, Publication Series No 8/2008, 187–194.
- K Kojonen, K., Cabri, L.J., McMahon, G., Johanson, B., Leppinen, J. and Kalapudas, R. (2008) Applied Mineralogy of the Suurikuusikko Refractory Gold Deposit, Northern Finland. Ninth International Congress for Applied Mineralogy ICAM 2008. The Australasian Institute of Mining and Metallurgy, Publication Series No 8/2008, 277–284.
- Cabri, L.J., Y. Choi, C. H. Hamilton, P. Kondos, and R. Lastra (2008) Hydroseparation concentrates and automated precious metal searches used to characterise process products from selected mines. Ninth International Congress for Applied Mineralogy ICAM 2008. The Australasian Institute of Mining and Metallurgy, Publication Series No 8/2008, 261–264.
- Cabri, L.J., Rudashevsky, N.S., Rudashevsky, V.N. (2008) Current approaches for the process mineralogy of platinum-group element ores and tailings. Ninth International Congress for Applied Mineralogy ICAM 2008. The Australasian Institute of Mining and Metallurgy, Publication Series No 8/2008, 9–17.
- McDonald, A.M., Cabri, L.J., Rudashevsky, N.S., Stanley, C.J., Rudashevsky, V.N. and Ross, K.C. (2008) Nielsenite, PdCu3, a new platinum-group intermetallic mineral from the Skaergaard Intrusion, Greenland. Canadian Mineralogist, 46, 709–716.
