= Jagoite =

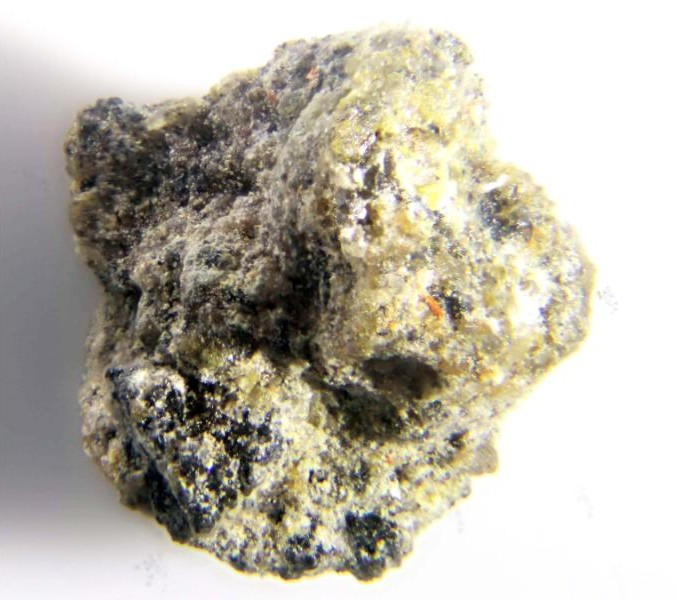
- Image of Jagoite

General
- Category: Minerals
- Formula: Pb_{2.4}Na_{0.2}Ca_{0.1}Fe^{3+}_{0.8}Mg_{0.2}Si_{3.1}O_{10}Cl_{0.8}(OH)_{0.2}
- IMA symbol: Jg
- Crystal system: Hexagonal

Identification
- Color: Yellow-green
- Cleavage: Perfect
- Fracture: Flexible
- Mohs scale hardness: 3
- Lustre: Vitreous
- Streak: Yellow
- Specific gravity: 5.43
- Density: 5.43 g/cm^{3}
- Optical properties: Uniaxial (−)
- Refractive index: nω = 2.000 nε = 1.970
- Birefringence: 0.030
- Pleochroism: none

Jagoite is a hexagonal-ditrigonal, dipyramidal, yellow-green lead-silicate mineral consisting of calcium, chlorine, hydrogen, iron, lead, magnesium, oxygen, silicon, and sodium. Its discovery was first published in 1957.

== Etymology ==
It is named after John B. Jago Trelawney, an American mineral collector.

== Properties ==
It is said to have a vitreous (glass-like) lustre.

Jagoite is composed of tiny yellow crystals that span less than 0.2mm.

== Distribution ==
This rare mineral is located in Långban Mine, Långban Ore District, Filipstad, Värmland County, Sweden, found inside hematite ore. It is also associated with Melanotekite and Quartz.

== Media appearances ==
It is featured in Stardew Valley as a minor item obtained from geodes.

== See also ==
- Nekoite
- Jamborite
