= Jambor =

Jambor is a surname. Notable people with the name include:

- Agi Jambor (1909–1997), Hungarian pianist
- John Leslie Jambor (1936-2008), Canadian geologist and mineralogist
- József Jámbor (born 1957), Hungarian high jumper
- Lajos "Louis" Jambor (1884–1954), Hungarian-born American painter, muralist, and illustrator.
- Milan Jambor (born 1975), Slovak footballer
- Nikola Jambor (born 1995), Croatian footballer
- Timotej Jambor (born 2003), Slovak footballer
