= Playfairite =

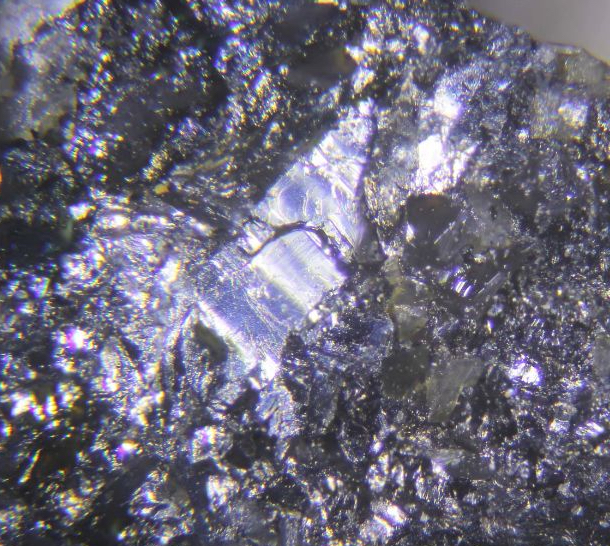

General
- Category: Sulfosalt minerals, Sulfides
- Formula: Pb_{16}Sb_{18}S_{43}
- IMA symbol: Pyf
- Strunz classification: 2.LB.30 (10 ed); 2/E.20-40 (8 ed)
- Dana classification: 3.6.4.1
- Crystal system: Monoclinic; Unknown space group

Identification
- Color: Lead gray to black
- Cleavage: Perfect
- Mohs scale hardness: 3.5-4
- Luster: Metallic
- Streak: Black
- Specific gravity: 5.72
- Pleochroism: Strong reflection

Playfairite is a rare sulfosalt mineral with chemical formula Pb_{16}Sb_{18}S_{43} in the monoclinic crystal system, named after the Scottish scientist and mathematician John Playfair. It was discovered in 1966 by the Canadian mineralogist John Leslie Jambor. Lead gray to black in color, its luster is metallic. Playfairite shows strong reflection pleochroism from white to brownish gray. Playfairite has a hardness of 3.5 to 4 on Mohs scale and a specific gravity of approximately 5.72.

The type locality is Taylor Pit (Concession XIV; Lot 13), Huntingdon Township, Hastings County in Ontario, Canada. Small deposits have also been found in Les Cougnasses Mine, Orpierre in the Haut-Alpes in France, Khaidarkan Sb-Hg deposit (Chaidarkan), Fergana Valley, Alai Range, Osh Oblast, Kyrgyzstan and Reese River District, Lander County, Nevada, USA.

== See also ==
- List of minerals recognized by the International Mineralogical Association
