= Aplowite =

Very rare mineral

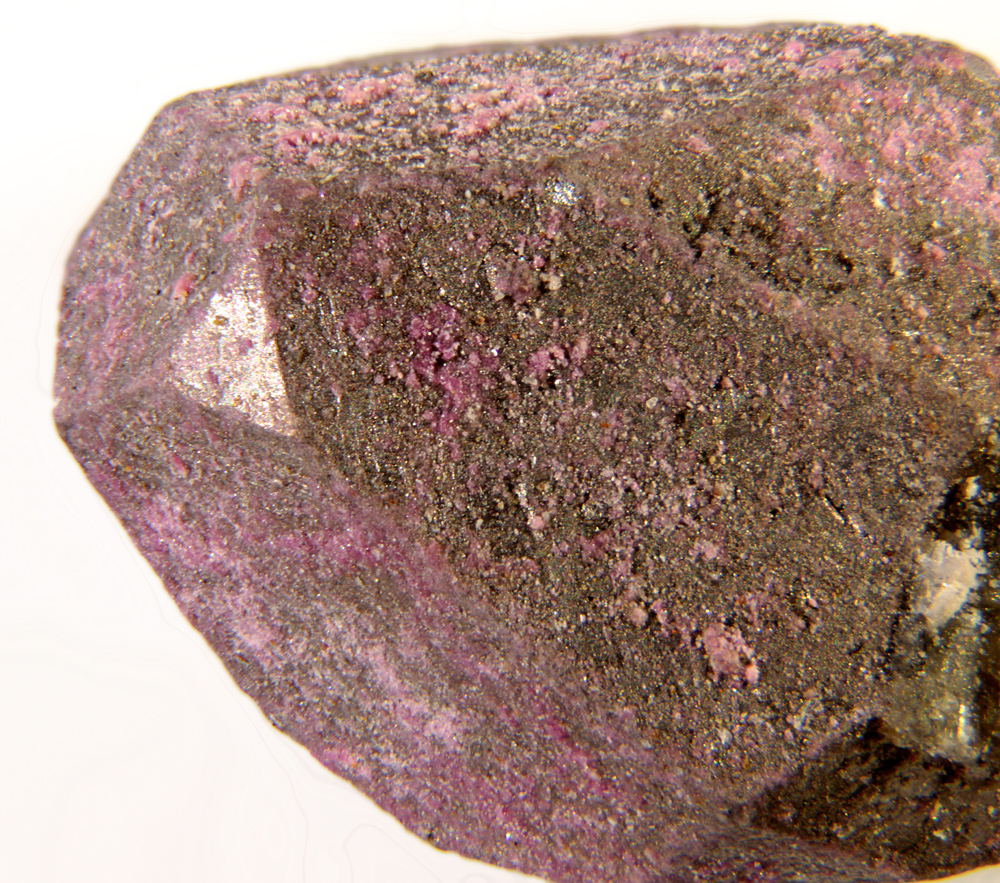
- Aplowite on a cobaltite crystal

General
- Category: Rozenite
- Formula: (Co,Mn,Ni)SO4 · 4H2O
- IMA symbol: Apw
- Crystal system: monoclinic
- Crystal class: Prismatic - 2/m

Identification
- Color: bright pink, light pink in light
- Mohs scale hardness: 3
- Luster: Vitreous (Glassy)
- Streak: white
- Diaphaneity: transparent
- Density: 2.33 g/cm3 (Measured) 2.36 g/cm3 (Calculated)
- Optical properties: Biaxial (–). α = 1.528 β = n.d. γ = 1.536
- 2V angle: n.d.
- Solubility: soluble in water

Aplowite is a very rare mineral with the formula CoSO_{4}•4H_{2}O, a naturally occurring cobalt(II) sulfate tetrahydrate. It is the lower hydrate when compared to bieberite (heptahydrate) and moorhouseite (hexahydrate), and a higher hydrate when compared to cobaltkieserite (monohydrate). It occurs together with moorhouseite within efflorescences.
