= Nekoite =

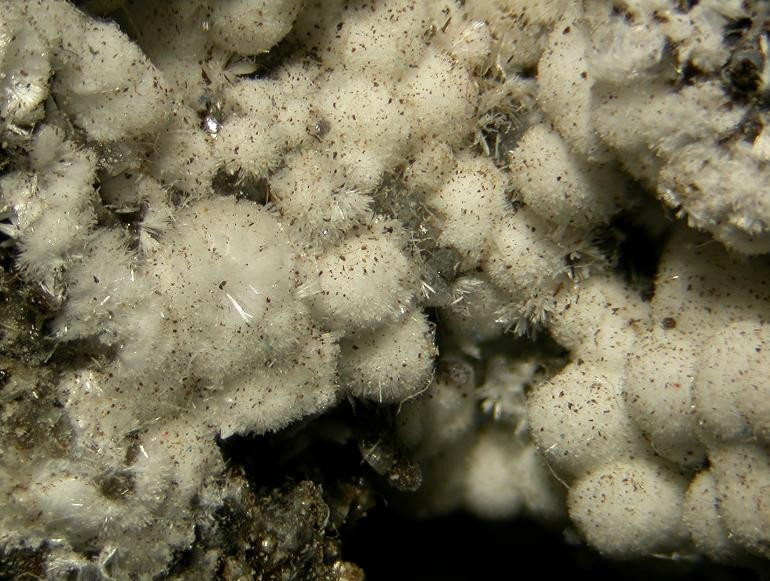
- Nekoite from Iron Cap Mine, Landsman Camp, Arizona

General
- Category: Minerals
- Formula: Ca_{3}Si_{6}O_{15}·7H_{2}O
- IMA symbol: Nk
- Crystal system: Triclinic

Identification
- Color: White
- Cleavage: Distinct/Good
- Lustre: Vitreous
- Streak: White
- Density: 2.21 g/cm^{3}
- Pleochroism: Non-pleochroic
- Dispersion: r > v weak

Nekoite is a triclinic, white silicate mineral consisting of calcium, silicon, oxygen and water. Its discovery was first published in 1956.

== Etymology ==
Its name derives from reversing "Oken" from Okenite (named after the German naturalist Lorenz Oken), which it was originally mistaken for due to their similar appearances.

== Properties ==
This translucent crystal is described as having a pearl white color. It is also said to have a vitreous (glass-like) lustre.

== Location ==
Nekoite is a very rare mineral, but has been found in Landsman Camp in Arizona; Crestmore Crestmore Heights in California; Koch-Bulach in Uzbekistan; and Caxias do Sul in Brazil.

== Media appearances ==
It is featured in Stardew Valley as a minor item obtained from geodes.

== See also ==
- Jagoite
- Jamborite
