= Ann Sabina =

Canadian mineralogist and author (1930–2015)

Ann Phyllis Sabina Stenson (28 January 1930 – 29 September 2015) was a Canadian mineralogist, gemmologist, teacher, public servant and popular science author. Sabina has been instrumental in the development of X-ray diffraction as a means of identifying minerals. She is credited with the discovery of a variety of different minerals and currently has one named in her honor: Sabinaite. a string of educational books and guides that focus on the study of numerous minerals throughout Canada, and has been important in the creation of a number of geological associations.

== Life ==
Ann Phyllis Sabina was born in Lemberg, Saskatchewan on January 28, 1930. Sabina attended and graduated from the University of Manitoba with a Bachelor of Science degree in Geology in 1952. Later that same year, she was taken aboard the Geological Survey of Canada (GSC) in Ottawa, and was hired as a specialist in X-ray diffraction analysis. During her more than 50-year career with the Geological Survey of Canada (GSC) Sabina was instrumental in developing a catalog of diffraction spectra and representative specimens for many hundreds of minerals that would come to be used by researchers around the world.

With geology budding into the limelight of the modern day masses, Sabina wrote guidebooks of the different minerals maintained along Canada's major highways and what geological attributes to expect when driving on them. In addition to her mineralogical work, Sabina was author of the popular "Rocks and Minerals for the Collector" and "Rock and Mineral Collecting in Canada" book series. These were intended as guides for the general public and were published by the Geological Survey of Canada (GSC), in both English and French, as part of the organization's report series. Ultimately, the two collections comprised 17 individual regional guides and have been credited with having "inspired many to-go rock, mineral and fossil hunting." Ann retired in the late nineties but continued to work in the field of mineralogy up until August 2015. She later died on September 29, 2015, at the age of 86.

== Discoveries ==
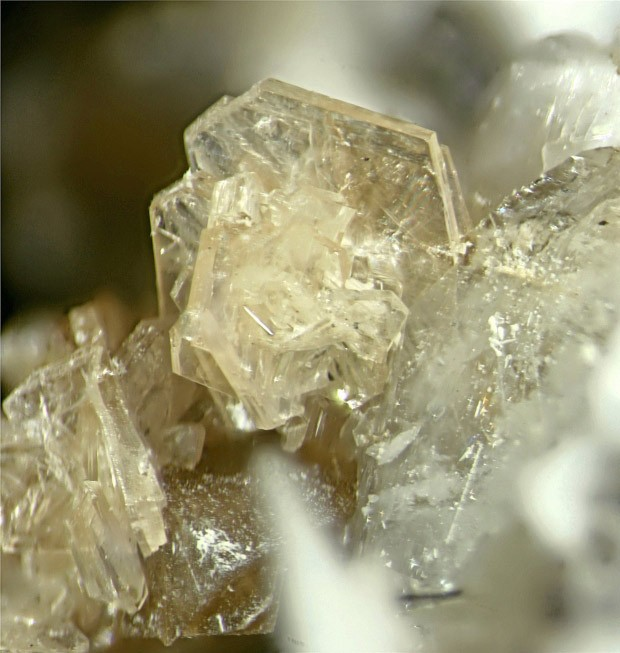
Sabinaite, a carbonate mineral named for Ann Sabina in 1980

As part of her research, Sabina and a student assistant visited the Francon quarry located in Montreal on July 19, 1966 in order to study and contribute information for the Ontario to Lac St. Jean Quebec guidebook (GSC Paper 67-51). Women were not allowed to use the quarry due to security and insurance reasons, so Sabina took liberty and paid a young man working in the quarry 5 dollars and asked that he bring her samples. In her research, she noticed some small, yellow crystals in the retrieved samples and upon further testing she discovered that the mineral was not contained within her X-ray powder diffraction database; thus she had discovered an entirely new mineral. Sabina named this new mineral Weloganite, named after the founder of the GSC, Sir William Logan. The local news later reported the discovery but Sabina was not initially appropriately credited with the discovery. Ann continued to frequent the quarry for research and quickly discovered four more previously unknown minerals. By the end of her examination of the Fracon quarry, Ann Sabina was recognized for collecting 9 of 10 new mineral specimens by 1990: Weloganite, Dresserite, Hydrodresserite, Strontiodresserite, Sabinaite, Franconite, Doyleite, Hochelagaite, Montroyalite and Voggite. In 1980, the mineral Sabinaite, was named in her honor.

== Awards ==
Sabina was the recipient of The International Centre for Diffraction Data (ICDD) award in 2016 and was nominated for the same award in 2002. In 1977, Sabina received the Queen's Silver Jubilee Medal, recognizing her actions in the scientific community. In 1994, she received the Berry Medal from the Mineralogical Association of Canada. The medal is awarded every year to a successful service to the Mineralogical Association of Canada in a selected role. Sabina was a treasurer at this society for more than 25 years. The Mineralogical Association of Canada also established the "Ann Sabina Award" in her honor. The Mineralogical Association of Canada decides on the greatest collection that is self-collected and displayed at the annual show competition, who receives this award. In 2009, Sabina was acknowledged for her excellent mineralogy contributions in Canada and received the “Elsa and László Horváth Prize” award from the Club de minéralogie de Montréal.
