= Cabriite =

Platinum group mineral

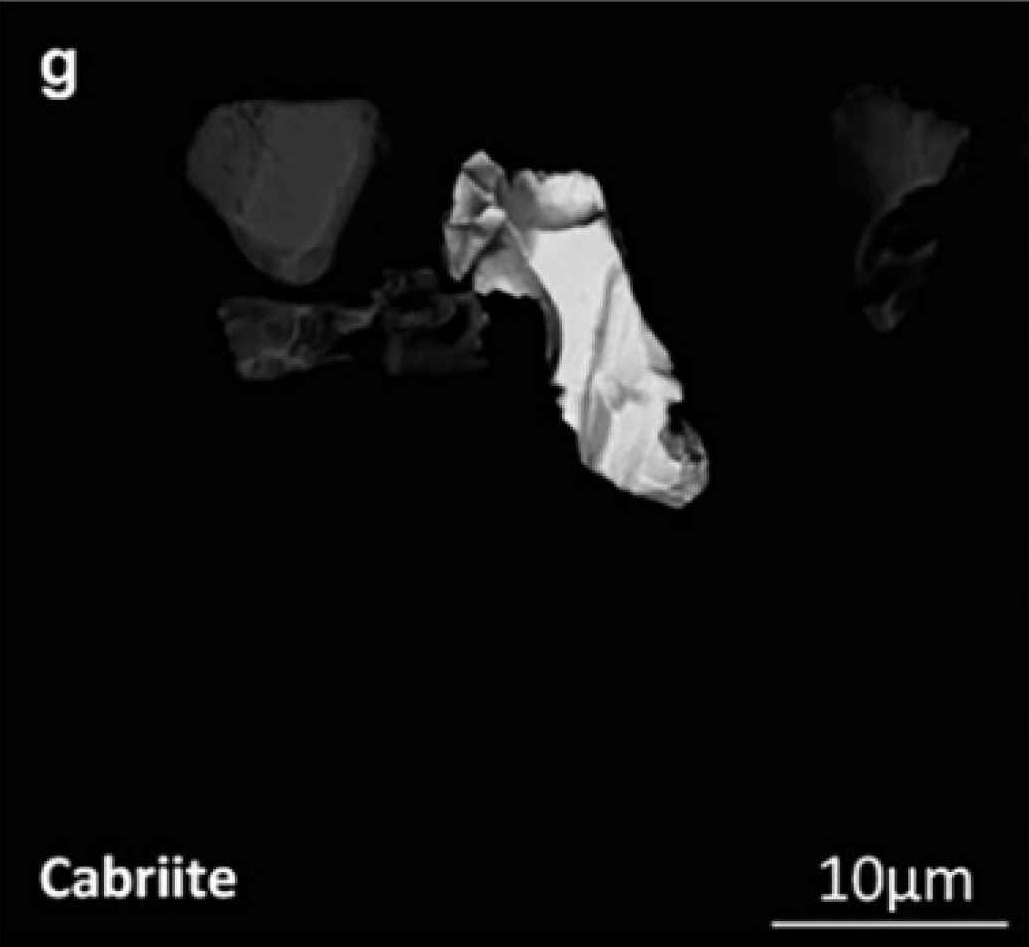
- BSE images of platinum-group minerals - Cabriite

General
- Category: Platinum Group mineral
- Formula: Pd_{2}SnCu
- IMA symbol: Cbr
- Strunz classification: 1.AG.30
- Dana classification: 1.2.11
- Crystal system: Orthorhombic
- Crystal class: Dipyramidal (mmm); H-M symbol: (2/m 2/m 2/m)
- Space group: Pmmm

Identification
- Formula mass: 395.10 g/mol
- Color: grey white
- Mohs scale hardness: 4–4.5
- Luster: Metallic
- Diaphaneity: opaque
- Density: 11.1 (measured) 10.7 (calculated)
- Optical properties: Anisotrophic
- Pleochroism: detectable
- Ultraviolet fluorescence: none

Cabriite (Pd_{2}SnCu) is a mineral first found in the eastern Siberian region of Russia and named for the Canadian mineralogist Louis J. Cabri (born 1934).
