= Moorhouseite =

Sulfate mineral

General
- Category: Sulfate mineral
- Formula: CoSO_{4}•6H_{2}O
- IMA symbol: Mh
- Strunz classification: 7.CB.25
- Crystal system: Monoclinic
- Crystal class: Prismatic (2/m) (same H-M symbol)
- Space group: C2/c
- Unit cell: a = 10.03, b = 7.23, c = 24.26 [Å], β=98.37^{o} (approximated); Z = 8

Identification
- Color: Pink
- Crystal habit: granular; in crusts and efflorescences
- Fracture: Conchoidal
- Mohs scale hardness: 2.5
- Luster: Vitreous
- Streak: White
- Density: 1.97-2.02 (measured)
- Common impurities: Ni, Mn, Cu, Fe

Moorhouseite is a rare mineral with the formula CoSO_{4}•6H_{2}O, a naturally occurring cobalt(II) sulfate hexahydrate. It is the lower-hydrate-equivalent of bieberite (heptahydrate) and aplowite (hexahydrate). It is also hydrated equivalent of cobaltkieserite. It occurs together with moorhouseite within efflorescences found in the Magnet Cove Barium Corporation mine in Walton, Nova Scotia, Canada.

== Notes on chemistry ==
Relatively high amounts of nickel and manganese were reported, with trace amounts of copper and iron.

== Crystal structure ==
Analysis of synthetic analogue of moorhouseite revealed, that its structure may be described as containing:

- Co(H_{2}O)_{6} octahedra, forming alternate layers
- SO_{4} tetrahedra
- hydrogen bonds (two per a single water molecule)
