= Berry Medal =

Canadian mineralogy award

The Leonard G. Berry Medal is an annual award of the Mineralogical Association of Canada. Established in 1987, it is named after Leonard G. Berry (1914–1982), a Canadian geologist who made notable contributions to mineralogy and who was a founding member of the Association. The award is granted for important contributions to mineral science in Canada or for significant long-term service to the Mineralogical Association of Canada. The medalist is chosen by a committee which includes two past recipients.

== List of recipients ==
- 1987: A. Ronald Graham
- 1988: E.W. (Les) Nuffield
- 1989: Guy Perreault
- 1990: Joseph A. Mandarino
- 1991: Richard A. Alcock
- 1992: John L. Jambor
- 1993: Louis J. Cabri
- 1994: Ann Sabina
- 1995: Robert Gait
- 1996: Sol Kaimai
- 1997: J. Murray Duke
- 1998: Dorian G.W. Smith
- 1999: Norman M. Halden
- 2001: Robert F. Martin
- 2002: Robert T. Downs
- 2003: Gina Lecheminant
- 2004: J. Douglas Scott
- 2005: Pierrette Tremblay
- 2005: Rob Raeside
- 2006: Mati Raudsepp
- 2008: Iain Samson
- 2011: Bob and Fran Pinard
- 2015: Martine M. Savard
- 2016: Jim Nicholls
- 2019: Lee A. Groat
- 2021: Malcolm Back
- 2025: Andrew M. McDonald

== See also ==
- List of geology awards
- List of earth sciences awards
- Prizes named after people
