= John Playfair =

Scottish minister and scientist (1748–1819)

John Playfair FRS, FRSE
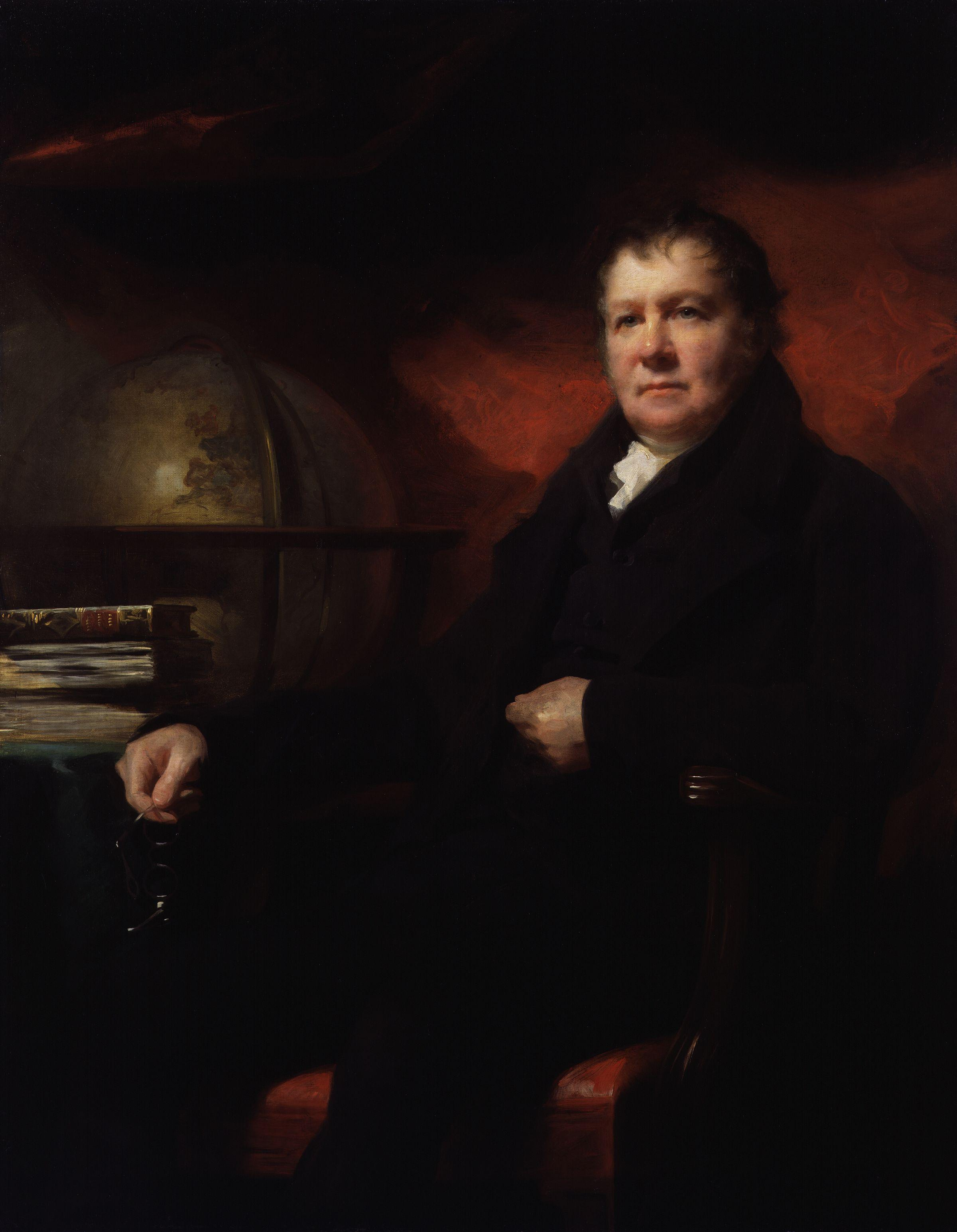
- Born: 10 March 1748; Benvie, Forfarshire, Scotland
- Died: 20 July 1819 (aged 71); Burntisland, Fife, Scotland
- Resting place: Old Calton Burial Ground
- Education: University of St Andrews; University of Edinburgh
- Known for: Playfair's axiom; Playfair's law; Playfair (lunar crater); Playfair (Martian crater); playfairite
- Scientific career
- Fields: Mathematics, natural philosophy, geology
- Workplaces: University of Edinburgh

John Playfair FRSE, FRS (10 March 1748 – 20 July 1819) was a Church of Scotland minister, remembered as a scientist and mathematician, and a professor of natural philosophy at the University of Edinburgh. He is best known for his book Illustrations of the Huttonian Theory of the Earth (1802), which summarised the work of James Hutton. It was through this book that Hutton's principle of uniformitarianism, later taken up by Charles Lyell, first reached a wide audience. Playfair's textbook Elements of Geometry made a brief expression of Euclid's parallel postulate known now as Playfair's axiom.

In 1783 he was a co-founder of the Royal Society of Edinburgh. He served as General Secretary to the society 1798–1819.

== Life ==
Born at Benvie, slightly west of Dundee to Margaret Young (1719/20 – 1805) and Reverend James Playfair (died 1772), the kirk minister of Liff and Benvie.

Playfair was educated at home until the age of 14, when he entered the University of St Andrews to study divinity. He also did further studies at Edinburgh University. In 1766, when only 18, he was a candidate for the chair of mathematics in Marischal College (now part of the University of Aberdeen), and, although he was unsuccessful, his claims were admitted to be high.

Six years later (1772) he applied for the chair of natural philosophy (physics) at St Andrews University, but again without success. In 1773 he was licensed to preach by the Church of Scotland and was offered the united parishes of Liff and his home parish of Benvie (made vacant by the death of his father). However, Playfair chose to continue his studies in mathematics and physics, and in 1782 he resigned his charge to become the tutor of Adam Ferguson. By this arrangement Playfair regularly visited Edinburgh and went on to cultivate the literary and scientific society for which the city was at that time specially distinguished. In particular, he attended the natural history course of John Walker. Through Nevil Maskelyne, whose acquaintance he had first made in the course of the celebrated Schiehallion experiments in 1774, he also gained access to the scientific circles of London. In 1785 when Dugald Stewart succeeded Ferguson in the University of Edinburgh Chair of Moral Philosophy, Playfair succeeded the former to become the chair of mathematics.

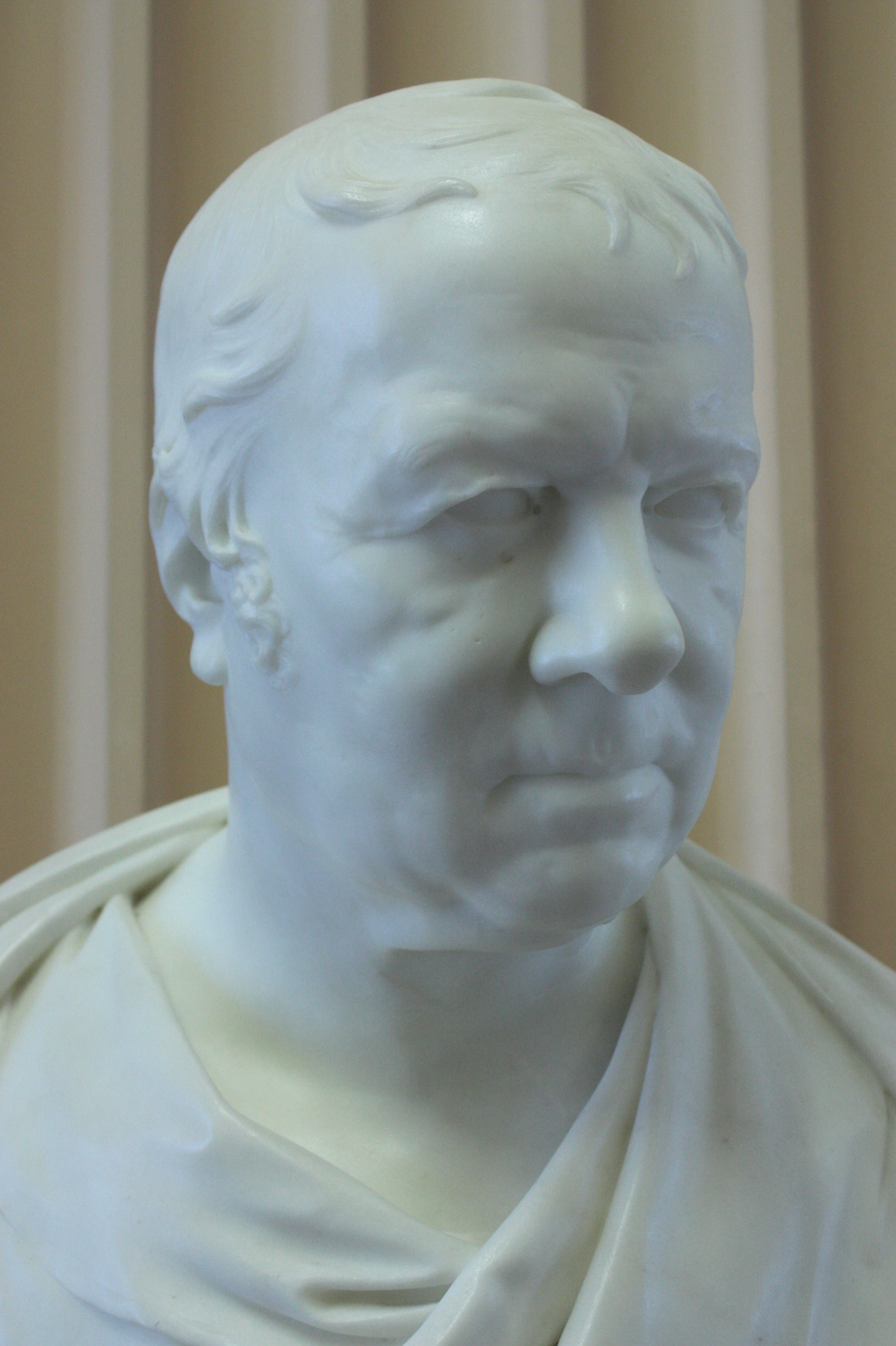
Sir John Playfair by Sir Francis Chantrey

In 1795 Playfair published an alternative, more stringent formulation of Euclid's parallel postulate, which is now called Playfair's axiom. Although the axiom bears Playfair's name, he did not create it, but credited others, in particular William Ludlam with its prior use.

In 1802 Playfair published his celebrated volume entitled Illustrations of the Huttonian Theory of the Earth. The influence exerted by James Hutton on the development of geology is thought to be largely due to its publication. In 1805 Playfair exchanged the Chair of Mathematics for that of natural philosophy in succession to John Robison, whom also he succeeded as general secretary to the Royal Society of Edinburgh. He took a prominent part, on the liberal side, in the ecclesiastical controversy that arose in connection with Sir John Leslie's appointment to the post he had vacated, and published a satirical letter (1806).

He moved from 6 Buccleuch Place to a new house at 2 Albany Street (then called Albany Row) in 1807.

Playfair was an opponent of Gottfried Leibniz's vis viva principle, an early version of the conservation of energy. In 1808, he launched an attack on John Smeaton and William Hyde Wollaston's work championing the theory. In 1808 he also published a review of Laplace's Traité de Mécanique Celeste.

He died at 2 Albany Street on 20 July 1819. He is buried nearby in Old Calton Burial Ground (a secular burial ground).

== Family ==
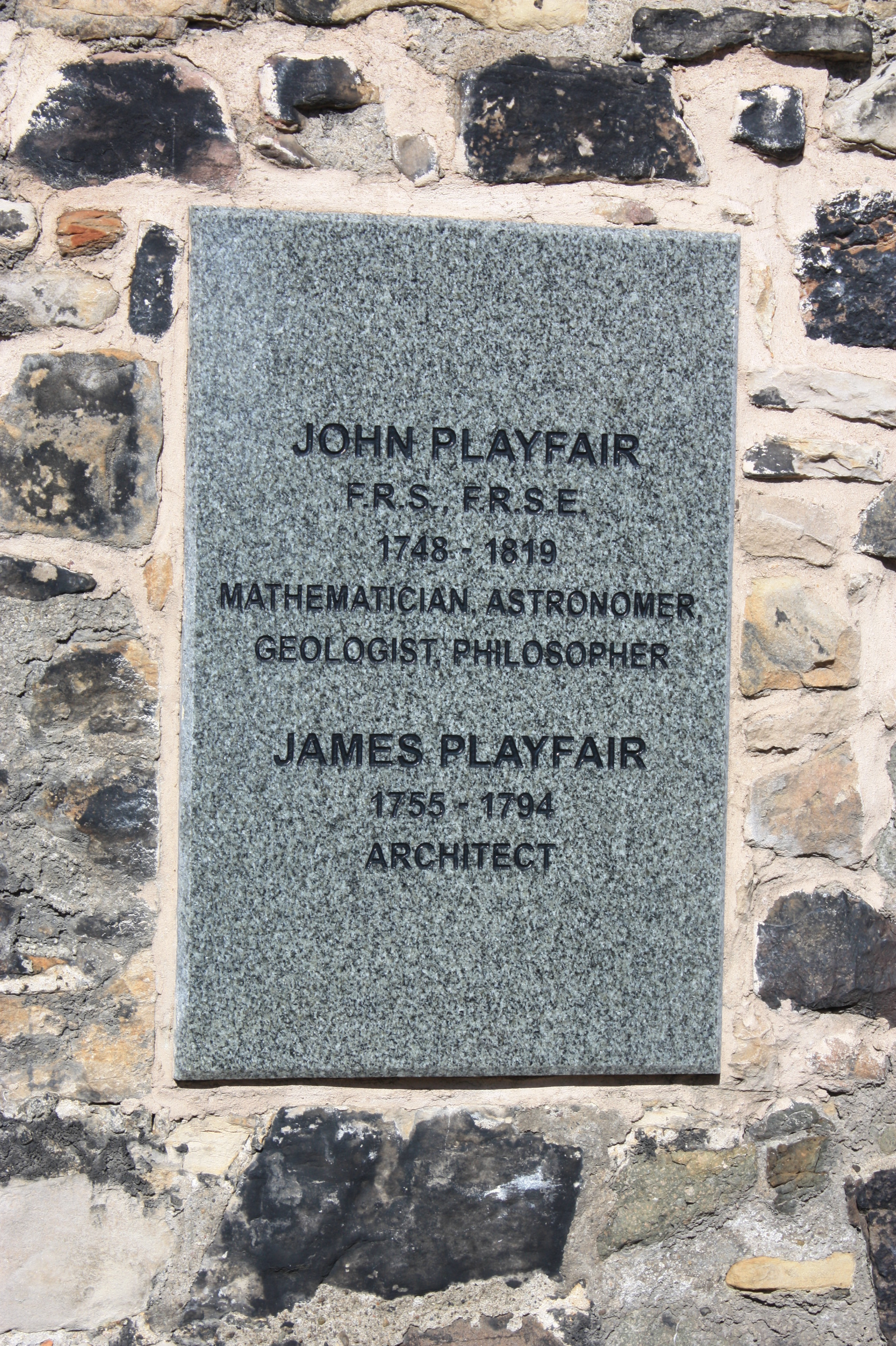
Memorial to John Playfair, Old Calton Burial Ground, Edinburgh

Playfair's brothers were architect James Playfair, solicitor Robert Playfair and engineer William Playfair. His nephew, William Henry Playfair (1790–1857) was an eminent architect in Scotland.

In later life he admired and proposed to the wealthy widow Jane Apreece. She turned him down and married Sir Humphry Davy.

He died of strangury on 20 July 1819, and, although an eminent man, was buried in an unmarked grave in Old Calton Burial Ground, on Waterloo Place in Edinburgh. His, and his brother, James's graves were marked by a plaque unveiled in 2011 following a local campaign. The monument to his memory by William Henry Playfair, on Calton Hill, is visible from the spot.

== Honours ==
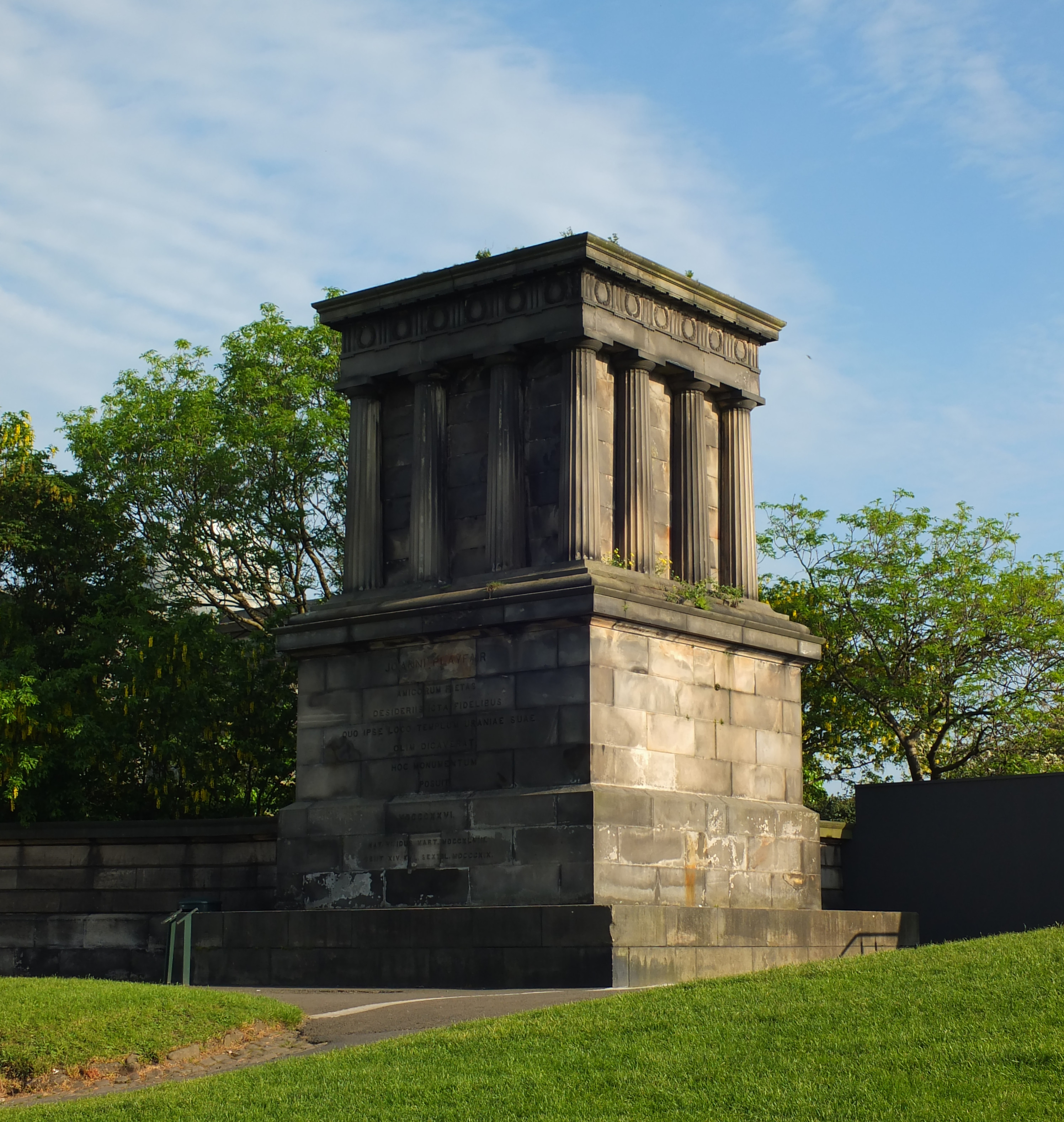
Monument to John Playfair on Calton Hill, Edinburgh

- Fellow of the Royal Society of Edinburgh
- Fellow of the Royal Society of London, 1807
- Craters on Mars and the Moon were named in his honour.
- The mineral playfairite was named in his honour.

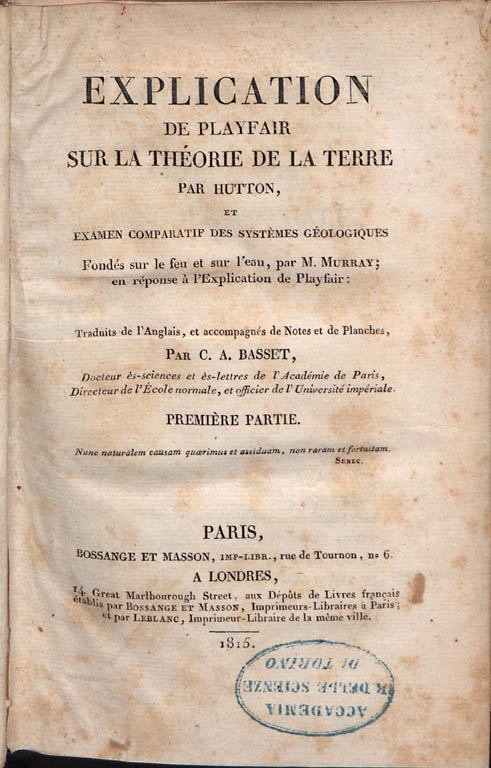
Explication de Playfair sur la Théorie de la Terre, 1815

== Works ==
- Illustrations of the Huttonian theory of the Earth (in French). London: Pierre François Jean Baptiste Leblanc. 1815.

== Critical bibliography ==
A four-volume collected edition of Playfair's works, with a memoir by James G. Playfair, appeared at Edinburgh in 1822.

His writings include a number of essays contributed to the Edinburgh Review from 1804 onwards, various papers in the Philosophical Transactions of the Royal Society (including his earliest publication, "On the Arithmetic of Impossible Quantities", 1779, and an "Account of the Lithological Survey of Schehallion", 1811) and in the Transactions of the Royal Society of Edinburgh ("On the Causes which Affect the Accuracy of Barometrical Measurements" and others), the articles "Aepinus" and "Physical Astronomy", and a "Dissertation on the Progress of Mathematical and Physical Science since the Revival of Learning in Europe" in the Encyclopædia Britannica (Supplement to fourth, fifth and sixth editions). He also took an interest in Indian astronomy and compared them with traditional and ancient astronomy from Egypt and Greece. He also examined Indian concepts in trigonometry.

His Elements of Geometry first appeared in 1795 and has passed through many editions; his Outlines of Natural Philosophy (2 vols., 1812–1816) consist of the propositions and formulae which were the basis of his class lectures. Playfair's contributions to pure mathematics were not considerable, his papers "On the Arithmetic of Impossible Quantities" and "On the Causes which Affect the Accuracy of Barometrical Measurements", and his Elements of Geometry, all already referred to, being the most important. His lives of Matthew Stewart, Hutton, and Robison, many of his reviews, and above all his "Dissertation" are of the utmost value.
