= Leonard G. Berry =

Canadian mineralogist (1914–1982)

- Born: Leonard Gascoigne Berry; 1914; Toronto, Ontario, Canada
- Died: June 29, 1982 (aged 68); Westport, Ontario, Canada
- Known for: Berryite; Berry Medal
- Spouse: May Catherine Milthorpe

Academic background
- Education: University of Toronto (BA, MA, PhD)

Academic work
- Institutions: Queen's University at Kingston
- Main interests: Mineralogy; crystal structure; X-ray diffraction; sulfide; sulfosalt mineral

Leonard Gascione Berry (1914 – June 29, 1982) was a Canadian geologist and mineralogist. He was Miller Memorial Professor Emeritus of Mineralogy and Crystallography at Queen's University at Kingston and published early studies of X-ray diffraction in minerals. He discovered the mineral berryite in 1965.

The Berry Medal, awarded annually by the Mineralogical Association of Canada, is named in his honor.

== Early life and education ==
Berry was born in Toronto in 1914. He studied geology and mineralogy at the University of Toronto, where he earned a Bachelor of Arts in 1937 and a Master of Arts in 1938. As a student, he did field work at the Geological Survey of Canada and the Ontario Department of Mines. He studied under Martin A. Peacock and received a doctorate in 1941.

== Career ==
After graduating during World War II, Berry spent four years as a scientist studying optics at Research Enterprises in Toronto. He joined Queen's University in Kingston, Ontario, in 1944 as a lecturer before becoming a professor in the Department of Geological Sciences. In 1967, he was appointed Miller Memorial Research Professor at Queen's.

His research focused on the morphology and structure of minerals and particularly on crystal structure. He used crystallography and X-ray diffraction to study mineral structure and did extensive work on sulfosalt minerals and sulfides. He collaborated with scientists including Brian Harold Mason, Peter Bayliss, and Mary E. Mrose. In 1962, Berry published a compendium of X-ray powder data for ore minerals along with Raymond M. Thompson. He identified berryite, a mineral that occurs in sulfide bearing quartz veins in Colorado, using X-ray diffraction in 1965.

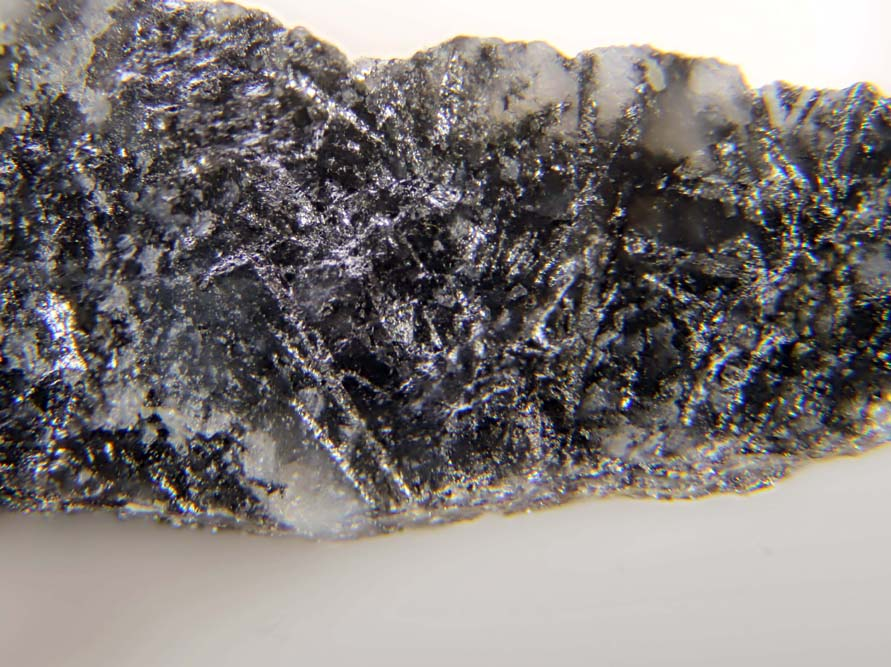
Berryite, identified in 1965

Berry served on the senate of Queen's University from 1970 to 1973. He was the chair of undergraduate studies in the Department of Geological Sciences from 1955 to 1970 and of graduate studies from 1970 to 1977, and he was chairman of the graduate mathematics and physical sciences division from 1975 to 1978.

He retired in 1979. He was a fellow and president of the Mineralogical Society of America and helped found the International Mineralogical Association and Mineralogical Association of Canada. He edited multiple peer-reviewed scientific journals on mineralogy.

In 1983, the Mineralogical Association of Canada established the Berry Medal in his honor.

== Personal life ==
Berry married May Catherine Milthrope in 1941. The couple lived in Westport, Ontario and had two children. He died in Westport in 1982.

== Books ==
- Mineralogy: Concepts, Destinations, Determinations. W. H. Freeman and Company, 1959. LCCN 59007841.
- Elements of Mineralogy. W. H. Freeman and Company, 1968. ISBN 9780716702351.
