= Berryite =

Sulfosalt mineral

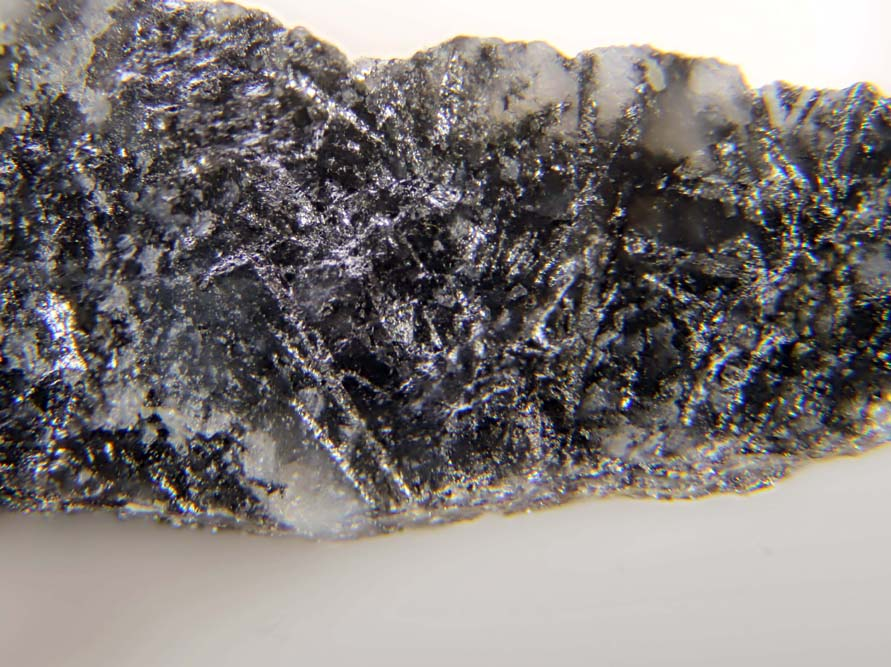
- Black acicular crystals of the rare Pb-Ag sulfide from a Colorado locality: Mike Mine, San Juan County, Colorado, United States

General
- Category: Minerals
- Formula: Cu_{3}Ag_{2}Pb_{3}Bi_{7}S_{16}
- IMA symbol: Bry
- Strunz classification: 2.HB.20d (10th)
- Dana classification: 3.6.15.1
- Crystal system: Monoclinic
- Crystal class: 2/m (Prismatic)
- Unit cell: 1,445.93 Å^{3}

Identification
- Colour: Bluish-grey, white, grey-white
- Twinning: Repeated
- Cleavage: Poor/indistinct
- Mohs scale hardness: 3.5
- Luster: Metallic
- Diaphaneity: Opaque
- Specific gravity: 6.7
- Density: 6.7 g/cm^{3} (measured)
- Pleochroism: Weak

Berryite is a mineral with the formula Pb_{3}(Ag,Cu)_{5}Bi_{7}S_{16}. It occurs as gray to blue-gray monoclinic prisms. It is opaque and has a metallic luster. It has a Mohs hardness of 3.5 and a specific gravity of 6.7.

It was first identified in 1965 using X-ray diffraction by mineralogist Leonard G. Berry (1914–1982). It is found in Park and San Juan counties in Colorado. It occurs in sulfide bearing quartz veins in Colorado and with siderite-rich cryolite in Ivigtut, Greenland.
