= Weloganite =

Carbonate mineral

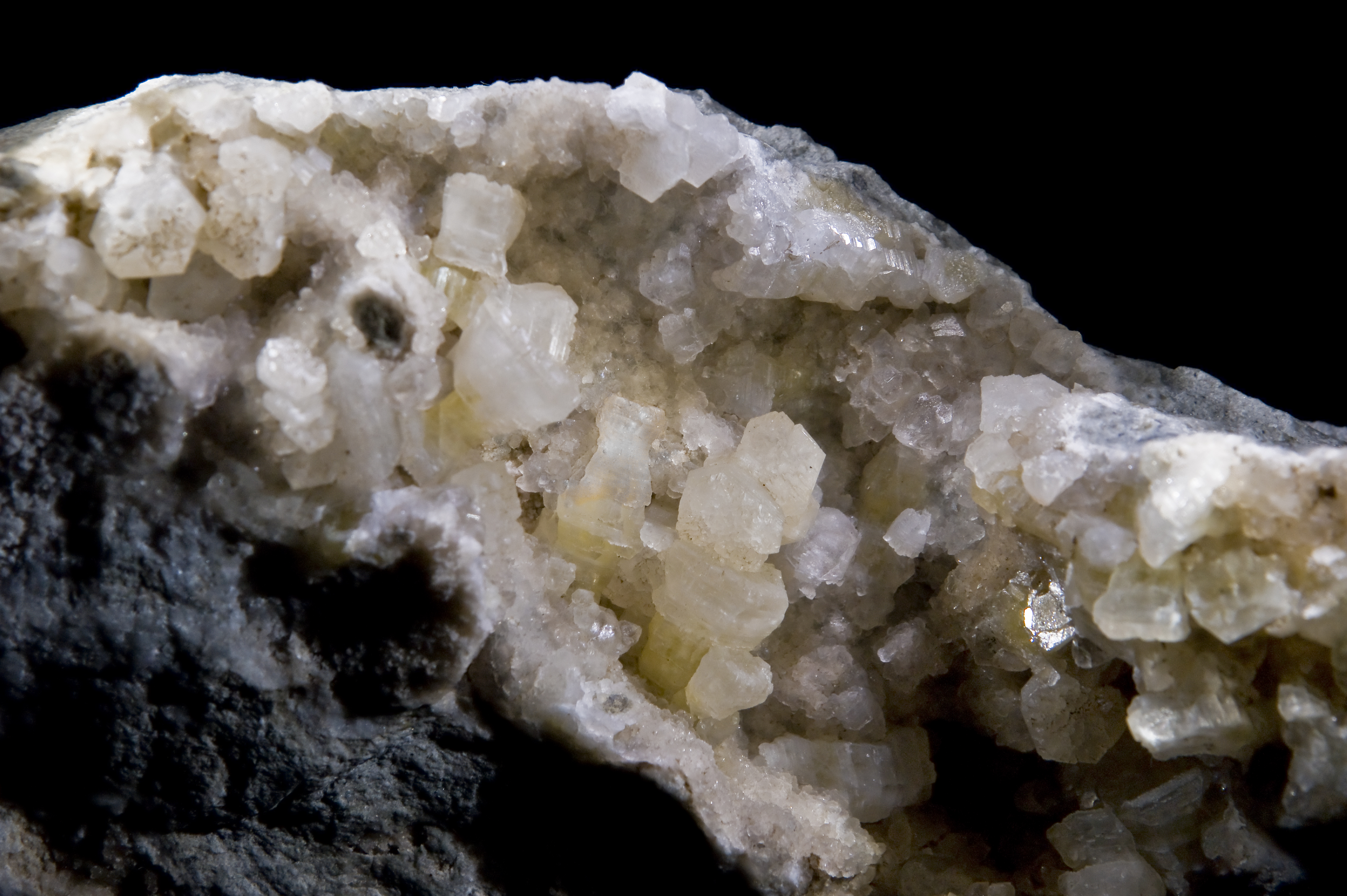

General
- Category: Carbonate mineral
- Formula: Na_{2}(Sr,Ca)_{3}Zr(CO_{3})_{6}·3H_{2}O
- IMA symbol: Wlg
- Strunz classification: 5.CC.05
- Dana classification: 15.3.4.4
- Crystal system: Triclinic
- Crystal class: Pedial (1) (same H-M symbol)
- Space group: P1
- Unit cell: a = 8.966 Å, b = 8.98 Å c = 6.73 Å; α = 102.72° β = 116.65°, γ = 60.06°; Z = 1

Identification
- Formula mass: 814.16 g/mol
- Color: Yellow, pale yellow, amber, tan, white
- Crystal habit: Roughly hexagonal, tapering crystals, pseudorhombohedral
- Twinning: About [103] repeated at 120 degrees
- Cleavage: Perfect on pseudo {0001}
- Fracture: Conchoidal
- Mohs scale hardness: 3 1/2
- Luster: Vitreous
- Streak: White
- Diaphaneity: translucent
- Specific gravity: 3.20–3.22
- Optical properties: Biaxial (−)
- Refractive index: n_{α} = 1.558 n_{β} = 1.646 n_{γ} = 1.640
- Birefringence: δ = 0.082
- 2V angle: Measured: 15°
- Dispersion: Weak
- Other characteristics: Pyroelectric. triboluminescent.

Weloganite is a rare carbonate mineral with the formula: Na_{2}(Sr,Ca)_{3}Zr(CO_{3})_{6}·3H_{2}O. It was discovered by Canadian government mineralogist Ann P. Sabina in 1967 and named for Canadian geologist Sir William Edmond Logan (1798–1875). It was first discovered in Francon Quarry, Montreal, Quebec, Canada and has only been reported from a few localities worldwide.

== Properties ==
It is usually white, lemon yellow, or amber in color, and can be translucent. It crystallizes in the triclinic system and shows pseudo-hexagonal crystal forms due to twinning. The width of the crystals typically undulates down the length, forming crystals that widen in the middle or flare out at the end. Crystals are affected by light and can develop a white alteration coating over time. Weloganite is triboluminescent, producing blue light.

== Occurrence ==
The mineral occurs in an igneous carbonatite sill in Montreal, Quebec, Canada in the Francon Quarry where it was first discovered. It also occurs in the Mont Saint-Hilaire district. Associated minerals include strontianite, dawsonite and calcite. It has also been reported from the Pilansberg Complex of the western Bushveld Igneous Complex in South Africa.

== See also ==
- List of minerals
- List of minerals named after people
