= Wheal Alfred =

Lead and copper mine in Cornwall, England

Coordinates: 50.1837°N 5.3921°W

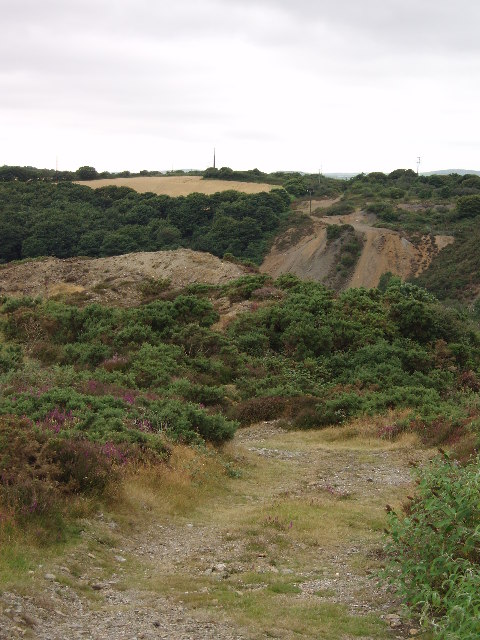
Spoil heaps at Wheal Alfred

Wheal Alfred is the site of a former copper and lead mine and a designated Site of Special Scientific Interest (SSSI) in west Cornwall, England, UK. The mine is located 1 mile (1.6 km) east of the town of Hayle and is also a Geological Conservation Review site. The mine is famous to geologists for its important mineral specimens such as mimetite and pyromorphite.
