= Jamborite =

Hexagonal mineral

General
- Category: Minerals
- Formula: Ni^{2+}_{1-x}Co_{3+x}(OH)_{2-x}(SO_{4})_{x} · nH_{2}O
- IMA symbol: Jbr
- Crystal system: Hexagonal

Identification
- Color: Green
- Cleavage: Perfect
- Specific gravity: 2.67
- Density: 2.67 g/cm^{3}
- Optical properties: Uniaxial (−)
- Refractive index: nω = 1.607 nε = 1.602
- Birefringence: 0.0050

Jamborite is a hexagonal-trigonal, green, mineral consisting of nickel, cobalt, hydroxides and sulphur. Its discovery was first published in 1973.

== Etymology ==
It is named after John Leslie Jambor, a Canadian geologist.

== Properties ==
It has a lamellar structure, superficially resembling grass.

It was formerly believed to be in the hydrotalcite supergroup, but was later disproved.

== Distribution ==
This mineral has been found in the Northern Apennines of Italy, Spain and Wales.

== Media appearances ==
It is featured in the Stardew Valley video game as a minor item obtained from geodes.

== See also ==
- Nekoite
