= Mooihoekite =

Copper iron sulfide mineral

General
- Category: Sulfide mineral
- Formula: Cu_{9}Fe_{9}S_{16}
- IMA symbol: Mho
- Strunz classification: 2.CB.10b
- Crystal system: Tetragonal
- Crystal class: Scalenohedral (4̅2m); H-M symbol: (4̅ 2m)
- Space group: P4̅2m
- Unit cell: a = 10.58 Å, c = 5.38 Å; Volume = 602.22 Å^{3}; Z = 1

Identification
- Formula mass: 1,587.59 g/mol
- Color: Pale yellow. Tarnishes to pinkish brown and purple
- Crystal habit: Granular - Generally occurs as anhedral to subhedral crystals in matrix
- Mohs scale hardness: 4
- Luster: Metallic
- Streak: Black
- Diaphaneity: Opaque
- Specific gravity: 4.36
- Optical properties: Weakly anisotropic

Mooihoekite is a copper iron sulfide mineral with chemical formula of Cu_{9}Fe_{9}S_{16}. The mineral was discovered in 1972 and received its name from its discovery area, the Mooihoek mine in Transvaal, South Africa.

== Crystal structure and optical properties ==
Mooihoekite crystallizes in the tetragonal crystal system. It has a short optical c-axis that is perpendicular to two longer a-axes of equal length. For Mooihoekite, the c-axis is a 4-fold rotoinversion axis.

Mooihoekite is an opaque mineral which shows weak anisotropism in polished section under reflected light microscopy. It goes slightly extinct every 90°.

== Occurrence ==
It is found in massive sulfide from pipe-shaped dunite pegmatite in the norite zone of the Bushveld igneous complex in South Africa. It has also been found in troctolite from the basal Duluth gabbro in Minnesota, US; in the Talnakh area, Norilsk region, western Siberia; at Krzemianka, Poland; in the Malanjkhand copper-molybdenum deposit, Madhya Pradesh, India; and the Stillwater igneous complex in Montana, US.

Mooihoekite occurs in association with haycockite, magnetite, troilite, cuprian pentlandite, mackinawite, sphalerite, and moncheite in the Mooihoek mine and with haycockite, native copper, troilite, pentlandite, cubanite and magnetite in the Duluth complex.

== Uses ==
Mooihoekite is a rare mineral that is mostly used for research purposes. It has similar properties to chalcopyrite CuFeS_{2}, making it helpful in the study of ore deposits and the study of the central portion of the Cu-Fe-S phase system. Mooihoekite, chalcopyrite, talnakhite, and haycockite all play key roles in the study of ore genesis and beneficiation.
