= Sabinaite =

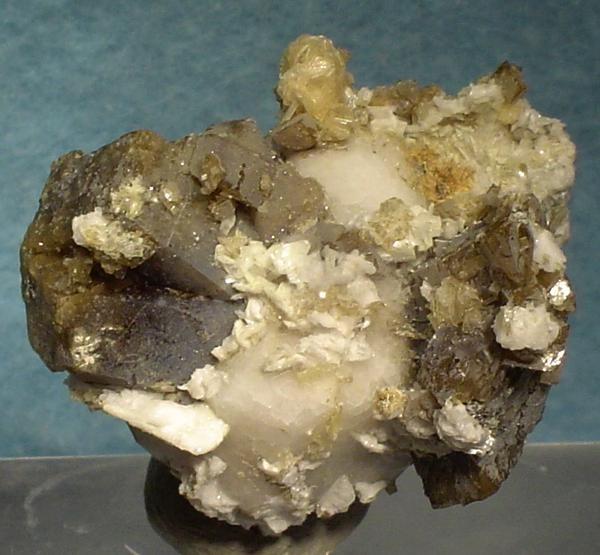
- Tan sabinaite crystals, porcelaneous analcime crystals on a siderite matrix

General
- Category: Carbonate mineral
- Formula: Na_{4}Zr_{2}TiO_{4}(CO_{3})_{4}
- IMA symbol: Sba
- Strunz classification: 5.BB.20
- Crystal system: Monoclinic
- Crystal class: Prismatic (2/m) (same H-M symbol)
- Space group: B2/b

Identification
- Color: Colorless to white
- Luster: Vitreous

Sabinaite (Na_{4}Zr_{2}TiO_{4}(CO_{3})_{4}) is a rare carbonate mineral. It crystallizes in the monoclinic crystal system as colorless to white prisms within cavities. It is more typically found as powdery coatings and masses. It has a specific gravity of 3.36.

It has been found in vugs in a carbonatite sill on Montreal Island and within sodalite syenite in the alkali intrusion at Mont Saint-Hilaire in Quebec, Canada.

It was first described in 1980 for an occurrence in the Francon quarry, Montreal Island. It is named after Ann Sabina (1930–2015), a mineralogist working for the Geological Survey of Canada.
