= Bieberite =

Sulfate mineral

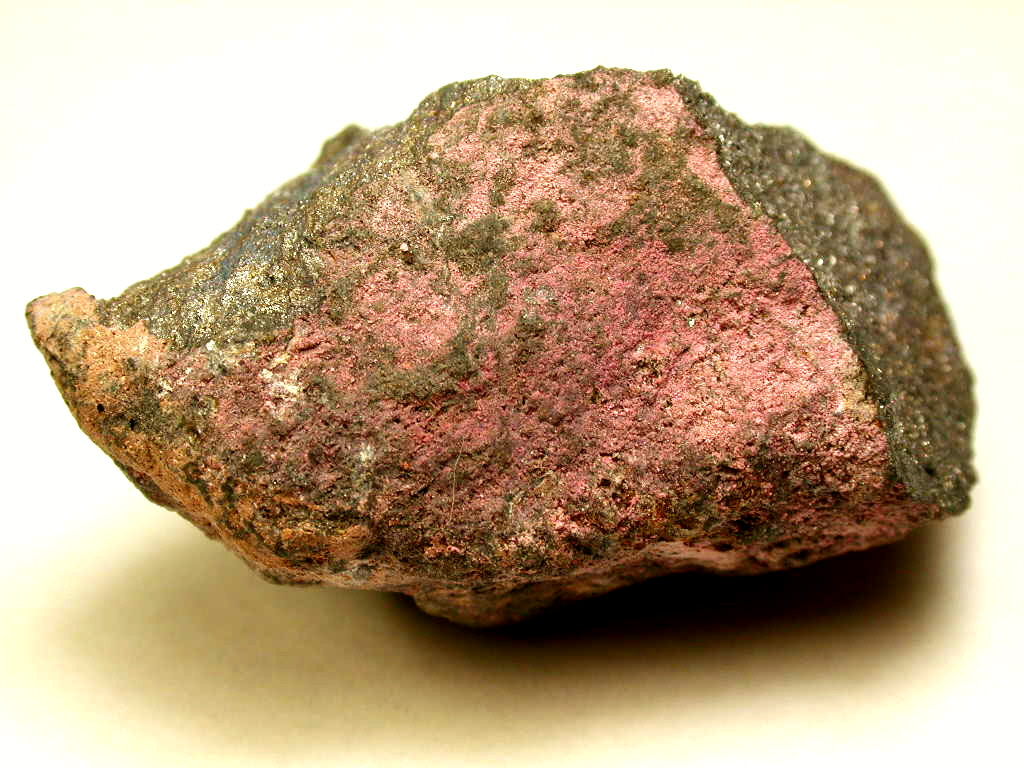
- A 4.4 by 2.7 cm mass of mainly grey bismuth covered by a thin film of pinkish bieberite from an old classic Locality, Schlema, Schlema-Hartenstein District, Erzgebirge, Saxony, Germany

General
- Category: Sulfate mineral
- Formula: CoSO_{4}·7H_{2}O
- IMA symbol: Bie
- Strunz classification: 7.CB.35
- Dana classification: 29.6.10.4
- Crystal system: Monoclinic
- Crystal class: Prismatic (2/m)
- Space group: P2/m

Identification
- Color: Rose-red, red-pink, flesh-red
- Crystal habit: Crusts, stalactites
- Cleavage: {001} perfect, {110} fair
- Mohs scale hardness: 2
- Luster: Vitreous
- Diaphaneity: Subtransparent
- Specific gravity: 1.96
- Density: 1.96 (measured), 1.83 (calculated)
- Optical properties: Biaxial (+), colorless to pale rose color (transmitted light)
- 2V angle: 88° (measured), 88° (calculated)
- Solubility: Soluble in water

Bieberite (CoSO_{4} · 7H_{2}O) is a pinkish red colored sulfate mineral high in cobalt content. The name is derived from the type locality at the copper deposit in Bieber, Hesse, Germany. It has been described and reported as far back as the 1700s. Bieberite primarily occurs as a secondary mineral, forming in cobalt-bearing arsenide and sulfide deposits through oxidation.

Natural bieberite crystals may have a small amount of cobalt lattice sites instead occupied by magnesium and copper (Palache et al., 1960).

== Geologic occurrence ==
Aside from the type locality at Hesse, Germany bieberite has been found in multiple countries in Europe, North and South America, and Africa, as well as in Japan. In Greece bieberite was identified for the first time in the 2000s at the Lavrion Pb-Ag-Zn deposit, a polymetallic sulfide deposit that underwent supergene oxidation during its formation. In England in the United Kingdom, bieberite has been found at mines Penberthy Croft Mine and Wheal Alfred in St Hilary, Cornwall and Phillack, Cornwall respectively.

Bieberite was identified in volcanic cave settings for the first time at Irazú Volcano, Costa Rica and reported in 2018. The mineral roemerite was identified at Island Mountain, Trinity County, California in the United States of America for the first time in association with bieberite along with pyrrhotite, claudetite, goslarite, fibroferrite, and morenosite and a description of the mineral from the site published in 1927. The occurrence of bieberite at the Island Mountain deposit had earlier been recorded in 1923. Uranium mineralization in the Cameron Area of Coconino County, Arizona was found to have bieberite as one of the cobalt mineral species in association with secondary uranium minerals formed through oxidation.

== Bibliography ==
- Palache, P.; Berman H.; Frondel, C. (1960). "Dana's System of Mineralogy, Volume II: Halides, Nitrates, Borates, Carbonates, Sulfates, Phosphates, Arsenates, Tungstates, Molybdates, Etc. (Seventh Edition)" John Wiley and Sons, Inc., New York, pp. 505–507.
