= List of minerals recognized by the International Mineralogical Association (C) =

This list includes those recognised minerals beginning with the letter C. The International Mineralogical Association is the international group that recognises new minerals and new mineral names; however, minerals discovered before 1959 did not go through the official naming procedure, although some minerals published previously have been either confirmed or discredited since that date. This list contains a mixture of mineral names that have been approved since 1959 and those mineral names believed to still refer to valid mineral species (these are called "grandfathered" species).

The list is divided into groups:

- Introduction • (Main synonyms)
- A • B • C • D • E • F • G • H • I • J • K • L • M • N • O • P–Q • R • S • T • U–V • W–X • Y–Z

The data was exported from mindat.org on 29 April 2005; updated up to 'IMA2021'.

The minerals are sorted by name, followed by the structural group (rruff.info/ima and ima-cnmnc by mineralienatlas.de, mainly) or chemical class (mindat.org and basics), the year of publication (if it's before of an IMA approval procedure), the IMA approval and the Strunz-mindat code. The first link is to mindat.org, the second link is to webmineral.com, and the third is to the Handbook of Mineralogy (Mineralogical Society of America).

- Abbreviations:
  - ^{D} – discredited (IMA/CNMNC status).
  - ^{Q} – questionable/ doubtful (IMA/CNMNC, mindat.org or mineralienatlas.de status).
  - ^{N} – published without approval of the IMA/CNMNC, or just not an IMA approved mineral but with some acceptance in the scientific community nowadays.
  - ^{I} – intermediate member of a solid-solution series.
  - ^{H} – hypothetical mineral (synthetic, anthropogenic, suspended approval procedure, etc.)
    - ^{ch} – incomplete description, hypothetical solid solution end member.
  - Rd – redefinition of ...
  - "s.p." – special procedure.
  - group – a name used to designate a group of species, sometimes only a mineral group name.
  - no – no link available.
  - IUPAC – chemical name.
  - Y: NNNN – year of publication.
  - Y: old – known before publications were available.

== C ==
=== Ca ===
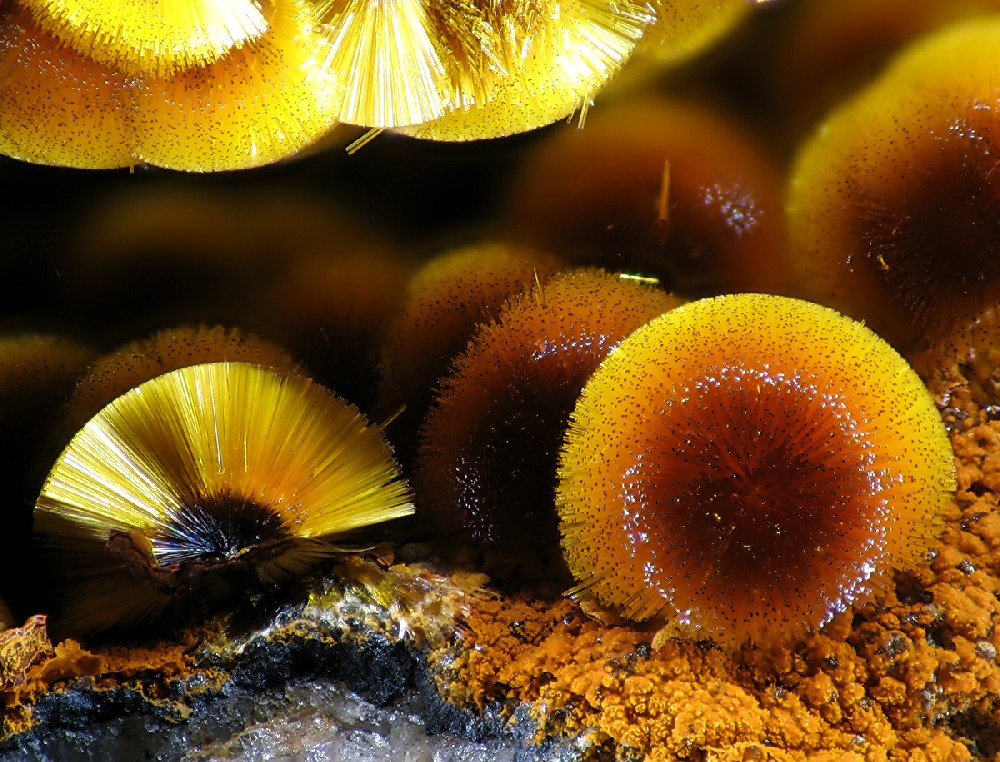
Cacoxenite, Minas de Horcajo, Castile-La Mancha, Spain

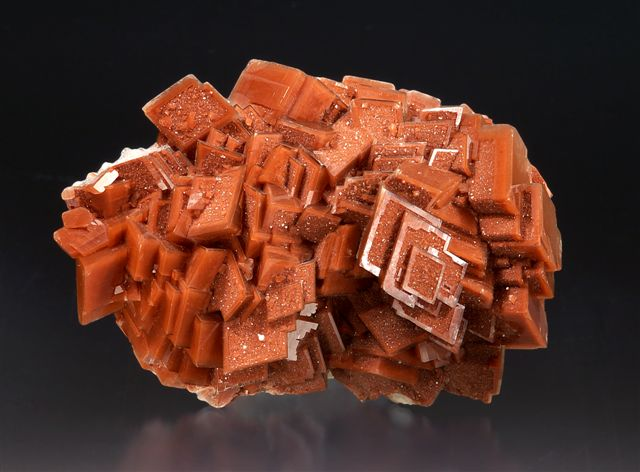
Calcite colored red by inclusions of hematite, 14 × 10 × 4 cm, Tsumeb, Namibia

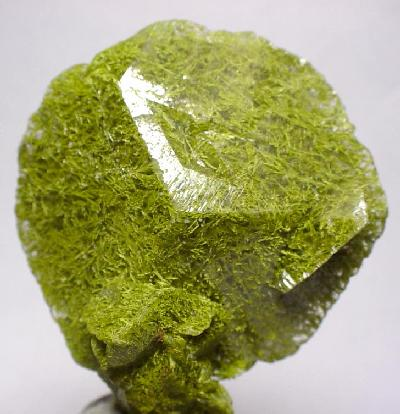
Clear calcite with dendritic mottramite, 5 × 4.5 × 3 cm, Tsumeb, Namibia

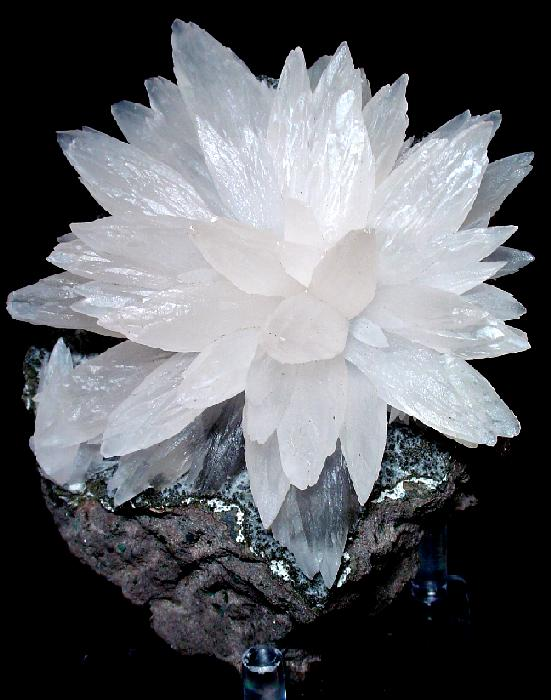
Calcite, 13.4 × 10.5 × 6.5 cm, Iraí, Rio Grande do Sul, Brazil

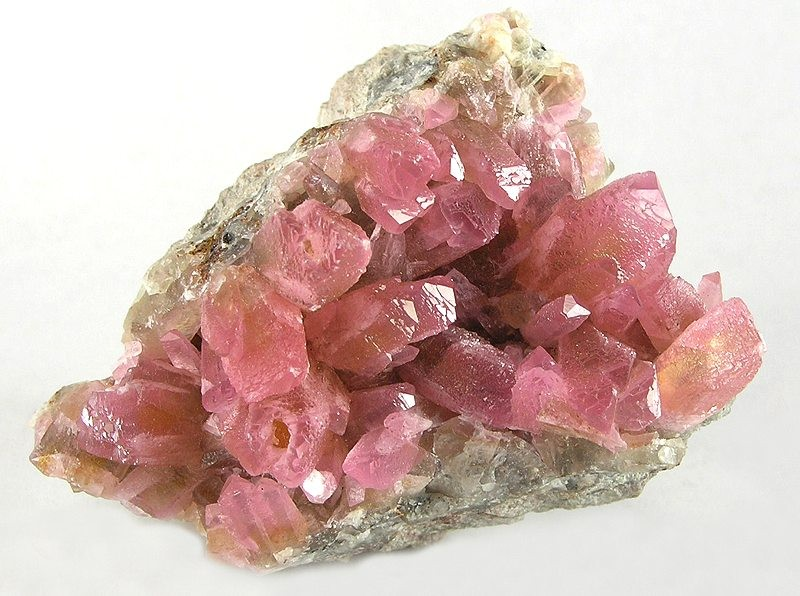
Cobaltoan calcite, Bou Azzer District, Tazenakht, Ouarzazate Province, Souss-Massa-Draâ Region, Morocco

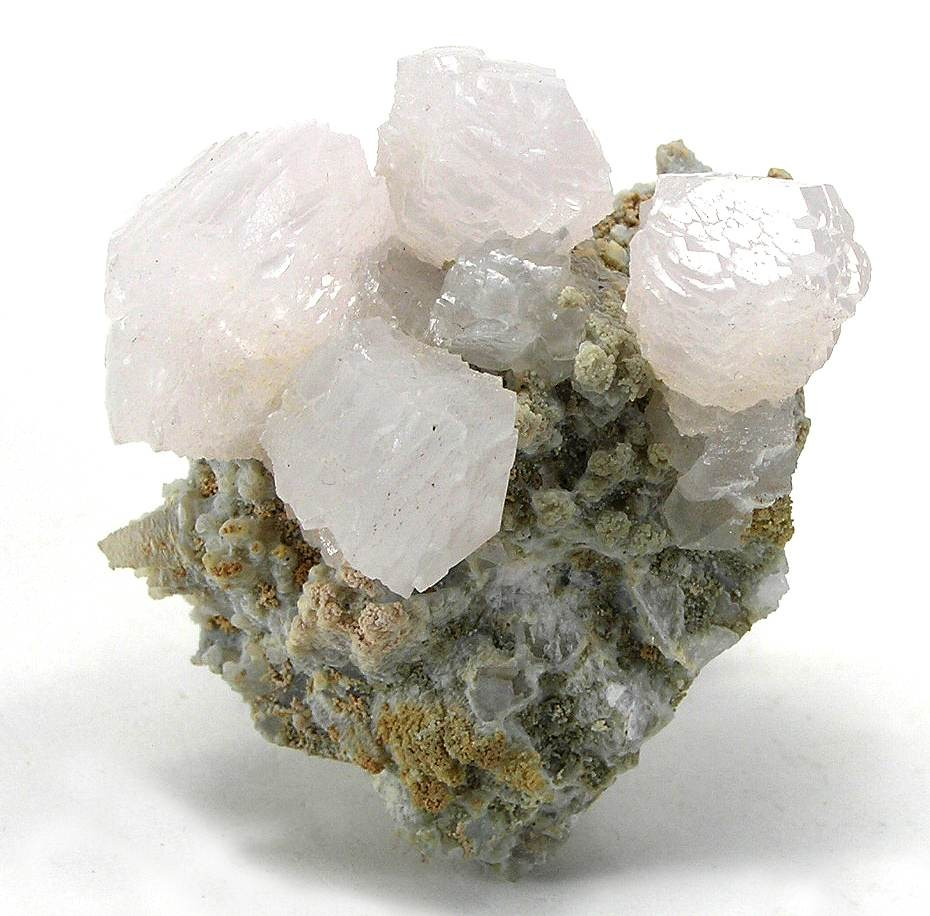
Manganoan calcite stepped crystals with a light pink blush from the manganese content, from Nikolaevskiy Mine, Primorskiy Kray, Far-Eastern Region, Russia

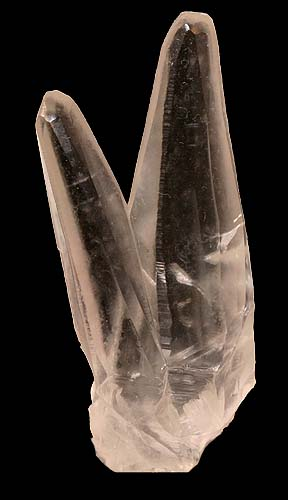
Twinned scalenohedral calcite, 4.5 × 2.0 × 1.3 cm, Rodeo (municipality), Durango, Mexico

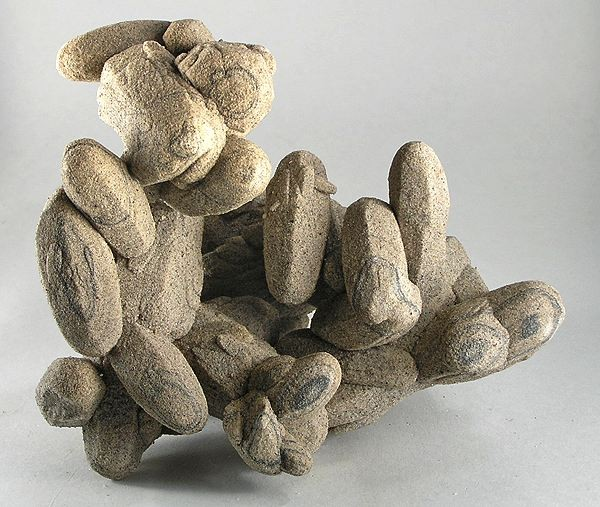
"Sand calcites" (calcites heavily included with desert sand) from Rattlesnake Butte, Jackson County, South Dakota, USA

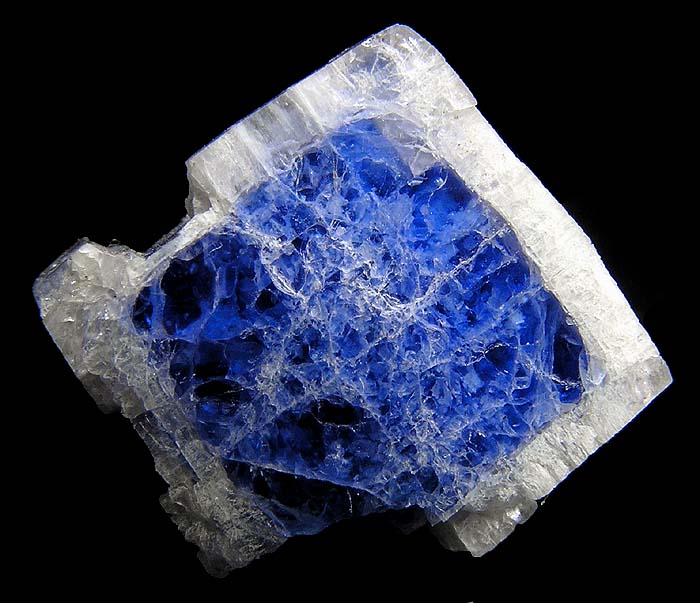
Carletonite, 1.6 × 1.6 × 0.9 cm, Poudrette quarry, Mont Saint-Hilaire, Montérégie, Quebec, Canada

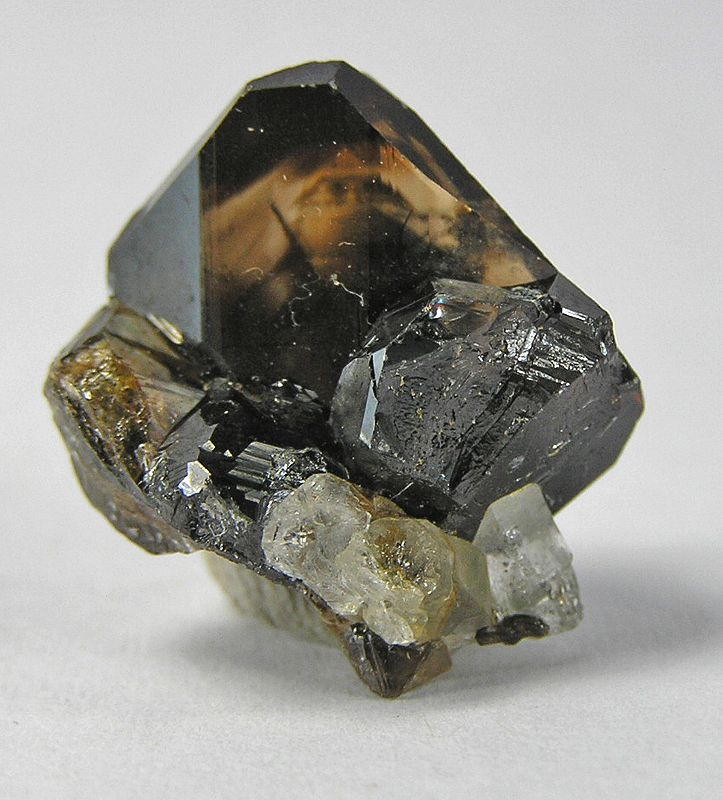
Cassiterite crystal

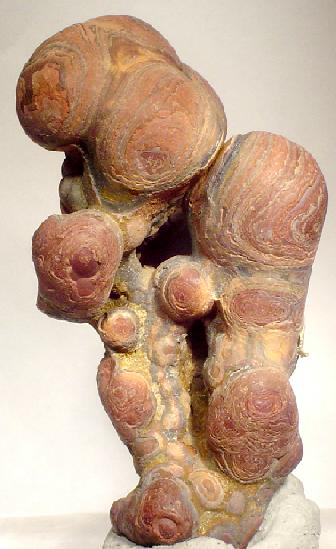
Stalactitic-botryoidal, banded, wood-tin cassiterite, 5.0 × 4.9 × 3.3 cm, Durango, Mexico

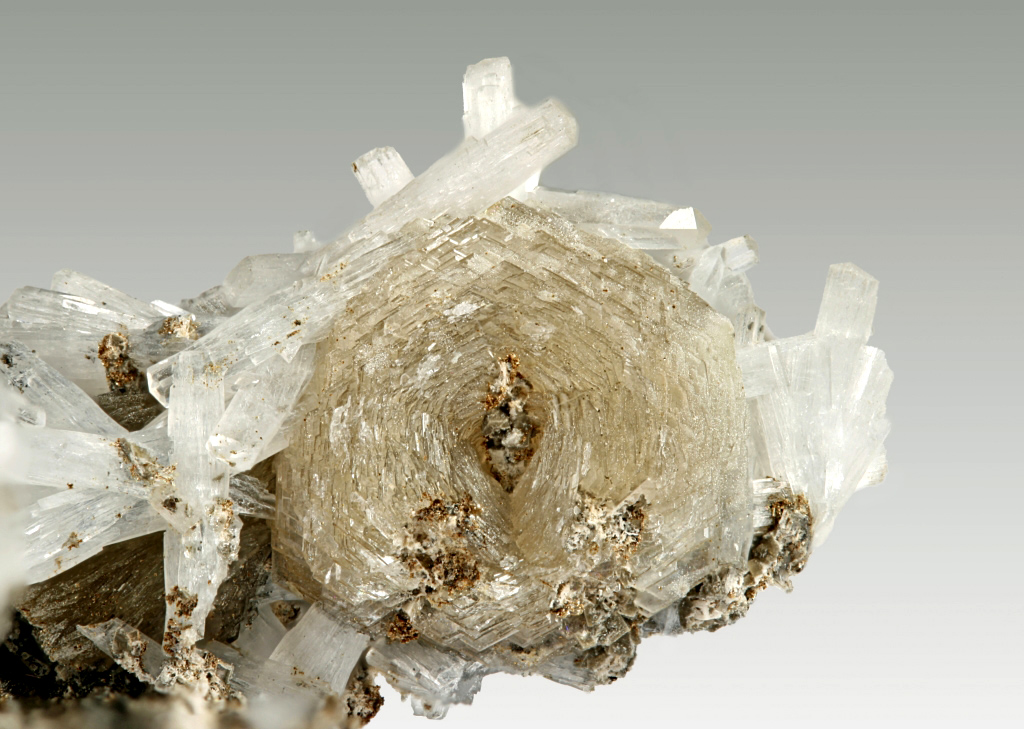
Catapleiite from Poudrette quarry, Mont Saint-Hilaire, La Vallée-du-Richelieu RCM, Montérégie, Québec, Canada

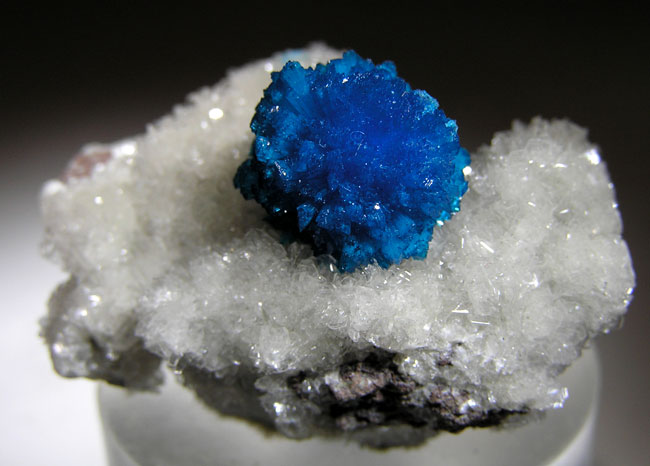
Cavansite ball on stilbite, 4 × 2.8 × 2.6 cm, Pune District, Maharashtra, India

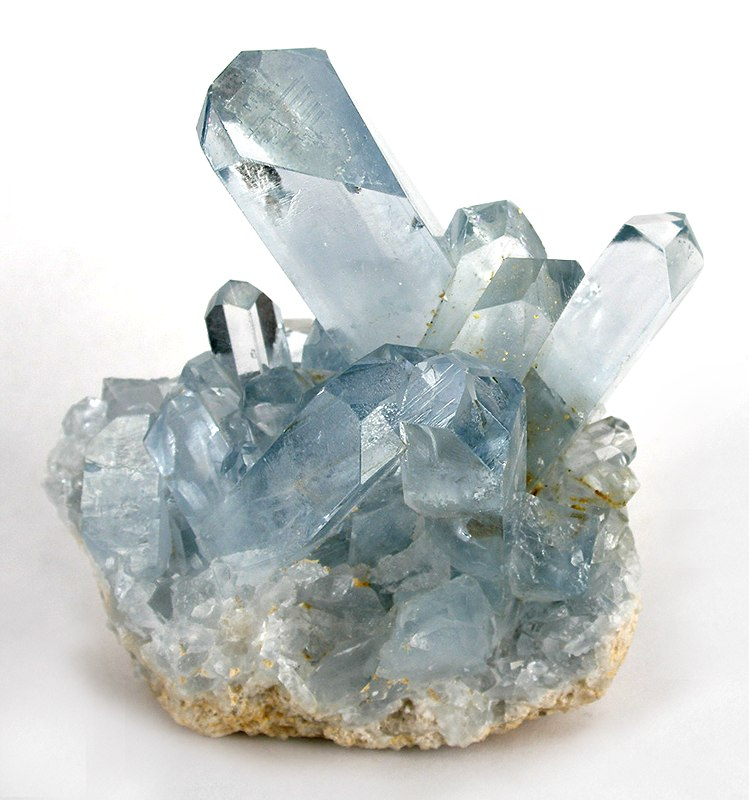
Sky blue, prismatic crystals of celestine

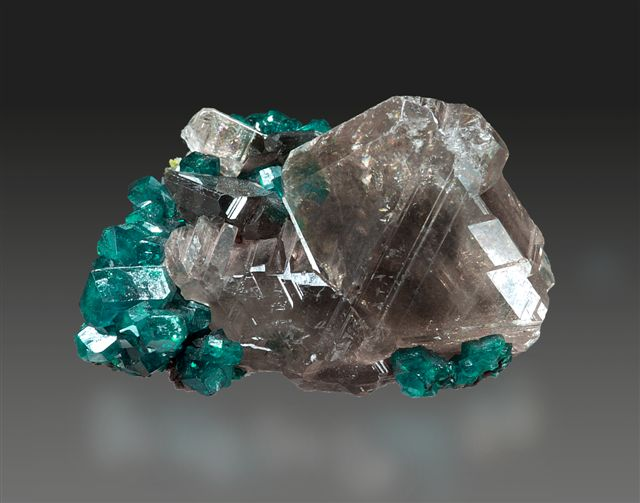
Cerussite and dioptase, 5 × 3.5 × 3.5 cm, Tsumeb, Namibia

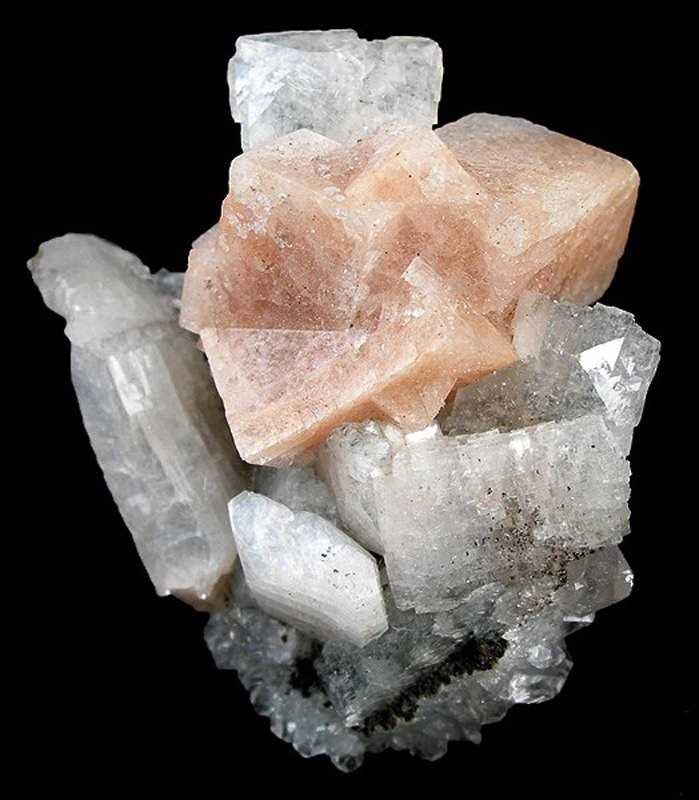
Pastel salmon-pink chabazite upon pearlescent heulandite crystals

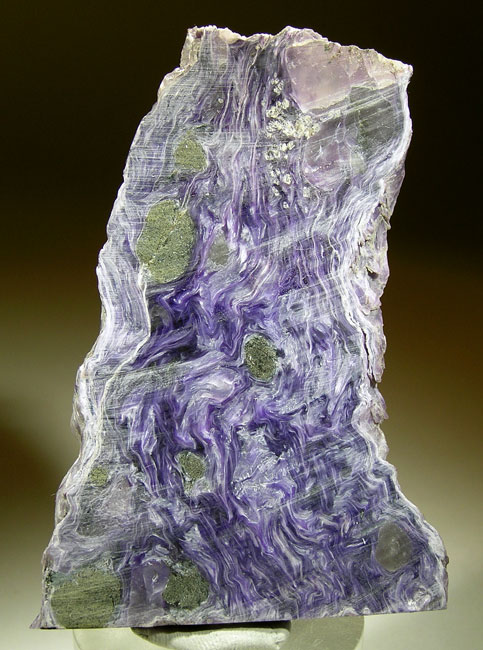
Charoite, 8 cm tall, Murunskii Massif, Chara River, Yakutia, Russia

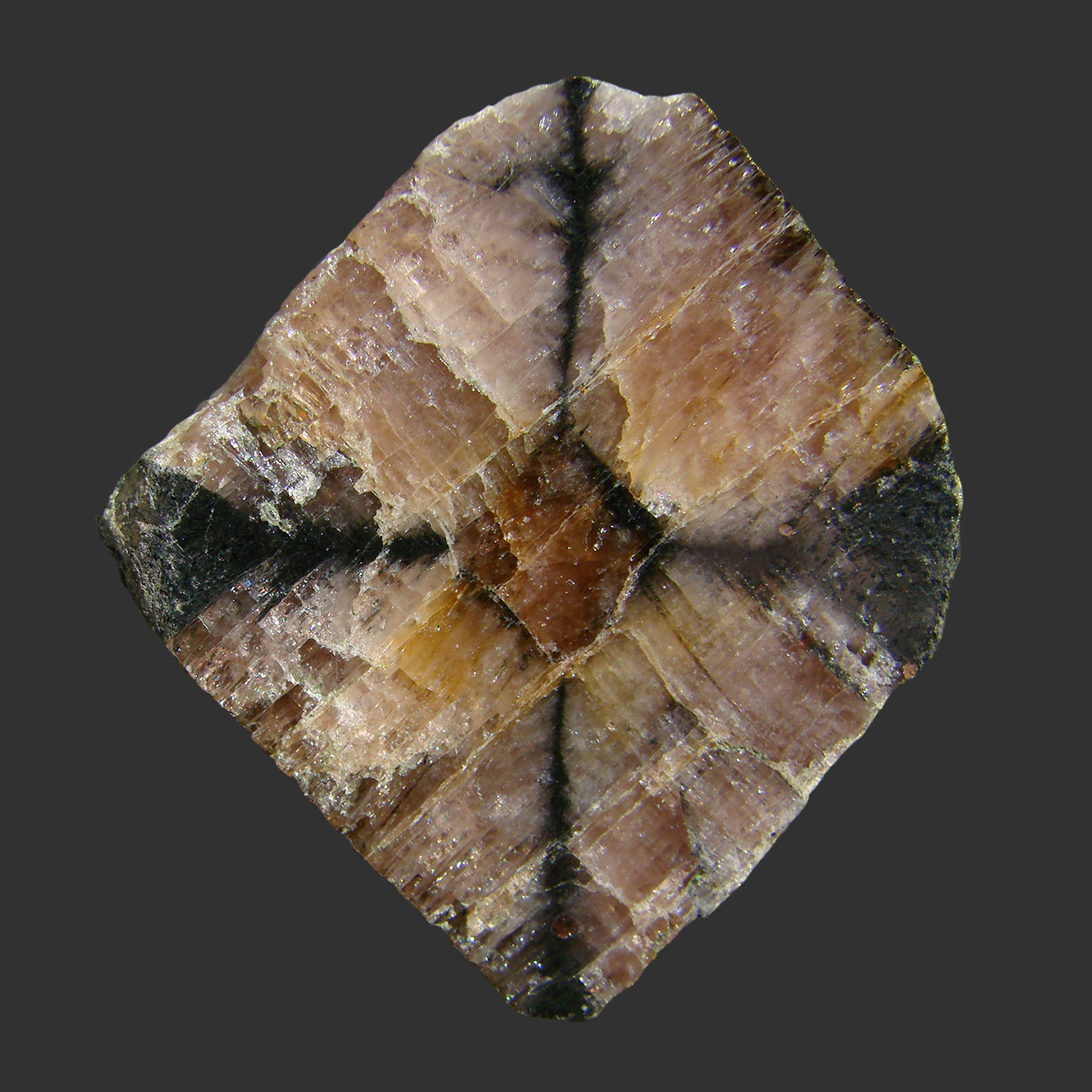
Chiastolite

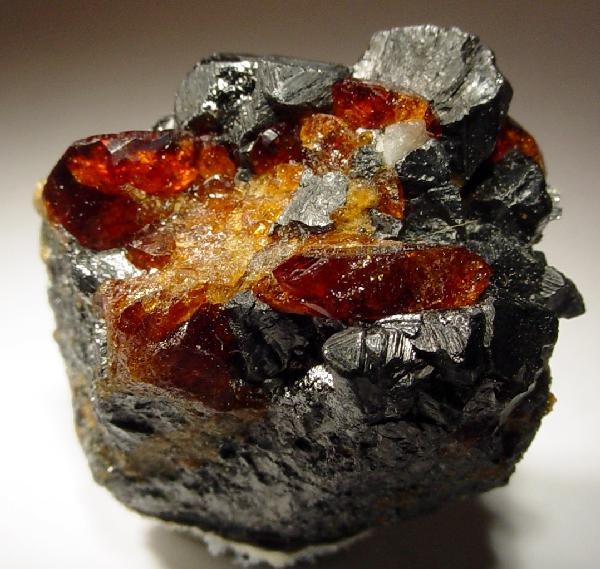
Gemmy red Chondrodite with magnetite, 2.8 × 2.6 × 2.1 cm, Tilly Foster mine, Brewster, New York, US

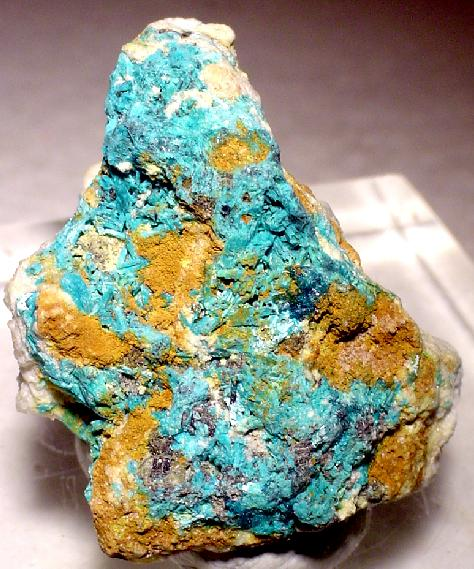
Christelite 3.2 × 2.8 × 2.0 cm, San Francisco Mine, Sierra Gorda District, Tocopilla Province, Antofagasta Region, Chile

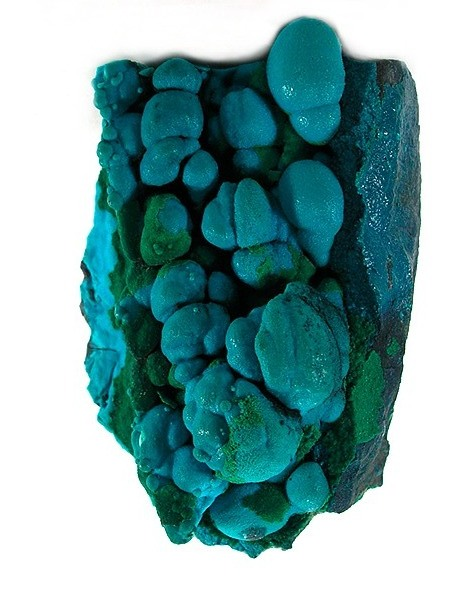
Chrysocolla and malachite, 7.5 × 4.5 × 3 cm, Mashamba West Mine, Kolwezi, Lualaba District, Democratic Republic of the Congo

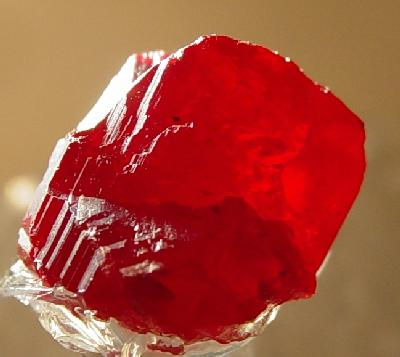
Cinnabar, 1 × .7 × 0.7 cm, Antelope Springs District, Pershing County, Nevada, US

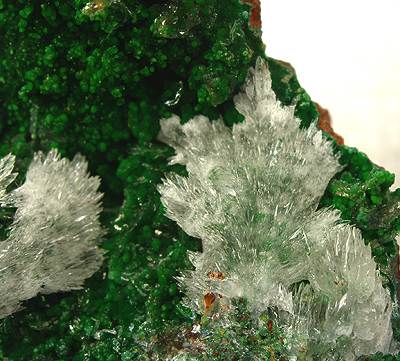
Conichalcite (dark green) and austinite, Gold Hill Mine, Tooele County, Utah

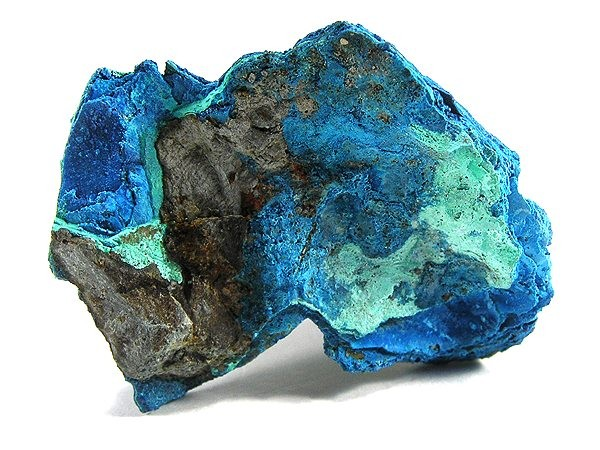
Connellite from Perran Great St George Mine, Perranzabuloe, St Agnes District, Cornwall, England

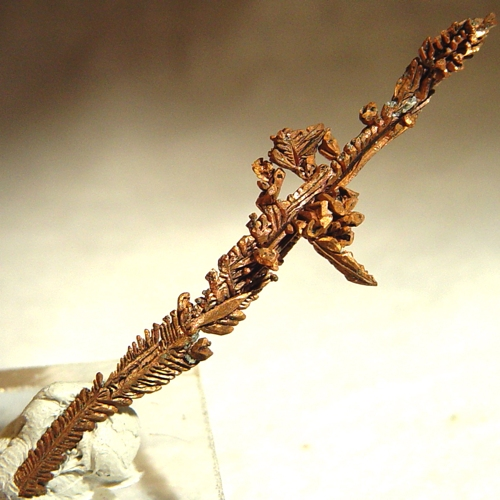
Copper crystal, 5.5 × 1.5 × 0.3 cm, Itauz Mine, Zhezqazghan Oblysy, Kazakhstan

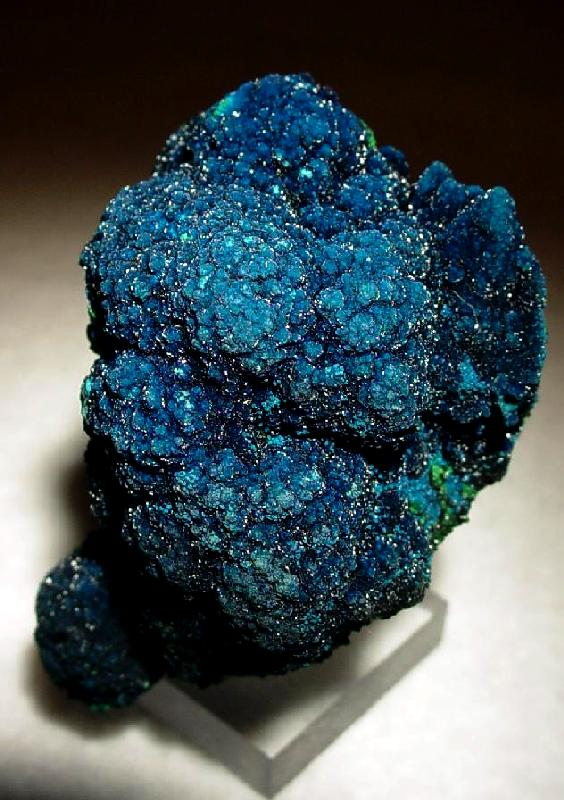
Cornetite, 5.7 × 3.9 × 3.9 cm, from the type locality, Star of the Congo Mine, Lubumbashi, Haut-Katanga District, Democratic Republic of the Congo

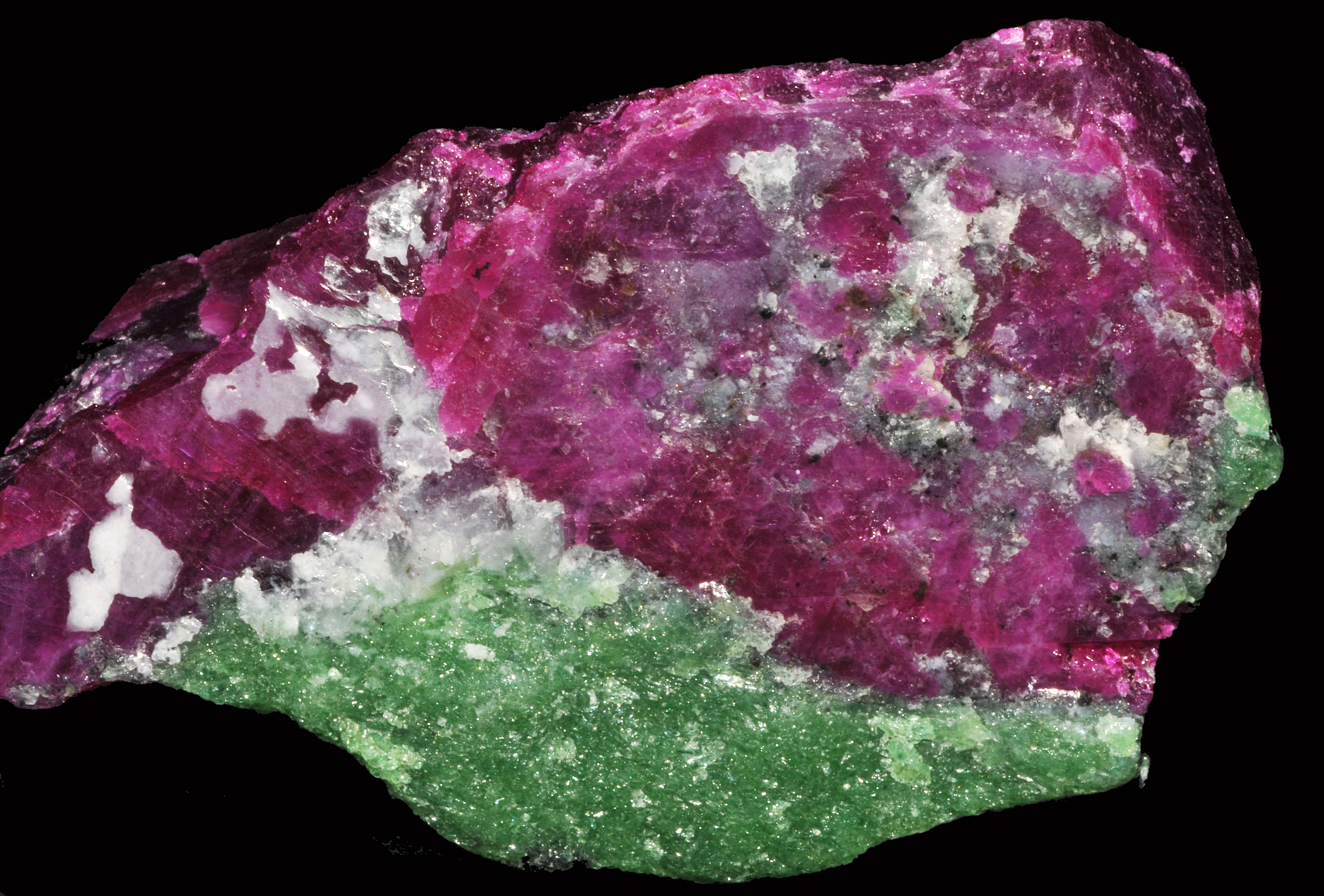
Crystals of corundum (var. ruby) and crystals of zoisite (var. anyolite), from Mundarara Mine, Longido, Mt Kilimanjaro, Kilimanjaro Region, Tanzania

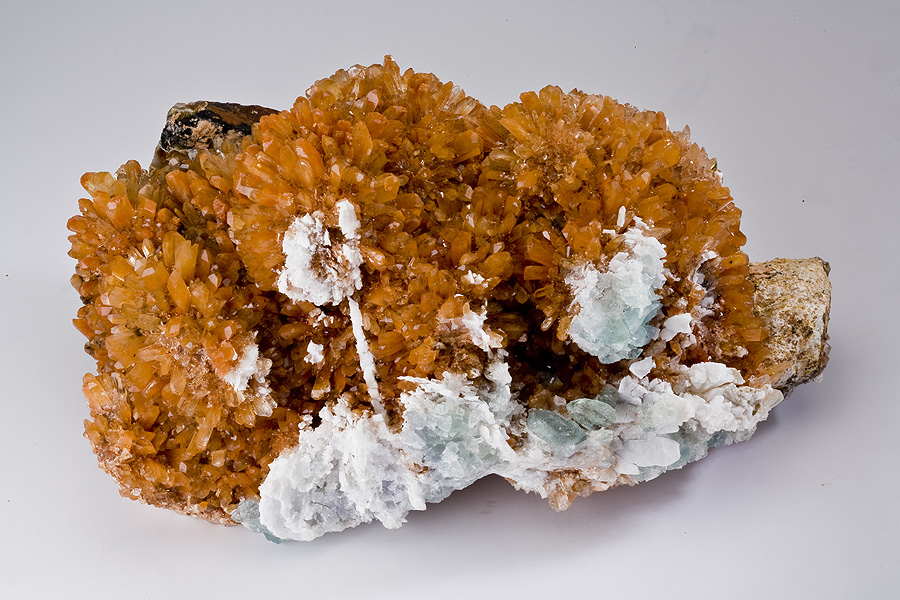
Creedite with gearksutite

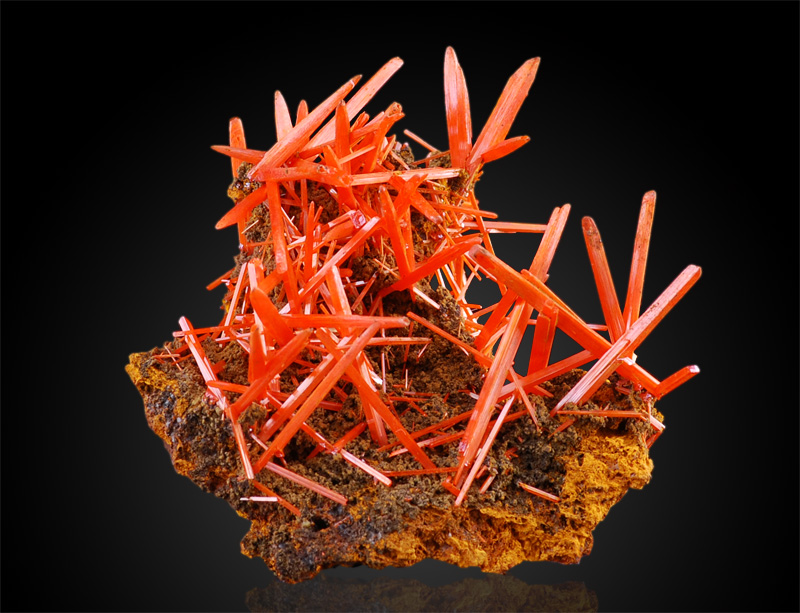
Crocoite, from the Adelaide Mine, Dundas mineral field, Zeehan District, Tasmania Australia

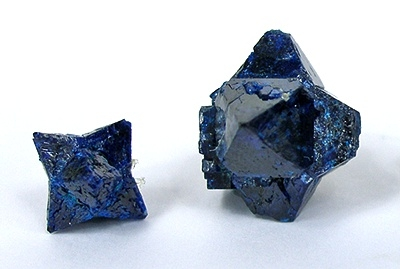
Cumengeite, Amelia Mine, Santa Rosalía, Baja California Sur, Mexico; larger specimen: 1.4 x 1.4 x 1.4 cm

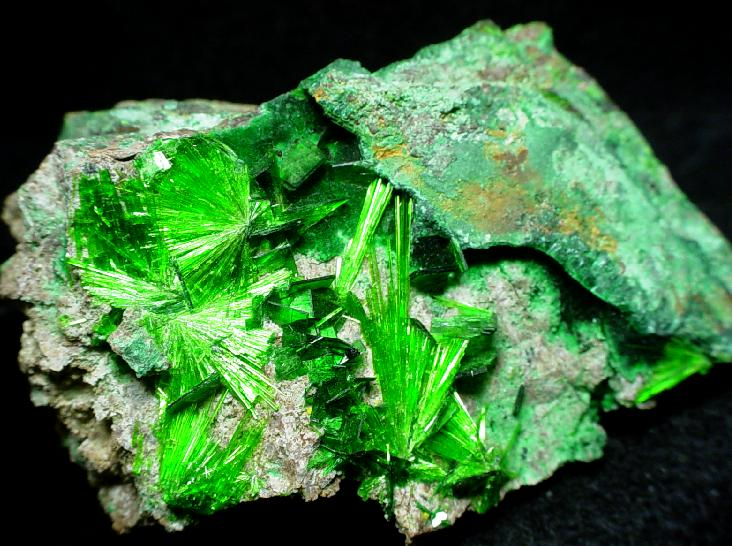
Acicular cuprosklodowskite and darker green, tabular metatorbernite, 6.5 × 4.5 × 4 cm, Kolwezi, Lualaba District, Democratic Republic of the Congo

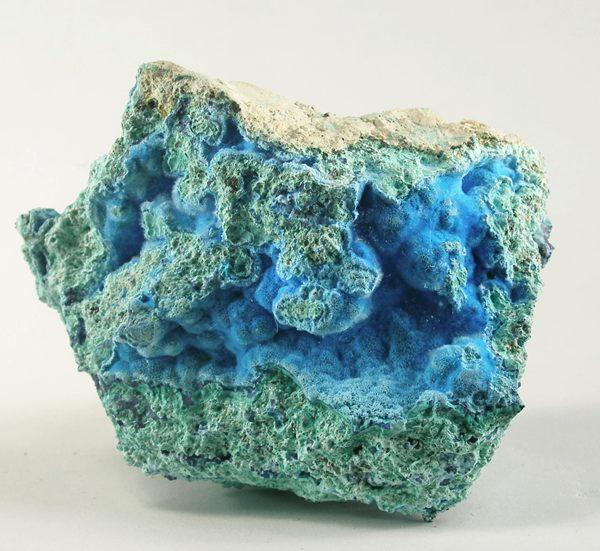
Powder-blue cyanotrichite needles lining vugs in green malachite matrix

1. Cabalzarite (tsumcorite: IMA1997-012) 8.CG.15 [no]
  (IUPAC: calcium dimagnesium diarsenate dihydrate)
2. Cabriite (alloy: IMA1981-057) 1.AG.30
  (IUPAC: dipalladium copper stannide)
3. Cabvinite (IMA2016-011) 3.D0. [no] [no]
  (IUPAC: dithorium hydro heptafluoride trihydrate)
4. Cacoxenite (Y: 1826) 8.DC.40
5. Cadmium (IMA1980-086a) 1.AB.05
6. Cadmoindite (spinel, linnaeite: IMA2003-042) 2.DA.05
  (IUPAC: cadmium diindium tetrasulfide)
7. Cadmoselite (wurtzite: 1957) 2.CB.45
  (IUPAC: cadmium selenide)
8. Cadwaladerite^{Q} (Y: 1941) 3.BD.05
9. Caesiumpharmacosiderite (pharmacosiderite: IMA2013-096) 8.CJ. [no] [no]
  (IUPAC: caesium tetrairon [tetrahydro triarsenate] tetrahydrate)
10. Cafarsite (IMA1965-036) 4.JC.05
11. Cafetite (IMA1962 s.p., 1959) 4.FL.75
  (IUPAC: calcium dititanium pentaoxide monohydrate)
12. Cahnite (zircon: 1927) 6.AC.70
  (IUPAC: dicalcium tetrahydro boro-arsenate)
13. Cairncrossite (gyrolite: IMA2013-012) 9.EE. [no] [no]
14. Calamaite (IMA2016-036) 7.0 [no] [no]
  (IUPAC: disodium titanium oxodisulfate dihydrate)
15. Calaverite (calaverite: 1868) 2.EA.10
  (IUPAC: gold ditelluride)
16. Calciborite (Y: 1956) 6.BC.10
  (IUPAC: calcium tetraoxo diborate)
17. Calcinaksite (litidionite: IMA2013-081) 9.D?. [no] [no]
  (IUPAC: potassium sodium calcium (decaoxo tetrasilicate) monohydrate)
18. Calcioancylite 5.DC.05
  1. Calcioancylite-(Ce) (ancylite: IMA1987 s.p., 1923) 5.DC.05
  2. Calcioancylite-(La) (ancylite: IMA2021-090) 5.DC.05
  3. Calcioancylite-(Nd) (ancylite: IMA1989-008) 5.DC.05
    (Nd_{2.8}Ca_{1.2}(CO_{3})_{4}(OH)_{3}·H_{2}O)
19. Calcioandyrobertsite (andyrobertsite: IMA1997-023) 8.DH.50 [no]
  (IUPAC: potassium calcium pentacopper tetrarsenate dihydroxoarsenate dihydrate)
20. Calcioaravaipaite (aravaipaite: IMA1994-018) 3.DC.37
  (IUPAC: lead dicalcium alumino-nonafluoride)
21. Calcioburbankite (burbankite: IMA1993-001) 5.AC.30
22. Calciocatapleiite (catapleiite: IMA2007 s.p., 1964) 9.CA.15
  (IUPAC: calcium zirconium nonaoxy trisilicate dihydrate)
23. Calciocopiapite (copiapite: IMA1967 s.p., 1960) 7.DB.35
  (IUPAC: calcium tetrairon(III) dihydro hexasulfate icosahydrate)
24. Calciodelrioite (delrioite: IMA2012-031) 4.HG. [no]
  (IUPAC: calcium di(vanadate(V)) tetrahydrate)
25. Calcioferrite (calcioferrite: 1858) 8.DH.25
  (IUPAC: tetracalcium magnesium tetrairon(III) tetrahydro hexaphosphate dodecahydrate)
26. Calciohatertite (alluaudite: IMA2021-013) [no] [no]
27. Calciohilairite (IMA1984-023) 9.DM.10
  (IUPAC: calcium zirconium nonaoxy trisilicate trihydrate)
28. Calciojohillerite (alluaudite: IMA2016-068) 8.0 [no] [no]
  (IUPAC: sodium calcium magnesium dimagnesium triarsenate)
29. Calciolangbeinite (langbeinite: IMA2011-067) 7.AD. [no]
  (IUPAC: dipotassium dicalcium trisulfate)
30. Calciomurmanite (seidozerite, murmanite: IMA2014-103) 9.B?. [no] [no]
31. Calcio-olivine (olivine: IMA2007-B) 9.AD.10 [no]
  (IUPAC: dicalcium (tetraoxysilicate))
32. Calciopetersite (mixite: IMA2001-004) 8.DL.15
  (IUPAC: calcium hexacopper hexahydro diphosphate hydroxophosphate trihydrate)
33. Calciosamarskite (samarskite: 1928) 4.DB.25 [no]
34. Calciotantite (IMA1981-039) 4.DJ.05
  (IUPAC: calcium tetratantalum undecaoxide)
35. Calciouranoite (wölsendorfite: IMA1973-004) 4.GB.20
36. Calcioursilite (ursilite: 1957) 9.AK.35 [no] [no]
37. Calcite (calcite: old/ 1836) 5.AB.05
  (IUPAC: calcium carbonate)
38. Calcjarlite (jarlite: 1970) 3.CC.20
39. Calclacite (Y: 1945) 10.AA.25
  (IUPAC: calcium chloro acetate pentahydrate)
40. Calcurmolite (IMA1988-xxx, 1959) 7.HB.15
41. Calcybeborosilite-(Y)^{Q} (gadolinite: 1963, 2000) 9.AJ.20 [no]
  Note: might be gadolinite-(Y)
42. Calderite (garnet, garnet: 1909) 9.AD.25
  (IUPAC: trimanganese(II) diiron(III) tri(tetraoxysilicate))
43. Calderónite (brackebuschite: IMA2001-022) 8.BG.05 [no]
  (IUPAC: dilead iron(III) hydro divanadate)
44. Caledonite (Y: 1832) 7.BC.50
  (IUPAC: dicopper pentalead hexahydro trisulfate carbonate)
45. Calkinsite-(Ce) (IMA1987 s.p., 1953) 5.CC.25
  (IUPAC: dicerium tricarbonate tetrahydrate)
46. Callaghanite (Y: 1954) 5.DA.25
  (IUPAC: dicopper dimagnesium hexahydro carbonate dihydrate)
47. Calomel (Y: old) 3.AA.30
  (IUPAC: (dimercury) dichloride)
48. Calumetite (anthonyite: IMA1967 s.p., 1963) 3.DA.40
  (IUPAC: calcium tetracopper octahydro dichloride (3.5)hydrate)
49. Calvertite (IMA2006-030) 2.CA.15
  (Cu_{5}Ge_{0.5}S_{4})
50. Calzirtite (IMA1967 s.p., 1961) 4.DL.10
  (IUPAC: dicalcium pentazirconium dititanium hexadecaoxide)
51. Camanchacaite (alluaudite: IMA2018-025) 8.0 [no] [no]
  (IUPAC: sodium vacancy calcium dimagnesium diarsenate dihydroxoarsenate)
52. Cámaraite (seidozerite, bafertisite: IMA2009-011) 9.B?. [no]
53. Camaronesite (taranakite: IMA2012-094) 8.0 [no] [no]
54. Camérolaite (cyanotrichite: IMA1990-036) 7.DE.75
  (Cu_{4}Al_{2}(HSbO_{4},SO_{4})(OH)_{10}CO_{3}·2H_{2}O)
55. Cameronite (IMA1984-069) 2.DB.35
56. Camgasite (IMA1988-031) 8.DJ.15
  (IUPAC: calcium magnesium hydro arsenate pentahydrate)
57. Caminite (IMA1983-015) 7.BB.05
  (IUPAC: heptamagnesium tetrahydro pentasulfate monohydrate)
58. Campigliaite (devilline: IMA1981-001) 7.DD.30
  (IUPAC: tetracopper manganese(II) hexahydro disulfate tetrahydrate)
59. Campostriniite (görgeyite: IMA2013-086a) 7.CD. [no] [no]
60. Canaphite (IMA1983-067) 8.FC.10
  (IUPAC: disodium calcium pyrophosphate tetrahydrate)
61. Canasite (IMA1962 s.p., 1959) 9.DG.80
  (K_{3}Na_{3}Ca_{5}Si_{12}O_{30}(OH)_{4})
62. Canavesite (IMA1977-025) 6.H0.50
  (IUPAC: dimagnesium hydroxoborate carbonate pentahydrate)
63. Cancrinite (cancrinite: 1833) 9.FB.05
64. Cancrisilite (cancrinite: IMA1990-013) 9.FB.05
65. Canfieldite (argyrodite: 1894) 2.BA.70
  (IUPAC: octasilver hexasulfa stannide)
66. Cannizzarite (Y: 1924) 2.JB.20
  (IUPAC: octalead tricosasulfa decabismuthide)
67. Cannonite (IMA1992-002) 7.BD.35
  (IUPAC: dibismuth dihydro oxosulfate)
68. Canosioite (brackebuschite: IMA2015-030) 8.BG. [no] [no]
  (IUPAC: dibarium iron(III) hydro diarsenate)
69. Canutite (alluaudite: IMA2013-070) 8.0 [no] [no]
  (IUPAC: sodium vacancy trimanganese arsenate di(hydroxoarsenate))
70. Caoxite (oxalate: IMA1996-012) 10.AB.50
  (IUPAC: calcium oxalate trihydrate)
71. Capgaronnite (IMA1990-011) 2.FC.20a
  (IUPAC: silver mercury chloro sulfide)
72. Cappelenite-(Y) (IMA1987 s.p., 1884) 9.AJ.30
  (BaY_{6}B_{6}Si_{3}O_{24}F_{2})
73. Capranicaite (IMA2009-086) 9.DB.50 [no]
  (KCaNaAl_{4}B_{4}Si_{2}O_{18})
74. Caracolite (apatite: 1886) 7.BD.20
  (IUPAC: disodium (dilead sodium) chloro trisulfate)
75. Carboborite (IMA1967 s.p., 1964) 6.AC.50
  (IUPAC: dicalcium magnesium di(tetrahydro borate) dicarbonate tetrahydrate)
76. Carbobystrite (cancrinite: IMA2009-028) 9.FB.05 [no]
77. Carbocalumite (hydrotalcite: IMA2021-106) 4.FL. [no] [no]
78. Carbocernaite (carbocernaite: IMA1967 s.p., 1961) 5.AB.50
79. Carboirite (IMA1980-066) 9.J0.05 [no]
  (IUPAC: iron(II) dialuminium germanium pentaoxo dihydroxy)
80. Carbokentbrooksite (eudialyte: IMA2002-056) 9.CO.10 [no]
81. Carbonatecyanotrichite (cyanotrichite: IMA1967 s.p., 1963) 7.DE.10
  (IUPAC: tetracopper dialuminium dodecahydro carbonate dihydrate)
82. Cardite (IMA2015-125) 8.0 [no] [no]
  (IUPAC: (5.5)zinc diarsenate trihydro hydroxoarsenate trihydrate)
83. Carducciite (IMA2013-006) 2.HB. [no] [no]
84. Caresite (hydrotalcite: IMA1992-030) 5.DA.40
  (IUPAC: tetrairon(II) dialuminium dodecahydro carbonate trihydrate)
85. Carletonite (carletonite: IMA1969-016) 9.EB.20
86. Carletonmooreite (silicide: IMA2018-068) 1.0 [no] [no]
  (IUPAC: trinickel silicide)
87. Carlfrancisite (hematolite: IMA2012-033) 8.BE.45 [no] [no]
88. Carlfriesite (IMA1973-013) 4.JK.25
  (IUPAC: calcium ditellurium(IV) tellurium(VI) octaoxide)
89. Carlgieseckeite-(Nd) (apatite: IMA2010-036) 8.BN.05 [no]
  (IUPAC: sodium niobium tricalcium fluoro triphosphate)
90. Carlhintzeite (IMA1978-031) 3.CB.45
  (IUPAC: dicalcium heptafluoroaluminate monohydrate)
91. Carlinite (IMA1974-062) 2.BD.25
  (IUPAC: dithallium sulfide)
92. Carlosbarbosaite (IMA2010-047) 4.0 [no]
  (IUPAC: diuranyl diniobium hexaoxo dihydroxy dihydrate)
93. Carlosruizite (IMA1993-020) 7.DG.40
  (IUPAC: tripotassium pentasodium pentamagnesium hexaiodate hexaselenate hexahydrate)
94. Carlosturanite (IMA1984-009) 9.DJ.25
95. Carlsbergite (nitride, rocksalt: IMA1971-026) 1.BC.15
  (IUPAC: chromium nitride)
96. Carlsonite (metavoltine: IMA2014-067) 7.0 [no] [no]
  (IUPAC: pentammonium triiron(III) oxohexasulfate heptahydrate)
97. Carmeltazite (IMA2018-103) 4.0 [no] [no]
  (IUPAC: zirconium dialuminium tetratitanium undecaoxide)
98. Carmichaelite (IMA1996-062) 4.DB.50
99. Carminite (carminite: 1850) 8.BH.30
  (IUPAC: lead diiron(III) dihydro diarsenate)
100. Carnallite (carnallite: 1856) 3.BA.10
  (IUPAC: potassium magnesium trichloride hexahydrate)
101. Carnotite (Y: 1899) 4.HB.05
  (IUPAC: dipotassium diuranyl divanadate trihydrate)
102. Carobbiite (halite, rocksalt: 1956) 3.AA.20
  (IUPAC: potassium fluoride)
103. Carpathite (IMA1971 s.p., 1955) 10.BA.30
  (IUPAC: coronene, a polycyclic aromatic hydrocarbon (PAH))
104. Carpholite (carpholite: 1817) 9.DB.05
  (IUPAC: manganese(II) dialuminium hexaoxy disilicate tetrahydroxyl)
105. Carraraite (ettringite: IMA1998-002) 7.DG.15
  (IUPAC: tricalcium germanium hexahydro sulfate carbonate dodecahydrate)
106. Carrboydite^{Q} (hydrotalcite: IMA1974-033) 7.DD.35
107. Carrollite (spinel, linnaeite: 1852) 2.DA.05
  (IUPAC: copper dicobalt tetrasulfide)
108. Caryinite (alluaudite: IMA1980 s.p., 1874) 8.AC.10
  (IUPAC: sodium calcium calcium dimanganese triarsenate)
109. Caryochroite (IMA2005-031) 9.HA.65 [no]
110. Caryopilite (serpentine: IMA1967 s.p., 1889) 9.ED.15
111. Cascandite (pectolite: IMA1980-011) 9.DG.07
112. Caseyite (IMA2019-002) 4.0 [no] [no]
113. Cassagnaite (ardennite: IMA2006-019a) 9.BJ.65
114. Cassedanneite (IMA1984-063) 7.FC.20
  (IUPAC: pentalead divanadate dichromate monohydrate)
115. Cassidyite (fairfiedite: IMA1966-024) 8.CG.05
  (IUPAC: dicalcium nickel diphosphate dihydrate)
116. Cassiterite (rutile: 1832) 4.DB.05
  (IUPAC: tin dioxide)
117. Castellaroite (IMA2015-071) 8.CD. [no] [no]
  (IUPAC: trimanganese(III) diarsenate (4.5)hydrate)
118. Caswellsilverite (IMA1981-012a) 2.FB.05
  (IUPAC: sodium chromium sulfide)
119. Catalanoite (IMA2002-008) 8.CJ.70 [no]
  (IUPAC: disodium hydroxophosphate octahydrate)
120. Catamarcaite (IMA2003-020) 2.CB.35b [no]
  (IUPAC: hexacopper germanium tungsten octasulfide)
121. Catapleiite (catapleiite: 1850) 9.CA.15
  (IUPAC: disodium zirconium nonaoxytrisilicate dihydrate)
122. Cattierite (pyrite: 1945) 2.EB.05a
  (IUPAC: cobalt disulfide)
123. Cattiite (IMA2000-032) 8.CE.50 [no]
  (IUPAC: trimagnesium diphosphate docosahydrate)
124. Cavansite (IMA1967-019) 9.EA.50
  (Ca(VO)(Si_{4}O_{10})·4H_{2}O)
125. Cavoite (IMA2001-024) 4.HE.40
  (IUPAC: calcium trivanadium heptaoxide)
126. Cayalsite-(Y) (IMA2011-094) 9.0 [no]
127. Caysichite-(Y) (IMA1973-044) 9.DJ.15

=== Ce – Ch ===
1. Cebaite 5.BD.15
  (IUPAC: tribarium diREE difluoro pentacarbonate)
  1. Cebaite-(Ce) (IMA1987 s.p., 1983) 5.BD.15
  2. Cebaite-(Nd)^{N} (Y: 2000) 5.BD.15 [no]
2. Cebollite^{Q} (Y: 1914) 9.BB.10
  Note: incomplete description.
3. Čechite (IMA1980-068) 8.BH.40
  (IUPAC: lead iron(II) hydro vanadate)
4. Čejkaite (IMA1999-045) 5.ED.50 [no]
  (IUPAC: tetrasodium uranyl tricarbonate)
5. Celadonite (mica: IMA1998 s.p., 1847) 9.EC.15
6. Celestine (IMA1967 s.p., 1791) 7.AD.35
  (IUPAC: strontium sulfate)
7. Celleriite (tourmaline: IMA2019-089) 9.CK. [no] [no]
8. Celsian (Y: 1895) 9.FA.30
9. Centennialite (IMA2013-110) 3.DA. [no] [no]
10. Cerchiaraite 9.CF.25
  1. Cerchiaraite-(Al) (cerchiaraite: IMA2012-011) 9.CF.25 [no] [no]
  2. Cerchiaraite-(Fe) (cerchiaraite: IMA2012-012) 9.CF.25 [no] [no]
  3. Cerchiaraite-(Mn) (cerchiaraite: IMA1999-012) 9.CF.25 [no]
11. Cerianite-(Ce) (IMA1987 s.p., 1955) 4.DL.05
  (IUPAC: cerium dioxide)
12. Cerite-(Ce) (cerite: IMA1987 s.p., 1804) 9.AG.20
13. Cerium^{Q} (Y: 2002) 1.0 [no] [no]
14. Černýite (stannite: IMA1976-057) 2.CB.15a
  (IUPAC: dicopper cadmium tin tetrasulfide)
15. Cerromojonite (IMA2018-040) 2.0 [no] [no]
16. Ceruléite (IMA2007 s.p., 1900) 8.DE.25
  (IUPAC: dicopper heptaluminium tridecahydro tetrarsenate (11.5)hydrate)
17. Cerussite (Y: 1565) 5.AB.15
  (IUPAC: lead carbonate)
18. Cervandonite-(Ce) (IMA1986-044) 9.BE.92
19. Cervantite (cervantite: IMA1962 s.p., 1850 Rd) 4.DE.30
  (IUPAC: antimony(III) antimony(V) tetraoxide)
20. Cervelleite (IMA1986-018) 2.BA.60
  (IUPAC: tetrasilver telluride sulfide)
21. Cesanite (apatite: IMA1980-023) 7.BD.20
  (IUPAC: dicalcium trisodium hydro trisulfate)
22. Césarferreiraite (laueite, laueite: IMA2012-099) 8.DC. [no] [no]
  (IUPAC: iron(II) diiron(III) diarsenate octahydrate)
23. Cesàrolite (Y: 1920) 4.FG.10
  (IUPAC: lead dihydro trimanganese(IV) hexaoxide)
24. Cesbronite (tellurium oxysalt: IMA2017-C, IMA1974-006) 4.JN.15
  (IUPAC: tricopper tellurium(VI) tetrahydro tetraoxide)
25. Cesiodymite (IMA2016-002) 7.0 [no] [no]
  (IUPAC: caesium potassium pentacopper oxopentasulfate)
26. Cesiokenopyrochlore (pyrochlore: IMA2016-104) 4.DH. [no] [no]
27. Cesplumtantite (IMA1985-040) 4.DM.15
  (IUPAC: dicaesium trilead octatantalum tetracosaoxide)
28. Cetineite (IMA1986-019) 2.MA.05
  (NaK_{5}Sb_{14}S_{6}O_{18}·6H_{2}O)
29. Chabazite 9.GD.10
  (chain of 6-membered rings – tabular zeolite)
  1. Chabazite-Ca (zeolitic tectosilicate: IMA1997 s.p., 1792) 9.GD.10
    (Ca[Al_{2}Si_{4}O_{12}]_{2}·12H_{2}O)
  2. Chabazite-K (zeolitic tectosilicate: IMA1997 s.p., 1997) 9.GD.10 [no]
    (K_{2}Ca[Al_{2}Si_{4}O_{12}]_{2}·12H_{2}O)
  3. Chabazite-Mg (zeolitic tectosilicate: IMA2009-060) 9.GD.10? [no] [no]
    (KMg[Al_{3}Si_{9}O_{24}]·10H_{2}O)
  4. Chabazite-Na (zeolitic tectosilicate: IMA1997 s.p.) 9.GD.10 [no]
    (Na_{2}Ca[Al_{2}Si_{4}O_{12}]_{2}·12H_{2}O)
  5. Chabazite-Sr (zeolitic tectosilicate: IMA1999-040) 9.GD.10 [no]
    (Sr_{2}[Al_{2}Si_{4}O_{12}]_{2}·12H_{2}O)
30. Chabournéite (chabournéite: IMA1976-042) 2.HC.05e
  (Tl_{4}Pb_{2}(Sb,As)_{20}S_{34})
31. Chadwickite (IMA1997-005) 4.JA.60 [no]
  (IUPAC: uranyl hydrogenarsenite)
32. Chaidamuite (IMA1985-011) 7.DC.30
  (IUPAC: zinc iron(III) hydro disulfate tetrahydrate)
33. Chalcanthite (Y: 1853) 7.CB.20
  (IUPAC: copper sulfate pentahydrate)
34. (Chalcedony: a cryptocrystalline form of silica, composed of very fine intergrowths of quartz and moganite)
35. Chalcoalumite (Y: 1925) 7.DD.75
  (IUPAC: copper tetraluminium dodecahydro sulfate trihydrate)
36. Chalcocite (Y: old/ 1751) 2.BA.05
  (IUPAC: dicopper sulfide)
37. Chalcocyanite (Y: 1873) 7.AB.10
  (IUPAC: copper sulfate)
38. Chalcomenite (Y: 1881) 4.JH.05
  (IUPAC: copper selenite(IV) dihydrate)
39. Chalconatronite (Y: 1955) 5.CB.40
  (IUPAC: disodium copper dicarbonate trihydrate)
40. Chalcophanite (Y: 1875) 4.FL.20
  (IUPAC: zinc trimanganese(IV) heptaoxide trihydrate)
41. Chalcophyllite (Y: 1801) 8.DF.30
  (Cu_{18}A_{l2}(AsO_{4})_{4}(SO_{4})_{3}(OH)_{24}·36H_{2}O)
42. Chalcopyrite (chalcopyrite: 1725?) 2.CB.10a
  (IUPAC: copper(I) iron(III) disulfide)
43. Chalcosiderite (Y: 1814) 8.DD.15
  (IUPAC: copper hexairon(III) octahydro tetraphosphate tetrahydrate)
44. Chalcostibite (chalcostibite: 1835) 2.HA.05
  (IUPAC: copper antimonide disulfide)
45. Chalcothallite (IMA1966-008) 2.BD.40
46. Challacolloite (IMA2004-028) 3.AA.55
  (IUPAC: potassium dilead pentachloride)
47. Chambersite (IMA1967 s.p., 1962) 6.GA.05
  (Mn^{2+}_{3}B_{7}O_{13}Cl, tecto-heptaborate)
48. Chaméanite (IMA1980-088) 2.LA.35
  ((Cu,Fe)_{4}As(Se,S)_{4})
49. Chamosite (chlorite: 1820) 9.EC.55
50. Chanabayaite (triazolate: IMA2013-065) 10.0 [no] [no]
51. Changesite-(Y) (cerite: IMA2022-023)
52. Changbaiite (Y: 1978) 4.DF.10
  (IUPAC: lead diniobium hexaoxide)
53. Changchengite (IMA1995-047) 2.EB.25
  (IUPAC: iridium bismuthide sulfide)
54. Changoite (IMA1997-041) 7.CC.50
  (IUPAC: disodium zinc disulfate tetrahydrate)
55. Chantalite (IMA1977-001) 9.AG.55
56. Chaoite (IMA1968-019) 1.CB.05b
57. Chapmanite (IMA1968 s.p., 1924) 9.ED.25
58. Charleshatchettite (IMA2015-048) 4.0 [no] [no]
59. Charlesite (ettringite: IMA1981-043) 7.DG.15
60. Charmarite (hydrotalcite: IMA1992-026) 5.DA.40
  (IUPAC: tetramanganese dialuminium dodecahydro carbonate trihydrate)
61. Charoite (IMA1977-019) 9.DG.92
62. Chatkalite (IMA1981-004) 2.CB.20
  (IUPAC: hexacopper iron ditin octasulfide)
63. Chayesite (milarite: IMA1987-059) 9.CM.05
64. Chegemite (IMA2008-038) 9.AF.
  (IUPAC: heptacalcium tritetraoxysilicate trihydroxyl)
65. Chekhovichite (IMA1986-039) 4.JK.35
  (IUPAC: dibismuth(III) tetratellurium(IV) undecaoxide)
66. Chelkarite (Y: 1968) 6.H0.05
67. Chenevixite (Y: 1866) 8.DD.05
68. Chengdeite (auricupride: IMA1994-023) 1.AG.35
  (IUPAC: triiridium iron alloy)
69. Chenguodaite (IMA2004-042a) 2.BA.60 [no]
  (IUPAC: nonasilver iron ditelluride tetrasulfide)
70. Chenite (IMA1983-069) 7.BC.70
  (IUPAC: copper tetralead hexahydro disulfate)
71. Chenmingite (IMA2017-036) 4.BB. [no] [no]
72. Cheralite (IMA2005-F, 1953) 8.AD.50
  (IUPAC: calcium thorium diphosphate)
73. Cheremnykhite (vanadate-tellurium oxysalt: IMA1989-017) 8.DL.20
  (IUPAC: trilead trizinc tellurium hexaoxo divanadate)
74. Cherepanovite (modderite: IMA1984-041) 2.CC.15
  (IUPAC: rhenium arsenide)
75. Chernikovite (IMA1988 s.p., IMA1985-M) 8.EB.15
76. Chernovite-(Y) (zircon: IMA1967-027) 8.AD.35
  (IUPAC: yttrium arsenate)
77. Chernykhite (mica: IMA1972-006) 9.EC.15
  (BaV^{3+}_{2}(Si_{2}A_{l2})O_{10}(OH)_{2})
78. Chervetite (IMA1967 s.p., 1963) 8.FA.15
  (IUPAC: dilead divanadium(V) heptaoxide)
79. Chesnokovite (IMA2006-007) 9.AC.20
  (IUPAC: disodium (dioxysilicate dihydroxyl) octahydrate)
80. Chessexite (IMA1981-054) 7.DG.35
  (Na_{4}Ca_{2}Mg_{3}Al_{8}(SiO_{4})_{2}(SO_{4})_{10}(OH)_{10}·40H_{2}O)
81. Chesterite (IMA1977-010) 9.DF.05
  (Mg_{17}Si_{20}O_{54}(OH)_{6})
82. Chestermanite (orthopinakiolite: IMA1986-058) 6.AB.40
83. Chevkinite-(Ce) (chevkinite: IMA1987 s.p., 1842) 9.BE.70
84. Chiappinoite-(Y) (IMA2014-040) 9.0 [no] [no]
  (IUPAC: diyttrium manganese tetra(heptaoxy trisilicate))
85. Chiavennite (zeolitic tectosilicate: IMA1981-038) 9.GF.25
  (CaMn^{2+}(BeOH)_{2}Si_{5}O_{13}·2H_{2}O)
86. Chibaite (IMA2008-067) 10.0 [no] [no]
87. Chihmingite (IMA2022-010)
88. Chihuahuaite (magnetoplumbite: IMA2009-027 Rn) 04.CC.45 [no] [no]
89. Childrenite (Y: 1823) 8.DD.20
  (IUPAC: iron(II) aluminium dihydro phosphate monohydrate)
90. Chiluite (IMA1988-001) 7.BD.55
91. Chinleite 7.0
  1. Chinleite-(Nd) (IMA2022-051)
  2. Chinleite-(Y) (IMA2016-017) 7.0 [no] [no]
    (IUPAC: sodium yttrium disulfate monohydrate)
92. Chiolite (Y: 1846) 3.CE.05
93. Chiyokoite (ettringite: IMA2019-054) 6.0 [no] [no]
94. Chirvinskyite (IMA2016-051) 9.B?. [no] [no]
95. Chistyakovaite (IMA2005-003) 8.EB.20
  (IUPAC: aluminium diuranyl (fluoro,hydro) diarsenate (6.5)hydrate)
96. Chivruaiite (IMA2004-052) 9.DG.45 [no]
97. Chkalovite (Y: 1939) 9.DM.20
98. Chladniite (IMA1993-010) 8.AC.50
  (IUPAC: disodium calcium heptamagnesium hexaphosphate)
99. Chloraluminite (Y: 1872) 3.BC.05
  (IUPAC: aluminium trichloride hexahydrate)
100. Chlorapatite (apatite: IMA2010 s.p., 1860) 8.BN.05
  (IUPAC: pentacalcium chloro triphosphate)
101. Chlorargyrite (IMA1962 s.p., 1902) 3.AA.15
  (IUPAC: silver(I) chloride)
102. Chlorartinite (IMA1996-005) 5.DA.10
  (IUPAC: dimagnesium chloro hydro carbonate (2.5)hydrate)
103. Chlorbartonite (IMA2000-048) 2.FC.10 [no]
  (IUPAC: hexapotassium tetracosairon chloro hexacosasulfide)
104. Chlorellestadite (apatite: IMA2017-013, IMA2010 s.p., IMA2008 s.p., IMA1981-B) 9.AH.25
105. Chloritoid (Y: 1832) 9.AF.85
  (IUPAC: iron(II) dialuminium oxy tetraoxysilicate dihydroxyl)
106. Chlorkyuygenite (IMA2013-C, IMA2012-046 Rn) 4.0 [no] [no]
107. Chlormagaluminite (hydrotalcite: IMA1980-098) 5.DA.45
  (IUPAC: tetramagnesium dialuminium dichloro dodecahydroxide diwater)
108. Chlormanganokalite (Y: 1906) 3.CJ.05
  (IUPAC: tetrapotassium manganese hexachloride)
109. Chlormayenite (IMA2013-C, IMA1963-016) 4.CC.20
  (IUPAC: dodecacalcium tetradecaluminium dichloro ditricontaoxide)
110. Chlorocalcite (Y: 1872) 3.AA.40
  (IUPAC: potassium calcium trichloride)
111. Chloromagnesite^{Q} (Y: 1873) 3.AB.20 [no] [no]
  (IUPAC: magnesium dichloride)
112. Chloromenite (IMA1996-048) 4.JG.10
  (IUPAC: nonacopper hexachloro dioxo tetraselenite(IV))
113. Chlorophoenicite (Y: 1924) 8.BE.35
114. Chlorothionite (Y: 1872) 7.BC.25
  (IUPAC: dipotassium copper dichloro sulfate)
115. Chloroxiphite (Y: 1923) 3.DB.30
  (IUPAC: trilead copper dihydro dioxy dichloride)
116. Choloalite (IMA1980-019) 4.JK.45
117. Chondrodite (Y: 1817) 9.AF.45
118. Chongite (IMA2015-039) 8.0 [no] [no]
  (IUPAC: tricalcium dimagnesium diarsenate dihydroxoarsenate tetrahydrate)
119. Chopinite (olivine: IMA2006-004) 8.AB.15 [no]
  (IUPAC: trimagnesium diphosphate)
120. Chovanite (IMA2009-055) 2.JB.35e [no]
121. Chrisstanleyite (chrisstanleyite: IMA1996-044) 2.BC.15
  (IUPAC: disilver tripalladium tetraselenide)
122. Christelite (IMA1995-030) 7.DD.25
  (IUPAC: trizinc dicopper hexahydro disulfate tetrahydrate)
123. Christite (IMA1976-015) 2.HD.15
  (IUPAC: thallium mercury arsenide trisulfide)
124. Christofschäferite-(Ce) (chevkinite: IMA2011-107) 9.B?. [no]
125. Chromatite (zircon: IMA1967 s.p., 1963) 7.FA.10
  (IUPAC: calcium chromate (VI))
126. Chrombismite (IMA1995-044) 4.CC.05
  (IUPAC: hexadecabismuth chromium heptacosaoxide)
127. Chromceladonite (mica: IMA1999-024) 9.EC.15 [no]
128. Chromferide (alloy: IMA1984-021) 1.AE.15
  (Fe_{1.5}Cr_{0.2})
129. Chromio-pargasite [Ca-amphibole: IMA2012 s.p., ehimeite (IMA2011-023)] 9.DE.15 [no]
130. Chromite (spinel, spinel: 1845) 4.BB.05
  (IUPAC: iron(II) chromate)
131. Chromium (iron: IMA1980-094) 1.AE.05
132. Chromium-dravite (tourmaline: IMA1982-055) 9.CK.05
133. Chromo-alumino-povondraite (tourmaline: IMA2013-089 with new type material, ~~IMA2009-088~~ D) 9.CK.05 [no] [no]
134. Chromphyllite (IMA1995-052) 9.EC.15 [no]
135. Chromschieffelinite (lead-tellurium oxysalt: IMA2011-003) 7.DF. [no]
136. Chrysoberyl (olivine: 1789) 4.BA.05
  (IUPAC: beryllium dialuminium tetraoxide)
137. Chrysocolla (a mineral) (a mineraloid) (IMA1980 s.p., 315 BC) 9.ED.20
138. Chrysothallite (IMA2013-008) 3.0 [no] [no]
  (IUPAC: hexapotassium hexacopper thallium(III) tetrahydro heptadecachloride monohydrate)
139. Chrysotile (IMA2007 s.p., 1834 Rd) 9.ED.15 [no]
140. Chubarovite (IMA2014-018) 6.0 [no] [no]
  (IUPAC: potassium dizinc dichloro borate)
141. Chukochenite (IMA2018-132a) 4.0 [no] [no]
  (IUPAC: lithium octaoxo pentaaluminate)
142. Chukotkaite (IMA2019-124) 2.0 [no] [no]
  (AgPb_{7}Sb_{5}S_{15})
143. Chudobaite (IMA1962 s.p.) 8.CE.05
  (IUPAC: pentamagnesium diarsenate di(hydroxoarsenate) decahydrate)
144. Chukanovite (malachite: IMA2005-039) 5.BA.10
  (IUPAC: diiron dihydro carbonate)
145. Chukhrovite 3.CG.10
  1. Chukhrovite-(Ca) (IMA2010-081) 3.CG.10 [no]
  2. Chukhrovite-(Ce) (IMA1987 s.p., 1979) 3.CG.10
  3. Chukhrovite-(Nb) (IMA2004-023) 3.CG.10 [no]
  4. Chukhrovite-(Y) (IMA1987 s.p., 1960) 3.CG.10
146. Churchite-(Y) (IMA1987 s.p., 1865) 8.CJ.50
  (IUPAC: yttrium phosphate dihydrate)
147. Chursinite (IMA1982-047a) 8.AD.60
  (IUPAC: [dimercury] dimercury(II) diarsenate)
148. Chvaleticeite (IMA1984-059) 7.CB.25
  (IUPAC: manganese sulfate hexahydrate)
149. Chvilevaite (IMA1987-017) 2.FB.10
  (Na(Cu,Fe,Zn)_{2}S_{2})

=== Ci – Co ===
1. Cianciulliite (IMA1990-042) 4.FL.55
  (IUPAC: dimagnesium manganese(II) dizinc decahydroxide (2–4)hydrate)
2. Cinnabar (Theophrastus, 315 BC) 2.CD.15a
  (IUPAC: mercury sulfide)
3. Ciprianiite (hellandite: IMA2001-021) 9.DK.20 [no]
  (Ca_{4}ThCeAlSi_{4}B_{4}O_{22}(OH)_{2})
4. Ciriottiite (madocite: IMA2015-027) 2.0 [no] [no]
5. Cirrolite^{Q} (Y: 1868) 8.BH.20 [no] [no]
  (IUPAC: tricalcium dialuminium trihydro triphosphate)
6. Clairite (IMA1982-093) 7.DF.55
  (IUPAC: diammonium triiron(III) trihydro tetrasulfate trihydrate)
7. Claraite (IMA1981-023) 5.DA.30
  (IUPAC: tricopper(II) tetrahydro carbonate tetrahydrate)
8. Claringbullite (IMA2015-L, IMA1976-029 Rd) 3.DA.15
  (IUPAC: tetracopper(II) heptahydroxide chloride)
9. Clarkeite (Y: 1931) 4.GC.05
  (IUPAC: sodium uranyl oxyhydroxide (n)hydrate)
10. Claudetite (claudetite: 1868) 4.CB.45
  (IUPAC: diarsenic trioxide)
11. Clausthalite (galena, rocksalt: 1832) 2.CD.10
  (IUPAC: lead selenide)
12. Clearcreekite (IMA1999-003) 5.DC.30
  (IUPAC: tri[dimercury] dihydro dicarbonate tetrahydrate)
13. Clerite (berthierite: IMA1995-029) 2.HA.20
  (IUPAC: manganese diantimonide tetrasulfide)
14. Cleusonite (crichtonite: IMA1998-070) 4.CC.40
15. Cliffordite (uranyl tellurite: IMA1966-046) 4.JK.75
  (IUPAC: uranyl tritellurium(IV) nonaoxide)
16. Clinoatacamite (atacamite: IMA1993-060) 3.DA.10b
  (IUPAC: dicopper trihydroxide chloride)
17. Clinobehoite (IMA1988-024) 4.FA.05b
  (IUPAC: beryllium dihydroxide)
18. Clinobisvanite (IMA1973-040) 8.AD.65
  (IUPAC: bismuth vanadate)
19. Clinocervantite (clinocervantite: IMA1997-017) 4.DE.30 [no]
  (IUPAC: antimony(III) antimony(V) tetraoxide)
20. Clinochalcomenite^{N} (Y: 1981) 4.JH.10
  (IUPAC: copper selenite dihydrate)
21. Clinochlore (chlorite: 1851) 9.EC.55
22. Clinoclase (Y: 1830) 8.BE.20
  (IUPAC: tricopper trihydro arsenate)
23. Clinoenstatite (pyroxene: IMA1988 s.p., 1906) 9.DA.10
  (IUPAC: dimagnesium hexaoxy disilicate)
24. Clino-ferri-holmquistite [Li-amphibole: IMA2014 s.p., ferri-ottoliniite (IMA2001-067)] 9.DE. [no]
25. Clino-ferro-ferri-holmquistite [Li-amphibole: IMA2012 s.p., ferri-clinoferroholmquistite (IMA2001-066)] 9.DE.25 [no]
26. Clinoferrosilite (pyroxene: IMA1988 s.p., 1935) 9.DA.10
  (IUPAC: diiron(II) hexaoxy disilicate)
27. Clinohedrite (Y: 1866) 9.AE.30
  (IUPAC: calcium zinc tetraoxysilicate monohydrate)
28. Clinohumite (humite: 1876) 9.AF.55
  (IUPAC: nonamagnesium tetra(tetraoxysilicate) difluoride)
29. Clinojimthompsonite (IMA1977-012) 9.DF.05
  (Mg_{5}Si_{6}O_{16}(OH)_{2})
30. Clinokurchatovite (IMA1982-017) 6.BA.10
  (calcium magnesium pentaoxo diborate)
31. Clinometaborite (IMA2010-022) 6.0 [no]
  (IUPAC: oxoborinic acid)
32. Clino-oscarkempffite (lillianite: IMA2012-086) 2.0 [no] [no]
33. Clinophosinaite (IMA1979-083) 9.CF.15
  (IUPAC: trisodium calcium trioxysilicate phosphate)
34. Clinoptilolite 9.GE.05
  (zeolite family, chain of T_{10}O_{20} tetrahedra)
  1. Clinoptilolite-Ca (zeolitic tectosilicate: IMA1997 s.p., 1977) 9.GE.05 [no]
    (Ca_{3}(Si_{30}Al_{6}O_{72})·20H_{2}O)
  2. Clinoptilolite-K (zeolitic tectosilicate: IMA1997 s.p., 1923) 9.GE.05 [no]
    (K_{6}(Si_{30}Al_{6}O_{72})·20H_{2}O)
  3. Clinoptilolite-Na (zeolitic tectosilicate: IMA1997 s.p., 1969) 9.GE.05
    (Na_{6}(Si_{30}Al_{6}O_{72})·20H_{2}O)
35. Clinosafflorite (löllingite: IMA1970-014) 2.EB.15a
  (IUPAC: cobalt diarsenide)
36. Clino-suenoite [Mg-Fe-Mn-amphibole: IMA2016-111] 9.DE. [no] [no]
37. Clinotobermorite (tobermorite: IMA1990-005) 9.DG.10
  (Ca_{5}Si_{6}O_{17}(H_{2}O)_{2}·(Ca·3H_{2}O))
38. Clinoungemachite^{Q} (Y: 1938) 7.DG.10
  (IUPAC: tripotassium octasodium iron(III) dihydro hexasulfate decahydrate)
39. Clinozoisite (epidote, clinozoisite: IMA2006 s.p., 1896) 9.BG.05a
  (IUPAC: dicalcium trialuminium (heptaoxodisilicate) (tetraoxysilicate) oxyhydroxyl)
40. Clintonite (mica: IMA1998 s.p., 1843) 9.EC.35
41. Cloncurryite (IMA2005-060) 8.DC.60 [no]
42. Coalingite (hydrotalcite: IMA1965-011) 5.DA.55
  (IUPAC: decamagnesium diiron(III) tetracosahydro carbonate dihydrate)
43. Cobaltarthurite (arthurite: IMA2001-052) 8.DC.15 [no]
  (IUPAC: cobalt diiron(III) dihydro diarsenate tetrahydrate)
44. Cobaltaustinite (adelite: IMA1987-042) 8.BH.35
  (IUPAC: calcium cobalt hydro arsenate)
45. Cobaltite (cobaltite: 1797) 2.EB.25
  (IUPAC: cobalt sulfa arsenide)
46. Cobaltkieserite (kieserite: IMA2002-004) 7.CB.05 [no]
  (IUPAC: cobalt sulfate monohydrate)
47. Cobaltkoritnigite (koritnigite: IMA1980-013) 8.CB.20
  (IUPAC: cobalt hydroxoarsenate monohydrate)
48. Cobaltlotharmeyerite (tsumcorite: IMA1997-027) 8.CG.15 [no]
  (IUPAC: calcium dicobalt diarsenate dihydrate)
49. Cobaltneustädtelite (IMA2000-012) 8.BK.10 [no]
  (Bi_{2}Fe^{3+}(Co,Fe^{3+})(AsO_{4})_{2}(O,OH)_{4})
50. Cobaltoblödite (blödite: IMA2012-059) 7.CC. [no] [no]
  (IUPAC: disodium cobalt disulfate tetrahydrate)
51. Cobaltomenite (cobaltomenite: IMA2007 s.p., 1882) 4.JH.10
  (IUPAC: cobalt selenite(IV) dihydrate)
52. Cobaltpentlandite (pentlandite: IMA1962 s.p., 1959) 2.BB.15
  (IUPAC: nonacobalt octasulfide)
53. Cobalttsumcorite (tsumcorite: IMA1999-029) 8.CG.15 [no]
  (IUPAC: lead dicobalt diarsenate dihydrate)
54. Cobaltzippeite (IMA1971-006) 7.EC.05
  (IUPAC: cobalt diuranyl dioxo sulfate (3.5)hydrate)
55. Coccinite (Y: 1845) 3.AB.10 [no]
  (IUPAC: mercury iodide)
56. Cochromite (spinel, spinel: IMA1978-049) 4.BB.05
  (IUPAC: cobalt dichromium tetraoxide)
57. Coconinoite (IMA1965-003) 8.EB.35
  (IUPAC: diiron(III) dialuminium diuranyl dihydro tetraphosphate sulfate icosahydrate)
58. Coesite (IMA1962 s.p., 1954) 4.DA.35
  (IUPAC: dioxysilicate)
59. Coffinite (zircon: 1955) 9.AD.30
  (IUPAC: uranium tetraoxysilicate (n)hydrate)
60. Cohenite (perovskite: 1889) 1.BA.05
  (IUPAC: triiron carbide)
61. Coiraite (IMA2005-024) 2.HF.25b [no]
62. Coldwellite (IMA2014-045) 2.BC. [no] [no]
  (IUPAC: tripalladium disilver sulfide)
63. Colemanite (Y: 1883) 6.CB.10
64. Colimaite (IMA2007-045) 2.FB.25 [no]
  (IUPAC: tripotassium vanadium tetrasulfide)
65. Colinowensite (IMA2012-060) 9.0 [no] [no]
66. Collinsite (fairfieldite: 1927) 8.CG.05
  (IUPAC: dicalcium magnesium diphosphate dihydrate)
67. Colomeraite (pyroxene: IMA2021-061) [no] [no] [no]
68. Coloradoite (sphalerite: 1878) 2.CB.05a
  (IUPAC: mercury telluride)
69. Colquiriite (IMA1980-015) 3.CB.20
  (calcium lithium hexafluoroaluminate)
70. Columbite 4.DB.35
  (IUPAC: metal diniobium hexaoxide)
  1. Columbite-(Fe) (columbite: IMA2007 s.p., 1805) 4.DB.35
  2. Columbite-(Mg) (columbite: IMA1967 s.p., 1963) 4.DB.35
  3. Columbite-(Mn) (columbite: IMA2007 s.p., 1892) 4.DB.35
71. Colusite (germanite: 1914) 2.CB.30
  (IUPAC: dodecacopper vanadium arsenide hexadecasulfide)
72. Comancheite (IMA2013-B, IMA1980-077 Rd) 3.DD.65
  (Hg^{2+}_{55}N^{3−}_{24}(NH_{2},OH)_{4}(Cl,Br)_{34})
73. Combeite (lovozerite, zirsinalite–lovozerite: 1957) 9.CJ.15a
  (Na_{4.5}Ca_{3.5}Si_{6}O_{17.5}(OH)_{0.5})
74. Comblainite (hydrotalcite: IMA1978-009) 5.DA.50
  (IUPAC: hexanickel dicobalt(III) hexadecahydro carbonate tetrahydrate)
75. Compreignacite (compreignacite: IMA1964-026) 4.GB.05
  (IUPAC: dipotassium hexauranyl hexahydro tetraoxide heptahydrate)
76. Congolite (boracite: IMA1971-030) 6.GA.10
  (Fe^{2+}_{3}B_{7}O_{13}Cl)
77. Conichalcite (adelite: 1849) 8.BH.35
  (IUPAC: calcium copper hydro arsenate)
78. Connellite (connellite: 1847) 3.DA.25
  (Cu_{36}(SO_{4})(OH)_{62}Cl_{8}·6H_{2}O)
79. Cookeite (chlorite: 1866) 9.EC.55
80. Coombsite (IMA1989-058) 9.EG.35
81. Cooperite (Y: 1928) 2.CC.35b
  (IUPAC: platinum sulfide)
82. Coparsite (IMA1996-064) 8.BE.80
  (IUPAC: tetracopper(II) chloro dioxo arsenate)
83. Copiapite (Y: 1833) 7.DB.35
  (IUPAC: iron(II) tetrairon(III) dihydro hexasulfate icosahydrate)
84. Copper (element: old) 1.AA.05
85. Coquandite (IMA1991-024) 7.DE.35
86. Coquimbite (Y: 1841) 7.CB.55
  (IUPAC: diiron(III) trisulfate nonahydrate)
87. Coralloite (arthurite: IMA2010-012) 8.DC.20 [no] [no]
  (IUPAC: manganese(II) dimanganese(III) dihydro diarsenate tetrahydrate)
88. Corderoite (IMA1973-037) 2.FC.15a
  (IUPAC: trimercury dichloro disulfide)
89. Cordierite (beryl: 1813) 9.CJ.10
  (IUPAC: dimagnesium trialuminium octadecaoxy alumo pentasilicate)
90. Cordylite (cordylite) 5.BD.05
  1. Cordylite-(Ce) (IMA2000-C, IMA1987 s.p., 1901) 5.BD.05
    (IUPAC: sodium barium dicerium fluoro tetracarbonate)
  2. Cordylite-(La) (IMA2010-058) 5.BD.05 [no]
    (IUPAC: sodium barium dilanthanum fluoro tetracarbonate)
91. Corkite (alunite, beudandite: IMA1987 s.p.) 8.BL.05
  (IUPAC: lead triiron(III) hexahydro sulfate phosphate)
92. Cornetite (Y: 1912) 8.BE.15
  (IUPAC: tricopper trihydro phosphate)
93. Cornubite (IMA1962 s.p., 1959) 8.BD.30
  (IUPAC: pentacopper tetrahydro diarsenate)
94. Cornwallite (Y: 1847) 8.BD.05
  (IUPAC: pentacopper tetrahydro diarsenate)
95. Coronadite (hollandite, coronadite: 1904) 4.DK.05a
  (IUPAC: lead hexamanganese(IV) dimanganese(II) hexadecaoxide)
96. Correianevesite (reddingite: IMA2013-007) 8.0 [no] [no]
  (IUPAC: iron(II) dimanganese(II) diphosphate trihydrate)
97. Corrensite (Y: 1954) 9.EC.60
  1. Low layer charge corrensite (LLC): 1:1 regular interstratification of a trioctahedral chlorite with a trioctahedral vermiculite
  2. High layer charge corrensite (HLC): 1:1 regular interstratification of a trioctahedral chlorite with a trioctahedral smectite
98. Cortesognoite (lawsonite: 2014–029) 9.0 [no] [no]
  (IUPAC: calcium divanadium heptaoxy disilicate dihydroxyl hydrate)
99. Corundum (Y: old/ 1714?) 4.CB.05
  (IUPAC: dialuminium trioxide)
100. Corvusite (straczekite: 1933) 4.HE.20
101. Cosalite (Y: 1868) 2.JB.10
  (IUPAC: dilead pentasulfa dibismuthide)
  Note: Cu and Ag might substitute some Pb (Topa, D. and Makovicky, E., 2010).
102. Coskrenite-(Ce) (sulfate-oxalate: IMA1996-056) 10.AB.65
  (IUPAC: dicerium disulfate oxalate octahydrate)
103. Cossaite (IMA2009-031) 7.0 [no]
104. Costibite (löllingite: IMA1969-014) 2.EB.10d
  (IUPAC: cobalt antimonide sulfide)
105. Cotunnite (Y: 1825) 3.DC.85
  (IUPAC: lead(II) chloride)
106. Coulsonite (spinel, spinel: IMA1962 s.p. Rd) 4.BB.05
  (IUPAC: iron(II) divanadium(III) tetraoxide)
107. Cousinite^{Q} (Y: 1954) 7.HA.10 [no]
  Note: incomplete description, might be a Mg-umohoite.
108. Coutinhoite (IMA2003-025) 9.AK.30 [no]
109. Covellite (Y: 1832) 2.CA.05a
  (IUPAC: copper sulfide)
110. Cowlesite (zeolitic tectosilicate: IMA1975-016) 9.GG.05
  (Ca(Al_{2}Si_{3})O_{10}•(5-6)H_{2}O)
111. Coyoteite (IMA1978-042) 2.FD.25
  (IUPAC: sodium triiron pentasulfide dihydrate)

=== Cr – Cy ===
1. Crandallite (alunite, crandallite: IMA1999 s.p., 1917 Rd) 8.BL.10
  (IUPAC: calcium trialuminium hexahydro phosphate hydroxophosphate)
2. Cranswickite (IMA2010-016) 7.CB.15 [no] [no]
  (IUPAC: magnesium sulfate tetrahydrate)
3. Crawfordite (bradleyite: IMA1993-030) 5.BF.10
  (IUPAC: trisodium strontium phosphate carbonate)
4. Creaseyite (IMA1974-044) 9.HH.15
5. Crednerite (Y: 1849) 4.AB.05
  (IUPAC: copper(II) manganese(II) dioxide)
6. Creedite (Y: 1916) 3.CG.15
  (IUPAC: tricalcium dialuminium dihydro sulfate octafluoride dihydrate)
7. Crerarite (rocksalt, galena: IMA1994-003) 2.LB.45
8. Crichtonite (crichtonite: IMA1980 s.p., 1814) 4.CC.40
9. Criddleite (IMA1987-037) 2.LA.25
10. Crimsonite (carminite: IMA2014-095) 8.0 [no] [no]
  (IUPAC: lead diiron(III) dihydro diphosphate)
11. Cristobalite (cristobalite: 1887) 4.DA.15
  (IUPAC: dioxosilicate)
12. Crocobelonite (IMA2020-005) 8.0 [no] [no]
13. Crocoite (monazite: 1763) 7.FA.20
  (IUPAC: lead(II) chromate)
14. Cronstedtite (serpentine: 1821) 9.ED.15
15. Cronusite (IMA1999-018) 2.FB.05
  (Ca_{0.2}CrS_{2}·2H_{2}O)
16. Crookesite (Y: 1867) 2.BD.50
  (IUPAC: heptacopper thallium tetraselenide)
17. Crowningshieldite (IMA2018-072) 2.0 [no] [no]
  ((Ni_{0.9}Fe_{0.10})S)
18. Cryobostryxite (IMA2014-058) 3.0 [no] [no]
  (IUPAC: potassium zinc trichloride dihydrate)
19. Cryolite (double perovskite: 1799) 3.CB.15
  (IUPAC: trisodium hexafluoroaluminate)
20. Cryolithionite (garnet: 1904) 3.CB.05
  (Na_{3}Al_{2}(LiF_{4})_{3})
21. Cryptochalcite (cryptochalcite: IMA2014-106) 7.0 [no] [no]
  (IUPAC: dipotassium pentacopper oxopentasulfate)
22. Cryptohalite (fluorosilicate: 1872) 3.CH.15
  (IUPAC: diammonium hexafluorosilicate)
23. Cryptomelane (hollandite, coronadite: IMA1982 s.p.?, 1942) 4.DK.05a
  (K((Mn^{4+})_{7}Mn^{3+})O_{16})
24. Cryptophyllite (IMA2008-061) 9.0
  (IUPAC: dipotassium calcium decaoxytetrasilicate pentahydrate)
25. Cualstibite (hydrotalcite: IMA1983-068 Rd) 4.FB.10
  (IUPAC: dicopper aluminium hexahydroxide [antimony hexahydroxide])
26. Cuatrocapaite
  1. Cuatrocapaite-(K) (IMA2018-084) 4.0 [no] [no]
  2. Cuatrocapaite-(NH4) (IMA2018-083) 4.0 [no] [no]
27. Cubanite (cubanite: 1843) 2.CB.55a
  (IUPAC: copper diiron trisulfide)
28. Cuboargyrite (rocksalt, galena: IMA1997-004) 2.JA.15
  (IUPAC: silver disulfa antimonide)
29. Cubothioplumbite (IMA2021-091)
30. Cumengeite (IMA2007 s.p., 1893) 3.DB.20
  (Pb_{21}Cu_{20}Cl_{42}(OH)_{40}·6H_{2}O)
31. Cummingtonite [Mg-Fe-Mn-amphibole: IMA2012 s.p., 1824] 09.DE.05
32. Cupalite (alloy: IMA1983-084) 1.AA.20
  (IUPAC: copper aluminide)
33. Cuprite (Y: 1845) 4.AA.10
  (IUPAC: dicopper(I) oxide)
34. Cuproauride^{Q} (Y: 1939) 1.AA.10a [no] [no]
  (IUPAC: tricopper gold alloy)
  Note: it might be auricupride.
35. Cuprobismutite (Y: 1884) 2.JA.10a
  (Cu_{8}AgBi_{13}S_{24})
36. Cuprocopiapite (copiapite: 1938) 7.DB.35
  (IUPAC: copper tetrairon dihydro hexasulfate icosahydrate)
37. Cuprodongchuanite (dongchuanite: IMA2021-065) [no] [no] [no]
38. Cuproiridsite (spinel, linnaeite: IMA1984-016) 2.DA.05
  (IUPAC: copper diiridium tetrasulfide)
39. Cuprokalininite (spinel, linnaeite: IMA2010-008) 2.DA.05 [no]
  (IUPAC: copper dichromium tetrasulfide)
40. Cupromakopavonite (pavonite: IMA2005-036) 2.JA.05a [no] [no]
  (Cu_{8}Pb_{4}Ag_{3}Bi_{19}S_{38})
41. Cupromakovickyite (pavonite: IMA2002-058) 2.JA.05d
  (Cu_{4}AgPb_{2}Bi_{9}S_{18})
42. Cupromolybdite (vergasovaite: IMA2011-005) 7. [no]
  (IUPAC: tricopper(II) oxo dimolybdate)
43. Cuproneyite (neyite: IMA2008-053) 2.JB.25i [no] [no]
  (Cu_{7}Pb_{27}Bi_{25}S_{68})
44. Cupropavonite (pavonite: IMA1978-033) 2.JA.05a
  (Cu_{0.9}Ag_{0.5}Pb_{0.6}Bi_{2.5}S_{5})
45. Cupropearceite (pearceite-polybasite: IMA2007-046) 2.GB.15 [no]
  ([Cu_{6}As_{2}S_{7}][Ag_{9}CuS_{4}])
46. Cupropolybasite (pearceite-polybasite: IMA2008-004) 2.GB.15 [no]
  ([Cu_{6}Sb_{2}S_{7}][Ag_{9}CuS_{4}])
47. Cuprorhodsite (spinel, linnaeite: IMA2017-H, IMA1984-017) 2.DA.05
  (((Cu^{1+)}_{0.5}(Fe^{3+)}_{0.5})(Rh^{3+})_{2}S_{4})
48. Cuprorivaite (gillespite: IMA1962 s.p., 1938 Rd) 9.EA.05
  (IUPAC: calcium copper decaoxy tetrasilicate)
49. Cuprosklodowskite (Y: 1933) 9.AK.10
  (IUPAC: copper diuranyl di(hydrotrioxysilicate) hexahydrate)
50. Cuprospinel (spinel, spinel: IMA1971-020) 4.BB.05
  (IUPAC: copper(II) diiron(III) tetraoxide)
51. Cuprostibite (metalloid alloy: 1969) 2.AA.20
  (IUPAC: dicopper (antimony,thallium))
52. Cuprotungstite (Y: 1869) 7.GB.15
  (IUPAC: tricopper(II) dihydro ditungstate)
53. Cuprozheshengite (IMA2021-095a)
54. Curetonite (laueite, laueite: IMA1978-065) 8.BK.15
  (Ba(Al,Ti)(PO_{4})(OH,O)F)
55. Curienite (fritzscheite: IMA1967-049) 4.HB.15
  (IUPAC: lead diuranyl divanadate pentahydrate)
56. Curite (Y: 1921) 4.GB.55
57. Currierite (IMA2016-030) 8.0 [no] [no]
  (Na_{4}Ca_{3}MgAl_{4}(AsO_{3}OH)_{12}·9H_{2}O)
58. Cuspidine (woehlerite: 1876) 9.BE.17
  (IUPAC: octacalcium tetrafluoro heptaoxodisilicate)
59. Cuyaite (IMA2019-126) 4.0 [no] [no]
60. Cuzticite (tellurium oxysalt: IMA1980-071) 4.FM.35
  (IUPAC: diiron(II) tellurium(VI) hexaoxide trihydrate)
61. Cyanochroite (picromerite: 1855) 7.CC.60
  (IUPAC: dipotassium copper disulfate hexahydrate)
62. Cyanotrichite (cyanotrichite: IMA1967 s.p., 1839) 7.DE.10
  (IUPAC: tetracopper dialuminium dodecahydro sulfate diwater)
63. Cylindrite (cylindrite: 1893) 2.HF.25a
  (IUPAC: iron tripalladium tetratin tetrasulfa diantimonide)
64. Cymrite (Y: 1949) 9.EG.05
65. Cyprine (vesuvianite: IMA2015-044) 9.BG.35 [no] [no]
66. Cyrilovite (wardite: 1953) 8.DL.10
  (IUPAC: sodium triiron(III) tetrahydro diphosphate dihydrate)
67. Czochralskiite (aphthitalite: IMA2015-011) 8.0 [no] [no]
  (IUPAC: tetrasodium tricalcium magnesium tetraphosphate)
