= Kampfite =

Phyllosilicate mineral

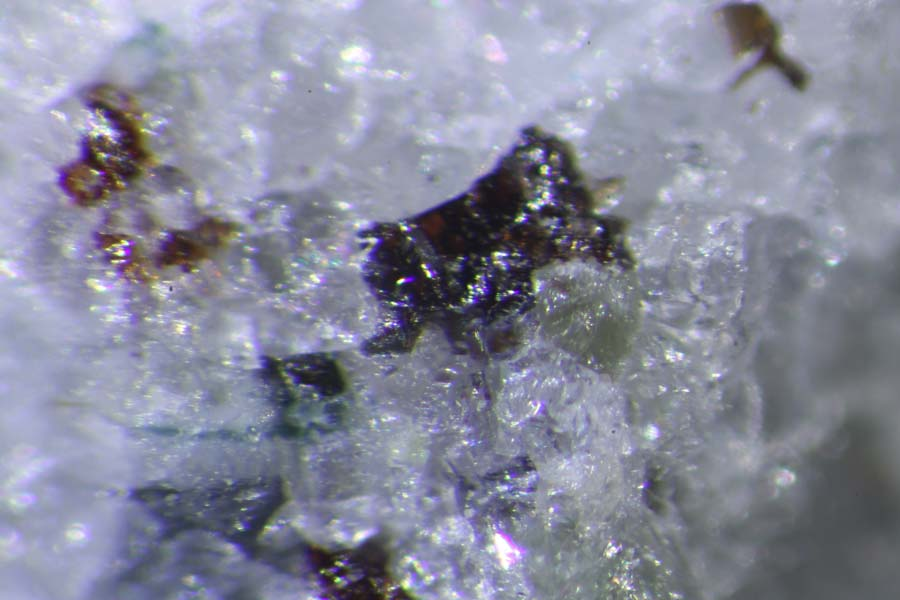
- Traskite (brown) and Kampfite (bluish), from Big Creek, Fresno County, California, United States of America

General
- Category: Phyllosilicate minerals
- Formula: Ba_{12}(Si_{11}Al_{5})O_{31}(CO_{3})_{8}Cl_{5}
- IMA symbol: Kpfb
- Strunz classification: 9.EG.20
- Crystal system: Monoclinic
- Crystal class: Domatic (m) (same H-M symbol)
- Space group: Cc
- Unit cell: a = 31.2329, b = 5.2398 c = 9.0966 [Å]; β = 106.933°; Z = 1

Identification
- Color: Light blue gray
- Crystal habit: Irregular grains or anhedral crystal inclusions
- Cleavage: Good on {001}
- Fracture: Uneven
- Tenacity: Brittle
- Mohs scale hardness: 3
- Luster: Vitreous
- Streak: White
- Diaphaneity: Translucent
- Specific gravity: 3.45
- Optical properties: Uniaxial – (strongly pseudohexagonal)
- Refractive index: n_{ω} = 1.642 n_{ε} = 1.594
- Birefringence: δ = 0.048

Kampfite is a rare barium silicate–carbonate–halide mineral with the chemical formula Ba_{12}(Si_{11}Al_{5})O_{31}(CO_{3})_{8}Cl_{5}. Discovered in 1964 and described in 2001, it is named after Anthony R. Kampf. The mineral is known only from Fresno County, California.

== Description ==
Kampfite is translucent and light blue-gray in color. Specimens occur as irregular masses up to 1 cm (0.39 in) in size.

== Composition and structure ==
When first described, the formula was identified as Ba_{6}[(Si,Al)O_{2}]_{8}(CO_{3})_{2}Cl_{2}(Cl,H_{2}O)_{2}. Subsequent work on analyzing the crystal structure led to a revised formula of Ba_{12}(Si_{11}Al_{5})O_{31}(CO_{3})_{8}Cl_{5}. The structural H_{2}O noted in the original description was not found in the later work.

The structure consists of double layers of tetrahedra connected by barium-containing polyhedra. It is this layering which causes kampfite's one perfect cleavage. Kampfite shares chemical and structural similarities with cymrite. As of 2007, it is the only known barium silicate carbonate aside from fencooperite.

== Occurrence ==
Kampfite has been found in association with celsian, fresnoite, macdonaldite, pyrrhotite, titantaramellite, traskite, and witherite. The mineral is known only from locations in Fresno County, California. Kampfite is found in quartz-rich regions of sanbornite rocks within gneiss which has undergone contact metamorphism associated with an adjacent granodiorite intrusive.

== History ==
The mineral discovered in 1964 by Robert Walstrom from the Esquire #1 claim of the Rush Creek deposit in eastern Fresno County. It was described in 2001 in The Canadian Mineralogist. The mineral was named kampfite in honor of Anthony Robert Kampf (1948–), curator of the Los Angeles County Museum of Natural History, for his crystallography work on new and rare minerals.

Co-type specimens are held by the University of British Columbia and the Geological Survey of Canada.
