= Chrysothallite =

Rare thallium-bearing chloride mineral

General
- Category: Halide mineral
- Formula: K_{6}Cu_{6}Tl^{3+}Cl_{17}(OH)_{4}•H_{2}O
- IMA symbol: Cry
- Crystal system: Tetragonal
- Crystal class: Ditetragonal dipyramidal (4/mmm); H-M symbol: (4/m 2/m 2/m)
- Space group: I4/mmm
- Unit cell: a = 11.37 Å, b = 26.21 Å (approximated); Z = 4

Identification
- Color: Golden-yellow to light yellow
- Crystal habit: tabular
- Cleavage: None
- Fracture: Uneven
- Tenacity: Brittle
- Luster: Vitreous
- Streak: White
- Diaphaneity: Transparent
- Density: 2.95 (measured)
- Optical properties: Uniaxial (+)
- Refractive index: ω=1.72, ε=1.73 (approximated)

Chrysothallite is a rare thallium-bearing chloride mineral with the formula K_{6}Cu_{6}Tl^{3+}Cl_{17}(OH)_{4}•H_{2}O. Chrysothallite is unique in being only the second mineral with essential trivalent thallium, a feature shared with natural thallium(III) oxide, avicennite. Another examples of natural thallium chlorides are steropesite, Tl_{3}BiCl_{6}, and lafossaite, TlCl. Chrysothallite is one of numerous fumarolic minerals discovered among fumarolic sites of the Tolbachik volcano, Kamchatka, Russia The mineral is named in allusion to its colour and thallium content.

== Notes on chemistry ==
Chrysothallite contains a relative high amount of zinc admixture. Zinc is substituting for copper.

== Association and origin ==
Chrysothallite may be associated with many other minerals:

- chlorides: atacamite, avdoninite, belloite, eriochalcite, mitscherlichite, sanguite, carnallite, halite, sylvite;
- sulfates: antlerite, chlorothionite, kröhnkite, natrochalcite, gypsum, kainite

== Crystal structure ==
The crystal structure of chrysothallite is unique. Its building elements are:

- layer of distorted CuCl_{4}(OH)_{2} octahedra, in which the octahedra share edges
- isolated Tl-centered TlCl_{6} octahedra
- isolated Tl-centered TlCl_{4}(H_{2}O)_{2} octahedra
- KCl_{6} and KCl_{9} polyhedra, that connect all the above elements

== Origin ==
Chrysothallite is supposed to be a product of interaction of relatively high-temperature fumarolic minerals with fumarolic gas and atmospheric water, that takes place in temperatures up to 150 °C (302 °F).
