= Charleshatchettite =

Niobium oxide mineral

General
- Category: Oxide
- Formula: CaNb_{4}O_{10}(OH)_{2}•8H_{2}O
- IMA symbol: Chh
- Crystal system: Monoclinic
- Crystal class: Prismatic (2/m) (same H-M symbol)
- Space group: C2/c
- Unit cell: a = 21.151(4), b = 6.496(1), c = 12.714(3) [Å], β = 103.96°

Identification

Charleshatchettite is a very rare, complex, niobium oxide mineral with the formula CaNb_{4}O_{10}(OH)_{2}•8H_{2}O. It was discovered in the mineral-rich site Mont Saint-Hilaire, Montérégie, Québec, Canada.

== Relation to other minerals ==
Charleshatchettite is chemically similar to hochelagaite.
