= Cyrilovite =

Hydrous sodium iron phosphate mineral

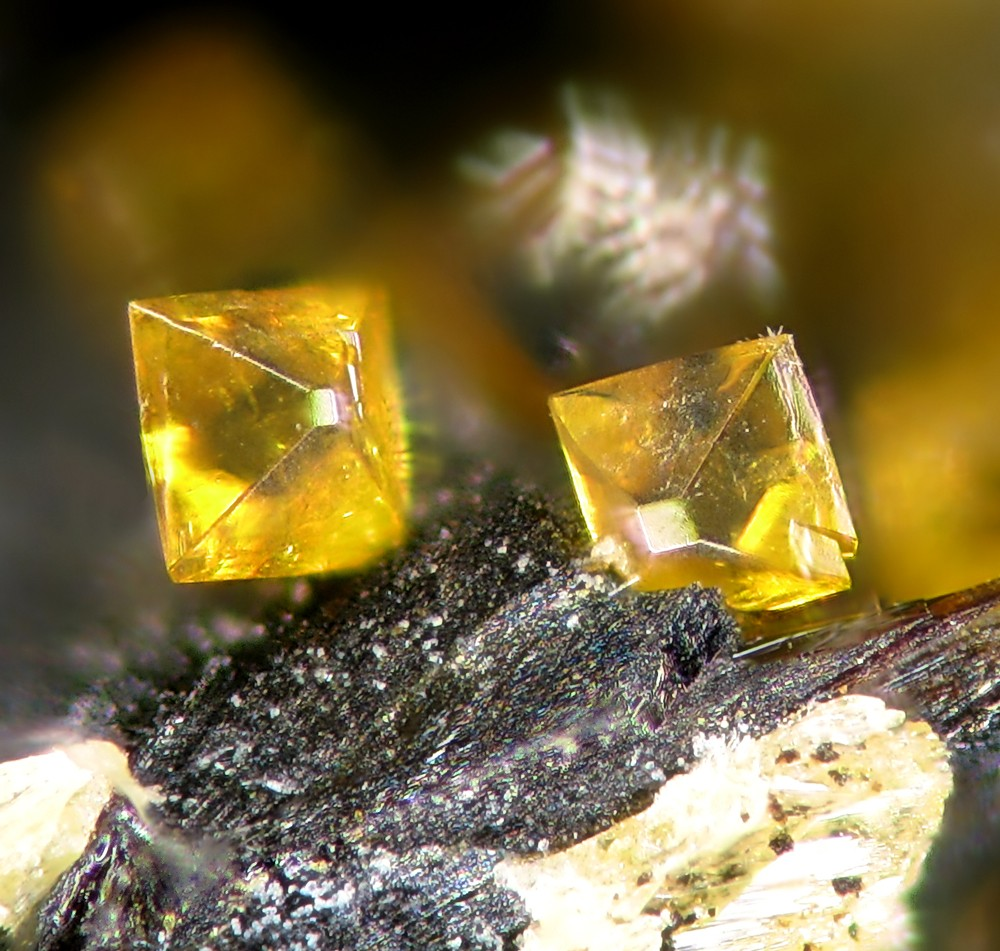

General
- Category: Phosphate mineral
- Formula: NaFe^{3+}_{3}(PO_{4})_{2}(OH)_{4}·2(H_{2}O)
- IMA symbol: Cyr
- Strunz classification: 8.DL.10
- Dana classification: 42.07.08.01
- Crystal system: Tetragonal
- Crystal class: Trapezohedral (422); H–M symbol: (422)
- Space group: P4_{1}2_{1}2

Identification
- Color: Bright yellow, honey-yellow, orange to brownish yellow, brown
- Crystal habit: Massive, granular, pseudo cubic, radiating to botryoidal aggregates and crusts
- Cleavage: None
- Fracture: Conchoidal
- Mohs scale hardness: 4
- Luster: Vitreous
- Streak: Yellow
- Diaphaneity: Translucent
- Specific gravity: 3.081–3.096
- Optical properties: Uniaxial (-)
- Refractive index: n_{ω} = 1.802–1.805, n_{ε} = 1.769–1.775
- Birefringence: δ = 0.033
- Pleochroism: Weak

Cyrilovite (NaFe_{3}^{3+}(PO_{4})_{2}(OH)_{4}·2(H_{2}O)) is a hydrous sodium iron phosphate mineral. It is isomorphous and isostructural with wardite, the sodium aluminium counterpart.

Cyrilovite is found in granitic pegmatites. It was first discovered in 1953 in a pegmatite at Cyrilov, near Velké Meźiřiči, West Moravia, Czech Republic.

== Composition ==
The chemical formula of cyrilovite is NaFe^{3+}_{3}(PO_{4})_{2}(OH)_{4}·2(H_{2}O). Parent phosphate minerals, fluorapatite and triplite-zwieselite, were transformed by hydrothermal alteration and weathering to give a complex, microcrystalline intergrowth of secondary phosphate minerals that include cyrilovite. The sequence of phosphate transformations ended with the formation of cyrilovite within the fluorapatite fractures and the replacement of fluorapatite by lipscombite and crandallite-group minerals. Fransolet suggest that a part of the leached Na leads to the precipitation of cyrilovite, in the fissures cause by the volume decrease resulting from the transformation of typhylite to heteresoite. Mobilization of alkalis and of relatively immobile elements including aluminium and rare-earth elements are subsequently incorporated into precipitating cyrilovite, lipscombite and crandallite-group minerals.

The chemical analysis shows substitution not only of Al for Fe, but also of K and Mn for Na, measured and observed specific gravities are considered to be in good agreement. Ferric iron occurs virtually alone in H_{2}O rich minerals such as phosphosiderite, and coupled with Na, K, or Ca in cyrilovite. It is soluble in hot dilute HCl, in hot dilute H_{2}SO_{4}, and, with difficulty, in hot dilute HNO_{3}. In the closed tube, it gives off water and fuses.

== Geologic occurrence ==
The mineral wardite is capable of crystallizing in a similar form to that of cyrilovite because of their closely related chemical compositions. Between wardite's composition, NaAl_{3}(PO_{4})_{2}(OH)_{4}·2(H_{2}O), and cyrilovite's composition, NaFe_{3}(PO_{4})_{2}(OH)_{4}·2(H_{2}O), they are able to form end members of a series of solid solutions. Either of the two minerals can occur in various proportions in a series of solid solutions in the wardite mineral group. Cyrilovite is a rare accessory mineral in some oxidizing phosphate-bearing granite pegmatitles and iron deposits. The sequence of phosphate transformations ended with the formation of cyrilovite within the F-apatite factures and the replacement of F-apatite by lipscombite and crandillite-group minerals. Weathering-related cyrilovite, lipscombite, and crandillite-group minerals were formed by percolating meteoric waters under increasing oxygen fugacity.

== Structure ==
The crystal structures of natural wardite and of the isomorphous cyrilovite have the space group P41212, Z=4). Hydrogen atoms were not located, but reasonable positions can be estimated. The cell dimensions of cyrilovite are: c = 19.4, a = 7.32 Å.

The individual crystals are usually smaller than 0.1 mm and many of them are intergrown. Crystals are squat and when single tend to lie on the basal pinacoid. The pinacoid {001} and the dipyramid {113} are the dominant forms; all the faces of these forms tend to be present and equally well developed. The dipyramid {012} is not always present. The direction for the a-axis is at 45° angle to the smallest primitive unit cell.

== Physical properties ==
Cyrilovite is a vitreous translucent mineral that can appear in colors ranging from a bright yellow, honey-yellow, orange to brownish yellow, or brown and it has a hardness of 4. It has a yellow streak. The mineral is classified under the space group P4_{1}2_{1}2 and is tetragonal.
