= Cacoxenite =

Iron aluminium phosphate mineral

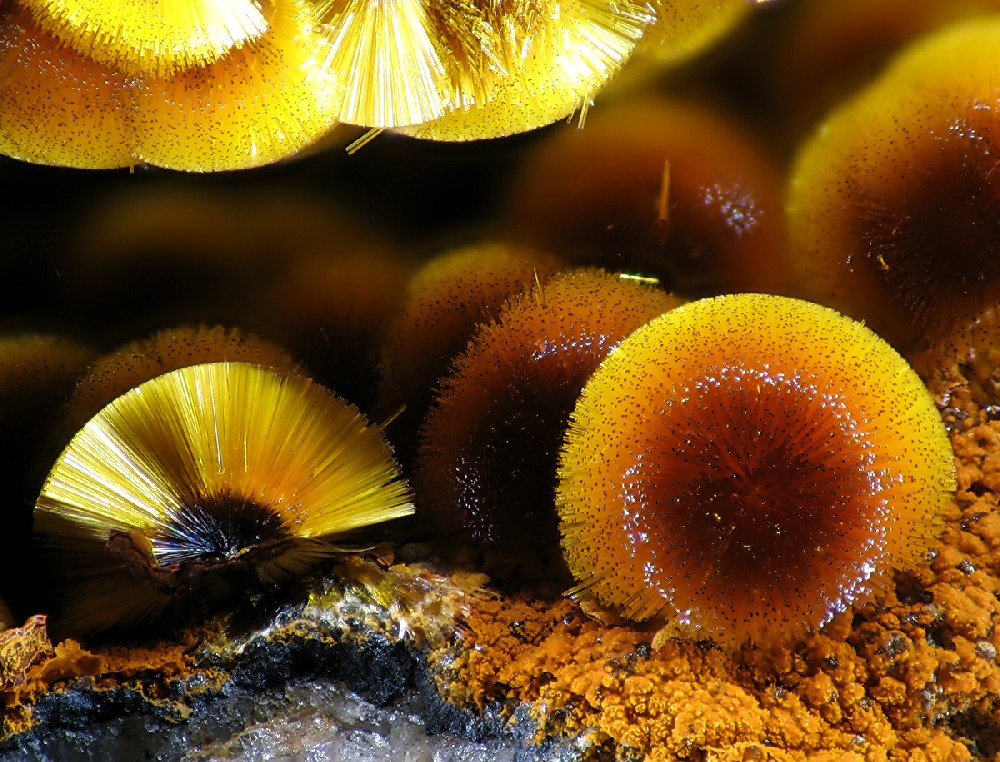
- Cacoxenite, Minas de Horcajo, Castile-La Mancha, Spain

General
- Category: Phosphate minerals
- Formula: Fe^{3+}_{24}Al(PO_{4})_{17}O_{6}(OH)_{12}·17(H_{2}O)
- IMA symbol: Cac
- Strunz classification: 8.DC.40
- Crystal system: Hexagonal
- Crystal class: Dipyramidal (6/m) (same H-M symbol)
- Space group: P6_{3}/m
- Unit cell: a = 27.559(1) Å, c = 10.55 Å; Z = 2

Identification
- Color: Yellow to brownish yellow, reddish orange, golden yellow, deep orange, green; yellow in transmitted light
- Crystal habit: Acicular, radial, stellate
- Cleavage: None
- Fracture: Uneven
- Mohs scale hardness: 3–4
- Luster: Silky
- Streak: White
- Diaphaneity: semitransparent
- Specific gravity: 2.2–2.6
- Optical properties: Uniaxial (+)
- Refractive index: n_{ω} = 1.575 – 1.585 n_{ε} = 1.635 – 1.656
- Birefringence: δ = 0.060
- Pleochroism: visible: O = Pale yellow E = Canary yellow to yellow orange

Cacoxenite is an iron aluminium phosphate mineral with formula: Fe^{3+}_{24}Al(PO_{4})_{17}O_{6}(OH)_{12}·17(H_{2}O). Cacoxenite is associated with iron ores. The name comes from the Greek κăκός for "bad" or "evil" and ξένος for "guest" because the phosphorus content of cacoxenite lessens the quality of iron smelted from ore containing it.

It was first described in 1825 for an occurrence in the Hrbek Mine, Bohemia, Czech Republic. It occurs as a secondary phase in oxidized magnetite and limonite deposits. It also occurs in novaculites and in iron and phosphorus rich sediments.

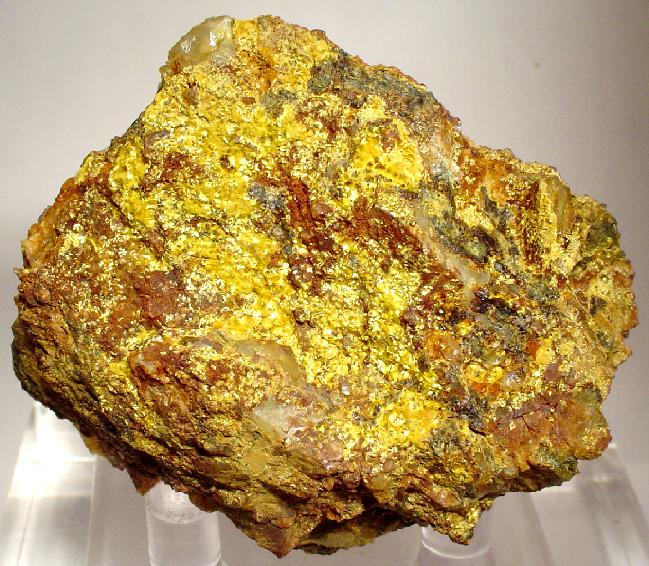
Cacoxenite, 6.2 × 5.4 × 4.1 cm, Fort Lismeenagh, Shanagolden, County Limerick, Ireland
