= Castellaroite =

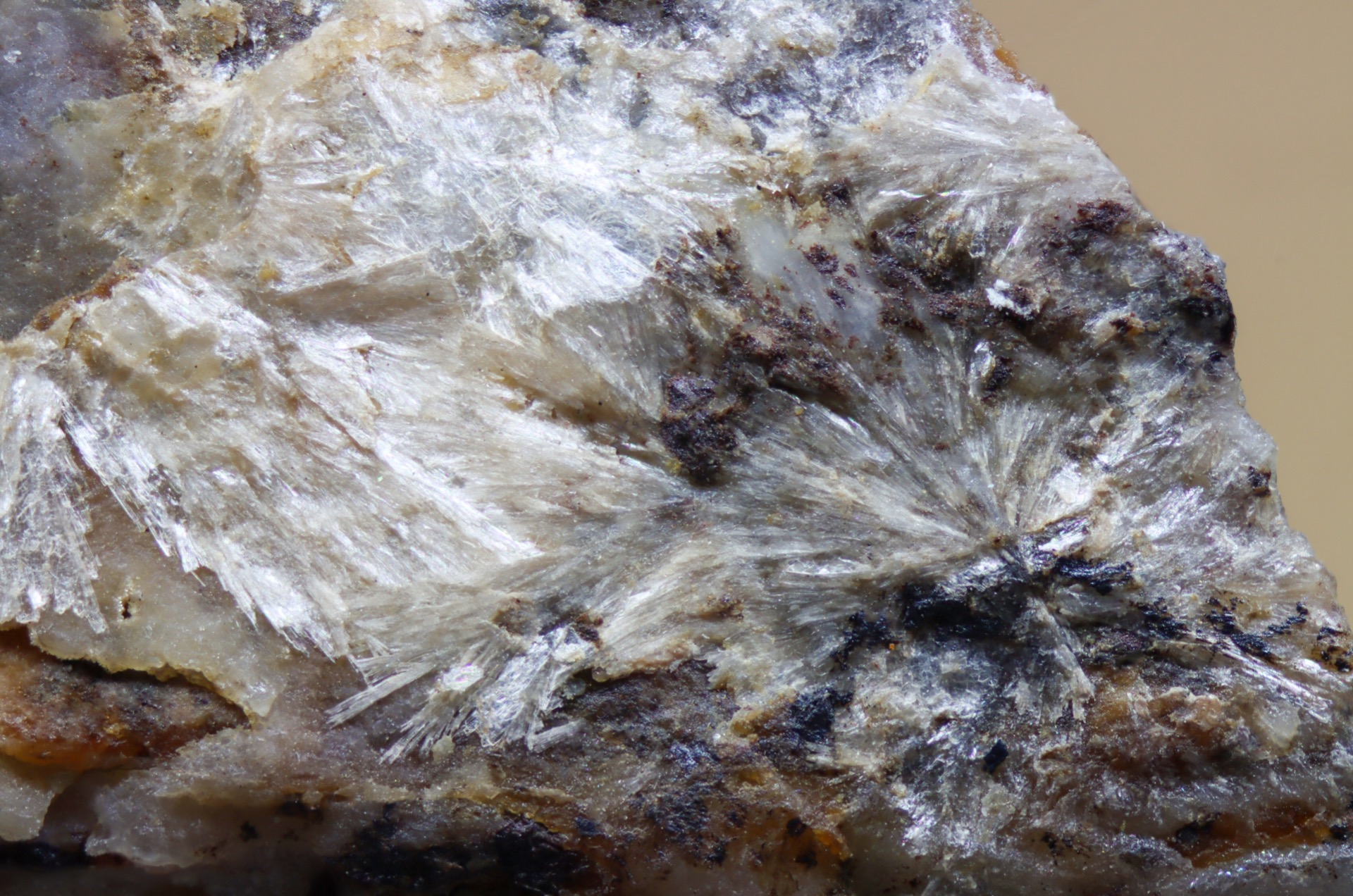
- A close up picture of the mineral

General
- Category: Minerals
- Formula: Mn_{3}(AsO_{4})_{2}•4H_{2}O
- IMA symbol: Ctr

Identification
- Color: Colorless
- Luster: Vitreous, Silky
- Specific gravity: 3.14

Castellaroite is a rare arsenate mineral with formula Mn_{3}(AsO_{4})_{2}•4H_{2}O. It is related to the phosphate mineral metaswitzerite. Castellaroite is monoclinic, with space group P2_{1}/n. The other natural manganese arsenate hydrate is manganohörnesite, which is an octahydrate.
