= Sanguite =

Bright red halide mineral

General
- Category: Halides
- Formula: KCuCl₃
- IMA symbol: Sgu
- Crystal system: monoclinic
- Crystal class: 2/m
- Space group: 2/ m - prismatic
- Unit cell: V = 481.38 Å³

Identification
- Color: bright red
- Twinning: polysynthetic twinning has been observed.
- Cleavage: Perfect
- Fracture: staggered, step-like
- Tenacity: fragile
- Luster: Vitreous
- Streak: reddish orange
- Density: 2.86(1) g/cm³ (measured); 2.88 g/cm³ (calculated)
- Optical properties: biaxial
- Refractive index: n α = 1.653(3) n β = 1.780(6) n γ = 1.900(8)
- Birefringence: δ = 0.247
- Pleochroism: strong
- 2V angle: Measured: 85° (5) Calculated: 82°
- Dispersion: very strong

Sanguite is a halide mineral. It is named after the Latin word sanguis, meaning blood, due to its bright red colouration. It was approved as a valid species by the International Mineralogical Association in 2013.

== Characteristics ==
Sanguite is a chloride with the chemical formula KCuCl_{3}. It crystallizes in the monoclinic system and has a Mohs scale hardness of 3.

== Formation and deposition ==
Sanguite was discovered in the Glavnaya Tenoritovaya fumarole on the Tolbachik volcano in Kamchatka Krai, Russia, the only place on Earth where it is known to form. There it forms in clusters or crusts as fine prismatic crystals up to 1 mm long and 0.2 mm thick.
