= Cuprozheshengite =

General
- Category: Arsenate-phosphate
- Formula: Pb₄CuZn₂(AsO₄)₂(PO₄)₂(OH)₂
- Crystal system: Triclinic
- Crystal class: Pinacoidal (1)

Identification
- Color: Apple green to greenish blue
- Crystal habit: Radial hemispheric aggregates of bladed crystals
- Cleavage: Perfect on {011}
- Fracture: Brittle
- Mohs scale hardness: 2.5–3
- Luster: Vitreous
- Streak: White

Cuprozheshengite is a rare supergene lead-copper-zinc arsenate-phosphate mineral with the chemical formula Pb_{4}CuZn_{2}(AsO_{4})_{2}(PO_{4})_{2}(OH)_{2}. Officially approved by the International Mineralogical Association (IMA) in 2021, its formal description was published in 2024.

== Occurrence ==
The mineral was discovered in the Yunnan Province of China, with co-type localities at the Laochang Ore Mine in Gejiu and the Dongchuan Copper Mine in Kunming.

== Crystal structure ==
Cuprozheshengite is triclinic with space group P1̅. Its unit-cell parameters are a = 4.7977(8) Å, b = 8.5789(8) Å, c = 10.3855(9) Å, α = 97.270(8)°, β = 101.902(12)°, and γ = 91.495(11)°, with a unit-cell volume of 414.30(9) Å^{3} and Z = 1.

The structure consists of two types of heteropolyhedral columns extending along [100]. These columns are linked by corner-sharing between Zn- and As/P-bearing polyhedra to form layers parallel to (011), with Pb atoms occupying sites between the layers. Single-crystal X-ray diffraction indicates that arsenic and phosphorus are distributed preferentially between different tetrahedral sites, with arsenic tending to occupy the X1 site. Density functional theory calculations support this site preference and indicate that the observed ordering contributes to structural stability.
