= Carmeltazite =

Oxide mineral

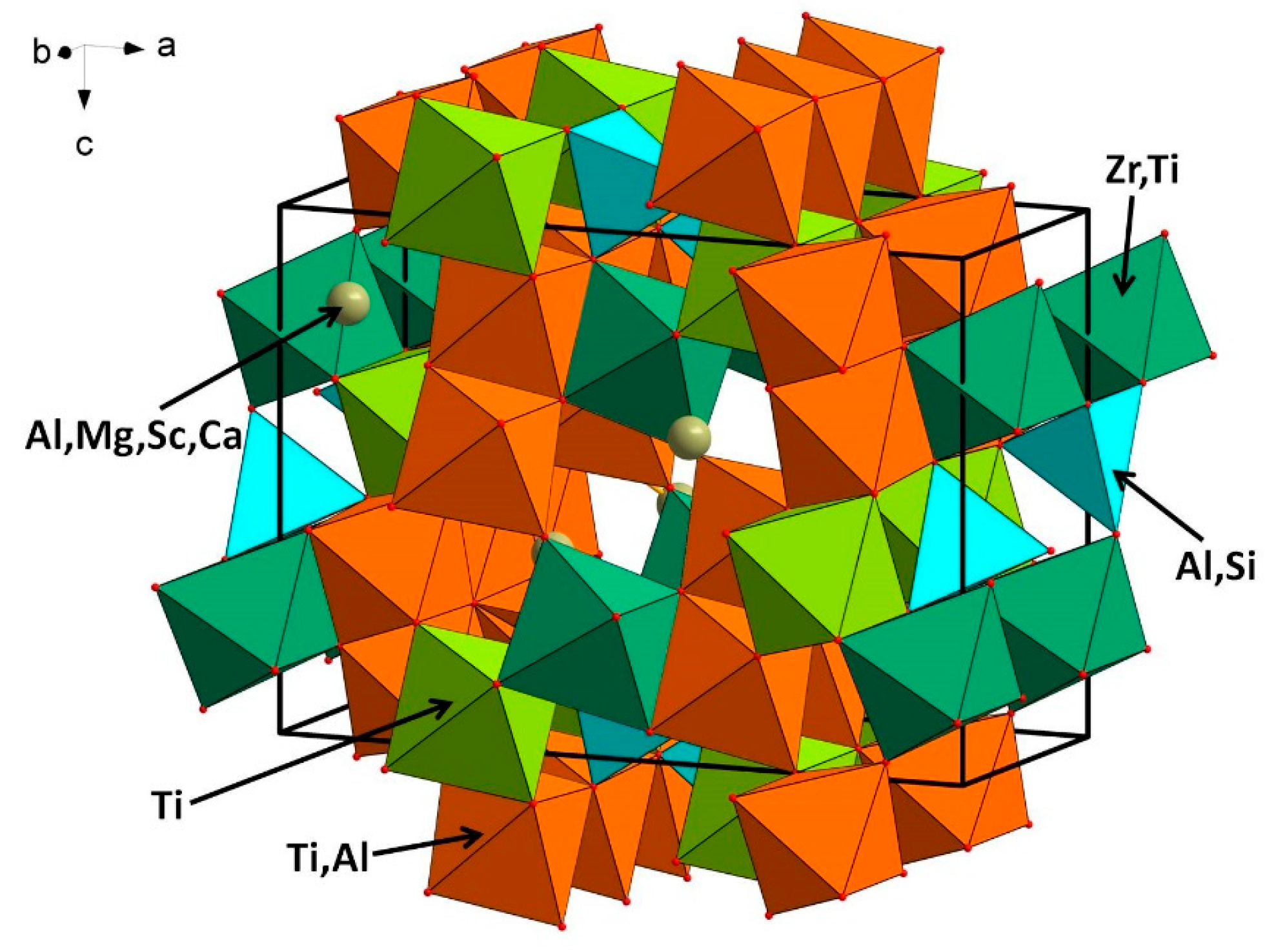
Crystal structure of carmeltazite

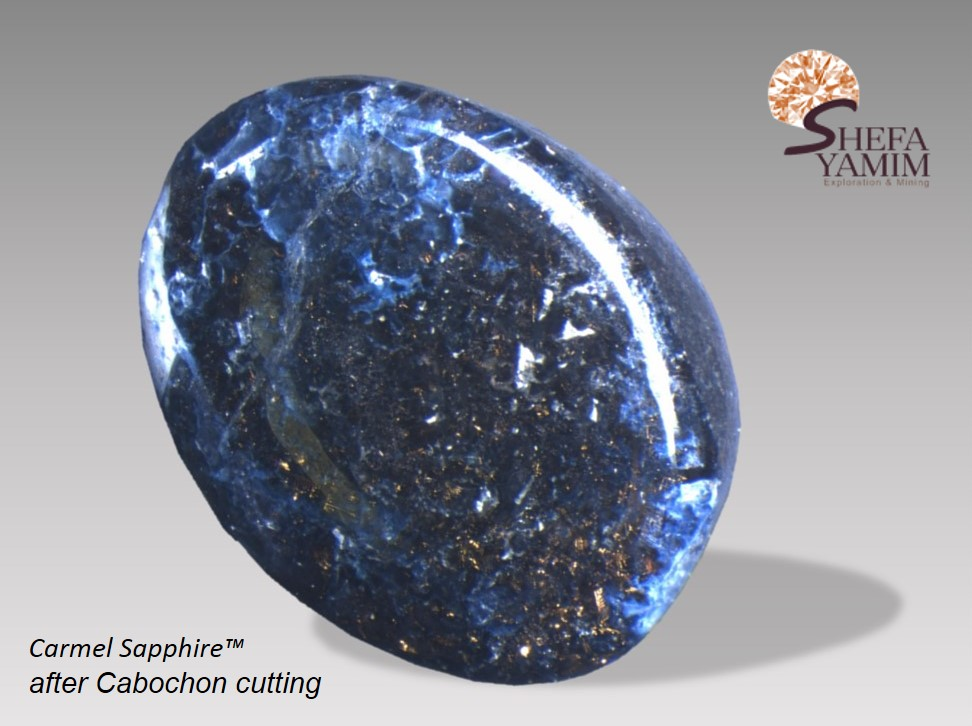
Carmel Sapphire

Carmeltazite is a rare oxide mineral. Its first discovery on Earth was announced in 2019, after it was found in Zebulun Valley in Israel. The chemical formula for carmeltazite is ZrAl_{2}Ti_{4}O_{11}.

The International Mineralogical Association's Commission on New Minerals and Mineral Names approved the registration of the mineral under application 2018-103. The name is a combination of the location it was found (Mount Carmel) and the major elements (titanium, aluminium and zirconium). It has properties similar to Allendeite.
