= Cornetite =

Phosphate of copper

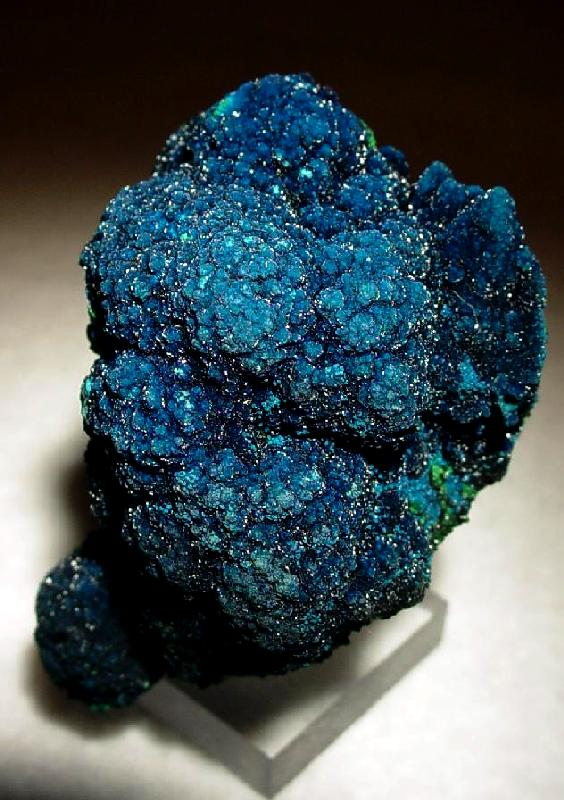
- Cornetite from the type locality, Star of the Congo Mine, Lubumbashi, Haut-Katanga District, Democratic Republic of the Congo. 5.7 × 3.9 × 3.9 cm in size

General
- Category: Phosphate minerals
- Formula: Cu_{3}PO_{4}(OH)_{3}
- IMA symbol: Cne
- Strunz classification: 8.BE.15
- Dana classification: 41.03.02.01
- Crystal system: Orthorhombic
- Crystal class: Dipyramidal (mmm); H-M symbol: (2/m 2/m 2/m)
- Space group: Pbca
- Unit cell: a = 10.845(10) Å, b = 14.045(10) Å, c = 7.081(5) Å; Z = 8

Identification
- Formula mass: 336.63 g/mol
- Color: Dark blue to green-blue
- Crystal habit: Crystals are short prismatic
- Twinning: On {h0l}
- Cleavage: None observed
- Mohs scale hardness: 4.5
- Luster: Vitreous
- Diaphaneity: Transparent to translucent
- Specific gravity: (Measured) 4.10
- Optical properties: Biaxial (−)
- Refractive index: n_{α} = 1.765 n_{β} = 1.810 n_{γ} = 1.820
- Birefringence: δ = 0.055 max
- Pleochroism: Non-pleochroic
- 2V angle: Measured: 33°, Calculated: 48°
- Dispersion: None
- Solubility: cold HCl

Cornetite is a phosphate of copper with hydroxyl, named after the geologist Jules Cornet. It was discovered in 1917.

== Type locality ==
Cornetite is most notably found in the Star of Congo mine, near Lubumbashi.

== Environment ==
Cornetite is a rare secondary mineral in some hydrothermal copper deposits.

== Structure ==
Unlike related phases such as pseudomalachite, the copper atoms are all five-fold coordinated by oxygen. There are three unique copper sites that are all quite distorted from ideal symmetry. Two are in approximate tetragonal pyramids and the third is essentially a trigonal bipyramidal coordination. Edge sharing polyhedra lead to copper-copper dimer formation, and the overall structure is a three-dimensional network of copper-oxygen polyhedra.
