= Chapmanite =

Phyllosilicate mineral

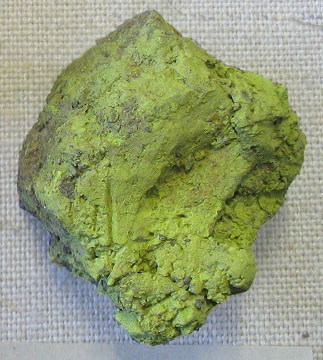
- Yellow-green earthy massive chapmanite

General
- Category: Phyllosilicate minerals
- Formula: Fe_{2}Sb(SiO_{4})_{2}(OH)
- IMA symbol: Cpm
- Strunz classification: 9.ED.25
- Crystal system: Monoclinic
- Crystal class: Domatic (m) (same H-M symbol)
- Space group: Cm

Identification
- Color: Yellow, green, olive green
- Crystal habit: Earthy massive; granular
- Cleavage: Poor
- Fracture: Conchoidal to irregular
- Mohs scale hardness: 2.5
- Luster: Nonmetallic, dull to adamantine
- Streak: Yellowish green
- Specific gravity: 3.69-3.75
- Refractive index: nα=1.850 nβ=1.950 nγ=1.960
- Pleochroism: None

Chapmanite is a rare silicate mineral belonging to the phyllosilicate group, discovered in 1924, and named in honour of the late Edward John Chapman (1821–1904), a geology professor at the University of Toronto. Chemically, it is an iron antimony silicate, closely related to bismutoferrite, and may contain aluminium impurities. It is closely associated with silver mines, most notably the Keeley mine in Ontario, Canada, found in quartz veinlets containing graphite in gneiss. It takes the form of a powdery, yellow-green, semitransparent solid, and leaves a streak of the same color. Early German texts have referred to the mineral as antimon-hypochlorite.

It was recently rediscovered in the southern hemisphere at the abandoned Argent lead mine in Bushveld series rocks of South Africa.
