= Cymrite =

Phyllosilicate mineral

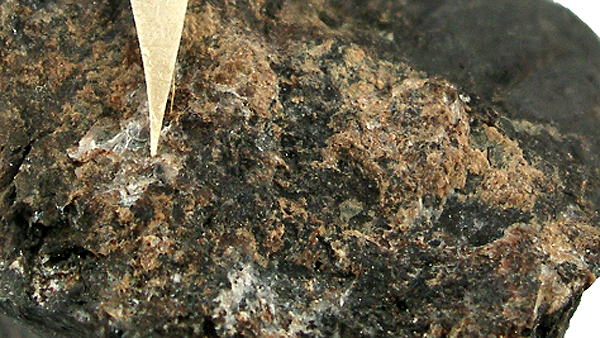
- Cymrite (2.2 x 1.6 x 1.6 cm)

General
- Category: Phyllosilicate minerals
- Formula: BaAl_{2}Si_{2}(O,OH)_{8}·(H_{2}O)
- IMA symbol: Cym
- Crystal system: Monoclinic
- Crystal class: Domatic (m) (same H-M symbol)
- Space group: Pm
- Unit cell: a = 5.32 Å, b = 36.6 Å, c = 7.66 Å; β = 90°; Z = 2

Identification
- Color: Brown, greenish, colorless
- Crystal habit: Micacious, sheet-like, pseudohexagonal, also fibrous
- Cleavage: Perfect on {001}, good on {110}
- Fracture: Uneven
- Tenacity: Brittle
- Mohs scale hardness: 2-3
- Luster: Silky, Vitreous
- Streak: White
- Diaphaneity: Transparent to translucent
- Specific gravity: 3.49
- Optical properties: Biaxial (-)
- Refractive index: nα = 1.611 nβ = 1.619 nγ = 1.621
- Birefringence: δ = 0.010
- 2V angle: 0-5°

Cymrite is a silicate mineral with the chemical formula BaAl_{2}Si_{2}(O,OH)_{8}·H_{2}O. The mineral is named for Cymru, which is the Welsh word for Wales.

Cymrite, with perfect cleavage and a monoclinic crystalline system, falls in the silicate group. Silicates are formed of Silicon and Oxygen bonding together to form tetrahedra. The symmetry of Cymrite is classified as having a mirror plane. It has a moderate relief, meaning the contrast between the mineral and the epoxy of a thin section makes cymrite easily visible. The birefringence of the mineral is 0.01. Cymrite, being monoclinic is anisotropic with two optic axes.

== Occurrence ==
Cymrite was discovered in Wales but is found in other areas throughout the United States, Africa, Greece and other parts of Europe. It occurs in generally high temperature-pressure areas such as the hydrothermal manganese silicate ore that makes up the Benalt Mine in Wales and in manganese rock that has undergone high-pressure metamorphism found in Greece. It is important to geologists because of its limited occurrence, when cymrite is present on a rock it indicates that the rock, at some point, must have experienced high pressure and temperature.
