= List of minerals recognized by the International Mineralogical Association =

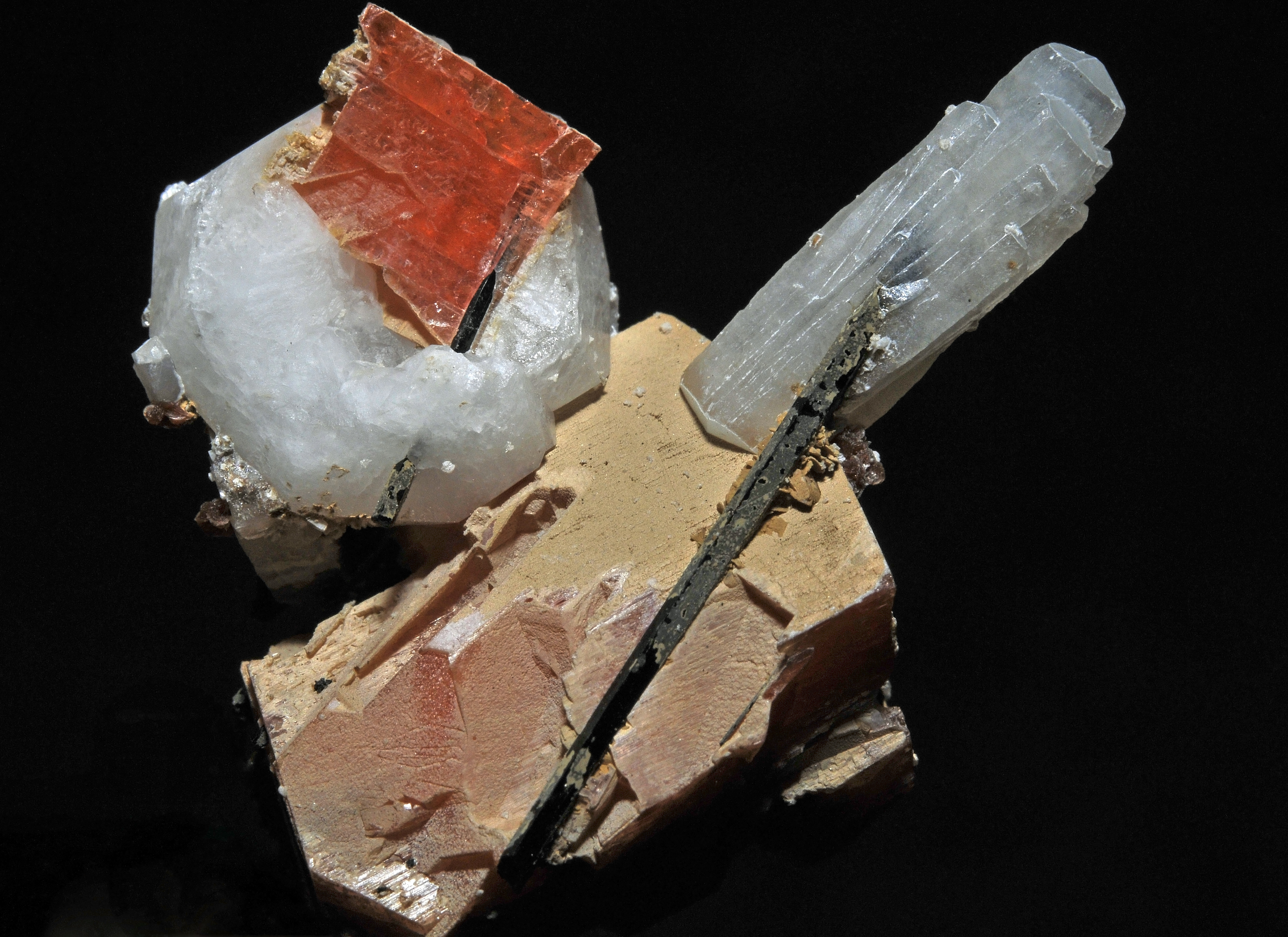
Crystals of serandite, natrolite, analcime, and aegirine from Mont Saint-Hilaire, Quebec, Canada

Mineralogy is an active science in which minerals are discovered or recognised on a regular basis. Use of old mineral names is also discontinued, for example when a name is no longer considered valid. Therefore, a list of recognised mineral species is never complete.

Minerals are distinguished by various chemical and physical properties. Differences in chemical composition and crystal structure distinguish the various species. Within a mineral species there may be variation in physical properties or minor amounts of impurities that are recognized by mineralogists or wider society as a mineral variety.

The International Mineralogical Association (IMA) is the international scientific group that recognises new minerals and new mineral names. However, minerals discovered before 1959 did not go through the official naming procedure. Some minerals published previously have been either confirmed or discredited since that date. This list contains a mixture of mineral names that have been approved since 1959 and those mineral names believed to still refer to valid mineral species (these are called "grandfathered" species). Presently, each year about 90–110 new mineral species (the sum of all mutations c. 120 per year) are officially approved by the Commission on New Minerals, Nomenclature and Classification (CNMNC) of the International Mineralogical Association.

As of August 2026, the IMA - CNMNC List of Minerals lists 6,226 valid minerals, including 1,153 pre-IMA minerals (grandfathered), and 97 questionable minerals. Also as of August 2026, the Mineralogical Society of America's Handbook of Mineralogy lists 5,663 species, and the IMA Database of Mineral Properties/RRUFF Project lists 6,006 valid species (IMA/CNMNC) of a total of 6,236 minerals. The IMA/RRUFF database includes 1,164 pre-IMA minerals.

Due to the length of this list, it is divided into alphabetical groups. The minerals are sorted by name.

- List of minerals recognized by the International Mineralogical Association (A)
- List of minerals recognized by the International Mineralogical Association (B)
- List of minerals recognized by the International Mineralogical Association (C)
- List of minerals recognized by the International Mineralogical Association (D)
- List of minerals recognized by the International Mineralogical Association (E)
- List of minerals recognized by the International Mineralogical Association (F)
- List of minerals recognized by the International Mineralogical Association (G)
- List of minerals recognized by the International Mineralogical Association (H)
- List of minerals recognized by the International Mineralogical Association (I)
- List of minerals recognized by the International Mineralogical Association (J)
- List of minerals recognized by the International Mineralogical Association (K)
- List of minerals recognized by the International Mineralogical Association (L)
- List of minerals recognized by the International Mineralogical Association (M)
- List of minerals recognized by the International Mineralogical Association (N)
- List of minerals recognized by the International Mineralogical Association (O)
- List of minerals recognized by the International Mineralogical Association (P–Q)
- List of minerals recognized by the International Mineralogical Association (R)
- List of minerals recognized by the International Mineralogical Association (S)
- List of minerals recognized by the International Mineralogical Association (T)
- List of minerals recognized by the International Mineralogical Association (U–V)
- List of minerals recognized by the International Mineralogical Association (W–X)
- List of minerals recognized by the International Mineralogical Association (Y–Z)

- Abbreviations:
  - "*" – discredited (IMA/CNMNC status).
  - "s.p." – special procedure.
  - ^{Q} or "?" – questionable/doubtful (IMA/CNMNC, mindat.org or mineralienatlas.de status).
  - ^{N} – published without approval of the IMA/CNMNC, or just not an IMA approved mineral but with some acceptance in the scientific community nowadays. The 'IMA database of mineral properties (rruff.info/ima) has 173 species with 'not an IMA approved mineral' tag, some are an intermediate member of a solid solution series, others are "recently" discredited minerals.
  - ^{I} – intermediate member of a solid-solution series.
  - ^{H} – hypothetical mineral (synthetic, anthropogenic, etc.)
    - ^{ch} – incomplete description, hypothetical solid solution end member. Published without approval and formally discredited or not yet approved.
      - Mainly: pyrochlore, tourmaline and amphibole supergroups, arrojadite, and yftisite-(Y). IMA/CNMNC revisions generate hypothetical solid solution endmembers.
  - group – a name used to designate a group of species, sometimes only a mineral group name.

== Working practices ==
- The name of a new mineral is kept confidential by the IMA until it is approved or until its full description is published, its authors' option (approved decision: 'IMA2009-D'). The IMA uses a code for its own procedures for the supposed new mineral (and so it is a synonym). Ferri-ottoliniite's proposal was assigned code 'IMA2001-067', it was redefined and approved as 'IMA2001-067a' in 2003, for instance (the ottoliniite root name is discredited since 2012).
- Current IMA regulations do not allow substances of anthropogenic origin (burning coal mine dumps, coal mine fires, slag, etc.) to be validated as a mineral species. Since 1998, the majority of polymorphs (especially polytypes and polytypoids) are not regarded as separate mineral species anymore.
- IMA/CNMNC identifiers are usually written without space, as years don't get meaningful hits on Google search.
- "The System of Mineralogy of James Dwight Dana and Edward Salisbury Dana" (8 ed.) was the reference of CNMNC/CNMMN's (IMA) initial work. At the Kobe 2006 general meeting, the IMA council endorsed the creation of an Internet site on minerals ('rruff.info/ima'). So a Master List was needed and the older minerals were reviewed in a document of 130 pages. The final GQN List was published (grandfathered, questionable and published without approval) after a final review of Burke E A J and Nickel E H (approved decision: 'IMA2006-C'). Not only the well established minerals before 1959 were grandfathered (G), but the minerals that could not be discredited as well. The merging of the 'ARD List' (approved, revalidated and discredited) with the 'GQN List' resulted in the first 'IMA/CNMNC List of Mineral Names'. The 2007 draft of the 'IMA/CNMNC List of Mineral Names' was a courtesy of the Materials Data, Inc. (MDI), its 2009 review had important modifications. The RRUFF database was built with the help of the MDI's 2007 draft, the IMA Master List is an update of the MDI's 2009 review. Some grandfathered minerals had their status changed to approved afterwards, based on IMA approved reports. The list of approved minerals was revised with 'The New IMA List of Minerals (September 2012)'.
- The IMA was founded in a meeting in Madrid (1958). The CNMMN (now CNMNC) was one of the original eight commissions, it was founded in 1959. Not all grandfathered mineral were first described prior to 1959. Hatrurite, a phase in cement clinker (alite, C3S), was first described in 1977, for instance.
- Some mineral names were revised; this changed their first letters. Sodium-pharmacosiderite is now natropharmacosiderite, natroapophyllite is now fluorapophyllite-(Na), for instance. But 2010, hydroxylapatite, fluorapatite, fluorellestadite and chlorapatite had their old names reinstated.
- Progress in earth sciences, geology, mineralogy can be slow:
  - Some IMA/CNMNC (1959–2000) approved minerals had their complete description published only 2012: 'IMA1998-018' (fluornatromicrolite, published 2011), 'IMA1987-046a' (ferrolaueite, published 2012), 'IMA1978-064' (approval probably based on fake data), 'IMA1977-006' (whelanite, published 2012) and 'IMA1968-003' (discredited, 'IMA2008-B'). 'IMA1995-025' was listed as well, a mistake (natroglaucocerinite, published 1995).
  - The paper of Armbruster et al. (2006) misunderstood the naming rules and renamed a well established mineral name (hancockite). Hatert et al. (2013) modified the naming rules. and proposal IMA2015 s.p. was accepted, reverting the renaming.
  - Sample: bergenite was discredited as a barium bearing mineral variety of phosphuranylite (IMA1962 s.p., special procedure). So phosphuranylite was already a valid mineral, and it is listed in the Michael Fleischer's mineral list (1966). Both are listed as grandfathered minerals as they are not listed in the 'ARD List' (approved, revalidated and discredited minerals; 2004).
  - The review and approval of new mineral is straight forward most of the time, but there are exceptions. Proposal IMA2009-096 was not accepted, proposal IMA2009-096a was approved as fontarnauite (6.DA.60) in 2014. Proposal IMA1995-020 was not accepted, proposal IMA1995-020c was approved as jarandolite (6.CB.25).
  - Some valid names get discredited (in the broader sense).
    - Tohdite (hydrous alumina) was conditionally approved as 'IMA2004-051'. But the re-examination of the holotype material of akdalaite ((Al_{2}O_{3})_{5}·H_{2}O, 'IMA1969-002') from the Fersman Mineralogical Museum in Moscow showed that both minerals were identical (space group was corrected).
    - Tellurocanfieldite was conditionally approved as 'IMA2012-013'. Its approval was withdrawn as further studies showed it to be a Te-rich variety of canfieldite (Y: 1894, 2.BA.70).
- Some old minerals were known before their 20th century names were first published.

== Miscellany ==
- Current regulations do not allow a new mineral name to honour a person a second time. But there are exceptions: Jöns Jakob Berzelius (1779–1848) (berzelianite, berzeliite and berzeline (now haüyne)); Pierre Berthier (1782–1861) (berthierine and berthierite); Andor von Semsey (1833–1923) (andorite IV, andorite VI and semseyite); Brian Harold Mason (1917–2009) (brianite and stenhuggarite); Caleb Wroe Wolfe (1908–1980) (wolfeite and wroewolfeite) and Leo Neal Yedlin (1908–1977) (yedlinite and nealite). The regulation does not affect mineral series and other variations (prefix iso, hexa, ortho, tetra, clino, meta, para, pseudo etc.). For instance: Karl Hugo Strunz (1910–2006) (strunzite group); George P. Merrill (1854–1929) (merrillite series, whitlockite group); Edward S. Grew (Ph.D. 1971) (edgrewite series, humite group).
- Standard temperature and pressure (STP).
  - Silicate perovskites, argentite and β-quartz are not valid minerals, as they do not occur on Earth's surface (STP). The type material of bridgmanite is from a meteorite. Some minerals are unstable on Earth's surface (metastability): diamonds, cohenite and haxonite, for instance. Acanthite var. argentite (a pseudomorph after argentite) and β-quartz pseudomorphs are sometimes sold.
  - Ramdohr (1936) discovered that the type material of schapbachite (Ag_{0.4}Pb_{0.2}Bi_{0.4}S) was a mixture of galena (PbS) and matildite (AgBiS_{2}). It was discredited (1982) as it was found unstable at 'standard temperature and pressure' (STP). It was revalidated (2004) as Pb-bearing schabachite is stable at STP. The type locality is not Schapbach now, but Silberbrünnle mine, Gengenbach; both Black Forest localities.
  - Epsilon iron, hexagonal close-packed (HCP) phase of iron is stable only at extremely high pressure. It can be found as a mineral (chemical formula: (Fe,Os,Ru,Ir)).
- It is not only schapbachite that had a longer controversy. Other minerals have a complicated history, as well.
  - Imogolite, 9.ED.20, was first published 1962. Its formal discreditation by the IMA was published 1967, as its description was incomplete. The IMA referred it to the AIPEA (Association Internationale Pour l'Étude des Argiles) for advice and it was approved by the AIPEA (Nomenclature Committee) at its Tokyo meeting (1970). Fleischer (1983) described it as a variety of allophane and it was finally redefined and approved by the IMA/CNMNC 1986.
    - Amorphous allophane, nanotube-like imogolite (Al_{2}SiO_{3}(OH)_{4}), halloysite-10Å (Al_{2}Si_{2}O_{5}(OH)_{4}·2H_{2}O), halloysite-7Å (Al_{2}Si_{2}O_{5}(OH)_{4}) and gibbsite (Al(OH)_{3}) are thought to be products of tuff weathering.
  - Betalommosovite was described by Gerasimovskiy and Kazakova (1962) and discredited by the IMA-CNMMN (IMA1967 s.p.). It was published without approval and listed as discredited on the 'IMA/CNMNC List of Mineral Names' (2009). Later, betalomonosovite was revalidated (IMA2014-J).
  - Jichengite as xinghuaite (IMA1984-047) was rejected by the IMA-CNMMN. Jichengite (IMA1994-039) was rejected by the IMA-CNMMN, as well. Unfortunately, it was published without approval in 2011.
  - UM1991-//-COF:BaCaCe (IMA1989-012), a calcium analogue of cordylite-(Ce) from Bayan Obo mine, had the approval procedure suspended by Joseph A. Mandarino, because of the cerium dominant cordylite (IMA2000-C).
- Other curiosities:
  - Niggliite (former 1.AG.60, year: 1938), sorosite (former 1.AC.15, IMA1994-047), yuanjiangite (former 1.AC.15, IMA1993-028) are not classified as tin alloys (PGE-metal alloys and indium-tin family) in Fleischer's Glossary. But, they are stannide minerals (nickeline mineral group), sulfide mineral class there.
  - Tiragalloite (9.BJ.25, IMA1969-061, Mn^{2+}_{4}(HAsSi_{3}O_{13})), is an arsenosilicate and grenmarite (9.BE.25, IMA2003-024, (Na,Ca)_{4}(Mn,Na)(Zr,Mn)_{2}(Zr,Ti)(Si_{2}O_{7})_{2}(O,F)_{4}) is a zirconium silicate (analogous to the more common aluminosilicates, borosilicates and titanium silicates).
  - Mostly anthropogenic minerals: abhurite (3.DA.30), lausenite (7.CB.70), guildite (7.DC.30), hoelite (10.CA.15), calclacite (10.AA.25).
  - Studtite (4.GA.15, year: 1947) is the first peroxide mineral, the facies radioactivity generate peroxide.
  - Ianthinite (4.GA.10, year: 1926), U(IV) is one of the constituents of the mineral), it gets a layer of schoepite/ metaschoepite in the presence of oxygen.
  - Polyoxometalates:
    - Menezesite (4.FN.05, IMA2005-023) and aspedamite (IMA2011-056), are the only natural heteropolyniobates known.
    - Ophirite (IMA2013-017) is a mineral with a heteropolytungstate tri-lacunary keggin anion.
    - Melcherite (IMA2015-018) and peterandresenite (IMA2012-084) have a lindqvist anion.
  - Inosilicate, biopyriboles:
    - Jimthompsonite (IMA1977-011) is a triple chain inosilicate.
    - Chesterite (IMA1977-010) is a connected double chain inosilicate.
  - Inosilicate, double dreier chains:
    - Xonotlite (Y: 1866) is an inosilicate with double dreier chains.
    - Chivruaiite (IMA2004-052) is an inosilicate double dreier chains of (SiO_{4}) tetrahedra.
    - Zorite (IMA1972-011) is an inosilicate double dreier chains of (SiO_{4}) tetrahedra.
    - Haineaultite (IMA1997-015) is an inosilicate double dreier chains of (SiO_{4}) tetrahedra.
  - Other inosilicates:
    - Veblenite (IMA2010-050) has a veblenite ribbon (Si_{8}O_{22}).
    - Yangite (IMA2012-052) is an inosilicate with two-connected double chain.
    - Yegorovite (IMA2008-033) is an inosilicate with single zig-zag chains of Si tetrahedra.
  - Icosahedrite (IMA2010-042), the only natural quasicrystal known.
  - Comancheite (IMA2013-B/ IMA1980-077, former 3.DD.65) is a mercury nitride mineral now.
  - α-Sulfur (old); chemical formula unit with 1 atom; unit cell with 128 formula units (Z).
  - Whitecapsite (IMA2012-030), chemical formula: H_{16}Fe^{2+}_{5}Fe^{3+}_{14}Sb^{3+}_{6}(AsO_{4})_{18}O_{16}·120H_{2}O; unit cell with 1 formula unit (Z).
  - Megacyclite (9.CP.10, IMA1991-015); chemical formula unit with 111 atoms; unit cell with 4 formula units (Z).
  - Labyrinthite (9.CO.10, IMA2002-065); chemical formula unit with 278.5 atoms; unit cell with 3 formula units (Z).
  - Ashcroftine-(Y) (9.DN.15, year: 1933); chemical formula unit with 180 atoms; unit cell with 4 formula units (Z).

== Notes ==
Feldspar series

Phase diagram of Al_{2}SiO_{5}
(aluminosilicates).
- Attention with the amphiboles: some mineral names have been redefined (IMA2012 s.p. was the last revision), some even more than once; i.e. their chemical formula range changed. For example, aluminotaramite ('IMA2006-023', 9.DE.20) is a synonym of ferro-taramite, sodic-ferri-ferropedrizite (IMA2003 s.p., 9.DE.25) was renamed to ferro-ferri-pedrizite, ehimeite is a synonym of chromio-pargasite ('IMA2011-023', 9.DE.15), kôzulite is a synonym of mangano-arfvedsonite ('IMA1968-028', 9.DE.25) and kornite is a synonym of potassic-mangani-leakeite ('IMA1992-032', 9.DE.25).
- Some IMA-CNMNC approved minerals have a questionable status on mineralienatlas.de, but their unit cell parameters are given on mindat.org (or vice versa). Their status here doesn't change; it remains 'approved mineral'.
- The mineral systematic given on Nickel-Strunz (9 and 10 ed) is not controversial. Dmisteinbergite (feldspar, 9.EG.15), uranyl sorovanadates (4.HD. ids) and silica family (4.DA. ids) are some exceptions, for instance.
- Great care must be taken with definitions and their redefinitions. There is a difference between rocks, natural minerals and chemical compounds. Some examples: rocksalt (a redirect), halite and sodium chloride; kaolin earth (a redirect) and kaolinite; apatite, strict sense (chlorapatite, fluorapatite and hydroxylapatite), apatite group and apatite supergroup; kaolinite-serpentine group (alias serpentine), serpentine subgroup, serpentinization and serpentinite; olivine structural group (after rruff.nfo/ima); olivine group and olivine (a fosterite var.); spessartine (a garnet) and spessartite (a lamprophyre); iron (element), telluric iron (alias native iron) and meteoric iron; phyllosilicate minerals (alias sheet silicates) and clays; pyrochlore (invalid mineral name since 2010), pyrochlore group and pyrochlore supergroup; antimony and stibnite (alias antimonite); etc.
- The data of a mineral on the databases is similar but not equal. For instance:
  - Opal is a valid IMA/CNMNC name but it is a mineraloid (a mixture of cristobalite and/or tridymite and amorphous silica), it has a page on Mindat.org and Webmineral.com but not on the Handbook of Mineralogy.
    - Ice, mercury (low melting point); allophane, delvauxite, hisingerite (amorphous/ poorly crystalline); actinolite, augite, omphacite, sanidine (intermediate member of a solid solution series) are IMA/CNMNC valid names too. The reasons can be inherited pre-IMA status, practical reasons or entrenchment in the literature, including medical and legal usage.
  - Oligoclase^{I} is an albite variety on Mindat.org and it has pages on the Handbook of Minerals and Webmineral.com, see 'List of minerals (synonyms)' (plagioclase/albite-anorthite series). It is not the only intermediate member of a solid solution series with a page on the Handbook of Mineralogy (mineral varieties).
  - The Handbook of Mineralogy has pages on clinochrysotile, orthochrysotile and parachrysotile, but not on chrysotile; but they are polytypes of chrysotile, see 'List of minerals (synonyms)'.
  - Mindat.org uses to give the chemical formula of some minerals as a range (between parentheses, if tin dominant then herzenbergite: (Sn,Pb)SnS_{2}; otherwise teallite: (Pb,Sn)SnS_{2}), on the other side the IMA Database of Mineral Properties/ Rruff Project uses to give the ideal chemical formula of the solid solution end member (herzenbergite: SnS).
    - The given chemical names are a compromise for information purposes, being based on the Nickel-Strunz code too. Most of the time the chemical formula on rruff.info was used, sometimes the simpler one on mindat.org. To illustrate it: bartonite, K_{3}Fe_{10}S_{14} (mindat.org), K_{6}Fe_{20}S_{26}S (rruff.info); bayleyite, Mg_{2}(UO_{2})(CO_{3})_{3}·18H_{2}O (mindat.org), Mg_{2}(UO_{2})(CO_{3})_{3}(H_{2}O)_{12}·6H_{2}O (rruff.info) and bredigite, Ca_{7}Mg(SiO_{4})_{4} (mindat.org), CaCa_{13}Mg_{2}(SiO_{4})_{8} (rruff.info).
    - Caution with the chemical formula units of silicates and their "formula masses". Some molecules have a repeating unit, these might be chains, networks, polymers, and so the true molecule might be a multiple of the smallest repeating unit (the unit cell of a crystal is formed by repeating 'Z' times the chemical formula). Examples: wadsleyite (Mg_{2}SiO_{4}) a sorosilicate and high pressure polymorph of forsterite and ringwoodite; leucophanite (NaCaBeSi_{2}O_{6}F), but it has Nickel-Strunz identifier 9.DH.05 (inosilicates with 4-periodic single chains, Si_{4}O_{12}); clinoenstatite (MgSiO_{3}), but it has Nickel-Strunz identifier 9.DA.10 (inosilicates with 2-periodic single chains, Si_{2}O_{6}); scolecite (CaAl_{2}Si_{3}O_{10}·3H_{2}O), but it has Nickel-Strunz identifier 9.GA.05 (zeolites with T_{5}O_{10} units – the fibrous zeolites); mogánite (SiO_{2}), but it has Nickel-Strunz identifier 4.DA.20 (oxides with small cations: silica family).
- The existence in nature of some questionable/ doubtful minerals is very unlikely at all or at the type locality. For example, chloromagnesite^{Q} (Y: 1872, MgCl_{2}) 3.AB.20 and zinkosite^{Q} (Y: 1852, ZnSO_{4}) 7.AB.10.
- Some names are not names of minerals anymore, but names of a group of minerals:
  - Micas, biotite group. (Note: No Webmineral reference)
    - The IMA/CNMMN, Subcommittee on Nomenclature of the Micas (1998, 1999) has recommended that the name biotite be used for a series including phlogopite, siderophyllite, annite and eastonite.
  - Zeolites: chabazite group,; (Note: No Webmineral reference) dachiardite group,; (Note: No Handbook of Mineralogy reference) heulandite group. (Note: No Webmineral reference)
  - Pyrochlore supergroup:
    - The pyrochlore supergroup was revised in 2010. The update of the databases isn't complete, yet.
    - Groups: pyrochlore,; roméite,; betafite,; microlite,; elsmoreite.

== Nomenclature dictionary ==
Special minerals (relaxed sense)

- Native elements (class 1): carbides, silicides, nitrides, phosphides, elements, alloys, amalgams
- Special minerals (strict sense): tellurium(VI) oxysalts ([Te^{6+}O_{x}], trioxotellurate(IV) tetraoxotellurate(VI) [Te^{4+}O_{3}][Te^{6+}O_{4}])

"Ore" minerals (sulfides and oxides)

- Sulfide class (class 2): sulfides [S], selenides [Se], tellurides [Te], arsenides [As], antimonides [Sb], bismuthides [Bi], sulfantimonides [Sb_{x}S_{y}], sulfarsenides [As_{x}S_{y}], sulfbismuthides [Bi_{x}S_{y}], sulfastannides [Sn_{x}S_{y}], plumboarsenide [As,Pb], plumbobismuthide [Bi,Pb]
- Oxide class (class 4): sulfites(IV) [SO_{3}]^{2−}, selenites(IV) [SeO_{3}]^{2−}, iodates [IO_{3}], trioxotellurate(IV) [Te^{4+}O_{3}]^{2−}, dihydroxotellurate(IV) [Te^{4+}O(OH)_{2}], pentaoxoditellurate(IV) [(Te^{4+})_{2}O_{5}]^{2−}, vanadyl anion [V^{4+}O_{2}]^{2-}

Evaporite and similar minerals

- Halide class (class 3): fluoride [F], chloride [Cl], bromide [Br], iodide [I], tetrafluoroborates [BF_{4}], hexafluorosilicates [SiF_{6}], hexachlorothallate(III) [Tl^{3+}Cl_{6}]
- Carbonate and nitrate class (class 5): carbonates [CO_{3}], bicarbonate [HCO_{3}]
  - Nitrates (subclass 5.N): nitrates [NO_{3}]
- Borate class (class 6): metaborates [B_{2}O_{4}], trioxoborate [BO_{3}], tetrahydroborate [B(OH)_{4}]

Mineral structures with a tetrahedral unit, monomeric minerals

- Sulfate class (class 7), monomeric minerals: sulfates [SO_{4}]^{2−}, tungstates [WO_{4}]^{2−}, niobates [NbO_{4}]^{2−}, molybdates [MoO_{4}]^{2−}, chromates [CrO_{4}]^{2−}, tetraoxotantalate [TaO_{4}], thiosulphates [SO_{3}S]^{2−}
- Phosphate class (class 8), monomeric minerals: phosphates(V) [PO_{4}]^{3−}, arsenates(V) [AsO_{4}]^{3−}, vanadates(V) [VO_{4}]^{3−}, hydroxophosphates(V) [PO_{3}OH]^{2−}, dihydroxophosphates(V) [PO_{2}(OH)_{2}], hydroxoarsenates(V) [AsO_{3}OH]^{2−}, dihydroxoarsenates(V) [AsO_{2}(OH)_{2}]
- Nesosilicates (subclass 9.A), monomeric minerals: tetraoxosilicate [SiO_{4}], hydrotrioxosilicate [SiO_{3}OH]

Mineral structures with a tetrahedral unit, di- and chain silicates

- Sorosilicates (subclass 9.B): heptaoxodisilicate [Si_{2}O_{7}], hydrohexaoxodisilicate [Si_{2}O_{6}OH], tetraoxosilicate heptaoxodisilicate [SiO_{4}][Si_{2}O_{7}], decaoxotrisilicate [Si_{3}O_{10}], undecaoxotetrasilicate [Si_{4}O_{11}]
- Inosilicates (subclass 9.D):
  - Single-chain inosilicates: pyroxenes
  - Double-chain inosilicates: amphiboles
  - Other inosilicates:

Mineral structures with a tetrahedral unit, framework silicates

- Cyclosilicates (subclass 9.C):
- Phyllosilicates (subclass 9.E):
- Tridimensional silicate frameworks: tectosilicates (subclass 9.F)
  - Silica family (class 4, family DA): dioxosilicate [SiO_{2}]
- Tectosilicates, zeolites (subclass 9.G):

Mineral structures with a tetrahedral unit, other cases

- Dimeric and polymeric minerals, phosphate and sulfate class: polyphosphates, polyoxometalates, hexaniobates [Nb_{6}O_{19}], pyrophosphates [P_{2}O_{7}], pyroarsenates [As_{2}O_{7}], decavanadates [V_{10}O_{28}]

Other cases (relaxed sense)

- Organic minerals, salts of organic acids (class 10, division A): oxalates, citrates, acetates, formiate
- Cations: divalent [dimercury] [Hg_{2}]^{2+}, uranyl [U^{6+}O_{2}]^{2+}, ammonium [NH_{4}]^{+}, tetramethylammonium [N(CH_{3})_{4}]^{+}
- Other building blocks: stannide alloys [Sn], aluminide alloys [Al], aluminosilicates, borosilicates, aluminoborosilicates, paddlewheel cluster [e.g.: uranyl-tricarbonate cluster (UO_{2})(CO_{3})_{3}]

== Gallery ==
Halite/ hydrohalite phase diagram

Ternary phase diagram: anorthite (CaAl_{2}Si_{2}O_{8}), wollastonite (CaSiO_{3}) and titanite (CaTiSiO_{5})

Sulfur/ β-sulfur diagram, rosickyite turns slowly to α-sulfur at room temperature

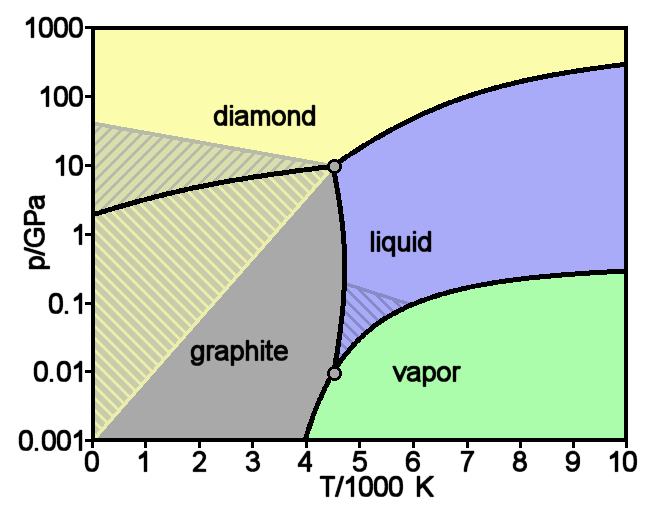
Theoretically predicted phase diagram of carbon

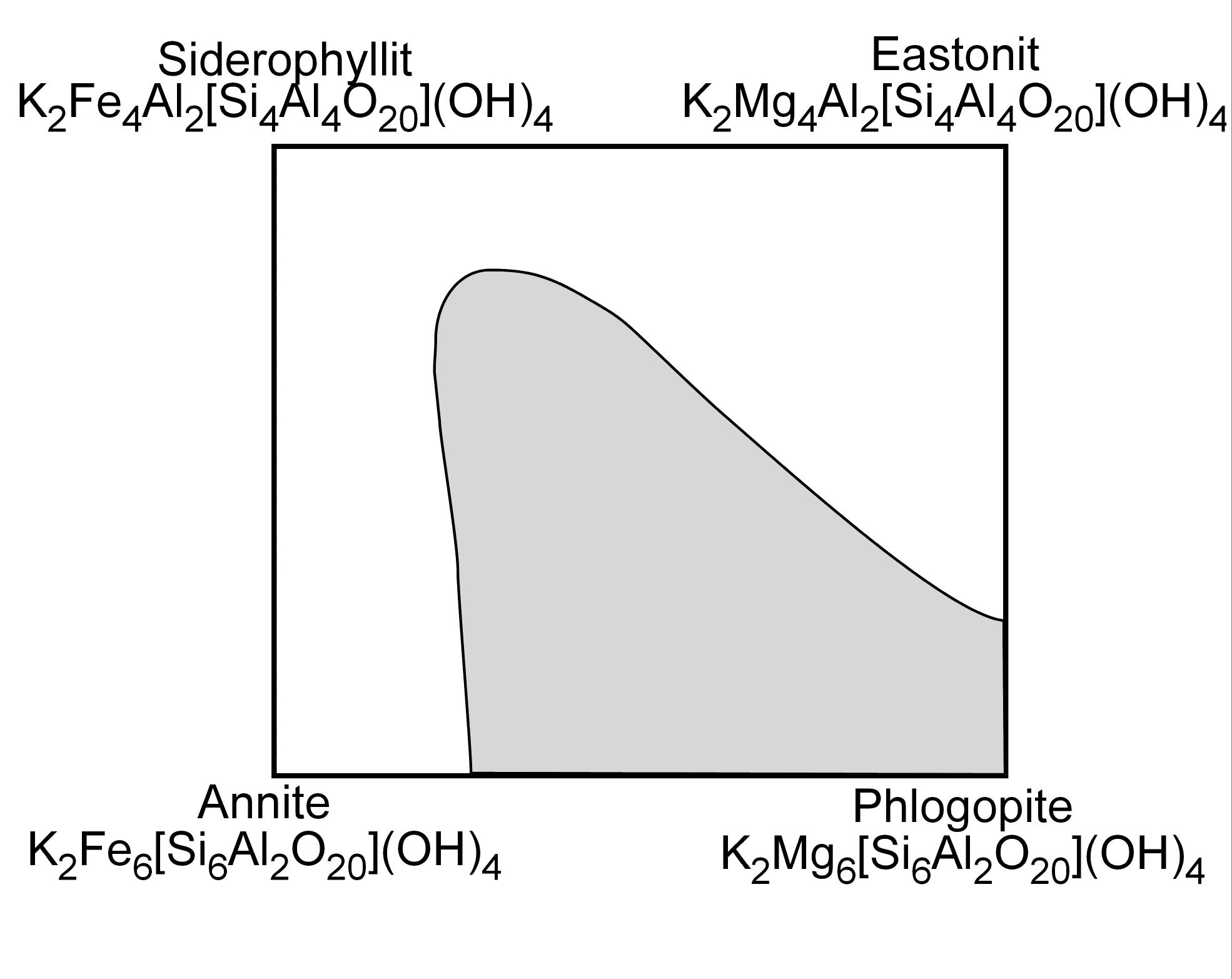
Biotite series (micas)

== See also ==
- Classification of minerals - Non silicates
- Classification of minerals - Silicates
- Geology
- List of critical mineral raw materials
- List of minerals
- List of minerals (synonyms)
- List of rock types
- Mineralogy
- Mineraloid
- Rock

== Notes ==
=== References ===
- Web: rruff.info/ima/, 'IMA database of mineral properties' switchboard:
  - 'Not an IMA approved mineral' tag – E.g. buserite
  - 'Discredited' mineral tag – E.g. bindheimite
  - 'Pending publication' tag – E.g. drobecite (IMA 2002-034)
  - 'Questionable mineral species' tag – E.g. shubnikovite
