= List of minerals recognized by the International Mineralogical Association (L) =

This list includes those recognised minerals beginning with the letter L. The International Mineralogical Association is the international group that recognises new minerals and new mineral names; however, minerals discovered before 1959 did not go through the official naming procedure, although some minerals published previously have been either confirmed or discredited since that date. This list contains a mixture of mineral names that have been approved since 1959 and those mineral names believed to still refer to valid mineral species (these are called "grandfathered" species).

The list is divided into groups:

- Introduction • (Main synonyms)
- A • B • C • D • E • F • G • H • I • J • K • L • M • N • O • P–Q • R • S • T • U–V • W–X • Y–Z

The data was exported from mindat.org on 29 April 2005; updated up to 'IMA2021'.

The minerals are sorted by name, followed by the structural group (rruff.info/ima and ima-cnmnc by mineralienatlas.de, mainly) or chemical class (mindat.org and basics), the year of publication (if it's before of an IMA approval procedure), the IMA approval and the Strunz-mindat code. The first link is to mindat.org, the second link is to webmineral.com, and the third is to the Handbook of Mineralogy (Mineralogical Society of America).

- Abbreviations:
  - ^{D} – discredited (IMA/CNMNC status).
  - ^{Q} – questionable/ doubtful (IMA/CNMNC, mindat.org or mineralienatlas.de status).
  - ^{N} – published without approval of the IMA/CNMNC, or just not an IMA approved mineral but with some acceptance in the scientific community nowadays.
  - ^{I} – intermediate member of a solid-solution series.
  - ^{H} – hypothetical mineral (synthetic, anthropogenic, suspended approval procedure, etc.)
    - ^{ch} – incomplete description, hypothetical solid solution end member.
  - Rd – redefinition of ...
  - "s.p." – special procedure.
  - group – a name used to designate a group of species, sometimes only a mineral group name.
  - no – no link available.
  - IUPAC – chemical name.
  - Y: NNNN – year of publication.
  - Y: old – known before publications were available.

== L ==
=== La – Le ===
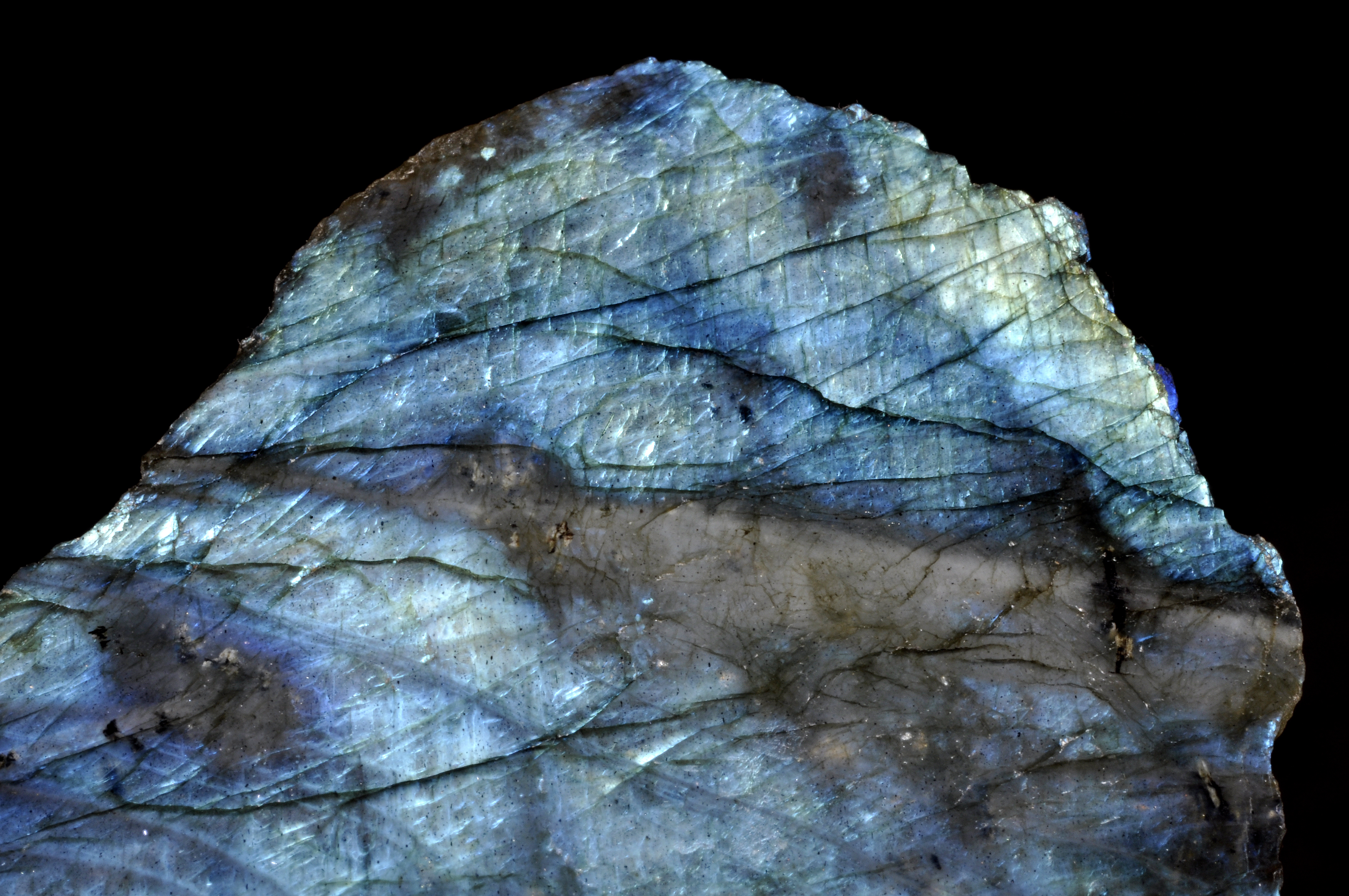
Polished labradorite from Madagascar

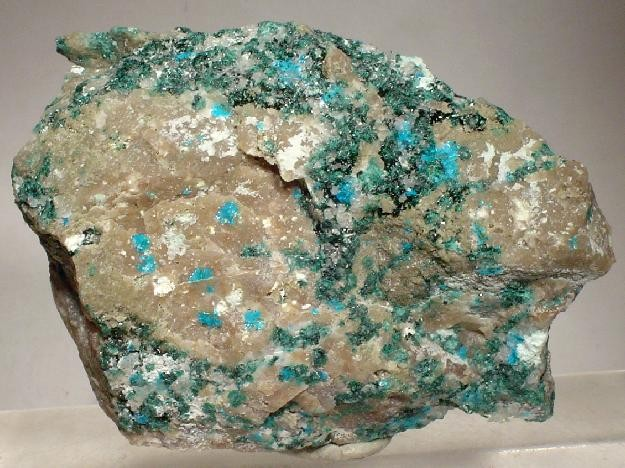
Lammerite (dark green) and lavendulan (turquoise-blue), two rare copper arsenates from El Guanaco mine, Antofagasta Province, Chile; size 5.0 × 3.6 × 2.6 cm

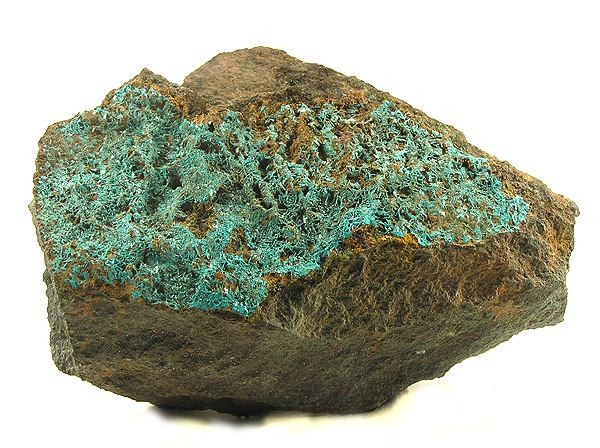
Langite from the Grandfontaine-les-Minières Mine, Schirmeck, Bruche valley, Bas-Rhin, Alsace, France

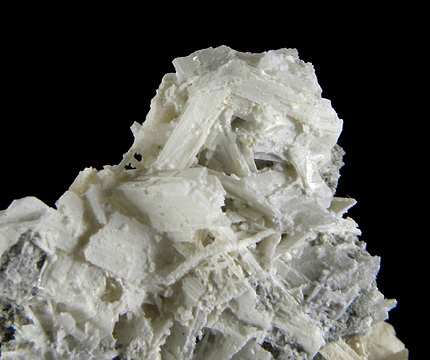
Latiumite, a rare phyllosilicate, from Cava di Campagnano, Campagnano di Roma, Italy; size 4.6 × 3.8 × 2.8 cm

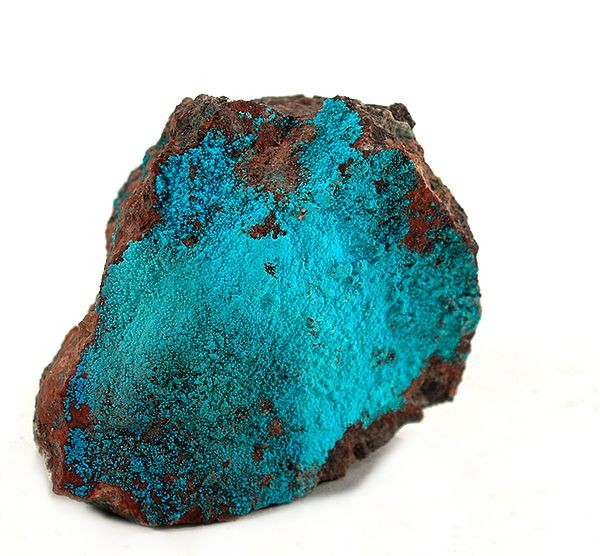
Lavendulan, an uncommon copper arsenate from the Meskani Mine, Isfahan province, Iran; size 3.9 × 3.5 × 2.6 cm

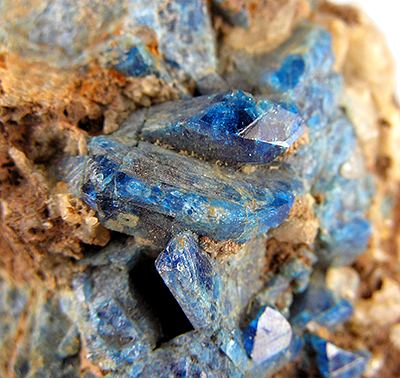
Lazulite, Färbergraben, Werfen, Austria; largest crystal is about 1.2 cm

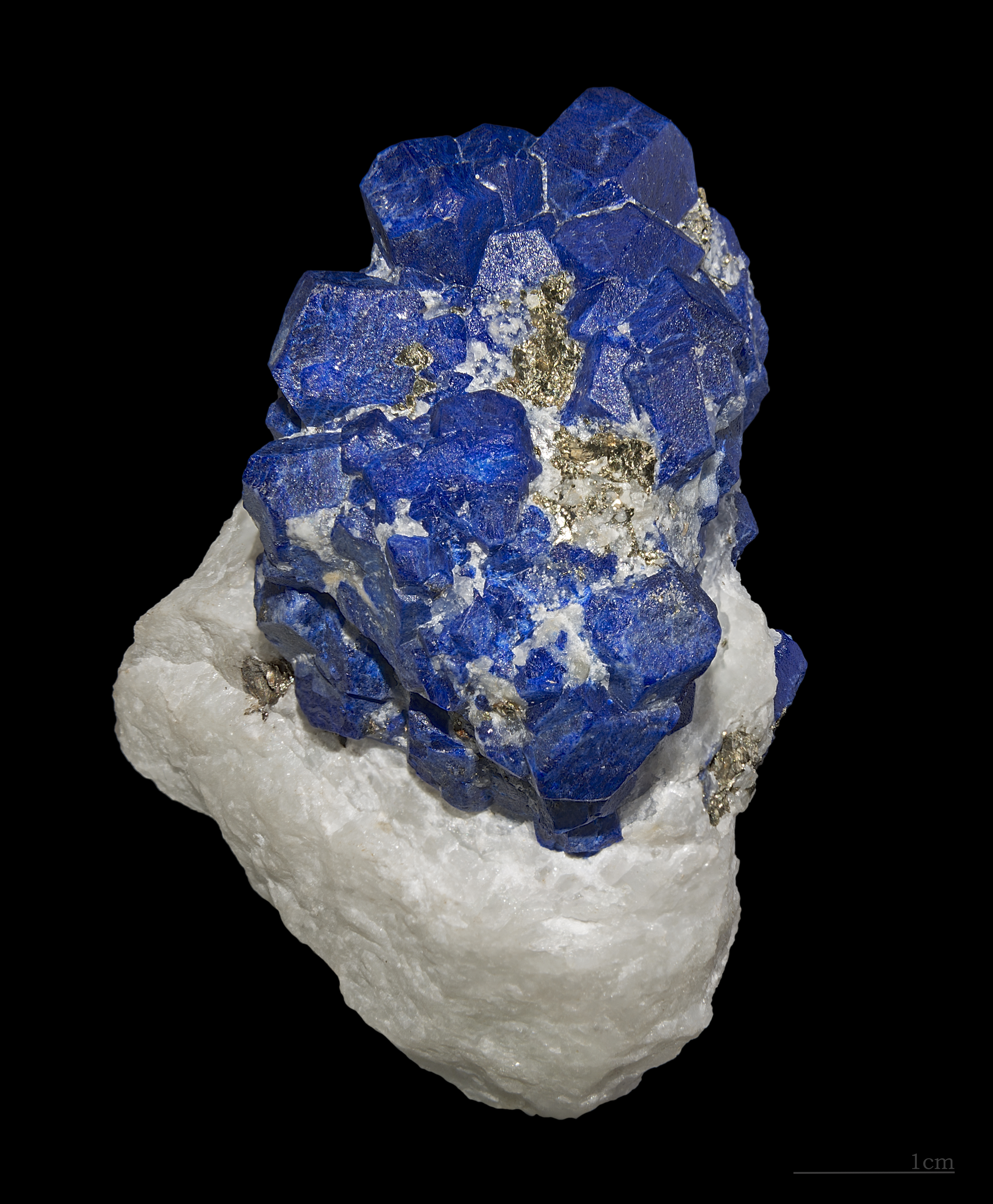
Lazurite on marble, Sar-e-Sang District, Badakhshan, Afghanistan

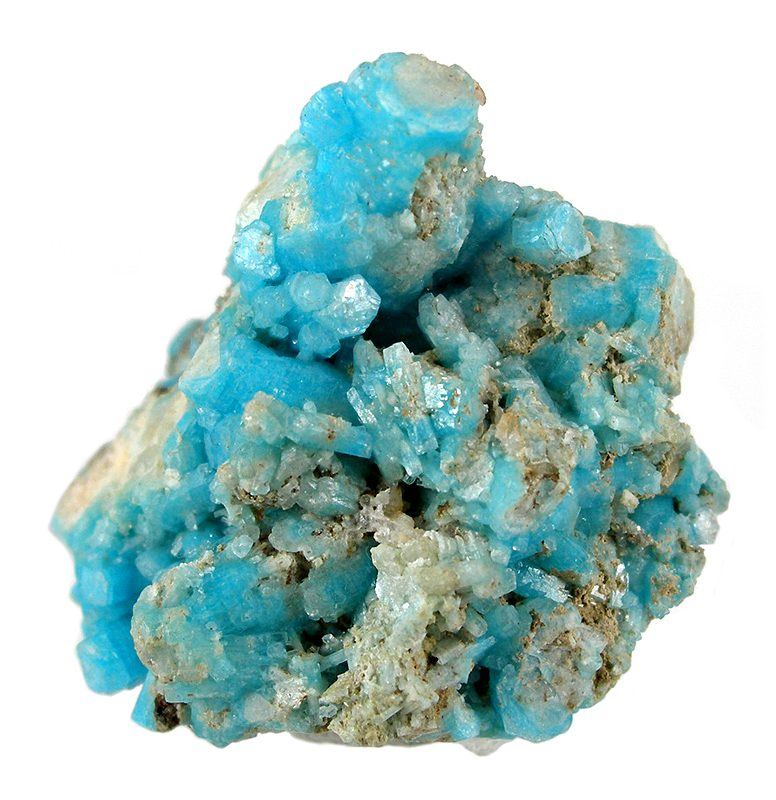
Leadhillite, Mammoth-St. Anthony Mine, Tiger, Arizona; size: 3.2 × 3.1 × 2.1 cm

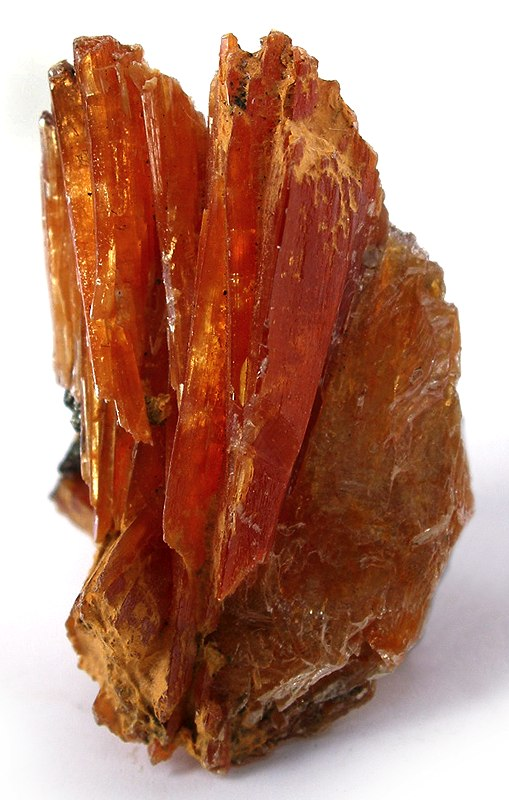
Leiteite, a zinc arsenate, colored umber-red by inclusions of ludlockite, a lead arsenate. Tsumeb, Namibia; size: 2.8 × 1.8 × 1.2 cm

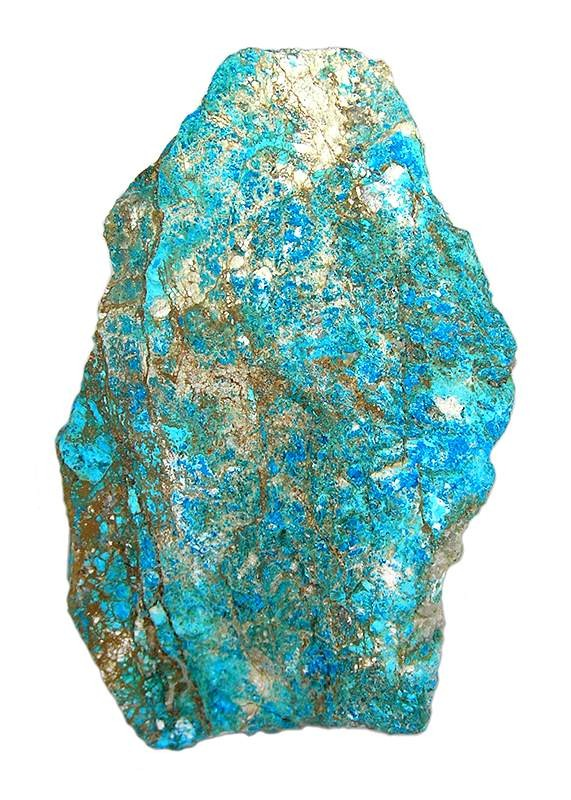
Lemanskiite, a copper arsenate, Abundancia Mine, Antofagasta Province, Chile; size: 6.3 × 3.3 × 3.1 cm

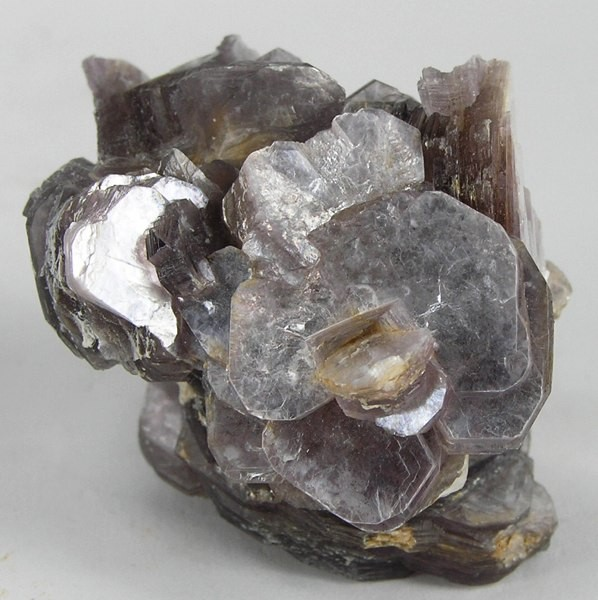
Lavender lepidolite from the Himalaya Mine, Mesa Grande District, San Diego County, California, US; size: 4.8 x 3.9 x 3.5 cm

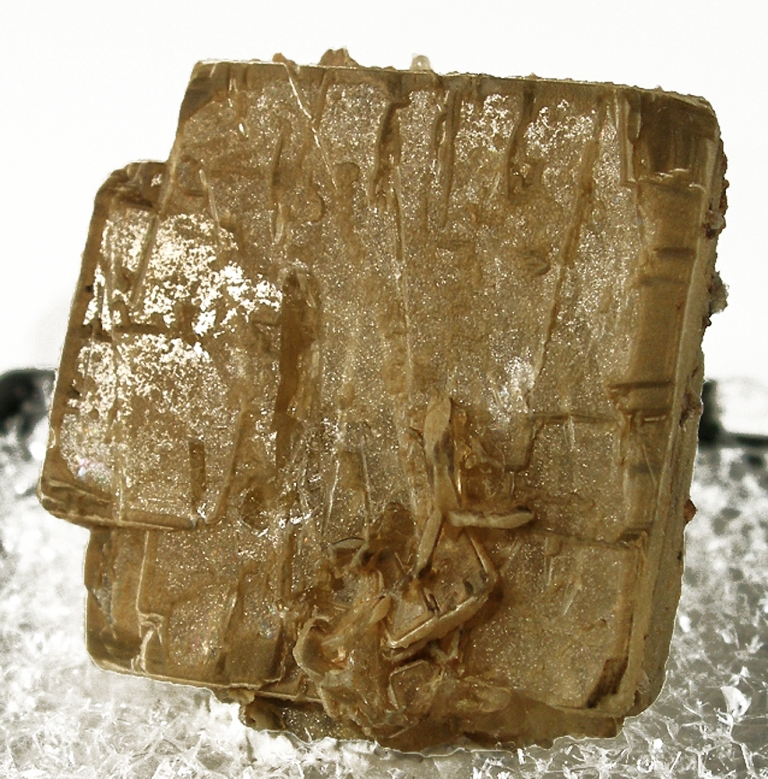
Leucophanite, large crystal from Mont Saint-Hilaire, Quebec; size: 2.1 cm x 2.1 cm x 0.8 cm

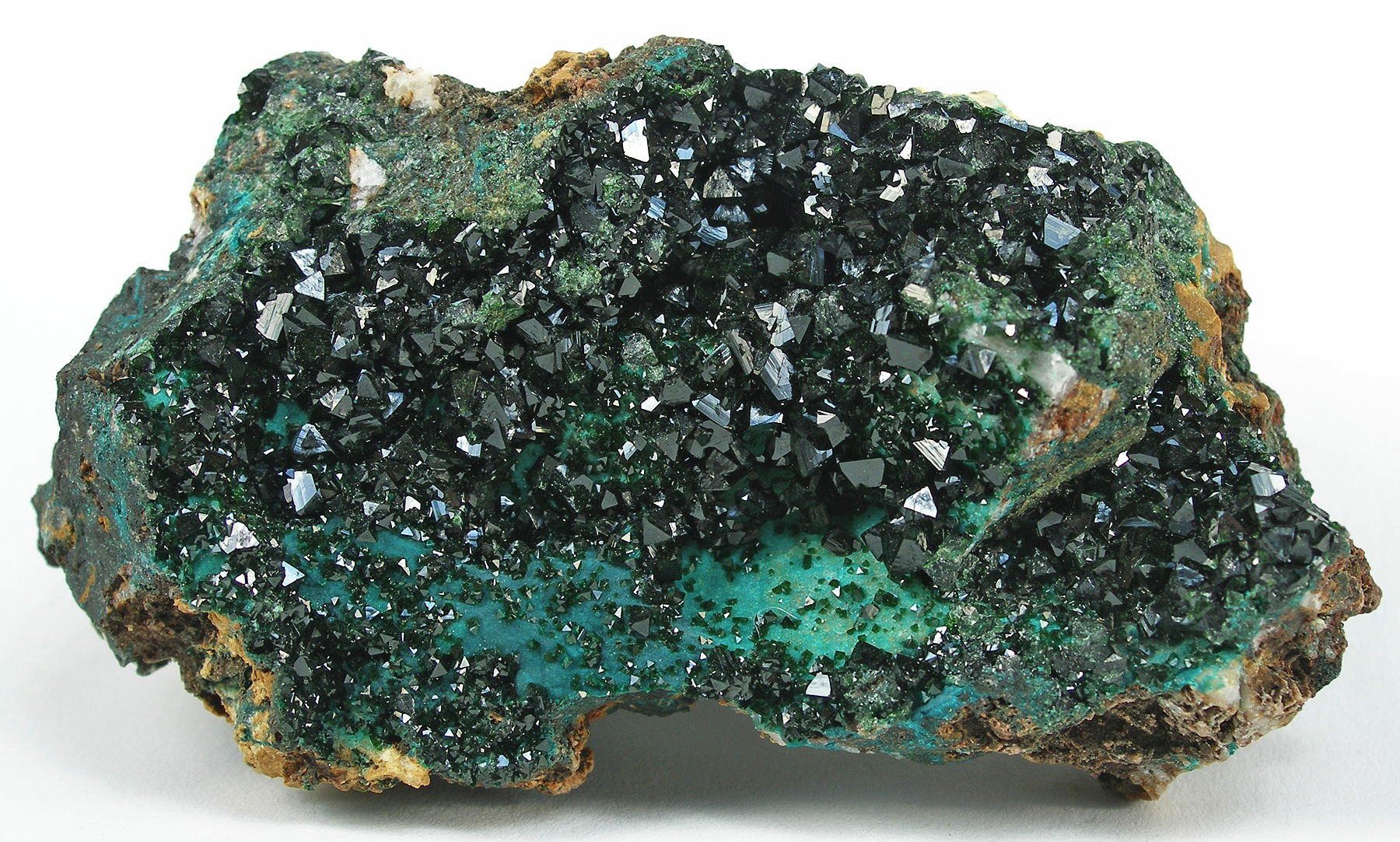
Libethenite from Kambove, Central area, Katanga Copper Crescent, Katanga, Democratic Republic of Congo

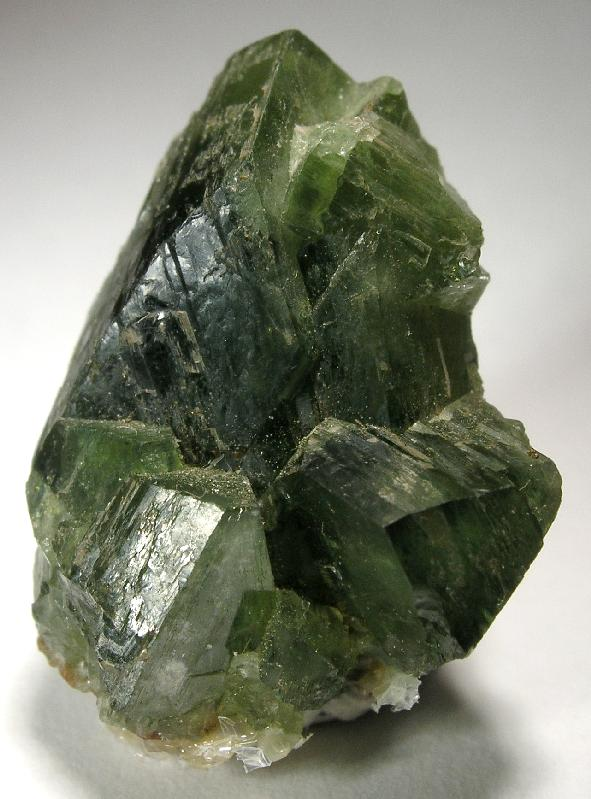
Ludlamite from the Blackbird Mine, Blackbird District, Lemhi County, Idaho, USA

1. Laachite (zirconolite: IMA2012-100) 4.0 [no]
  ((Ca,Mn)_{2}Zr_{2}Nb_{2}TiFeO_{14})
2. Labuntsovite (labuntsovite) 9.CE.30e
  1. Labuntsovite-Fe (IMA1998-051a) 9.CE.30e [no]
  2. Labuntsovite-Mg (IMA1998-050a) 9.CE.30e [no]
  3. Labuntsovite-Mn (IMA2000 s.p., 1955) 9.CE.30e [no]
3. Labyrinthite (eudialyte: IMA2002-065) 9.CO.10
4. Lacroixite (titanite: 1914) 8.BH.10
  (IUPAC: sodium aluminium fluoro phosphate)
5. Laffittite (IMA1973-031) 2.GA.35
  (IUPAC: silver mercury arsenide trisulfide)
6. Laflammeite (IMA2000-014) 2.BC.60
  (IUPAC: tripalladium dilead disulfide)
7. Laforêtite (chalcopyrite: IMA1995-006) 2.CB.10a
  (IUPAC: silver indium disulfide)
8. Lafossaite (IMA2003-032) 3.AA.25
  (IUPAC: thallium chloride)
9. Lagalyite (IMA2016-106) 4.0 [no] [no]
10. Lahnsteinite (ktenasite: IMA2012-002) 7.0 [no]
  (IUPAC: tetrazinc hexahydro sulfate trihydrate)
11. Laihunite (IMA1988-xxx, 1976) 9.AC.05
12. Laitakarite (tetradymite: IMA1967 s.p., 1959) 2.DC.05
  (IUPAC: tetrabismuth triselenide)
13. Lakargiite (oxide perovskite: IMA2007-014) 4.CC.30 [no]
  (IUPAC: calcium zirconium trioxide)
14. Lakebogaite (IMA2007-001) 8.EA.20 [no]
15. Lalondeite (gyrolite: IMA2002-026) 9.EE.85
16. Lammerite (IMA1980-016) 8.AB.30
  (IUPAC: tricopper diarsenate)
17. Lamprophyllite (seidozerite, lamprophyllite: 1894) 9.BE.25 [no] [no]
  (IUPAC: trisodium (strontium sodium) trititanium heptaoxodisilicate dioxidedihydroxyl)
18. Lanarkite (Y: 1832) 7.BD.40
  (IUPAC: dilead oxide sulfate)
19. Landauite (crichtonite: IMA1965-033) 4.CC.40
20. Landesite (reddingite: IMA1964 s.p., 1930 Rd) 8.CC.05
  (IUPAC: nonamanganese(II) triiron(III) trihydro octaphosphate nonahydrate)
21. Långbanite (IMA1971 s.p., 1888) 9.AG.10
22. Långbanshyttanite (IMA2010-071) 8.0 [no] [no]
  (IUPAC: dilead dimanganese magnesium tetrahydro diarsenate hexahydrate)
23. Langbeinite (langbeinite: 1891) 7.AC.10
  (IUPAC: dipotassium dimagnesium trisulfate)
24. Langhofite (IMA2019-005) 7.0 [no] [no]
25. Langisite (nickeline: IMA1968-023) 2.CC.05
  (IUPAC: cobalt arsenide)
26. Langite (Y: 1864) 7.DD.10
  (IUPAC: tetracopper hexahydro sulfate dihydrate)
27. Lanmuchangite (alum: IMA2001-018) 7.CC.20
  (IUPAC: thallium aluminium disulfate dodecahydrate)
28. Lannonite (IMA1979-069) 7.DF.40
29. Lansfordite (Y: 1888) 5.CA.10
  (IUPAC: magnesium carbonate pentahydrate)
30. Lanthanite (lanthanite) 5.CC.25
  (IUPAC: diREE tricarbonate octahydrate)
  1. Lanthanite-(Ce) (IMA1983-055) 5.CC.25
  2. Lanthanite-(La) (IMA1987 s.p., 1845) 5.CC.25
  3. Lanthanite-(Nd) (IMA1979-074) 5.CC.25
31. Lapeyreite (IMA2003-023b) 8.0 [no]
  (IUPAC: tricopper oxydi(hydroxoarsenate) monohydrate)
32. Laphamite (orpiment: IMA1985-021) 2.FA.30
  (IUPAC: diarsenic triselenide)
33. Lapieite (IMA1983-002) 2.GA.25
  (IUPAC: copper nickel antimonide trisulfide)
34. Laplandite-(Ce) (IMA1974-005) 9.DJ.10
35. Laptevite-(Ce) (IMA2011-081) 9.0 [no]
36. Larderellite (larderellite: 1854) 6.EB.05
37. Larisaite (IMA2002-061) 4.JH.25
38. Larnite (Y: 1929) 9.AD.05
  (IUPAC: β-dicalcium (tetraoxy silicate))
39. Larosite (IMA1971-014) 2.LB.35
  ((Cu,Ag)_{21}PbBiS_{13})
40. Larsenite (Y: 1928) 9.AB.10
  (IUPAC: lead zinc (tetraoxy silicate))
41. Lasalite (lasalite: IMA2007-005) 4.HC.05
42. Lasnierite (IMA2017-084) 8.0 [no] [no]
43. Latiumite (latiumite: 1953) 9.EG.45
44. Latrappite (double perovskite: IMA1964-019) 4.CC.30
45. Laueite (laueite, laueite: 1954) 8.DC.30
  (IUPAC: manganese(II) diiron(III) dihydro diphosphate octahydrate)
46. Laumontite (zeolitic tectosilicate: IMA1997 s.p., 1805) 9.GB.10
47. Launayite (madocite: IMA1966-021) 2.LB.30
  (CuPb_{10}(Sb,As)_{13}S_{20})
48. Lauraniite (IMA2019-049) 7.0 [no] [no]
49. Laurelite (IMA1988-020a) 3.DC.20
  (IUPAC: heptalead dodecafluoride dichloride)
50. Laurentianite (IMA2010-018) 9.0 [no]
51. Laurentthomasite (milarite: IMA2018-157) 9.0 [no] [no]
52. Laurionite (Y: 1887) 3.DC.05
  (IUPAC: lead hydro chloride)
53. Laurite (pyrite: 1866) 2.EB.05a
  (IUPAC: ruthenium disulfide)
54. Lausenite (Y: 1928) 7.CB.70
  (IUPAC: diiron(III) trisulfate pentahydrate)
55. Lautarite (Y: 1891) 4.KA.05
  (IUPAC: calcium diiodate)
56. Lautenthalite (devilline: IMA1983-029) 7.DE.70
  (IUPAC: lead tetracopper hexahydro disulfate trihydrate)
57. Lautite (Y: 1881) 2.CB.40
  (IUPAC: copper arsenide sulfide)
58. Lavendulan (lavendulan: 1837) 8.DG.05
  (IUPAC: sodium calcium pentacopper chloro tetrarsenate pentahydrate)
59. Låvenite (wöhlerite: 1884) 9.BE.17
60. Laverovite (astrophyllite: IMA2017-009b) 9.DC. [no] [no]
61. Lavinskyite (plancheite: IMA2012-028) 9.0 [no] [no]
  (K(LiCu)Cu_{6}(Si_{4}O_{11})_{2}(OH)_{4})
62. Lavoisierite (ardennite: IMA2012-009) 9.0 [no]
63. Lavrentievite (IMA1984-020) 2.FC.15a
  (IUPAC: trimercury dichloro disulfide)
64. Lawrencite (Y: 1845) 3.AB.20
  (IUPAC: iron(II) dichloride)
65. Lawsonbauerite (IMA1979-004) 7.DD.40
  (IUPAC: nonamanganese(II) tetrazinc docosahydro disulfate octahydrate)
66. Lawsonite (lawsonite: 1895) 9.BE.05
  (IUPAC: calcium dialuminium (heptaoxy disilicate) dihydroxyl monohydrate)
67. Lazaraskeite (IMA2018-137) 10.0 [no] [no]
  (IUPAC: bis(glycolato)copper(II))
68. Lazarenkoite (IMA1980-076) 4.JC.10
  (IUPAC: calcium iron(III) triarsenic(III) heptaoxide trihydrate)
69. Lazaridisite (IMA2012-043) 7.0 [no] [no]
  (IUPAC: tri(cadmium sulfate) tetrahydrate)
70. Lazulite (IMA1967 s.p., 1795) 8.BB.40
  (IUPAC: magnesium dialuminium dihydro diphosphate)
71. Lazurite (IMA20-H, 1891) 9.FB.10
  Note: all known lazurites seem to be a variety of haüyne (Moore & Woodside, 2014)
72. Lead (19th century for native lead, probably) 1.AA.05
73. Leadamalgam (amalgam: IMA1981-042) 1.AD.30
  (IUPAC: mercury dilead amalgam)
74. Leadhillite (Y: 1832) 5.BF.40
  (IUPAC: tetralead dihydro sulfate dicarbonate)
75. Lechatelierite (a mineraloid)
76. Lecontite (Y: 1858) 7.CD.15
  (IUPAC: ammonium sodium sulfate dihydrate)
77. Lecoqite-(Y) (IMA2008-069) 5.0 [no]
  (IUPAC: sodium yttrium carbonate hexahydrate)
78. Leesite (IMA2016-064) 4.0 [no] [no]
79. Lefontite (IMA2014-075) 8.0 [no] [no]
  (IUPAC: diiron dialuminium beryllium hexahydro diphosphate)
80. Legrandite (Y: 1932) 8.DC.10
  (IUPAC: dizinc hydro arsenate monohydrate)
81. Leguernite (IMA2013-051) 7.A0. [no] [no]
  (Bi_{12.67}O_{14}(SO_{4})_{5})
82. Lehmannite (arsmirandite: IMA2017-057a) 8.0 [no] [no]
83. Lehnerite (8.EB.10: IMA1986-032) 8.EB.10
  (IUPAC: manganese(II) diuranyl diphosphate octahydrate)
84. Leifite (leifite: IMA2002 s.p., 1915 Rd) 9.EH.25
85. Leightonite (Y: 1938) 7.CC.70
  (IUPAC: dipotassium dicalcium copper tetrasulfate dihydrate)
86. Leisingite (tellurium oxysalt: IMA1995-011) 4.FL.65
  (IUPAC: copper dimagnesium tellurium(VI) hexaoxide hexahydrate)
87. Leiteite (IMA1976-026) 4.JA.05
  (IUPAC: zinc diarsenic(III) tetraoxide)
88. Lemanskiite (IMA1999-037) 8.DG.05
  (IUPAC: sodium calcium pentacopper chloro tetrarsenate pentahydrate)
89. Lemmleinite (labuntsovite) 9.CE.30d
  1. Lemmleinite-Ba (IMA1998-052a) 9.CE.30d [no]
  2. Lemmleinite-K (IMA1997-003) 9.CE.30d [no]
90. Lemoynite (lemoynite: IMA1968-013) 9.DP.35
91. Lenaite (chalcopyrite: IMA1994-008) 2.CB.10a
  (IUPAC: silver iron disulfide)
92. Lengenbachite (cylindrite: 1905) 2.HF.30
  (Ag_{4}Cu_{2}Pb_{18}As_{12}S_{39})
93. Leningradite (IMA1988-014) 8.BH.65
  (IUPAC: lead tricopper dichloro divanadate)
94. Lennilenapeite (stilpnomelane: IMA1982-085) 9.EG.40
95. Lenoblite (IMA1970-002) 4.HG.60
  (IUPAC: divanadium(IV) tetraoxide dihydrate)
96. Leogangite (IMA1998-032) 8.CC.15
  (IUPAC: decacopper tetrarsenate hexahydro tetrasulfate octahydrate)
97. Leonardsenite (weberite: IMA2011-059) 3.0 [no]
  (IUPAC: magnesium aluminium pentafluoride dihydrate)
98. Leonite (Y: 1896) 7.CC.55
  (IUPAC: dipotassium magnesium disulfate tetrahydrate)
99. Leoszilardite (IMA2015-128) 5.0 [no] [no]
  (IUPAC: hexasodium magnesium diuranyl hexacarbonate hexahydrate)
100. Lepageite (arsenite-antimonite: IMA2018-028) 4.0 [no] [no]
101. Lepersonnite 5.EG.10
  1. Lepersonnite-(Gd) (IMA1981-036) 5.EG.10
  2. Lepersonnite-(Nd) (IMA2021-066) 5.EG.10 [no] [no]
102. Lepidocrocite (lepidocrocite: IMA1980 s.p., 1944) 4.FE.15
  (IUPAC: hydro γ-iron(III) oxide)
103. (Lepidolite, mica series (Y: 1905) 9.EC.20 )
  Note: polylithionite-trilithionite series.
104. Lepkhenelmite-Zn (labuntsovite: IMA2003-003) 9.CE.30c
105. Lermontovite (Y: 1957) 8.DN.15
  (IUPAC: uranium(IV) hydro phosphate monohydrate)
106. Letovicite (Y: 1932) 7.AD.20
  (IUPAC: triammonium sulfate hydrogen sulfate)
107. Leucite (zeolitic tectosilicate: IMA1997 s.p., 1791) 9.GB.05
108. Leucophanite (Y: 1842) 9.DH.05
109. Leucophoenicite (humite: 1899) 9.AF.60
  (IUPAC: heptamanganese(II) tri(tetraoxy silicate) dihydroxyl)
110. Leucophosphite (Y: 1932) 8.DH.10
  (IUPAC: potassium diiron(III) hydro diphosphate dihydrate)
111. Leucosphenite (Y: 1901) 9.DP.15
112. Leucostaurite (hilgardite: IMA2007-047) 6.EA.05 [no] [no]
113. Levantite (latiumite: IMA2017-010) 9.0 [no] [no]
114. Leverettite (atacamite: IMA2013-011) 3.0 [no] [no]
  (IUPAC: tricopper cobalt dichloride hexahydroxide)
115. Levinsonite-(Y) (sulfate-oxalate: IMA1996-057) 10.AB.70
116. Lévyclaudite (cylindrite: IMA1989-034) 2.HF.25a
  (Pb_{8}Cu_{3}Sn_{7}(Bi,Sb)_{3}S_{28})
117. Lévyne (zeolitic tectosilicate) 9.GD.15
  1. Lévyne-Ca (IMA1997 s.p., 1825) 9.GD.15
  2. Lévyne-Na (IMA1997 s.p.) 9.GD.15 [no]
118. Leydetite (leydetite: IMA2012-065) 7.0 [no] [no]
  (IUPAC: iron uranyl disulfate undecahydrate)

=== Li – Ly ===
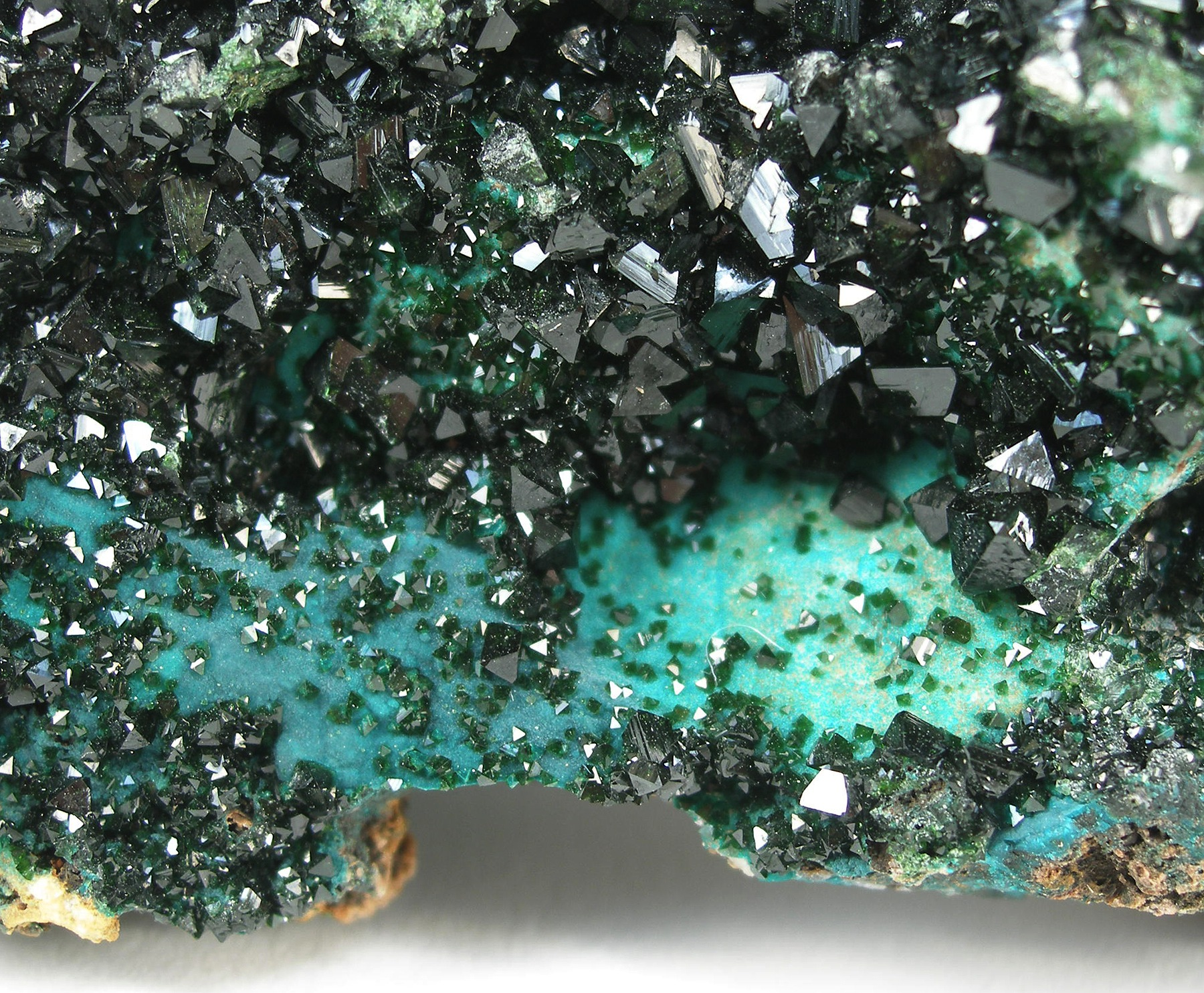
Libethenite crystals to 3 mm, Kambove, Haut-Katanga District, Democratic Republic of Congo

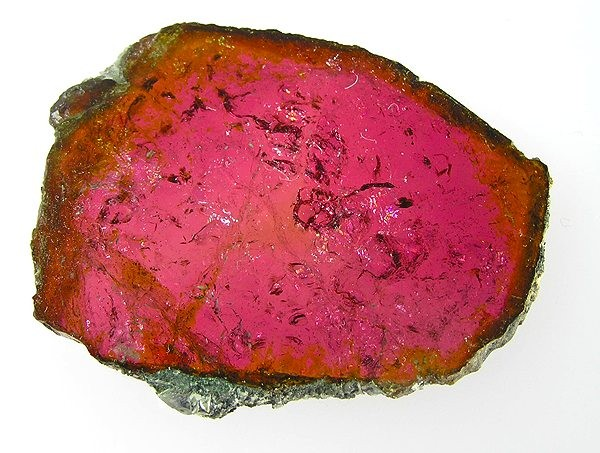
Liddicoatite, a tourmaline, from Fianarantsoa Province, Madagascar. Polished slab, 5.8 × 4.7 × 0.4 cm.

1. Liandratite (IMA1975-039) 4.DH.35
  (IUPAC: uranium(VI) diniobium octaoxide)
2. Liberite (IMA1967 s.p., 1964) 9.AA.10
  (IUPAC: dilithium beryllium tetraoxysilicate)
3. Libethenite (andalusite: 1789) 8.BB.30
  (IUPAC: dicopper hydro phosphate)
4. Liddicoatite^{H} 9.CK.05 [no] [no]
  (Note: no type material available, formally discredited 2011; former liddicoatite was renamed fluor-liddicoatite)
5. Liebauite (IMA1990-040) 9.DO.25
  (IUPAC: tricalcium pentacopper hexacosaoxy nonasilicate)
6. Liebenbergite (olivine: IMA1972-033) 9.AC.05
  (IUPAC: dinickel tetraoxysilicate)
7. Liebermannite (lingunite: IMA2013-128) 9.FA. [no] [no]
  (IUPAC: potassium sodium octaoxy trisilicate)
8. Liebigite (Y: 1848) 5.ED.20
  (IUPAC: dicalcium uranyl tricarbonate undecahydrate)
9. Liguowuite (IMA2020-097) [no] [no]
  (IUPAC: tungsten trioxide)
10. Likasite (Y: 1955) 5.ND.05
  (IUPAC: tricopper pentahydro nitrate dihydrate)
11. Lileyite (seidozerite, lamprophyllite: IMA2011-021) 9.BE.25 [no]
12. Lillianite (lillianite: 1890) 2.JB.40a
  (Pb_{(3-2x)}Ag_{x}Bi_{(2+x)}S_{6})
13. Lime (Y: 1882) 4.AB.25
  (IUPAC: calcium oxide)
14. Limousinite (beryllophosphate zeolite: IMA2019-011) 7.0 [no] [no]
15. Linarite (linarite: 1822) 7.BC.65
  (IUPAC: lead copper dihydro sulfate)
16. Lindackerite (lindacherite: IMA1995 s.p. Rd, 1853) 8.CE.30
  (IUPAC: pentacopper diarsenate dihydroxoarsenate nonahydrate)
17. Lindbergite (humboltine: IMA2003-029) 10.AB.05 [no]
  (IUPAC: manganese(II) oxalate dihydrate)
18. Lindgrenite (Y: 1935) 7.GB.05
  (IUPAC: tricopper dihydro dimolybdate(VI))
19. Lindqvistite (IMA1991-038) 4.CC.45
  (IUPAC: dilead manganese(II) hexadecairon(III) heptacosaoxide)
20. Lindsleyite (crichtonite: IMA1982-086) 4.CC.40
21. Lindströmite (meneghinite: IMA1975-005a) 2.HB.05a
  (Pb_{3}Cu_{3}Bi_{7}S_{15})
22. Línekite (IMA2012-066) 5.0 [no] [no]
  (IUPAC: dipotassium tricalcium di[uranyl tricarbonate] heptahydrate)
23. Lingbaoite (IMA2018-138) 2.0 [no] [no]
  (IUPAC: silver tritelluride)
24. Lingunite (lingunite: IMA2004-054) 9.FA.70 [no]
  (IUPAC: sodium aluminium octaoxy trisilicate)
25. Linnaeite (spinel, linnaeite: 1845) 2.DA.05
  (IUPAC: cobalt(II) dicobalt(III) tetrasulfide)
26. Lintisite (IMA1989-025) 9.DB.15
  (IUPAC: trisodium lithium dititanium dioxy tetra(trioxy silicate) dihydrate)
27. Linzhiite (silicide: IMA2010-011) 1.BB.20 [no]
  (IUPAC: iron disilicide)
28. Liottite (cancrinite-sodalite: IMA1975-036) 9.FB.05
29. Lipscombite (Y: 1953) 8.BB.90
  (IUPAC: iron(II) diiron(III) dihydro diphosphate)
30. Lipuite (IMA2014-085) 9.0 [no] [no]
31. Liraite (IMA2019-085) 8.0 [no] [no]
32. Liroconite (Y: 1822) 8.DF.20
  (IUPAC: dicopper aluminium tetrahydro arsenate tetrahydrate)
33. Lisanite (IMA2021-014) [no] [no]
34. Lisetite (IMA1985-017) 9.FA.55
  (IUPAC: disodium calcium tetraluminium tetra(tetraoxy silicate))
35. Lishizhenite (IMA1989-002) 7.CB.75
  (IUPAC: zinc diiron(III) tetrasulfate tetradecahydrate)
36. Lisiguangite (IMA2007-003) 2.GA.25
  (IUPAC: copper platinum bismuth trisulfide)
37. Lisitsynite (IMA2000-008) 9.FA.25 [no]
  (IUPAC: potassium boron hexaoxy disilicate)
38. Liskeardite (Y: 1874) 8.DF.10
39. Lislkirchnerite (IMA2015-064) 5.N?. [no]
  (IUPAC: hexalead aluminium octahydro dichloro pentanitrate dihydrate)
40. Litharge (Y: 1917) 4.AC.20
  (IUPAC: lead oxide)
41. Lithiomarsturite (rhodonite: IMA1988-035) 9.DK.05
42. Lithiophilite (olivine: 1878) 8.AB.10
  (IUPAC: lithium manganese(II) phosphate)
43. Lithiophorite (Y: 1870) 4.FE.25
44. Lithiophosphate (Y: 1957) 8.AA.20
  (IUPAC: trilithium phosphate)
45. Lithiotantite (IMA1982-022) 4.DB.40
  (IUPAC: lithium tritantalum octaoxide)
46. Lithiowodginite (wodginite: IMA1988-011) 4.DB.40
  (IUPAC: lithium tritantalum octaoxide)
47. Lithosite (IMA1982-049) 9.GB.05
  (IUPAC: tripotassium dialuminium dodecaoxy tetrasilicate hydroxyl)
48. Litidionite (IMA2014-C, 1880) 9.DG.70
  (IUPAC: potassium sodium copper decaoxy tetrasilicate)
49. Litochlebite (watkinsonite: IMA2009-036) 2.HB.20e [no] [no]
  (IUPAC: disilver lead tetrabismuth octaselenide)
50. Litvinskite (lovozerite: IMA1999-017) 9.CJ.15a [no]
51. Liudongshengite (IMA2019-044) 5.0 [no] [no]
52. Liuite (corundum: IMA2017-042a) 4.CB. [no] [no]
  (IUPAC: iron titanium trioxide)
53. Liveingite (sartorite: 1902) 2.HC.05c
  (Pb_{20}As_{24}S_{56})
54. Liversidgeite (IMA2008-048) 8.0 [no] [no]
  (IUPAC: hexazinc tetraphosphate heptahydrate)
55. Livingstonite (Y: 1874) 2.JA.05i
  (HgSb_{4}S_{6}(S)_{2})
56. Lizardite (serpentine: 1956) 9.ED.15
  (IUPAC: trimagnesium pentaoxy disilicate tetrahydroxyl)
57. Llantenesite (spangolite: IMA2018-111) 7.0 [no] [no]
  (IUPAC: hexacopper dodecahydro chloro selenate trihydrate)
58. Lobanovite (astrophyllite, devitoite: IMA2015-B, 1963) 9.DC.05
59. Lokkaite-(Y) (tengerite: IMA1969-045) 5.CC.15
  (IUPAC: calcium tetrayttrium heptacarbonate nonahydrate)
60. Löllingite (löllingite: 1845) 2.EB.15a
  (IUPAC: iron diarsenide)
61. Lombardoite (brackebuschite: IMA2016-058) 8.0 [no] [no]
  (IUPAC: dibarium manganese(III) hydro diarsenate)
62. Lomonosovite (seidozerite, murmanite: IMA1967 s.p., 1950) 9.BE.32
  (IUPAC: hexasodium dititanium disodium dititanium di(heptaoxy disilicate) diphosphate tetraoxy)
63. Londonite (rhodizite: IMA1999-014) 6.GC.05
  (IUPAC: cesium tetraberyllium tetraluminium octacosaoxo (undecaboron beryllium))
64. Lonecreekite (alum: IMA1982-063) 7.CC.20
  (IUPAC: ammonium iron(III) disulfate dodecahydrate)
65. Lonsdaleite (IMA1966-044) 1.CB.10b
  (Note: pseudohexagonal allotrope of carbon (Németh et al., 2014). Meteoric lonsdaleite might be valid)
66. Loomisite (IMA2022-003)
67. Loparite-(Ce) (oxide perovskite: IMA1987 s.p., 1923) 4.CC.35
68. Lopatkaite (IMA2012-083) 2.0 [no] [no]
  (Pb_{5}Sb_{3}AsS_{11})
69. Lópezite (IMA2007 s.p., 1937) 7.FD.05
  (IUPAC: potassium dichromate(VI))
70. Lorándite (2007 s.p., 1894) 2.HD.05
  (IUPAC: thallium arsenide disulfide)
71. Loranskite-(Y) (IMA1987 s.p., 1899) 4.DG.05
  (Note: an ill-defined material)
72. Lorenzenite (Y: 1901) 9.DB.10
  (IUPAC: disodium dititanium trioxy (hexaoxy disilicate))
73. Loseyite (Y: 1929) 5.BA.30
  (IUPAC: tetramanganese(II) trizinc decahydoxo dicarbonate)
74. Lotharmeyerite (tsumcorite: IMA1982-060 Rd) 8.CG.15
  (IUPAC: calcium dizinc diarsenate dihydrate)
75. Loudounite (IMA1982-013) 9.HF.10
76. Loughlinite (IMA1967 s.p., 1960) 9.EE.25
77. Lourenswalsite (IMA1987-005) 9.EJ.05
78. Lovdarite (zeolitic tectosilicate: IMA1972-009) 9.GF.15
79. Loveringite (crichtonite: IMA1977-023) 4.CC.40
80. Lovozerite (lovozerite: 1939) 9.CJ.15a
81. Löweite (Y: 1847) 7.CC.45
  (IUPAC: dodecasodium heptamagnesium tridecasulfate pentadecahydrate)
82. Luanheite (amalgam: IMA1983-083) 1.AD.15b
  (IUPAC: trisilver mercury amalgam)
83. Luanshiweiite (mica: IMA2011-102) 9.E?. [no] [no]
84. Luberoite (IMA1990-047) 2.BC.35
  (IUPAC: pentaplatinum tetraselenide)
85. Luboržákite (pavonite: IMA2019-125) 2.0 [no] [no]
  (IUPAC: dimanganese pentasulfa arsenide antimonide)
86. Lucabindiite (lucabindiite: IMA2011-010) 8.0 [no] [no]
  (potassium,ammonium) (chloro,bromo) di(trioxo diarsenic)
87. Lucasite-(Ce) (IMA1986-020) 4.DH.10
  (IUPAC: cerium dititanium hydro pentaoxide)
88. Lucchesiite (tourmaline: IMA2015-043) 9.0 [no]
89. Luddenite (IMA1981-032) 9.HH.10
90. Ludjibaite (IMA1987-009) 8.BD.25
  (IUPAC: pentacopper tetrahydro diphosphate)
91. Ludlamite (Y: 1885) 8.CD.20
  (IUPAC: triiron(II) diphosphate tetrahydrate)
92. Ludlockite (IMA1969-046) 4.JA.45
  (IUPAC: lead tetrairon(III) decarsenic(III) docosaoxide)
93. Ludwigite (ludwigite: 1874) 6.AB.30
  (IUPAC: dimagnesium iron(III) dioxoborate)
94. Lueshite (oxide perovskite: IMA1962 s.p., 1959) 4.CC.30
  (IUPAC: sodium niobium trioxide)
95. Luetheite (chenevixite: IMA1976-011) 8.DD.05
  (IUPAC: dicopper dialuminium tetrahydro diarsenate monohydrate)
96. Lukechangite-(Ce) (IMA1996-033) 5.BD.05
  (IUPAC: trisodium dicerium fluoro tetracarbonate)
97. Lukkulaisvaaraite (IMA2013-115) 2.0 [no] [no]
  (Pd_{14}Ag_{2}Te_{9})
98. Lukrahnite (tsumcorite: IMA1999-030) 8.CG.20 [no]
99. Lulzacite (IMA1998-039) 8.BK.25 [no]
  (IUPAC: distrontium triiron(II) tetraluminium decahydro tetraphosphate)
100. Lumsdenite (vanarsite: IMA2018-092) 4.0 [no] [no]
101. Lüneburgite (Y: 1870) 6.AC.60
  (IUPAC: trimagnesium [diborate hexahydro diphosphate] hexahydrate)
102. Lunijianlaite (corrensite: IMA1989-056) 9.EC.60
  Note: a regular 1:1 interstratification of cookeite and pyrophyllite.
103. Lun'okite (overite: IMA1982-058) 8.0
  (IUPAC: magnesium manganese(II) aluminium hydro diphosphate tetrahydrate)
104. Luobusaite (silicide: IMA2005-052a) 1.BB.25
  (Fe_{0.84}Si_{2})
105. Luogufengite (IMA2016-005) 4.0 [no] [no]
  (IUPAC: diiron trioxide)
106. Lusernaite-(Y) (IMA2011-108) 5.0 [no]
  (IUPAC: tetrayttrium aluminium undeca(hydro,fluoro) dicarbonate hexahydrate)
107. Lussierite (IMA2018-101) 8.0 [no] [no]
  (IUPAC: decasodium [uranyl tetrasulfate] disulfate triwater)
108. Luxembourgite (IMA2018-154) 2.0 [no] [no]
109. Luzonite (stannite: 1874) 2.KA.10
  (IUPAC: tricopper arsenide tetrasulfide)
110. Lyonsite (IMA1986-041) 8.AB.40
  (IUPAC: tricopper(II) tetrairon(III) hexavanadate)
