= Leightonite =

Sulfate mineral

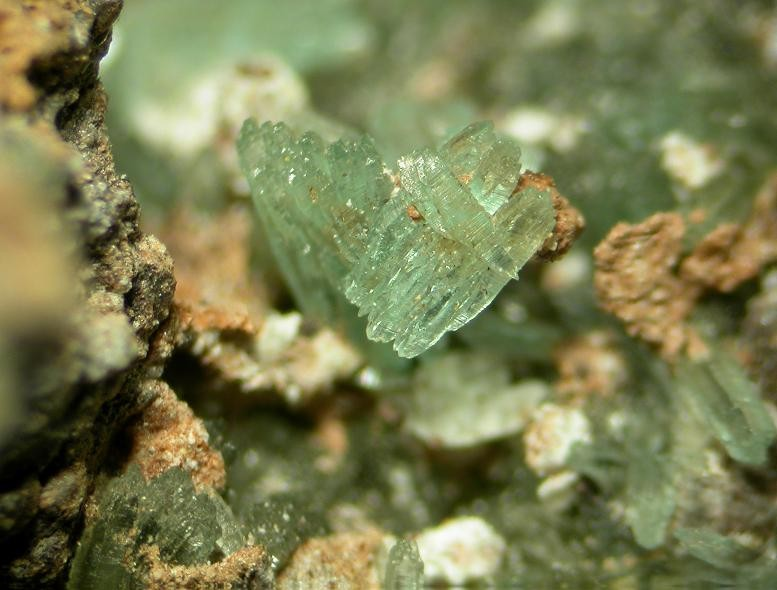

General
- Category: Sulfate minerals
- Formula: K_{2}Ca_{2}Cu(SO_{4})_{4}•2H_{2}O
- IMA symbol: Lgh
- Strunz classification: 7.CC.70
- Crystal system: Monoclinic
- Crystal class: Prismatic (2/m) (same H-M symbol)
- Space group: C2/c

Identification
- Color: Pale blue, greenish-blue; pale blue in transmitted light.
- Crystal habit: Lathlike crystals, flattened, elongated or equant; pseudo-orthorhombic
- Twinning: Lamellar twinning on (100) and (010) produces pseudo-orthorhombic symmetry
- Cleavage: None observed
- Mohs scale hardness: 3
- Luster: Vitreous
- Diaphaneity: Transparent, translucent
- Specific gravity: 2.95
- Optical properties: Biaxial (-)
- Refractive index: n_{α} = 1.578 n_{β} = 1.587 n_{γ} = 1.595
- Birefringence: δ = 0.017

Leightonite is a rare sulfate mineral with formula of K_{2}Ca_{2}Cu(SO_{4})_{4}•2H_{2}O.

== Crystal class ==
Leightonite forms flattened to elongated bladed crystals of variously interpreted crystal structure. Its crystal system is reported as triclinic morphologically, but also as pseudo-orthorhombic due to intricate lamellar twinning that mimics orthorhombic symmetry. Because it is triclinic, the crystal is represented by a system of three unequal vectors with corresponding unequal angles between them.

== Optical class ==
Leightonite is anisotropic, meaning it has more than one refractive index, in this case three as it is biaxial. The mineral can split polarized light into two rays with different direction and velocity, resulting in the appearance of interference colors when recombined and viewed under polarized light.

== Discovery and occurrence ==
It was first described in 1938 for an occurrence in the Chuquicamata Mine, Colama, El Loa Province, Antofagasta Region, Chile, and named in honor of Tomas Leighton Donoso (1896–1967), Professor of Mineralogy at the University of Santiago, Chile.

It occurs in alkali oxidized zones of copper deposits and is associated with natrochalcite, blodite, atacamite, bellingerite, kröhnkite, gypsum and quartz in the discovery location at Chuquicamata, Chile, along with chalcanthite, anhydrite and lammerite in Tsumeb, Namibia. It has also been reported from the Schwaz area of North Tyrol, Austria, and the Visdalen Soapstone Quarry, Lom, Norway.

At the mining site of Chuquicamata, Chile, Leightonite is not found in rich ore; rather it only appears in borderland material within 50 m (160 ft) of the surface, acting as a cement between rock fragments as it fills in cracks and cross-fiber veins in surfaces as a network of crystals. Although a hydrous sulfate of copper, it is not a major source of the element. Because of its rare nature, it is valued by mineral collectors.
