= Laplandite-(Ce) =

Multiple chain inosilicate mineral

Laplandite
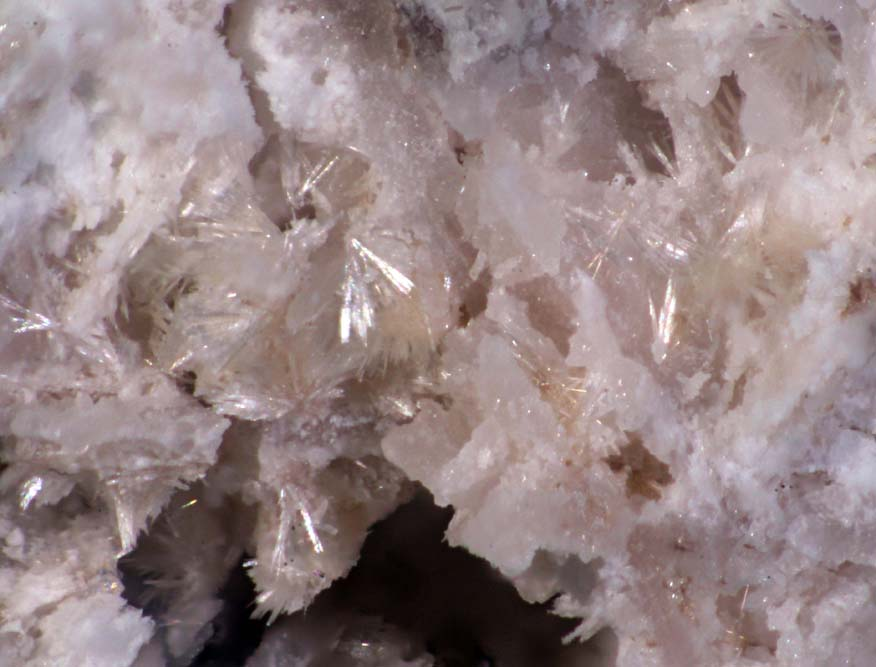
- Laplandite-(Ce) associated with zorite, terskite and eudialyte

General
- Category: Inosilicates
- Formula: Na_{4}CeTiPO_{4}Si_{7}O_{18}•5H_{2}O
- IMA symbol: Lpl-Ce
- Strunz classification: 9.DJ.10
- Crystal system: Orthorhombic
- Crystal class: Dipyramidal (mmm); H-M symbol: (2/m 2/m 2/m)
- Space group: Pmmm

Identification
- Formula mass: 949.59 g/mol
- Color: gray-white, pale yellow, pale blue
- Crystal habit: radial, prismatic
- Cleavage: none
- Fracture: splintery
- Mohs scale hardness: 2-3
- Luster: vitreous
- Streak: white
- Diaphaneity: transparent to translucent
- Specific gravity: 2.71
- Density: 2.83
- Optical properties: biaxial (-) & moderate relief
- Refractive index: nα = 1.568 nβ = 1.584 nγ = 1.585
- Birefringence: maximum: δ = 0.017

Laplandite has a general formula of Na_{4}CeTiPO_{4}Si_{7}O_{18}•5H_{2}O, and is found primarily in igneous rocks. This silicate mineral has been found as inclusions in pegmatites, primarily in the Kola Peninsula in Lappland, where the mineral's name gets its origin. Laplandite is orthorhombic, which states that crystallographically, it contains three axes of unequal lengths that all intersect at 90 degrees, perpendicular to one another. The shape of the crystal is bipyramidal, and is similar in structure to olivine or aragonite. Because of these different axes lengths, it shows anisotropism, which will allow for the visibility of birefringence. This property can give the mineral very distinct colors when viewed under cross-polarization. Laplandite has three different indices of refraction, which are measures of the speed of light in vacuum divided by the speed of light within the mineral, determined individually on each axis. Due to these different indices, Laplandite is a biaxial mineral, which states that the mineral will have two optic axes. Under the microscope, this mineral has moderate relief, which describes the contrast between Laplandite's refractive index and the refractive index of the mounting medium on which it is placed. The relief can be seen physically as how easily you can see the boundary lines of the mineral under plane polarized light in a petrographic microscope.

Because of Laplandite's sodium solubility, it has been designated as a candidate for extracting soda from the rocks in which it is found. This readily soluble mineral has given geologists clues about the history of the source of the parent rock, as water-soluble minerals do not form near surface temperatures and pressures. Also, the formation of this type of chemical assemblage is commonly located near phosphate and rare-element deposits, giving it another important characteristic as a good indicator to where more economic minerals can be found.
