= Lahnsteinite =

General
- Category: Hydroxysulfate
- Formula: Zn_{4}(SO_{4})(OH_{6})*3H_{2}O
- IMA symbol: Lah
- Crystal system: Triclinic
- Crystal class: 1-Pedial
- Space group: P1̅
- Unit cell: a = 8.3125 Å, b = 14.545 Å c = 18.504 Å; α=89.71° β=90.05°, γ=90.13°; Z = 8

Identification
- Formula mass: 609.863g/mol
- Color: Colorless
- Crystal habit: Tabular crystals
- Cleavage: Parallel on the {001}
- Tenacity: Flexible
- Mohs scale hardness: 1.5
- Diaphaneity: Transparent
- Specific gravity: 2.98g/cm^{3}
- Optical properties: biaxial negative
- Refractive index: n_{α}= 1.568 n_{β}= 1.612 n_{γ}= 1.613
- Birefringence: δ=0.045

Lahnsteinite is a basic sulfate mineral first discovered in the Friedrichssegen Mine, Germany in a goethite cavity. Though found in goethite, the crystals of Lahnsteinite are few millimeters in size, and are tabular shaped. Lahnsteinite was the first mineral discovered in the Lahn Valley deposits. The empirical formula for lahnsteinite is (Zn_{3.3},Fe_{0.27},Cu_{0.11})_{3.91}(S_{0.98}O_{4})(OH)_{5}*3H_{2.10}O.

== Occurrence ==
Lahnsteinite was first found in a cavernous kidney-like goethite. Typically Lahnsteinite is found near goethite, pyromorphite, quartz and native copper. When found with these minerals, the Lahnsteinite crystals are overgrowing the walls of several cavities. Lahnsteinite is a uniquely rare mineral, as it occurs in very small amounts in two known locations around the world. The first location is in the mine it was found in, just outside of Lahnstein Germany, the second, in a small mine in southern California.

== Physical properties ==
Lahnsteinite is a colorless or lightly blue colored transparent mineral. It exhibits a hardness of 1.5 on the Mohs hardness scale placing it right between talc and gypsum. This is characterized by the perfect mica-like cleavages planes parallel to the {001} face. Lahnsteinite crystals occur as hexagonal plates combining to form a triclinic cell. The major forms are {001} and {00-1} faces. Lahnsteinite is flexible with lamellae cleavages. The measured density is 2.98 g/cm^{3}.

== Optical properties ==
Lahnsteinite is biaxial negative, no dispersion of optical axes was observed.

== Chemical properties ==
The chemical composition of lahnsteinite was determined on a Tescan Vega II XMU SEM equipped with an INCAx-sight EDS that operates on a tungsten cathode at an accelerating voltage of 20 kV. The current of the absorbed electrons on Co was 0.6 nA. The angle of selection of X-ray radiation was 35°, and the focal distance between sample and detector was 25 mm. The F, Na, Mg, Al, P, Cl, K, Ca, Mn, As, Sb, Pb, and Bi contents in lahnsteinite are below their detection limits by electron microprobe. The water content was measured with gas chromatography of the product of the ignition of the mineral at 1200 °C.

== Chemical composition ==
Oxide	wt%	Range
FeO	3.87	3.12-4.57
CuO	1.68	1.35-1.90
ZnO	57.85	56.44-59.54
SO_{3}	15.83	15.40-16.33
H_{2}O	22.3	
Total	101.53	-

== X-ray crystallography ==
The X-ray powder diffraction pattern of Lahnsteinite is readily indexed in a triclinic unit cell with the unit-cell dimensions refined by the least squares method a = 8.35(3), b = 14.48(4), c = 18.60(6) Å, α = 89.4(2), β = 90.2(1), γ = 90.6(2)°, V = 2249(8) Å3. The single-crystal X-ray diffraction data were collected with an Xcalibur CCD diffractometer, MoKα radiation. The triclinic (space group P1) unit-cell dimensions calculated from the single-crystal data are a = 8.3125(6), b = 14.545(1), c = 18.504(2) Å, α = 89.71(1), β = 90.05(1), γ = 90.13(1)°, V = 2237.2(3) Å3, Z = 8

== See also ==
- List of Minerals
