= Lislkirchnerite =

Rare nitrate mineral

General
- Category: Nitrate mineral
- Formula: Pb_{6}Al(OH)_{8}Cl_{2}(NO_{3})_{5}•2H_{2}O
- IMA symbol: Lcn
- Crystal system: Monoclinic
- Crystal class: Prismatic (2/m) (same H-M symbol)
- Space group: P2_{1}/n
- Unit cell: a = 10.78, b = 9.06 c = 13.62 [Å], β = 102.28° (approximated)

Identification

Lislkirchnerite is a rare nitrate mineral with the formula Pb_{6}Al(OH)_{8}Cl_{2}(NO_{3})_{5}•2H_{2}O. It was discovered in Nueva Esperanza No. 1 mine within the Capillitas deposit, Catamarca, Argentina.

== Similar minerals ==
Lislkirchnerite is the first mineral with combined lead and nitrate. The structure of the mineral is unique.
