= Aspedamite =

Heteropolyniobate mineral

General
- Category: Minerals
- Formula: []_{12}(Fe^{3+}_{2}Fe^{2+})Nb_{4}(ThNb_{9}Fe^{3+}_{2}Ti^{4+}O_{42})(H_{2}O)_{9}(OH)_{3}
- IMA symbol: Apd

Identification
- Color: Brownish orange to deep red
- Cleavage: None Observed
- Luster: Adamantine
- Streak: Very pale orange
- Specific gravity: 4.070

Aspedamite is a very rare mineral, one of two natural heteropolyniobates. Its chemical formula (one of the possible formulas) is complex and shows the presence of essential vacancies: []_{12}(Fe^{3+}_{2}Fe^{2+})Nb_{4}(ThNb_{9}Fe^{3+}_{2}Ti^{4+}O_{42})(H_{2}O)_{9}(OH)_{3}. Its structure (isometric, space group Im3) is the same as of the second known heteropolyniobate - menezesite. Aspedamite is somewhat similar to another mineral from Norway, peterandresenite, which is a hexaniobate.
