= Peterandresenite =

Natural hexaniobate mineral

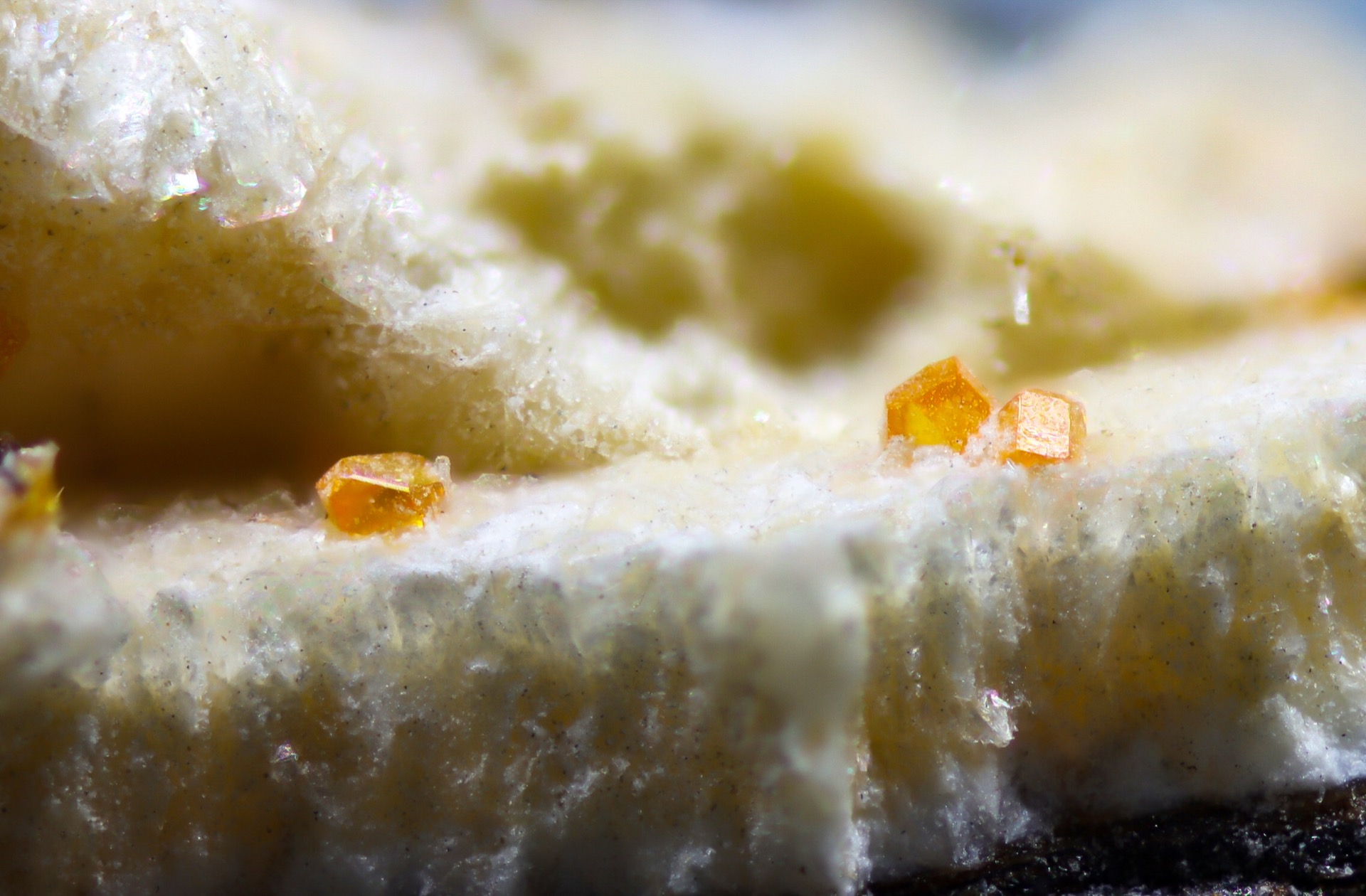

General
- Category: Oxide, Hexaniobate
- Formula: Mn_{4}Nb_{6}O_{19}•14H_{2}O
- IMA symbol: Pan
- Crystal system: Monoclinic
- Crystal class: Prismatic (2/m) (same H-M symbol)
- Space group: C2/m
- Unit cell: a = 15.33, b = 9.41, c = 11.28 [Å], β = 118.65° (approximated); Z = 2

Identification
- Color: Orange
- Crystal habit: crystals (equidimensional)
- Cleavage: None
- Fracture: Uneven
- Tenacity: Brittle
- Mohs scale hardness: 2-2.5
- Luster: Vitreous or resinous
- Streak: Pale orange
- Diaphaneity: Transparent or translucent
- Density: 3.05 (calc.), 3.10 (meas.) [g/cm^{3}]

Peterandresenite is a very rare mineral, the first known natural hexaniobate. Its chemical formula is Mn_{4}Nb_{6}O_{19}•14H_{2}O. Its structure contains a special type of octahedron: Lindqvist ion. Peterandresenite was found in a pegmatite of the Larvik complex in Norway. It is somewhat similar to other unique niobium minerals, aspedamite and menezesite.

== Occurrence ==
Peterandresenite was discovered in AS Granit quarry, Tvedalen, Larvik, Vestfold, Norway.
