= Ophirite =

General
- Category: Tungstate
- Formula: Ca_{2}Mg_{4}[Zn_{2}Mn^{3+}_{2}(H_{2}O)_{2}(Fe^{3+}W_{9}O_{34})_{2}] · 46•H_{2}O
- IMA symbol: Oph
- Strunz classification: 7.GB.80
- Crystal system: Triclinic
- Crystal class: 1̅ - Pinacoidal
- Space group: P1̅
- Unit cell: a = 11.9860(2) Å, b = 13.2073(2) Å c = 17.689(1) Å; β= 85.364(6)°; α = 69.690(5)°; γ = 64.875(5)°; Z = 1

Identification
- Formula mass: 5726.57
- Color: Orange-brown
- Crystal habit: Tablet-shaped crystals
- Cleavage: None observed
- Fracture: Irregular/uneven
- Tenacity: Brittle
- Mohs scale hardness: 2
- Luster: Vitreous
- Streak: Pale orange
- Diaphaneity: Transparent
- Specific gravity: 4.060 g/cm^{3}
- Optical properties: Biaxial positive
- Refractive index: n_{α}= 1.730(3) n_{β}= 1.735(3) n_{γ}= 1.770(3)
- Birefringence: δ = 0.040
- Pleochroism: Visible
- Dispersion: r > v, strong
- Ultraviolet fluorescence: None

Ophirite is a tungstate mineral first discovered in the Ophir Hill Consolidated mine at Ophir district, Oquirrh Mountains, Tooele County, Utah, United States of America. It was found underground near a calcite cave in one veinlet, six centimeters wide by one meter long, surrounded by different sulfides. Before the closing of the mine in 1972, it was dominated by sulfide minerals, and the Ophir district was known for being a source of zinc, copper, silver, and lead ores. The crystals are formed as tablets. It is the first known mineral to contain a heteropolyanion, a lacunary defect derivative of the Keggin anion. The chemical formula of ophirite is Ca_{2}Mg_{4}[Zn_{2}Mn^{3+}_{2}(H_{2}O)_{2}(Fe^{3+}W_{9}O_{34})_{2}] · 46•H_{2}O. The mineral has been approved by the Commission on New Minerals and Mineral Names, IMA, to be named ophirite for its type locality, the Ophir Consolidated mine.

== Occurrence ==
Ophirite is found in association with scheelite and pyrite. The production of the mineral is thought to be from oxidative alteration of sulfides: a reaction between dolomite and scheelite with oxidizing and late acidic hydrothermal solutions that are in the presence of calcium-rich and pyrite hornfels. It occurs in one veinlet, which is surrounded by sphalerite, galena, bournonite, unidentified sulfide minerals, foci of apatite, and sericite-containing pyrite, and is typically interface between scheelite and dolomite. Also present in the vein are crystals of sulfur and fluorite.

== Physical properties ==
Ophirite is an orange-brown, transparent mineral with a vitreous luster. It exhibits a hardness of 2 on the Mohs hardness scale. Ophirite occurs as tablet-shaped crystals on {001} with irregular {100} and {110} bounding forms. Ophirite has no observed cleavage and irregular/uneven fracture. The measured specific gravity is 4.060 g/cm^{3}.

== Optical properties ==
Ophirirte is biaxial positive, which means it will refract light along two axes. The mineral is optically biaxial positive, 2V_{meas.} 43(2)°. The refractive indices are: α ~ 1.730(3), β ~ 1.735(3), and γ ~ 1.770(3)°. Dispersion is strong, r > v. Its pleochroism is light orange brown for X and Y, and orange brown for Z, where X<Y<<Z. Observations indicate that chemical species are in their fully oxidized states.

== Chemical properties ==
Ophirite is a tungstate, and is the first mineral discovered containing ^{[4]}Fe^{3+[6]}W^{6+}_{9}O_{34}, a group in the structural unit of the ophirite polyanion. Tri-lacunary Keggin anions are well known in synthetic compounds, but ophirite is the first known example of a mineral with a tri-lacunary Keggin polyanion.The empirical chemical formula for ophirite calculated on the basis of 30 cations, is Ca_{1.73}Mg_{3.99}[Zn_{2.02}Mn^{3+}_{1.82}(H_{2}O)_{2}(Fe^{3+}_{2.34}W_{17.99}O_{68})_{2}] · 45.95•H_{2}O. The ideal formula for ophirite is Ca_{2}Mg_{4}[Zn_{2}Mn^{3+}_{2}(H_{2}O)_{2}(Fe^{3+}W_{9}O_{34})_{2}] · 46•H_{2}O.

== Chemical composition ==
Constituent	wt%	ideal wt%
CaO	1.68	1.94
MgO	2.79	2.78
ZnO	2.86	2.81
Mn_{2}O_{3}	2.50	2.73
Fe_{2}O_{3}	3.25	2.76
Sb_{2}O_{3}	0.61	-
WO_{3}	71.94	72.06
H_{2}O	15.24	14.92
Total	100.87	100.00

== X-ray crystallography ==
A Rigaku R-Axis Rapid II curved imaging plate microdiffractometer using monochromatized MoKα radiation was used to collect X-ray diffraction data for ophirite. Ophirite is in the triclinic crystal system and in the space group P1̅. Its unit-cell dimensions were determined to be a = 11.9860(2) Å; b = 13.2073(2) Å; c = 17.689(1) Å; β= 85.364(6)°; α = 69.690(5)°; γ = 64.875(5)°; Z = 1.

== See also ==
- List of minerals
