= Chesterite =

Silicate mineral

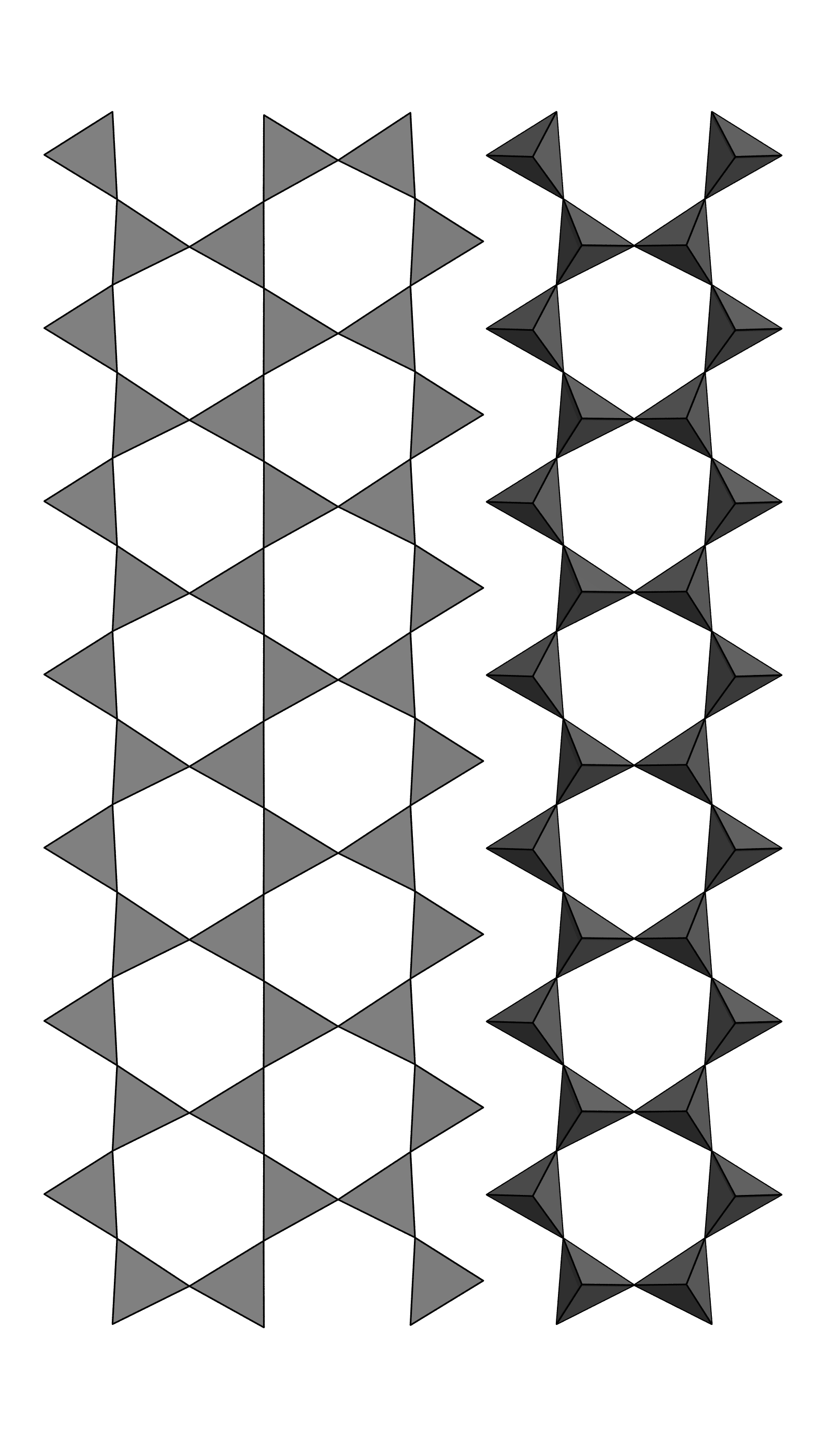
- Chesterite structure

General
- Category: Inosilicates (multiple chains)
- Formula: (Mg,Fe)_{17}Si_{20}O_{54}(OH)_{6}
- IMA symbol: Chs
- Strunz classification: 9.DF.05
- Crystal system: Orthorhombic
- Crystal class: Pyramidal (mm2) (same H-M symbol)
- Space group: A2_{1}ma
- Unit cell: a = 18.61 Å, b = 45.3 Å, c = 5.29 Å, V = 4,459.64 Å^{3}; Z = 4

Identification
- Formula mass: 2,074.96 g/mol
- Color: Colorless, pink, brown
- Cleavage: (110) perfect
- Mohs scale hardness: 2-2.5
- Luster: Silky - pearly
- Streak: white
- Diaphaneity: transparent
- Specific gravity: 3.23
- Optical properties: Biaxial negative
- Refractive index: α=1.617, β=1.632, γ=1.64
- Birefringence: δ = 0.023
- Pleochroism: weak, pink-brown
- 2V angle: 70°

Chesterite is a rare silicate mineral that can be compared to amphiboles, micas, and jimthompsonite. Its chemical formula is (Mg,Fe)_{17}Si_{20}O_{54}(OH)_{6}. Chesterite is named after Chester, Vermont, where it was first described in 1977. The specific geologic setting within its origin is the Carleton talc quarry in Chester, Vermont.

Chesterite has an orthorhombic crystal structure, which means it has three crystallographic axes of unequal length. All of the axes are perpendicular to each other. The stacking sequence for chesterite, which is found in micas, is very similar to orthopyroxenes and orthoamphiboles. Chesterite is an anisotropic mineral; therefore, it allows light to travel through it at different velocities when viewed at different angles. Chesterite is usually found in thin sheets within ultramafic rocks.

A polytype of chesterite could be anthophyllite, which has a similar crystal structure. Chesterite is used for research on stacking formations and symmetry point groups that could be possible polymorphs or polysomes of the amphibole-anthophyllite groups. Chesterite has no direct usage, but some geologists or scientists generally classify it under the amphibole-anthophyllite group.
