= Zorite =

Silicate mineral

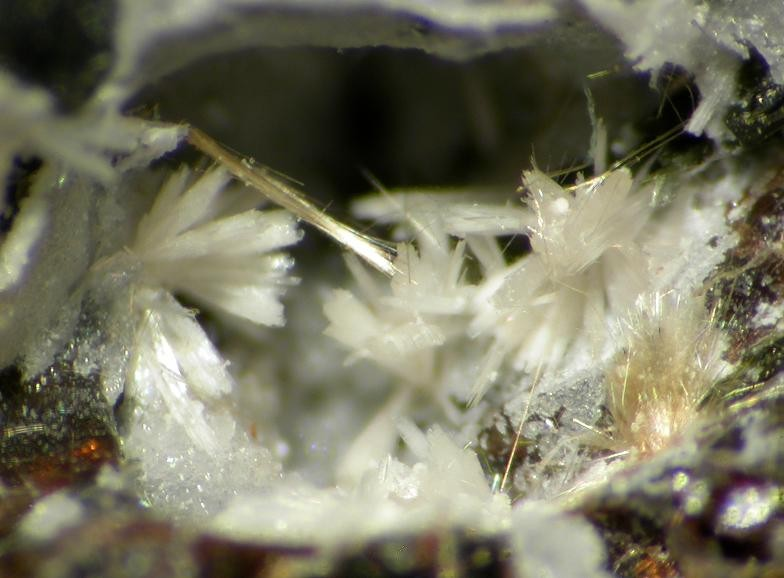

General
- Category: Inosilicate
- Formula: Na_{2}Ti(Si,Al)_{3}O_{9}·nH_{2}O
- IMA symbol: Zor
- Strunz classification: 9.DG.45
- Crystal system: Orthorhombic
- Crystal class: Dipyramidal (mmm); H-M symbol: (2/m 2/m 2/m)
- Space group: Cmmm
- Unit cell: a = 23.91 Å, b = 7.23 Å c = 14.24 Å; V=2,461.66 Å^{3}; Z = 1

Identification
- Formula mass: 1,538.53 g/mol
- Color: Rose red
- Crystal habit: Prismic acicular crystals, sometimes radiating
- Cleavage: Perfect
- Mohs scale hardness: 3~4
- Luster: Vitreous
- Streak: White
- Diaphaneity: Transparent
- Specific gravity: 2.18
- Optical properties: Anisotropic, biaxial
- Refractive index: n = 1.59
- Pleochroism: x=rose, y=colorless, z=blue
- Other characteristics: Found in cavities and fractures in alkalic pegmatite

Zorite is a silicate mineral with the chemical formula of Na_{2}Ti(Si,Al)_{3}O_{9}·nH_{2}O. It is named because of its pink color, after the Russian word "zoria" which refers to the rosy hue of the sky at dawn. It is primarily found in Mount Karnasurta, Lovozero Massif, Kola Peninsula, Russia. The Lovozero Massif is an area with an igneous mountain range, home to various types of minerals such as eudialyte, loparite, and natrosilitite.

Crystallographically, zorite belongs in the orthorhombic group, which has 3 axes, a, b, and c that are of unequal lengths (a≠b≠c) that form 90° with each other. It also belongs in the point group 2/m2/m2/m. The state of aggregation for zorite is acicular. Zorite has perfect cleavage along the planes {010} and {001}, while having poor cleavage along the plane {110}. Zorite is anisotropic, which means that the velocity of light is not the same in all directions. It belongs in the biaxial group, because it is an orthorhombic mineral. Under plane polarized light, zorite displays different colors depending on the angle that the light hits the mineral. This quality is called pleochroism and zorite is rose along the x-axis, colorless along the y-axis, and bluish along the z-axis. The index of refraction of zorite is 1.59, which is the velocity of light through vacuum over the velocity of light through zorite. Zorite is studied to better understand silicate structures.

In 2003, zorite was looked into to analyze the symmetry and topology of a family of three minerals found in Russia, Nenadkevichite, Labuntsovite, and Zorite. Zorite was also studied to comprehend how silicate structures change when an element is replaced, for example when the sodium is replaced with potassium, caesium and phosphorus. Furthermore, because of its rarity, zorite is one of the collector's items coveted for its scarcity, as well as it being a valuable source to understanding silicate topology.
