= Copper(II) arsenate =

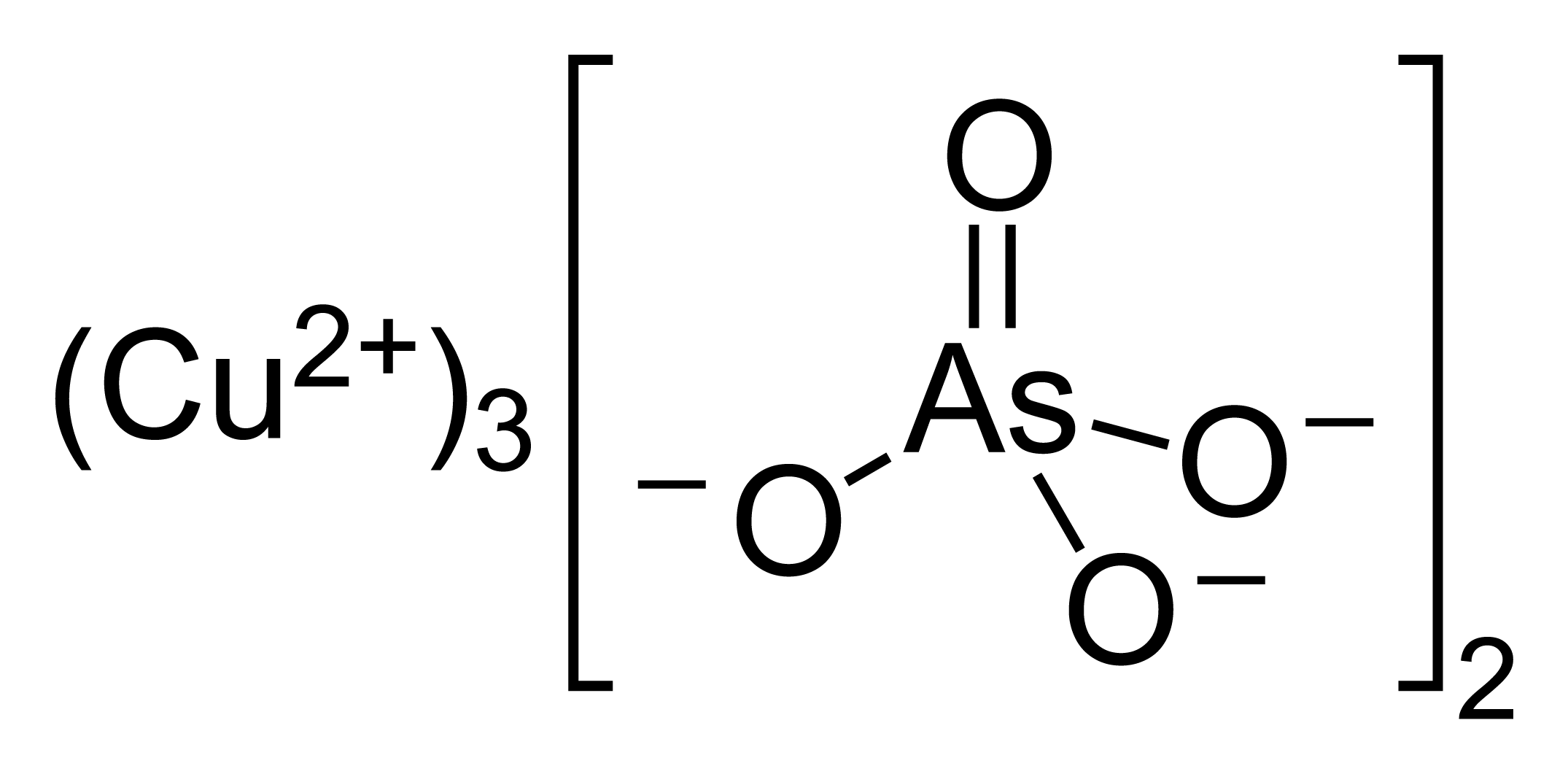

Names
- IUPAC name Copper(II) arsenate
- Other names: Copper arsenate; Copper orthoarsenate; Cupric arsenate; Tricopper arsenate; Tricopper orthoarsenate

Identifiers
CAS Number	7778-41-8
3D model (JSmol)	Interactive image
ChemSpider	24279
PubChem CID	26065
UNII	EV78GZO3YS
CompTox Dashboard (EPA)	DTXSID30894196
- InChI: InChI=1S/2AsH3O4.3Cu/c2*2-1(3,4)5;;;/h2*(H3,2,3,4,5);;;/q;;3*+2/p-6 Key: RKYSWCFUYJGIQA-UHFFFAOYSA-H; InChI=1/2AsH3O4.3Cu/c2*2-1(3,4)5;;;/h2*(H3,2,3,4,5);;;/q;;3*+2/p-6 Key: RKYSWCFUYJGIQA-CYFPFDDLAM
- SMILES: [Cu+2].[Cu+2].[Cu+2].[O-][As]([O-])(=O)[O-].[O-][As]([O-])([O-])=O

Properties
Chemical formula	Cu_{3}(AsO_{4})_{2}
Molar mass	468.48 g/mol
Appearance	blue or bluish green solid
Density	5.2 g/cm^{3}
Melting point	1,100 °C (2,010 °F; 1,370 K)
Solubility in water	insoluble
Solubility product (K_{sp})	7.95×10^{−36}
Solubility	insoluble in alcohol soluble in ammonia solution, dilute acids

Structure
Crystal structure	monoclinic
Space group	P2_{1}/c
Lattice constant	a = 6.327 Å, b = 8.642 Å, c = 11.313 Å α = 92.04°, β = 90°, γ = 90°
Formula units (Z)	4 units per cell

Hazards
- GHS labelling
Pictograms	(GHS07: Exclamation mark) (GHS08: Health hazard)
Signal word	Danger
Hazard statements	H319, H350, H361, H370, H372
Precautionary statements	P203, P260, P264, P264+P265, P270, P280, P305+P351+P338, P308+P316, P318, P319, P321, P337+P317, P405, P501
- NIOSH (US health exposure limits)
PEL (Permissible)	TWA 1 mg/m^{3} (as Cu)
REL (Recommended)	TWA 1 mg/m^{3} (as Cu)
IDLH (Immediate danger)	TWA 100 mg/m^{3} (as Cu)
- Except where otherwise noted, data are given for materials in their standard state (at 25 °C [77 °F], 100 kPa). verify (what is ?) Infobox references

Copper arsenate is an inorganic compound with the chemical formula Cu_{3}(AsO_{4})_{2}·nH_{2}O (n=0,4). It is a blue or bluish-green solid, forming monoclinic crystals.

== Occurrence ==
Anhydrous copper arsenate (Cu_{3}(AsO_{4})_{2}) is found in nature as the mineral lammerite. The tetrahydrate (Cu_{3}(AsO_{4})_{2}·4H_{2}O) occurs naturally as the mineral rollandite.

== Preparation ==
Copper arsenate can be prepared by reacting disodium hydrogen arsenate and copper(II) chloride in aqueous solution.

== Uses ==
Copper arsenate is an insecticide used in agriculture. It is also used as a herbicide, fungicide, and a rodenticide. It is also used as a poison in slug baits.

== Related compounds ==
Basic copper arsenates with the formulas Cu_{2}(OH)AsO_{4} and Cu_{3}(AsO_{4})(OH)_{3} have been observed. The former is found naturally as the mineral olivenite.

== See also ==
- Calcium arsenate
- Chromated copper arsenate
- Lead arsenate
- Paris green (copper acetoarsenite)
- Scheele's green (copper arsenite)
