= Leucophanite =

Single chain inosilicate mineral

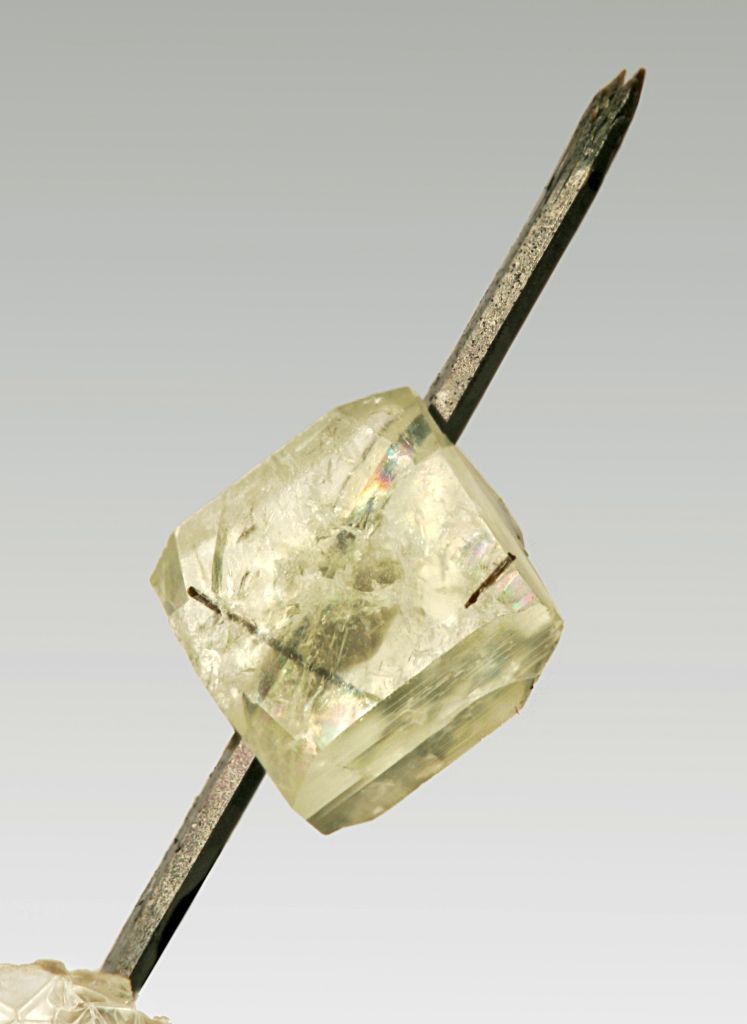
- The leucophanite on an aegirine needle (about 4–5 mm on edge)

General
- Category: Inosilicates
- Formula: (Na,Ca)_{2}BeSi_{2}(O_{.}OH_{.}F)_{7}
- IMA symbol: Lph
- Strunz classification: 9.DH.05
- Crystal system: Orthorhombic
- Crystal class: Disphenoidal (222) (same H-M symbol)
- Space group: P2_{1}2_{1}2_{1}

Identification

Leucophanite is an inosilicate mineral with the chemical formula (Na,Ca)_{2}BeSi_{2}(O_{.}OH_{.}F)_{7}. It may contain cerium substituting in the calcium position.

It occurs in pegmatites and alkali igneous complexes as yellow, greenish or white triclinic crystals and has been found in Norway, Quebec and Russia.

It was first described from the Langesundfiord district of southern Norway in 1840. The name is from the Greek leukos for "white" and phanein for "to appear" in allusion to the common white color.
