= List of minerals recognized by the International Mineralogical Association (K) =

This list includes those recognised minerals beginning with the letter K. The International Mineralogical Association is the international group that recognises new minerals and new mineral names; however, minerals discovered before 1959 did not go through the official naming procedure, although some minerals published previously have been either confirmed or discredited since that date. This list contains a mixture of mineral names that have been approved since 1959 and those mineral names believed to still refer to valid mineral species (these are called "grandfathered" species).

The list is divided into groups:

- Introduction • (Main synonyms)
- A • B • C • D • E • F • G • H • I • J • K • L • M • N • O • P–Q • R • S • T • U–V • W–X • Y–Z

The data was exported from mindat.org on 29 April 2005; updated up to 'IMA2021'.

The minerals are sorted by name, followed by the structural group (rruff.info/ima and ima-cnmnc by mineralienatlas.de, mainly) or chemical class (mindat.org and basics), the year of publication (if it's before of an IMA approval procedure), the IMA approval and the Strunz-mindat code. The first link is to mindat.org, the second link is to webmineral.com, and the third is to the Handbook of Mineralogy (Mineralogical Society of America).

- Abbreviations:
  - ^{D} – discredited (IMA/CNMNC status).
  - ^{Q} – questionable/ doubtful (IMA/CNMNC, mindat.org or mineralienatlas.de status).
  - ^{N} – published without approval of the IMA/CNMNC, or just not an IMA approved mineral but with some acceptance in the scientific community nowadays.
  - ^{I} – intermediate member of a solid-solution series.
  - ^{H} – hypothetical mineral (synthetic, anthropogenic, suspended approval procedure, etc.)
    - ^{ch} – incomplete description, hypothetical solid solution end member.
  - Rd – redefinition of ...
  - "s.p." – special procedure.
  - group – a name used to designate a group of species, sometimes only a mineral group name.
  - no – no link available.
  - IUPAC – chemical name.
  - Y: NNNN – year of publication.
  - Y: old – known before publications were available.

== K ==
=== Ka ===
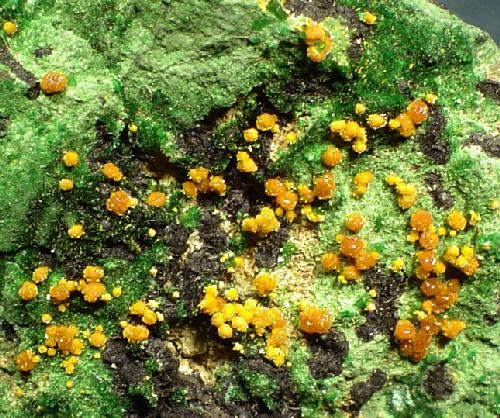
Kasolite (a lead uranium silicate) and malachite from Musonoi mine, Kolwezi, Western area, former Katanga (Shaba), Democratic Republic of Congo

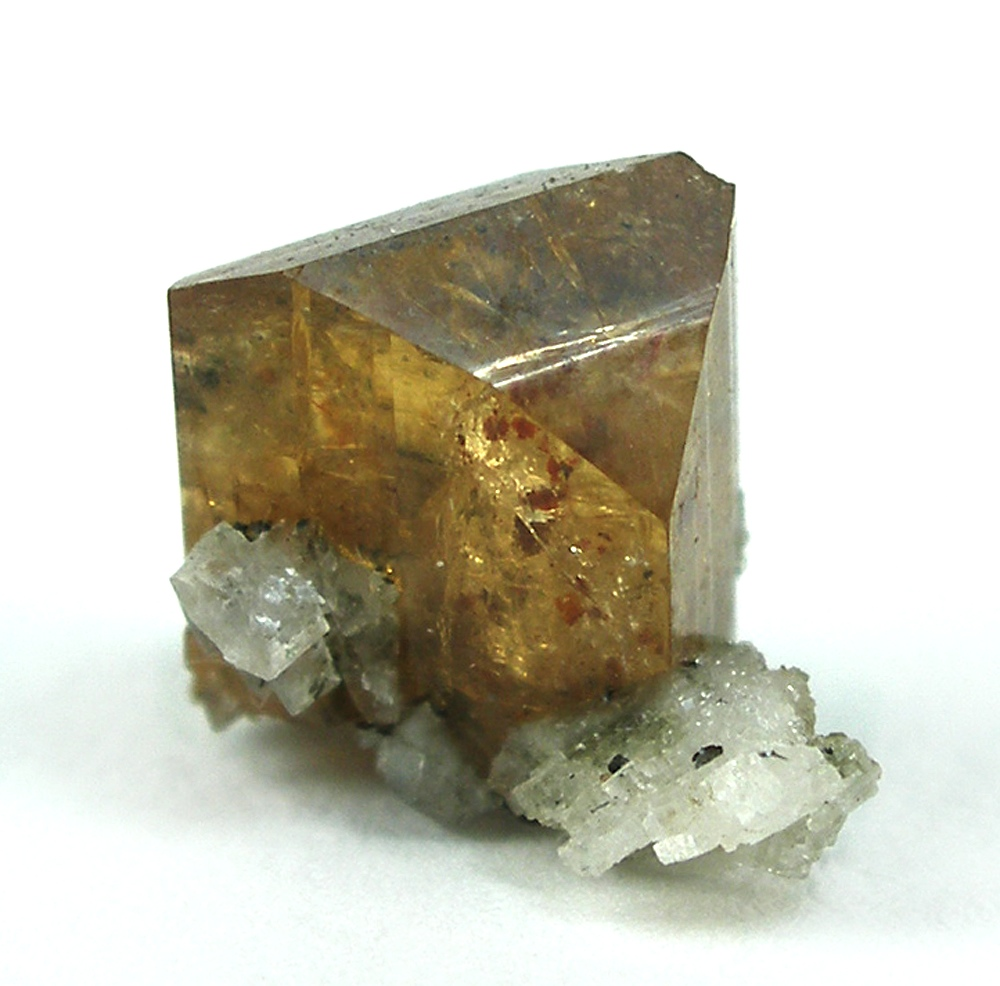
Kainosite-(Y) from amphibolite quarry, Urenkopf Mt., Haslach, Black Forest, Baden-Württemberg, Germany

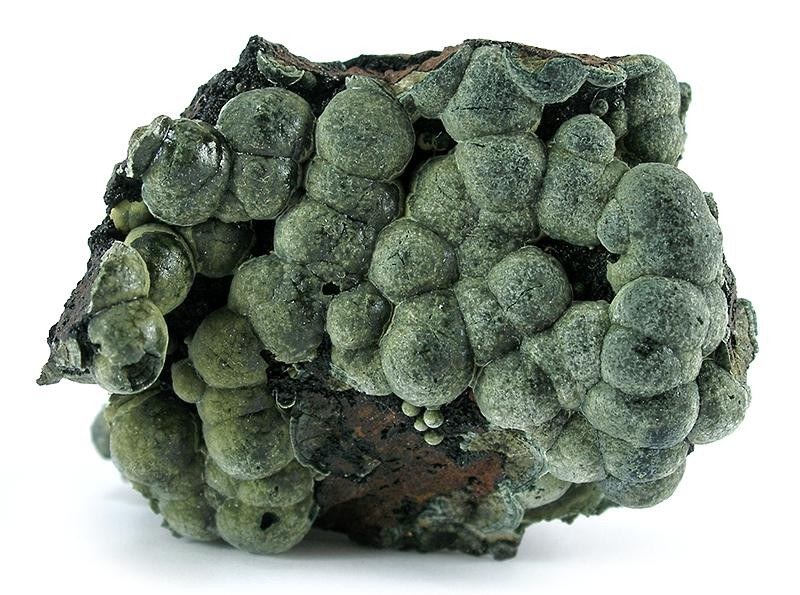
Kidwellite from Three Oaks Gap workings, Three Oaks Gap, Polk County, Arkansas, USA

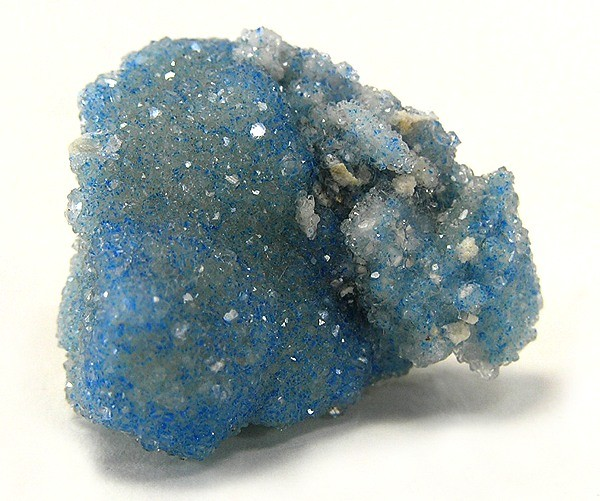
Kinoite, Christmas Mine, Banner District, Dripping Spring Mts, Gila County, Arizona, US; size 2.7 × 2.5 × 1.8 cm

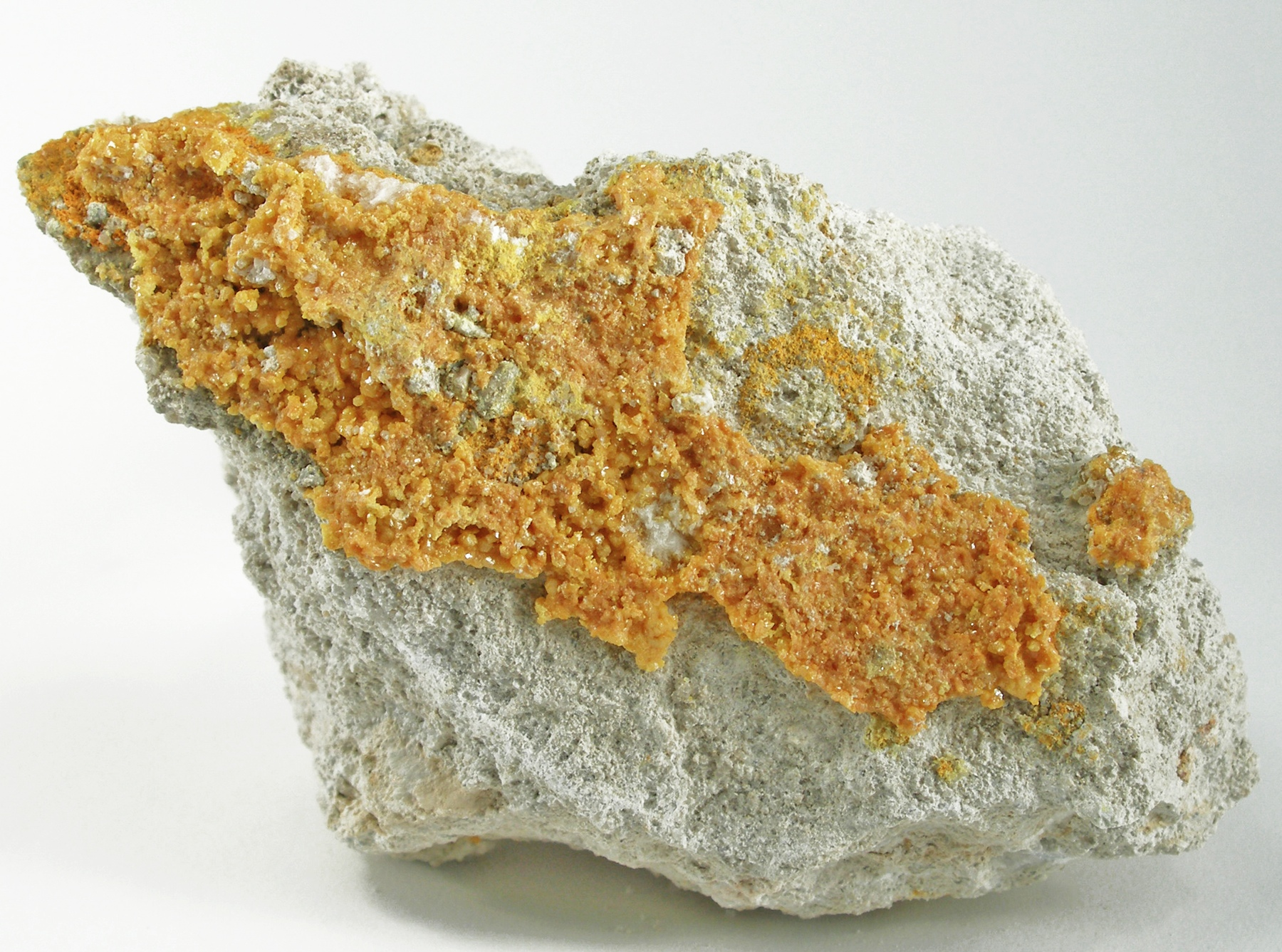
Kleinite from McDermitt Mine, Opalite District, Humboldt County, Nevada, USA

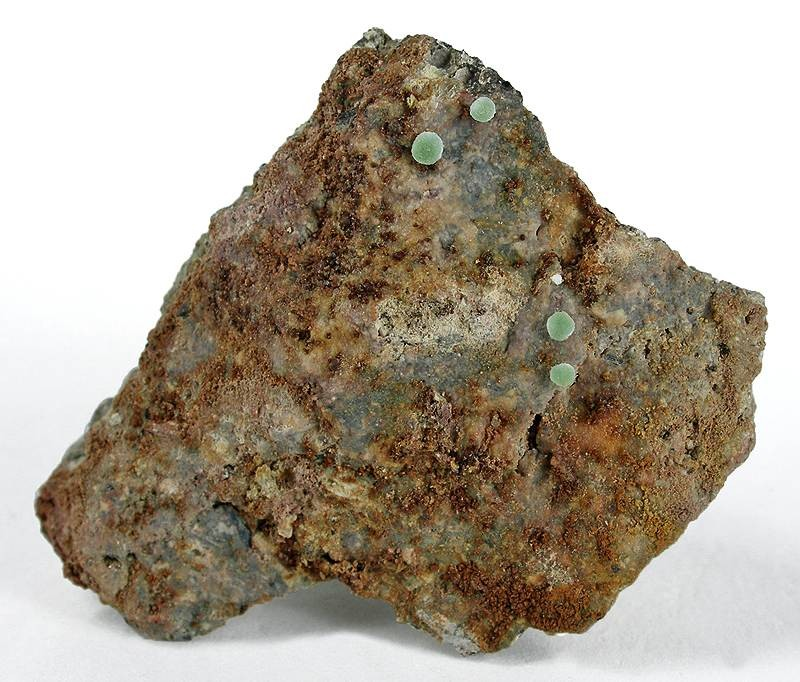
Kolbeckite from Schlarbaum quarry, Klause, Bad Gleichenberg, Styria, Austria

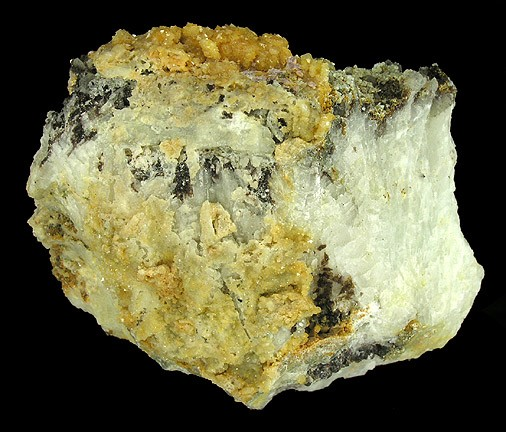
Kosnarite from Jenipapo district, Itinga, Jequitinhonha valley, Minas Gerais, Southeast Region, Brazil

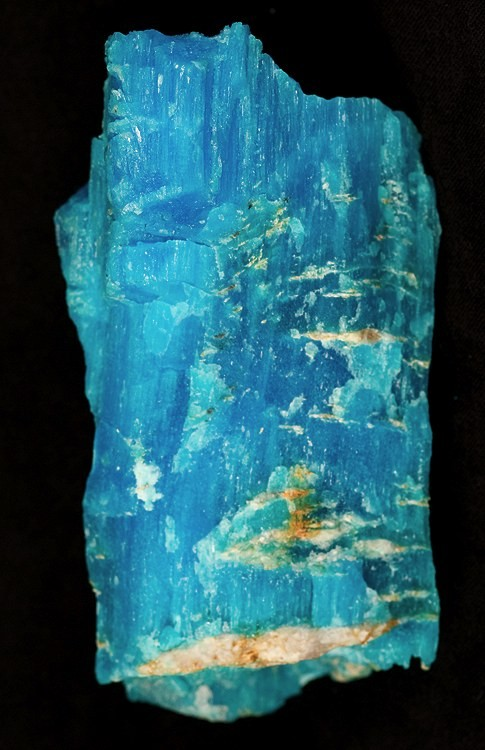
Krohnkite (sodium copper sulfate), Chuquicamata mine, El Loa Province, Antofagasta Region, Chile; size: 9.9 × 4.7 × 3.2 cm

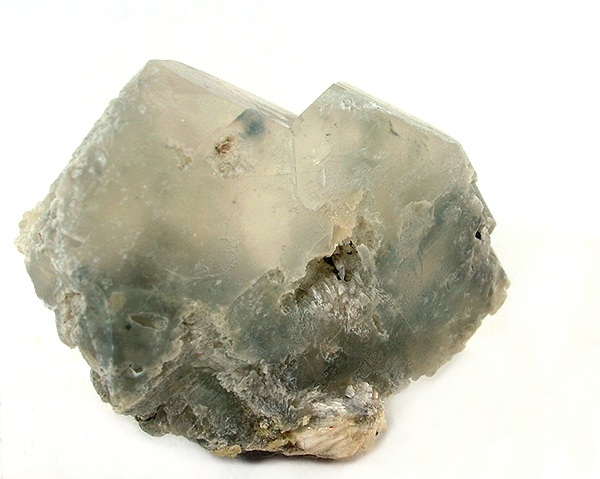
Kurnakovite from Boron, Kramer District, Kern County, California, USA

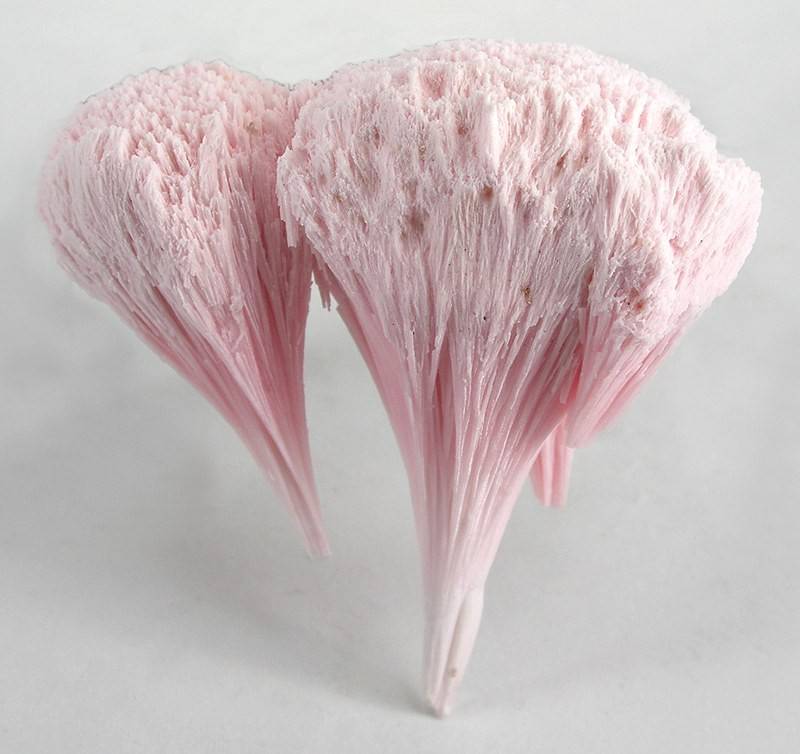
Two kutnohorite crystal clusters from the Wessels Mine, Kalahari manganese fields, Northern Cape Province, South Africa; size 6.2 × 6.1 × 3.8 cm

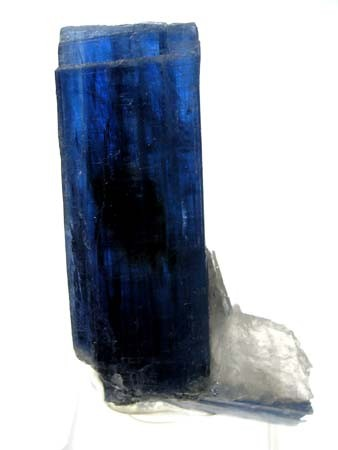
Intense blue kyanite from Barra de Salinas district, Coronel Murta, Minas Gerais, Brazil; size 4.6 × 2.8 × 1.3 cm

1. Kaatialaite (IMA1982-021) 8.CC.10
  (IUPAC: iron(III) tri(dihydroxoarsenate) trihydrate)
2. Kabalovite (IMA2021-117)
3. Kadyrelite (IMA1986-042) 3.DD.05
  (IUPAC: tri(dimercury) oxo hydrotriborate)
4. Kaersutite [O-dominant amphibole: IMA2012 s.p., IMA1997 s.p.] 9.DE.15
5. Kahlenbergite (magnetoferrite: IMA2018-158) 4.0 [no] [no]
6. Kahlerite (Y: 1953) 8.EB.05
  (IUPAC: iron(II) diuranyl diarsenate dodecahydrate)
7. Kainite (Y: 1865) 7.DF.10
  (IUPAC: potassium magnesium chloro sulfate trihydrate)
8. Kainosite-(Y) (IMA1987 s.p., 1886) 9.CF.10
  (IUPAC: dicalcium diyttrium tetra(trioxysilicate) carbonate monohydrate)
9. Kainotropite (IMA2015-053) 8.0 [no] [no]
  (IUPAC: tetracopper iron(III) dioxide heptaoxodivanadate tetraoxovanadate)
10. Kaitianite (IMA2017-078a) 4.0 [no] [no]
11. Kalborsite (zeolitic tectosilicate: IMA1979-033) 9.GA.15
12. Kalgoorlieite (IMA2015-119) 2.0 [no] [no]
  (IUPAC: diarsenic tritelluride)
13. Kaliborite (Y: 1889) 6.FB.10
14. Kalicinite (Y: 1868) 5.AA.20
  (IUPAC: potassium hydrogen carbonate)
15. Kalifersite (IMA1996-007) 9.EE.25 [no] [no]
16. Kalininite (spinel, linnaeite: IMA1984-028) 2.DA.05
  (IUPAC: zinc dichromium tetrasulfide)
17. Kalinite^{Q} (Y: 1868) 7.CC.15
  (IUPAC: potassium aluminium disulfate undecahydrate)
  Note: possibly alum-(K).
18. Kaliochalcite (tsumcorite: IMA2013-037) 7.0 [no] [no]
  (IUPAC: potassium dicopper disulfate [(hydro)(water)])
19. Kaliophilite (feldspathoid, nepheline: 1887) 9.FA.05
  (IUPAC: potassium aluminium tetraoxysilicate)
20. Kalistrontite (palmierite: IMA1967 s.p., 1962) 7.AD.40
  (IUPAC: dipotassium strontium disulfate)
21. Kalithallite (IMA2017-044) 3.0 [no] [no]
  (IUPAC: tripotassium hexachlorothallate(III) dihydrate)
22. Kalsilite (feldspathoid, nepheline: 1942) 9.FA.05
  (IUPAC: potassium aluminium tetraoxysilicate)
23. Kalungaite (ullmannite: IMA2004-047) 2.EB.25
  (IUPAC: palladium arsenide selenide)
24. (Kamacite: iron variety, 1.AE.05, α-(iron,nickel) alloy)
25. Kamaishilite (IMA1980-052) 9.FB.10
  (IUPAC: dicalcium dihydro hexaoxy dialuminosilicate)
26. Kamarizaite (IMA2008-017) 8.0 [no]
  (IUPAC: triiron(III) trihydro diarsenate trihydrate)
27. Kambaldaite (IMA1982-098) 5.DA.20
  (IUPAC: sodium tetranickel trihydro tricarbonate trihydrate)
28. Kamchatkite (IMA1987-018) 7.BC.35
  (IUPAC: potassium tricopper chloro oxodisulfate)
29. Kamenevite (IMA2017-021) 9.DG. [no] [no]
  (IUPAC: potassium titanium nonaoxytrisilicate monohydrate)
30. Kamiokite (nolanite: IMA1975-003) 4.CB.40
  (IUPAC: diiron(II) trimolybdenum(IV) octaoxide)
31. Kamitugaite (IMA1983-030) 8.ED.15
  (PbAl(UO_{2})_{5}(PO_{4})_{2}(OH)_{9}·9.5H_{2}O)
32. Kamotoite-(Y) (IMA1985-051) 5.EA.30
  (IUPAC: diyttrium tetrauranyl tetraoxo tricarbonate tetradecahydrate)
33. Kampelite (IMA2016-084) 8.0 [no] [no]
34. Kampfite (IMA2000-003) 9.EG.20
35. Kamphaugite-(Y) (IMA1987-043) 5.DC.10
  (IUPAC: calcium yttrium hydro dicarbonate monohydrate)
36. Kanemite (IMA1971-050) 9.EF.25
  (IUPAC: hydrogen sodium pentaoxydisilicate trihydrate)
37. Kangite (bixbyite: IMA2011-092) 4.0 [no] [no]
38. Kangjinlaite (silicide: IMA2019-112b) [no] [no]
  (IUPAC: undecatitanium decasilicide)
39. Kaňkite (IMA1975-005) 8.CE.60
  (IUPAC: diiron(III) diarsenate heptahydrate)
40. Kannanite (ardennite: IMA2015-100) 9.BJ. [no] [no]
41. Kanoite (pyroxene: IMA1977-020) 9.DA.10
  (IUPAC: manganese magnesium hexaoxydisilicate)
42. Kanonaite (andalusite: IMA1976-047) 9.AF.10
  (IUPAC: manganese(III) aluminium oxy tetraoxysilicate)
43. Kanonerovite (IMA1997-016) 8.FC.30
  (IUPAC: trisodium manganese decaoxotriphosphate dodecahydrate)
44. Kaolinite (kaolinite: IMA1980 s.p., old) 9.ED.05
  (IUPAC: aluminium pentaoxydisilicate tetrahydroxyl)
45. Kapellasite (atacamite: IMA2005-009) 3.DA.10c [no]
  (IUPAC: tricopper zinc hexahydroxide dichloride)
46. Kapitsaite-(Y) (hyalotekite: IMA1998-057) 9.CH.05 [no]
  (Ba_{4}Y_{2}Si_{8}B_{4}O_{28}F)
47. Kapundaite (IMA2009-047) 8.0 [no] [no]
  (IUPAC: sodium calcium tetrairon(III) trihydro tetraphosphate pentahydrate)
48. Kapustinite (lovozerite: IMA2003-018) 9.CJ.15a
49. Karasugite (IMA1993-013) 3.CB.30
  (IUPAC: strontium calcium heptafluoroaluminate)
50. Karchevskyite (hydrotalcite: IMA2005-015a) 5.DA.
51. Karelianite (corundum: IMA1967 s.p., 1963) 4.CB.05
  (IUPAC: divanadium trioxide)
52. Karenwebberite (olivine: IMA2011-015) 8.AB.10 [no] [no]
  (IUPAC: sodium (iron(II),manganese(II)) phosphate)
53. Karibibite (IMA1973-007) 4.JA.15
  (IUPAC: diiron(III) hydro tetra(dioxoarsenate(III)) pentaoxodiarsenate(III))
54. Karlditmarite (IMA2021-003) [no] [no]
55. Karlite (IMA1980-030) 6.AB.25
56. Karnasurtite-(Ce)^{Q} (IMA1987 s.p., 1959) 9.BE.70
57. Karpenkoite (volborthite: IMA2014-092) 8.0 [no] [no]
  (IUPAC: tricobalt dihydro heptaoxodivanadate dihydrate)
58. Karpinskite^{Q} (corrensite: 1957) 9.EC.60
  Note: possibly a Ni-rich antigorite or a Ni-rich interstratification of a talc-group mineral and a chlorite-group mineral.
59. Karpovite (IMA2013-040) 7.0 [no] [no]
  (IUPAC: dithallium vanadium oxodisulfate water)
60. Karupmøllerite-Ca (labuntsovite: IMA2001-028) 9.CE.30c [no]
61. Kasatkinite (IMA2011-045) 9.0 [no]
  (Ba_{2}Ca_{8}B_{5}Si_{8}O_{32}(OH)3·6H_{2}O)
62. Kashinite (IMA1982-036) 2.DB.15
  (IUPAC: diiridium trisulfide)
63. Kaskasite (valleriite: IMA2013-025) 4.0 [no]
  ((Mo,Nb)S_{2}•(Mg_{(1−x)}Al_{x})(OH)_{(2+x)})
64. Kasolite (IMA1980 s.p., 1921) 9.AK.15
  (IUPAC: lead uranyl tetrasilicate monohydrate)
65. Kassite (IMA1968 s.p., 1965) 4.DH.10
  (IUPAC: calcium dititanium dihydro tetraoxide)
66. Kastningite (stewardite, laueite: IMA1997-033) 8.DC.30
  (IUPAC: manganese(II) dialuminium dihydro diphosphate octahydrate)
67. Katayamalite (baratovite: IMA1982-004) 9.CJ.25 [no]
68. Katerinopoulosite (picromerite: IMA2017-004) 7.0 [no] [no]
  (IUPAC: diammonium zinc disulfate hexahydrate)
69. Katiarsite (IMA2014-025) 8.0 [no] [no]
  (IUPAC: potassium titanium oxoarsenate)
70. Katoite (garnet: IMA1982-080a) 9.AD.25
  (IUPAC: tricalcium dialuminium dodecahydroxide)
71. Katophorite [Na-Ca-amphibole: IMA2013-140, IMA2012 s.p., magnesiokatophorite (IMA1997 s.p.), katoforit (1894)] 9.DE.20
72. Katoptrite (Y: 1917) 9.AE.40
  (IUPAC: tridecamanganese(II) tetraluminium diantimony(V) icosaoxy ditetraoxysilicate)
73. Katsarosite (humboldtine: IMA2020-014) [no] [no]
74. Kawazulite (tetradymite: IMA1968-014) 2.DC.05
  (IUPAC: dibismuth ditelluride selenide)
75. Kayrobertsonite (IMA2015-029) 8.0 [no] [no]
  (IUPAC: manganese dialuminium dihydro diphosphate hexahydrate)
76. Kayupovaite (IMA2022-045)
77. Kazakhstanite (IMA1988-044) 8.CB.45
78. Kazakovite (lovozerite: IMA1973-061) 9.CJ.15a
  (IUPAC: hexasodium manganese(II) titanium octadecaoxyhexasilicate)
79. Kazanskyite (seidozerite, lamprophyllite: IMA2011-007) 9.B?. [no]
80. Kaznakhtite (hydrotalcite: IMA2021-056) [no] [no] [no]

=== Ke – Kl ===
1. Keckite (whiteite: IMA1977-028) 8.DH.15
2. Kegelite (IMA1974-042 Rd) 9.EC.80
3. Kegginite (polyoxometalate: IMA2015-114) 8.0 [no] [no]
4. Keilite (galena, rocksalt: IMA2001-053) 2.CD.10
  (IUPAC: iron sulfide)
5. Keithconnite (IMA1978-032) 2.BC.20
  (IUPAC: icosalead heptatelluride)
6. Keiviite (thortveitite) 9.BC.05
  (IUPAC: diREE heptaoxodisilicate)
  1. Keiviite-(Y) (IMA1984-054) 9.BC.05
  2. Keiviite-(Yb) (IMA1982-065) 9.BC.05
7. Keldyshite (IMA1975-034) 9.BC.10
  (IUPAC: disodium zirconium heptaoxodisilicate)
8. Kellyite (serpentine: IMA1974-002) 9.ED.15
9. Kelyanite (IMA1981-013) 3.DD.60
  (IUPAC: dodecamercury antimony hexaoxide bromide dichloride)
10. Kemmlitzite (alunite, beudandite: IMA1967-021) 8.BL.05
  (IUPAC: strontium trialuminium arsenate hexahydro sulfate)
11. Kempite (atacamite: 1924) 3.DA.10a
  (IUPAC: dimanganese(II) chloride trihydroxide)
12. Kenhsuite (IMA1996-026) 2.FC.15b
  (IUPAC: trimercury dichloro disulfide)
13. Kenngottite (IMA2018-063a) 8.0 [no] [no]
14. Kenoargentotennantite-(Fe) (tetrahedrite: IMA2020-062) 2.0 [no] [no]
15. Kenoargentotetrahedrite
  1. Kenoargentotetrahedrite-(Fe) (tetrahedrite: IMA2018-K) 2.0 [no] [no]
  2. Kenoargentotetrahedrite-(Zn) (tetrahedrite: IMA2020-075) 2.0 [no] [no]
16. Kenoplumbomicrolite (pyrochlore: IMA2015-007a) 4.DH. [no] [no]
17. Kenorozhdestvenskayaite-(Fe) (IMA2022-001)
18. Kenotobermorite (tobermorite: IMA2014 s.p.) 9.DG. [no] [no]
19. Kentbrooksite (eudialyte: IMA1996-023) 9.CO.10 [no]
20. Kentrolite (Y: 1881) 9.BE.80
  (IUPAC: dilead dimanganese(III) dioxy(heptaoxodisilicate)
21. Kenyaite (IMA1967-018) 9.HA.10
22. Keplerite (whitlockite: IMA2019-108) 8.0 [no] [no]
23. Kerimasite (garnet: IMA2009-029) 9.AD.25 [no]
  (IUPAC: tricalcium dizirconium tetraoxysilicate di(tetraoxo iron(II)))
24. Kermesite (Y: 1832) 2.FD.05
  (IUPAC: diantimony oxodisulfide)
25. Kernite (Y: 1927) 6.DB.05
26. (Kerolite (saponite, smectite: 1823) 9.E?. [no] [no])
27. Kernowite (IMA2020-053) 8.DF. [no] [no]
28. Kesebolite-(Ce) (IMA2019-097) 9.0 [no] [no]
29. Kësterite (stannite: 1958) 2.CB.15a
  (IUPAC: dicopper zinc tin tetrasulfide)
30. Kettnerite (bismutite: 1956) 5.BE.30
  (IUPAC: calcium bismuth fluoro oxocarbonate)
31. Keutschite (stannite: IMA2014-038) 2.0 [no] [no]
  (IUPAC: dicopper silver arsenide tetrasulfide)
32. Keyite (alluaudite: IMA1975-002) 8.CA.50
  ((☐_{0.5}Cu_{0.5})CuCdZn_{2}(AsO_{4})_{3}·H_{2}O)
33. Keystoneite (zemannite: IMA1987-049) 4.JM.05
  (IUPAC: magnesium dinickel diiron(III) hexa(trioxotellurate(IV)) nonahydrate)
34. Khademite (IMA1973-028 Rd) 7.DB.10
  (IUPAC: aluminium fluoro sulfate pentahydrate)
35. Khaidarkanite (cyanotrichite: IMA1998-013) 3.DA.45 [no]
  (IUPAC: tetracopper trialuminium tetradecahydroxide trifluoride dihydrate)
36. Khamrabaevite (carbide, rocksalt: IMA1983-059) 1.BA.20
  (IUPAC: titanium carbide bearing vanadium and iron)
37. Khanneshite (burbankite: IMA1981-025) 5.AC.30
38. Kharaelakhite (pentlandite: IMA1983-080) 2.BB.15
  ((Cu,Pt,Pb,Fe,Ni)_{9}S_{8})
39. Khatyrkite (khatyrkite: IMA1983-085) 1.AA.15
  (IUPAC: copper dialuminium alloy)
40. Khesinite (sapphirine: IMA2014-033) 9.D?. [no] [no]
41. Khibinskite (IMA1973-014) 9.BC.10
  (IUPAC: dipotassium zirconium heptaoxodisilicate)
42. Khinite (tellurium oxysalt: IMA1978-035) 4.FD.30
  (IUPAC: tricopper(II) lead dihydro tellurium(VI) hexaoxide)
43. Khmaralite (sapphirine: IMA1998-027) 9.DH.50 [no]
44. Khomyakovite (eudialyte: IMA1998-042) 9.CO.10 [no]
45. Khorixasite (descloizite: IMA2016-048) 8.0 [no] [no]
46. Khrenovite (alluaudite: IMA2017-105) 8.0 [no] [no]
  (Na_{3}(Fe^{3+})_{2}(AsO_{4})_{3})
47. Khristovite-(Ce) (epidote, dollaseite: IMA1991-055) 9.BG.05 [no]
  (IUPAC: calcium cerium (magnesium aluminium manganese(II)) heptaoxodisilicate tetraoxysilicate fluoride hydroxyl)
48. Khurayyimite (IMA2018-140) 9.B?. [no] [no]
49. Khvorovite (hyalotekite: IMA2014-050) 9.C?. [no] [no]
50. Kiddcreekite (IMA1982-106) 2.CB.35a
  (IUPAC: hexacopper tungsten tin octasulfide)
51. Kidwellite (IMA1974-024) 8.DK.20
  (IUPAC: sodium nonairon(III) undecahydro hexaphosphate trihydrate)
52. Kieftite (skutterudite: IMA1991-052) 2.EC.05
  (IUPAC: cobalt triantimonide)
53. Kieserite (kieserite: IMA1967 s.p., 1861) 7.CB.05
  (IUPAC: magnesium sulfate monohydrate)
54. Kihlmanite-(Ce) (tundrite: IMA2012-081) 9.A?. [no] [no]
  (IUPAC: dicerium titanium dioxium tetraoxosilicate hydrogencarbonate (water))
55. Kilchoanite (Y: 1961) 9.BJ.45
  (IUPAC: hexacalcium tetraoxysilicate decaoxytrisilicate)
56. Killalaite (IMA1973-033) 9.BE.85
  (Ca_{6.4}[H_{0.6}Si_{2}O_{7}]_{2}(OH)_{2})
57. Kimrobinsonite (IMA1983-023) 4.FG.15
  (IUPAC: thallium trihydroxide (oxo,carbonate))
58. Kimuraite-(Y) (tengerite: IMA1984-073) 5.CC.15
  (IUPAC: calcium diyttrium tetracarbonate hexahydrate)
59. Kimzeyite (garnet: IMA1967 s.p., 1961) 9.AD.25
60. Kingite (Y: 1957) 8.DC.47
  (IUPAC: trialuminium difluoro hydro diphosphate heptahydrate)
61. Kingsgateite (IMA2019-048) 7.0 [no] [no]
62. Kingsmountite (calcioferrite: IMA1978-041) 8.DH.25
  (IUPAC: tetracalcium iron(II) tetraluminium tetrahydro hexaphosphate dodecahydrate)
63. Kingstonite (IMA1993-046) 2.DA.25
  (IUPAC: trirhodium tetrasulfide)
64. Kinichilite (zemannite: IMA1979-031) 4.JM.05
65. Kinoite (IMA1969-037) 9.BH.10
  (IUPAC: dicalcium dicopper decaoxytrisilicate dihydrate)
66. Kinoshitalite (mica: IMA1973-011) 9.EC.35
  (IUPAC: barium trimagnesium (dialuminodecaoxydisilicate) dihydroxyl)
67. Kintoreite (alunite, crandallite: IMA1992-045) 8.BL.10
  (IUPAC: lead triiron(III) hexahydro phosphate hydroxophosphate)
68. Kipushite (IMA1983-046) 8.DA.35
  (IUPAC: hexacopper hexahydro diphosphate monohydrate)
69. Kircherite (cancrinite: IMA2009-084) 9.FB.05 [no] [no]
70. Kirchhoffite (zeolitic tectosilicate: IMA2009-094) 9.GB.05 [no]
  (IUPAC: caesium bismuth hexaoxydisilicate)
71. Kirkiite (IMA1984-030) 2.JB.30b
  (Pb_{10}Bi_{3}As_{3}S_{19})
72. Kirschsteinite (olivine: 1957) 9.AC.05
  (IUPAC: calcium iron(II) tetraoxysilicate)
73. Kiryuite (IMA2021-041) [no] [no] [no]
74. Kishonite (hydride: IMA2020-023) 1.0 [no] [no]
  (IUPAC: vanadium dihydride)
75. Kitagohaite (alloy: IMA2013-114) 1.0 [no]
  (IUPAC: heptaplatinum copper alloy)
76. Kitkaite (IMA1968 s.p., 1965) 2.EA.20
  (IUPAC: nickel telluride selenide)
77. Kittatinnyite (IMA1982-083) 9.AG.35
  (IUPAC: dicalcium dimanganese manganese di(tetraoxysilicate) tetrahydroxyl nonahydrate)
78. Kladnoite^{H} (Y: 1942) 10.CA.25
  (IUPAC: phthalimide)
79. Klajite (IMA2010-004) 8.CE.30 [no] [no]
  (IUPAC: manganese tetracopper diarsenate dihydroxoarsenate nonahydrate)
80. Klaprothite (IMA2015-087) 7.0 [no] [no]
  (IUPAC: hexasodium uranyl tetrasulfate tetrahydrate)
81. Klebelsbergite (IMA1980 s.p., 1929 Rd) 7.BB.35
  (IUPAC: tetraantimony(III) dihydro tetraoxosulfate)
82. Kleberite (tivanite: IMA2012-023, 1960) 4.CB.25 [no] [no]
  (IUPAC: iron(III) hexatitanium pentahydro undecaoxide)
83. Kleemanite (IMA1978-043) 8.DC.17
  (IUPAC: zinc dialuminium dihydro diphosphate trihydrate)
84. Kleinite (Y: 1905) 3.DD.35
  ((Hg_{2}N)(Cl,SO_{4})·nH_{2}O)
85. Klöchite (milarite: IMA2007-054) 9.CM. [no]
86. Klockmannite (Y: 1928) 2.CA.05b
  (Cu_{5.2}Se_{6})
87. Klyuchevskite (IMA1987-027) 7.BC.45
  (IUPAC: tripotassium tricopper iron(III) dioxotetrasulfate)

=== Kn – Ko ===
1. Knasibfite (fluorosilicate: IMA2006-042) 3.CH.25
  (IUPAC: tripotassium tetrasodium tri(hexafluorosilicate) tetrafluoroborate)
2. Knorringite (garnet, garnet: IMA1968-010) 9.AD.25
  (IUPAC: trimagnesium dichromium tri(tetraoxysilicate))
3. Koashvite (lovozerite: IMA1973-026) 9.CJ.15c
4. Kobeite-(Y) (IMA1987 s.p., 1950) 4.DG.05
  Note: might contain Zr as an essential constituent (P. Kartashov).
5. Kobellite (kobellite: 1841) 2.HB.10a
  (Pb_{11}(Cu,Fe)_{2}(Bi,Sb)_{15}S_{35})
6. Kobokoboite (IMA2009-057) 8.0 [no]
  (IUPAC: hexaaluminium hexahydro tetraphosphate undecahydrate)
7. Kobyashevite (IMA2011-066) 7.0 [no] [no]
  (IUPAC: pentacopper hexahydro disulfate tetrahydrate)
8. Kochite (seidozerite, rinkite: IMA2002-012) 9.BE.22 [no]
  (IUPAC: dicalcium manganese zirconium trisodium di(heptaoxodisilicate) (oxyfluoride) difluoride)
9. Kochkarite (aleksite: IMA1988-030) 2.GC.40b
  (IUPAC: lead tetrabismuth heptatelluride)
10. Kochsándorite (dundasite: IMA2004-037) 5.DB.10
  (IUPAC: calcium dialuminium tetrahydro dicarbonate monohydrate)
11. Kodamaite (IMA2018-134) 9.0 [no] [no]
12. Koechlinite (Y: 1914) 4.DE.15
  (IUPAC: dibismuth molybdenum hexaoxide)
13. Koenenite (Y: 1902) 3.BD.25
  (IUPAC: tetrasodium nonamagnesium tetraluminium docosahydro dodecachloride)
14. Kogarkoite (IMA1970-038) 7.BD.15
  (IUPAC: trisodium fluoro sulfate)
15. Kojonenite (IMA2013-132) 2.0 [no] [no]
  (Pd_{(7-x)}SnTe_{2} (0.3 ≤ x ≤ 0.8))
16. Kokchetavite (dmisteinbergite: IMA2004-011) 9.FA.75
  (IUPAC: potassium (aluminium octaoxytrisilicate))
17. Kokinosite (decavanadate: IMA2013-099) 4.0 [no]
  (Na_{2}Ca_{2}(V_{10}O_{28})·24H_{2}O)
18. Koksharovite (howardevansite: IMA2012-092) 8.0 [no]
  (IUPAC: calcium dimagnesium tetrairon(III) hexavanadate)
19. Koktaite (Y: 1948) 7.CD.35
  (IUPAC: diammonium calcium disulfate monohydrate)
20. Kolarite (IMA1983-081) 3.AA.45
  (IUPAC: palladium tellurium dichloride)
21. Kolbeckite (metavariscite: IMA1987 s.p., 1926) 8.CD.05
  (IUPAC: scandium phosphate dihydrate)
22. Kolfanite^{Q} (arseniosiderite: IMA1981-017) 8.DH.30
  (IUPAC: dicalcium triiron(III) dioxotriarsenate dihydrate)
  Note: possibly arseniosiderite.
23. Kolicite (IMA1978-076) 8.BE.60
  (IUPAC: tetrazinc heptamanganese(II) diarsenate di(tetraoxysilicate) octahydroxyl)
24. Kolitschite (alunite: IMA2008-063) 8.BM.10 [no] [no]
25. Kollerite (sulfite: IMA2018-131) 4.0 [no] [no]
26. Kolovratite^{Q} (Y: 1922) 8.CB.50
  ((Ni,Zn)_{x}(VO_{4})•nH_{2}O)
27. Kolskyite (seidozerite, murmanite: IMA2013-005) 9.B?. [no] [no]
  ((Ca,□)Na_{2}Ti_{4}(Si_{2}O_{7})_{2}O_{4}(H_{2}O)_{7})
28. Kolwezite (malachite: IMA1979-017) 5.BA.10
  (IUPAC: di(copper,cobalt) dihydro carbonate)
29. Kolymite (amalgam: IMA1979-046) 1.AD.10
  (IUPAC: heptacopper hexamercury amalgam)
30. Komarovite (IMA1971-011) 9.CE.45
31. Kombatite (IMA1985-056) 8.BO.20
  (IUPAC: tetradecalead tetrachloro nonaoxodivanadate)
32. Komkovite (IMA1988-032) 9.DM.10
  (IUPAC: barium zirconium nonaoxytrisilicate trihydrate)
33. Konderite (IMA1983-053) 2.DA.20
  (IUPAC: lead tricopper octarhodium hexadecasulfide)
34. Koninckite (Y: 1883) 8.CE.55
  (IUPAC: iron(III) phosphate trihydrate)
35. Kononovite (titanite: IMA2013-116) 7.0 [no] [no]
  (IUPAC: sodium magnesium fluoro sulfate)
36. Konyaite (picromerite: IMA1981-003) 7.CC.80
  (IUPAC: disodium magnesium disulfate pentahydrate)
37. Koragoite (IMA1994-049) 4.DE.10 [no]
38. Koritnigite (koritnigite: IMA1978-008) 8.CB.20
  (IUPAC: zinc hydroxoarsenate monohydrate)
39. Kornelite (Y: 1888) 7.CB.60
  (IUPAC: diron(III) trisulfate heptahydrate(?))
40. Kornerupine (Y: 1886) 9.BJ.50
41. Korobitsynite (labuntsovite: IMA1998-019) 9.CE.30a [no]
42. Korshunovskite (IMA1980-083) 3.BD.15
  (IUPAC: dimagnesium chloride trihydroxide tetrahydrate)
43. Koryakite (IMA2018-013) 7.0 [no] [no]
44. Korzhinskite (IMA1967 s.p., 1963) 6.GA.30
  (IUPAC: dicalcium octaoxotetraborate monohydrate)
45. Kosmochlor (pyroxene: IMA1988 s.p., 1897) 9.DA.25
  (IUPAC: sodium chromium hexaoxydisilicate)
46. Kosnarite (IMA1991-022) 8.AC.60
  (IUPAC: potassium dizirconium triphosphate)
47. Kostovite (calaverite: IMA1965-002) 2.EA.15
  (IUPAC: copper gold tetratelluride)
48. Kostylevite (IMA1982-053) 9.CJ.35
  (IUPAC: dipotassium zirconium nonaoxytrisilicate monohydrate)
49. Kotoite (Y: 1939) 6.AA.35
  (IUPAC: trimagnesium di(trioxoborate))
50. Kottenheimite (ettringite: IMA2011-038) 7.0 [no]
  (IUPAC: tricalcium silicium hexahydro disulfate dodecahydrate)
51. Köttigite (vivianite: 1850) 8.CE.40
  (IUPAC: trizinc diarsenate octahydrate)
52. Kotulskite (nickeline: IMA1967 s.p., 1963) 2.CC.05
  (Pd(Te,Bi)_{(2-x)} (x ≈ 0.4))
53. Koutekite (metalloid alloy: 1958) 2.AA.10d
  (IUPAC: pentacopper diarsenide)
54. Kovdorskite (IMA1979-066) 8.DC.22
  (IUPAC: dimagnesium hydro phosphate trihydrate)
55. Kozłowskiite (kristiansenite: IMA2021-081)
56. Kozoite (ancylite) 5.DC.05
  (IUPAC: REE hydro carbonate)
  1. Kozoite-(La) (IMA2002-054) 5.DC.05
  2. Kozoite-(Nd) (IMA1998-063) 5.DC.05 [no]
57. Kozyrevskite (IMA2013-023) 8.0 [no] [no]
  (IUPAC: tetracopper oxodiarsenate)

=== Kr – Ky ===
1. Kraisslite (hematolite: IMA1977-003) 8.BE.45
2. Krasheninnikovite (IMA2011-044) 7.0 [no] [no]
  (IUPAC: potassium disodium calcium magnesium trisulfate fluoride)
3. Krasnoshteinite (IMA2018-077) 6.0 [no] [no]
4. Krásnoite (IMA2011-040) 8.DO.20 [no] [no]
5. Krasnovite (IMA1991-020) 8.DK.35
6. Kratochvílite (Y: 1938) 10.BA.25
  (IUPAC: It is uncertain whether it is fluorene (C_{13}H_{10}) or anthracene (C_{14}H_{10}))
7. Krausite (Y: 1931) 7.CC.05
  (IUPAC: potassium iron(III) disulfate monohydrate)
8. Krauskopfite (IMA1964-008) 9.DH.30
  (IUPAC: barium pentaoxydisilicate trihydrate)
9. Krautite (koritnigite: IMA1974-028) 8.CB.15
  (IUPAC: manganese hydroxoarsenate monohydrate)
10. Kravtsovite (IMA2016-092) 2.0 [no] [no]
  (IUPAC: palladium disilver sulfide)
11. Kreiterite (IMA2019-041) 9.0 [no] [no]
12. Kremersite (Y: 1853) 3.CJ.10
  (IUPAC: diammonium iron(III) pentachloride monohydrate)
13. Krennerite (calaverite: 1878) 2.EA.15
  (IUPAC: trigold silver octatelluride)
14. Krettnichite (tsumcorite: IMA1998-044) 8.CG.15
  (IUPAC: lead dimanganese(III) dihydro divanadate)
15. Kribergite (Y: 1945) 8.DC.52
  (IUPAC: pentaluminium tetrahydro triphosphate sulfate tetrahydrate)
16. Krieselite (topaz: IMA2000-043a) 9.AF.20
  (IUPAC: dialuminium tetraoxogermanate dihydroxyl)
17. Krinovite (sapphirine: IMA1967-016) 9.DH.40
18. Kristiansenite (kristiansenite: IMA2000-051) 9.BC.30 [no]
  (IUPAC: dicalcium scandium tin heptaoxodisilicate hydroxyhexaoxydisilicate)
19. Krivovichevite (IMA2004-053) 7.BC.75
  (IUPAC: trilead aluminium hexahydroxide hydro sulfate)
20. Kröhnkite (Y: 1879) 7.CC.30
  (IUPAC: disodium copper disulfate dihydrate)
21. Krotite (beryllonite: IMA2010-038) 4.BC. [no] [no]
  (IUPAC: calcium dialuminium tetraoxide)
22. Kroupaite (IMA2017-031) 4.GA. [no] [no]
  (IUPAC: dipotassium lead [hexadecauranyl icosahydro octaoxide] icosahydrate)
23. Kruijenite (IMA2018-057) 8.0 [no] [no]
  (IUPAC: tetracalctetralumium difluoro hexadecahydro sulfate dihydrate)
24. Krupkaite (meneghinite: IMA1974-020) 2.HB.05a
  (PbCuBi_{3}S_{6})
25. Kruťaite (pyrite: IMA1972-001) 2.EB.05a
  (IUPAC: copper diselenide)
26. Krutovite (pyrite: IMA1975-009) 2.EB.25
  (IUPAC: nickel diarsenide)
27. Kryachkoite (alloy: IMA2016-062) 1.0 [no] [no]
  ((Al,Cu)_{6}(Fe,Cu))
28. Kryzhanovskite (reddingite: 1950) 8.CC.05
29. Ktenasite (ktenasite: 1950) 7.DD.20
  Note: probably a mineral group.
30. Kuannersuite-(Ce) (apatite: IMA2002-013) 8.BN.05
  (IUPAC: disodium dicerium hexabarium fluoro chloro hexaphosphate)
31. Kudriavite (IMA2003-011) 2.JA.05c
  ((Cd,Pb)Bi_{2}S_{4})
32. Kudryavtsevaite (IMA2012-078) 4.0 [no] [no]
  (IUPAC: trisodium magnesium iron(III) tetratitanium dodecaoxide)
33. Kufahrite (alloy: IMA2020-045) [no] [no]
  (IUPAC: platinum lead alloy)
34. Kukharenkoite 5.BD.10
  (IUPAC: dibarium REE fluoro tricarbonate)
  1. Kukharenkoite-(Ce) (IMA1995-040) 5.BD.10
  2. Kukharenkoite-(La) (IMA2002-019) 5.BD.10
35. Kukisvumite (IMA1989-052) 9.DB.20
  (IUPAC: hexasodium zinc tetratitanium tetraoxy octa(trioxysilicate) tetrahydrate)
36. Kuksite (dugganite: IMA1989-018) 8.DL.20
  (IUPAC: trilead trizinc hexaoxo tellurium(VI) diphosphate)
37. Kulanite (bjarebyite: IMA1975-012) 8.BH.20
  (IUPAC: barium diiron(II) dialuminium trihydro triphosphate)
38. Kuliginite (IMA2016-049) 3.0
  (IUPAC: triiron magnesium hexahydroxide dichloride)
39. Kuliokite-(Y) (IMA1984-064) 9.AG.50
  (IUPAC: tetrayttrium aluminium di(tetraoxysilicate) dihydroxyl pentafluoride)
40. Kulkeite (corrensite: IMA1980-031) 9.EC.60
  A 1:1 regular interstratification of a trioctahedral chlorite and talc.
41. Kullerudite (marcasite: IMA1967 s.p., 1964) 2.EB.10a
  (IUPAC: nickel diselenide)
42. Kumdykolite (feldspar: IMA2007-049) 9.FA.45
  (IUPAC: sodium (aluminium octaoxytrisilicate))
43. Kummerite (laueite, laueite: IMA2015-036) 8.0 [no] [no]
  (IUPAC: manganese(II) iron(III) aluminium dihydro diphosphate octahydrate)
44. Kumtyubeite (humite: IMA2008-045) 9.AF.45 [no]
  (IUPAC: pentacalcium di(tetraoxysilicate) difluoride)
45. Kunatite (arthurite: IMA2007-057) 8.DC.15 [no]
  (IUPAC: copper diiron(III) dihydro diphosphate tetrahydrate)
46. Kupčíkite (cuprobismutite: IMA2001-017) 2.JA.10b
  (Cu_{3.4}Fe_{0.6}Bi_{5}S_{10})
47. Kupletskite (astrophyllite, kupletskite) 9.DC.05
  1. Kupletskite (Y: 1956) 9.DC.05
  2. Kupletskite-(Cs) (IMA1970-009) 9.DC.05
48. Kuramite (stannite: IMA1979-013) 2.CB.15a
  (IUPAC: tricopper tin tetrasulfide)
49. Kuranakhite (tellurium oxysalt: IMA1974-030) 4.DM.25
  (IUPAC: lead manganese(IV) tellurium(VI) hexaoxide)
50. Kuratite (sapphirine: IMA2013-109) 9.D [no] [no]
51. Kurchatovite (IMA1965-034) 6.BA.10
  (IUPAC: calcium magnesium pentaoxodiborate)
52. Kurgantaite (hilgardite: IMA2000-B, 1952) 6.ED.05
  (IUPAC: calcium strontium chloro nonaoxopentaborate monohydrate)
53. Kurilite (IMA2009-080) 2.0
  (IUPAC: octasilver tritelluride selenide)
54. Kurnakovite (Y: 1940) 6.CA.20
  (IUPAC: magnesium pentahydro trioxotriborate pentahydrate)
55. Kurumsakite^{Q} (montmorillonite, smectite: 1954) 9.EC.40
56. Kusachiite (trippkeite: IMA1992-024) 4.JA.20
  (IUPAC: copper(II) dibismuth(III) tetraoxide)
57. Kushiroite (pyroxene: IMA2008-059) 9.DA.15 [no]
  (IUPAC: calcium aluminium aluminohexaoxysilicate)
58. Kutinaite (metalloid alloy: IMA1969-034) 2.AA.25
  (IUPAC: hexasilver tetradecacopper heptarsenide)
59. Kutnohorite (dolomite: 1903) 5.AB.10
  (IUPAC: calcium manganese(II) dicarbonate)
60. Kuvaevite (IMA2020-043) 2.0 [no] [no]
61. Kuzelite (hydrotalcite: IMA1996-053) 4.FL.15
  (IUPAC: tetracalcium dialuminium dodecahydroxide sulfate hexahydrate)
62. Kuzmenkoite (labuntsovite) 9.CE.30c
  1. Kuzmenkoite-Mn (IMA1998-058) 9.CE.30c [no]
  2. Kuzmenkoite-Zn (IMA2001-037) 9.CE.30c [no]
63. Kuzminite (IMA1986-005) 3.AA.30
  (IUPAC: dimercury di(bromide,chloride))
64. Kuznetsovite (IMA1980-009) 8.BO.35
  (IUPAC: (dimercury) mercury(II) arsenate chloride)
65. Kvanefjeldite (IMA1982-079) 9.DP.30
66. Kyanite (IMA1967 s.p., 1789) 9.AF.15
  (IUPAC: dialuminium oxo(tetraoxysilicate))
67. Kyanoxalite (cancrinite: IMA2008-041) 9.FB.05 [no]
68. Kyawthuite (IMA2015-078) 4.0 [no] [no]
  (IUPAC: bismuth(III) antimony(V) tetraoxide)
69. Kyrgyzstanite (chalcoalumite: IMA2004-024) 7.DD.75 [no]
  (IUPAC: zinc tetraluminium dodecahydro sulfate trihydrate)
70. Kyzylkumite (IMA1980-081) 4.CB.75
  (IUPAC: dititanium vanadium(III) hydro pentaoxide)
