= Beraunite =

Iron phosphate mineral

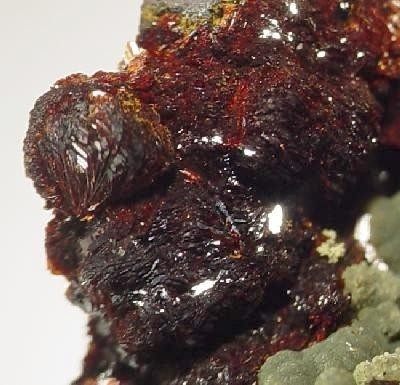
- Crystalline beraunite on green kidwellite, Coon Creek Mine, Polk County, Arkansas, US. Size: 3.4 × 3.3 × 2.8 cm

General
- Category: Phosphate minerals
- Formula: Fe^{2+} Fe^{3+}_{5}(OH)_{5}(PO_{4})_{4}·4H_{2}O
- IMA symbol: Bru
- Strunz classification: 8.DC.27
- Crystal system: Monoclinic
- Crystal class: Prismatic (2/m) (same H-M symbol)
- Space group: C2/c
- Unit cell: a = 20.953(8) Å, b = 5.171(1) Å, c = 19.266(4) Å; β = 93.34°; Z = 4

Identification
- Color: Dull greenish to greenish brown when fresh, may be color banded; reddish brown to hyacinth-red, blood-red on exposure
- Crystal habit: Tabular crystals common, may be in coarse radially fibrous aggregates, globular or discoidal, and in crusts
- Twinning: On {100}, may be interpenetrant
- Cleavage: On {100}, good
- Mohs scale hardness: 3–4
- Luster: Vitreous, pearly on cleavages, resinous on fractures
- Streak: Olive-drab when fresh; yellow, brownish yellow on exposure
- Diaphaneity: Translucent
- Specific gravity: 2.8–3.08 (measured); 2.894 (calculated)
- Optical properties: Biaxial (+)
- Refractive index: n_{α} = 1.775 n_{β} = 1.786 n_{γ} = 1.815
- Birefringence: δ = 0.040
- Pleochroism: X = pale flesh-pink, yellow, blue-green; Y = pale flesh-pink, yellow, pale olive-green; Z = carnelian-red, reddish brown, olive-green.
- 2V angle: Measured: 30° to 60°, Calculated: 66°

Beraunite is an iron phosphate mineral. It was first described by August Breithaupt for an occurrence in Beraun currently in the Czech Republic. Beraunite occurs as a secondary mineral in iron ore deposits, and as an alteration product of primary phosphate minerals in granite pegmatites.

Beraunite crystallizes in the monoclinic crystal system with point group 2/m. Beraunite's formula is Fe^{2+} Fe^{3+}_{5}(OH)_{5}(PO_{4})_{4}·4H_{2}O. Aluminium and zinc may substitute in the structure.

== Occurrence ==
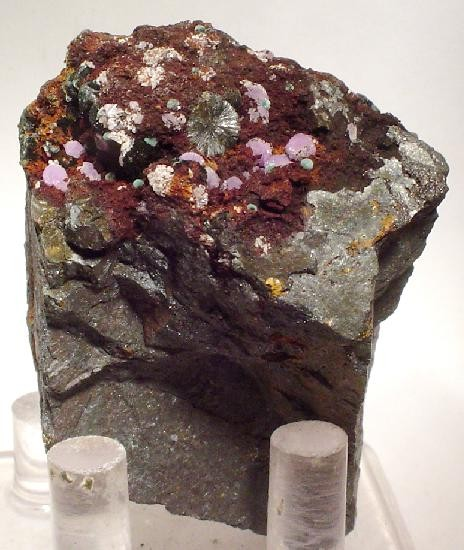
Rosettes of colorless beraunite with lavender spheres of strengite on massive hematite, Leveäniemi Mine, Svappavaara, Sweden. Overall size 5.5 × 4.5 × 3.8 cm.

Beraunite occurs as a secondary mineral in iron ore deposits and as an alteration product of primary phosphates minerals in granite pegmatites. It is found as an alteration product of triphylite at the Big Chief and Hesnard mines, Keystone, Pennington County, South Dakota, New Hampshire, in Arkansas, New Jersey and Pennsylvania in the United States. It is also found in Ireland, Germany, and the Czech Republic.

== Structure ==
It occurs as fibrous greenish-black to brown nodules. The chemical analysis of beraunite often show small and irrational amounts of ferrous iron. The chain segments in Beraunite are one and two octahedral in length. Beraunite has two different types which are Zn-rich and Al-rich Beraunites, those two types have variations in data between those taken by Krsano in the X-ray powder diffraction experiment and those in the literature. Phosphate minerals have special characteristics about their chemical composition. The polyatomic complex of iron-oxygen octahedral face is sharing triplets corner to four other octahedral in the arrangement of atoms of the basic iron phosphates like dufrenite, rockbridgeite, and Beraunite. This complex is linked together by the phosphate tetrahedra.
