= Mesaite =

General
- Category: Minerals
- Formula: CaMn^{2+}_{5}(V_{2}O_{7})_{3}•12H_{2}O

Mesaite is a very rare mineral with formula CaMn^{2+}_{5}(V_{2}O_{7})_{3}•12H_{2}O. It is monoclinic (space group P2/n). It is related to fianelite, another manganese-rich divanadate. Examples of other divanadate minerals are volborthite, engelhauptite, karpenkoite, and martyite.
