= Fianelite =

General
- Category: Vanadate
- Formula: Mn_{2}V(V,As)O_{7} · 2H_{2}O
- IMA symbol: Fnl
- Strunz classification: 08.FC.05
- Crystal system: Monoclinic
- Crystal class: 2/m
- Space group: P2_{1}/n
- Unit cell: a = 7.809;Å, b = 14.554;Å c = 6.705 Å, β = 93.27(3)◦

Identification
- Color: Orange-Red
- Crystal habit: Platy
- Twinning: None observed
- Cleavage: Good on {001} and {100}
- Mohs scale hardness: 3
- Luster: Vitreous
- Diaphaneity: Transparent
- Specific gravity: 3.22 gm/cc
- Density: 3.21 g/cm^{3}
- Refractive index: 1.85±0.02
- Birefringence: δ=1.820
- Dispersion: Good

Fianelite is a mineral belonging to the manganese vanadate category, found in iron-manganese ores. Named after the place where it was found, Fianel, a mine located in Val Ferrera (Ferrera valley), in the canton of Graubünden, Swiss. This mineral is found in small amounts in metamorphosed iron-manganese ores. This is the last crystallization of vanadate at the site since medaite was the last vanadate mineral being crystallized, but because of retrograde metamorphism, occurring at the place, vanadium moved into medaite veinlets, forming cross-cutting fianelite on medaite.

== Occurrence ==
This mineral is found in the Suretta nappe which is composed of three main units going from a quartzite base to dolomitic and calcitic marble, to a calcschist top. Fianelite is only found at the Triassic dolomitic and calcitic marbles unit which contains metamorphosed iron and manganese ores. Fianelite is found as small fractures of less than 1 mm in size in association with quartz, aegirine, and iron hydroxide-oxides like limonite. These fractures are found cross-cutting veinlets, which are made out of quartz, rhodonite, kutnohorite, aegirine, parsettensite, and different vanadium minerals, that are at the same time cross-cutting lenses of medaite-rich rocks which are found in the iron and manganese ores.

== Physical properties ==
Fianelite's crystals grow in polycrystalline crusts and rosettes that can measure up to 2.5 mm in diameter, and when strangely found as single crystals, they can measure up to 0.2 mm in diameter. It presents good parallel cleavage on {001} and {100}. The single crystals resent a platy habit and striations parallel to the a-axis. VHN values were measured and used to determine a Mohs hardness of approximately 3.

== Optical properties ==
Fianelite is an orange-red mineral with a vitreous luster and orange streak. Its crystals are transparent with striations parallel to the a-axis. The crystals are biaxial, so they have two optic axes meaning that they will split light rays into two. The angle between the two optic axes is less than 10°. It shows a strong pleochroism on (010) displaying different colors from yellow to red.

== Chemical properties ==
The empirical formula for fianelite is Mn_{1.98}(V_{1.57}As_{0.44}Si_{0.01})O_{7}·2H_{2}O. Manganese dioxide (MnO_{6}) and manganese trioxide (MnO_{2}O_{6}) are found in chains of octahedrons that are connected by two tetrahedrons of orthovanadate (VO_{4}), from which one of them bonds with arsenic.

== Chemical composition ==
| Oxide | Wt% |
|---|---|
| V_{2}O_{5} | 38.23 |
| As_{2}O_{5} | 13.57 |
| SiO_{2} | 0.12 |
| MnO | 37.49 |
| Total | 89.41 |
| H_{2}O | 9.64 |
| Total | 99.05 |

== X-ray crystallography ==
Fianelite belongs to the monoclinic crystal system with a space group of P2_{1}/n. The unit cell dimensions are a = 7.809(2) b = 14.554(4) c = 6.705(4) β = 93.27(3)◦ Z=4

| d-spacing | Intensity | hkl |
|---|---|---|
| 3.039 | 100 | 022 |
| 5.32 | 80 | 120 |
| 2.721 | 60 | 231 |
| 1.593 | 60 | 163 |
| 3.436 | 50 | 220 |
| 3.259 | 50 | 012 |
| 2.573 | 50 | 212̅ |
| 2.444 | 50 | 320 |

== See also ==
- List of minerals
