= Kidwellite =

Rare phosphate mineral

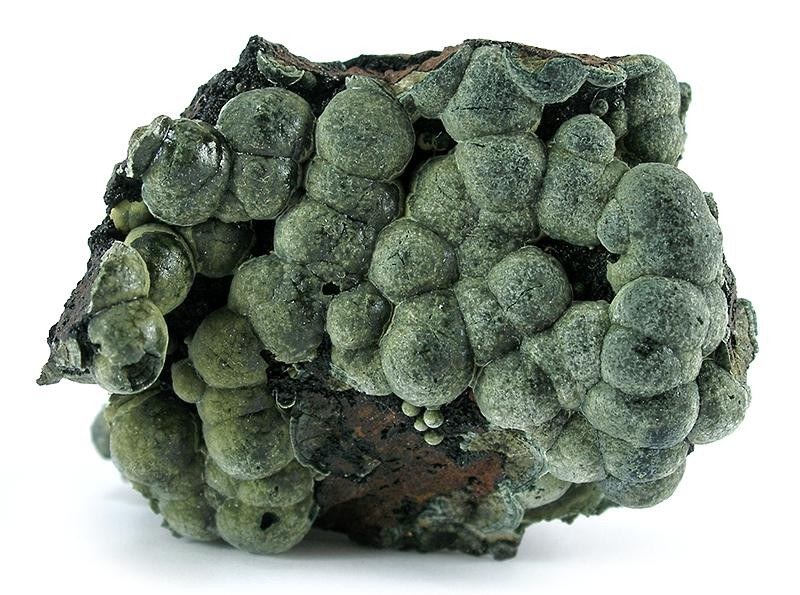

General
- Category: Minerals
- Formula: NaFe^{3+}_{9+x}(PO_{4})_{6}(OH)_{4}·12H_{2}O (x ≈ 0.33)
- IMA symbol: Kdw
- Strunz classification: 08.DK.20
- Dana classification: 42.08.02.01
- Crystal system: Monoclinic
- Crystal class: Prismatic; H-M Symbol: 2/m
- Space group: P2/c
- Unit cell: 1,393.77

Identification
- Formula mass: 1,368.34
- Color: Greenish white, light green, greenish yellow, yellow
- Cleavage: Perfect on {100}
- Fracture: Splintery
- Mohs scale hardness: 3
- Luster: Resinous, waxy, silky, dull
- Streak: Yellow
- Diaphaneity: Translucent
- Specific gravity: 3.04 – 3.3
- Density: Measured: 3.04 – 3.3; Calculated: 3.34
- Optical properties: Biaxial (−)
- Refractive index: n_{α} = 1.787 n_{β} = 1.800 n_{γ} = 1.805
- Birefringence: 0.018
- Pleochroism: None
- Dispersion: Extreme
- Ultraviolet fluorescence: None
- Common impurities: Aluminum, Copper, Arsenic

Kidwellite in an uncommon mineral that was discovered in Arkansas in the United States. It was approved by the IMA in 1974, but it was only named in 1978 by Moore and Ito after Albert Lewis (Laws) Kidwell.

== Properties ==
Kidwellite usually has a botyroidal or acicular crystal habit. The luster of these spherical aggregates is usually matte and has a velvety surface. However, it can grow fibrous columnar crystals, although that form is much rarer. Because of the similarities in hardness, color, and crystal habit, it can be confused with the sodium analogue of meurigite. An easy way to differentiate the two is that meurigite-Na has a white streak, while kidwellite has a yellow one. The mineral does not display radioactive properties. Kidwellite mainly consists of oxygen (44.43%) and iron (36.73%) but otherwise consists of phosphorus (13.58%). It also has a small amount of copper (2.32%), sodium (1.68%) and hydrogen (1.25%). When originally described by Moore and Ito in 1978, the two researchers reported the mineral to crystallize in either A2/m, Am or A2 space group, which was later found out to be incorrect, as demonstrated by the structure solution.

According to one sample, it can be slightly arsenic bearing as well. The slightly arsenic samples were collected from the Clara Pit, Black Forest, Germany. This study was executed by the author of the journal, Uwe Kolitsch. He claimed the data to be similar to Walenta's results in 1990 executed on the samples from the same locality. The specimens obtained from Clara Pit bearing arsenic can be explained easily, as many arsenic bearing minerals can be found in the mine. Other impurities include aluminum and copper. Comparing his findings with Moore's and Ito's, the author suggested revising both the chemical formula and the symmetry. It was accepted by the IMA, as both the formula and the space group is now the same as what Kolitsch described in his findings.

== Oriented intergrowths ==
Several authors reported kidwellite having epitaxial intergrowths with iron phosphates. In the Rotläufchen mine, Germany, Dietrich found kidwellite needles on the face of hydrothermally altered rockbridgeite in 1978. Keller reported a similar finding from Namibia in 1985, where he discovered older rockbridgeites with oriented overgrowths of fibrous kidwellite on it. In 1995, Walenta described dufrénite crystals that grade into kidwellite at their tip. The aforementioned mineralogist – among Theye – in 2001, observed the fibrous kidwellite grading into laubmannite. The similarities between the structure of kidwellite and laubmannite, and other fibrous iron phosphates, explains the reported epitaxial intergrowths.

== Discovery and locality ==
Kidwellite was described from novaculite deposits in Arkansas by Moore and Ito. Even though there are numerous occurrences of the mineral, kidwellite does not have mamy more studies on it other than the one made by the two aforementioned mineralogists. It is a late-stage or a secondary mineral. It usually occurs in phosphate-bearing iron deposits, as a replacement of beraunite and rockbridgeite. Kidwellite can be found in Arkansas, US, in the Coon Creek mine and the Three Oak Gap in Polk County. It can also be found in Alabama, Brazil, Namibia, England, Germany, Australia, and a few more countries. It can be associated with rockbridgeite, beraunite, strengite, cacoxenite, chalcosiderite, eleonorite, and dufrénite.
