= Kegginite =

General
- Category: Phosphate
- Formula: Pb_{3}Ca_{3} [ AsV_{12}O_{40}(VO) ] * 20 H_{2}O
- IMA symbol: Kgn
- Strunz classification: 8.FD.10
- Crystal system: Trigonal
- Crystal class: 3 - Pyramidal
- Unit cell: a = 14.936 Å, c = 15.846 Å;

Identification
- Color: Orange-Red
- Cleavage: Distinct/Good on {001}
- Fracture: Irregular/Uneven
- Tenacity: Brittle
- Mohs scale hardness: 2
- Luster: Vitreous
- Streak: Pinkish - Orange
- Density: 2.69 g/cm^{3}
- Optical properties: Uniaxial
- Refractive index: n_{α}= 2.035 n_{β}= 2.040 n_{γ}= 2.085
- Pleochroism: Visible
- Ultraviolet fluorescence: Not Fluorescent
- Solubility: Insoluble in H_{2}O and soluble at room temperature in HCl

Kegginite is a phosphate mineral discovered in Packrat mine near Gateway, Colorado. This specific mineral is very rare, and has only been found in one specific level of the Packrat mine. Kegginite is named as such due to the presence of the ε-isomer of the Keggin anion as the basis of the structural unit. It also recognizes the work of J.F. Keggin who first experimentally described the structure of the α-Keggin anions in 1934. At the time of its discovery it represented a new crystal structure type and was the first mineral discovered with a vanadyl-containing polyoxometalate anion.

== Physical and optical properties ==
Crystals of kegginite are orange-red hexagonal tablets. The crystals are transparent vitreous and have a pinkish-orange streak. Kegginite is non-fluorescent in long wave and short wave ultraviolet light. It exhibits a 2 on the Mohs Scale of Hardness, with brittle tenacity, irregular fracture, and good cleavage on {001}. Due to the very limited amount of crystals available, their size, and dark color make it impossible to obtain reliable measurements of the indices of refraction.

== Chemical analysis ==
Oxide	wt%	Range
PbO	26.82	26.98-29.27
CaO	5.39	5.59-5.75
MgO	0.92	0.93-0.99
V_{2}O_{5}	47.87	49.01-51.30
As_{2}O_{5}	4.42	4.38-4.80
H_{2}O	14.59	
Total	100.01	

== Occurrence ==
Kegginite has been found in the main tunnel level of the Packrat mine, near Gateway, Mesa County, Colorado, U.S.A. The Packrat Mine is near the northern end of the Uravan Mineral Belt. Kegginite is very rare, it has been found sparingly on only a few small samples but often in association with ansermetite, gypsum, mesaite, and sherwoodite. Kegginite forms from the oxidation of montroseite-corvusite assembleges in moist environments.

== Structure ==
Due to the high amounts of H_{2}O contained within Kegginite, it defracts relatively weakly leading to being limited to 2θ < 40°. However, a defined structure has been identified and is broken into two distinct parts, a structural unit and an interstitial complex. The structural unit is a heteropolyanion composed of 12 distorted VO_{6} octahedra surrounding a central AsO_{4} (arsenate) tetrahedron and capped by a VO_{4} (vanadate) tetrahedron, which shares three of its four vertices with the VO_{6} octahedra. Without the capping tetrahedron, the heteropolyanion is the ε-isomer of the Keggin anion. The formula of the interstitial unit is [Pb_{3}Ca_{3}·20H_{2}O]^{12+}. The Pb site is located above each of the remaining cavities located in the mono-capped Keggin anion.
