= Kainotropite =

Rare vanadate mineral

General
- Category: Vanadate
- Formula: Cu_{4}Fe^{3+}O_{2}(V_{2}O_{7})(VO_{4})
- IMA symbol: Ktr
- Crystal system: Orthorhombic
- Crystal class: Dipyramidal (mmm); H-M symbol: (2/m 2/m 2/m)
- Space group: Pnma
- Unit cell: a = 14.14, b = 6.71 c = 11.42 [Å], β = 93.04° (approximated)

Identification

Kainotropite is a rare vanadate mineral with the formula Cu_{4}FeO_{2}(V_{2}O_{7})(VO_{4}). It contains trivalent iron. It is one of many fumarolic minerals discovered on the Tolbachik volcano. The name of its parental fumarole is "Yadovitaya", which means poisonous.

== Relation to other minerals ==
Structure of kainotropite is unique. However, there are other minerals containing both copper and divanadate group, like engelhauptite and volborthite.
