= Alexander von Volborth =

Russian paleontologist

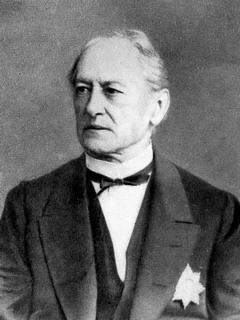
Alexander von Volborth

Alexander von Volborth/Aleksandr Fedorovich von Volborth (born 1800, Mogilev - died 1876, Kiev), was a Russian palaeontologist. Volborthite, a mineral containing copper and vanadium and first found in 1838 at the Sofronovskii Copper Mine near Perm in the Urals, was named after him.

== Biography ==
Alexander Folbort was born on January 11 (22), 1800 in the city Mogilev into the family of a pastor, Dr. Friedrich Folbort and Evdokia Kurganskaya, a daughter of a Russian priest. At the end of the course at Peter and Paul School in University of Berlin degree of Doctor of Medicine and Surgery.

He returned to the Russian capital, Folbort, after passing the exam at the Imperial Medical and Surgical Academy, in 1827 he entered the service at the Mariinsky Hospital.

Later, Alexander Fedorovich Folbort worked at the Obukhov hospital, from which he was transferred to serve in the maritime department for the medical unit. In 1833, Folbort, following an exam at IMSA, was promoted to the rank of adjunct professor, and in 1844 he was appointed an intern at the St. Petersburg Naval Hospital and held this position until 1848. On June 11, 1847, he was granted the rank of State Councilor.

In 1851, A.F. Folbort was appointed to the 1st flipper crew, and in 1854 he was dismissed from service for family reasons. The reason for his leaving the medical service was that Folbort from a young age had a passion for natural sciences and medicine seemed to him only a necessary aid in their study.

In the 1830s, A. Folbort began to zealously engage in mineralogy and compiled a rich mineralogical collection. Mineralogy owes him the discovery he made in 1838 of vanadium-acid copper, which forms a rare, but now well-known mineral, which was named by Academician Hess "folbortite" in honor of the scientist.

Folbort then took up paleontology and subsequently devoted the rest of his life to it; this was facilitated by his summer stays in Pavlovsk, the surroundings of which, rich in plate fractures, cliffs and profiles of the Earth's crust, provided him with rare material for his scientific studies. Folbort collected an extensive collection of fossils of the Lower Silurian system in the vicinity of St. Petersburg. According to the wish expressed by Folbort, the paleontological collection he had collected over the course of 40 years, as well as the extensive mineralogical collection, after his death, entered the Imperial Academy of Sciences, which decided to store them in its mineralogical museum separately under the name " Collections of A.F. Folbort».

Folbort's services to Russian science were especially manifested in the field of paleontology, one of the most prominent figures of which he is recognized by all. In honor of him, the famous paleontologist V. I. Meller named in 1873 a new species of fossil brachiopods "Volborthia".

Folbort's special works are published in the editions of Imperial Mineralogical Society and Petersburg Academy of Sciences, of which he was elected a corresponding member in 1863.

Folbort was also an active member of the Mineralogical Society and in 1868 he was elected an honorary member. In addition, from September 17, 1846, he was a full member of the Moscow Society of Naturalists, from December 23, 1846, a full member of the Imperial Russian Geographical Society, and from 4 October 1873, an indispensable member of the Society of Lovers of Natural Science, Anthropology and Ethnography, which is affiliated with Imperial Moscow University.

In the "Collection of the St. Petersburg Mineralogical Society" for 1867, his study "On cystoblasts, a new genus of sea lilies" was placed, and in the "Notes of the St. Petersburg Mineralogical Society" for 1870 - "On a new layer in Silurian system of St. Petersburg province and many others. dr.

Alexander Fedorovich Folbort died on March 5 (17), 1876 in the city of St. Petersburge. Buried at Volkovskoye Lutheran Cemetery.
