= Krutovite =

Cubic nickel diarsenide

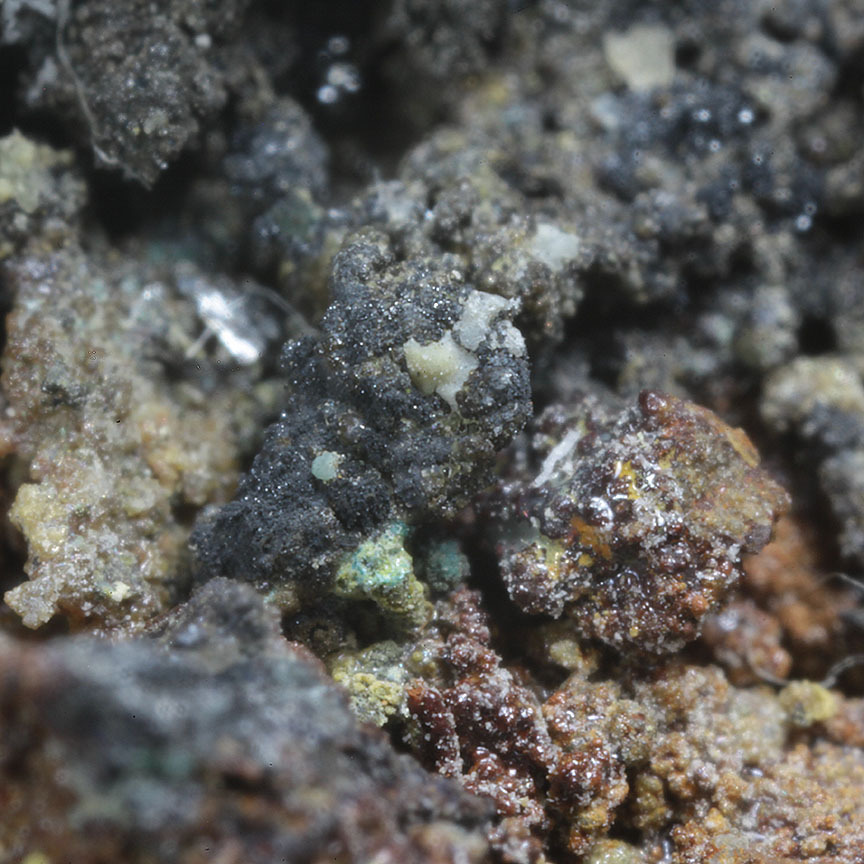
- Krutovite. Dimensions: 5.6 x 4.9 x 3.2 cm. Locality: Svornost Mine (Einigkeit Mine), Jáchymov, Karlovy Vary District, Karlovy Vary Region, Czech Republic

General
- Category: Arsenide mineral
- Formula: NiAs_{2}
- IMA symbol: Kru
- Strunz classification: 2.EB.25
- Crystal system: Cubic
- Crystal class: Tetartoidal (23)
- Space group: Isometric; H-M symbol: (23); Space group: P2_{1}3
- Unit cell: 5.79 Å; Z = 4

Identification
- Color: grayish white, bright white with a rose tint in polished section
- Crystal habit: Granular, intergrown with other sulfides
- Cleavage: not observed
- Fracture: Conchoidal
- Mohs scale hardness: 5.5
- Luster: metallic
- Diaphaneity: Opaque
- Specific gravity: 7.08–7.12 calculated
- Pleochroism: None

Krutovite is a cubic nickel diarsenide with a chemical composition of NiAs_{2} and a sulfur content of 0.02-0.34 weight percent. Krutovite is composed of nickel and arsenic with trace to minor amounts of cobalt, iron, copper, sulfur, and antimony.

== Geological occurrence ==
Krutovite occurs in the Geshiber vein, Svornost shaft, 8th level, in the northwest strike of Jáchymov, Czech Republic, in the Ore Mountains. The Ore Mountains are composed of two parts: the Precambrian metamorphic rocks and the Lower Paleozoic metamorphic volcano sedimentary sequence. The surrounding area lies on fault zones where many minerals develop. The Potůčky ore district where krutovite was originally found lies on the northern fault zone. Heading south is the Ore Mountains fault zone which surrounds the district of the Jáchymov. The western border is the Central Fault and the eastern border is formed by the Plavno Fault. Veins come from the major fault lines where krutovite crystallized at moderate hydrothermal temperatures. The veins can be classified into two categories: the morning veins striking along the east and west fault zone and the midnight veins striking from north to south. Krutovite comes from the midnight vein in the Svornmost mine which contains nickel ores as deep as 100 meters in the granite body. The midnight veins are known to exhibit frequent variations in their strike and dip and have an average width of 10–30 cm. In addition to nickel being mined here, silver, bismuth, and uranium were also found in the 19th century. Krutovite forms grains up to 0.1 mm in isometric or irregular form and has also been known to occur intergrowth with nickel skutterudite and sometimes with tennantite. When this occurs the intergrowth is smooth and there is no visible reaction.

== Structure ==
Krutovite is from the family of the isometric-dipoloidal system (2/m3̅) and is known to have the same structure type as gersdorffite type P2_{1}3. Krutovite and gersdorffite form a solid solution at a temperature of less than 300 °C (572 °F).

== Physical properties ==
Krutovite is opaque grayish white paler then the color of nickel skutterudite. In reflected light the mineral has a vivid white with a rosy tint. It has a hardness of 5.5 on the Mohs scale and a metallic luster. No cleavage is observed. Krutovite has high degree of reflectance about 64.0-67.0% higher than known nickel arsenides and sulfarsenides. The spectrum of reflectance that occurs in krutovite has a wavelength range of 440-1100 and a minimum of 480-540 nm. The rose tint gives the small increase of reflectance in the violent and red parts of the spectrum.

== Biographic sketch ==
Kruotvite was named in honor of Georgi Alekseyevich Krutov (24 April 1902 - 11 December 1989) who was a professor of mineralogy of Moscow University in Russia. Krutov graduated at the Geology Prospecting Faculty of the Moscow Mining Academy in 1931. He studied the Co-Ni deposits in the Urals and Kazakhstan; cobalt in Dashkesan deposit, nickel in silicate ores in ultramafic massifs of the Southern Ural, the Cu-Ni (Co) deposits of Norilsk in the Kranoyarsk region and Monchegorsk in Karelia. Krutov determined the significance of chlorine in the development of contact-metasomatic deposits, which are found in the distribution of amphiboles, scapolite, and chlorapatite. One of Krutov’s great achievements is a monograph: Ore Deposits of Cobalt which included cobalt and nickel ores in the Krusnehory Mountains and was published in 1959.
