= Volborthite =

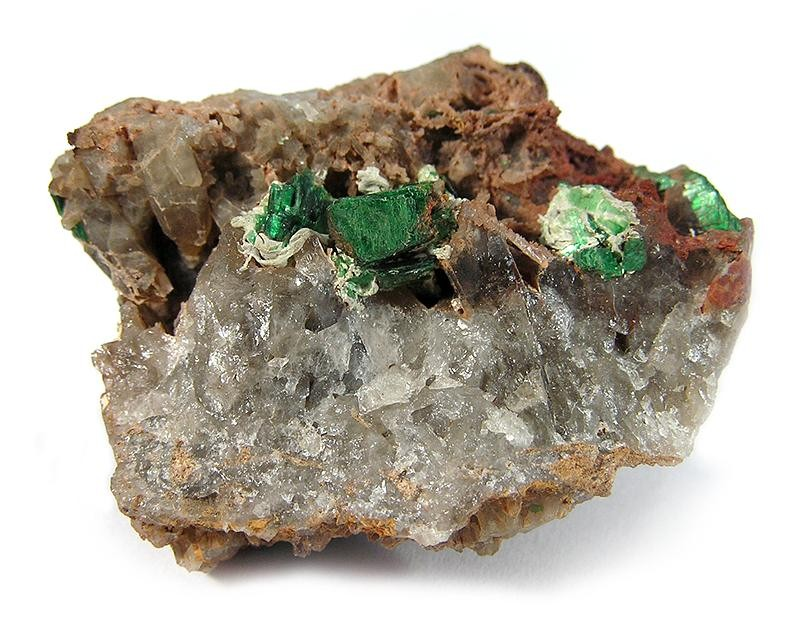
- Neon green crystals of volborthite are nestled in a vug in the matrix

General
- Category: Polyvanadate minerals
- Formula: Cu_{3}V_{2}O_{7}(OH)_{2}·2H_{2}O
- IMA symbol: Vbo
- Strunz classification: 8.FD.05
- Dana classification: 40.03.10.01
- Crystal system: Monoclinic
- Crystal class: Prismatic (2/m) (same H-M symbol)
- Space group: C2/m
- Unit cell: a = 10.610(2) Å, b = 5.866(1) Å c = 7.208(1) Å; β = 95.04(2)°; Z = 2

Identification
- Color: Olive-green, yellow-green; green to yellow-green in transmitted light
- Crystal habit: Aggregates of scaly crystals, rosettes
- Cleavage: Perfect
- Mohs scale hardness: 3 1/2
- Luster: Vitreous, waxy, greasy, pearly
- Streak: light green
- Diaphaneity: Translucent
- Specific gravity: 3.5 - 3.8
- Optical properties: Biaxial (+/-)
- Refractive index: n_{α} = 1.793 n_{β} = 1.801 n_{γ} = 1.816
- Birefringence: δ = 0.023
- Pleochroism: Weak
- 2V angle: Measured: 63° to 83°
- Dispersion: Translucent to Subtranslucent
- Ultraviolet fluorescence: Non-fluorescent
- Solubility: Soluble in acids

Volborthite is a mineral containing copper and vanadium, with the formula Cu_{3}V_{2}O_{7}(OH)_{2}·2H_{2}O. Found originally in 1838 in the Urals, it was first named knaufite but was later changed to volborthite for Alexander von Volborth (1800–1876), a Russian paleontologist.

Tangeite (synonym: calciovolborthite), CaCuVO_{4}(OH), is closely related.

== Occurrence ==
Volborthite was first described in 1837 for an occurrence in the Sofronovskii Mine, Yugovskii Zavod, Perm, Permskaya Oblast, Middle Urals, Russia.

It occurs as an uncommon oxidation mineral in vanadium bearing hydrothermal copper ores. It is associated with brochantite, malachite, atacamite, tangeite, chrysocolla, baryte and gypsum.
