= Klöchite =

General
- Category: Osumilite
- Formula: K◻2(Fe2+Fe3+)Zn3[Si12O30]
- IMA symbol: Klö
- Strunz classification: 9.CM.05 9 : Silicates C : Cyclosilicates M : [Si6O18]12- 6-membered double rings
- Crystal system: Hexagonal
- Crystal class: 6/mmm (6/m 2/m 2/m) - Dihexagonal Dipyramidal
- Space group: P6/mcc
- Unit cell: a = 10.120 Å, c = 14.298 Å

Identification
- Color: Blue, Bright Orange
- Cleavage: None Observed
- Luster: Vitreous
- Specific gravity: 3.007
- Density: 3.007 g/cm3
- Optical properties: Uniaxial negative
- Refractive index: n_{ω} = 1.594 n_{ε} = 1.590

Klöchite is a cyclosilicate mineral of the Osumilite Group, found in a basalt quarry in Klöch, Austria. The basalt quarry it was found in is part of the Styrian Basin Volcanic Field in south-eastern Austria. Klöchite was found to be hosted in a xenolith primarily composed of quartz, sanidine, and diopside. Very few vesicles in the xenolith held Klöchite crystals, and only two samples were taken for study.

== Occurrence ==
Klöchite was found at the Klöch volcano in south-east Austria. The town of Klöch has a basalt mine, where a SiO_{2}-rich xenolith protrudes. Small vesicles in the xenolith are found to host titanite, enstatite, forsterite, and other minerals including klöchite. Klöchite has also been found in the town of Porto da Cruz, Madeira, Portugal, in a gabbro outcrop.

== Physical properties ==
Klöchite is seen as a flattened, hexagonal crystal. It has a maximum thickness of 0.01 mm and diameter of 0.3 mm. Due to a limited amount of samples, the streak and hardness were not determined for Klöchite.

== Optical properties ==
Klöchite has a blue coloring, with a vitreous luster. It is also found to be translucent and is not fluorescent.

== Chemical composition ==
Element	wt%	Range
Si	29.29	28.84 - 29.55
Zn	14.91	14.16 - 15.81
Fe	8.46	7.89 2 - 8.79
K	2.64	2.53 - 2.67
Mn	1.31	1.22 2 - 1.39
Na	1.09	0.88 - 1.51

== X-ray crystallography ==
Limited samples of Klöchite mean that powder x-ray diffraction was not able to be performed, but the group of scientists who discovered the mineral performed a simulated powder diffraction. Single crystal X-ray diffraction was carried out, and the space group P6/mcc was determined from the intensity and absences in the data. The simulated diffraction was compared to x-ray diffraction data of milarite group mineral darapiosite. Klöchite's crystal structure has a silicate tetrahedral ring structure like other cyclosilicates, with iron cation octahedra and zinc atoms connecting the silicate rings.

== See also ==
- List of minerals
