= Tangeite =

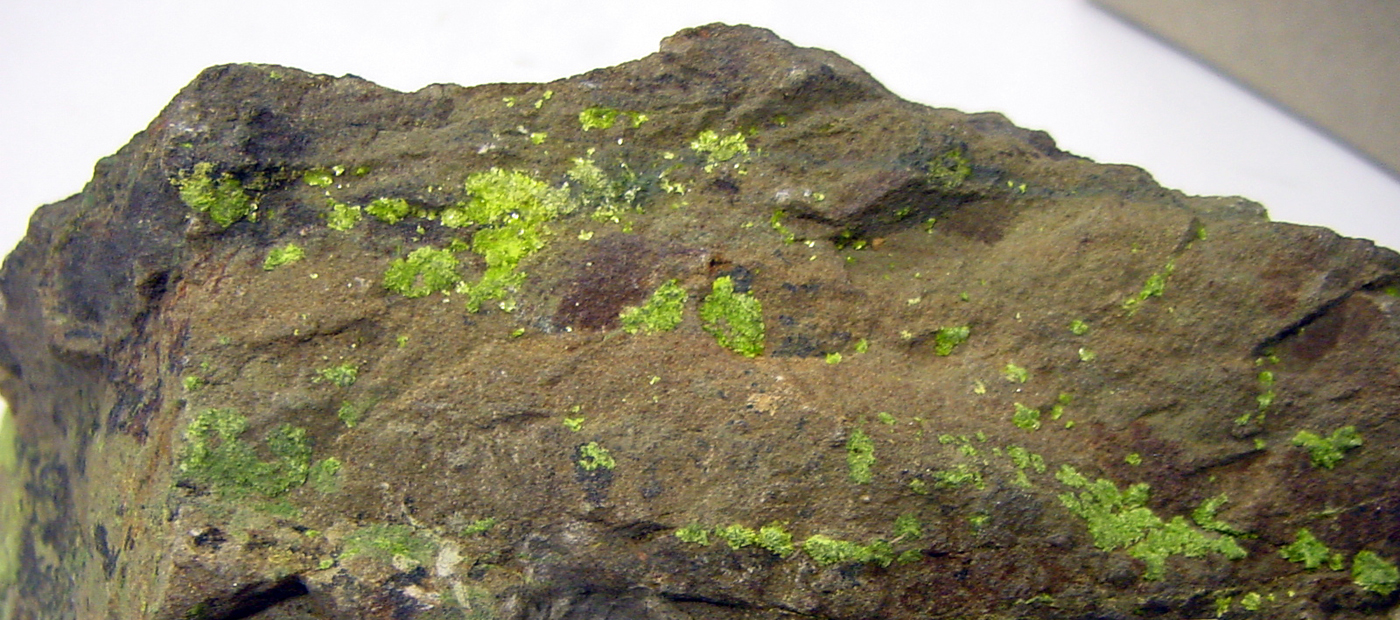

General
- Category: Phosphate mineral
- Formula: CaCu(VO_{4})(OH)
- IMA symbol: Tg
- Strunz classification: 8.BH.35
- Dana classification: 41.05.01.06
- Crystal system: Orthorhombic
- Crystal class: Disphenoidal (222); H-M symbol: (2 2 2)
- Space group: P2_{1}2_{1}2_{1}
- Unit cell: a = 7.45 Å, b = 9.26 Å c = 5.91 Å; Z = 4

Identification
- Color: Yellow, yellow-green, olive green, green to dark green
- Crystal habit: Rarely as short prismatic crystals, commonly as fibrous to botryoidal encrustations
- Cleavage: Perfect on {010}, good on {001}
- Tenacity: Brittle
- Mohs scale hardness: 3.5
- Luster: Vitreous, pearly on cleavage faces
- Streak: Light yellow green
- Diaphaneity: Transparent, Translucent
- Specific gravity: 3.75 - 3.84
- Optical properties: Biaxial (-)
- Refractive index: n_{α} = 2.010 n_{β} = 2.050 n_{γ} = 2.090
- Birefringence: 0.08
- 2V angle: 83° (measured)

Tangeite, also known as calciovolborthite, is a calcium, copper vanadate mineral with formula: CaCu(VO_{4})(OH). It occurs as a secondary mineral that can be found in sandstone and also in the oxidized zones of vanadium bearing deposits.

It was named in 1925 by Aleksandr Evgenievich Fersman for its discovery locality in the Tange Gorge, Ferghana Valley, Alai Mountains, Kyrgyzstan.
