= Kenhsuite =

Halide-sulfide mineral

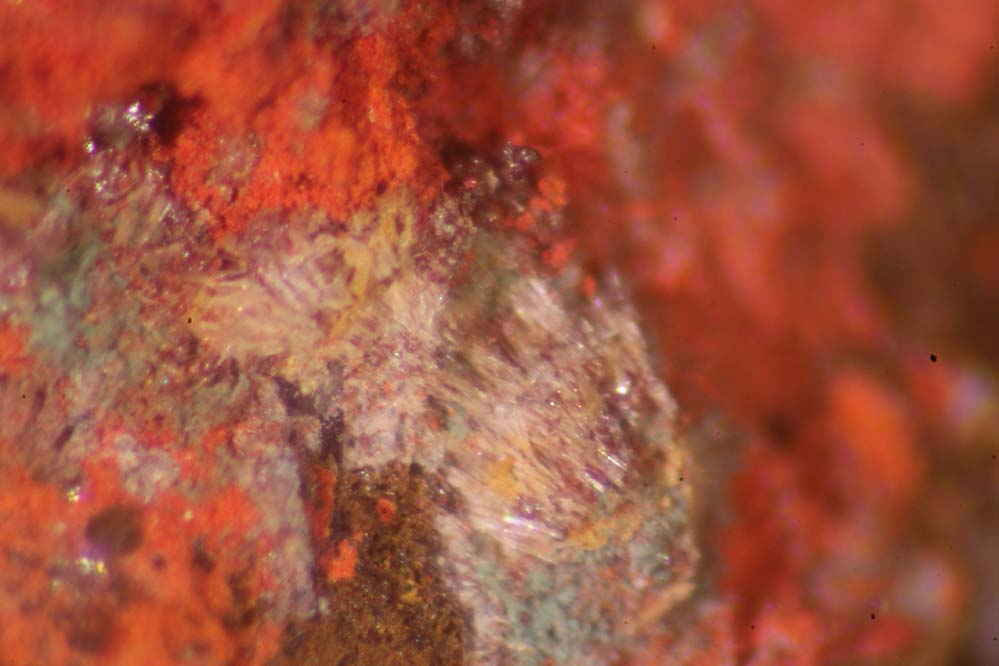
- Kenhsuite and cinabrio.Oriental mine, Chóvar (Castellón)Spain.

General
- Category: Silphohalide mineral
- Formula: Hg_{3}S_{2}Cl_{2}
- IMA symbol: Khs
- Crystal system: Orthorhombic

Identification
- Color: White or pale orange-pink to salmon-pink; darkening on exposure to light.
- Crystal habit: Acicular crystals
- Mohs scale hardness: 2-3
- Diaphaneity: Transparent

Kenhsuite is a mercury sulfide with chloride ions. It was described as a species from specimens obtained at the McDermitt mine, in Opalite, Humboldt Nevada county, (USA). The name is a tribute to Dr. Kenneth Junghwa Hsu. Professor Emeritus of the Swiss Federal Institute of Technology, Zurich (Switzerland).

== Physical and chemical properties ==
Kenhsuite appears as aggregates of capillary or needle microcrystals, with a glassy or silky sheen. The mineral is originally colorless or white in color, but is most often tinged with orange or red due to the presence of associated cinnabar. Prolonged exposure to light causes their darkening. The mercury sulfide chloride with the composition of kenhsuite is known in three polymorphic forms. Kenhsuita is rhombic, while the other two are corderoite and lavrientivite.

== Deposits ==
Kenhsuite is an extremely rare mineral, known in very few localities in the world. In the type locality, it was found as extremely small acicular or tabular crystals, less than 100 microns in size. The locality where the best specimens appear is the Oriental mine, in Chóvar, Castellón (Spain), where the acicular crystals usually exceed one millimeter, forming centimetric aggregates of fan-shaped crystals. In these two deposits it appears associated with corderoite and cinnabar.
