= Kolbeckite =

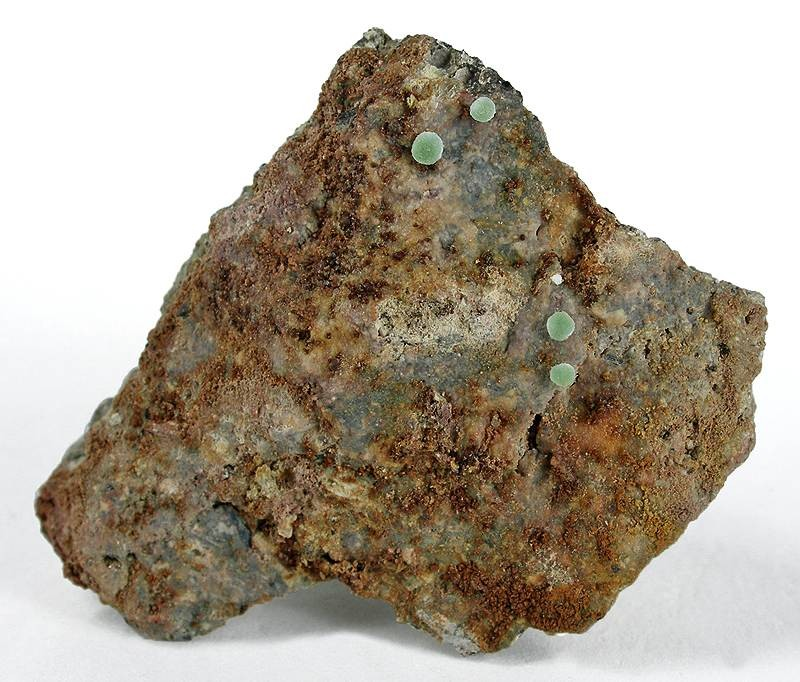
- Light-green spherical aggregates of microcrystals of Kolbeckite, to just over 1mm in size. Locality: Schlarbaum quarry, Klause, Bad Gleichenberg, Styria, Austria. Size: 4.9 x 3.9 x 2.3 cm.

General
- Category: Phosphate minerals
- Formula: ScPO_{4}·2H_{2}O
- IMA symbol: Kbe
- Strunz classification: 8.CD.05
- Crystal system: Monoclinic
- Crystal class: Prismatic (2/m) (same H-M symbol)
- Space group: P2_{1}/n

Kolbeckite (scandium phosphate dihydrate) is a mineral with formula: ScPO_{4}·2H_{2}O. It was discovered originally at Schmiedeberg, Saxony, Germany in 1926 and is named after Friedrich L. W. Kolbeck, a German mineralogist. Kolbeckite is usually found as small clusters of crystals associated with other phosphate minerals.

== See also ==
- List of minerals
- List of minerals named after people
