= Katsarosite =

Oxalate mineral

Κatsarosite
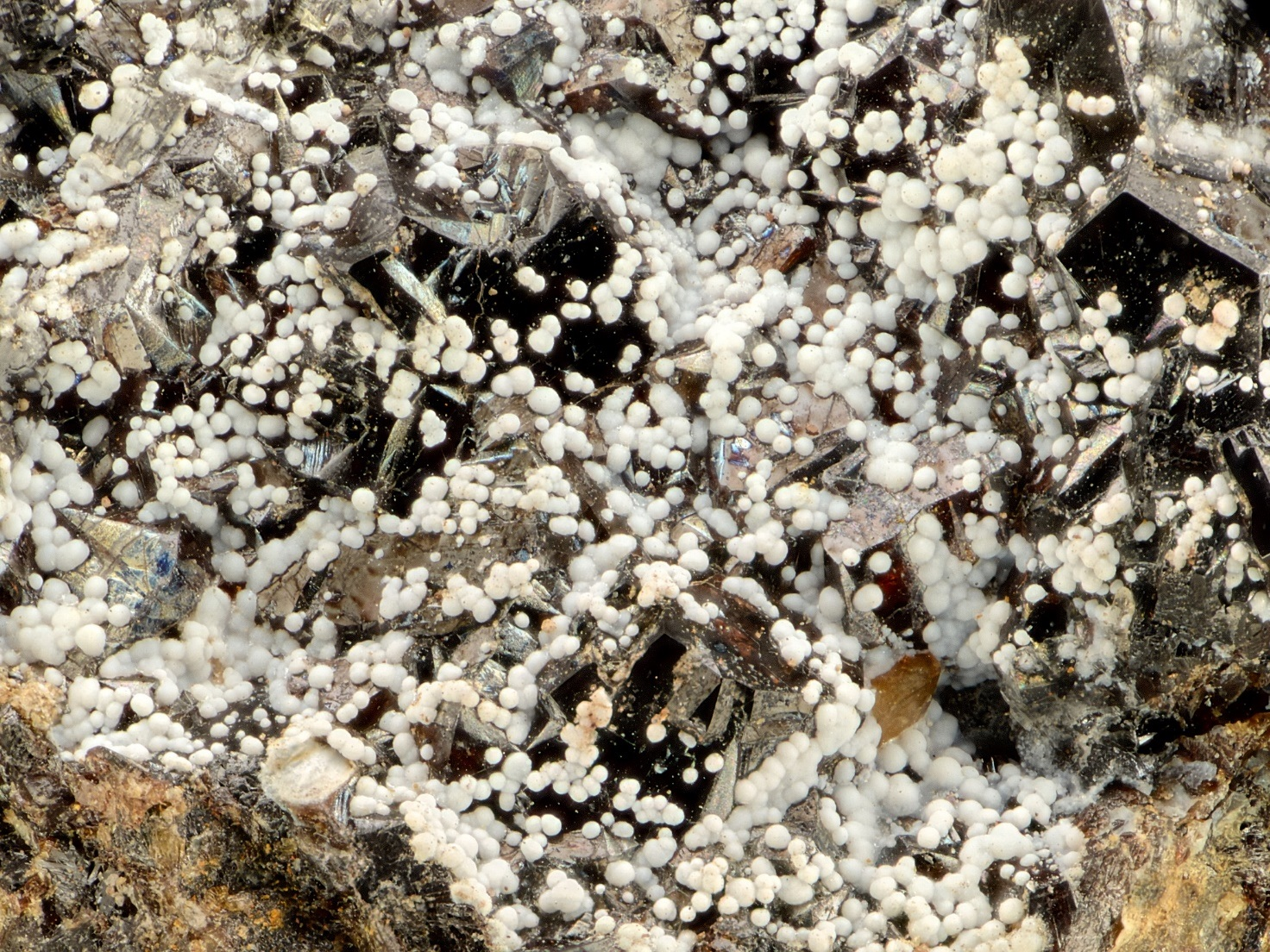
- Esperanza Mine, Kaminiza mines, Km 3, Lavrion Mining District, Lavreotiki, East Attica, Attica, Greece

General
- Category: Minerals
- Formula: Zn(C_{2}O_{4})·2H_{2}O
- Strunz classification: 10.AB.05 10 : ORGANIC COMPOUNDS A : Salts of organic acids B : Oxalates
- Crystal system: Monoclinic
- Space group: 2/m - Prismatic
- Unit cell: a = 11.768(3) Å, b = 5.388(1) Å, c = 9.804(2) Å β = 127.045(8)°

Identification
- Color: White to Yellow
- Cleavage: Perfect on {110}, imperfect on {100} and {010}
- Streak: Pale yellow
- Diaphaneity: Transparent to opaque

Katsarosite is a rarely occurring mineral from the mineral class of organic compounds with the chemical composition Zn(C_{2}O_{4})·2H_{2}O and is therefore a water-containing zinc(II) oxalate or the zinc salt of oxalic acid.

Katsarosite is categorized in the humboldtine group as the Zn analogue of humboldtine (Fe(C_{2}O_{4})·2H_{2}O). It is the second Zn-bearing oxalate mineral after alterite.

Katsarosite crystallizes in the monoclinic crystal system and appears as crystals that are mostly fine granular to earthy, usually rounded with an average diameter of 30 μm. The color depends on the iron (Fe^{2+}) content, ranging from pure white to yellow in Fe-rich specimens.
