= Kosnarite =

Alkali zirconium phosphate mineral

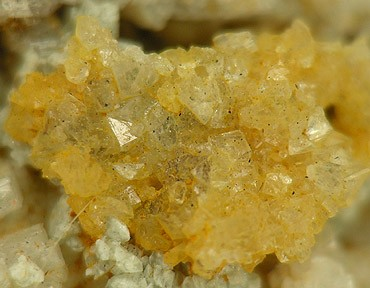

General
- Category: Alkali zirconium phosphate
- Formula: KZr_{2}(PO_{4})_{3}
- IMA symbol: Ksn
- Strunz classification: 7/A. 17-10
- Crystal system: Trigonal Hexagonal crystal family
- Crystal class: Hexagonal Scalenohedral (3̅)m (3̅)2/m) (same H-M symbol)
- Space group: R3̅c
- Unit cell: a = 8.687 Å, c = 23.877 Å; V= 1,560.45 Å³

Identification
- Color: Pale Blue, blue-green, or colorless
- Crystal habit: Rhombohedral with tiny c pinacolid
- Twinning: Not observed
- Cleavage: Perfect at {102}
- Fracture: Conchoidal fracture
- Mohs scale hardness: 4.5
- Luster: Vitreous
- Streak: White
- Diaphaneity: Transparent to translucent
- Specific gravity: 3.2
- Optical properties: uniaxial (+)
- Refractive index: N_{w} = 1.656(2); N_{c} = 1.682(2)
- Birefringence: δ = 0.026

Kosnarite is an alkali zirconium phosphate mineral (KZr_{2}(PO_{4})_{3}) named after an expert of pegmatites Richard Andrew "Rich" Kosnar, well-known mineral dealer and collector from Colorado (November 13, 1946 - January 15, 2007). Kosnarite contains potassium, oxygen, phosphorus, and zirconium with sodium, rubidium, hafnium, manganese and fluorine (Na, Rb, Hf, Mn, and F) being common impurities found in kosnarite. It was discovered in nature for the first time in 1991 by Vandall T. King. Samples that were found in granitic pegmatites from the Mount Mica Quarry, Paris, Oxford County, Maine, US were sent to Eugene E. Foord for study. This became the first recorded case of naturally occurring kosnarite.

== Occurrence ==
The first naturally occurring kosnarite was discovered in northern Maine in the United States. Another deposit was later found in Black Mountain, Oxford County, Maine. Both of these deposits were found in zoned granitic pegmatites associated with several minerals such as quartz, lepidolite, and beryl. Another deposit was found in Wycheproof, Northern Victoria, Australia, and this sample of kosnarite was also found in granitic pegmatite. Pegmatite is the term for a form of igneous rock with relatively large interlocking crystals, and there are three popular theories on how pegmatites named metamorphic, magmatic, and metasomatic. The pegmatites that the kosnarite are found in are believed to be formed by a mixture of magmatic and metamorphic as the kosnarite forms in the later stages of paragenesis by the alterations of hydrothermal fluids.

== Analysis ==
Due to the rarity of kosnarite, forms of analysis that involve the powdering of the sample such as X-ray diffraction (XRD) can not be used, so other methods have to be used. To find the data that would have been provided by the XRD, a Gandolfi camera with an 114.6mm diameter was used to find the d-spacing and intensity. Kosnarite's density was found using the sink-float method while using an acetone mixture and methylene iodide. In order to find the chemical composition of kosnarite without damaging any sample, an ARL-SEMQ electron microprobe using an Opus microprobe automation system was used. To help find the chemical composition, CITZAF correction procedures were added to the study. Additionally, emission spectrographic analysis was completed by using a Jarrel-Ash 3.2-m spectrograph using a laser energy source.

== Chemical composition ==
Oxides	wt%
P_{2}O_{5}	43.3%
ZrO_{2}	44.5%
HfO_{2}	0.5%
MnO	1.0%
FeO	0.2%
K_{2}O	8.7%
Na_{2}O	1.4%
Rb_{2}O	0.25%
F-	0.20%
Total	100.05%

== Properties ==
The results of the testing found that kosnarite had large amounts of zirconium, phosphorus, and potassium. In the samples, there were also traces of calcium, zinc, and manganese, but these elements make up less than one percent, so they were classified as impurities. Physically, kosnarite from the pegmatites found in Maine occurred as rhombohedral crystals with a hexagonal unit cell and were pseudocubic with a maximum size of around 0.9 mm. This is important as zirconium is in the form of a six coordinated octahedron and potassium is structured in a shape called a trigonal antiprism that is also six coordinated. Kosnarite's structure was then determined by using [100] Patterson projection, and interatomic vector projection was also used to help determine the crystal structure. Special positions in the mineral were then found for potassium, zirconium, and phosphate while the two oxygen atoms had general positions. Multiple refinement cycles using a unit weighing system, and least-squares refinements were used to minimize the deviation of the shifting of the atoms. Later tests showed that zirconium polyhedra groups were joined by groups of phosphate these are both connected to each other by oxygen atoms. However, the oxygens are always bridges between the zirconium and phosphate and one oxygen is never shared between two the same groups and half of the oxygens are also shared with K groups. The pattern of two zirconium polyhedron, one potassium polyhedron, two zirconium polyhedron, and the oxygen and phosphate groups filling in the gaps creates kosnarite's unique crystal structure.

Depending on the impurities present in the sample, the color of kosnarite can range from pale blue to blue-green depending on the amount of iron, manganese, or other impurities, and kosnarite can sometimes appear to be nearly colorless. Other physical properties of kosnarite include its vitreous lust, non-fluorescence, a hardness of 4.5 on the mohs scale of mineral hardness, conchoidal fracturing, and perfect cleavage in the {102} direction. Structurally, kosnarite is part of the hexagonal crystal family meaning that the crystals have three or six-fold symmetry and has a space group of R3̅c. The unit cell of kosnarite was calculated to be a = 8.687 Å, c = 23.877 Å; V = 1,560.45 Å^{3}, and no twinning growth has been observed. It was discovered that kosnarite is uniaxial (+) with its axes being N_{w} = 1.656(2), N_{c} = 1.682(2), and being nonpleochronic. Due to the small number of available samples, some tests have not been carried out, such as infrared spectra.

== Related minerals ==
Kosnarite is part of the alkali zirconium phosphates in which there are only two other known members of this group: gainesite, and a Cs analogue of gainesite.

== See also ==
- Crystal systems
- List of minerals
