= Kuratite =

General
- Category: Inosilicates
- Formula: Ca_{2}(Fe^{2+}_{5}Ti)O_{2}[Si_{4}Al_{2}O_{18}]
- IMA symbol: Kur
- Crystal system: Triclinic
- Crystal class: Pinacoidal (1̅) (same H-M symbol)
- Space group: P1̅
- Unit cell: a = 10.513(7) b = 10.887(7) c = 9.004(18) [Å] α = 105.97(13)° β = 96.00(12)° γ = 124.82(4)°; Z = 1

Identification

Kuratite, named for Dr. Gero Kurat (1938–2009), meteorite researcher and Curator of the Meteorite Collection at the Vienna Natural History Museum, was first recognized as a new mineral by the Commission on New Minerals, Nomenclature and Classification in 2014 from a small meteorite sample.
