= Kleinite =

Dimercury imide mineral

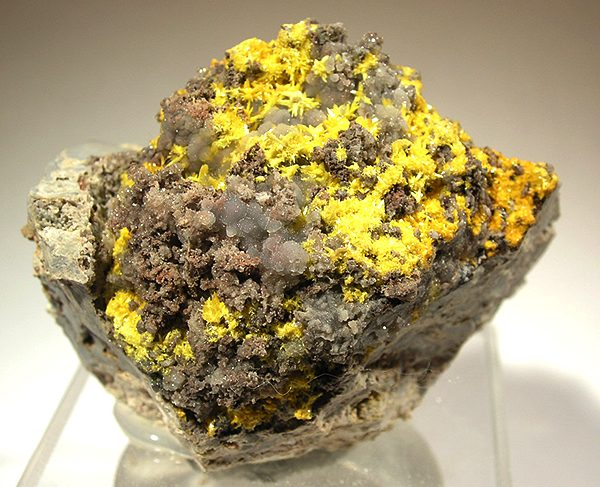
- Kleinite atop quartz from the McDermitt Mine

General
- Category: Minerals
- Formula: (Hg_{2}N)(Cl,SO_{4}) · nH_{2}O
- Strunz classification: 3.DD.35
- Crystal system: Hexagonal
- Crystal class: Dihexagonal dipyramidal 6/mmm (6/m 2/m 2/m)
- Unit cell: a = 6.762(2) Å, c = 11.068(3) Å, Z=4

Identification
- Color: Light to canary-yellow, orange
- Crystal habit: Short prismatic to equant crystals exhibiting prominent {101̅0}, {202̅1}, and {0001}
- Cleavage: Uneven on {0001}, imperfect on {101̅0}
- Tenacity: Brittle
- Mohs scale hardness: 3.5
- Luster: Adamantine to greasy
- Streak: Sulfur yellow
- Diaphaneity: Transparent to translucent
- Specific gravity: 7.9-8.0
- Optical properties: Uniaxial (+) (Biaxial below 130 °C (biaxial negative) and uniaxial above 130 °C (uniaxial positive). Isotropic above ~ 190 °C)
- Refractive index: n_{ω} = 2.190 n_{ε} = 2.210
- Birefringence: δ = 0.020
- Other characteristics: Color deepens on exposure to daylight, original color returns in darkness

Kleinite is a rare mineral that has only been found in the United States and Germany that occurs in hydrothermal mercury deposits. It occurs associated with calcite, gypsum and (rarely) barite or calomel. Its color can range from pale yellow/canary yellow to orange, and it is transparent to translucent. As a photosensitive mineral, its coloration darkens when exposed to light.

It has been hypothesized that kleinite formed through a "reaction of cinnabar with oxidized meteoric water", with this reaction being the source of kleinite's nitrogen.

== Etymology ==
Kleinite is named after Carl Klein (1842–1907), who was a professor of mineralogy at the University of Berlin.

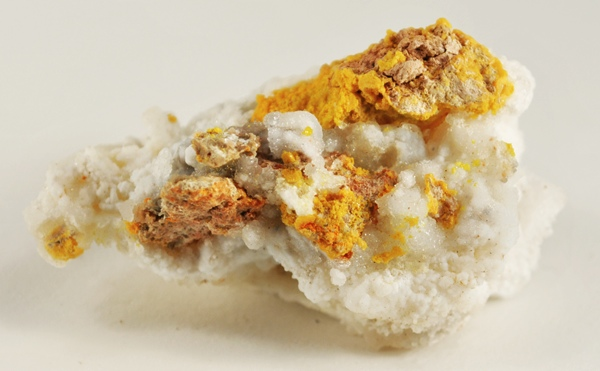
Kleinite on calcite, from McDermitt Mine (Cordero Mine; Old Cordero Mine), Opalite District, Humboldt County, Nevada, United States

== See also ==
- Halide minerals
- List of minerals
