= Strengite =

Iron phosphate mineral

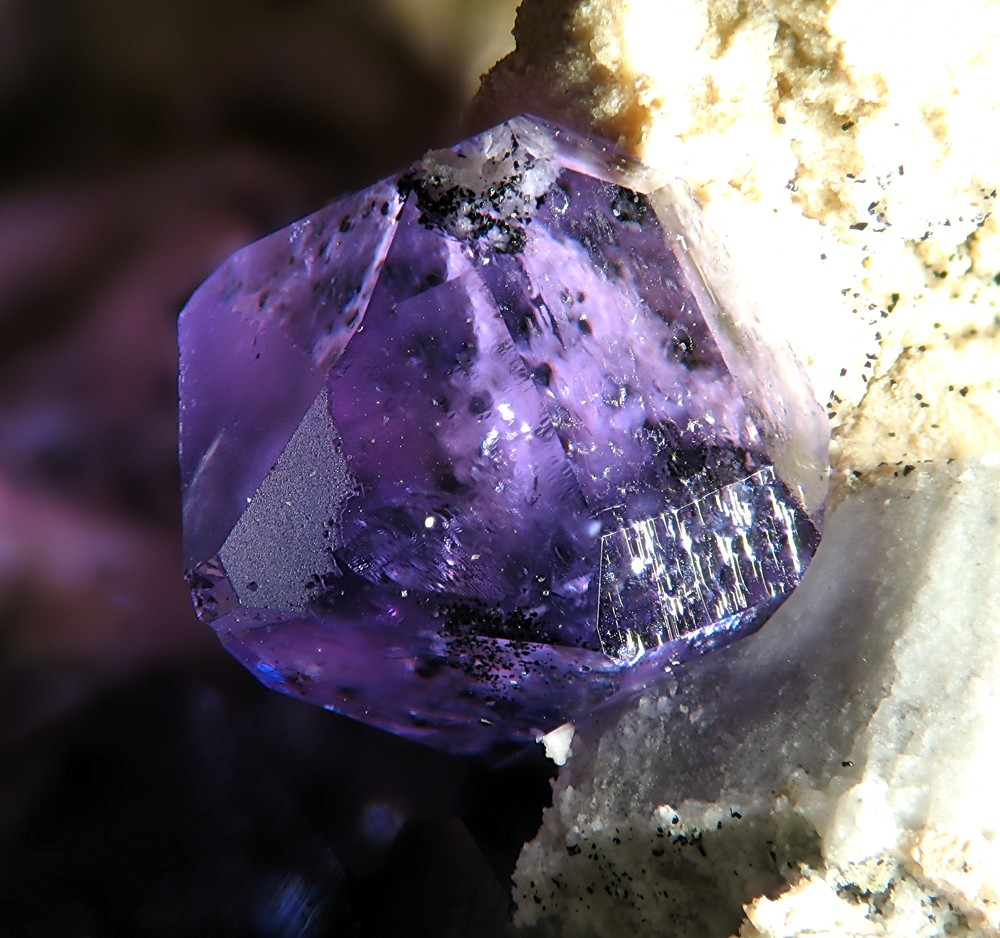
- A small crystal of Strengite

General
- Category: Minerals
- Formula: FePO_{4}·2H_{2}O
- IMA symbol: Stg
- Strunz classification: 8.CD.10
- Dana classification: 40.04.01.02
- Crystal system: Orthorhombic
- Crystal class: Dipyramidal (mmm); H-M Symbol: (2/m 2/m 2/m)
- Space group: Pcab

Identification
- Formula mass: 186.85 g/mol
- Color: Colorless, pale violet, deep violet, red, carmine red, greenish white
- Crystal habit: Botryoidal, radial, spherical
- Cleavage: {010} Good, {001} Poor
- Mohs scale hardness: 3.5–4
- Luster: Vitreous
- Streak: White
- Diaphaneity: Transparent to translucent
- Specific gravity: 2.84
- Density: 2.87 g/cm^{3}
- Optical properties: Biaxial (+)
- 2V angle: 72° – 88°
- Dispersion: r < v, relatively strong

Strengite is a relatively rare iron phosphate mineral with the formula: FePO_{4}·2H_{2}O. The mineral is named after the German mineralogist Johann August Streng (1830–1897). Lavender, pink or purple in hue, it is similar to variscite and is partially soluble, particularly in conditions where there is a low pH and low oxidation-reduction potential. The color comes from ferric ion (Fe^{3+}).
