= Kutnohorite =

Mineral of calcium manganese carbonate

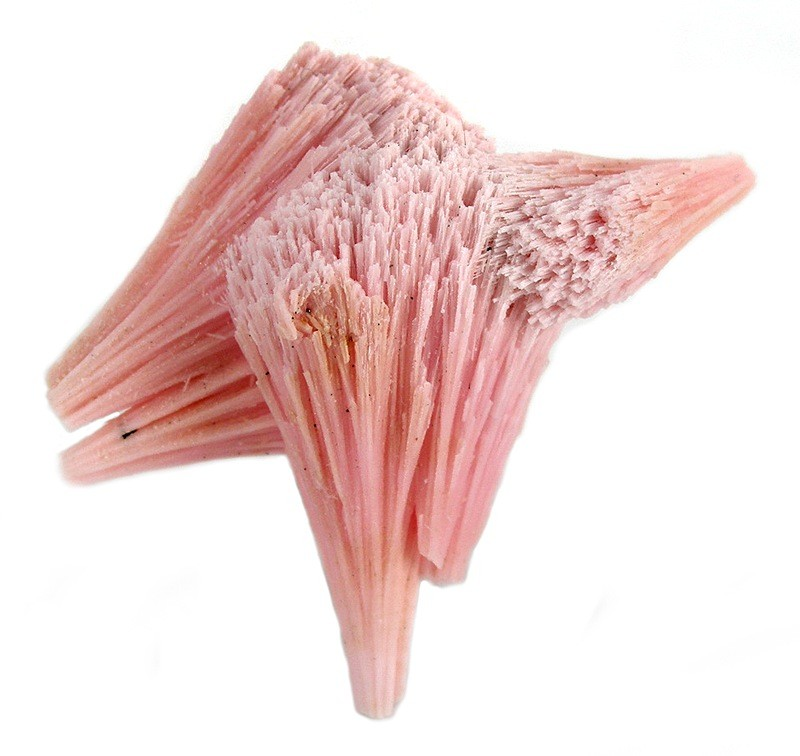
- Kutnohorite, Wessels Mine, Kalahari manganese fields, Northern Cape Province, South Africa. Size 4.4 x 4.2 x 1.9 cm

General
- Category: Carbonate mineral
- Formula: CaMn^{2+}(CO_{3})_{2}
- IMA symbol: Kut
- Strunz classification: 5.AB.10
- Dana classification: 14.2.1.3
- Crystal system: Trigonal
- Crystal class: Rhombohedral (3̅); H-M symbol: (3̅)
- Space group: R3̅
- Unit cell: 330.60 Å³

Identification
- Formula mass: 215.0 g/mol (end member)
- Color: White, pale pink or light brown
- Crystal habit: Aggregates of bundled bladed crystals
- Cleavage: Perfect on {101̅1}
- Fracture: Subconchoidal
- Tenacity: Brittle
- Mohs scale hardness: 3.5–4
- Luster: Vitreous to dull
- Streak: White to pale pink
- Diaphaneity: Translucent
- Specific gravity: 3.12
- Density: 3.10–3.12
- Optical properties: Uniaxial (−)
- Refractive index: n_{o} = 1.710–1.727, n_{e} = 1.519–1.535
- Birefringence: 0.191–0.192
- Solubility: Soluble in acids

Kutnohorite is a rare calcium manganese carbonate mineral with the formula CaMn^{2+}(CO_{3})_{2} in the dolomite group of minerals. It forms a solid solution with the other group members dolomite and ankerite. The mineral was originally spelt "kutnahorite", but "kutnohorite" is the current IMA-approved spelling.

== Occurrence ==
Kutnohorite was first described in 1901 by Antonín Bukovský from material found in Poličany, Kutná Hora, Central Bohemia Region, Bohemia, Czech Republic, then in Austria-Hungary. It was named after the Czech name of the location. Type material is conserved at Harvard University, Cambridge, Massachusetts, US.

Kutnohorite occurs typically in manganiferous sediments, associated with rhodochrosite, aragonite and calcite. Notable occurrences include Tuscany, Italy and Kutná Hora, Czech Republic. It probably occurs at the Trepča Mines, Stari Trg, Kosovo, in the Balkans. At the Eldorado Mine, Ouray County, Colorado, US, it occurs as tiny white crystals partially encrusting quartz and dolomite. At the Ryujima Mine in Nagano Prefecture, Japan, magnesian kutnohorite occurs with quartz and rhodochrosite.

== Composition ==
Specimens of Kutnohorite typically differ from the ideal formula CaMn^{2+}(CO_{3})_{2}, the manganese content varying from 38% to 84%. Manganese is commonly substituted by Mg^{2+} and Fe^{2+}, so the formula Ca(Mn^{2+},Mg,Fe^{2+})(CO_{3})_{2} better represents the species.

=== Unit cell ===
There are three formula units per unit cell (Z = 3), and the lengths of the sides are close to 4.9 Å and c between 16 Å and 17 Å, although different sources give slightly different values, as follows:

a = 4.915 Å	c = 16.639 Å
a = 4.8518(3) Å	c = 16.217(2) Å
a = 4.85 Å	c = 16.34 Å

=== Structure ===
The crystal class is trigonal 3̅, space group R3̅, the same as for the other members of the dolomite group. There are layers of (CO_{3})^{2−} groups perpendicular to the long crystal axis c, and between these layers there are layers of the cations Ca^{2+} and Mn^{2+}. If there were perfect ordering amongst the cations they would separate into different layers, giving rise to the ordered sequence: Ca−(CO_{3})−Mn−(CO_{3})−Ca−(CO_{3})−Mn−(CO_{3})− along the c axis; not all specimens, however, display such ordering.

== Properties ==
=== Optical properties ===
Kutnohorite may be white, pale pink or light brown. The pink shades are due to increased manganese and the brown colours are due to increased iron content. The mineral is translucent with a white to pale pink streak and vitreous to dull luster. It is uniaxial (−) with refractive indices N_{o} = 1.710 to 1.727 and N_{e} = 1.519 to 1.535, similar to dolomite. The ordinary refractive index, N_{o}, is high, comparable with spinel (1.719).

=== Physical properties ===
Kutnohorite occurs as aggregates of bundled blades of white, rose-pink, or light-brown crystals. Also as simple rhombs with curved faces, polycrystalline spherules and in massive and granular habits. It has perfect rhombohedral cleavage, typical of carbonates. It is brittle with a subconchoidal fracture and it is quite soft, with hardness 3.5 to 4, between calcite and fluorite. Specific gravity is 3.12, denser than both dolomite and calcite. It is soluble in acids, as are all carbonates.

== Dolomite group ==
• Dolomite:	CaMg(CO_{3})_{2}
• Ankerite:	CaFe^{2+}(CO_{3})_{2}
• Kutnohorite:	CaMn^{2+}(CO_{3})_{2}
• Minrecordite:	CaZn(CO_{3})_{2}
