= List of minerals recognized by the International Mineralogical Association (D) =

This list includes those recognised minerals beginning with the letter D. The International Mineralogical Association is the international group that recognises new minerals and new mineral names; however, minerals discovered before 1959 did not go through the official naming procedure, although some minerals published previously have been either confirmed or discredited since that date. This list contains a mixture of mineral names that have been approved since 1959 and those mineral names believed to still refer to valid mineral species (these are called "grandfathered" species).

The list is divided into groups:

- Introduction • (Main synonyms)
- A • B • C • D • E • F • G • H • I • J • K • L • M • N • O • P–Q • R • S • T • U–V • W–X • Y–Z

The data was exported from mindat.org on 29 April 2005; updated up to 'IMA2021'.

The minerals are sorted by name, followed by the structural group (rruff.info/ima and ima-cnmnc by mineralienatlas.de, mainly) or chemical class (mindat.org and basics), the year of publication (if it's before of an IMA approval procedure), the IMA approval and the Strunz-mindat code. The first link is to mindat.org, the second link is to webmineral.com, and the third is to the Handbook of Mineralogy (Mineralogical Society of America).

- Abbreviations:
  - ^{D} – discredited (IMA/CNMNC status).
  - ^{Q} – questionable/ doubtful (IMA/CNMNC, mindat.org or mineralienatlas.de status).
  - ^{N} – published without approval of the IMA/CNMNC, or just not an IMA approved mineral but with some acceptance in the scientific community nowadays.
  - ^{I} – intermediate member of a solid-solution series.
  - ^{H} – hypothetical mineral (synthetic, anthropogenic, suspended approval procedure, etc.)
    - ^{ch} – incomplete description, hypothetical solid solution end member.
  - Rd – redefinition of ...
  - "s.p." – special procedure.
  - group – a name used to designate a group of species, sometimes only a mineral group name.
  - no – no link available.
  - IUPAC – chemical name.
  - Y: NNNN – year of publication.
  - Y: old – known before publications were available.

== D ==
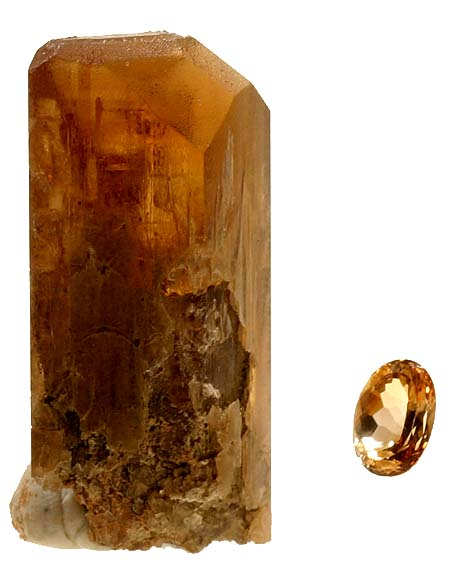
Danburite, 5.6 × 2.8 × 1.9 cm cut gem, 5.48 carats, 1.3 × 1 cm Bor Pit, Dal'negorsk B deposit, Primorsky Krai, Far Eastern economic region, Russia

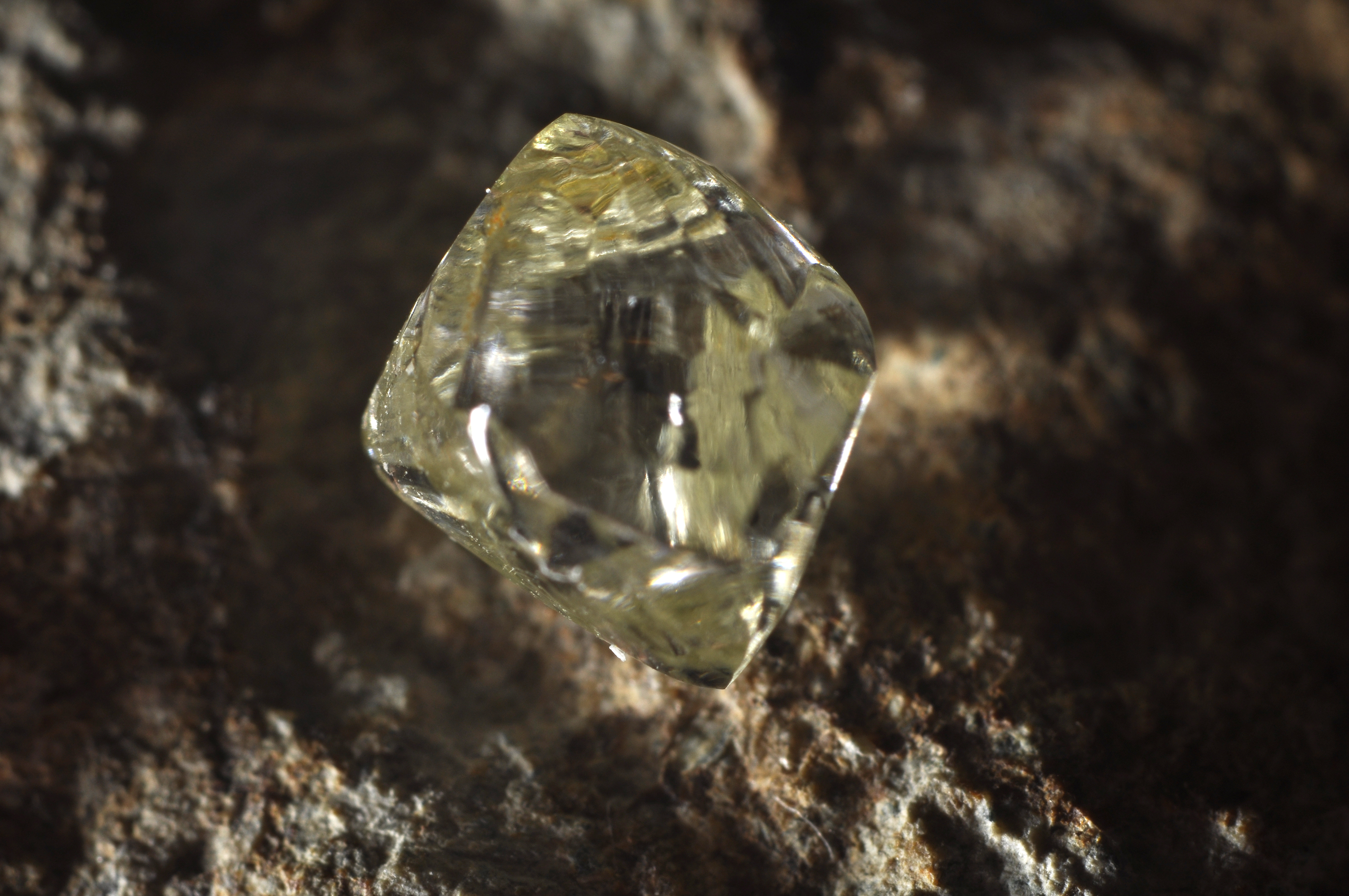
Greenish diamond, Venezuela

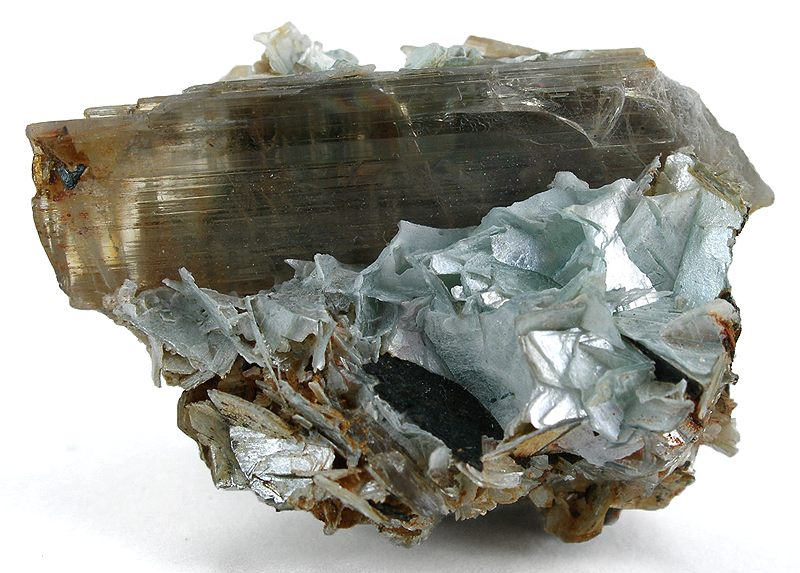
Diaspore doubly-terminated crystal perched in matrix of crystallized margarite, Mugla Province, Aegean Region, Turkey

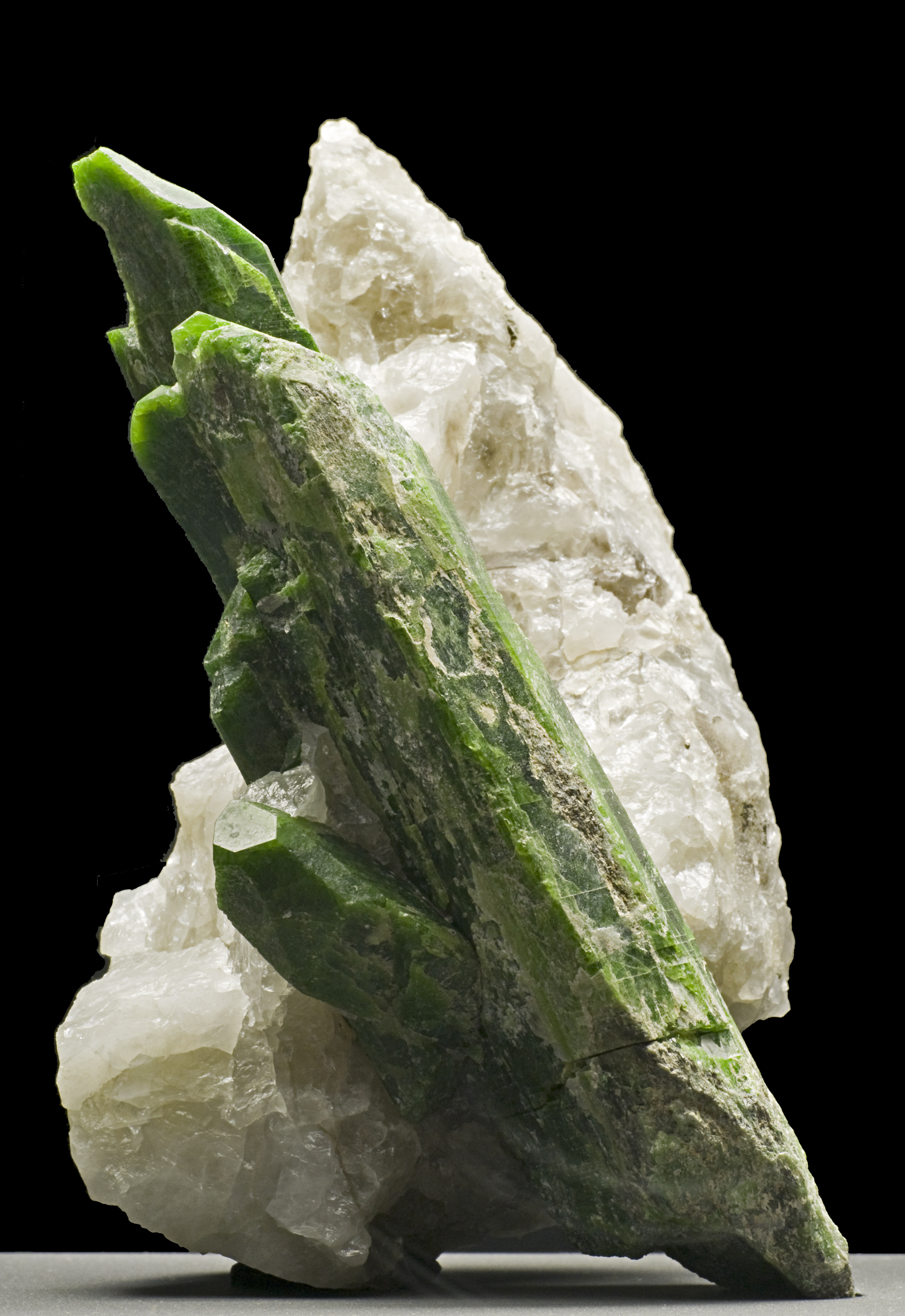
Diopside

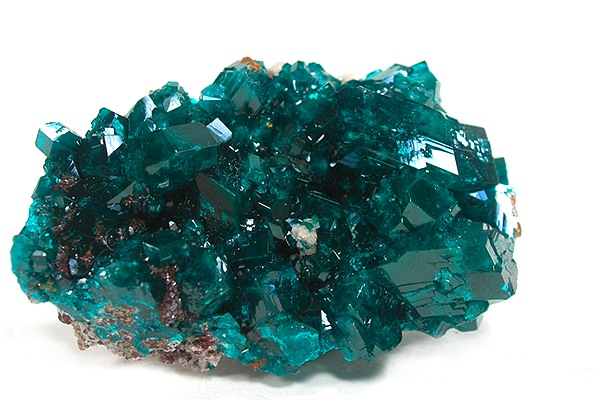
Dioptase, 5.2 × 3.4 × 1.4 cm, Tsumeb, Namibia

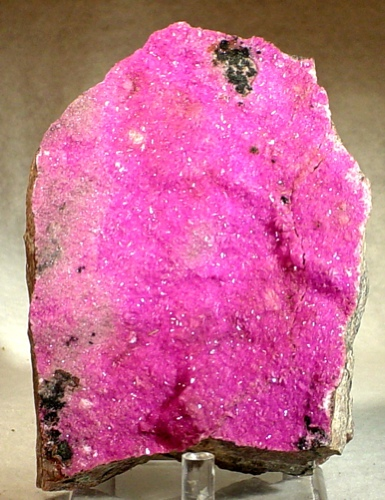
Cobaltoan dolomite, 11 × 8 × 4.3 cm, Kolwezi Mine, Lualaba District, Democratic Republic of the Congo

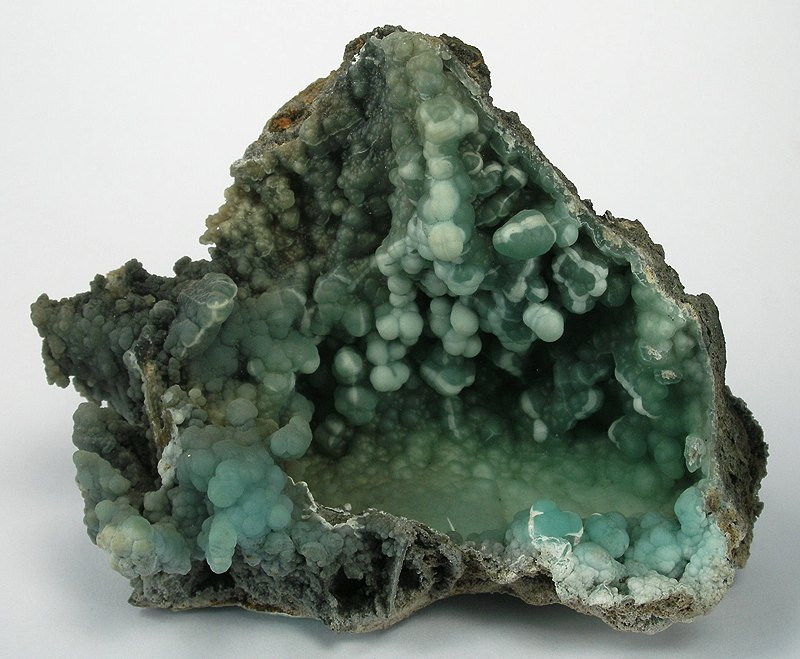
Doyleite from Xianghualing Mine, Xianghualing Sn-polymetallic ore field, Linwu County, Chenzhou Prefecture, Hunan Province, China

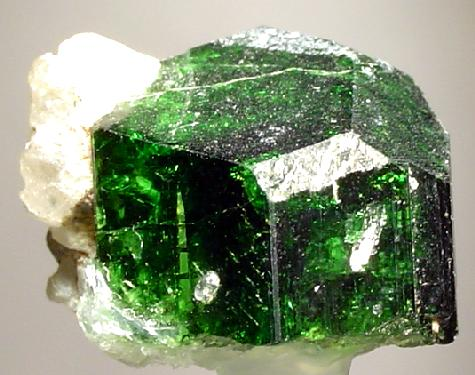
Chrome dravite tourmaline, 1.4 × 0.9 × 0.9 cm, Merelani Hills, Arusha Region, Tanzania

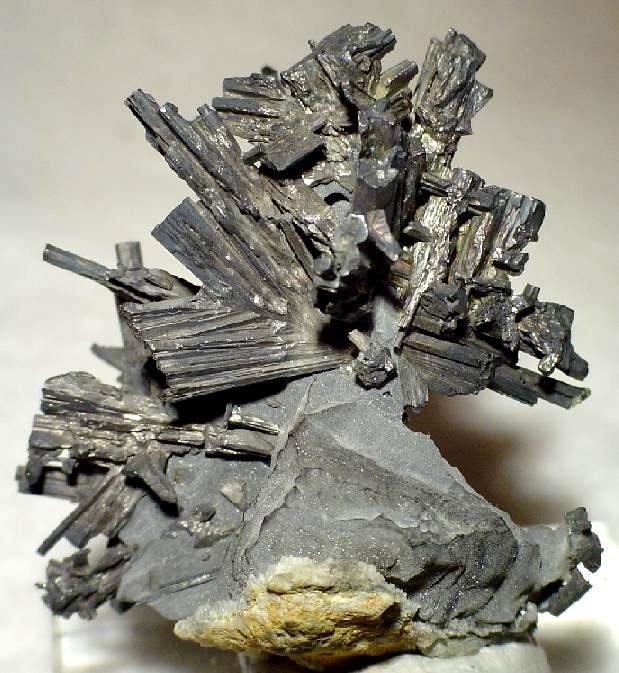
Dyscrasite, 4.5 × 4.5 × 3.3 cm, Uranium Mine No. 21, Příbram, Central Bohemian Region, Czech Republic

1. Dachiardite (zeolitic tectosilicate) 9.GD.40
  1. Dachiardite-Ca ( IMA1997 s.p., 1906) 9.GD.40
  2. Dachiardite-K (IMA2015-041) 9.GD.40 [no] [no]
  3. Dachiardite-Na (IMA1997 s.p., 1975) 9.GD.40 [no]
2. Dadsonite (dadsonite: IMA1968-011) 2.HC.30
  (Pb_{23}Sb_{25}S_{60}Cl)
3. Dagenaisite (tellurium oxysalt: IMA2017-017) 7.A?. [no] [no]
  (IUPAC: trizinc tellurium(VI) hexaoxide)
4. Daliranite (IMA2007-010) 2.JB.70 [no]
  (IUPAC: lead mercury diarsenide hexasulfide)
5. Dalnegorskite (wollastonite: IMA2018-007) 9.D?. [no] [no]
  (IUPAC: pentacalcium manganese di(nonaoxotrisilicate))
6. Dalnegroite (chabournéite: IMA2009-058) 2.HC.05e [no]
  (Tl_{4}Pb_{2}(As,Sb)_{20}S_{34})
7. Dalyite (Y: 1952) 9.EA.25
  (K_{2}ZrSi_{6}O_{15})
8. Damaraite (IMA1989-013) 3.DC.75
  (IUPAC: trilead hydrodioxo chloride)
9. Damiaoite (alloy: IMA1995-041) 1.AG.55
  (IUPAC: platinum diindium alloy)
10. Danalite (sodalite: 1866) 9.FB.10
  (IUPAC: triberyllium tetrairon(II) tri(tetraoxysilicate) sulfide)
11. Danbaite (alloy: IMA1981-041) 1.AB.10b
  (IUPAC: copper dizinc alloy)
12. Danburite (danburite: 1839) 9.FA.65
  (IUPAC: calcium octaoxy diboro disilicate)
13. Danielsite (IMA1984-044) 2.BD.15
  ((Cu,Ag)_{14}HgS_{8})
14. D'ansite (d'ansite) 7.BC.05
  1. D'ansite (IMA2007 s.p., 1958) 7.BC.05
    (IUPAC: henicosasodium magnesium trichloro decasulfate)
  2. D'ansite-(Fe) (IMA2011-065) 7.BC. [no]
    (IUPAC: henicosasodium iron(II) trichloro decasulfate)
  3. D'ansite-(Mn) (IMA2011-064) 7.BC. [no]
    (IUPAC: henicosasodium manganese(II) trichloro decasulfate)
15. Dantopaite (pavonite: IMA2008-058) 2.JA.05 [no]
  (Ag_{5}Bi_{13}S_{22})
16. Daomanite (Y: 1974) 2.LA.15
  (IUPAC: copper platinum sulfarsenite)
17. Daqingshanite-(Ce) (IMA1981-063) 5.BF.15
  (IUPAC: tristrontium cerium phosphate tricarbonate)
18. Darapiosite (milarite: IMA1974-056) 9.CM.05
19. Darapskite (IMA1967 s.p., 1891) 7.DG.05
  (IUPAC: trisodium sulfate nitrate monohydrate)
20. Dargaite (nabimusaite, arctite: IMA2015-068) 9.0 [no] [no]
21. Darrellhenryite (tourmaline: IMA2012-026) 9.CK. [no] [no]
22. Dashkovaite (IMA2000-006) 10.AA.10
  (IUPAC: magnesium formiate dihydrate)
23. Datolite (gadolinite: 1806) 9.AJ.20
  (IUPAC: calcium boro tetraoxysilicate hydroxyl)
24. Daubréeite (matlockite: 1876) 3.DC.25
  (IUPAC: hydrobismuth oxide)
25. Daubréelite (spinel, linnaeite: 1876) 2.DA.05
  (IUPAC: iron(II) dichromium tetrasulfide)
26. Davanite (IMA1982-100) 9.EA.25
  (K_{2}TiSi_{6}O_{15})
27. Davemaoite (perovskite: IMA2020-012a) 4.0 [no] [no]
  (IUPAC: calcium trioxysilicate)
28. Davidbrownite-(NH4) (oxalate: IMA2018-129) 10.0 [no] [no]
29. Davidite (crichtonite) 4.CC.40
  1. Davidite-(Ce) (IMA1966 s.p., 1960) 4.CC.40
  2. Davidite-(La) (IMA1987 s.p., 1906) 4.CC.40
  3. Davidite-(Y)^{H} (1966) 4.CC.40 [no] [no]
30. Davidlloydite (parahopeite: IMA2011-053) 8.CA. [no] [no]
  (IUPAC: trizinc diarsenate tetrahydrate)
31. Davidsmithite (feldspathoid, nepheline: IMA2016-070) 9.F?. [no] [no]
32. Davinciite (eudialyte: IMA2011-019) 9.CO. [no]
33. Davisite (pyroxene: IMA2008-030) 9.DA.15 [no]
  (IUPAC: calcium scandium aluminium hexaoxy silicate)
34. Davreuxite (Y: 1878) 9.BF.15
35. Davyne (cancrinite: 1825) 9.FB.05
36. Dawsonite (Y: 1874) 5.BB.10
  (IUPAC: sodium aluminium dihydro carbonate)
37. Deanesmithite (IMA1991-001) 7.FB.20
  (Hg^{1+}_{2}Hg^{2+}_{3}S_{2}O(CrO_{4}))
38. Debattistiite (IMA2011-098) 2.0 [no] [no]
  (Ag_{9}Hg_{0.5}As_{6}S_{12}Te_{2})
39. Decagonite (alloy: IMA2015-017) 1.AH. [no] [no]
  (Al_{71}Ni_{24}Fe_{5})
40. Decrespignyite-(Y) (IMA2001-027) 5.CC.35
  (IUPAC: tetrayttrium copper chloro pentahydro tetracarbonate dihydrate)
41. Deerite (IMA1964-016) 9.DH.60
42. Defernite (IMA1978-057) 5.BA.25
43. Dekatriasartorite (sartorite: IMA2017-071) 2.0 [no] [no]
  (TlPb_{58}As_{97}S_{204})
44. Delafossite (Y: 1873) 4.AB.15
  (IUPAC: copper(I) iron(III) dioxide)
45. Delhayelite (rhodesite: IMA1962 s.p., 1959) 9.EB.10
46. Delhuyarite-(Ce) (chevkinite: IMA2016-091) 9.B?. [no] [no]
47. Deliensite (IMA1996-013) 7.EB.10
  (IUPAC: iron(II) diuranyl dihydro disulfate heptahydrate)
48. Delindeite (seidozerite, lamprophyllite: IMA1987-004) 9.BE.60
49. Dellagiustaite (spinel: IMA2017-101) 4.0 [no] [no]
  (IUPAC: vanadium(II) dialuminium tetraoxide)
50. Dellaite (IMA1964-005) 9.BG.45
  (IUPAC: hexacalcium heptaoxodisilicate tetraoxysilicate dihydroxyl)
51. Deloneite (apatite: IMA1995-036 Rd) 8.BN.05
52. Deloryite (IMA1990-037) 4.FL.85
  (IUPAC: tetracoper uranyl dimolybdenum hexahydro octaoxide)
53. Delrioite (delrioite: IMA1962 s.p., 1959 Rd) 4.HG.35
  (IUPAC: strontium divanadate(V) tetrahydrate)
54. Deltalumite (spinel: IMA2016-027) 4.0 [no] [no]
  ((Al_{0.67}☐_{0.33})Al_{2}O_{4})
55. Deltanitrogen (IMA2019-067b) 1.C0. [no] [no]
56. Delvauxite^{Q} (amorphous: 1836) 8.DM.35
  Note: an ill-defined hydrous ferric phosphate, related minerals: amorphous diadochite and triclinic destinezite.
57. Demagistrisite (IMA2018-059) 9.B?. [no] [no]
  (IUPAC: barium dicalcium tetramanganese(III) decaoxytrisilicate heptaoxodisilicate tetrahydroxyl trihydrate)
58. Demartinite (fluorosilicate: IMA2006-034) 3.CH.20 [no]
  (IUPAC: dipotassium hexafluorosilicate)
59. Demesmaekerite (IMA1965-019) 4.JJ.20
  (IUPAC: dilead pentacopper diuranyl hexahydro hexaselenate(IV) dihydrate)
60. Demicheleite 2.FC.25
  1. Demicheleite-(Br) (IMA2007-022) 2.FC.25 [no]
    (IUPAC: bismuth sulfide bromide)
  2. Demicheleite-(Cl) (IMA2008-020) 2.FC.25 [no]
    (IUPAC: bismuth sulfide chloride)
  3. Demicheleite-(I) (IMA2009-049) 2.FC. [no]
    (IUPAC: bismuth sulfide iodide)
61. Dendoraite-(NH4) (IMA2020-103) 8.DH. [no] [no]
62. Deynekoite (cerite: IMA2021-108) 8.AD. [no] [no]
63. Denisovite (IMA1982-031) 9.HA.85
  (KCa_{2}Si_{3}O_{8}F)
64. Denningite (IMA1967 s.p., 1963) 4.JK.30
65. Depmeierite (cancrinite: IMA2009-075) 9.FB.05 [no] [no]
66. Derbylite (Y: 1897) 4.JB.55
67. Derriksite (IMA1971-033) 4.JG.30
  (IUPAC: tetracopper uranyl hexahydro diselenate(IV))
68. Dervillite (IMA1983 s.p., 1941 Rd) 2.LA.10
  (IUPAC: disilver sulfarsenite)
69. Desautelsite (hydrotalcite: IMA1978-016) 5.DA.50
70. Descloizite (descloizite: 1854) 8.BH.40
  (IUPAC: lead zinc hydro vanadate)
71. Despujolsite (fleischerite: IMA1967-039) 7.DF.25
72. Dessauite-(Y) (crichtonite: IMA1994-057) 4.CC.40
73. Destinezite (sanjuanite-destinezite: IMA2000-E, 1881 Rd) 8.DB.05 [no] [no]
  Note: the triclinic counterpart of the amorphous diadochite.
74. Deveroite-(Ce) (oxalate: IMA2013-003) 10.0 [no]
  (IUPAC: dicerium trioxalate decahydrate)
75. Devilliersite (sapphirine: IMA2020-073) 9.0 [no] [no]
76. Devilline (devilline: IMA1971 s.p., 1864) 7.DD.30
  (IUPAC: calcium tetracopper hexahydro disulfate trihydrate)
77. Devitoite (astrophyllite, devitoite: IMA2009-010) 9.E?. [no]
78. Dewindtite (phosphuranylite: 1922) 8.EC.10
  (IUPAC: dihydrogen trilead hexauranyl tetraoxo tetraphosphate dodecahydrate)
79. Dewitite (chabournéite: IMA2019-098) 2.HD. [no] [no]
80. Diaboleite (perovskite: IMA2007 s.p., 1923) 3.DB.05
  (IUPAC: copper dilead dichloride tetrahydroxide)
81. Diadochite (amorphous: 1837) 8.DB.05
  Note: the amorphous form of triclinic destinezite.
82. Diamond (Y: old) 1.CB.10a
83. Diaoyudaoite (magnetoplumbite: IMA1985-005) 4.CC.45
  (IUPAC: sodium undecaluminium heptadecaoxide)
84. Diaphorite (Y: 1871) 2.JB.05
  (IUPAC: trisilver dilead triantimonide octasulfide)
85. Diaspore ("O(OH)" group: 1801) 4.FD.10
  (IUPAC: hydroaluminium oxide)
86. Dickinsonite-(KMnNa) (arrojadite: IMA2005-048, 1878) 8.BF.05
87. Dickite (kaolinite: 1930) 9.ED.05
88. Dickthomssenite (IMA2000-047) 4.HD.25
  (IUPAC: magnesium divanadium hexaoxide heptahydrate)
89. Diegogattaite (IMA2012-096) 9.E [no]
90. Dienerite (IMA2019-E, IMA2006-C) 2.0 [no] [no]
91. Dietrichite (halotrichite: 1878) 7.CB.85
  (IUPAC: zinc dialuminium tetrasulfate docosahydrate)
92. Dietzeite (Y: 1894) 4.KD.05
  (IUPAC: dicalcium diiodate chromate monohydrate)
93. Digenite (digenite: IMA1962 s.p., 1844) 2.BA.10
  (Cu_{1.8}S)
94. Dimorphite (Y: 1849) 2.FA.10
  (IUPAC: tetrarsenic trisulfide)
95. Dingdaohengite-(Ce) (chevkinite: IMA2005-014) 9.BE.70 [no]
96. Dinite (Y: 1852) 10.BA.15
97. Diopside (pyroxene: IMA1988 s.p., 1800) 9.DA.15
  (IUPAC: calcium magnesium hexaoxy disilicate)
98. Dioptase (Y: 1797) 9.CJ.30
  (IUPAC: copper trioxy silicate monohydrate)
99. Dioskouriite (IMA2015-106) 3.0 [no] [no]
  (IUPAC: calcium tetracopper tetrahydro hexachloride tetrahydrate)
100. Direnzoite (zeolitic tectosilicate: IMA2006-044) 9.GF.55 [no]
101. Dissakisite (epidote, allanite) 9.BG.05b
  1. Dissakisite-(Ce) (IMA1990-004) 9.BG.05b
  2. Dissakisite-(La) (IMA2003-007) 9.BG.05 [no]
102. Disulfodadsonite (dadsonite: IMA2011-076) 2.0 [no]
  (Pb_{11}Sb_{13}S_{30}(S_{2})_{0.5})
103. Dittmarite (Y: 1887) 8.CH.20
  (IUPAC: ammonium magnesium phosphate monohydrate)
104. Diversilite-(Ce) (IMA2002-043) 9.CB.10 [no]
105. Dixenite (hematolite: 1920) 8.BE.45
106. Djerfisherite (djerfisherite: IMA1965-028) 2.FC.05
107. Djurleite (IMA1967 s.p., 1962) 2.BA.05
  (IUPAC: hentricontacopper hexadecasulfide)
108. Dmisokolovite (IMA2013-079) 8.0 [no] [no]
  (IUPAC: tripotassium pentacopper aluminium dioxo(tetrarsenate))
109. Dmisteinbergite (dmisteinbergite: IMA1989-010) 9.EG.15
110. Dmitryivanovite (IMA2006-035) 4.BC.10 [no]
  (IUPAC: calcium dialuminium tetraoxide)
111. Dobrovolskyite (IMA2019-106) 7.0 [no] [no]
  (IUPAC: tetrasodium calcium trisulfate)
112. Dobšináite (roselite: IMA2020-081) [no] [no]
113. Dokuchaevite (IMA2018-012) 8.0 [no] [no]
  (IUPAC: octacopper chloro dioxotrivanadate)
114. Dolerophanite (natrochalcite: 1873) 7.BB.20
  (IUPAC: dicopper oxosulfate)
115. Dollaseite-(Ce) (epidote, dollaseite: IMA1987-K Rd) 9.BG.05
116. Dolomite (Y: 1792) 5.AB.10
  (IUPAC: calcium magnesium dicarbonate)
117. Doloresite (Y: 1957) 4.HE.30
  (IUPAC: trivanadium(IV) tetrahydro tetraoxide)
118. Domerockite (IMA2009-016) 8.C [no] [no]
  (IUPAC: tetracopper trihydro arsenate hydroxoarsenate monohydrate)
119. Domeykite (metalloid alloy: 1845) 2.AA.10b
  (IUPAC: tricopper arsenide)
  1. Domeykite-β (metalloid alloy: IMA2008-B, 1949 Rd) 2.AA. [no] [no]
120. Donbassite (chlorite: 1940) 9.EC.55
121. Dondoellite (IMA2021-048) 8.CG. [no] [no]
122. Dongchuanite (dongchuanite: IMA2021-058) 8.BG. [no] [no]
123. Donharrisite (IMA1987-007) 2.BD.20
  (IUPAC: trinickel trimercury nonasulfide)
124. Donnayite-(Y) (IMA1978-007) 5.CC.05
  (IUPAC: sodium tristrontium calcium yttrium hexacarbonate trihydrate)
125. Donowensite (IMA2020-067) 4.0 [no] [no]
126. Donpeacorite (pyroxene: IMA1982-045) 9.DA.05
  (IUPAC: (manganese(II),magnesium) hexaoxydisilicate)
127. Donwilhelmsite (IMA2018-113) 9.0 [no] [no]
  (IUPAC: calcium tetraluminium undecaoxy disilicate)
128. Dorallcharite (alunite, alunite: IMA1992-041) 7.BC.10
  (IUPAC: thallium triiron(III) hexahydro disulfate)
129. Dorfmanite (IMA1979-053) 8.CJ.60
  (IUPAC: disodium hydroxophosphate dihydrate)
130. Dorrite (sapphirine: IMA1987-054) 9.DH.40
131. Douglasite (Y: 1880) 3.CJ.20
  (IUPAC: dipotassium iron(II) tetrachloride dihydrate)
132. Dovyrenite (IMA2007-002) 9.BE.23 [no]
  (IUPAC: hexacalcium zirconium di(heptaoxodisilicate) tetrahydroxyl)
133. Downeyite (IMA1974-063) 4.DE.05
  (IUPAC: selenium(IV) oxide)
134. Doyleite (IMA1980-041) 4.FE.10
  (IUPAC: aluminium trihydroxide)
135. Dozyite (corrensite: IMA1993-042) 9.EC.60 [no]
  A 1:1 regular interstratification of trioctahedral serpentine and trioctahedral chlorite units.
136. Dravertite (IMA2014-104) 7.AB. [no] [no]
  (IUPAC: copper magnesium disulfate)
137. Dravite (tourmaline: 1884) 9.CK.05
138. Drechslerite (IMA2019-061) 2.0 [no] [no]
139. Dresserite (dundasite: IMA1968-027) 5.DB.10
  (IUPAC: dibarium tetraluminium octahydro tetracarbonate trihydrate)
140. Dreyerite (zircon: IMA1978-077) 8.AD.35
  (IUPAC: bismuth vanadate)
141. Dritsite (hydrotalcite: IMA2019-017) 4.0 [no] [no]
142. Drobecite (starkeyite: IMA2002-034) 7.CB.15 [no] [no]
  (IUPAC: cadmium sulfate tetrahydrate)
143. Droninoite (hydrotalcite: IMA2008-003) 3.DA.60 [no]
144. Drugmanite (IMA1978-081) 8.BH.15
  (IUPAC: dilead iron(III) dihydro phosphate hydroxophosphate)
145. Drysdallite (molybdenite: IMA1973-027) 2.EA.30
  (IUPAC: molybdenum diselenide)
146. Dualite (eudialyte: IMA2005-019) 9.CO.10 [no]
147. Dufrénite (dufrénite: 1803) 8.DK.15
148. Dufrénoysite (sartorite: 1845) 2.HC.05d
  (IUPAC: dilead diarsenide pentasulfide)
149. Duftite (adelite: 1920) 8.BH.35
  (IUPAC: lead copper hydro arsenate)
150. Dugganite (dugganite: IMA1978-034) 8.DL.20
  (IUPAC: trilead trizinc tellurate diarsenate)
151. Dukeite (IMA1999-021) 7.DF.80 [no]
152. Dumontite (Y: 1924) 8.EC.15
  (IUPAC: dilead triuranyl dioxodiphosphate pentahydrate)
153. Dumortierite (dumortierite: IMA2013 s.p., 1881 Rd) 9.AJ.10
  (IUPAC: aluminium hexaluminium octadecaoxy borotrisilicate)
154. Dundasite (dundasite: 1894) 5.DB.10
  (IUPAC: lead dialuminium tetrahydro dicarbonate hydrate)
155. Durangite (titanite: 1869) 8.BH.10
  (IUPAC: sodium aluminium fluo-arsenate)
156. Duranusite (IMA1973-003) 2.FA.05
  (IUPAC: tetrarsenide sulfide)
157. Dusmatovite (milarite: IMA1994-010) 9.CM.05 [no]
158. Dussertite (alunite, crandallite: IMA1999 s.p., 1925 Rd) 8.BL.10
  (IUPAC: barium triiron(III) hexahydro arsenate hydroxoarsenate)
159. Dutkevichite-(Ce) (joaquinite: IMA2019-102) 9.CE. [no] [no]
160. Dutrowite (tourmaline: IMA2019-082) 9.CK. [no] [no]
161. Duttonite ("O(OH)" group: 1956) 4.HE.35
162. Dwornikite (kieserite: IMA1981-031) 7.CB.05
  (IUPAC: nickel sulfate monohydrate)
163. Dymkovite (seelite: IMA2010-087) 4.J?. [no]
  (IUPAC: nickel diuranyl diarsenate(III) heptahydrate)
164. Dypingite (IMA1970-011) 5.DA.05
  (IUPAC: pentamagnesium dihydro tetracarbonate pentahydrate)
165. Dyrnaesite-(La) (vitusite: IMA2014-070) 8.0 [no] [no]
166. Dyscrasite (allargentum: 1832) 2.AA.35
167. Dzhalindite (perovskite, söhngeite: IMA1967 s.p., 1963) 4.FC.05
  (IUPAC: indium trihydroxide)
168. Dzharkenite (pyrite: IMA1993-054) 2.EB.05a
  (IUPAC: iron diselenide)
169. Dzhuluite (garnet: IMA2010-064) 4.0 [no]
  (IUPAC: tricalcium (tin antimony) tri(iron(III) tetraoxide))
170. Dzierżanowskite (IMA2014-032) 2.BA. [no] [no]
  (IUPAC: calcium dicopper disulfide)
