= Delindeite =

Rare titanium sorosilicate mineral

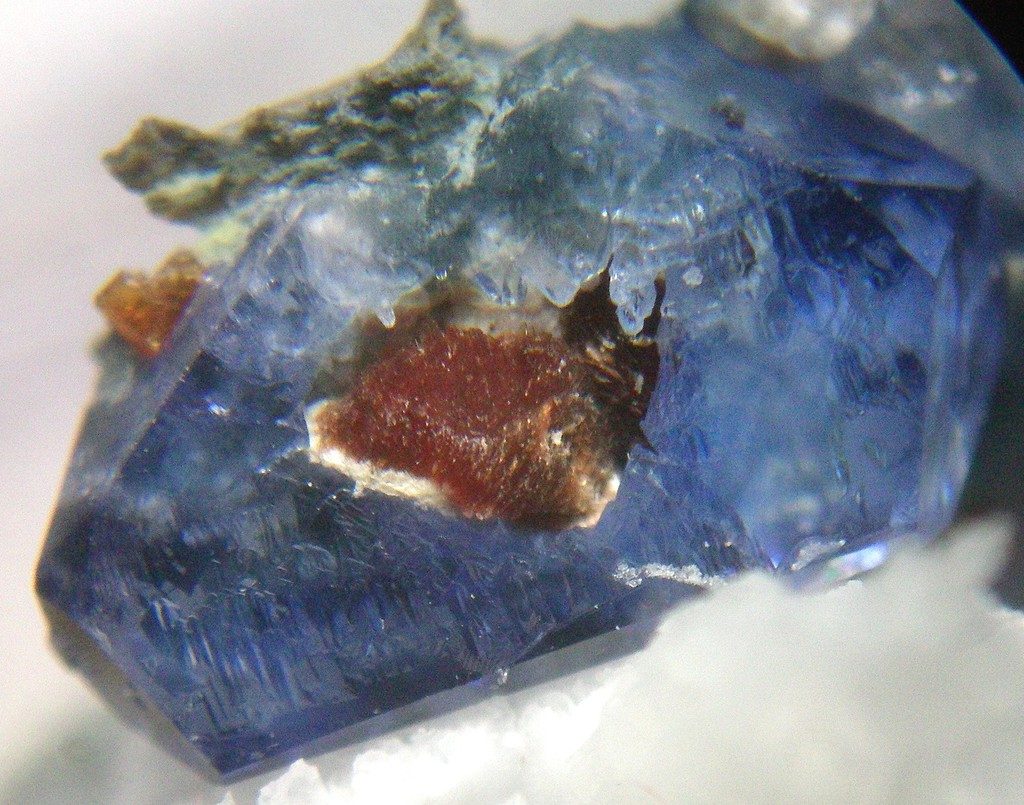
- Platy crystals of delindeite (red) on benitoite from California State Gem Mine, Santa Rita Peak, California

General
- Category: Sorosilicate minerals, seidozerite supergroup, lamprophyllite group
- Formula: (Na,K)_{2}(Ba,Ca)_{2}(Ti,Fe,Al)_{3}(Si_{2}O_{7})_{2}O_{2}(OH)_{2}·2H_{2}O
- IMA symbol: Dde
- Strunz classification: 9.BE.60
- Dana classification: 56.2.6c.2
- Crystal system: Monoclinic
- Crystal class: 2/m - Prismatic
- Space group: B2/m (no. 12)
- Unit cell: 1

Identification
- Formula mass: 902.60 g/mol
- Color: Light pinkish-grey to red
- Crystal habit: Lath-shaped crystals or flakes, forming compact spherulitic aggregates, to 1 mm, some are fibrous
- Twinning: Submicroscopic on {100}
- Cleavage: Distinct/Good [001] Good
- Fracture: Irregular/Uneven
- Tenacity: Brittle
- Luster: Resinous, Pearly
- Streak: White
- Diaphaneity: Translucent
- Specific gravity: 3.3
- Optical properties: Biaxial (+)
- Refractive index: nα = 1.79 nβ = 1.825 nγ = 1.982
- Birefringence: δ = 0.192
- Pleochroism: Non-pleochroic
- 2V angle: Measured: 54°, Calculated: 54°
- Dispersion: single
- Common impurities: Mg

Delindeite is a very rare titanium sorosilicate mineral in the lamprophyllite group and seidozerite supergroup. It was named in honor of Henry Samuel de Linde, an amateur mineralogist who was the former owner of the Diamond Jo quarry, Arkansas, where the mineral was first discovered in 1987. It is a secondary mineral formed under oxidizing conditions from a titanium-bearing nepheline and syenite.

Delindeite is also part of a rare group of minerals called titanosilicates. With only around 30 known species discovered as of 2025, they are quite diverse. Delindeite specifically is a barium titanosilicate.

Other than Diamond Jo quarry, delindeite has also been found at the California State Gem Mine in San Benito County, California.
