= Seidozerite =

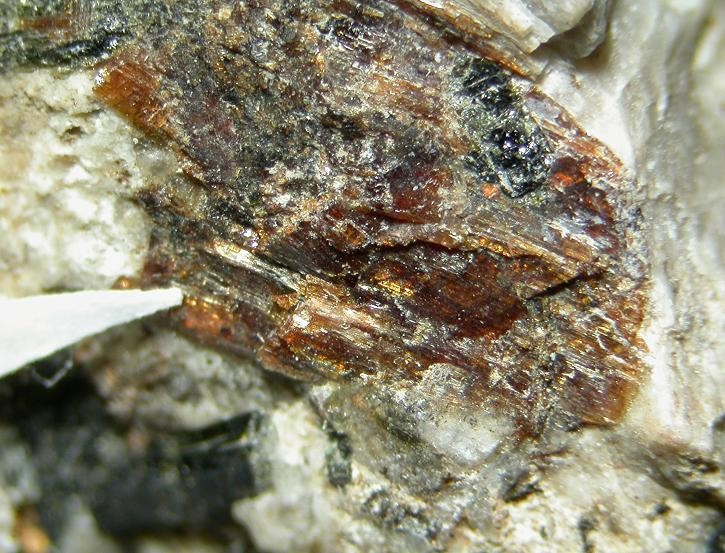
- Seidozerite from 'Pegmatite No. 58', Lake Seydozero, Lovozero massif, Kola peninsula, Murmansk Oblast

General
- Category: Sorosilicates
- Formula: Na_{4}MnZr_{2}Ti(Si_{2}O_{7})_{2}O_{2}F_{2}
- IMA symbol: Sdz
- Strunz classification: 9.BE.25
- Crystal system: Monoclinic
- Crystal class: Prismatic (2/m) (same H-M symbol)
- Space group: P2/c

Identification

Seidozerite is a sorosilicate from the seidozerite supergroup (a "titanium disilicate"). It was first described by Semenov, Kazakova and Simonov in 1958. Its chemical formula is Na_{4}MnZr_{2}Ti(Si_{2}O_{7})_{2}O_{2}F_{2} and its type locality is 'Pegmatite No. 58', Lake Seydozero, Lovozero massif, Kola Peninsula, Murmansk Oblast.
