= Alan Drysdall =

English geologist

Alan Roy Drysdall (1934 – 11 January 2017) was an English geologist who worked in southern Africa. The mineral Drysdallite was named after him. Drysdall was a noted philatelist and a signatory to the Roll of Distinguished Philatelists.

== Early life ==
Alan Drysdall was born in Southampton in 1933. He received his doctorate in Geology from the University of Southampton in 1957.

== Career ==
Drysdall was the director of the Zambian geological survey. The mineral Drysdallite was named after him.

== Philately ==
Outside work, Drysdall was a noted philatelist who was a stalwart of the Rhodesia, Transvall and Natal Study Circles. He signed the Roll of Distinguished Philatelists in 2003. He also signed the Roll of Distinguished Philatelists of Southern Africa.

== Selected publications ==
=== Geology ===
- Drysdall, A. R. ????. The tin belt of the Southern Province, summary report, 2nd edition. Lusaka: Government Printer.
- Drysdall, A. R., and P. D. Denman, N. J. Money. 1967. Some aspects of the geology of the Siankondobo coalfield. Lusaka: Government Printer.
- Drysdall, A. R. et al. 19??a. Coal resources of the Zambezi Valley, II. Siankodobo – The Kanzinze basin, geology of the shafts. Lusaka: Government Printer.
  - 19??b. Coal resources of the Zambezi Valley III, Siankodobo- the Izuma Kanzinze basin. Lusaka: Government Printer.
  - 19??c. Coal resources of the Zambezi Valley IV: Sikankodobo- The Norfthern Part of the Kanzinze basin. Lusaka: Government Printer.

=== Philately ===
- Mashonaland: A Postal History, 1890-96
- Transvaal - Revenue and Telegraph Stamps 1995
- Rhodesia's Role in the Second Anglo-Boer War
