= Sieidi =

Sami cultural item

Sieidis (Northern Sami: sieidi, Finnish: seita, Swedish: sejte, Russian: сейд) are Sami cultural items, usually a rock with unusual shape. Sieidis are found in nature in certain sacred places, for example at the sea or river beaches or on the mountain. The word sieidi has also been used for holy rocks or wooden figures that have undergone some processing. The victory was a symbol of the divine power ruling over the natural resources that humans needed for their survival. Samis sacrificed parts of their catch at sea to get a successful hunting or fishing in the future.

In southern Sami, the name varies between viero-gierkie (sacrifice stone), viero-moere (sacrificial wood), soul-gierkie (goose-goat) and soul-nut (goose-tree).

== Physical characteristics ==
Each stone is different from the others, and they vary in form and size. They might be small rocks below a meter in height or tall stones of more than ten meters. They don't have specific forms, though sometimes they are reminiscent of anthropomorphic features or have other peculiar forms. Their natural form makes it difficult to recognize them in the Sami landscape and not confuse them with other normal stones. In fact, most of the sieidis which are still known these days are remembered because of written or oral traditions, but other sieidi sites have been probably forgotten.

== Rituals and sacrifices ==
One of the most relevant features of the Sami sacred landscape, the sieidis, consist of wood poles or, more commonly, of stones not modified by humans. Many sacrifices occurred at sieidis sites, and these were always connected to the lives of the Sami population. Sami used to do offers and sacrifices to ask help to the sieidis, for example during sickness, but also for assistance in everyday's tasks and duties. Fisherman offered fish before going fishing and others offered meat before going hunting. The relationship between these stones and the population was considered to be reciprocal. In fact, sacrifices were usually promised before trips and hunt or fishing expeditions; if the trips were a success the Sami respected their promises, if not they could destroy the sieidi which didn't help them. Meat, fish and bones were the most common offers, but there were also other types which included coins, metal objects, jewelry, cheese, and glass.

== Gallery ==
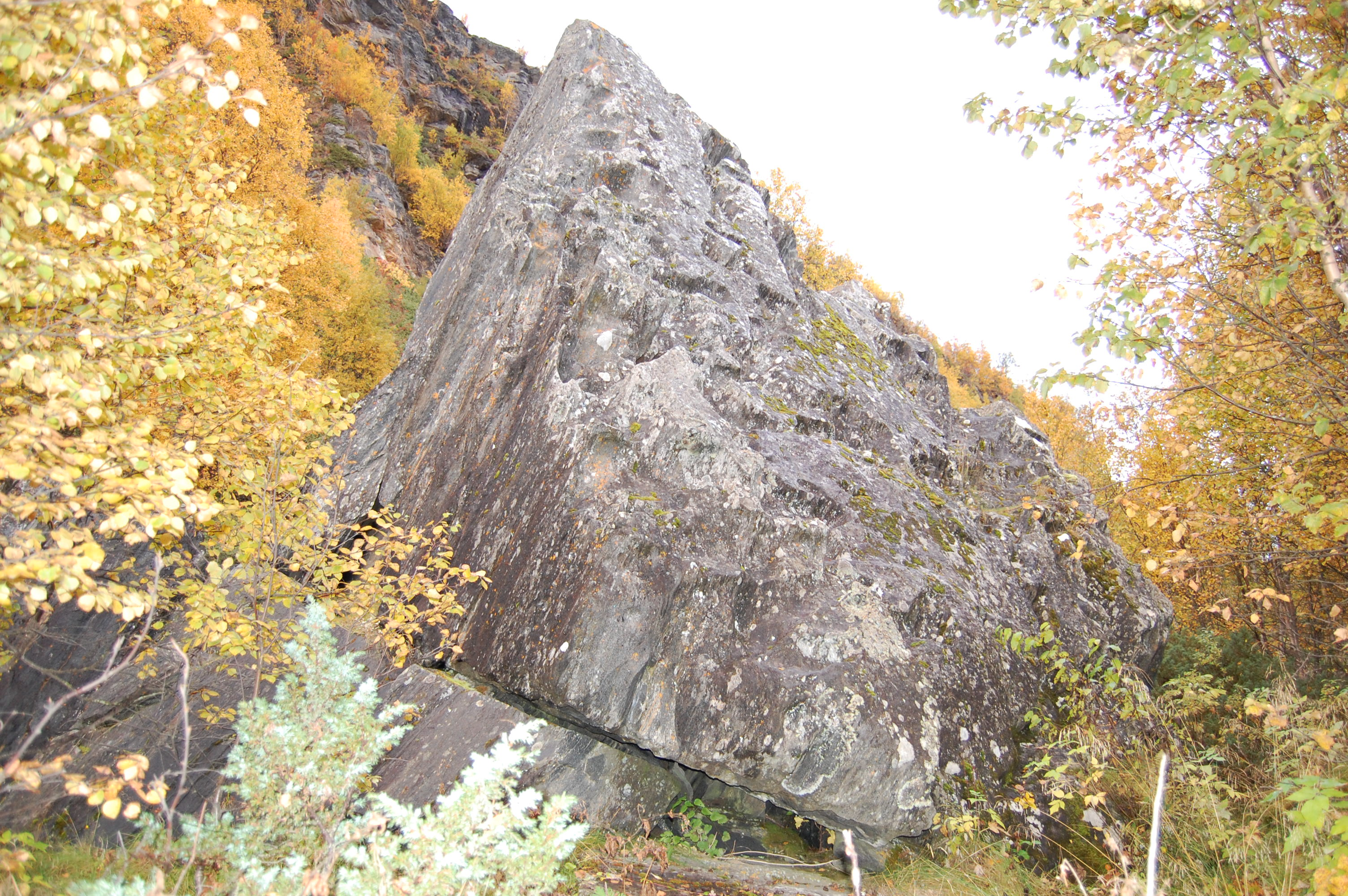
Siedi in Balsfjord.

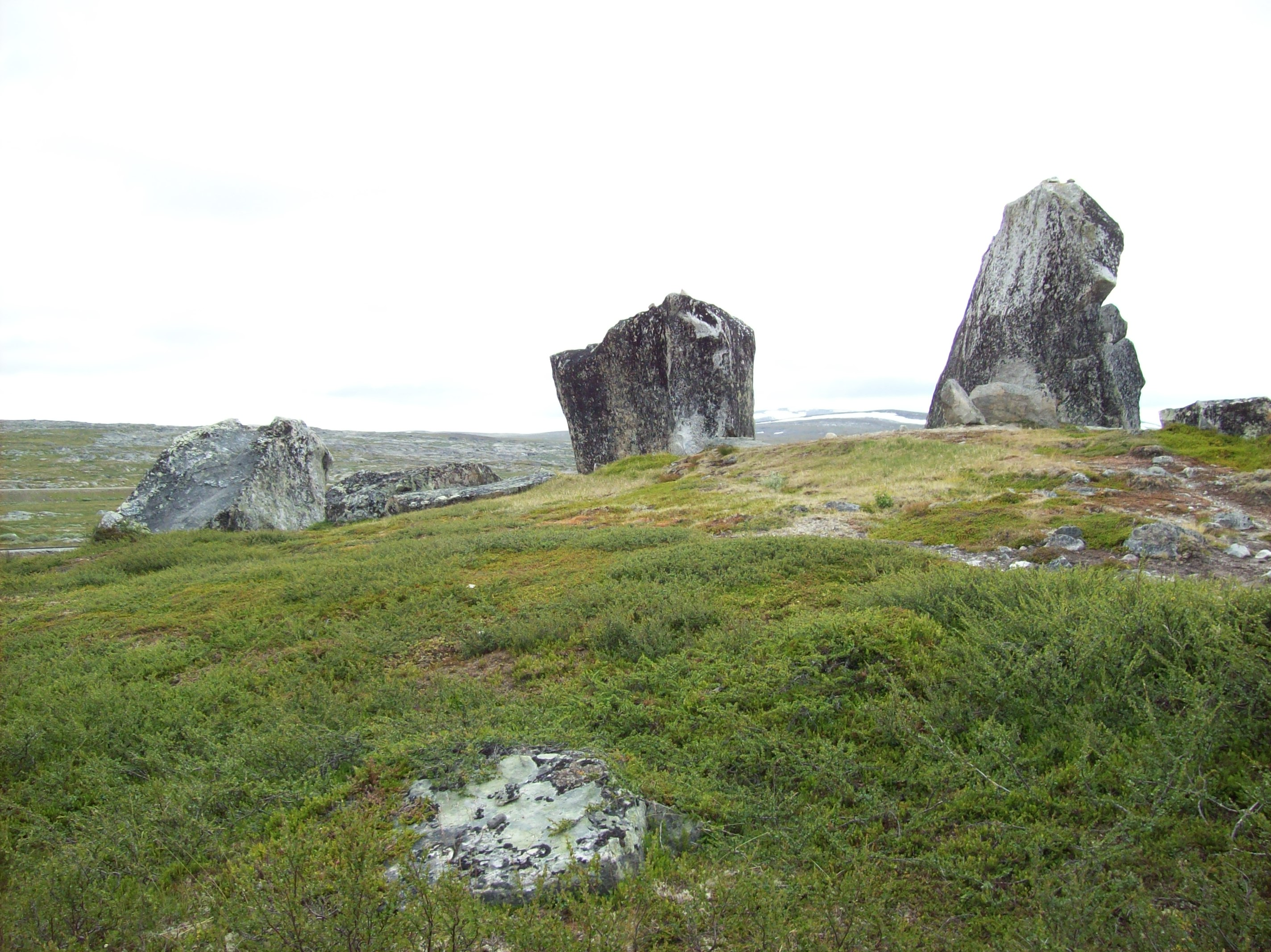
Siedi in Saltfjellet.

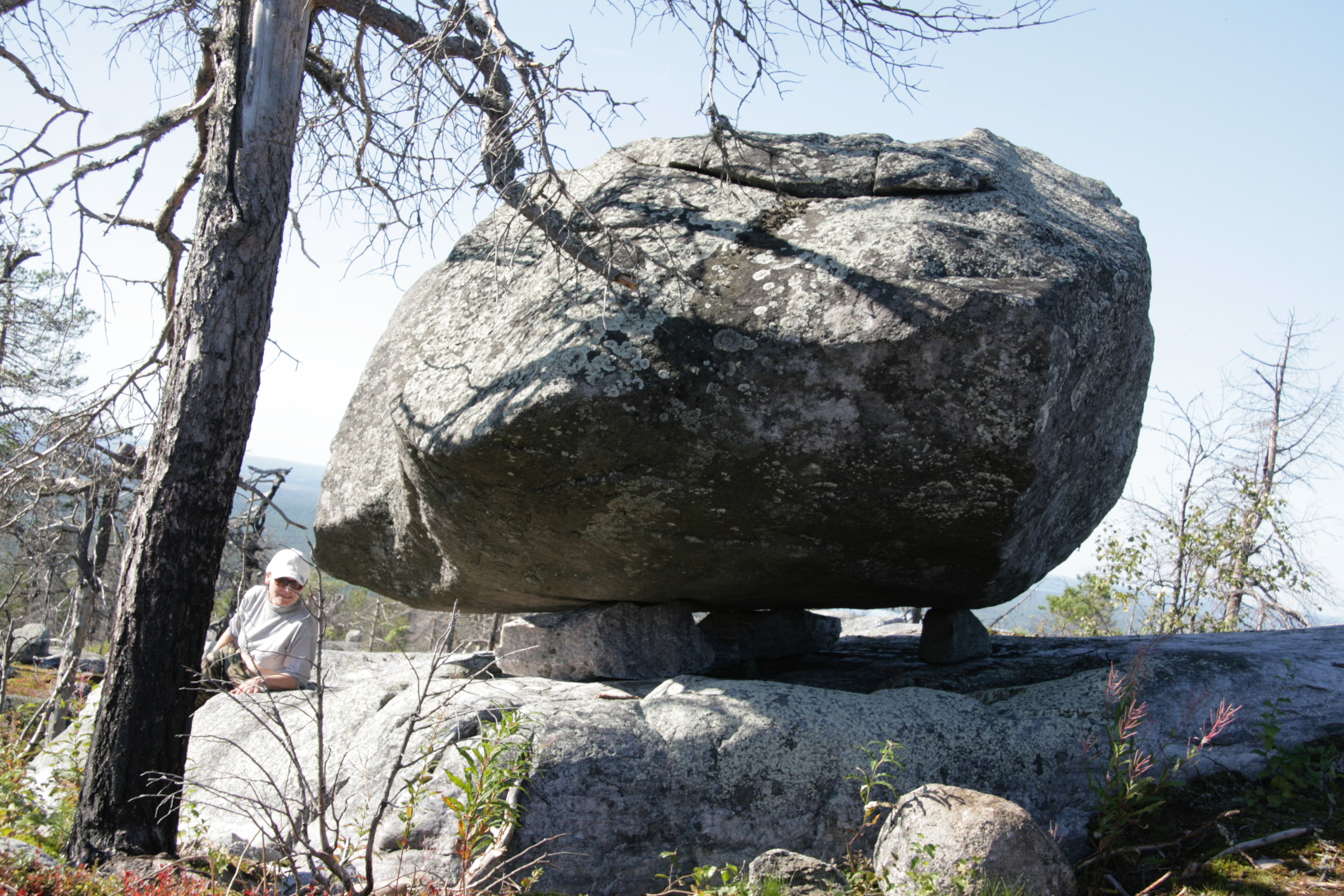
Siedi on the Mount of Vottovaara in Karelia

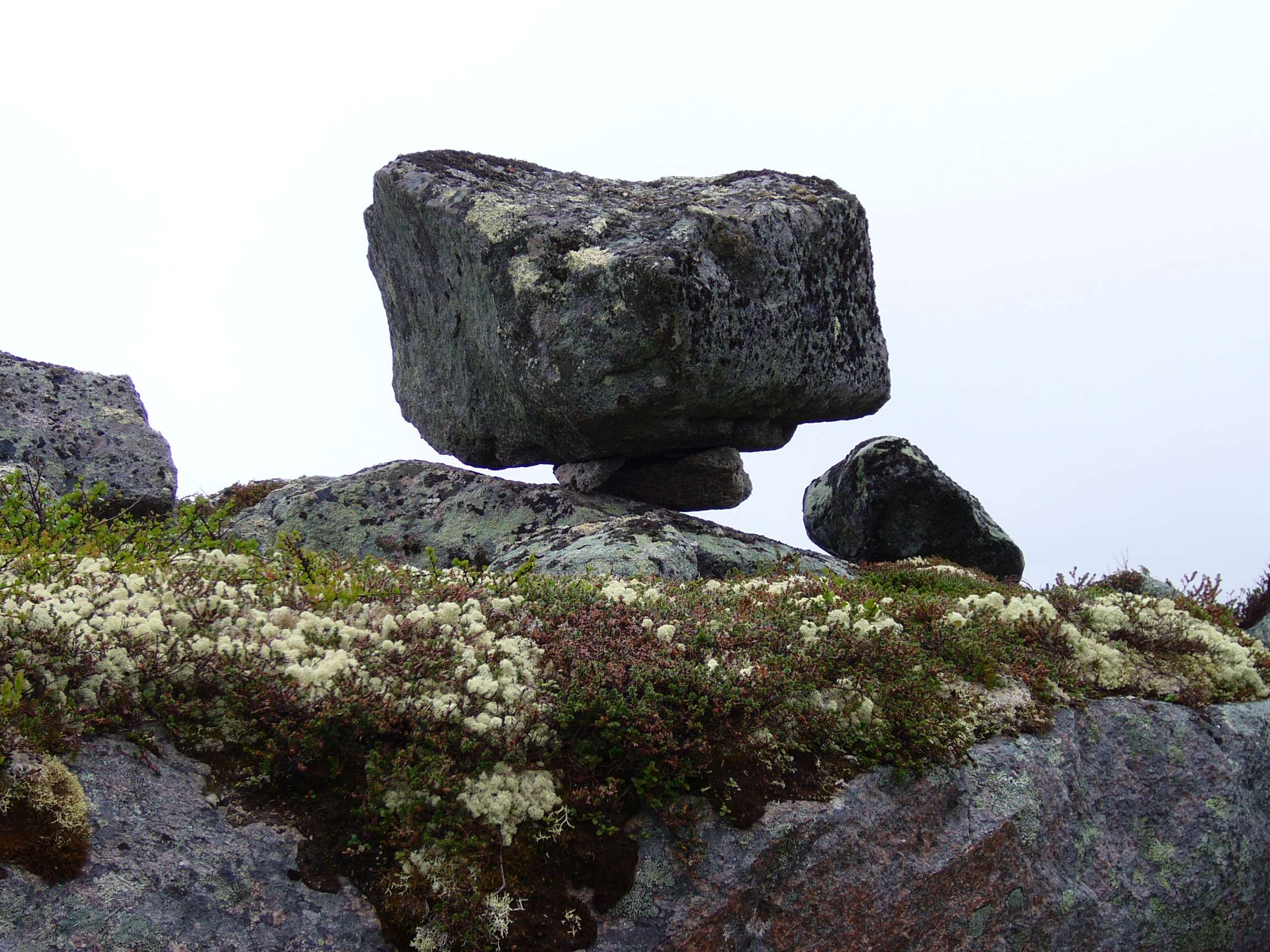
Siedi near the village of Tumanny

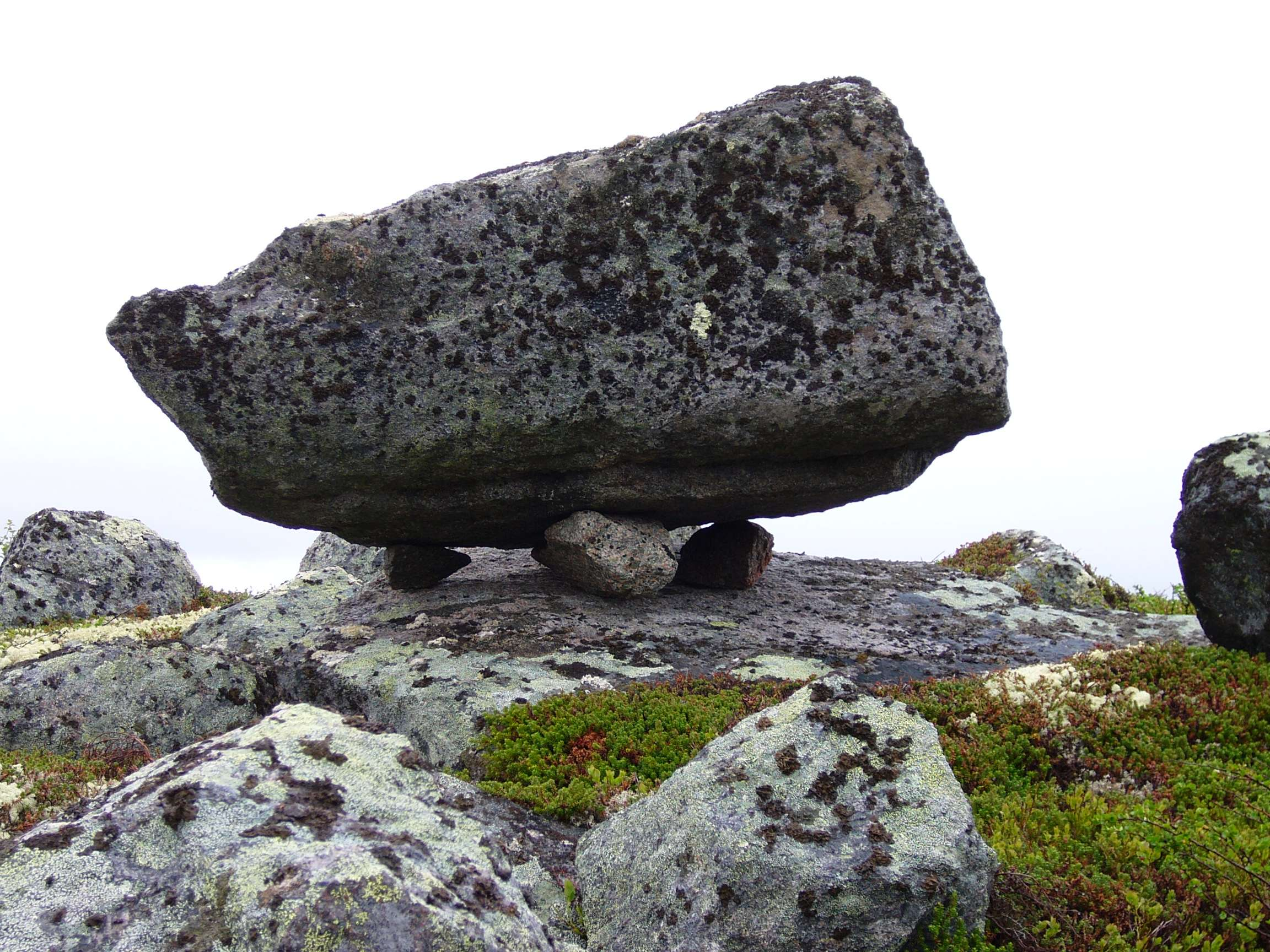
The same siedi near Tumanny

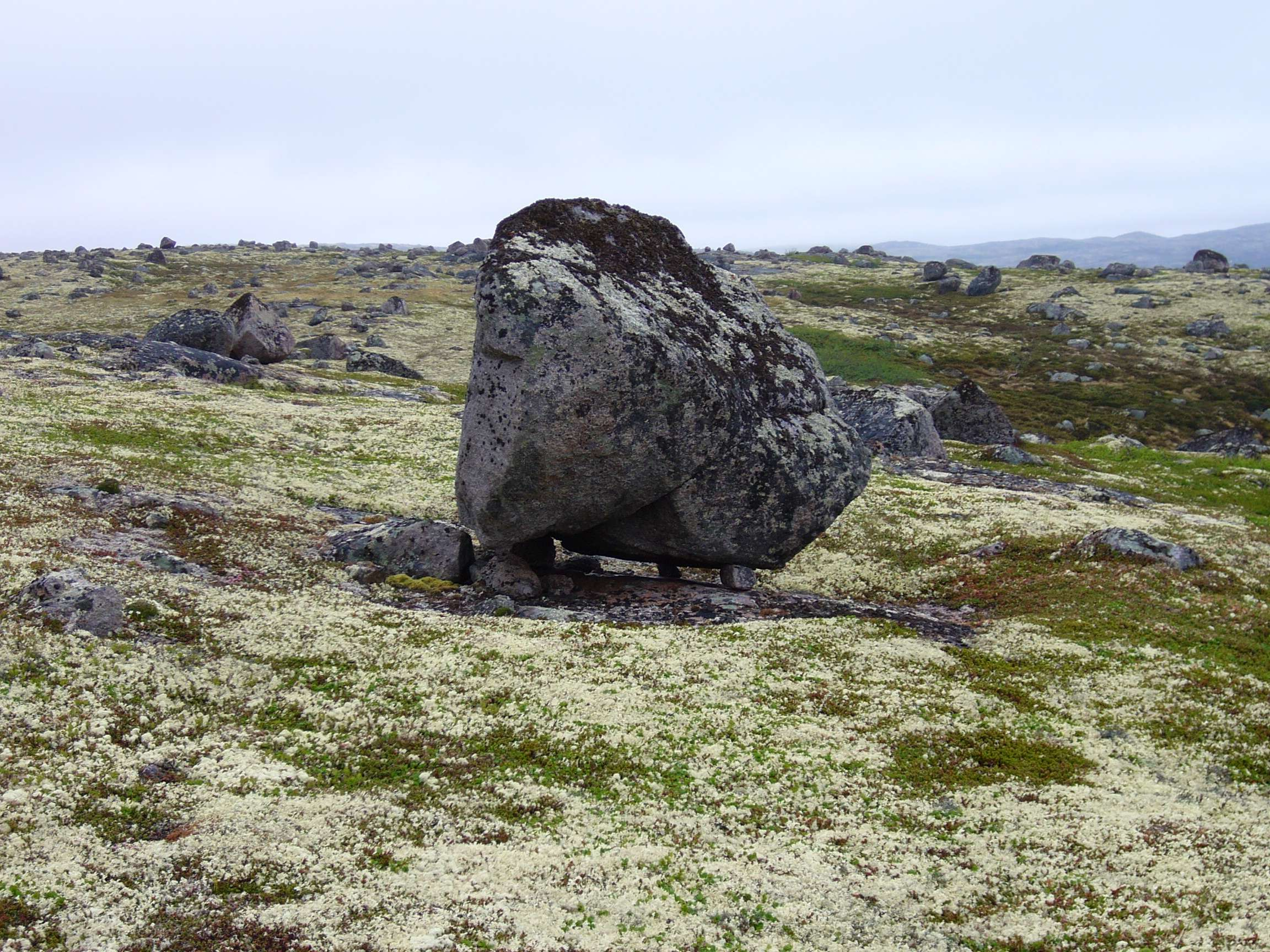
Siedi near Tumanny

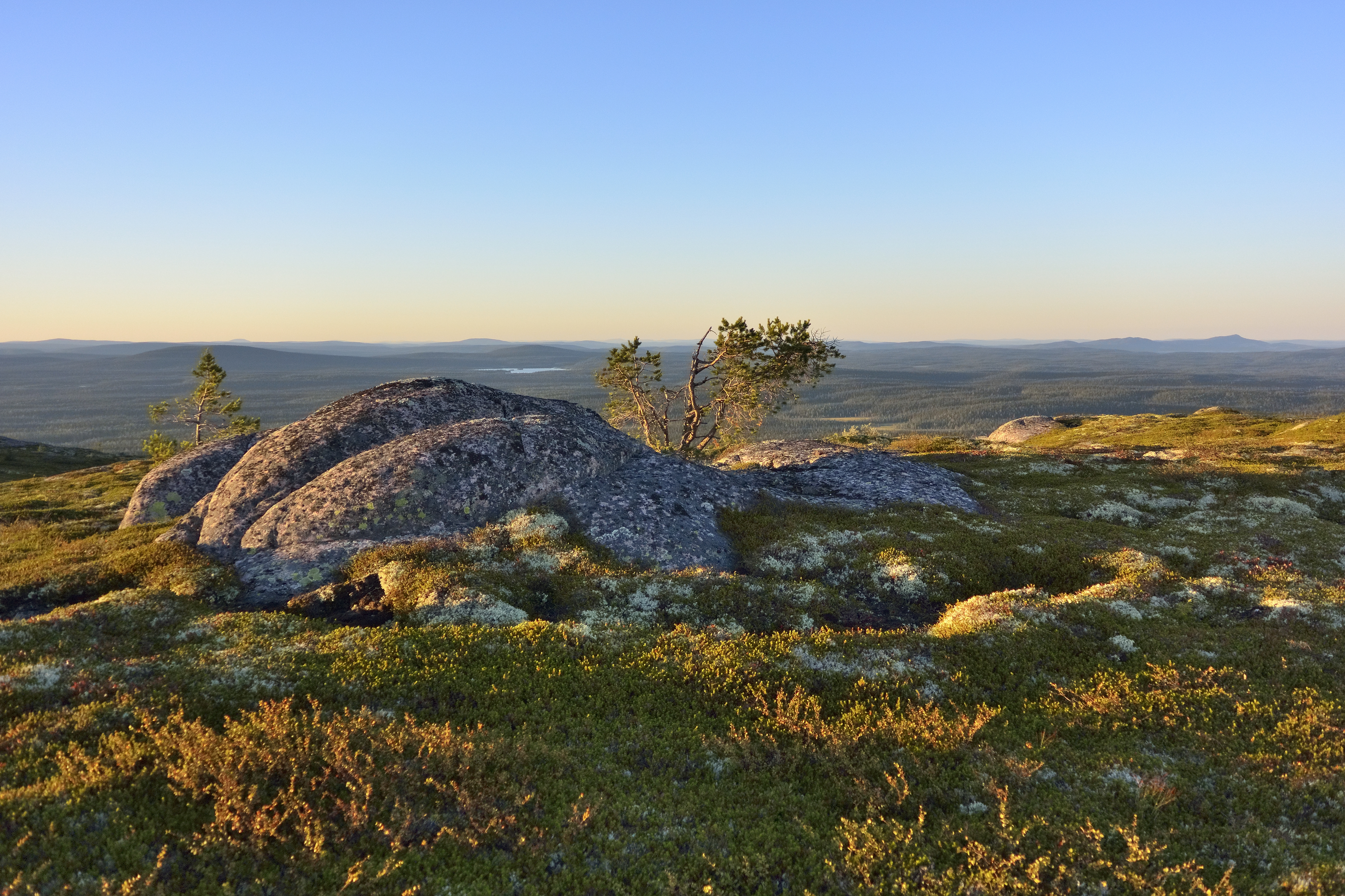
Siedi at the top of Nuorunen

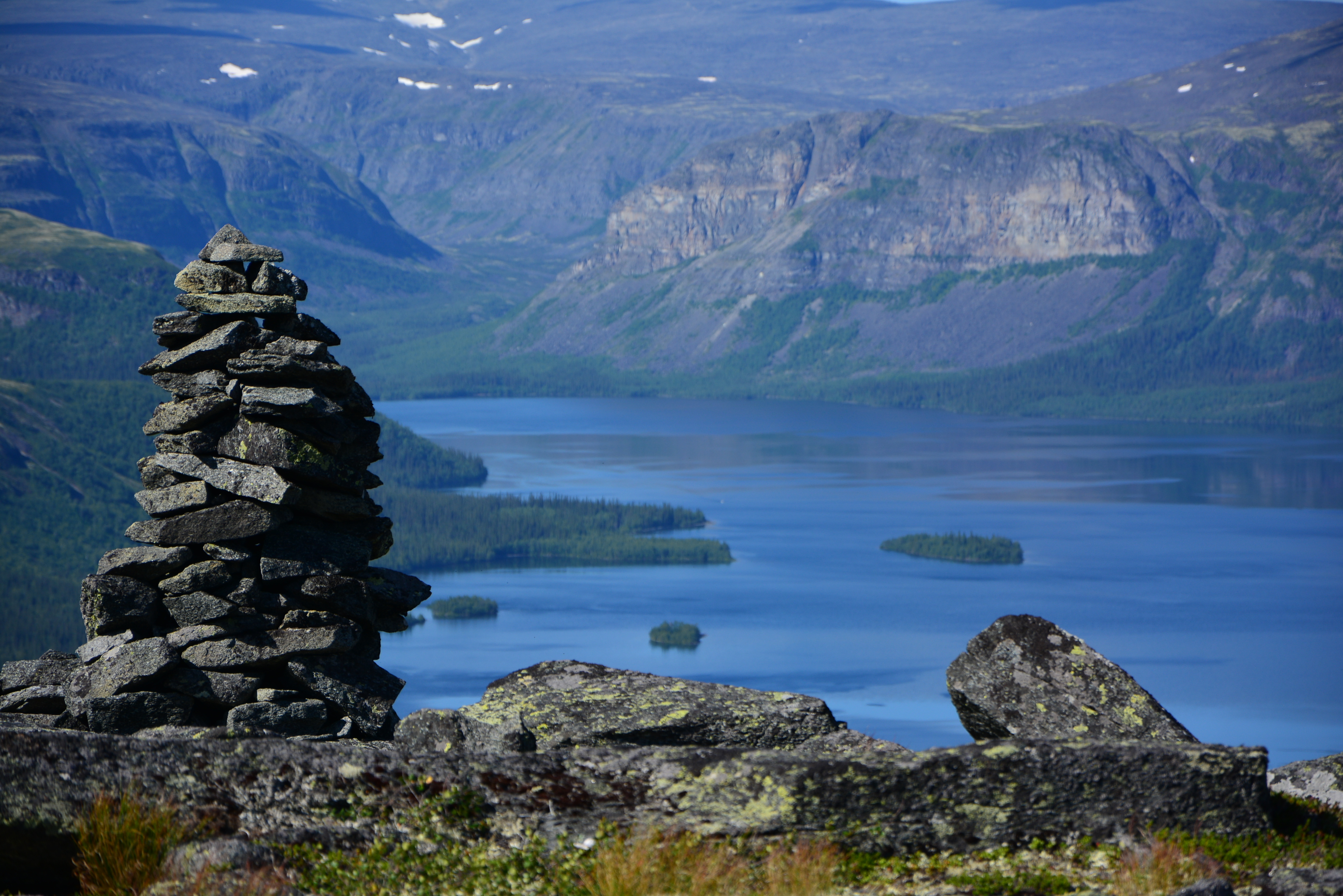
Man-made siedi near the lake Seydozero

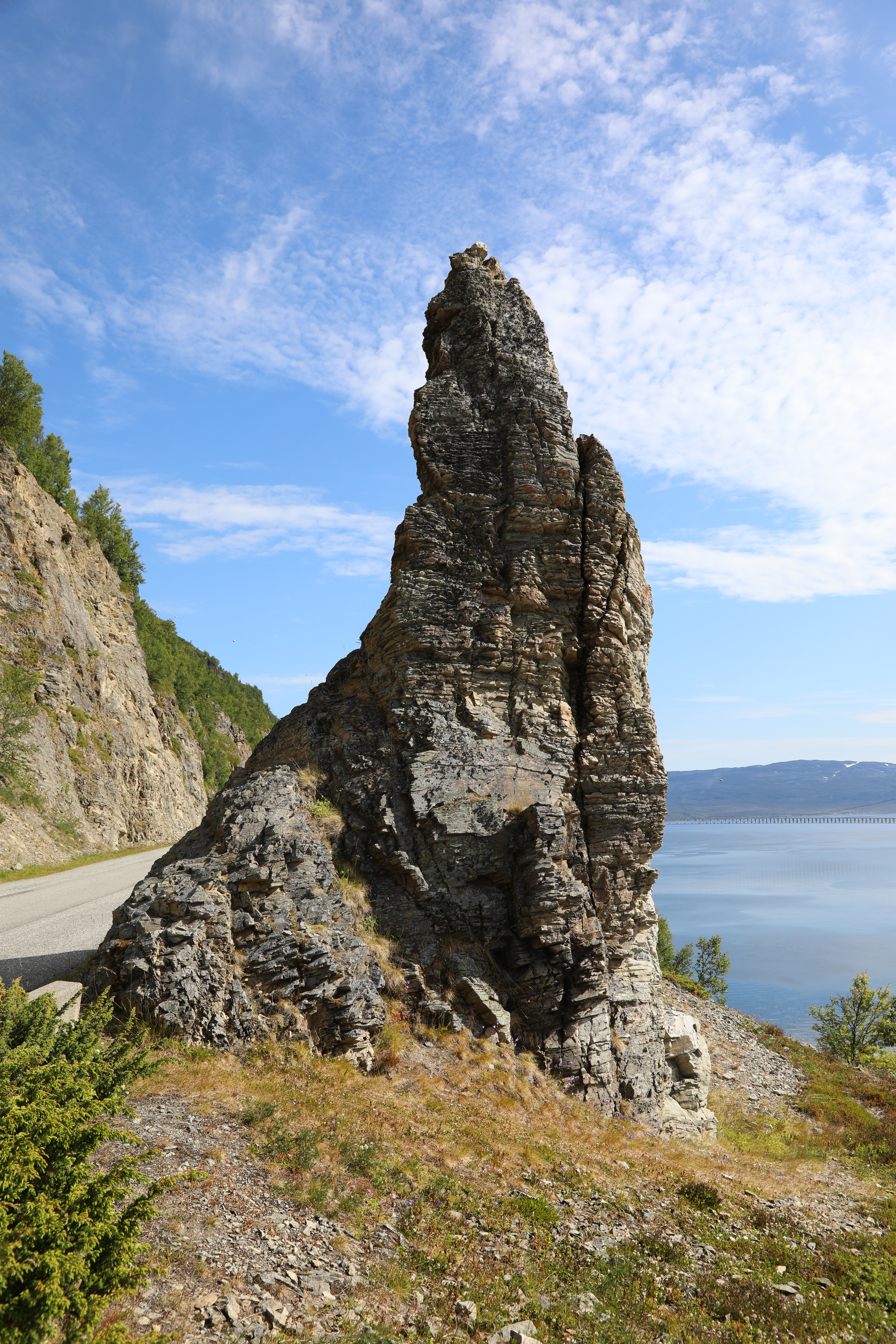
Sami rock of Áhkánjárstábba, near Kvalsund, Norway

== See also ==
- Iwakura rock

== Bibliography ==
- Äikäs, Tiina (2022). "What Makes a Stone a Sieidi, or How to Recognize a Holy Place?". Culture Crossroads. 5 (1): 14–24. doi:10.55877/cc.vol5.213. S2CID 253570159.
