= Lake Seydozero =

Lake in Murmansk Oblast, Russia

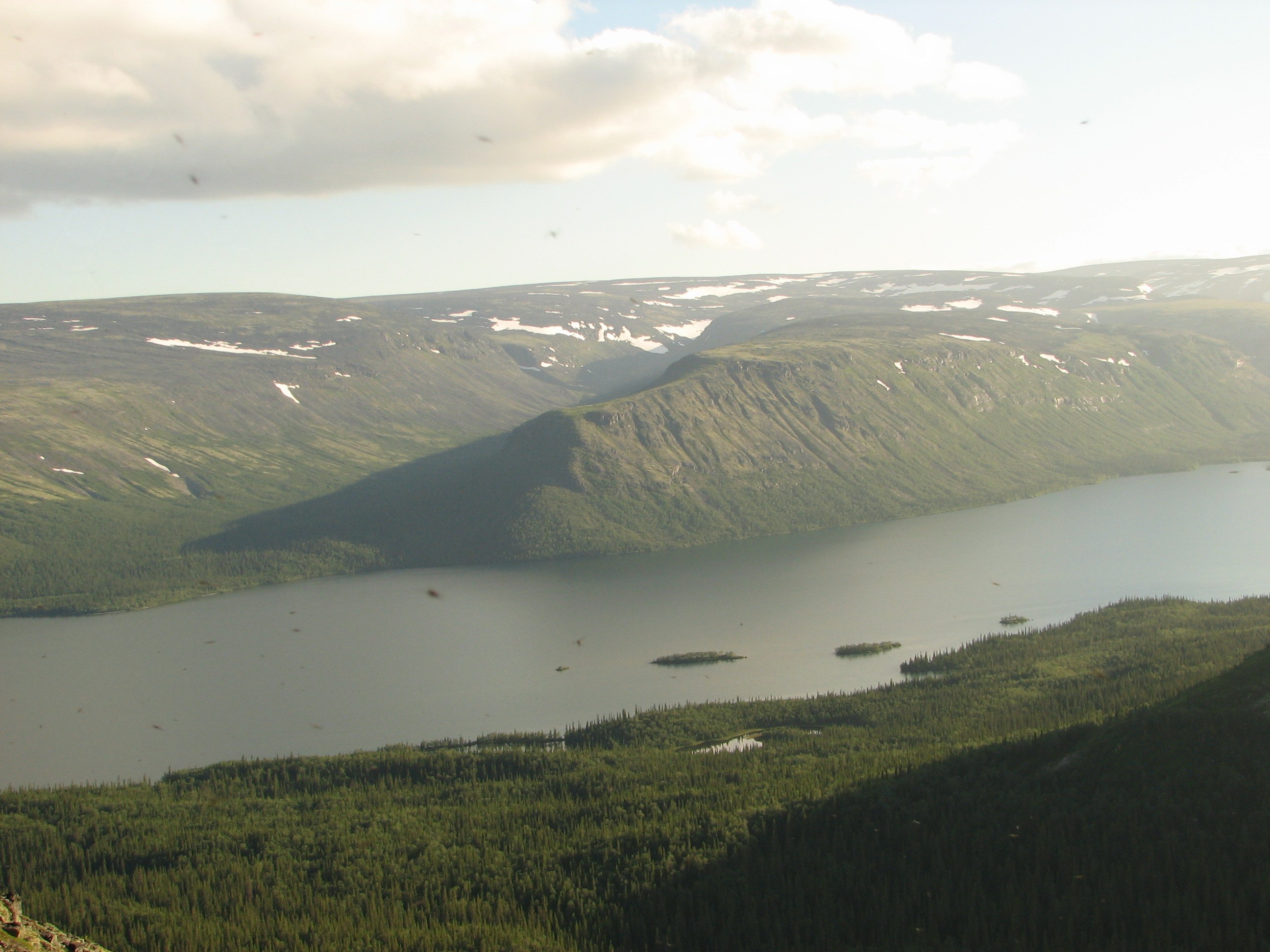

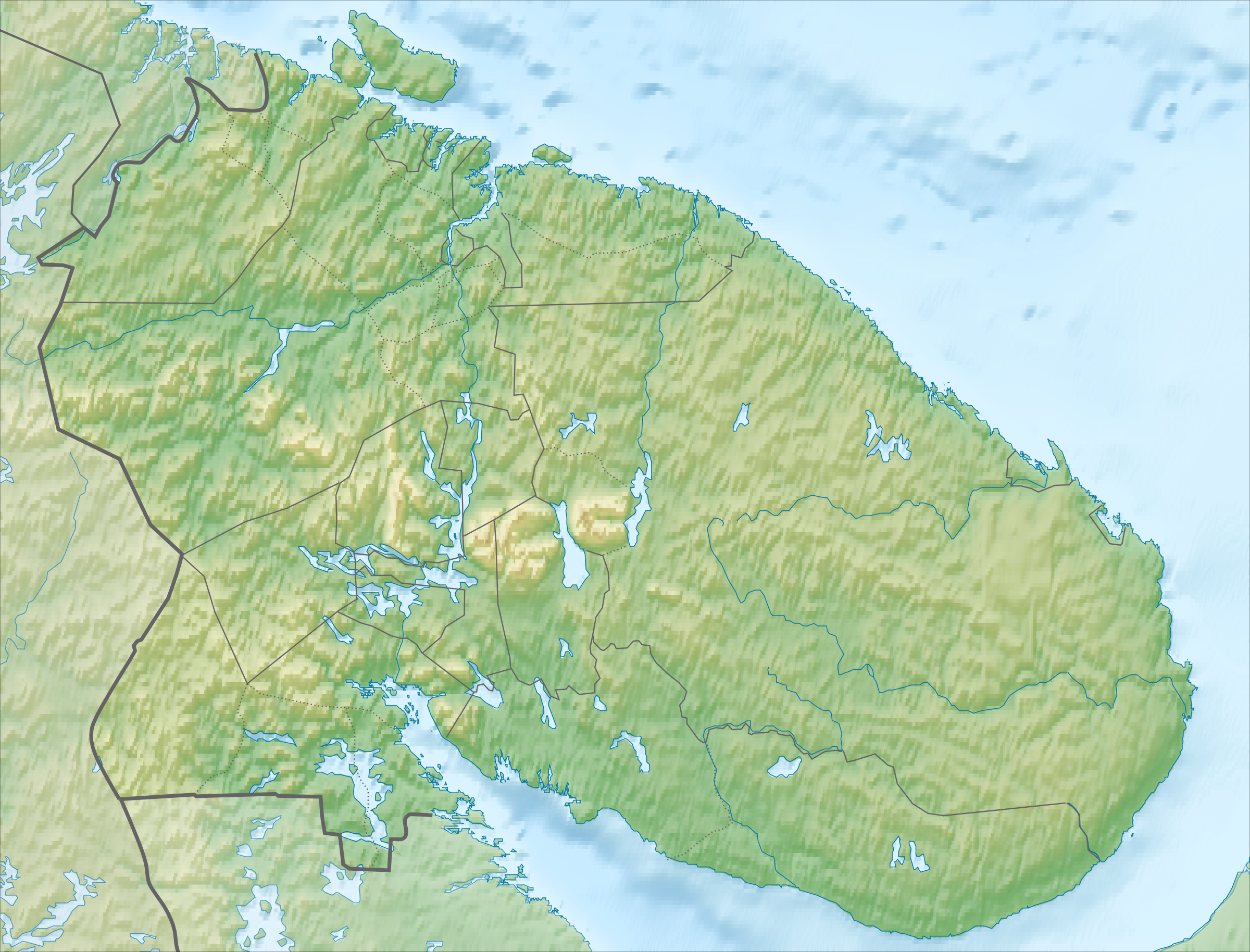
- Location within Murmansk Oblast Location within Russia
- Location: Kola Peninsula, Murmansk Oblast
- Coordinates: 67°49′N 34°51′E
- Type: natural lake, reservoir
- Basin countries: Russia
- Max. length: 8 km (5.0 mi)
- Max. width: 3 km (1.9 mi)
- Surface elevation: 189 m (620 ft)

Lake Seydozero, also known as Seydyavr (Russian: Сейдозеро, romanized: Seydozero, Kildin Sami: Сейдъявврь, romanized: Sejdjavvr') is a lake located on the Kola Peninsula in Murmansk Oblast, Russia. It lies within the Lovozero Massif, a horseshoe-shaped mountain range in the central part of the peninsula. The lake is situated at an elevation of 189 meters above sea level and measures approximately 8 km in length and 1.5–2.5 km in width.

The Elmorayok River flows into Lake Seydozero, while the Seydyavryok River flows out of it, carrying its waters into Lake Lovozero.

The name Seyd comes from the Sámi language and means "sacred," reflecting the traditional spiritual beliefs of the local Sámi people, for whom this area has long held religious and cultural significance. The lake is considered a monument of Sámi history and culture.

The waters of Lake Seydozero are low in minerals but have a high phosphorus content. Its plankton composition differs significantly from that of other lakes on the Kola Peninsula. Three forms of whitefish inhabit the lake, each spawning at a different time of year. This contributes to an unusual for arctic lakes ecological phenomenon: the high fish productivity of the lake.

The slopes of the surrounding mountains are home to unique mineralogical formations. Lichens, mosses, and higher vascular plants listed in the Red Data Book of the Murmansk Oblast grow in the area. The valley is also rich in historical and religious sites of the Sámi people, most notably the revered Sámi sieidi Kuiva, located on the northwestern shore of the lake.

== Cultural significance ==
Seydozero holds spiritual and cultural importance for the indigenous Sámi people of the Kola Peninsula. The name of the lake itself is derived from the Sámi word sieidi—a term referring to sacred places or objects believed to possess spiritual power. Throughout the region, natural formations such as rocks or hills with unusual shapes were often associated with sieidi and served as sites for ritual offerings and communication with spirits.

One of the most well-known legends associated with Seydozero concerns the giant spirit Kuiva. According to local lore, Kuiva was an enemy of the Sámi people who was struck down by a thunderbolt sent by the gods, leaving his shadow imprinted on the cliff wall near the lake. A massive, human-shaped dark silhouette—measuring approximately 30 by 70 meters—can be seen on the rock face. Of natural origin, it is revered by the Sámi as a sacred image and spiritual guardian of the area.

== Gallery ==
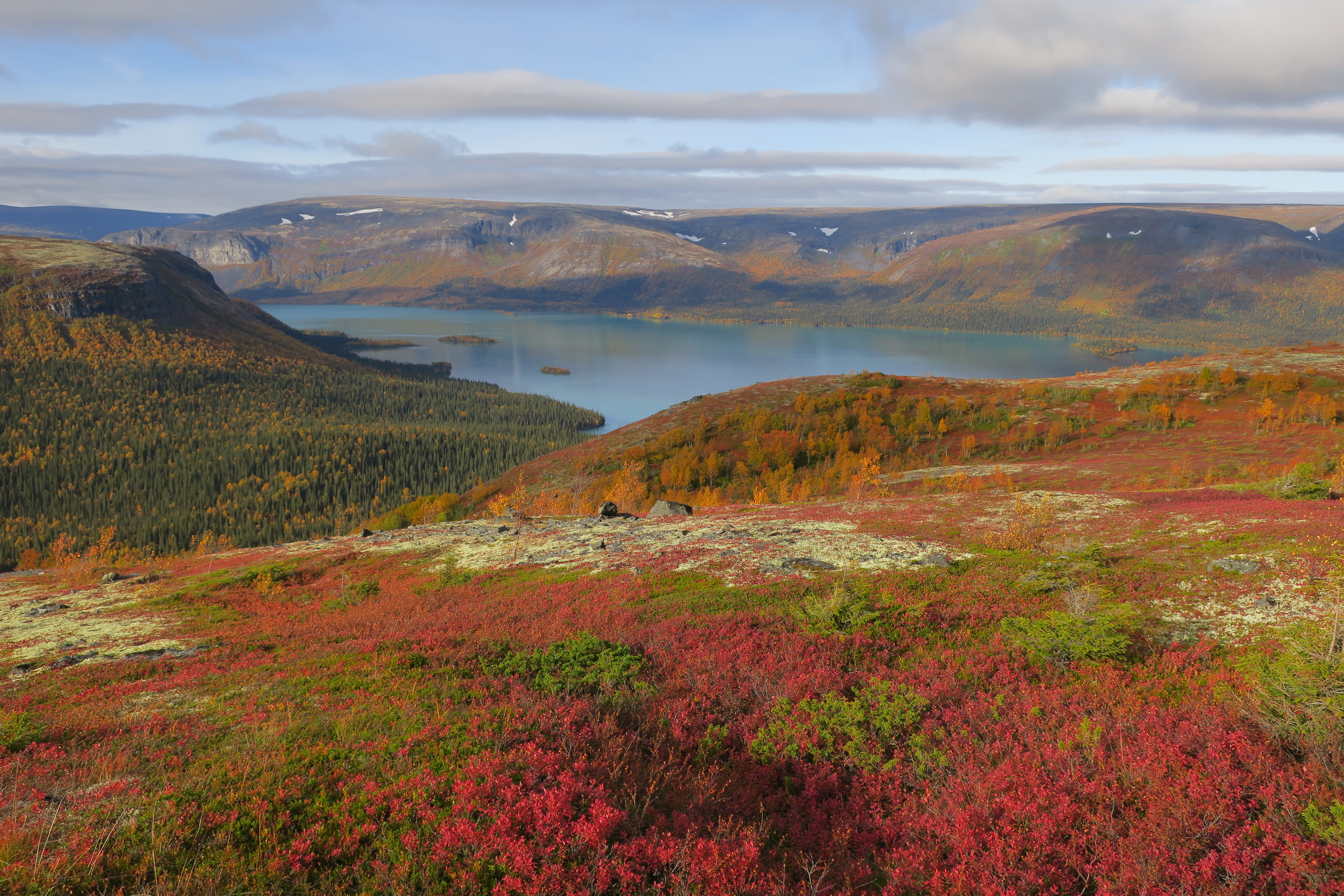
Lake Seydozero seen from the Mount Ninchurt

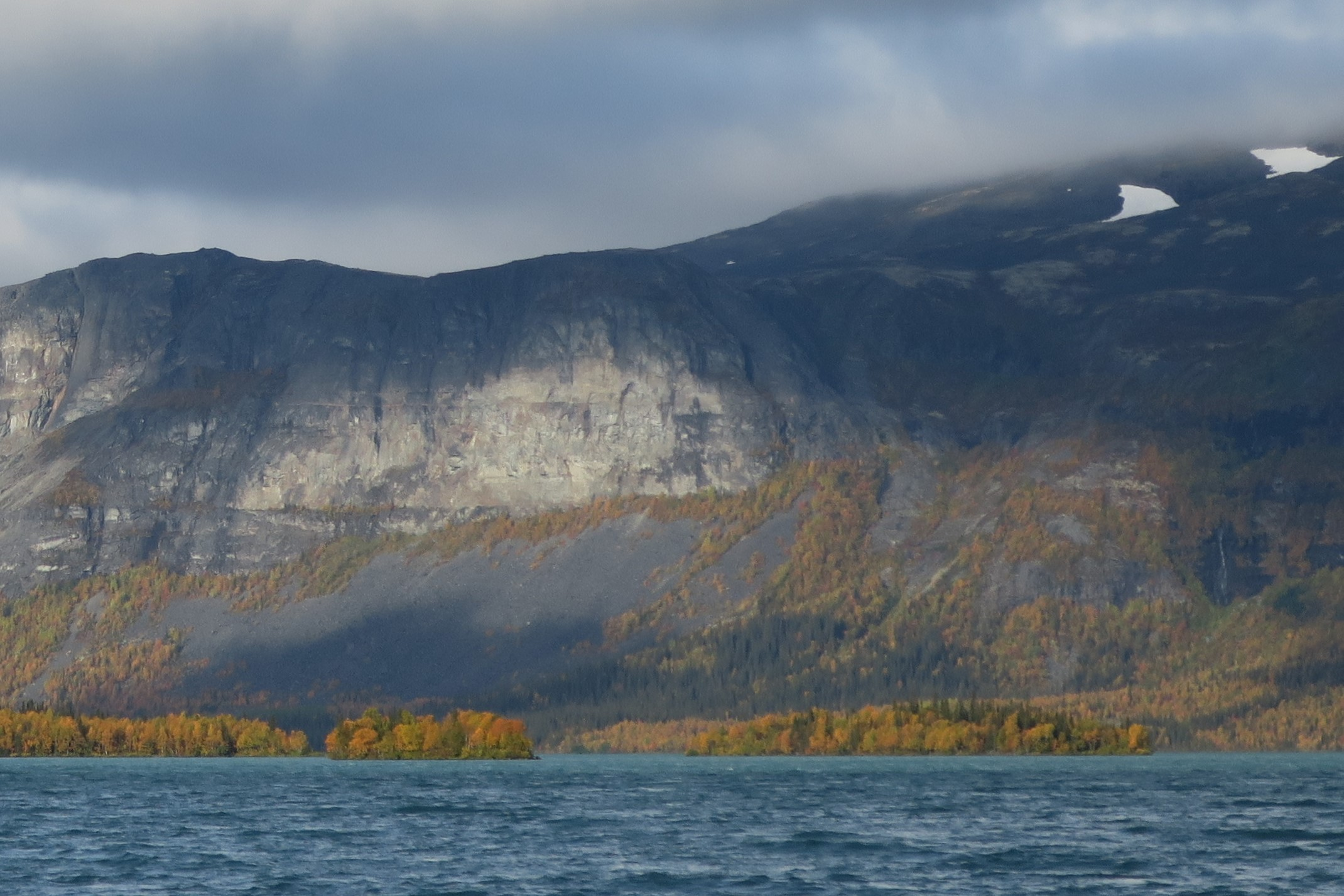
Kuiva, revered human-shaped silhouette on a cliff

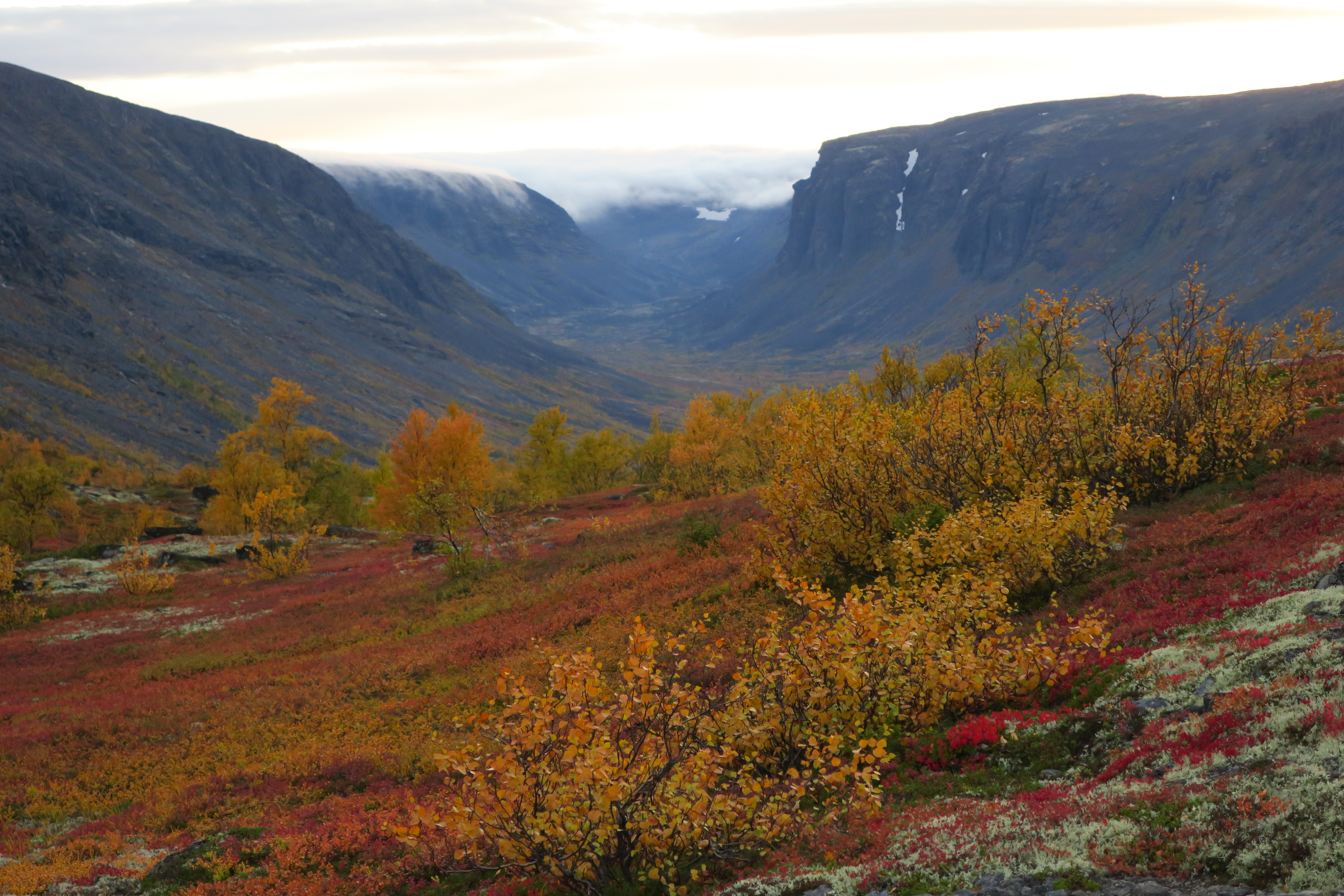
Chivruay River Valley near Saydozero Lake

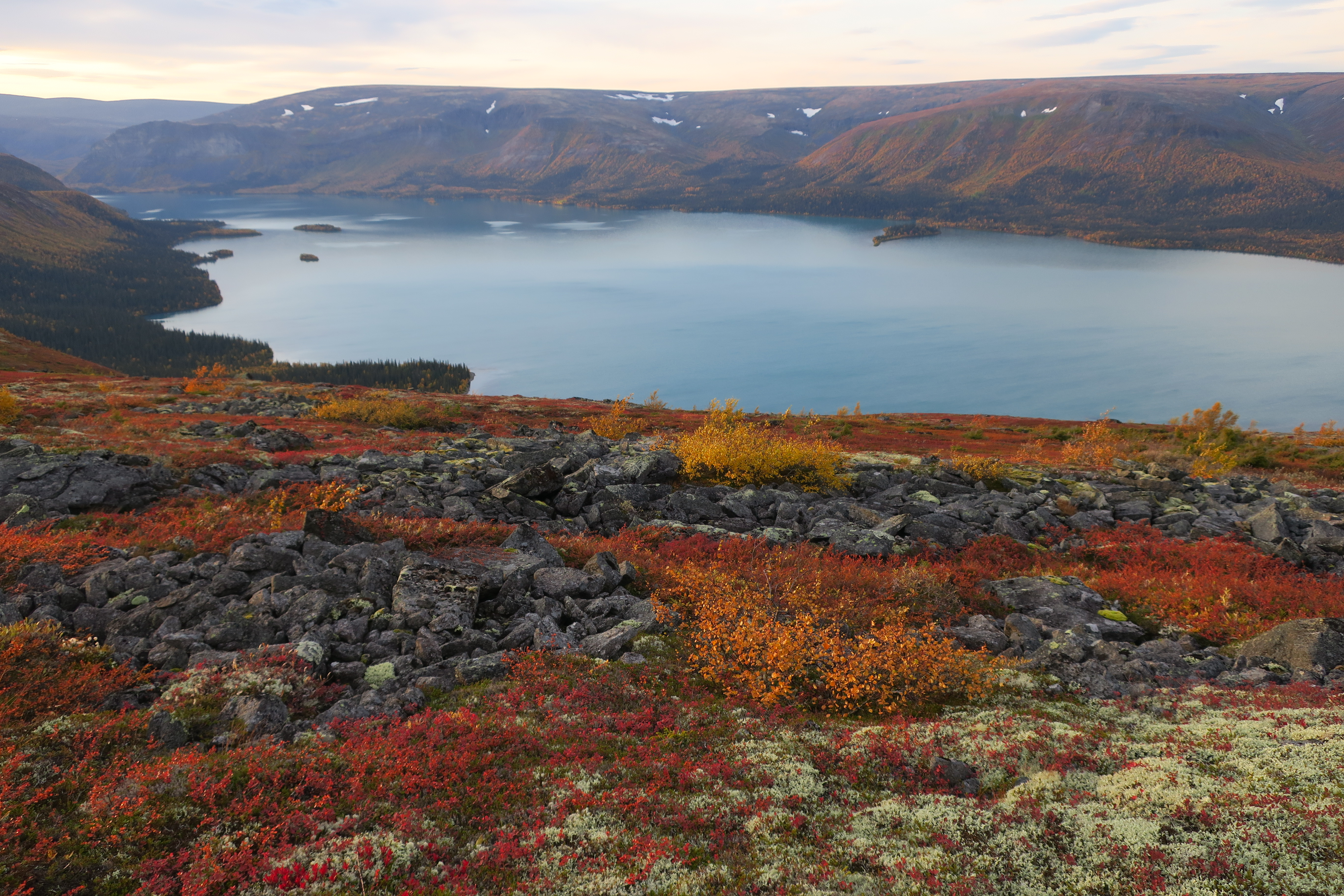
Lake Seydozero in fall colors
