= Davidsmithite =

Tectosilicate mineral in the feldspathoid group

General
- Category: Tectosilicate minerals
- Group: Feldspathoid group
- Formula: (Ca,◻)_{2}Na_{6}Al_{8}Si_{8}O_{32}
- IMA symbol: Dvs
- Strunz classification: 9.FA.05
- Crystal system: Hexagonal
- Unit cell: a = 9.982(1) Å; c = 8.364(2) Å; V = 732.74 Å^{3}; Z=1

Identification
- Color: Transparent, Colorless
- Crystal habit: Irregular
- Twinning: None
- Cleavage: None
- Fracture: N/A
- Mohs scale hardness: 5.5
- Luster: Vitreous, Greasy
- Streak: White
- Density: 2.597g cm^{−3}
- Optical properties: Uniaxial Negative
- Birefringence: low
- Ultraviolet fluorescence: None

Davidsmithite is a Ca-bearing nepheline-group mineral with the formula (Ca,◻)_{2}Na_{6}Al_{8}Si_{8}O_{32}, with the "◻" being a vacancy in the formula. It is a feldspathoid mineral that occurs as a rock forming in the Liset eclogite pod (Norwegian Caledonides). Commonly found alongside lisetite, davidsmithite is found overgrowing this other mineral in corona textures.

== Name ==
Davidsmithite is named after David Christopher Smith, who has made significant contributions to the world of mineralogy and petrology. As Emeritus professor at the Muséum National d’Histoire Naturelle (MNHN) in Paris, France, he has discovered minerals like nyböite, lisetite, taramite and ferro-taramite, in Norway. His contributions towards petrology include the recognition of the sub-discipline of Ultra High Pressure Metamorphism (UHPM).

== Occurrence ==
Davidsmithite was discovered at the Liset eclogite pod, Liset, Selje, Western Gneiss Region, Vestlandet, Norway. It is found near the closely related Lisetite, which has a similar composition (CaNa_{2}Al_{4}Si_{4}O_{16}) and structure, being a tectosilicate. It has also been reported in melted rocks (clinkers and paralavas) in Eastern Mongolia.

== Properties ==
Davidsmithite occurs as anhedral and sometimes skeletal or lath-like crystals ranging between 80 and 100μm in length and about 30μm wide. It is indistinguishable to surrounding minerals such as quartz, plagioclase and lisetite. The optical properties of Davidsmithite show it to be colorless to pale yellow in thin sections. It is optically uniaxial negative. It has a low birefringence, which is similar to lisetite and plagioclase. This low birefringence is the main way to distinguish it, otherwise it can only be confirmed by EMP (electron microprobe) and SEM (scanning electron microscope).

== X-ray crystallography ==
Davidsmithite is in the hexagonal crystal system with the space group of P6_{3}. The unit cell was found using x-ray-powder diffraction. The unit cell dimensions are as follows: a = 9.982(1) Å, c = 8.364(2) Å, V = 721.74 Å^{3}, and Z = 1. No polarization or Lorentz corrections were applied.

== Chemical composition ==
| Oxide | Weight % |
|---|---|
| CaO | 3.16 |
| K_{2}O | 0.69 |
| Na_{2}O | 16.89 |
| Al_{2}O_{3} | 35.52 |
| Fe_{2}O_{3} | 0.13 |
| SiO_{2} | 43.63 |
| MgO | 0.02 |
| MnO | 0.04 |
| NiO | 0.01 |
| TiO_{2} | 0.04 |
