= Drysdallite =

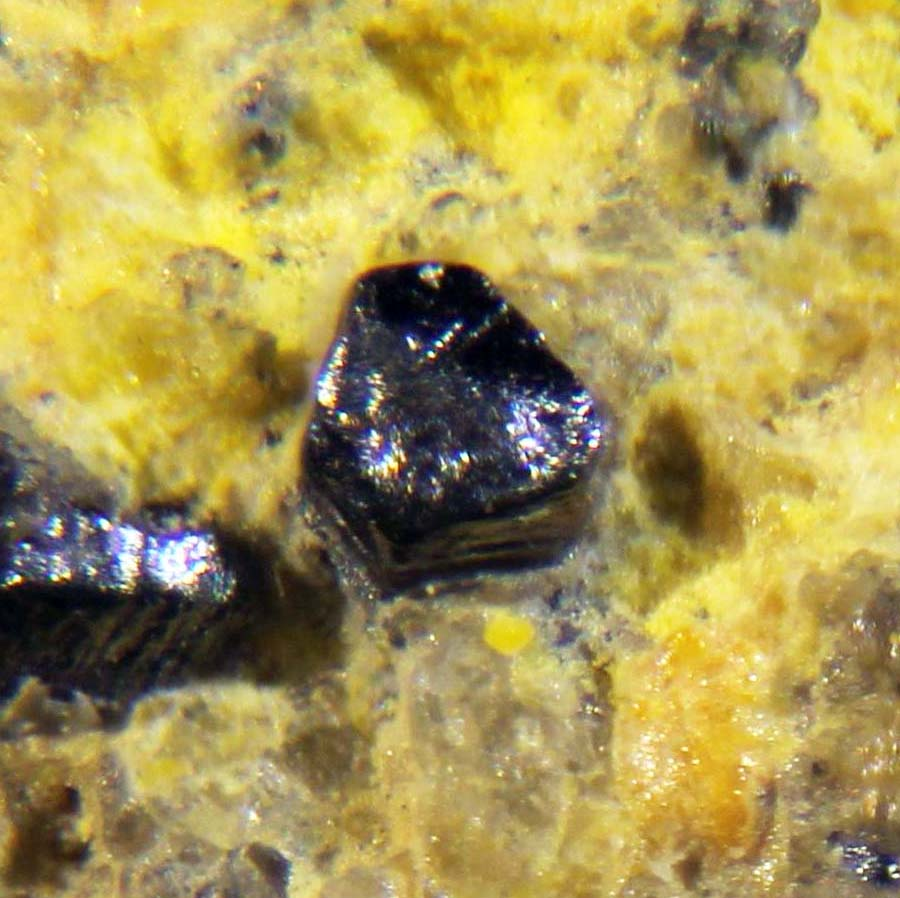

General
- Category: Minerals
- Formula: MoSe1.5S0.5
- IMA symbol: Dry
- Strunz classification: 2/D.25-30
- Dana classification: 1.12.10.2
- Crystal system: Hexagonal - Dihexagonal Dipyramidal
- Space group: P6_{3}/mmc (No. 194)
- Unit cell: 120.94 Å³ (Calculated from Unit Cell)

Identification
- Formula mass: 230.41 gm
- Colour: Grayish-black
- Cleavage: Perfect
- Tenacity: Waxy, pliable, difficult to pulverise
- Mohs scale hardness: 2
- Luster: Metallic
- Streak: Brown-black
- Specific gravity: 6.248 (Calculated)
- Density: 6.248 g/cm3 (Calculated)
- Pleochroism: Strong, white to very pale grey, to pinkish grey

Drysdallite is a rare molybdenum selenium sulfide mineral with formula Mo(Se,S)_{2}. It crystallizes in the hexagonal system as small pyramidal crystals or in cleavable masses. It is an opaque metallic mineral with a Mohs hardness of 1 to 1.5 and a specific gravity of 6.25. Like molybdenite it is pliable with perfect cleavage.

It was first described in 1973 for an occurrence in an oxidized uranium deposit near Solwezi, Zambia. It was named for Alan Roy Drysdall, the director of the Zambian geological survey.
