= Tuperssuatsiaite =

Phyllosilicate mineral in the palygorskite group

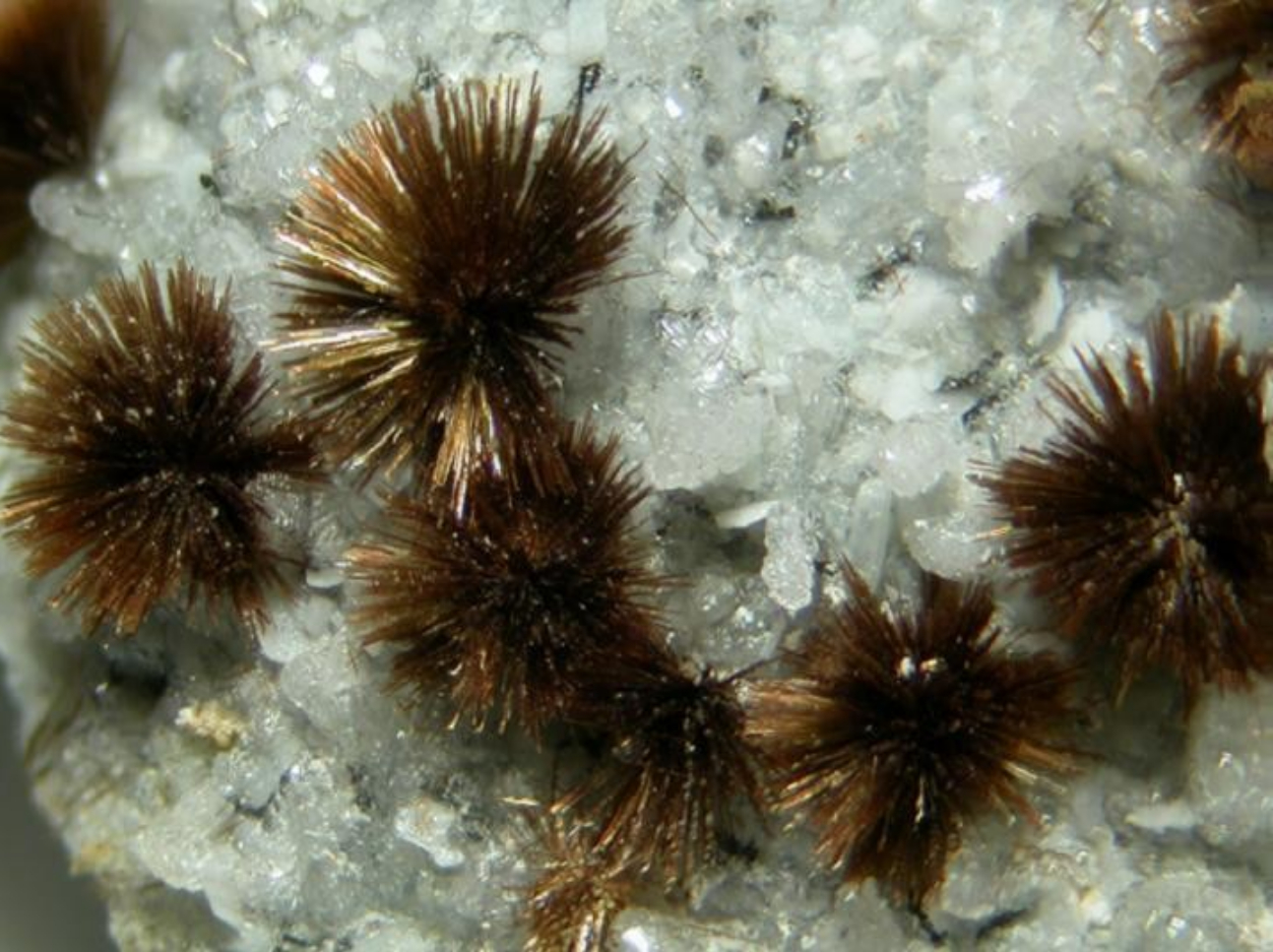
- Tuperssuatsiaite from the Aris Quarries, Namibia. Field of view 5 mm.

General
- Category: Phyllosilicate minerals
- Group: Palygorskite group
- Formula: NaFe^{3+}_{3}Si_{8}O_{20}(OH)_{2}·H_{2}O
- IMA symbol: Tup
- Strunz classification: 9.EE.20
- Dana classification: 74.3.1a.2
- Crystal system: Monoclinic
- Crystal class: Prismatic (2/m) (same H-M symbol)
- Space group: C2/m
- Unit cell: a = 13.72 Å, b = 18 Å c = 4.82 Å; β = 104.28°; Z = 2

Identification
- Formula mass: 818.31 g/mol
- Color: Dark to light red-brown
- Crystal habit: Fan-shaped aggregates, rosettes or fibers
- Twinning: Common
- Cleavage: Good on {100}
- Fracture: Uneven to conchoidal
- Tenacity: Brittle
- Mohs scale hardness: Not determined
- Luster: Vitreous
- Streak: Brownish yellow
- Diaphaneity: Transparent
- Specific gravity: 2.465
- Optical properties: Biaxial (+)
- Refractive index: n_{α} = 1.539, n_{β} = 1.560, n_{γ} = 1.595
- Birefringence: δ = 0.056
- Pleochroism: Colorless to yellowish brown or reddish brown
- 2V angle: Measured: 103° to 103°, Calculated: 78°
- Other characteristics: Neither radioactive nor fluorescent

Tuperssuatsiaite is a rare clay mineral found in Greenland, Namibia and Brazil. It is a hydrated phyllosilicate (sheet silicate) of sodium and iron.

== Discovery ==
Tuperssuatsiaite was first found by Karup-Moller and Petersen in Greenland, in 1984, and given the International Mineralogical Association designation IMA1984-002. It was later named after the type locality, Tuperssuatsiat Bay, Ilimaussaq, Greenland. In 1992 Karup-Moller and Petersen, together with von Knorring and Leonardsen, found more specimens from a second find in the Aris Quarry in Namibia, that allowed a better definition of the properties and composition of the mineral. Later still, in 2005, more material was found by a group of researchers from the University of São Paulo at the Bortolan Quarry, Pocos de Caldas, Brazil, and although the crystals were small, accurate determinations were made of their physical and optical properties, which differed slightly from those of the specimens from Greenland and Namibia.

== Mineral group ==
Tuperssuatsiaite is a member of the palygorskite-sepiolite group, palygorskite subgroup.
Subgroup members (formulae according to the IMA):

- palygorskite (Mg,Al)_{2}Si_{4}O_{10}(OH)·4H_{2}O
- tuperssuatsiaite NaFe^{3+}_{3}Si_{8}O_{20}(OH)_{2}·4H_{2}O
- yofortierite Mn^{2+}_{5}Si_{8}O_{20}(OH)_{2}᛫8–9H_{2}O

Iron occurs both in the ferric state Fe^{3+} and the ferrous state Fe^{2+}. The formula for tuperssuatsiaite contains only ferric iron, and the Greenland material is consistent with this. Analysis of the Namibian material, however, shows that part of the iron is in the ferrous state. Manganese is also present as a substitute for iron, and a zinc-rich material has been reported from Greenland.

== Structure ==
The mineral belongs to the monoclinic crystal class 2/m, meaning that it has a twofold axis of rotational symmetry perpendicular to a mirror plane. At one time it was thought that the material from Namibia might belong to the monoclinic class 2, without the mirror plane, but a more recent study gives it as 2/m, the same as the material from Greenland.

The space group is B2/m, meaning that in the unit cell there is one structural unit at each vertex, and one in the centre of each B face. The palygorskite-sepiolite minerals are clay minerals with a layered structure. In tuperssuatsiaite ribbons of SiO_{4} tetrahedra, similar to those in the amphibole structure, are aligned parallel to the c crystal axis, and they link to form layers parallel to the plane containing the a and b axes. The spacing between the layers, in the c direction, is about 5 Å, which is typical for minerals with an amphibole-type structure, due to the repeat distance along the chains of tetrahedra. Channels occur that could be occupied by H_{2}O as in palygorskite.

== Unit cell ==
There are two formula units per unit cell (Z = 2), and the cell dimensions vary slightly for specimens from different locations; for all specimens, to the nearest Å, a = 14 Å, b = 18 Å and c = 5 Å, and the angle β = 103° to 105°.

For the three main localities the reported values are:

- a = 13.729(30) Å, b : 18.000(10) Å, c =4.828(30) Å, β = 104.28(10)° (Greenland)
- a = 13.92(7) Å, b = 17.73(5) Å, c = 5.30(3) Å, β = 104.78(l)° (Namibia)
- a = 13.945 to 14.034 Å, b = 17.841 to 17.93 Å, c = 5.265 to 5.277 Å, β = 103.35 to 103.67° (Brazil)

== Appearance ==
Tuperssuatsiaite occurs as fan-shaped aggregates up to several centimeters across, as rosettes and as fibers elongated parallel to the c axis. It is red-brown in reflected light, and colorless to light yellowish brown in transmitted light, with a brownish yellow streak. Crystals are transparent with a bright vitreous luster, but aggregates may be dull and translucent.

== Optical properties ==
The mineral is biaxial (+), with refractive indices Nx ~ 1.54, Ny ~ 1.56 and Nz ~ 1.58 to 1.60.

For the three main localities the reported values are:

- Nx = 1.54, Ny = 1.56, Nz = 1.58 (Greenland)
- Nx = 1.5388(5), Ny = 1.5596(5) Nz = 1.595( l) (Namibia)
- Nx = 1.548 to 1.556, Ny = 1.560 to 1.565, Nz = 1.648 to 1.662 (Brazil)

It is mildly pleochroic, with X colorless, Y colorless to pale brown or green and Z generally reddish brown. No fluorescence has been observed.

== Physical properties ==
Cleavage is good on a plane containing the b and c crystal axes, parallel to the layers within the structure, and twinning is common.

Fracture is uneven to conchoidal (shell-like) and the mineral is brittle; it is quite light, with specific gravity 2.465, which is similar to that of quartz.

== Type locality ==
The type locality is Tuperssuatsiat Bay, Tunugdliarfik Firth (Eriksfjord), Ilimaussaq complex, Narsaq, Kitaa (West Greenland) Province, Greenland, and type material is conserved at the University of Copenhagen, Copenhagen, Denmark, and at the National Museum of Natural History, Washington DC, US, reference number 162402.

== Occurrence and associations ==
- Greenland: The mineral occurs at the type locality in the Ilimaussaq intrusive complex, Greenland, as a cavity filling in late-stage, low-temperature veins with adularia, natrolite and aegirine, and in late natrolite-albite bodies.
- Namibia: It occurs in miarolitic cavities in the Aris phonolite, Windhoek, Namibia, associated with microcline, aegirine, natrolite, eudialyte, bastnasite, makatite, villiaumite, titanite, apophyllite, analcime and aragonite. Aris is a phonolite quarry about 20 km south of Windhoek, Namibia, which is mined for road gravel. Some zones of the phonolite rock contain numerous small cavities a few centimeters in diameter, with well-formed, microscopic crystals of various minerals, including the abundant occurrence of tuperssuatsiaite.
- Brazil: Tuperssuatsiaite occurs in the abandoned Bortolan tinguite quarry, Pocos de Caldas, Minas Gerais, Brazil. Tinguite is a dark green intrusive phonolite composed essentially of alkali feldspar, nepheline and aegirine. The tuperssuatsiaite occurs in and near miarolitic cavities in the tinguite, as fibers and needles to 4 micrometers thick and 3 mm wide, isolated or more commonly as rosettes, tufts and shapeless aggregates, often associated with pectolite.
- Other localities: Tuperssuatsiaite has also been reported from Quebec, Canada and the Lovozero Massif, Russia.
