= Labyrinthite =

Mineral of the eudialyte group

General
- Category: Silicate mineral, cyclosilicate
- Formula: (Na,K,Sr)_{35}Ca_{12}Fe_{3}Zr_{6}TiSi_{51}O_{144}(O,OH,H_{2}O)_{9}Cl_{3}
- IMA symbol: Lby
- Crystal system: Trigonal
- Crystal class: Pyramidal (3) (same H-M symbol)
- Space group: R3
- Unit cell: a = 14.24, c = 60.73 [Å] (approximated); Z = 3

Identification
- Color: Pink
- Crystal habit: anhedral grains
- Cleavage: None
- Fracture: Conchoidal
- Tenacity: Brittle
- Mohs scale hardness: 5–6
- Luster: Vitreous
- Streak: White
- Diaphaneity: Transparent
- Density: 2.88 g/cm^{3} (measured)
- Optical properties: Uniaxial (+)
- Refractive index: n_{0} = 1.60, n_{e} = 1.60 (approximated)
- Pleochroism: None
- Alters to: surface alteration to lovozerite, zirsinalite and thermonatrite

Labyrinthite is a very rare mineral of the eudialyte group. When compared to other species in the group, its structure is extremely complex – with over 100 sites and about 800 cations and anions – hence its name, with its complexity expressed in its chemical formula (Na,K,Sr)_{35}Ca_{12}Fe_{3}Zr_{6}TiSi_{51}O_{144}(O,OH,H_{2}O)_{9}Cl_{3}. The formula is simplified as it does not show the presence of cyclic silicate groups. Complexity of the structure results in symmetry lowering (likely due to ordering of cations) from the typical centrosymmetrical group to R3 space group. Other eudialyte-group representatives with such symmetry lowering include aqualite, oneillite, raslakite, voronkovite. Labyrinthite is the second dual-nature (both zircono- and titanosilicate) representative of the group after dualite and third with essential titanium after dualite and alluaivite.

== Occurrence and association ==
Labyrinthite was discovered in hyperagpaitic (ultra-alkaline) pegmatite at Mt. Nyorkpakhk, Khibiny massif, Kola Peninsula, Russia, where it represents a late-stage mineral. It coexists with aegirine, alkaline amphibole, lamprophyllite, lomonosovite, potassium feldspar, pectolite, sodalite, and villiaumite.

== Notes on chemistry ==
Beside that given in the formula, other elements substituting the main ones in labyrinthite are manganese, fluorine, and cerium.

== Notes on crystal structure ==
Labyrinthite is two-modular – its structure contains alluaivite-like and eudialyte-like module. The framework of labyrinthite is 24-layered. It also characterize in doubled c unit cell parameter.
