= Dualite =

Mineral of the eudialyte group

General
- Category: Silicate mineral, cyclosilicate
- Formula: Na_{30}(Ca,Na,Ce,Sr)_{12}(Na,Mn,Fe,Ti)_{6}Zr_{3}Ti_{3}MnSi_{51}O_{144}(OH,H_{2}O,Cl)_{9}
- IMA symbol: Dua
- Strunz classification: 9.CO.10
- Dana classification: 64.1b.1.4
- Crystal system: Trigonal
- Crystal class: Ditrigonal pyramidal (3m); H-M symbol: (3m)
- Space group: R3m
- Unit cell: a = 14.15, c = 60.72 [Å] (approximated); Z = 3

Identification
- Color: Yellow
- Crystal habit: Anhedral grains
- Cleavage: None
- Fracture: Conchoidal
- Tenacity: Brittle
- Mohs scale hardness: 5
- Luster: Vitreous
- Streak: White
- Diaphaneity: Transparent or translucent
- Density: 2.84 (measured), 2.81 (calculated; approximated)
- Optical properties: Uniaxial (+)
- Refractive index: nω = 1.61, nε = 1.61 (approximated)
- Pleochroism: None
- Ultraviolet fluorescence: No

Dualite is a very rare and complex mineral of the eudialyte group, its complexity being expressed in its formula Na_{30}(Ca,Na,Ce,Sr)_{12}(Na,Mn,Fe,Ti)_{6}Zr_{3}Ti_{3}MnSi_{51}O_{144}(OH,H_{2}O,Cl)_{9}. The formula is simplified as it does not show the presence of cyclic silicate groups. The name of the mineral comes from its dual nature: zircono- and titanosilicate at once. Dualite has two modules in its structure: alluaivite one and eudialyte one. After alluaivite and labyrinthite it stands for third representative of the eudialyte group with essential titanium.

== Occurrence and association ==
Dualite was found in peralkaline pegmatoid rock at Mt Alluaiv, Lovozero massif, Kola Peninsula Russia. It associates with aegirine, alkaline amphibole, cancrinite, eudialyte, K-Na feldspar, lamprophyllite, lomonosovite, lovozerite, nepheline, sodalite, sphalerite, villiaumite, and vuonnemite.

== Notes on chemistry ==
Dualite admixtures not mentioned in the formula are especially that of niobium, with lesser amount of aluminium, barium, potassium, neodymium and lanthanum. Dualite is chemically similar to labyrinthite and rastsvetaevite.

== Notes on crystal structure ==
Dualite has doubled c value when compared to ordinary eudialyte. Its structural framework has 24 layers.
