= Alluaivite =

Cyclosilicate mineral

General
- Category: Silicate mineral, Cyclosilicate
- Formula: Na_{19}(Ca,Mn)_{6}(Ti,Nb)_{3}Si_{26}O_{74}Cl·2H_{2}O
- IMA symbol: Aav
- Strunz classification: 9.CO.10 (10 ed); 8/E.25-40 (8 ed)
- Dana classification: 64.1b.1.1
- Crystal system: Trigonal
- Crystal class: Hexagonal scalenohedral (3̅m); H-M symbol: (3̅ 2/m)
- Space group: R3̅m
- Unit cell: a = 14.04, c = 60.6 [Å]; Z = 6

Identification
- Color: Colorless to weak brownish pink
- Crystal habit: irregular accumulations
- Cleavage: None
- Fracture: Conchoidal
- Tenacity: Brittle
- Mohs scale hardness: 5–6
- Luster: Vitreous
- Streak: White
- Diaphaneity: Transparent
- Density: 2.76 (measured)
- Optical properties: Uniaxial (+)
- Refractive index: nω = 1.62, nε = 1.63 (approximated)
- Pleochroism: Colorless to pink (W), pink (E)
- Ultraviolet fluorescence: Orange-red
- Common impurities: Sr, REE, K, Ba, Zr

Alluaivite is a rare mineral of the eudialyte group, with complex formula written as Na_{19}(Ca,Mn)_{6}(Ti,Nb)_{3}Si_{26}O_{74}Cl·2H_{2}O. It is unique among the eudialyte group as the only titanosilicate (other representatives of the group are usually zirconosilicates). The two dual-nature minerals of the group, being both titano- and zirconosilicates, are labyrinthite and dualite. They both contain alluaivite module in their structures. Alluaivite is named after Mt. Alluaiv in Lovozero Tundry massif, Kola Peninsula, Russia, where it is found in ultra-agpaitic, hyperalkaline pegmatites.

== Notes on chemistry ==
Alluaivite contains relatively high amounts of admixing strontium, cerium, potassium, and barium, with lesser amounts of substituting lanthanum and zirconium.

== Occurrence and association ==
Alluaivite was found in ultra-agpaitic (highly alkaline) pegmatites on Mt. Alluaiv, Lovozero massif, Kola Peninsula, Russia – hence its name. Associating minerals are aegirine, arfvedsonite, eudialyte, nepheline, potassic feldspar, and sodalite.
