= Raslakite =

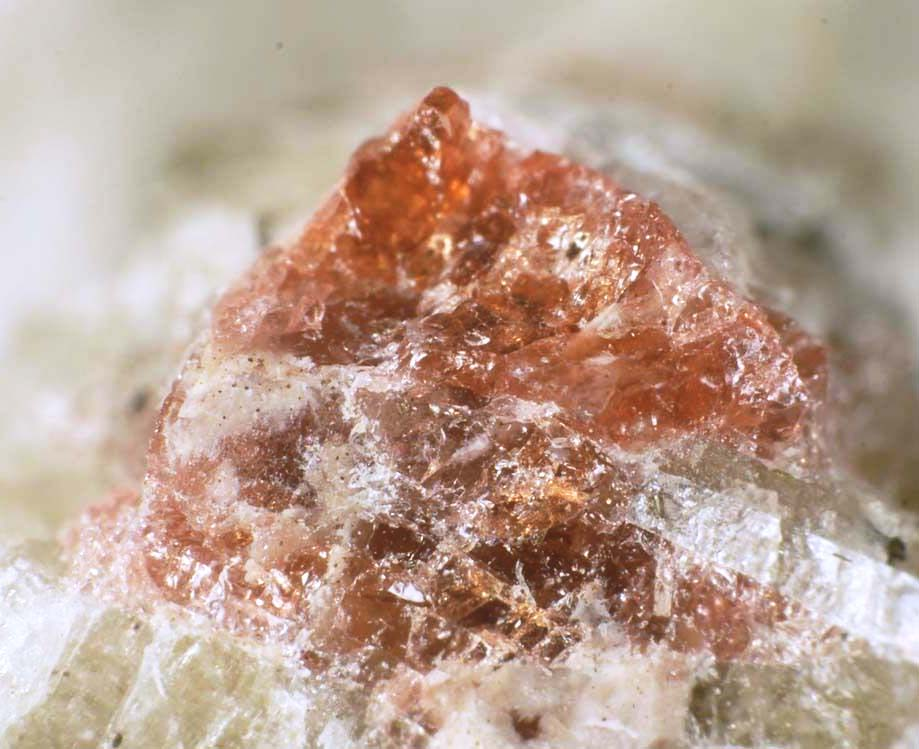
- Red glassy raslakite in nepheline-syenite from the type locality: Karnasurt Mountain, Lovozero Massif, Northern Region, Russian Federation.

General
- Category: Silicate mineral
- Formula: Na_{15}Ca_{3}Fe_{3}(Na,Zr)_{3}Zr_{3}(Si,Nb)(Si_{25}O_{73})(OH,H_{2}O)_{3}(Cl,OH) (original form)
- IMA symbol: Rsk
- Strunz classification: 9.CO.10
- Crystal system: Trigonal
- Crystal class: Pyramidal (3); H-M symbol: (3)
- Space group: R3
- Unit cell: a = 14.23, c = 30.02 [Å]; Z = 3

Identification
- Color: Brownish-red
- Crystal habit: Grains
- Cleavage: Imperfect
- Fracture: Conchoidal
- Tenacity: Brittle
- Mohs scale hardness: 5
- Luster: Vitreous
- Streak: White
- Diaphaneity: Transparent
- Specific gravity: 2.95 (measured)
- Optical properties: Uniaxial
- Refractive index: nω = 1.61, nε = 1.61 (approximated)

Raslakite is a rare mineral of the eudialyte group with the chemical formula Na_{15}Ca_{3}Fe_{3}(Na,Zr)_{3}Zr_{3}(Si,Nb)SiO(Si_{9}O_{27})_{2}(Si_{3}O_{9})_{2}(OH,H_{2}O)_{3}(Cl,OH). This formula is based on the original one, and is extended to show the presence of cyclic silicate groups. The additional silicon and oxygen shown in separation from the cyclic groups (in parentheses) are in fact connected with two 9-fold rings. The mineral has lowered symmetry (space group R3, instead of more specific for the group R3m one), similarly to some other eudialyte-group members: aqualite, labyrinthite, oneillite and voronkovite. The specific feature of raslakite is, among others, the presence of sodium and zirconium at the M2 site. Raslakite was named after Raslak Cirques located nearby the type locality.

== Occurrence and association ==
Raslakite was discovered, together with ikranite, in peralkaline pegmatites of the Mt. Karnasurt, Lovozero massif, Kola Peninsula, Russia. Raslakite is associated with aegirine, fluorcaphite, kazakovite, lamprophyllite, microcline, nepheline, and terskite.

== Notes on chemistry ==
Beside main elements given in the formula, raslakite contains some potassium, strontium, manganese, magnesium, cerium, titanium, and aluminium, with minor amounts of lanthanum and hafnium.

== Notes on crystal structure ==
The M(1) site in raslakite is split into two sub-sites, where Fe and Ca are located. The M(2) site is occupied by sodium, manganese (both with coordination number 5), and zirconium (tetrahedral coordination).
