= Normandite =

Sorosilicate mineral

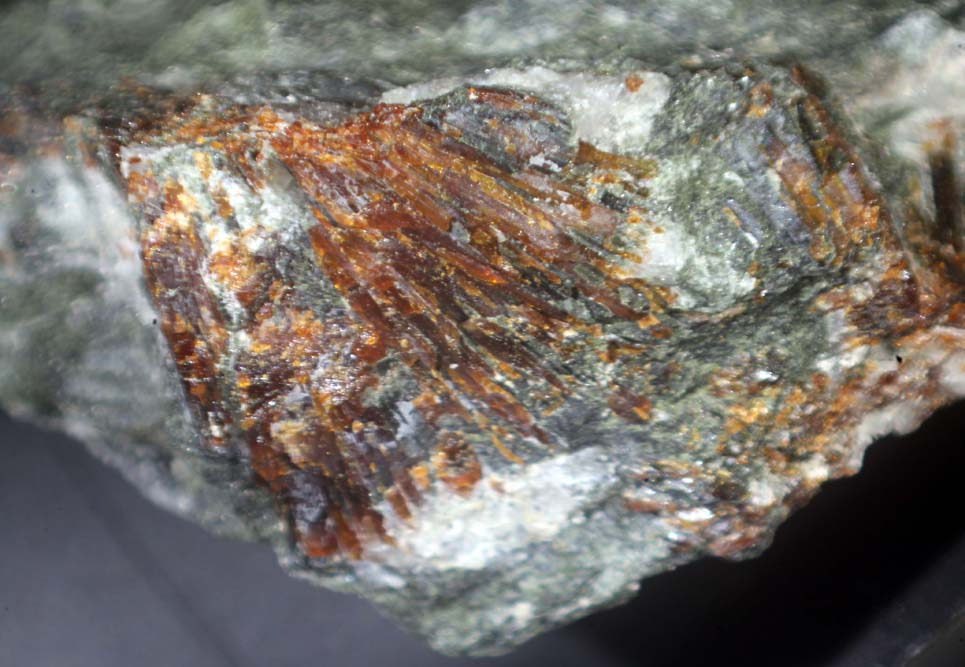

General
- Category: Minerals
- Formula: NaCa(Mn^{2+},Fe^{2+})(Ti,Nb,Zr)Si_{2}O_{7}(O,F)_{2}
- IMA symbol: Nmd
- Crystal system: Monoclinic
- Space group: P2_{1}/a (no. 14)

Identification
- Mohs scale hardness: 5 - 6
- Specific gravity: 3.48 - 3.5

Normandite is a brittle orange brown sorosilicate mineral discovered in 1997 by Charles Normand (born 1963), of Montreal. Normandite occurs in Khibiny Massif, Kola, Russia; in Poudrette quarry, Mont-Saint-Hilaire, Quebec (type locality) and Tenerife, Canary Islands. It is found in nepheline syenite and in miarolitic cavities in nepheline syenite, associated with nepheline, albite, microcline, aegirine, natrolite, catapleiite, kupletskite, eudialyte, cancrinite, villiaumite, rinkite, and donnayite-(Y).

Normandite has a chemical formula of NaCa(Mn^{2+},Fe^{2+})(Ti,Nb,Zr)Si_{2}O_{7}(O,F)_{2}. It crystallizes in the monoclinic-prismatic crystal system. It occurs as transparent to translucent orange-brown aggregates of subparallel acicular crystals up to 10 mm in length, and as patches of yellow, fibrous crystals. It has a white to very pale yellow streak and vitreous luster. It is brittle, with distinct {100} and {001} cleavages, and a conchoidal fracture. It has a specific gravity of 3.48 to 3.5, a Mohs hardness of 5 to 6 and refractive index values of nα=1.743, nβ=1.785 and nγ=1.810. It is named after Charles Normand (born 1963), Canadian geologist.
