= Voronkovite =

General
- Category: Silicate mineral, Cyclosilicate
- Formula: Na_{15}(Na,Ca,Ce)_{3}(Mn,Ca)_{3}Fe_{3}Zr_{3}Si_{26}O_{72}(OH,O)_{4}Cl·H_{2}O (original form)
- IMA symbol: Vrk
- Strunz classification: 9.CO.10
- Crystal system: Trigonal
- Crystal class: Pyramidal (3); H-M symbol: (3)
- Space group: R3
- Unit cell: a = 14.21, c = 30.27 [Å]; Z = 3

Identification
- Color: Light brown
- Crystal habit: Rounded crystals
- Fracture: Conchoidal
- Tenacity: Brittle
- Mohs scale hardness: 5
- Luster: Vitreous
- Streak: White
- Diaphaneity: Transparent
- Density: 2.95 g/cm^{3} (calculated)
- Optical properties: Uniaxial (+)
- Pleochroism: Lemon yellow (X), brownish pink (Y)

Voronkovite is a very rare mineral of the eudialyte group with the chemical formula Na_{15}(Na,Ca,Ce)_{3}(Mn,Ca)_{3}Fe_{3}Zr_{3}Si_{2}Si_{24}O_{72}(OH,O)_{4}Cl·H_{2}O. The formula is based on the simplified original one; it does not show the presence of cyclic silicate groups, but two M3- and M4-site silicon atoms are shown separately (basing on the nomenclature of the eudialyte group). Voronkovite has lowered symmetry (space group R3, instead of more specific for the group R3m one), similarly to some other eudialyte-group members: aqualite, labyrinthite, oneillite and raslakite. The specific feature of voronkovite is, among others, strong enrichment in sodium.

== Occurrence and association ==
Voronkovite comes from an ultra-alkaline pegmatite of Mt. Alluaiv, Lovozero Massif, Kola Peninsula, Russia. It occurs with aegirine, lomonosovite, manganoneptunite, microcline, nepheline, shkatulkalite, sodalite, terskite, sphalerite and vuonnemite.

== Notes on chemistry ==
Voronkovite has additional impurities, not given in the formula. They include strontium, fluorine, potassium, lanthanum, neodymium (at the Mn site), niobium, and minor hafnium and aluminium.
