= Lorenzenite =

Sodium titanium silicate mineral

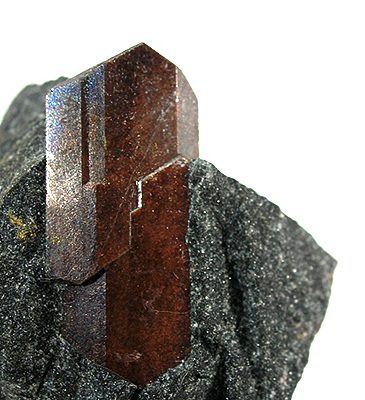
- Doubly terminated crystal of Lorenzenite, 2.5 cm tip to tip, from Lovozero Massif, Kola Peninsula, Russia

General
- Category: Silicate mineral
- Formula: Na_{2}Ti_{2}[O_{3}|Si_{2}O_{6}]
- IMA symbol: Lrz
- Strunz classification: 9.DB.10
- Crystal system: Orthorhombic
- Crystal class: Dipyramidal (mmm); H–M Symbol: (2/m 2/m 2/m)
- Space group: Pbcn
- Unit cell: a = 8.71, b = 5.23 c = 14.48 [Å]; Z = 4

Identification
- Color: Pale purple-brown, pale pink to mauve, brown to black
- Crystal habit: Equant, bladed, prismatic, to needlelike crystals; fibrous, felted, lamellar aggregates
- Cleavage: Distinct/good on {010}
- Fracture: Irregular/uneven
- Mohs scale hardness: 6
- Luster: Adamantine, vitreous, sub-metallic, dull
- Streak: White to pale brown
- Diaphaneity: Transparent, opaque
- Specific gravity: 3.42 – 3.45
- Optical properties: Biaxial (−)
- Refractive index: n_{α} = 1.910 – 1.950 n_{β} = 2.010 – 2.040 n_{γ} = 2.030 – 2.060
- Birefringence: δ = 0.120
- Pleochroism: Weak
- 2V angle: Measured: 38° to 41°
- Ultraviolet fluorescence: Pale yellow to dull green under SW UV

Lorenzenite is a rare sodium titanium silicate mineral with the formula Na_{2}Ti_{2}Si_{2}O_{9} It is an orthorhombic mineral, variously found as colorless, grey, pinkish, or brown crystals.

It was first identified in 1897 in rock samples from Narsarsuk, Greenland. In 1947 it was discovered to be the same as the mineral ramsayite (now a synonym of lorenzenite), discovered in the 1920s in the Kola Peninsula of Russia. It is also found in northern Canada.

It occurs in nepheline syenites and pegmatites in association with aegirine, nepheline, microcline, arfvedsonite, elpidite, loparite, eudialyte, astrophyllite, mangan-neptunite, lavenite, rinkite, apatite, titanite and ilmenite.

It was named in honor of Danish mineralogist Johannes Theodor Lorenzen (1855–1884).
