= Serandite =

Mineral

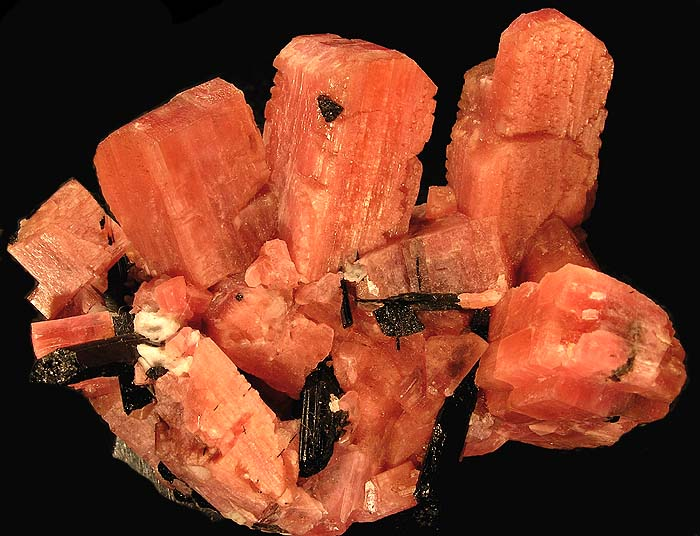
- Serandite from Mont Saint-Hilaire, Quebec, Canada

General
- Category: Inosilicates
- Formula: Na(Mn^{2+},Ca)_{2}Si_{3}O_{8}(OH)
- IMA symbol: Srd
- Strunz classification: 9.DG.05
- Dana classification: 65.2.1.5
- Crystal system: Triclinic
- Crystal class: Pinacoidal (1̅) (same H-M symbol)
- Space group: P1̅
- Unit cell: a = 7.683(1) Å, b = 6.889(1) Å c = 6.747(1) Å, α = 90.53(5)° β = 94.12(2)°, γ = 102.75(2)° Z = 2

Identification
- Colour: salmon pink to orange
- Twinning: Around [010] composition plane {100}, less commonly contact twin on {110}
- Cleavage: Perfect on {001} and {100}
- Fracture: Irregular, uneven
- Tenacity: Brittle
- Mohs scale hardness: 5 to 5.5
- Luster: Vitreous to greasy; fibrous aggregates are dull to silky
- Streak: White
- Diaphaneity: Transparent, Translucent
- Density: 3.34 g/cm^{3} (measured)
- Optical properties: Biaxial (+)
- Refractive index: n_{α} = 1.668 n_{β} = 1.671 n_{γ} = 1.703
- Birefringence: δ = 0.035
- 2V angle: 39°
- Dispersion: r < v moderate

Serandite is a mineral with formula Na(Mn^{2+},Ca)_{2}Si_{3}O_{8}(OH). The mineral was discovered in Guinea in 1931 and named for J. M. Sérand. Serandite is generally red, brown, black or colorless.

== Description ==
Serandite is transparent to translucent and is normally salmon-pink, light pink, rose-red, orange, brown, black, or colorless; in thin section, it is colorless. Octahedrally bonded Mn(II) is the primary contributor to the mineral's pink colors.

Crystals of the mineral can be prismatic to acicular and elongated along [010], bladed, blocky, or tabular and flattened on {100}, occur as a radiating aggregate, or have massive habit. Sérandite is a member of the wollastonite group and is the manganese analogue of pectolite. It is sometimes used as a gemstone.

== History ==
Serandite was discovered on Rouma Island, part of the Los Islands in Guinea. The mineral was described by À. Lacroix in the journal Comptes rendus hebdomadaires des séances de l'Académie des Sciences. He named it sérandite in honor of J.M. Sérand, a mineral collector who helped in the collection of the mineral.

== Occurrence and distribution ==
Serandite has been found in Australia, Brazil, Canada, Guinea, Italy, Japan, Namibia, Norway, Russia, South Africa, and the United States. The type material is held at the National Museum of Natural History in Washington, D.C.

At Mont Saint-Hilaire, Quebec, serandite occurs in sodalite xenoliths and pegmatites cutting syenites within an intrusive alkalic gabbro-syenite complex. In Point of Rocks, New Mexico, it occurs in vugs in phonolite. At the Tumannoe deposit in Russia, serandite occurs in a manganese rich deposit associated with volcanic rocks and terrigenous (non-marine) sediments which has been altered by contact metamorphism.

Serandite has been found in association with aegirine, analcime, arfvedsonite, astrophyllite, eudialyte, fluorite, leucophanite, mangan-neptunite, microcline, nepheline, sodalite, and villiaumite.
