= Agpaitic rock =

Peralkaline igneous rock

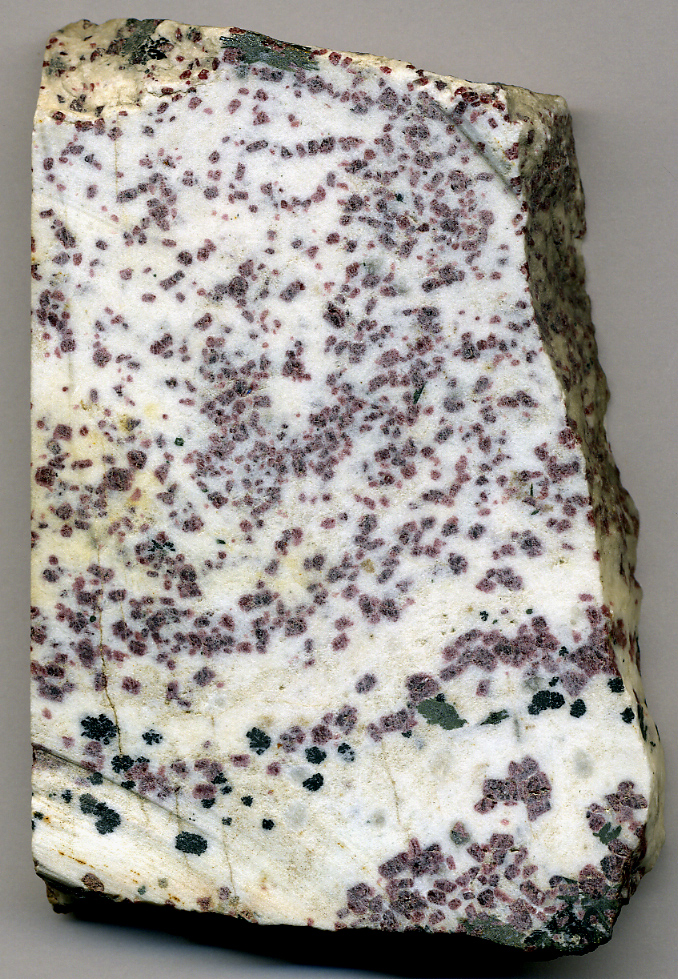
Kakortokite, a variety of agpaitic nepheline syenite, from the Ilimaussaq intrusive complex, Greenland

An agpaitic rock is a peralkaline igneous rock, typically nepheline syenite or phonolite. Characteristic minerals in these rocks include complex silicates containing zirconium, titanium, sodium, calcium, the rare-earth elements, and fluorine. Agpaites are unusually rich in rare and obscure minerals such as eudialyte, wöhlerite, loparite, astrophyllite, lorenzenite, catapleiite, lamprophyllite, and villiaumite (NaF). Sodalite is typically present, but not diagnostic. Less alkaline igneous rocks in which zircon, titanite, and ilmenite are characteristic are called miaskitic.

Agpaitic rocks were first described for an occurrence in the Ilimaussaq complex of southwest Greenland in 1911. Agpaitic rocks are present in the Lovozero and Khibiny Massif complexes of the Kola Peninsula, in Mont Saint-Hilaire, Quebec, Canada, in addition to the type locality of Ilimaussaq.
