= Oneillite =

Mineral of the eudialyte group

General
- Category: Silicate mineral, cyclosilicate
- Formula: Na_{15}Ca_{3}Mn_{3}Fe_{3}Zr_{3}Nb(Si_{25}O_{73})(O,OH,H_{2}O)_{3}(OH,Cl)_{2} (original form)
- IMA symbol: One
- Strunz classification: 9.CO.10
- Crystal system: Trigonal
- Crystal class: Pyramidal (3); H-M symbol: (3)
- Space group: R3
- Unit cell: a = 14.19, c = 29.98 [Å], Z = 3 (approximated)

Identification
- Color: Yellowish brown
- Crystal habit: anhedral grains
- Cleavage: None
- Fracture: Uneven
- Tenacity: Brittle
- Mohs scale hardness: 5–6
- Luster: Vitreous
- Streak: White
- Diaphaneity: Transparent or translucent
- Density: 3.20 g/cm^{3} (measured)
- Optical properties: Uniaxial (−)
- Refractive index: nω = 1.65 nε = 1.64 (approximated)
- Pleochroism: None

Oneillite is a rare mineral of the eudialyte group with the chemical formula Na_{15}Ca_{3}Mn_{3}Fe^{2+}_{3}Zr_{3}NbSiO(Si_{3}O_{9})_{2}(Si_{9}O_{27})_{2}(O,OH,H_{2}O)_{3}(OH,Cl)_{2}. The formula is based on the original one but extended to show the presence of cyclic silicate groups and domination of Si at the M4 site. The mineral has lowered symmetry (space group R3, instead of more specific for the group R3m one) due to Ca-Mn ordering. Similar feature is displayed by some other eudialyte-group members: aqualite, labyrinthite, raslakite, and voronkovite. Oneillite is strongly enriched in rare earth elements (REE, mainly cerium), but REE do not dominate any of its sites.

== Notes on chemistry ==
Rare earth elements in oneillite include cerium, lanthanum, neodymium, and yttrium, with minor praseodymium and gadolinium. Other impurities are potassium, and minor amounts of aluminium, hafnium, strontium and tantalum.

== Occurrence and association ==
Oneillite is one of four eudialyte-group minerals discovered within alkaline rocks of Mont Saint-Hilaire, Quebec, Canada. It associates with aegirine, albite, sodalite, and pyrite.
