= Villiaumite =

Halide mineral

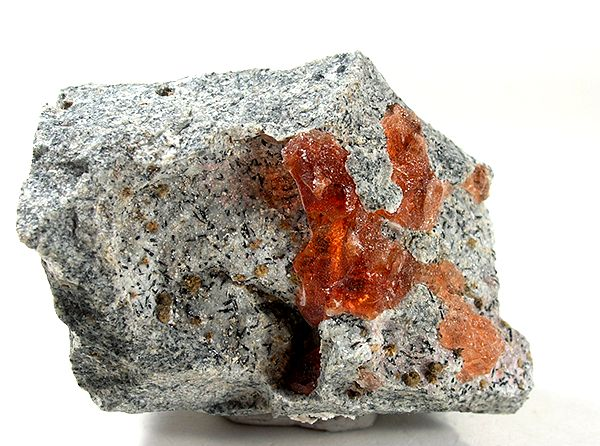

General
- Category: Halide mineral
- Formula: NaF
- Strunz classification: 3.AA.20
- Crystal system: Cubic
- Crystal class: Hexoctahedral (m3̅m); H-M symbol: (4/m 3̅ 2/m)
- Space group: Fm3̅m (No. 225)
- Unit cell: a = 4.63 Å; Z = 4

Identification
- Color: Carmine-red, lavender-pink to light orange
- Crystal habit: Cubic crystals rare, commonly granular, massive
- Cleavage: {001}, perfect
- Tenacity: Brittle
- Mohs scale hardness: 2 – 2.5
- Luster: Vitreous
- Streak: White
- Diaphaneity: Transparent
- Specific gravity: 2.79
- Optical properties: Isotropic; weak anomalous anisotropism, then uniaxial (–)
- Refractive index: n = 1.327–1.328
- Pleochroism: Strong E = yellow; O = pink to deep carmine
- Ultraviolet fluorescence: dark red to orange and yellow fluorescence under SW and LW UV
- Solubility: Soluble in water

Villiaumite is a rare halide mineral composed of sodium fluoride, NaF. It is very soluble in water and some specimens fluoresce under long and short wave ultraviolet light. It has a Mohs hardness of 2.5 and is usually red, pink, or orange in color. It is toxic to humans.

The red color is due to a broad absorption peaking at 512 nm. It is a result of radiation damage to the crystal.

== Occurrence ==
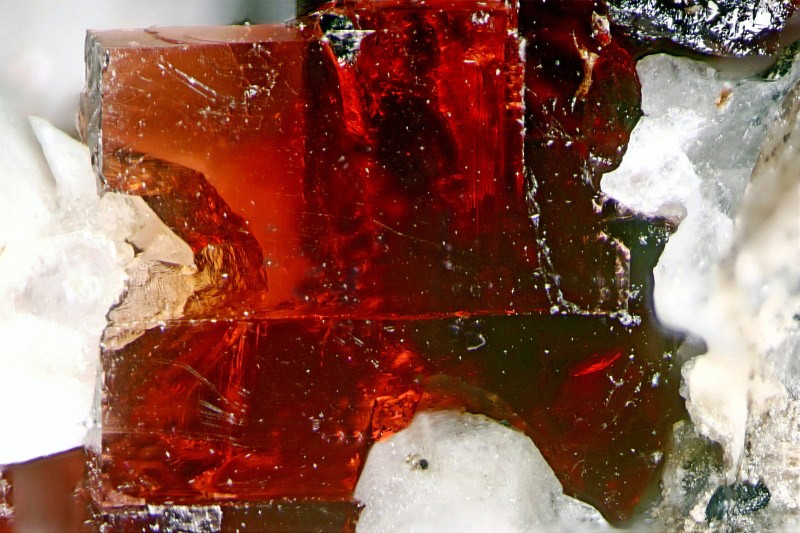
Villiaumite, (field of view 7.1 x 4.7 mm), Poudrette quarry, Mont Saint-Hilaire, Quebec, Canada

It occurs in nepheline syenite intrusives and in nepheline syenite pegmatites. It occurs associated with aegirine, sodalite, nepheline, neptunite, lamprophyllite, pectolite, serandite, eudialyte, ussingite, chkalovite and zeolites. It has been reported from Minas Gerais, Brazil; Mont Saint-Hilaire, Quebec, Canada; the Ilimaussaq complex of Greenland; Lake Magadi, Kenya; Windhoek District, Namibia; the Fen Complex, Telemark, Norway; the Khibiny and Lovozero Massifs, Kola Peninsula, Russia; Porphyry Mountain, Boulder County, Colorado and Point of Rocks Mesa, Colfax County, New Mexico, US.

It was first described in 1908 for an occurrence in Los Islands, Guinea and named after the French explorer, Maxime Villiaume.

== See also ==
- List of minerals
