= Ilyukhinite =

General
- Category: Silicate mineral, cyclosilicate
- Formula: see text
- IMA symbol: Ily
- Crystal system: Trigonal
- Crystal class: Ditrigonal pyramidal (3m); H-M symbol: (3m)
- Space group: R3m
- Unit cell: a = 14.1695, c = 31.026 [Å]

Identification

Ilyukhinite is a very rare mineral of the eudialyte group, with formula (H_{3}O,Na)_{14}Ca_{6}Mn_{2}Zr_{3}Si_{26}O_{72}(OH)_{2}·3H_{2}O. The formula given is simplified and does not show the presence of cyclic silicate groups. Ilyukhinite is the second group representative with species-defining hydronium ion after aqualite.
