= Aenigmatite =

Sapphirine supergroup, single chain inosilicate mineral

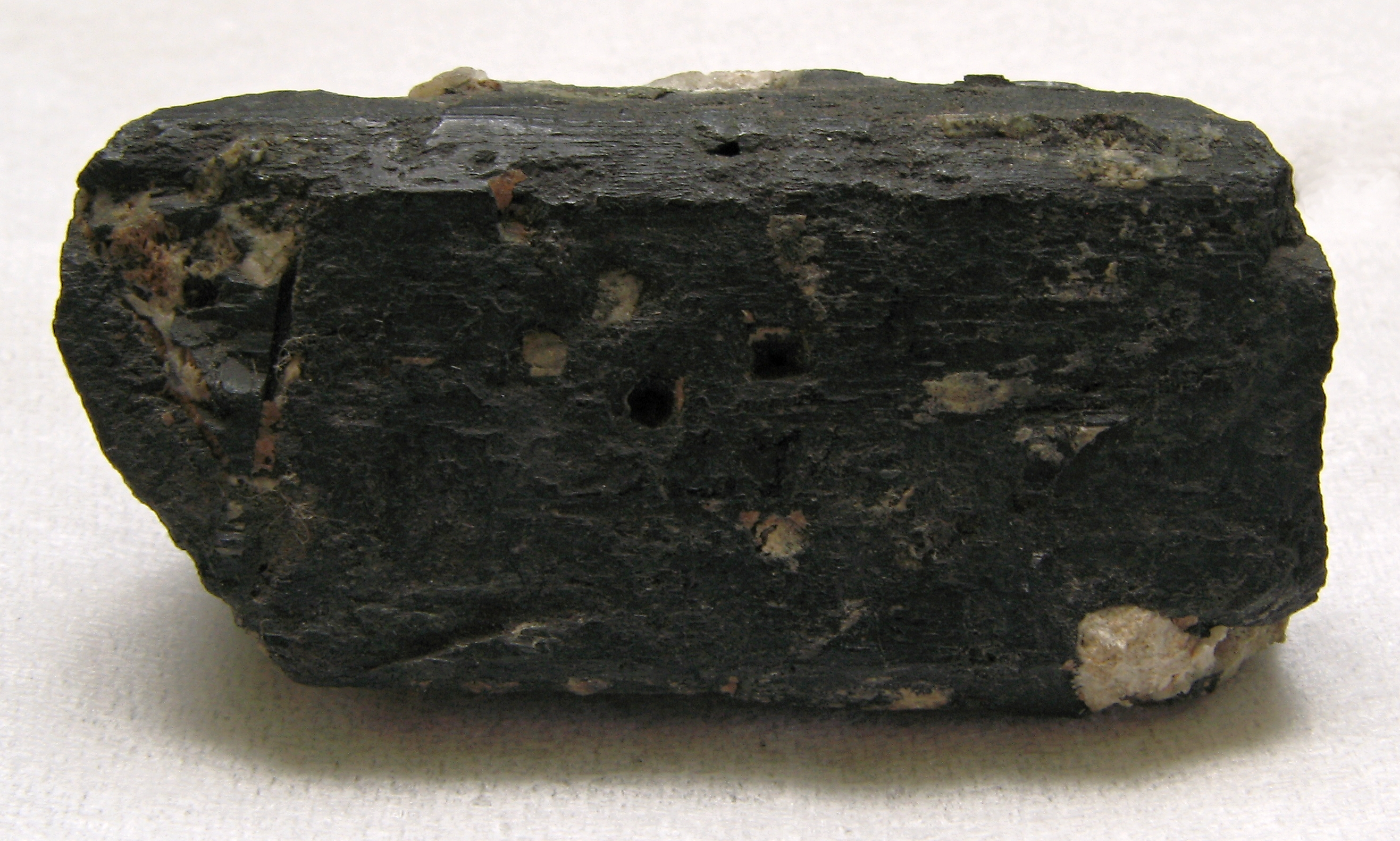
- Aenigmatite from Kangerdluarsuk, Greenland

General
- Category: Inosilicates
- Formula: Na_{2}Fe^{2+}_{5}TiSi_{6}O_{20}
- IMA symbol: Aen
- Strunz classification: 9.DH.40
- Crystal system: Triclinic
- Crystal class: Pinacoidal (1̅) (same H-M symbol)
- Space group: P1̅
- Unit cell: a = 10.415(1), b = 10.840(1) c = 8.931(1) [Å]; Z = 2 α = 105.107(4)° β = 96.610(5)° γ = 125.398(4)°

Identification
- Color: Velvet-black
- Crystal habit: Poorly developed prismatic crystals, occurring as irregular clusters; pseudomonoclinic
- Twinning: Complex by rotation perpendicular to (011̅) or about [010] of the pseudomonoclinic cell; polysynthetic
- Cleavage: Good on {010} and {100}
- Fracture: Uneven
- Tenacity: Brittle
- Mohs scale hardness: 5.5
- Luster: Vitreous to greasy
- Streak: Reddish brown
- Diaphaneity: Translucent to opaque
- Specific gravity: 3.81
- Optical properties: Biaxial (+)
- Refractive index: n_{α} = 1.780 – 1.800 n_{β} = 1.800 – 1.820 n_{γ} = 1.870 – 1.900
- Birefringence: δ = 0.090 – 0.100
- Pleochroism: X = yellow brown; Y = red-brown; Z = dark brown to black
- 2V angle: Measured: 27° to 55°
- Dispersion: r < v; very strong

Aenigmatite, also known as cossyrite after Cossyra, the ancient name of Pantelleria, is a sodium, iron, titanium inosilicate mineral. The chemical formula is Na_{2}Fe^{2+}_{5}TiSi_{6}O_{20} and its structure consists of single tetrahedral chains with a repeat unit of four and complex side branches. It forms brown to black triclinic lamellar crystals. It has Mohs hardness of 5.5 to 6 and specific gravity of 3.74 to 3.85. Aenigmatite forms a solid-solution series with wilkinsonite, Na_{2}Fe^{2+}_{4}Fe^{3+}_{2}Si_{6}O_{20}.

Aenigmatite is primarily found in peralkaline volcanic rocks, pegmatites, and granites as well as silica-poor intrusive rocks. It was first described by August Breithaupt in 1865 for an occurrence in the Ilimaussaq intrusive complex of southwest Greenland. Its name comes from αίνιγμα, the Greek word for "riddle".

It was also reported from the Kaidun meteorite, possibly a Mars meteorite, which landed in March 1980 in South Yemen. Other notable studied occurrences include:

- Narsaarsuk and elsewhere in Greenland.
- The Khibiny and Lovozero alkaline massifs on Kola Peninsula, Russia.
- The Yenisei Range, Krasnoyarsk Krai, Russia.
- The volcanic island of Pantelleria, Italy.
- In the United States, from Granite Mountain, near Little Rock, Pulaski County, Arkansas, and Santa Rosa, Sonoma County, California.
- In Australia, from Warrumbungle volcano, Nandewar volcano, and the Mount Warning complex, New South Wales; and the Peak Range Province, Queensland.
- In Canada, from Mount Edziza, the Ilgachuz and Rainbow Range shield complexes.
- From Logan Point quarry, Dunedin Volcano, New Zealand.

== See also ==
- List of minerals
