= Arfvedsonite =

Sodium amphibole mineral

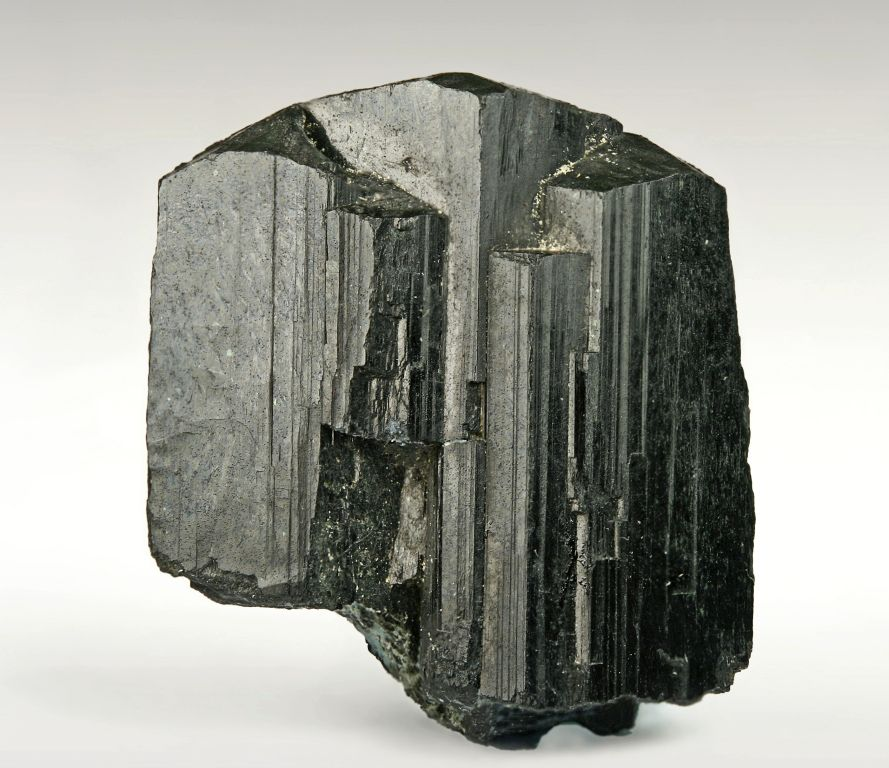

General
- Category: Inosilicates; Amphiboles
- Formula: [Na][Na_{2}][(Fe^{2+})_{4}Fe^{3+}][(OH)_{2}|Si_{8}O_{22}]
- IMA symbol: Arf
- Strunz classification: 9.DE.25 (10 ed); VIII/F.08-100 (8 ed)
- Dana classification: 66.1.3c.9
- Crystal system: Monoclinic
- Crystal class: Prismatic (2/m) (same H-M symbol)
- Space group: C2/m

Identification
- Color: Black, deep green on thin edges
- Crystal habit: Fibrous, radial prismatic aggregates
- Twinning: Simple or lamellar parallel to [100]
- Cleavage: Perfect on [110]
- Fracture: Uneven
- Tenacity: Brittle
- Mohs scale hardness: 5–6
- Luster: Vitreous
- Streak: Deep bluish gray, gray-green
- Diaphaneity: Translucent to opaque
- Specific gravity: 3.3–3.5
- Optical properties: Biaxial (−)
- Refractive index: n_{α} = 1.652–1.699 n_{β} = 1.660–1.705 n_{γ} = 1.666–1.708
- Birefringence: δ = 0.014
- Pleochroism: Strong: Blue-greens, yellow-browns, gray-violets
- Dispersion: r > v strong

Arfvedsonite (/ˈɑːrvɛdsənaɪt/) or soda hornblende (partiellement obsolète) is a sodium amphibole mineral with composition: [Na][Na_{2}][(Fe^{2+})_{4}Fe^{3+}][(OH)_{2}|Si_{8}O_{22}]. It crystallizes in the monoclinic prismatic crystal system and typically occurs as greenish black to bluish grey fibrous to radiating or stellate prisms.

It is a rather rare mineral occurring in nepheline syenite intrusions and agpaitic (peralkaline) pegmatites and granites as the Golden Horn batholith in Okanogan County, Washington (type locality for zektzerite). Occurrences include Mont Saint-Hilaire, Quebec, Canada; the Ilímaussaq complex in Southern Greenland; and in pegmatites of the Kola Peninsula, Russia. Its mineral association includes nepheline, albite, aegirine, riebeckite, katophorite and quartz.

Arfvedsonite was discovered in 1823 and named for the Swedish chemist Johan August Arfwedson (1792–1841).

== See also ==
- List of minerals
- List of minerals named after people

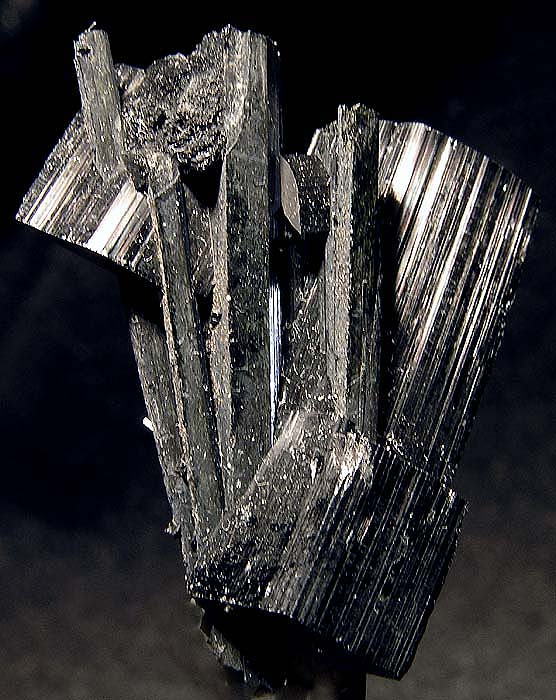
Arfvedsonite, Poudrette quarry, Mont Saint-Hilaire, Montérégie, Quebec
