= Lomonosovite =

Phosphate–silicate mineral

General
- Category: Minerals
- Formula: Na_{10}Ti_{4}(Si_{2}O_{7})_{2}(PO_{4})_{2}O_{4}
- IMA symbol: Lom
- Crystal system: Triclinic
- Unit cell: a = 5.49 Å, b = 7.11 Å, c = 14.5 Å α = 101°, β = 96°, γ = 90°

Identification
- Cleavage: Perfect
- Fracture: Irregular
- Tenacity: Brittle
- Mohs scale hardness: 3–4
- Density: 3.12 – 3.15
- Optical properties: Biaxial(−)
- Refractive index: nα = 1.670 nβ = 1.750 nγ = 1.778
- Birefringence: 0.108
- 2V angle: 56°

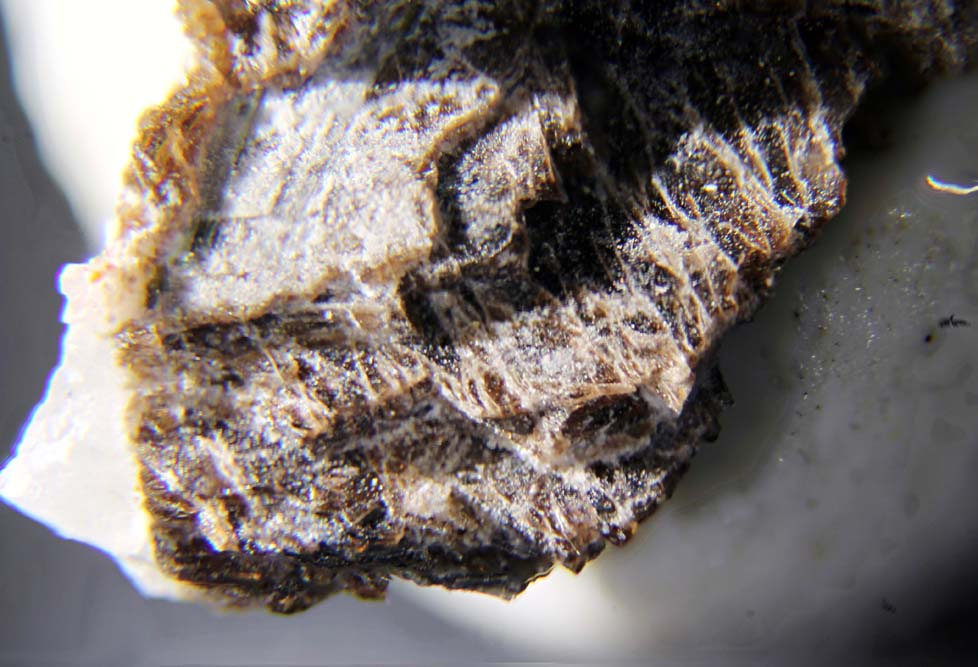
Image of Lomonisovite(beige) and bornemanite(white)

Lomonosovite is a phosphate–silicate mineral with the idealized formula Na_{10}Ti_{4}(Si_{2}O_{7})_{2}(PO_{4})_{2}O_{4} early Na_{5}Ti_{2}(Si_{2}O_{7})(PO_{4})O_{2} or Na_{2}Ti_{2}Si_{2}O_{9}·Na_{3}PO_{4}.

The main admixtures are niobium (up to 11.8% Nb_{2}O_{5}), manganese (up to 4.5 %MnO) and iron (up to 2.8%).

== Discovery and name ==
The mineral was discovered by V.I. Gerasimovskii in Lovozersky agpaitic massif. Named for Mikhail Lomonosov – famous Russian poet, chemist and philosopher, but the earlier – mining engineer.

== Crystal structure ==
According to X-ray data, lomonosovite structure was determined is triclinic unit cell with parameters: a = 5.44 Å, b = 7.163 Å, c = 14.83 Å, α = 99°, β = 106°, and γ = 90°, usually centrosymmetric (space group P1̅), but acentric varieties (polytype) are also reported.

The crystal structure of lomonosovite is based on three-layer HOH packets consisting of a central octahedral O layer and two outer heteropolyhedral H layers. Ti- and Na centered octahedra are distinguished in the O layer, whereas the H layers are composed of Ti-centered octahedra and Si_{2}O_{7} diorthogroups, (like in other heterophyllosilicates, for example lamprophyllite). The interpacket space includes Na^{+} cations and PO^{3−}_{4} anions.

== Properties ==
Lomonosovite forms lamellar and tabular crystals with perfect cleavage. It is macroscopically brown, from cinnamon-brown to black. It is transparent in thin plates. The luster vitreous to adamantine.

Its pleochroism is strong from colorless to brown. The refractive index is α = 1.654–1.670 β = 1.736 – 1.750 γ = 1.764–1.778 2V=56–69.

Hardness 3–4 Density 3.12 – 3.15.

== Origin ==
Accessory mineral of peralkaline agpaitic nepheline syenites (like Khibina and Lovozero massif, Russia, Ilimaussaq intrusion, Greenland) important mineral of agpaitic pegmatites and peralkaline fenites.
