= Aqualite =

Very rare mineral of the eudialyte group

General
- Category: Silicate mineral, cyclosilicate
- Formula: (H_{3}O)_{8}(Na,K,Sr)_{5}Ca_{6}Zr_{3}Si_{26}O_{66})(OH)_{9}Cl
- IMA symbol: Aq
- Strunz classification: 9.CO.10
- Crystal system: Trigonal
- Crystal class: Pyramidal (3); H-M symbol: (3)
- Space group: R3
- Unit cell: a = 14.08, c = 31.24 [Å] (approximated); Z = 3

Identification
- Color: Pink (pale)
- Crystal habit: idiomorphic crystals (max. 3 cm)
- Cleavage: None
- Fracture: Conchoidal
- Mohs scale hardness: 4–5
- Luster: Vitreous
- Streak: White
- Diaphaneity: Translucent
- Density: 2.58 (measured), 2.66 (calculated)
- Optical properties: Uniaxial (+)
- Refractive index: n_{ω} = 1.57, n_{ε} = 1.57 (approximated)
- Pleochroism: Colorless to pink (W), pink (E)
- Ultraviolet fluorescence: dull yellow (weak)

Aqualite is a very rare mineral of the eudialyte group, with formula (H_{3}O)_{8}(Na,K,Sr)_{5}Ca_{6}Zr_{3}SiSi(Si_{24}O_{66})(OH)_{9}Cl. The formula given does not show the presence of cyclic silicate groups. The original formula was extended to show the presence of silicon at both M3 and M4 sites, according to the nomenclature of the eudialyte group. Aqualite is unique among the eudialyte group in being hydronium-rich (the only other eudialyte-group species with essential hydronium, is the recently discovered ilyukhinite). Among the other representatives of the group it also distinguish in splitting of the M1 site into two sub-sites, both occupied by calcium. Thus, its symmetry is lowered from typical for most eudialytes R3m (or R-3m) to R3. The name refers to high content of water in the mineral.

== Notes on chemistry ==
Elements occurring as admixtures in aqualite include barium, iron, rare-earth elements (including cerium), titanium, aluminium and trace niobium.

== Occurrence and association ==
Aqualite was discovered among peralkaline pegmatites of the Inagli massif, Sakha-Yakutia, Russia. Associated minerals are aegirine, batisite, eckermanite, innelite, lorezenite, natrolite, microcline, thorite, and galena.

== Origin ==
Aqualite is thought to be formed by ion exchange transformation of a precursor mineral.
