= Pectolite =

Silicate mineral

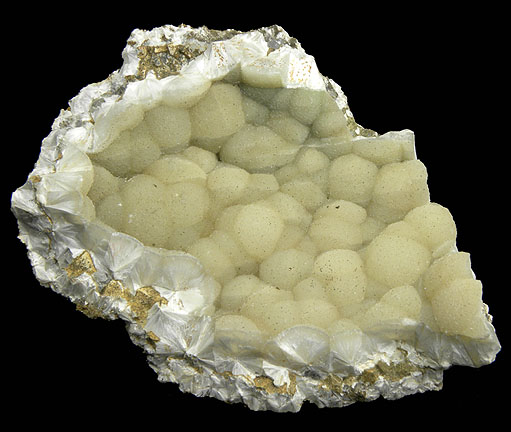

General
- Category: Inosilicate mineral
- Formula: NaCa_{2}Si_{3}O_{8}(OH)
- IMA symbol: Pct
- Crystal system: Triclinic
- Crystal class: Pinacoidal (1̅) (same H-M symbol)
- Space group: P1̅
- Unit cell: a = 7.99 Å, b = 7.03 Å, c = 7.03 Å; α = 90.51°, β = 95.21°, γ = 102.53°; Z = 2

Identification
- Color: Colorless, whitish, grayish, yellowish
- Crystal habit: Tabular to acicular, radiating fibrous, spheroidal, or columnar; massive
- Twinning: Twin axis [010] with composition plane [100], common
- Cleavage: Perfect on {100} and {001}
- Fracture: Uneven
- Tenacity: Brittle; tough when compact
- Mohs scale hardness: 4.5 – 5
- Luster: Silky, subvitreous
- Streak: White
- Diaphaneity: Translucent to opaque
- Specific gravity: 2.84 – 2.90
- Optical properties: Biaxial (+)
- Refractive index: n_{α} = 1.594 – 1.610 n_{β} = 1.603 – 1.614 n_{γ} = 1.631 – 1.642
- Birefringence: δ = 0.037
- 2V angle: Measured: 50° to 63°, Calculated: 42° to 60°
- Dispersion: r > v weak to very strong

Pectolite is a white to gray mineral, NaCa_{2}Si_{3}O_{8}(OH), a sodium calcium hydroxide inosilicate. It crystallizes in the triclinic system typically occurring in radiated or fibrous crystalline masses. It has a Mohs hardness of 4.5 to 5 and a specific gravity of 2.7 to 2.9. A highly sought-after variety known as larimar, is a pale to sky blue. There is also a whitish form of the mineral from Alaska that is sometimes marketed as 'Alaska jade'.

== Occurrence ==
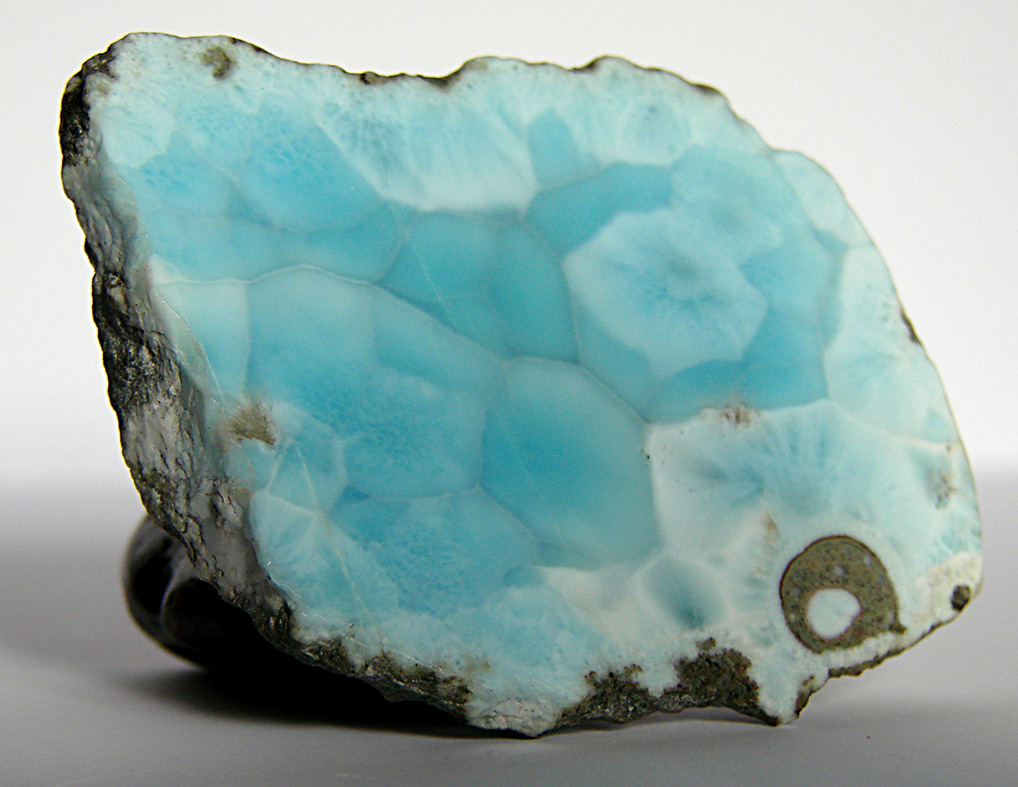
Pectolite var. Larimar

It was first described in 1828 at Mount Baldo, Trento Province, Italy, and named from the Greek pektos – "compacted" and lithos – "stone".

It occurs as a primary mineral in nepheline syenites, within hydrothermal cavities in basalts and diabase and in serpentinites in association with zeolites, datolite, prehnite, calcite and serpentine. It is found in a wide variety of worldwide locations.

== See also ==
- Serandite – the manganese analogue
