= Ilimaussaq intrusive complex =

Alkalic layered intrusion located in Greenland

Coordinates: 60°56′05″N 45°52′09″W

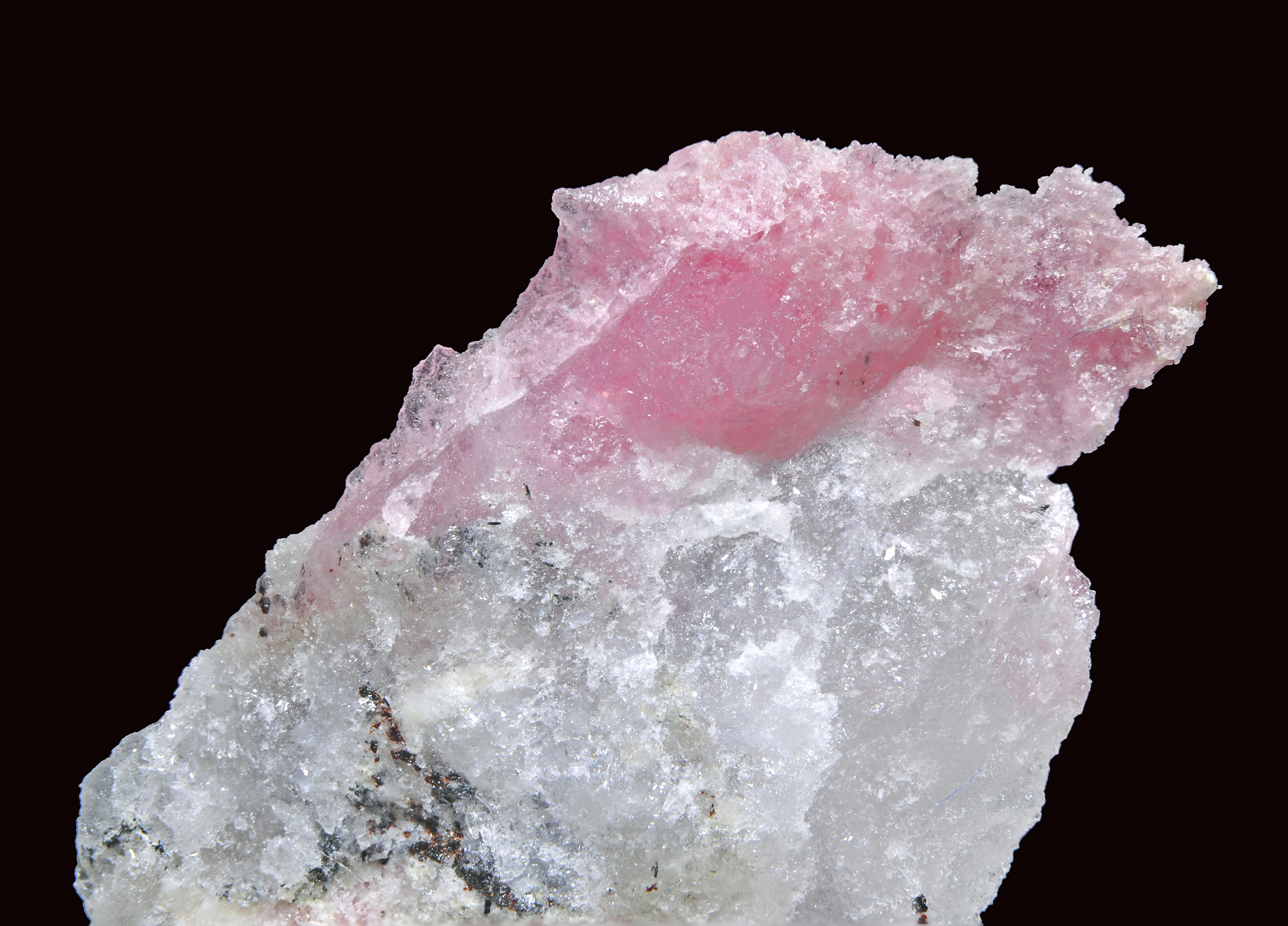
Tugtupite on quartz from Ilimaussaq complex

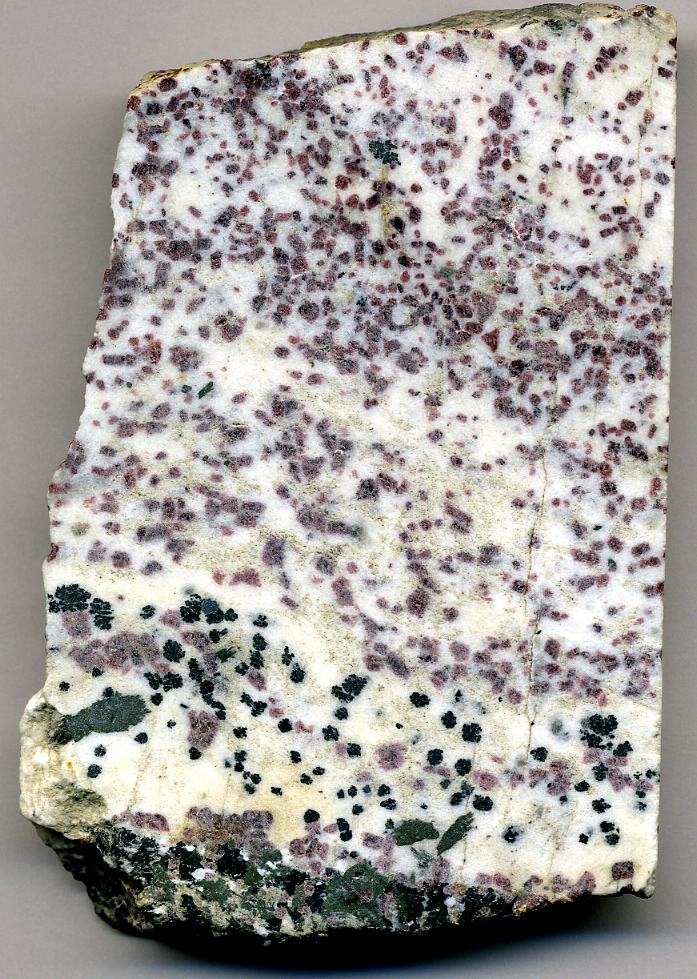
Kakortokite, a variety of agpaitic nepheline syenite, from the Ilimaussaq intrusive complex

The Ilimaussaq intrusive complex is a large alkalic layered intrusion located on the southwest coast of Greenland. It is Mesoproterozoic in age, about 1.16 Ga. It is the type locality of agpaitic nepheline syenite and hosts a variety of unusual rock types.

== Description ==
The complex is noted for a wide variety of rare minerals and is the type locality for thirty minerals, including: aenigmatite, arfvedsonite, sodalite, eudialyte and tugtupite.

The complex has an areal extent of 8 by 17 km, and an exposed thickness of 1700 m. The complex includes Kvanefjeld, a uranium deposit and a large reserve of rare-earth elements, zirconium, niobium and beryllium.
