= Eudialyte =

Cyclosilicate mineral

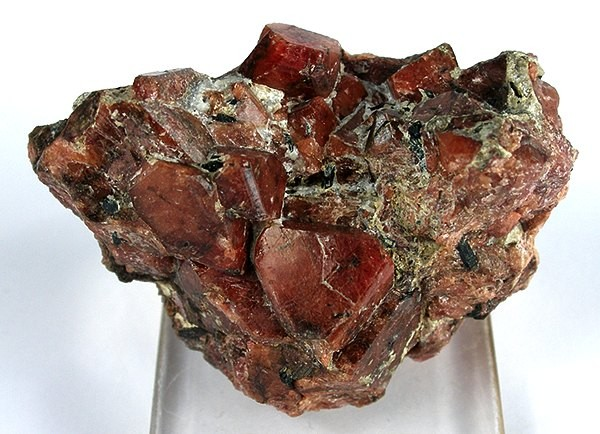

General
- Category: Cyclosilicate
- Formula: Na_{15}Ca_{6}(Fe,Mn)_{3}Zr_{3}SiO(O,OH,H_{2}O)_{3} (Si_{3}O_{9})_{2}(Si_{9}O_{27})_{2}(OH,Cl)_{2}
- IMA symbol: Eud
- Strunz classification: 9.CO.10
- Crystal system: Trigonal
- Crystal class: Hexagonal scalenohedral (3̅m); H-M symbol: (3̅ 2/m)
- Space group: R3̅m
- Unit cell: a = 14.31, c = 30.15 [Å]; Z = 12

Identification
- Color: Red, magenta, brown; also blue and yellow
- Crystal habit: Crystals short rhombohedral to long prismatic, granular, irregular masses
- Cleavage: Distinct on {0001} imperfect on {112̅0}
- Fracture: Uneven
- Tenacity: Brittle
- Mohs scale hardness: 5–6
- Luster: Vitreous
- Streak: White
- Diaphaneity: Transparent to translucent
- Specific gravity: 2.74–3.10
- Optical properties: Uniaxial (+/−)
- Refractive index: n_{ω} = 1.606–1.610 n_{ε} = 1.610–1.613
- Birefringence: δ = 0.004
- Pleochroism: Weak: O= colorless, pale yellow, pink; E= pink to colorless
- Solubility: H_{2}SO_{4}
- Other characteristics: Mildly Radioactive

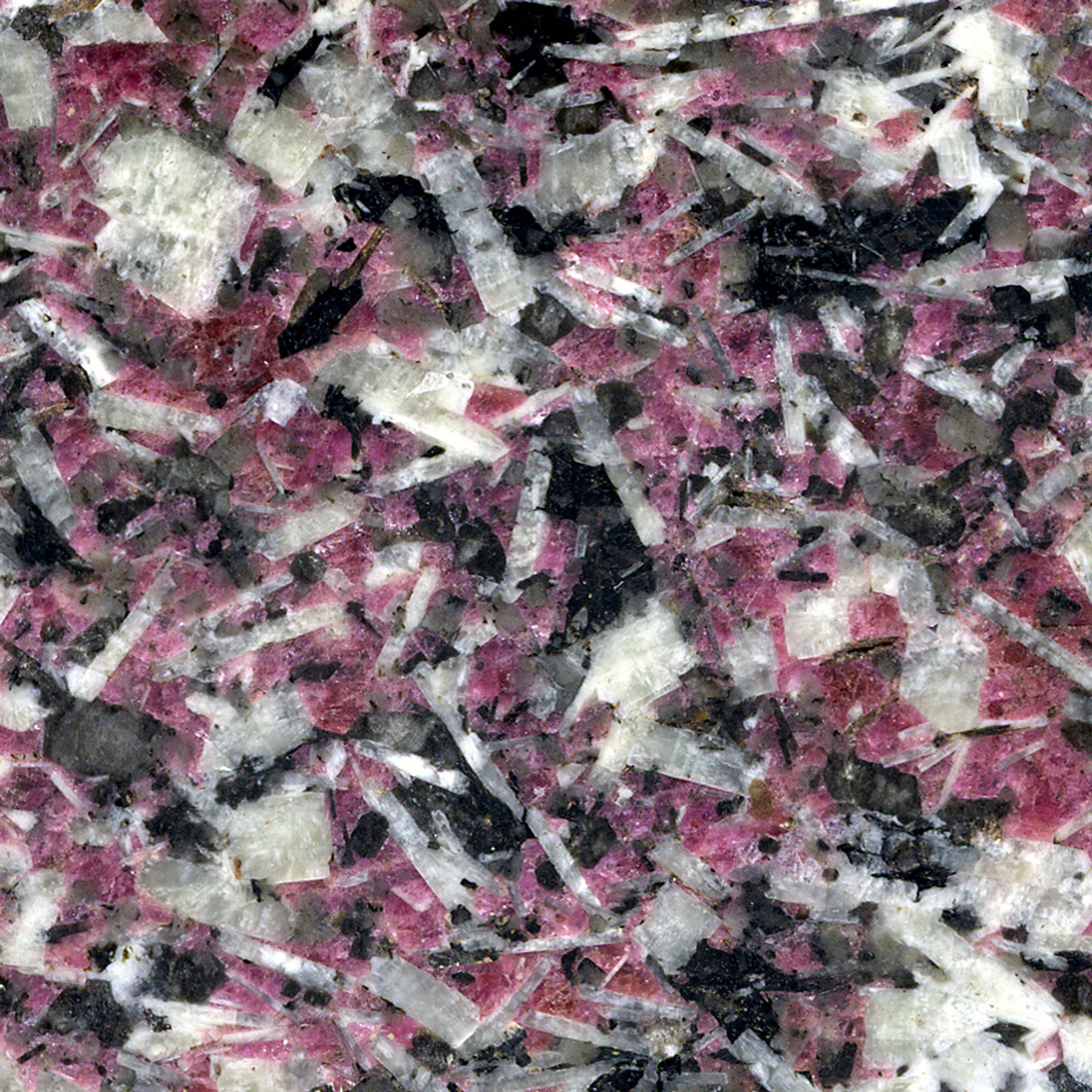
Pink eudialyte in syenite (lujavrite) from Poços de Caldas, Brazil. The white mineral is alkali feldspar, the black is aegirine, and the little brown bits are biotite.

Eudialyte, whose name derives from the Greek phrase Εὖ διάλυτος, eu dialytos, meaning "well decomposable", is a somewhat rare, nine-member-ring cyclosilicate mineral, which forms in alkaline igneous rocks, such as nepheline syenites. Its name alludes to its ready solubility in acid.

Eudialyte was first described in 1819 for an occurrence in nepheline syenite of the Ilimaussaq intrusive complex of southwest Greenland.

== Uses ==
Eudialyte is used as a minor ore of zirconium. Another use of eudialyte is as a minor gemstone, but this use is limited by its rarity, which is compounded by its poor crystal habit. These factors make eudialyte of primary interest as a collector's mineral. Eudialyte typically has a significant content of U, Pb, Nb, Ta, Zr, Hf, and rare earth elements (REE). Because of this, geoscientists use eudialyte as a geochronometer to date and investigate the genesis of the host rocks.

== Associated minerals ==
Eudialyte is found associated with other alkalic igneous minerals, in addition to some minerals common to most igneous material in general.

Associate minerals include: microcline, nepheline, aegirine, lamprophyllite, lorenzenite, catapleiite, murmanite, arfvedsonite, sodalite, aenigmatite, rinkite, låvenite, titanite and titanian magnetite.

== Alternative names ==
Alternative names of eudialyte include: almandine spar, eudalite, Saami blood. Eucolite is the name of an optically negative variety, more accurately the group member: ferrokentbrooksite.

== Notes for identification ==
Eudialyte's rarity makes locality useful in its identification. Prominent localities of eudialyte include Mont Saint-Hilaire in Canada, Kola Peninsula in Russia and Poços de Caldas in Brazil, but it is also found in Greenland, Norway, and Arkansas. The lack of crystal habit, associated with color, is also useful for identification, as are associated minerals. A pink-red mineral with no good crystals associated with other alkaline igneous material, especially nepheline and aegirine, is a good indication a specimen is eudialyte. Iron (Fe^{2+}) provides the color.

== Eudialyte group ==
Microchemical (by electron microprobe) and structural analyses of different eudialyte (and related) samples have revealed the presence of many new eudialyte-like minerals. These minerals are structurally and chemically related and joined into the eudialyte group. The group includes Zr^{−}, OH^{−}, Cl^{−}, F^{−}, CO_{3}^{−} and possibly also SO_{4}-bearing silicates of Na, K, H_{3}O, Ca, Sr, REEs, Mn, Fe, Nb and W. Electron vacancies can be present in their structure, too.
