= Catapleiite =

Mineral

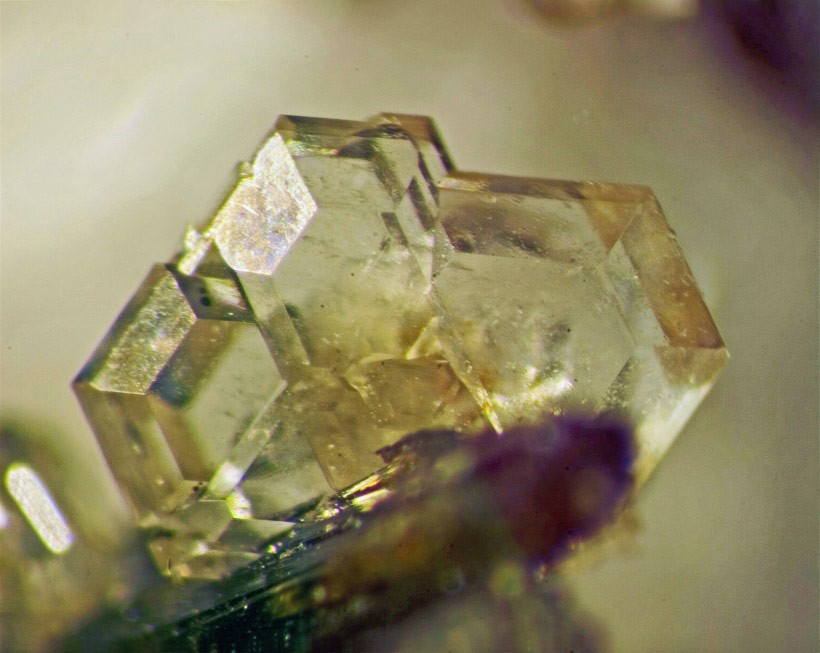
- Catapleiite.Locality: Poudrette quarry (Demix quarry; Uni-Mix quarry; Desourdy quarry; Carrière Mont Saint-Hilaire), Mont Saint-Hilaire, La Vallée-du-Richelieu RCM, Montérégie, Québec, Canada

General
- Category: Minerals
- Formula: Na_{2}ZrSi_{3}O_{9}·2H_{2}O
- IMA symbol: Ctp

Identification
- Color: Colorless, tan, brownish-red, light yellow, dark brown, flesh red, orangish
- Mohs scale hardness: 5.5–6
- Luster: Vitreous, dull
- Specific gravity: 2.65–2.9

Catapleiite (Na_{2}ZrSi_{3}O_{9}·2H_{2}O) is a dimorph of gaidonnayite rarely found by itself. Its name derives from the Greek words "κατα" (kata) and "πλειον" (pleion) meaning "with more" as it is mostly accompanied by a number of rare minerals. When pure it is colorless, but it is most often seen as a tan, brownish-red, light yellow, dark brown, flesh red or orangish in color. It is mostly found on Låven Island, Norway. Its hardness on the Mohs scale is around 5.5–6. It has a monoclinic crystal system.
