= Lovozero Massif =

Mountain range on the Kola Peninsula, Russia

Coordinates: 67°50′45″N 34°40′11″E

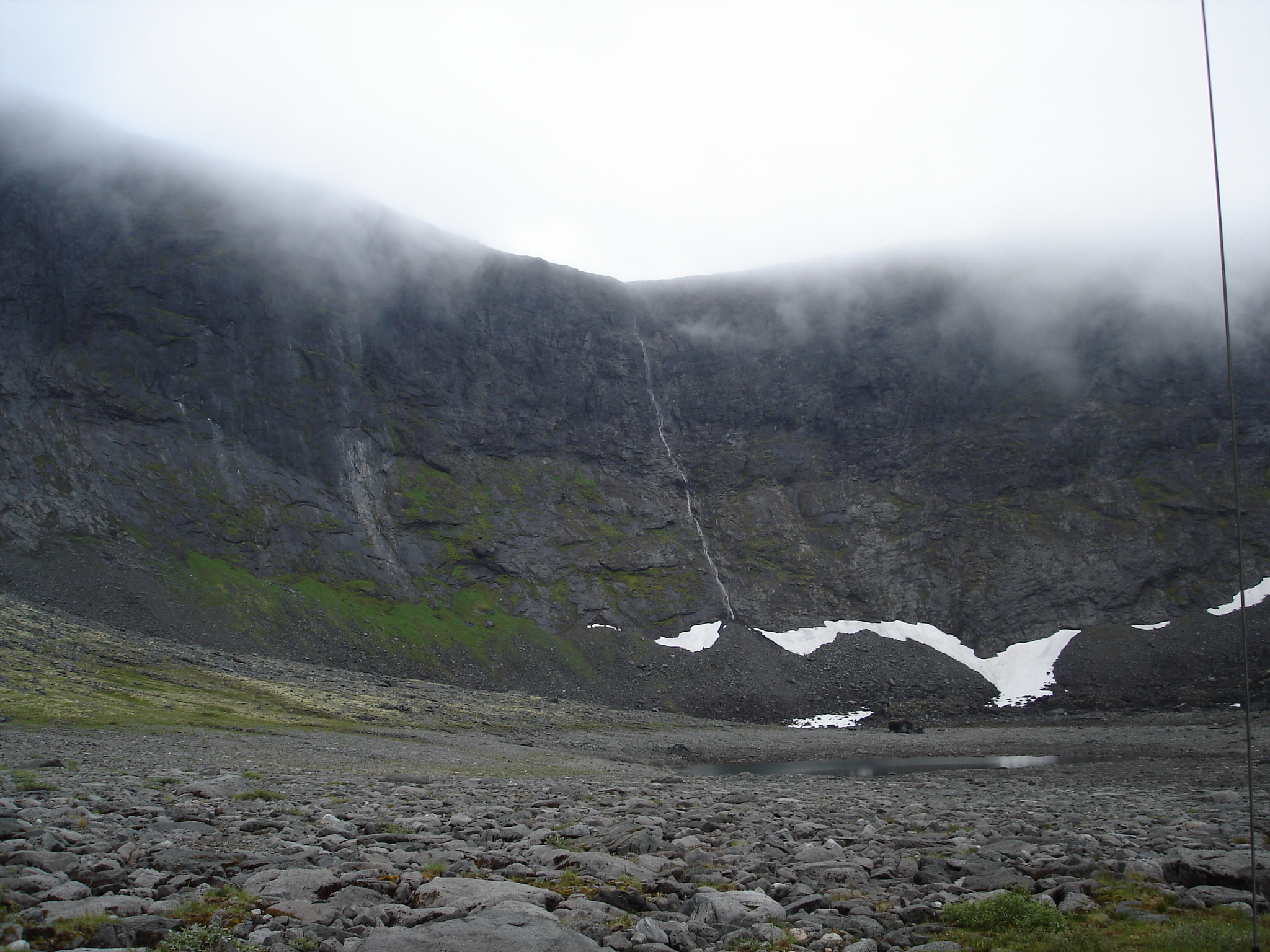

The Lovozero Massif (Russian: Ловозёрские тундры, Lovozyorskiye Tundry, named after the lake in that area – Lake Lovozero; the region is also known as Ловозёрье, Lovozyorye) is a mountain range located in the center of the Kola Peninsula in Russia, between Lovozero and Lake Umbozero, and constitutes a horseshoe-shaped ridge of picturesque hills, that surround the Seydozero Lake. The slopes are covered mainly with spruce and pine. The highest point is Mount Angvundaschorr (1,120 m). The area around the lake is inhabited by Saami, and many place names are of non-Russian origin.

== Geology ==
The Lovozero Massif is underlain by a complex of agpaitic to hyperagpaitic rocks containing minerals as eudialyte, loparite (an ore of niobium and tantalum), natrosilite (anhydrous sodium silicate), etc. At least 105 valid minerals have been described in the massif and 39 minerals were initially discovered there. The only other areas with similar geology and mineralogy are Khibiny Massif (immediately west of Lovozero), Ilimaussaq in SW Greenland and Mont-Saint-Hilaire, Quebec, Canada.

== Toponyms in Lovozero Tundras ==
=== Settlements ===
- Ilma (Ильма)
- Puncha (Пунча)
- Motka (Мотка)

=== Lakes, bays ===
- Lovozero (Ловозеро)
- Umbozero (Умбозеро)
- Seidozero (Сейдозеро)
- Sengisyavr (Сенгисъявр)
- Rayavr (Райявр)
- Motka Bay (Мотка-Губа)

=== Rivers, creeks ===
- Ilmayok (Ильмайок)
- Elmorayok (Эльморайок)
- Seidyok (Сейдйок)
- Kiftuay (Куфтуай)
- Kitkuay (Киткуай)
- Uelkuay (Уэлькуай)
- Sigsuay (Сигсуай)
- Tavayok (Тавайок)
- Muruay (Муруай)
- Chivruay (Чивруай)
- Kuansuay (Куансуай)
- Iidichyok (Иидичйок)
- Vavnyok (Вавнйок)
- Koklukhtiuay (Коклухтиуай)

=== Massifs, mounts, passes ===
- Alluayv (Аллуайв)
- Angvundaschorr (Ангвундасчорр)
- Sengischorr (Сенгисчорр)
- Mannepakhk (Маннепахк)
- Elmorayok Pass
- Kuftuay Pass
- Chivruay-Ladv Pass (Чивруай-Ладв)
- Strashempakhk (Страшемпахк)
- Engpor (Энгпор)
- Suoluayv (Суолуайв)
- Punkaruayv (Пункаруайв)
- Ninchurt (Нинчурт)
- Mount Karnasurta (Карнасурта)
- Mount Kuyvchorr (Куйвчорр)
- Mount Kuamdespakhk (Куамдеспахк)
- Mount Vavnbed (Вавнбед) (per Pekov: Lovozero Massif p. 32)

== Gallery ==
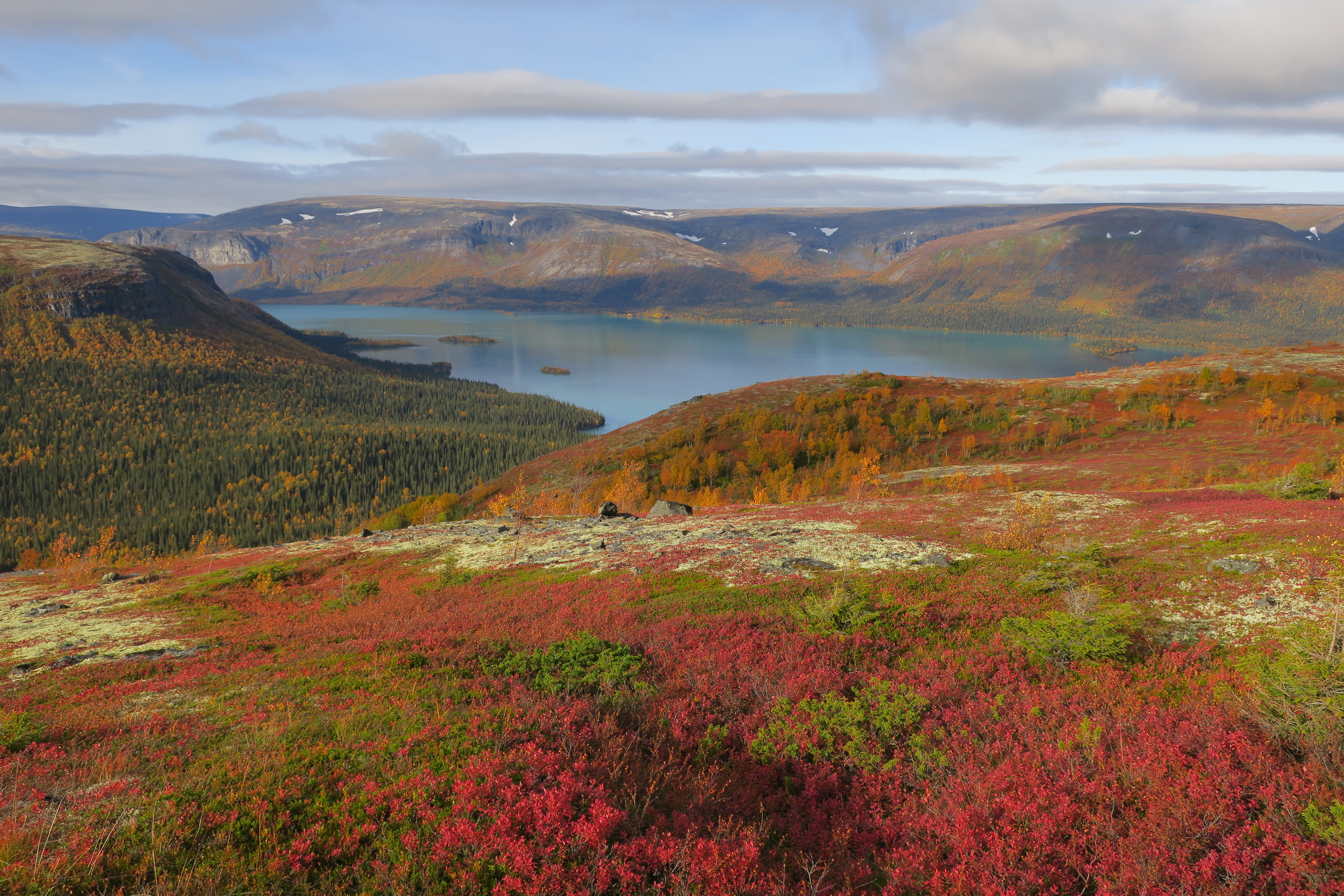
Lake Seydozero seen from the Mount Ninchurt

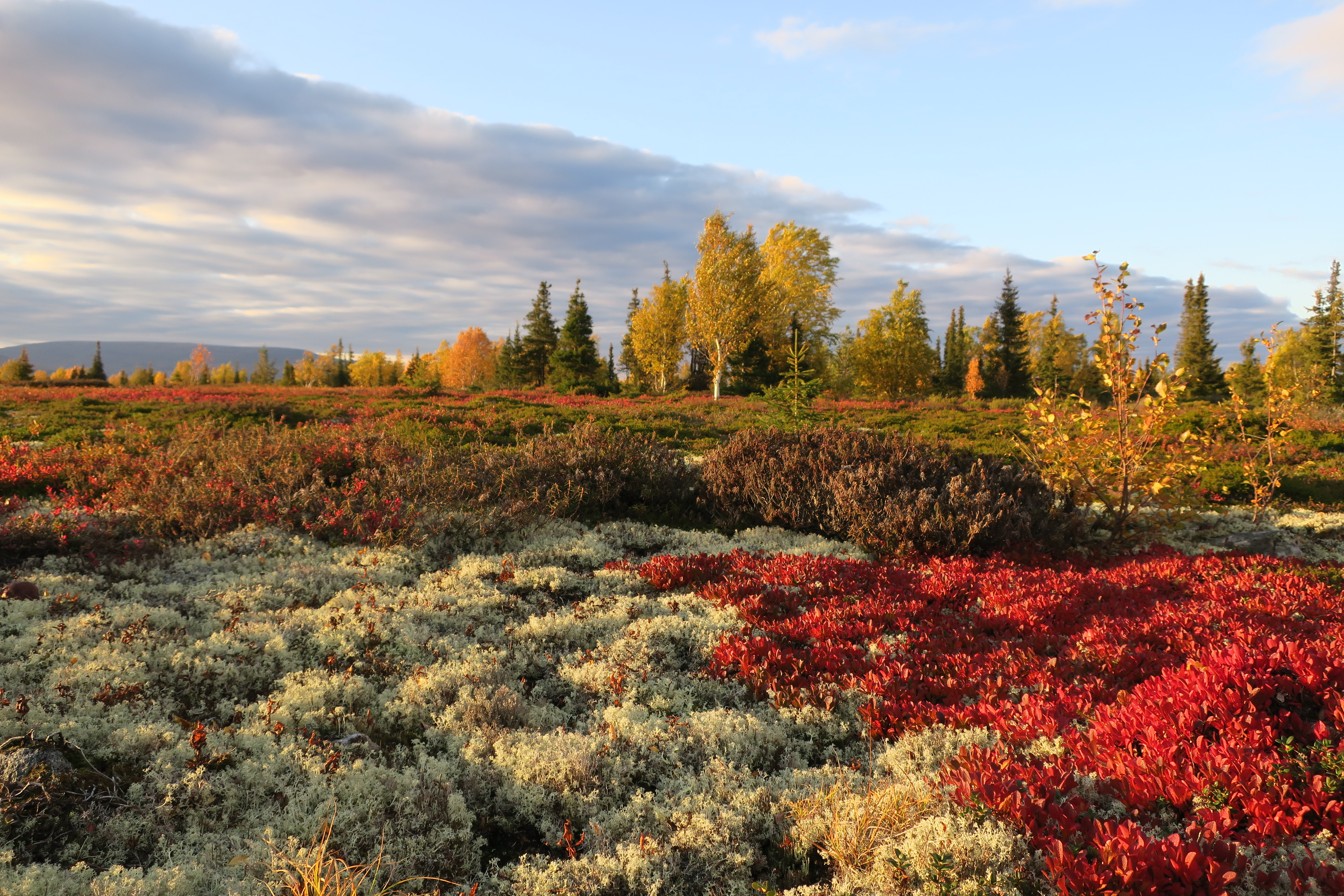
Arctic tundra in vivid fall colors near lake Lovozero

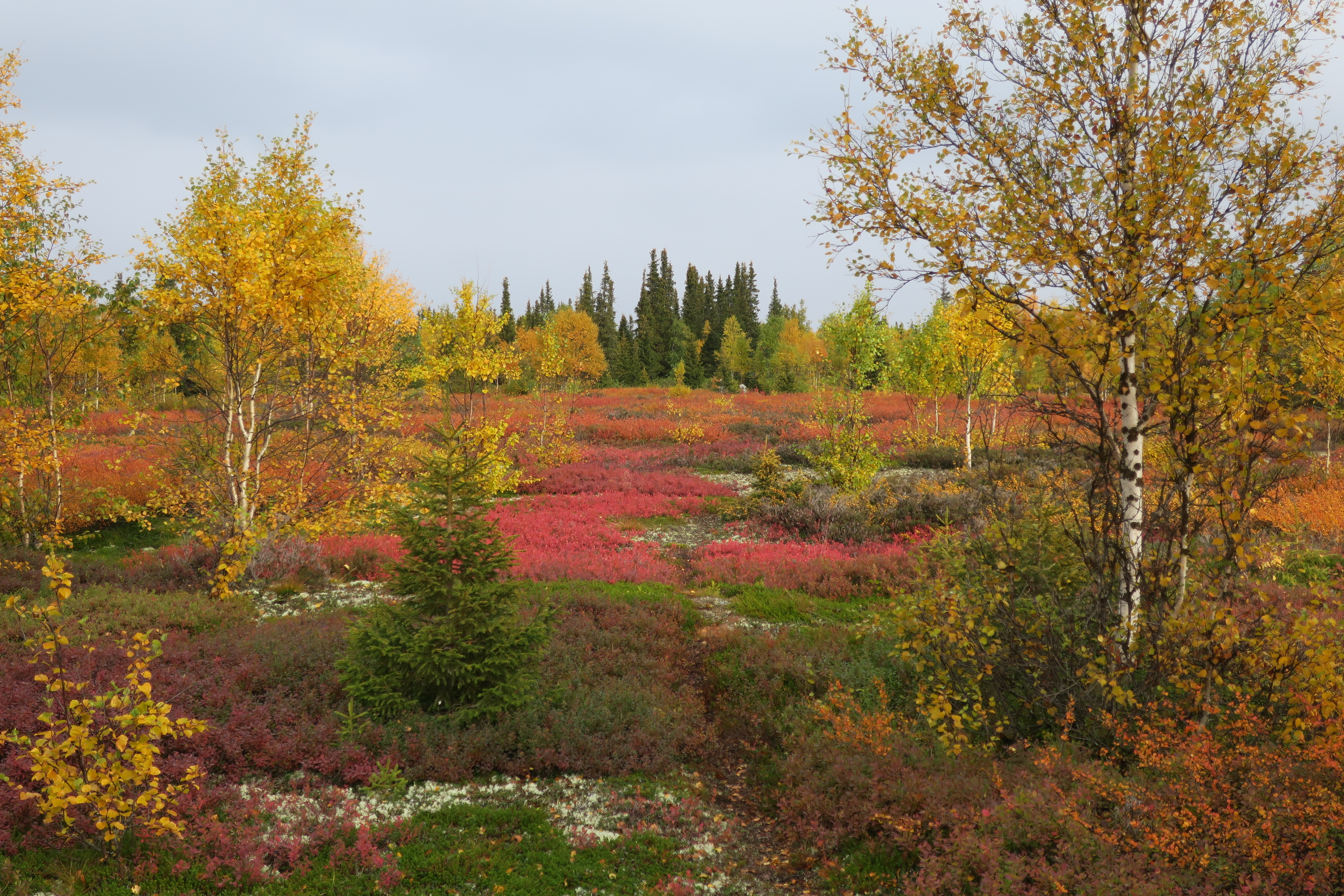
Autumn colors on the shore of Lake Lovozero

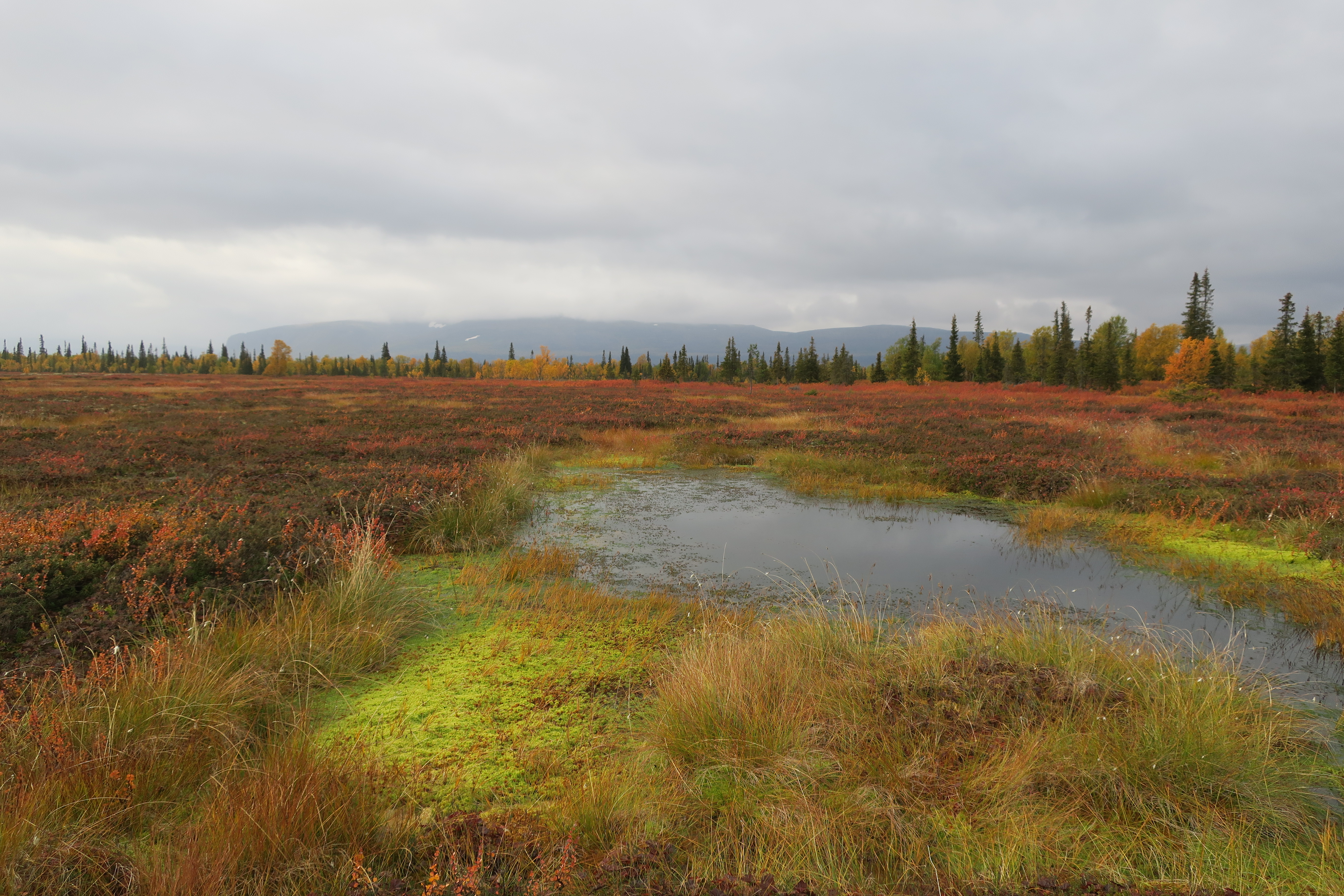
Boggy swamps of the Lovozero Massif

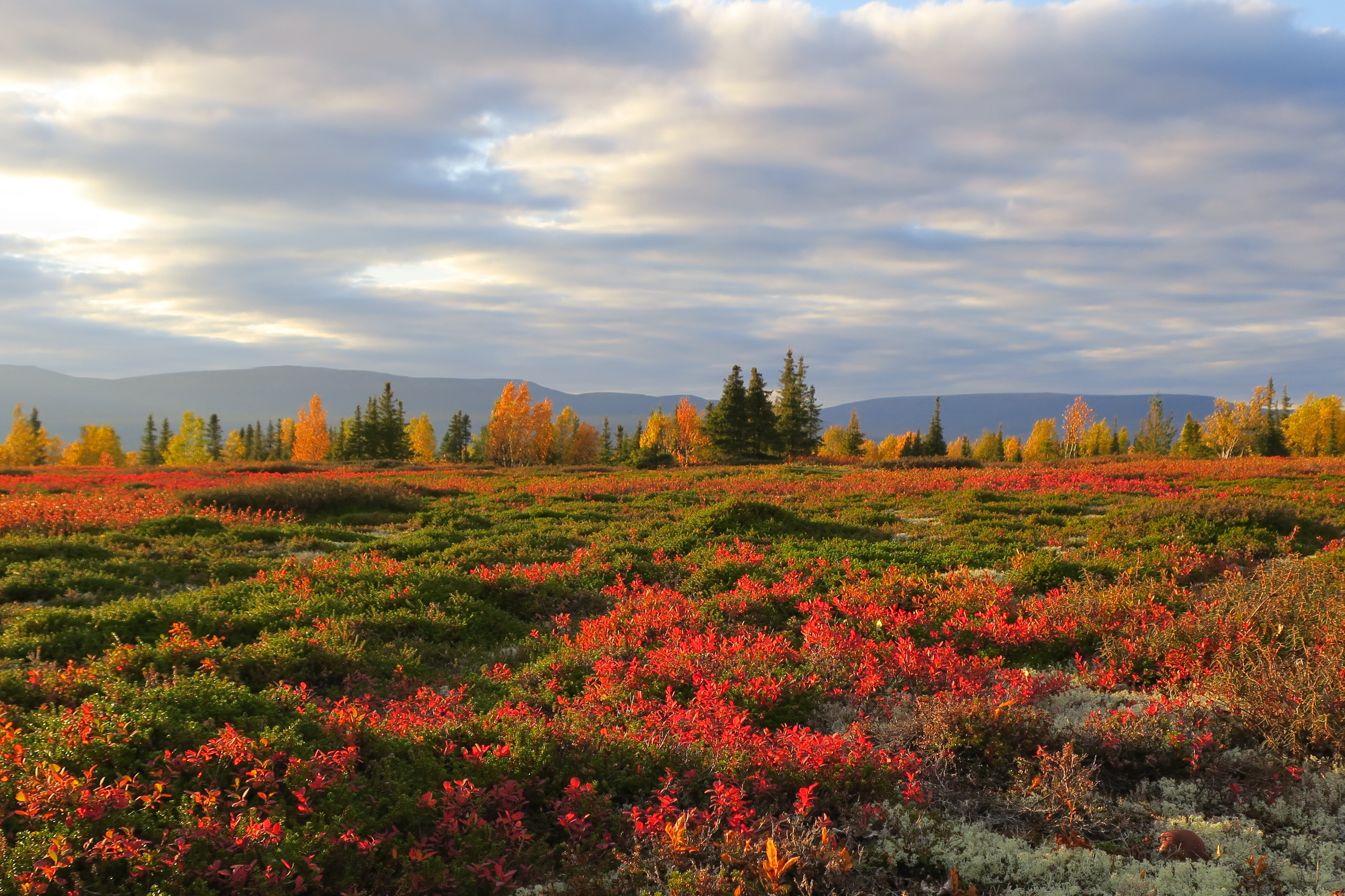
Along the shore of Lake Lovozero

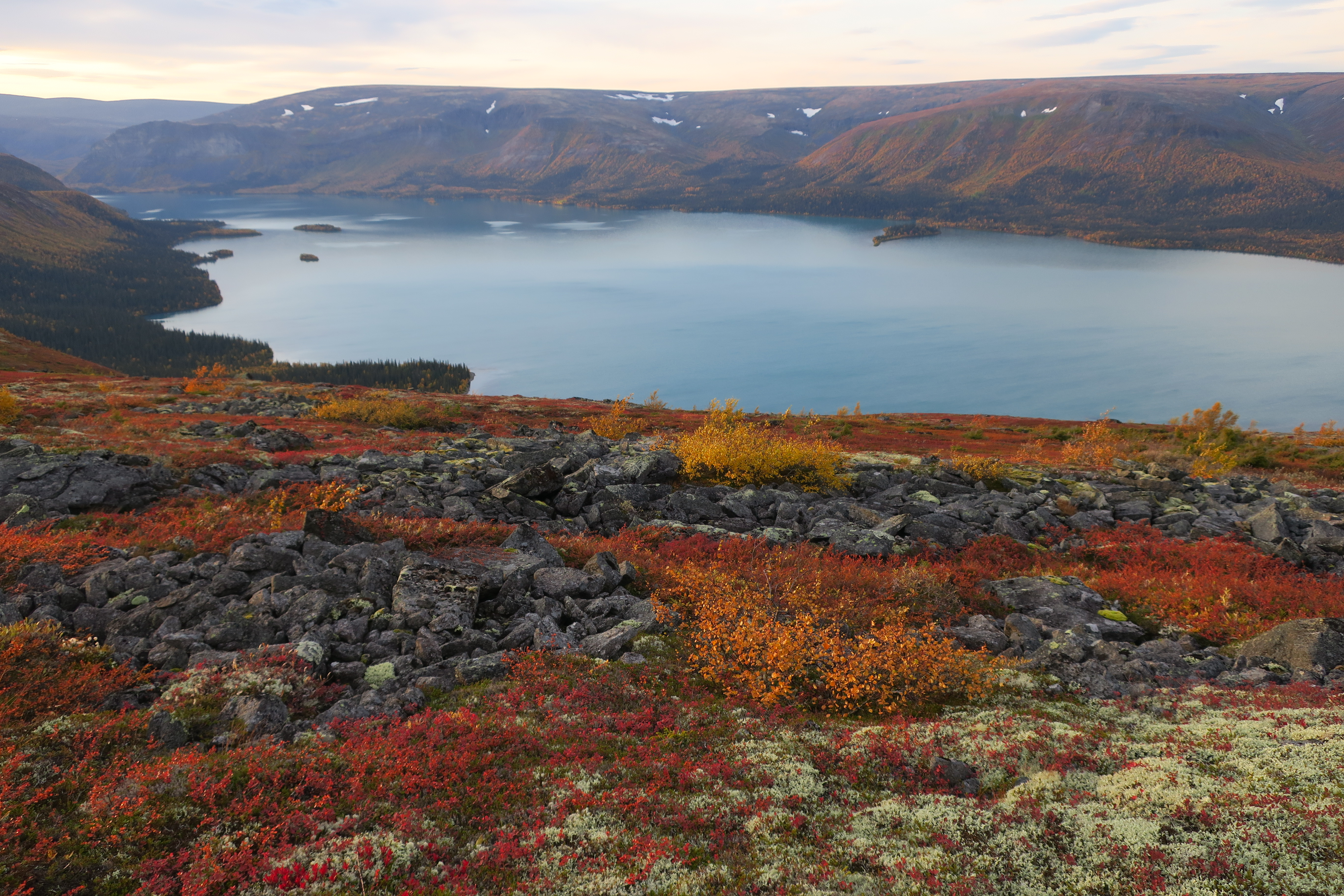
Lake Seydozero in fall colors

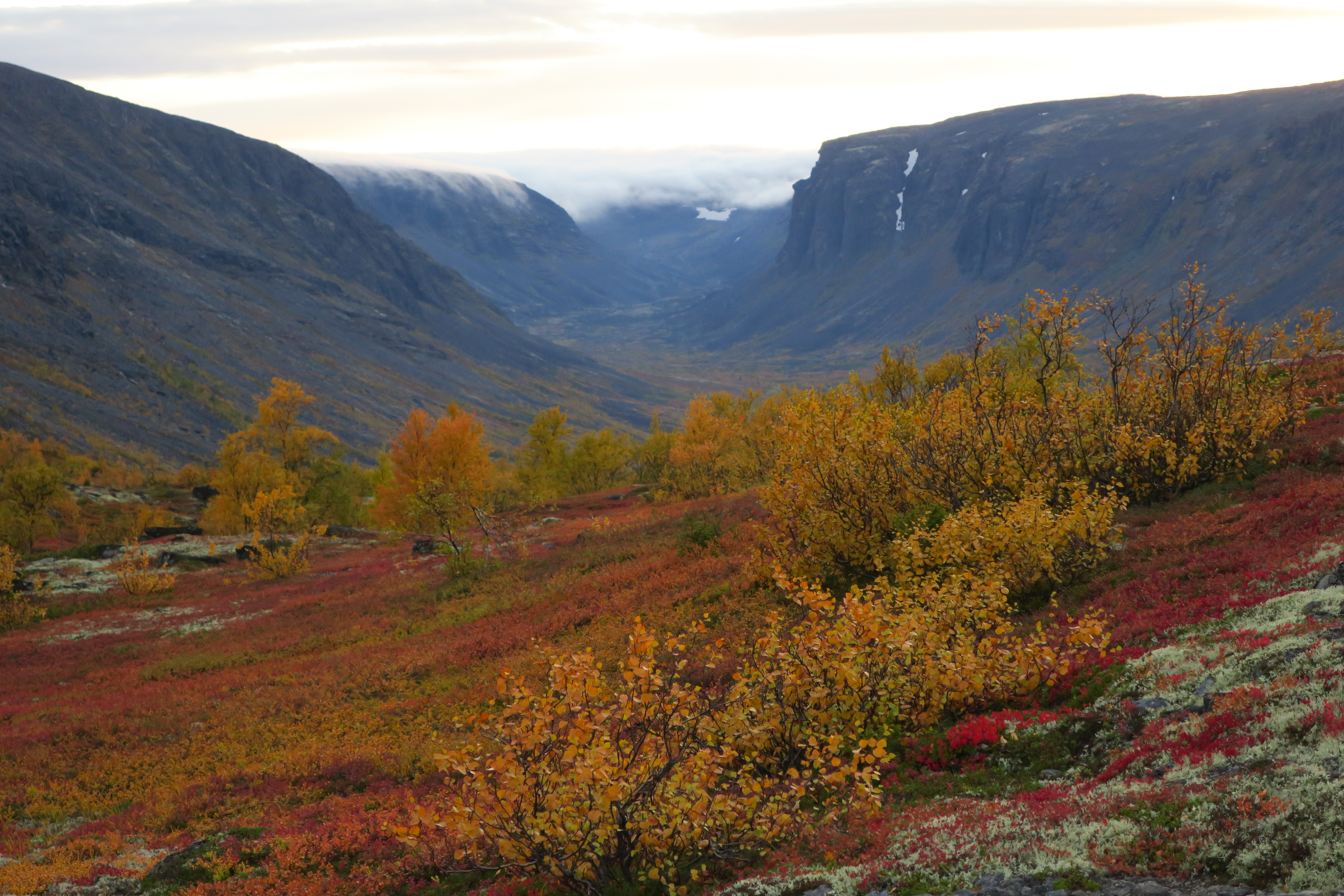
Chivruay River Valley near Saydozero Lake
