= Lamprophyllite =

Ti-silicate mineral

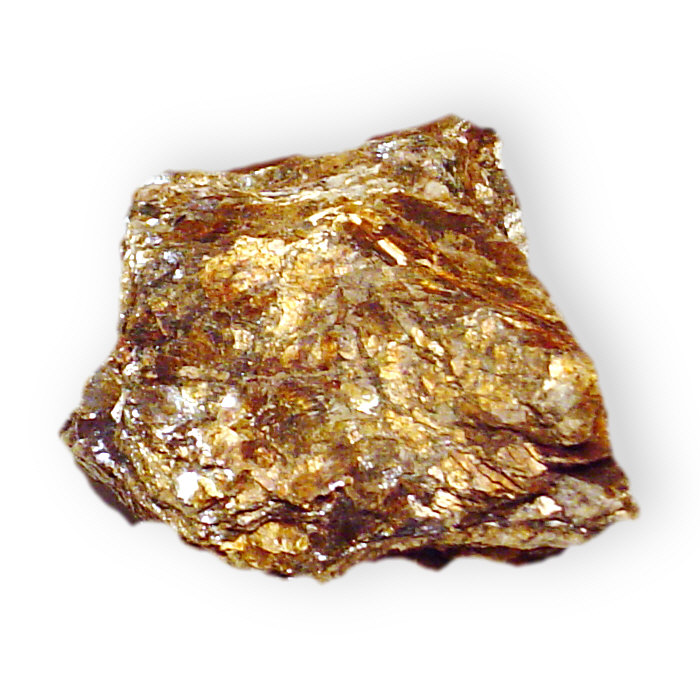

General
- Category: Silicate mineral
- IMA symbol: Lmp

Lamprophyllite (named for its lustrous cleavage) is a rare, but widespread mineral Ti-silicate mineral usually found in intrusive agpaitic igneous rocks. Yellow, reddish brown, Vitreous, Pearly.

Lamprophyllite formula is (Sr,Ba,K,Na)_{2}Na(Na,Fe,Mn)_{2}Ti[Ti_{2}O_{2}(Si_{2}O_{7})_{2}[(O, OH,F)_{2} . Full isomorphic range between lampropyllite and baritollalpropyllite exist.

The general crystal-chemical formula for lampropyllite-related minerals can be written as A2[(M1)(M2)2(M3)X2] [[5] L2(Si2O7)2O2], where the contents of the O and H sheets are given in square brackets in this order and A = Sr, Ba,K, Na; M1 = Na, Mn2+; M2 = Na, Mn2+, Fe2+, Ca; M3 = Ti, Mn2+, Mg, Fe3+, Fe2+; L = Ti, Fe3+; X = OH, O, F.

Lamprophyllite is monoclinic, The mineral also has an orthorhombic polytype Unit-cell parameters mainly depend from the cationic composition in the interlayer position A The crystal structures of the lamprophyllite-related minerals are based upon HOH modules consisting of a central octahedral O sheet sandwiched between two heteropolyhedral H sheets.

Lamprophyllite melts incongruently (880 °C) with formation of titanium oxides: rutile, tausonite, freudenbergite. Synthetic lamprophyllite synthesis was crystallized from melt. Newly formed lamprophyllite show higher Sr/Ba ratio than in equilibrium melt.

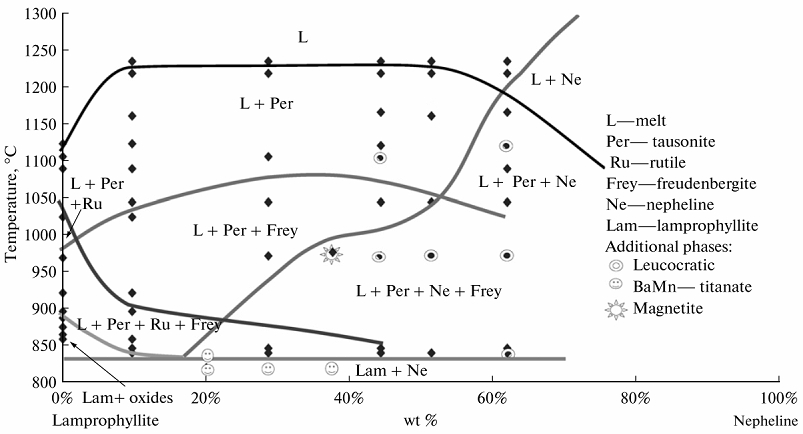
Pseudobinare phase diagram lamprophyllite-nepheline
