= Aegirine =

Member of the clinopyroxene group of inosilicate minerals

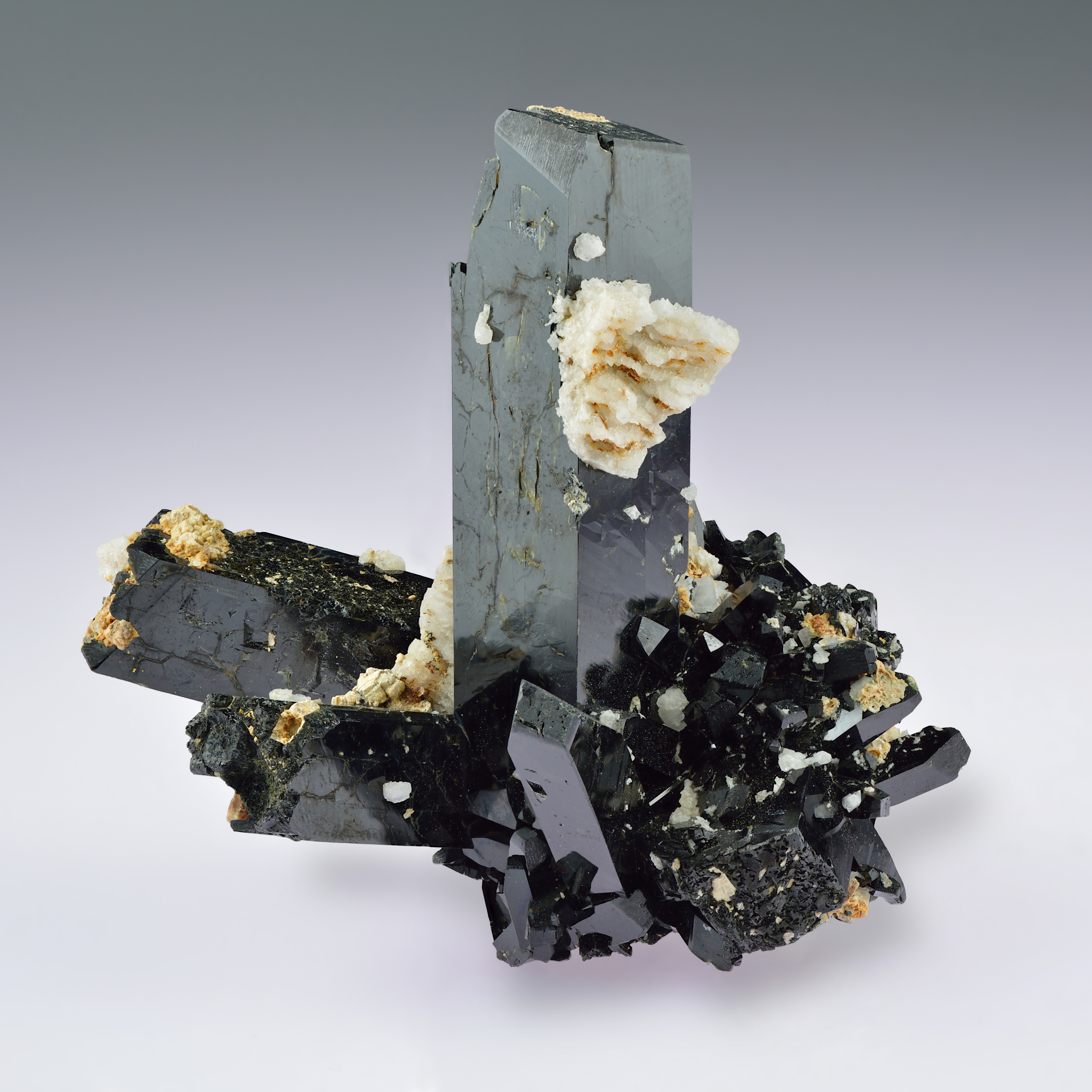
- Aegirine (dark) with minor feldspar (light) from Malawi

General
- Category: Silicate mineral, pyroxene
- Formula: NaFe^{3+}[Si_{2}O_{6}]
- IMA symbol: Aeg
- Strunz classification: 9.DA.25
- Crystal system: Monoclinic
- Crystal class: Prismatic (2/m) (same H-M symbol)
- Space group: C2/c
- Unit cell: a = 9.658, b = 8.795 c = 5.294 [Å], β = 107.42°; Z = 4

Identification
- Formula mass: 231.00 g/mol
- Color: Dark Green, Greenish Black
- Crystal habit: Prismatic crystals may be in sprays of acicular crystals, fibrous, in radial concretions
- Twinning: Simple and lamellar twinning common on {100}
- Cleavage: Good on {110}, (110) ^ (11̅0) ≈87°; parting on {100}
- Fracture: Uneven
- Tenacity: Brittle
- Mohs scale hardness: 6
- Luster: Vitreous to slightly resinous
- Streak: Yellowish-grey
- Diaphaneity: Translucent to opaque
- Specific gravity: 3.50–3.60
- Optical properties: Biaxial (−)
- Refractive index: n_{α} = 1.720 – 1.778 n_{β} = 1.740 – 1.819 n_{γ} = 1.757 – 1.839
- Birefringence: δ = 0.037 – 0.061
- Pleochroism: X = emerald green, deep green; Y = grass-green, deep green, yellow; Z = brownish green, green, yellowish brown, yellow
- 2V angle: Measured: 60° to 90°, Calculated: 68° to 84°
- Dispersion: moderate to strong r > v

Aegirine is a mineral. It is a member of the clinopyroxene group of inosilicate minerals. Acmite is a fibrous green-colored variety of aegirine, with the name also used as a synonym. It was first described in 1821, in Kongsberg, Norway.

== Etymology ==
The name aegirine is derived from Ægir , a Norse mythological figure (god of the sea), as the mineral was first described from Norway.

A synonym for the mineral is acmite (from Greek ἀκμή "point, edge") in reference to the typical pointed crystals.

== Chemistry and description ==
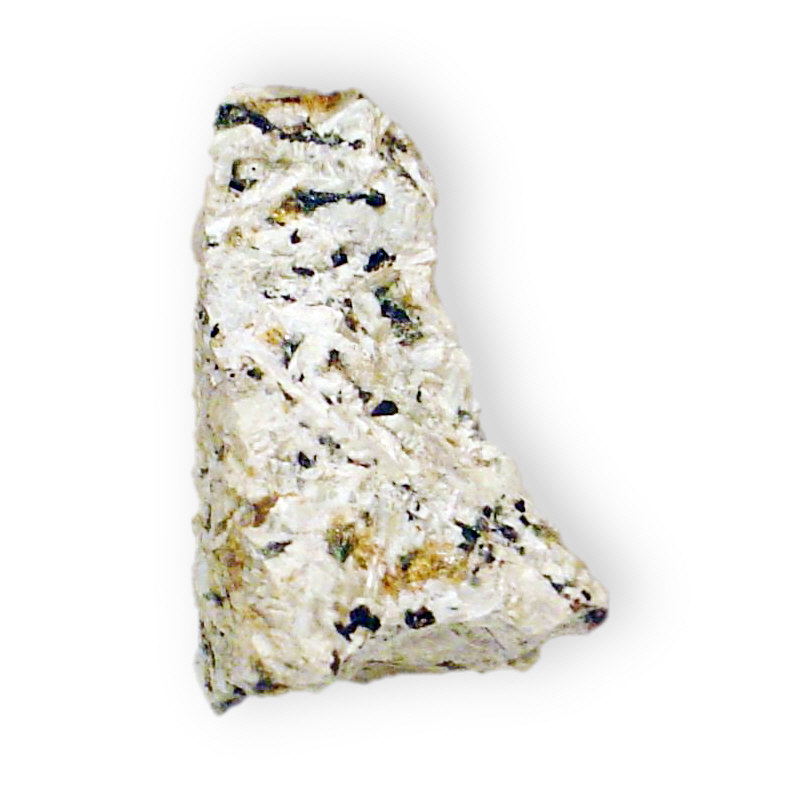
Syenite with aegirine and acmite from Magnet Cove, Arkansas, US

Aegirine is the sodium endmember of the aegirine–augite series.

It has the chemical formula NaFeSi_{2}O_{6}, in which the iron is present as the ion Fe^{3+}. In the aegirine–augite series, the sodium is variably replaced by calcium with iron(II) and magnesium replacing the iron(III) to balance the charge. Aluminum also substitutes for the iron(III). Acmite is a fibrous green-colored variety.

Aegirine occurs as dark green monoclinic prismatic crystals. It has a glassy luster and perfect cleavage, "in two directions at near 90 degree angles". It is described on Mindat.org as "slightly resinous", with its colour "dark green to greenish black, reddish brown, [or] black" Its Mohs hardness is 6 and its specific gravity is between 3.5 and 3.6.

Associated minerals include augite, nepheline, andradite, baryte, quartz, spessartine, riebeckite, biotite, sodalite, and albite.

== Occurrence ==
The acmite variety was first described in 1821, at Kongsberg, Norway, and the aegirine variety in 1835 for an occurrence in Rundemyr, Øvre Eiker, Buskerud, Norway.

This mineral commonly occurs in alkalic igneous rocks, nepheline syenites, carbonatites, and pegmatites. It also appears in regionally metamorphosed schists, gneisses, and iron formations; in blueschist facies rocks, and from sodium metasomatism in granulites. It may occur as an authigenic mineral in shales and marls. It occurs in association with potassic feldspar, nepheline, riebeckite, arfvedsonite, aenigmatite, astrophyllite, catapleiite, eudialyte, serandite, and apophyllite.

Major localities include Mont Saint-Hilaire, Quebec, Canada; Kongsberg, Norway; Narsarssuk, Greenland; Kola Peninsula, Russia; Magnet Cove, Arkansas, US; Kenya; Scotland, and Nigeria.

Aegirine also occurs in the syenite at the Bowral quarries in New South Wales, Australia, as described in a 1906 paper by geologist and later Antarctic explorer Douglas Mawson.

== Uses ==
Aegirine is sometimes used as a gemstone.

== See also ==
- List of minerals
