= Nepheline =

Silica-undersaturated aluminosilicate mineral

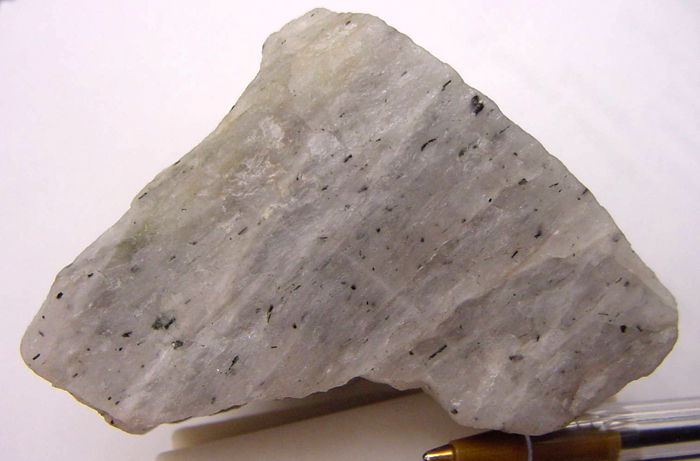

General
- Category: Tectosilicate minerals
- Group: Feldspathoid group
- Formula: (Na,K)AlSiO_{4}
- IMA symbol: Nph
- Strunz classification: 9.FA.05
- Crystal system: Hexagonal
- Crystal class: Pyramidal (6); H–M symbol: (6)
- Space group: P6_{3}

Identification
- Formula mass: 146.08 g/mol
- Color: White, gray, brown, brownish gray, or reddish white
- Crystal habit: Massive granular to prismatic
- Twinning: On [1010], [3365], and [1122]
- Cleavage: [1010] Poor
- Fracture: Subconchoidal
- Mohs scale hardness: 6
- Luster: Vitreous to greasy
- Streak: White
- Specific gravity: 2.55–2.65 (average: 2.59)
- Optical properties: Uniaxial (−)
- Refractive index: n_{ω} = 1.529–1.546 n_{ε} = 1.526–1.542
- Birefringence: δ = 0.003–0.004
- Other characteristics: Non-radioactive, non-magnetic, non-fluorescent

Nepheline (from Ancient Greek νεφέλη (nephélē) 'cloud'), also called nephelite, is a rock-forming mineral in the feldspathoid group – a silica-undersaturated aluminosilicate (Na_{3}KAl_{4}Si_{4}O_{16}) that occurs in intrusive and volcanic rocks with low silica, and in their associated pegmatites. It is used in glass and ceramic manufacturing and other industries, and has been investigated as an ore of aluminium.

== Description and properties ==
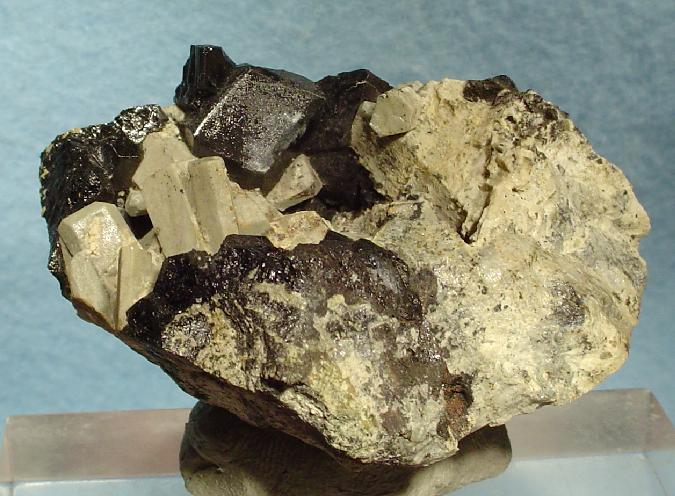
Grayish-white nepheline crystals with dark schorlomite from Bou-Agrao Mount, Tamazeght complex, High Atlas Mountains, Morocco. Size: 6.0 cm × 4.4 cm × 3.8 cm (2.4 in × 1.7 in × 1.5 in)

Nepheline crystals are rare and belong to the hexagonal system, usually having the form of a short, six-sided prism terminated by the basal plane. The crystals appear to have more symmetry than they actually possess, but unsymmetrical etched figures produced artificially on the prism faces indicate that the crystals are hemimorphic and tetartohedral, the only element of symmetry being a polar hexad axis. Nepheline is found in compact, granular aggregates, and can be white, yellow, gray, green, or reddish. Its hardness on the Mohs scale is 5.5 to 6, and its specific gravity 2.60–2.65. It is often translucent with a greasy luster.

The low index of refraction and the feeble double refraction in nepheline are nearly the same as in quartz; but since the sign of the double refraction is negative in nepheline, while it is positive in quartz, the two minerals are readily distinguished under the microscope. An important determinative character of nepheline is the ease with which it is decomposed by hydrochloric acid, with separation of gelatinous silica (which may be readily stained by coloring matters) and cubes of salt. For this reason, a clear crystal of nepheline becomes cloudy when immersed in acid.

The mineral is prone to alteration to zeolites (especially natrolite), sodalite, kaolin, or compact muscovite.

== Structure and composition ==
The aluminosilicate backbone of nepheline has a fairly open structure of interlocked six-member rings. This resembles the structure of tridymite, with aluminum substituting for every other silicon atom. This structure produces one nearly hexagonal interstitial site and three irregular interstitial sites per unit cell. In ideal nepheline, the hexagonal sites are occupied by potassium ions and the irregular sites by smaller sodium ions, yielding an atomic ratio of sodium to potassium of 3:1. This corresponds to an ideal weight percentage of K_{2}O of 8.1% The range of compositions seen in natural nepheline is 3% to 12% K_{2}O. Small amounts of calcium may be present as well.

At elevated temperature, nepheline forms a complete solid solution series with kalsilite, KAlSiO_{4}. At temperatures below about 1,000 °C (1,830 °F), there is a wide miscibility gap between nepheline and kalsilite, similar to the miscibility gap between microcline and albite. A composition falling in this gap will experience exsolution as it cools, where nepheline and kalsilite separate into separate microscopic layers (lamellae).

== Occurrence ==
Nephelinite is a rock-forming mineral found in silica-poor igneous rocks. These include nepheline syenite, foidite, and phonolite. It is often found along with leucite, sodalite, potassium feldspars, and sodium-rich plagioclase, amphiboles, or pyroxenes, but almost never in association with quartz. Notable outcrops of nepheline-bearing rocks are found on the Kola Peninsula; in Norway and South Africa; and at Litchfield, Maine; Magnet Cove, Arkansas; and Beemerville, New Jersey, in the United States. Syenites found near Bancroft, Ontario contain large deposits of high-purity nepheline.

Elaeolite (a name given by M. H. Klaproth 1809, from Greek words for oil [ἔλαιον] and stone [λίθος]; German: Fettstein) is a massive form of translucent nepheline with a darker color and greasy luster.

== Uses ==
Because of its high alumina content, iron-free nepheline is valued for use in glass manufacturing in place of feldspar. Most of the nepheline used for this purpose comes from Ontario. Nepheline produced as a byproduct of apatite mining in the Kola Peninsula has found uses in ceramics, leather, rubber, textiles, wood, and the oil industry. It can be used as a filler in paints, plastics, foam rubber, and sorbent. Nepheline of Kiya Shaltyr deposit (Kemerovo Region, Russia) is also used as a raw material for aluminium manufacturing.
