= Feklichevite =

Mineral of the eudialyte group

General
- Category: Cyclosilicate
- Formula: Na_{11}Ca_{9}(Fe^{3+},Fe^{2+})_{2}Zr_{3}Nb[Si_{25}O_{73}](OH,H_{2}O,Cl,O)_{5} (original form)
- IMA symbol: Fek
- Strunz classification: 9.CO.10
- Dana classification: 64.1.7.
- Crystal system: Trigonal
- Crystal class: Ditrigonal pyramidal (3m); H-M symbol: (3m)
- Space group: R3m
- Unit cell: a = 14.26, c = 30.17 [Å] (approximated); Z = 3

Identification
- Color: Dark brown
- Crystal habit: Isometric, thick-tabular; grains
- Cleavage: (001), perfect
- Tenacity: Brittle
- Mohs scale hardness: 5.5
- Luster: Vitreous
- Streak: Brownish
- Diaphaneity: Transparent or translucent
- Density: 2.87 (approximated)
- Optical properties: Uniaxial (+)
- Refractive index: nω = 1.61, nε = 1.61 (approximated)
- Pleochroism: None
- Ultraviolet fluorescence: No
- Common impurities: Mn, F

Feklichevite is a rare mineral of the eudialyte group with the formula Na_{11}Ca_{9}(Fe^{3+},Fe^{2+})_{2}Zr_{3}NbSi(Si_{3}O_{9})_{2}(Si_{9}O_{27})_{2}. The original formula was extended to show the presence of cyclic silicate groups and presence of silicon at the M4 site, according to the nomenclature of eudialyte group. When compared to other minerals of the group, feklichevite characterizes in the presence of ferric iron (thus similar to ikranite, mogovidite and fengchengite) and dominance of calcium at the N4 site. Calcium is ordered in the structure and is also present at the M1 site. Other iron-bearing minerals of the group are eudialyte, ferrokentbrooksite, georgbarsanovite, khomyakovite, labyrinthite, oneillite and rastsvetaevite, but they rather contain ferrous iron Feklichevite name honors Russian mineralogist and crystallographer, V. G. Feklichev.

== Occurrence and association ==
Feklichevite was found in cancrinite syenite vein of pegmatoid type, that occurs in the Kovdor alkaline massif, Kola Peninsula, Russia. Feklichevite coexists with aegirine-diopside, cancrinite, potassic feldspar, pectolite, titanite, hematite, and pyrrhotite.

== Notes on chemistry ==
Feklichevite has quite high admixtures of manganese and fluorine, with minor hafnium, strontium, titanium, cerium, and lanthanum.
