= Sulfate chloride =

Class of chemical compounds

Identifiers
3D model (JSmol)	Interactive image
PubChem CID	21918412
- InChI: InChI=1S/ClH.H2O4S/c;1-5(2,3)4/h1H;(H2,1,2,3,4)/p-3 Key: FZUJWWOKDIGOKH-UHFFFAOYSA-K
- SMILES: [O-]S(=O)(=O)[O-].[Cl-]
- Except where otherwise noted, data are given for materials in their standard state (at 25 °C [77 °F], 100 kPa). Infobox references

The sulfate chlorides are double salts containing both sulfate (SO^{2−}_{4}) and chloride (Cl^{−}) anions. They are distinct from the chlorosulfates, which have a chlorine atom attached to the sulfur as the ClSO^{−}_{3} anion.

Many minerals in this family exist. Many are found associated with volcanoes and fumaroles. As minerals they are included in the Nickel–Strunz classification group 7.DG.

The book Hey's Chemical Index of Minerals groups these in subgroup 12.2.

== List ==
name	formula	ratio	system	space group	unit cell	volume	density	optical	references
Arzrunite	Cu_{4}Pb_{2}(SO_{4})(OH)_{4}Cl_{6}·2H_{2}O (?)	1:6	orthorhombic					Blue Biaxial	
Connellite	Cu_{19}(SO_{4})(OH)_{32}Cl_{4}·3H_{2}O	1:4	hexagonal	P6̅_{2}c	a = 15.78 c = 9.10	1,962	3.36	blue Uniaxial (+) n_{ω} = 1.724 – 1.746 n_{ε} = 1.738–1.758 Birefringence: 0.026	
Potassium Zinc Sulfate Chloride	K_{2}Zn(SO_{4})Cl_{3} ?	1:3							
Chlorothionite	K_{2}Cu(SO_{4})Cl_{2}	1:2	orthorhombic	Pnma	a = 7.73 b = 6.07 c = 16.29	764	2.67	pale blue Biaxial (+)	
Sundiusite	Pb_{10}(SO_{4})O_{8}Cl_{2}	1:2	monoclinic		a = 24.67 b = 3.781 c = 11.881 β = 100.07	1091.1		Biaxial (+) n_{α} = 2.100 n_{γ} = 2.170 Max birefringence: δ = 0.070	
Sodium Potassium Iron Sulfate Chloride	(Na,K)_{2}Fe(SO_{4})Cl_{2}	1:2							
Mammothite	Pb_{6}Cu_{4}AlSb^{V}O_{2}(OH)_{16}Cl_{4}(SO_{4})_{2}	1:2	monoclinic	C2	a = 18.959 b = 7.3399 c = 11.363 β = 112.428(9)° Z=2	1461.6	5.21	blue-green Biaxial (+) n_{α} = 1.868 n_{β} = 1.892 n_{γ} = 1.928 2V:measured: 80° Birefringence: 0.060	
Zn Sulfate Chloride Hydroxide	Zn_{3}(SO_{4})(Cl,OH)_{2}	1:2							
Tatarskite	Ca_{6}Mg_{2}(SO_{4})_{2}(CO_{3})_{2}(OH)_{4}Cl_{4}·7H_{2}O	2:4	Orthorhombic				2.431	Biaxial (-) n_{α} = 1.567 n_{β} = 1.654 n_{γ} = 1.722 2V: 83°	
Therasiaite	(NH_{4})_{3}KNa_{2}Fe^{II}Fe^{III}(SO_{4})_{3}Cl_{5}	3:5	monoclinic		a = 18.284, b = 12.073, c = 9.535 Å, β = 108.10°, and Z = 4	V = 2000.6 Å^{3}		brown	
Acmonidesite	(NH_{4},K,Pb)_{8}NaFe^{II}_{4}(SO_{4})_{5}Cl_{8}	5:8	orthorhombic		a = 9.841 Å, b = 19.448 Å, c = 17.847 Å Z=4	3,415.70 Å^{3}			
'Ammonium-Kainite'	NH_{4}Mg(SO_{4})Cl·3H_{2}O	1:1							
Anhydrokainite	KMg(SO_{4})Cl	1:1							
Belousovite	KZnSO_{4}Cl	1:1	monoclinic	P2_{1}/c	a = 6.8904 b = 9.6115 c = 8.2144 β = 96.582 Z = 4	540.43			
Gordaite	NaZn_{4}SO_{4}(OH)_{6}Cl·6H_{2}O	1:1	trigonal	P3̅	a=8.35 c=13.08	802.67		Uniaxial (-) n_{ω} = 1.561 n_{ε} = 1.538 Max birefringence: δ = 0.023	
Kainite	KMgSO_{4}Cl·3H_{2}O	1:1	monoclinic		a = 19.72 b = 16.23 c = 9.53 β = 94.92°	3,039	2.15	Biaxial (-) n_{α} = 1.494 n_{β} = 1.505 n_{γ} = 1.516 2V: measured: 90°, calculated: 88° Max birefringence: δ = 0.022	
Spangolite	Cu_{6}AlSO_{4}(OH)_{12}Cl·3H_{2}O	1:1	trigonal	P31c	a = 8.24 c = 14.34 Z=2	843.2	3.14	blue-green Uniaxial (-) n_{ω} = 1.694 n_{ε} = 1.641 Max birefringence: δ = 0.053	
Thérèsemagnanite	NaCo_{4}SO_{4}(OH)_{6}Cl·6H_{2}O	1:1	trigonal	P3̅	a = 8.349 c = 13.031	786.6	2.52	Uniaxial (-) ω = 1.792 n_{ε} = 1.786 Max birefringence: δ = 0.006	
Vendidaite	Al_{2}(SO_{4})(OH)_{3}Cl·6H_{2}O	1:1	monoclinic	C2/c	a = 11.925 b = 16.134 c = 7.4573 β = 125.815°	1163.4	1.97	Biaxial (+) n_{α} = 1.522 n_{β} = 1.524 n_{γ} = 1.527 2V: calculated: 79° Max birefringence: δ = 0.005	
Xitieshanite	Fe^{III}SO_{4}Cl·6H_{2}O	1:1	monoclinic	P2_{1}/a	a = 14.102 b = 6.908 c = 10.673 β = 111.26° Z=4	968.97	1.99	Biaxial (+) n_{α} = 1.536 n_{β} = 1.570 n_{γ} = 1.628 2V: measured: 77°, calculated: 78° Max birefringence: δ = 0.092	
Zn Sulfate-Hydroxide-Chloride-Hydrate	Zn_{9}SO_{4})_{2}(OH)_{12}Cl_{2}·6H_{2}O	2:2	trigonal	R3̅	a = 8.275 c = 32.000 Z = 3	1,897.6			
Tzeferisite	Ca[Zn_{8}(SO_{4})_{2}(OH)_{12}Cl_{2}](H_{2}O)_{9}	2:2	trigonal	R3̅c	a = 8.3797 Å, c = 68.123 Z=6	4142.7			
UM1987-14-SO:ClHZn	Zn_{12}(SO_{4})_{3}Cl_{3}(OH)_{15}·5H_{2}O	3:3							
Aubertite	CuAl(SO_{4})_{2}Cl·14H_{2}O	2:1	triclinic	P1̅	a=6.28 b=13.23 c=6.28 α=91.17°, β=94.67°, γ=82.45°	515.50	1.815	blue Biaxial (-) n_{α} = 1.462 n_{β} = 1.482 n_{γ} = 1.495 2V: measured: 71° , calculated: 76° Max birefringence: δ = 0.033	
Magnesioaubertite	(Mg,Cu)Al(SO_{4})_{2}Cl·14H_{2}O	2:1	triclinic	P1̅	a = 6.31 b = 13.20 c = 6.29 α = 91.74°, β = 94.55°, γ = 82.62°	517.8		Biaxial (-) n_{α} = 1.466 n_{β} = 1.481 n_{γ} = 1.488 2V: measured: 112° to 114°, calculated: 66° Max birefringence: δ = 0.022	
Kamchatkite	KCu_{3}(SO_{4})_{2}OCl	2:1	orthorhombic	Pnma	a = 9.755 b = 7.015 c = 12.866	881.8	3.48	greenish-yellow Biaxial (+) n_{α} = 1.695 n_{β} = 1.718 n_{γ} = 1.759 2V: measured: 75° , calculated: 76° Max birefringence: δ = 0.064	
Aiolosite	Na_{4}Bi(SO_{4})_{3}Cl	3:1	hexagonal	P6_{3}/m	a = 9.626 c = 6.880	552.1	3.589	Uniaxial (+) n_{ω} = 1.590 n_{ε} = 1.600 Max birefringence: δ = 0.010	
Caracolite	Na_{3}Pb_{2}(SO_{4})_{3}Cl	3:1	monoclinic	P6_{3}/m	a = 19.62 b = 7.14 c = 9.81 β = 120°	1190	5.1	Biaxial (-) n_{α} = 1.743 n_{β} = 1.754 n_{γ} = 1.764 Max Birefringence: δ = 0.021	
D'Ansite	Na_{21}Mg(SO_{4})_{10}Cl_{3}	10:3	isometric	I4̅3d	a = 15.913 Z = 4	4,029.55	2.59	isotropic n=1.488	
D'Ansite-(Fe)	Na_{21}Fe^{II}(SO_{4})_{10}Cl_{3}	10:3	isometric	I4̅3d	a = 15.882 Z=4	4,006.04	2.62	Isotropic n = 1.51	
D'Ansite-(Mn)	Na_{21}Mn^{II}(SO_{4})_{10}Cl_{3}	10:3	isometric	I4̅3d	a = 15.929 Z=4	4,041.79	2.610	Isotropic n = 1.50	
Adranosite	(NH_{4})_{4}NaAl_{2}(SO_{4})_{4}Cl(OH)_{2}	4:1	tetragonal	I4_{1}/acd	a = 18.118, c = 11.320	3,715.9			
Adranosite-(Fe)	(NH_{4})_{4}NaFe^{III}_{2}(SO_{4})_{4}Cl(OH)_{2}	4:1	tetragonal	I4_{1}/acd	a = 18.261, c = 11.562 Z=8	3855.5		Uniaxial (-) n_{ω} = 1.580 n_{ε} = 1.570 Birefringence: δ = 0.010	
Bluelizardite	Na_{7}UO_{2}(SO_{4})_{4}Cl(H_{2}O)_{2}	4:1	monoclinic	C2/c	a = 21.1507 b = 5.3469 c = 34.6711 β = 104.913° Z=8	3788.91	3.116	yellow Biaxial (-) n_{α} = 1.515(1) n_{β} = 1.540(1) n_{γ} = 1.545(1) 2V: measured: 48°, calculated: 47.6° Max birefringence: δ = 0.030	
Piypite	K_{4}Cu_{4}O_{2}(SO_{4})_{4}·(Na,Cu)Cl	4:1	Tetragonal		a = 13.6 c = 4.95 Z=2	915.6	3.1	green Uniaxial (+) n_{ω} = 1.583 n_{ε} = 1.695 Max Birefringence:δ = 0.112	
Atlasovite	K(BiO)Cu_{6}Fe^{III}(SO_{4})_{5}O_{3}Cl	5:1	tetragonal	P4/ncc	a = 9.86, c = 20.58	2,001	4.2	Uniaxial (-) n_{ω} = 1.783 n_{ε} = 1.776 Birefringence: δ = 0.007	
Three or more anions
Marinellite	(Na,K)_{42}Ca_{6}(Al_{6}Si_{6}O_{24})_{6}(SO_{4})_{8}Cl_{2}·3H_{2}O	2:8	Trigonal	P31c	a = 12.88 c = 31.761	4563	2.405	Uniaxial (+) n_{ω} = 1.495 n_{ε} = 1.497 Max birefringence: δ = 0.002	
Philolithite	Pb_{12}O_{6}Mn_{7}(SO_{4})(CO_{3})_{4}Cl_{4}(OH)_{12}	1:4	Tetragonal		a = 12.627 c = 12.595 Z=2	2008.2		green Biaxial (+) n_{α} = 1.920 n_{β} = 1.940 n_{γ} = 1.950 Max birefringence: δ = 0.030	
Symesite	Pb_{10}(SO_{4})O_{7}Cl_{4}·H_{2}O	1:4	triclinic	P1̅	a = 8.821 b = 10.776 c = 13.134 α = 68.96°, β = 86.52°, γ = 75.65° Z=2	1128.4	7.3	pink Biaxial n_{α} = 2.120 n_{γ} = 2.160 Max birefringence: δ = 0.040	
Bobmeyerite	Pb_{4}(Al_{3}Cu)(Si_{4}O_{12})(S_{0.5}Si_{0.5}O_{4})(OH)_{7}Cl(H_{2}O)_{3}	1:2	Orthorhombic	Pnnm	a = 13.969 b = 14.24 c = 5.893 Z=2	1173.6	4.381	Biaxial (-) n_{α} = 1.756(4) n_{β} = 1.759(2) n_{γ} = 1.759(2) Max birefringence: δ = 0.003	
Microsommite	Na_{4}K_{2}Ca_{2}[Al_{6}Si_{6}O_{24}]SO_{4}Cl_{2}	1:2	Hexagonal		a = 22.08 c = 5.33	2,250		Uniaxial (+) n_{ω} = 1.521 n_{ε} = 1.529 Max birefringence: δ = 0.008	
Mattheddleite	Pb_{5}(SiO_{4})_{1.5}(SO_{4})_{1.5}(Cl,OH)	3:2	Hexagonal	P6_{3}/m	a = 10.0056, c = 7.496 Z=2	649.9	6.96	Uniaxial (-) n_{ω} = 2.017 n_{ε} = 1.999 Birefringence: δ = 0.018	
Afghanite	(Na,K)_{22}Ca_{10}[Si_{24}Al_{24}O_{96}](SO_{4})_{6}Cl_{6}	6:6	Trigonal		a = 12.796, c = 21.409 Z = 1	3,015.16	2.54	Uniaxial (+) n_{ω} = 1.523 n_{ε} = 1.529 δ = 0.006	
Alloriite	(Na,Ca,K)_{26}Ca_{4}(Al_{6}Si_{6}O_{24})_{4}(SO_{4})_{6}Cl_{6}	6:6	trigonal	P31c	a = 12.892 c = 21.340 Z=4	3,071.61	2.35	Uniaxial (+) n_{ω} = 1.497(2) n_{ε} = 1.499(2) Max birefringence: δ = 0.002	
Eztlite	Pb^{II}_{2}Fe^{III}_{3}(Te^{IV}O_{3})_{3}(SO_{4})O_{2}Cl	1:1	monoclinic	Cm	a = 11.466 b = 19.775 c = 20.52 β = 20.52° Z=2	2322.6	4.5	red Biaxial n_{α} = 2.140 n_{γ} = 2.150 Max birefringence: δ = 0.010	
Vlodavetsite	AlCa_{2}(SO_{4})_{2}F_{2}Cl·4H_{2}O	1:1	Tetragonal	I4/m	a = 6.870, c = 13.342 Z=2	629.70		Uniaxial (+) n_{ω} = 1.509 n_{ε} = 1.526 Birefringence: δ = 0.017	
Liottite	(Na,K)_{16}Ca_{8}[Al_{6}Si_{6}O_{24}]_{3}(SO_{4})_{5}Cl_{4}	5:4	Hexagonal		a = 12.84 c = 16.09	2,297		Uniaxial (-) n_{ω} = 1.530 n_{ε} = 1.528 Max birefringence: δ = 0.002	
Chlorellestadite	Ca_{10}(SiO_{4})_{3}(SO_{4})_{3}Cl_{2}	3:2	Hexagonal	P6_{3}/m	a = 9.6002 c = 6.8692 Z=2	548.27	3.091	Uniaxial (-) n_{ω} = 1.664 n_{ε} = 1.659 Max birefringence δ = 0.005	
Heidornite	Na_{2}Ca_{3}B_{5}O_{8}(SO_{4})_{2}Cl(OH)_{2}	2:1	monoclinic		a = 10.19 b = 7.76 c = 18.81 β = 93.33° Z=4	1,484.88	2.753	Biaxial (+) n_{α} = 1.579 n_{β} = 1.588 n_{γ} = 1.604 2V: measured: 63° to 77°, calculated: 76° Max birefringence: δ = 0.025	
Mineevite-(Y)	Na_{25}Ba(Y,Gd,Dy)_{2}(CO_{3})_{11}(HCO_{3})_{4}(SO_{4})_{2}F_{2}Cl	2:1	hexagonal	P6_{3}/m	a = 8.811 c = 37.03	2,489.6	2.85	Pale green Uniaxial (-) n_{ω} = 1.536 n_{ε} = 1.510 Max birefringence: δ = 0.026	
Sulphohalite	Na_{6}(SO_{4})_{2}FCl	2:1	Isometric	Fm3̅m	a = 10.065, Z = 4	1,019.6		isotropic n=1.455	
Tounkite	(Na,Ca,K)_{8}(Al_{6}Si_{6}O_{24})(SO_{4})_{2}Cl·H_{2}O	2:1	hexagonal		a = 12.84 c = 32.23	4,602		Uniaxial (+) n_{ω} = 1.528 n_{ε} = 1.543 Max birefringence: δ = 0.015	
Alloriite	Na_{19}K_{6}Ca_{5}[Al_{22}Si_{26}O_{96}](SO_{4})_{5}Cl(CO_{3})_{x}(H_{2}O)	5:1	trigonal	P31c	a = 12.892 c = 21.340				
Galeite	Na_{15}(SO_{4})_{5}F_{4}Cl	5:1	trigonal		a = 12.17 c = 13.94	1788		Uniaxial (+) n_{ω} = 1.447 n_{ε} = 1.449 Max birefringence: δ = 0.002	
Nabokoite	KCu_{7}(SO_{4})_{5}(Te^{IV}O_{3})OCl	5:1	Tetragonal		a = 9.84 Å, c = 20.52	1,986.86		n_{ω} = 1.778 n_{ε} = 1.773 uniaxial (-)	
Schairerite	Na_{21}(SO_{4})_{7}ClF_{6}	7:1	Trigonal		a = 12.17 c = 19.29	2,474	2.612	Uniaxial (+) n_{ω} = 1.440 n_{ε} = 1.445 Max birefringence: δ = 0.005	
Hanksite	Na_{22}K(SO_{4})_{9}(CO_{3})_{2}Cl	9:1	Hexagonal	P 6_{3}/m	a = 10.4896 c = 21.2415	2024.1			
Sacrofanite	[Na_{61}K_{19}Ca_{32}][Si_{84}Al_{84}O_{336}](SO_{4})_{26}Cl_{2}F_{6}·2H_{2}O	26:2	hexagonal	P6̅2c	a = 12.86 c = 72.24 Z=14	10,346	2.423	Uniaxial (-) n_{ω} = 1.505 n_{ε} = 1.486 Max birefringence:δ = 0.019	

=== Artificial ===
name	formula	ratio SO_{4}:Cl	system	space group	unit cell	volume	density	optical	references
'Ammonium-zinc-Kainite'	NH_{4}ZnSO_{4}Cl·3H_{2}O	1:1							
nonasodium tetrakis(sulfate) chloride diperhydrate	Na_{9}(SO_{4})_{4}Cl·2H_{2}O_{2}	4:1	tetragonal	P 4/n	MW=694.63 a=29.6829 b=29.6829 c=8.4018 Z=16	7402.6	2.493	colourless	
'zinc-Kainite'	KZn(SO_{4})Cl·3H_{2}O	1:1						n=1.24	
	Li_{2}RbSO_{4}Cl	1:1	orthorhombic	P2_{1}2_{1}2_{1}	a=4.8465 b=8.323 c=14.004 Z=4	564.0	2.714		
indium sulfate chloride	In_{2}(SO_{4})_{3}·InCl_{3}·(17±1)H_{2}O	3:3							
	Na_{3}Ca_{2}(SO_{4})_{3}Cl	3:1	hexagonal	P6_{3}/m					
	Na_{3}Ca_{2}(SO_{4})_{3}Cl	3:1	orthorhombic > 897 K						
	Na_{3}Cd_{2}(SO_{4})_{3}Cl	3:1	hexagonal	P6_{3}/m					
	Na_{3}Cd_{2}(SO_{4})_{3}Cl	3:1	monoclinic >494K						
	K_{3}Ca_{2}(SO_{4})_{3}Cl	3:1							
	K_{3}Pb_{2}(SO_{4})_{3}Cl	3:1							
	K_{4}Sb(SO_{4})_{3}Cl	3:1	noncentrosymmetric					non-linear optic high birefringence.	
Calcium chlorosulfatosilicate	Ca_{10}(SiO_{4})_{3}(SO_{4})_{3}Cl_{2}	3:2	hexagonal		a=9.688 c=6.849			monoaxial,(-) , N_{o} = 1.665, N_{e}' = 1.659	
	[Fe_{2}Al_{4}(OH)_{11}](SO_{4})_{3}Cl	3:1							
Lithium gordaite	LiZn_{4}(OH)_{6}(SO_{4})Cl·6H_{2}O	1:1			?c=17.84				
	NH_{4}SnClSO_{4}	1:1	monoclinic	P2_{1}/c	a=5.8628 b=4.6805 c=22.865 β=93.081° Z=4	525.54	2.844	colourless; birefringence: 0.1845@1064 nm	
	K_{3}Sn_{2}(SO_{4})_{3}Cl	3:1						stable to 440 °C	
	Rb_{3}Sn_{2}(SO_{4})_{2}Cl_{3}	2:3	monoclinic	C2/m	a=21.153 b=5.1751 c= 6.9327 β =95.844 Z=2	754.97	3.485	stable to 350 °C	
	NH_{4}SbCl_{2}SO_{4}	1:2	orthorhombic	P2_{1}2_{1}2_{1}	a=6.3616 b=7.3110 c=15.827 Z=2	736.13	2.768	colourless SHG 1.7×KDP	
	(NH_{4})_{2}SbCl(SO_{4})_{2}	2:1	orthorhombic	Pnma	a=8.6044 b=16.5821 c=7.1007 Z=2	1013.1	2.527	colourless	
	RbSbSO_{4}Cl_{2}	1:2	orthorhombic	P2_{1}2_{1}2_{1}	a=6.3469 b=7.4001 c=15.7798 Z=2	741.14	3.353	SHG 2.7×KDP	
	Cs_{3}Sn_{2}(SO_{4})_{2}Cl_{3}	2:3	monoclinic	C2/m	a=22.222 b=5.1992 c= 7.2661 β =97.030 Z=2	833.17	3.725	stable to 190 °C	
gadolinium chloride sulfate	GdClSO_{4}	1:1	monoclinic	P2_{1}/c	a = 9.437 6.5759 6.8005 β = 104.87 Z=4				
	[Hf_{18}O_{10}(OH)_{26}(SO_{4})_{12.7}(H_{2}O)_{20}]Cl_{0.6}·nH_{2}O		hexagonal	P6_{3}/m	a=33.924 c=17.3577 Z=6	17096	3.474		
	KBiCl_{2}SO_{4}	1:2	orthorhombic	P2_{1}2_{1}2_{1}	a= 7.2890 b=6.3673 c=15.3306 Z=4	711.51	3.875	band gap 3.95 eV	
	RbBiCl_{2}SO_{4}	1:2	orthorhombic	P2_{1}2_{1}2_{1}	a= 6.3352 b=7.4450 c=15.5302 Z=4	732.49	4.184	colourless NLO SHG	
	NH_{4}BiCl_{2}SO_{4}	1:2	orthorhombic	P2_{1}2_{1}2_{1}	a=7.3845 b=6.3593 c=15.5636 Z=4	730.87	3.581	colourless NLO SHG	
bismuth guanidinium dichloride sulfate	[C(NH_{2})_{3}]BiCl_{2}SO_{4}	1:2	triclinic	P1̅	a=6.4179 b=12.8984 c=12.9703 α=61.965° β=88.400° γ=76.935° Z=2	919.33	3.150	birefringence 0.143@546 nm	
Tripotassium dibismuth pentachloride dioxide disulfate	K_{3}Bi_{2}Cl_{5}O_{2}(SO_{4})_{2}	2:5	triclinic	P1̅	a=6.513 b=7.2500 c=10.7916 al=82.500 be=83.742 ga=82.100	485.89		band gap 3.62 eV	
	K_{4}[NpO_{2}(SO_{4})_{2}]Cl	2:1	monoclinic	P2/n	a=10.0873 b=4.5354 c=14.3518 β=103.383 Z=2	638.76	3.395	light green	
	Rb_{4}[NpO_{2}(SO_{4})_{2}]Cl	2:1	monoclinic	P2/n	a=10.5375 b=4.6151 c=16.068 β=103.184 Z=2	599.33	3.982	light green	
complexes
	[Pt_{2}(SO_{4})_{4}Cl(H_{2}O)]^{3−}	4:1							
	Hf(SO_{4})_{2}Cl^{−}	2:1							

Some "chloride sulfates" are sold as solutions in water and used for water treatment. These include ferric chloride sulfate and polyaluminium sulfate chloride. The solutions may also be called "chlorosulfates" even though they do not contain a chlorosulfate group.
