= Johnsenite-(Ce) =

Mineral of the eudialyte group

General
- Category: Cyclosilicate
- Formula: Na_{12}(Ce,La,Sr,Ca,[ ])_{3}Ca_{6}Mn_{3}Zr_{3}WSi(Si_{9}O_{27})_{2}(Si_{3}O_{9})_{2}(CO_{3})O(OH,Cl)_{2} (original form)
- IMA symbol: Jsn
- Strunz classification: 9.CO.10 (10 ed); 8/E.25-57 (8 ed)
- Dana classification: 64.1.2.7
- Crystal system: Trigonal
- Crystal class: Hexagonal scalenohedral (3̅m); H-M symbol: (3̅ 2m)
- Space group: R3̅m
- Unit cell: a = 14.24, c = 30.03 [Å] (approximated); Z = 3

Identification
- Color: Pale yellow to bright orange
- Crystal habit: Skeletal crystals (etched); aggregates
- Cleavage: None
- Fracture: Uneven
- Tenacity: Brittle
- Mohs scale hardness: 5–6
- Luster: Vitreous
- Streak: White
- Diaphaneity: Transparent or translucent
- Density: 3.24 (measured)
- Optical properties: Uniaxial (−)
- Refractive index: nω = 1.65, nε = 1.64 (approximated)
- Pleochroism: None

Johnsenite-(Ce) is a very rare mineral of the eudialyte group, with the chemical formula Na_{12}(Ce,La,Sr,Ca,[ ])_{3}Ca_{6}Mn_{3}Zr_{3}WSi(Si_{9}O_{27})_{2}(Si_{3}O_{9})_{2}(CO_{3})O(OH,Cl)_{2}. The original formula was extended to show the presence of both the cyclic silicate groups and silicon at the M4 site, according to the nomenclature of the eudialyte group. It is the third eudialyte-group mineral with essential tungsten (after khomyakovite and manganokhomyakovite), and second with essential rare earth elements (after zirsilite-(Ce), which is the niobium-analogue of johnsenite-(Ce)). In fact, some niobium substitutes for tungsten in johnsenite-(Ce). Other characteristic feature is the presence of essential carbonate group, shared with carbokentbrooksite, golyshevite, mogovidite and zirsilite-(Ce).

== Occurrence and association ==
Johnsenite-(Ce) was discovered in alkaline rocks of Mont Saint-Hilaire, Quebec, Canada, which is also a type locality for other eudialyte group species: oneillite, khomyakovite and manganokhomyakovite. The association of johnsenite-(Ce) is rich, as it includes aegirine, albite, amphibole-group mineral, burbankite-group mineral, calcite, catapleiite, cerite-(Ce), dawsonite, epididymite, fluorapophyllite, galena, microcline, molybdenite, natrolite, pectolite, pyrite, pyrrhotite, quartz, rhodochrosite, sphalerite, steacyite, stillwellite-(Ce), titanite, tuperssuatsiaite, zakharovite and zirsilite-(Ce).

== Notes on chemistry ==
Notable impurities in johnsenite-(Ce) are iron, titanium, niobium, yttrium, potassium, praseodymium, and neodymium. Traces of gadolinium, samarium, and hafnium are also reported.

== Notes on crystal structure ==
Johnsenite-(Ce) has four-layer structure.
