= Carbokentbrooksite =

Mineral

General
- Category: Silicate mineral, Cyclosilicate
- Formula: (Na,□)_{12}(Na,Ce)_{3}Ca_{6}Mn_{3}Zr_{3}Nb(Si_{25}O_{73})(OH)_{3}(CO_{3})·H_{2}O (original form)
- IMA symbol: Cktb
- Strunz classification: 9.CO.10 (10 ed); 8/E.25-32 (8 ed)
- Dana classification: 64.1.2.3
- Crystal system: Trigonal
- Crystal class: Ditrigonal pyramidal (3m) (same H-M symbol)
- Space group: R3m
- Unit cell: a = 14.24, c = 30.04 [Å]; Z = 3

Identification
- Color: Yellow, yellow-orange
- Crystal habit: rhombohedra (cores of zoned crystals)
- Cleavage: None
- Fracture: Conchoidal
- Tenacity: Brittle
- Mohs scale hardness: 5
- Luster: Vitreous
- Streak: White
- Diaphaneity: Transparent
- Density: 3.14 (measured)
- Optical properties: Uniaxial (−)
- Refractive index: nω = 1.65, nε = 1.64 (approximated)
- Pleochroism: None
- Ultraviolet fluorescence: No

Carbokentbrooksite is a very rare mineral of the eudialyte group, with formula (Na,□)_{12}(Na,Ce)_{3}Ca_{6}Mn_{3}Zr_{3}NbSiO(Si_{9}O_{27})_{2}(Si_{3}O_{9})_{2}(OH)_{3}(CO_{3})^{.}H_{2}O. The original formula was extended to show the presence of cyclic silicate groups and silicon at the M4 site, according to the nomenclature of eudialyte group. Carbokenbrooksite characterizes in being carbonate-rich (the other eudialyte-group species with essential carbonate are zirsilite-(Ce), golyshevite, and mogovidite). It is also sodium rich, being sodium equivalent of zirsilite-(Ce), with which it is intimately associated.

== Occurrence and association ==
Carbokentbrooksite and zirsilite-(Ce) are found as replacements of grains and crystals of eudialyte. They occur in pegmatites of Darai-Pioz alkaline massif, Tajikistan – a locality known for many rare minerals. The minerals are associated with aegirine, ekanite, microcline, polylithionite, quartz, stillwellite-(Ce) (silicates), pyrochlore-group mineral, fluorite, calcite, and galena.

== Notes on chemistry ==
Beside the elements given in the formula, carbokentbrooksite contains admixtures of lanthanum, strontium, neodymium, iron, yttrium, titanium, potassium, chlorine, and praseodymium. Carbokentbrooksite and zirsilite-(Ce) are chemically similar.

== Notes on structure ==
Carbokentbrooksite is isostructural with kentbrooksite.
