= Golyshevite =

Rare cyclosilicate mineral

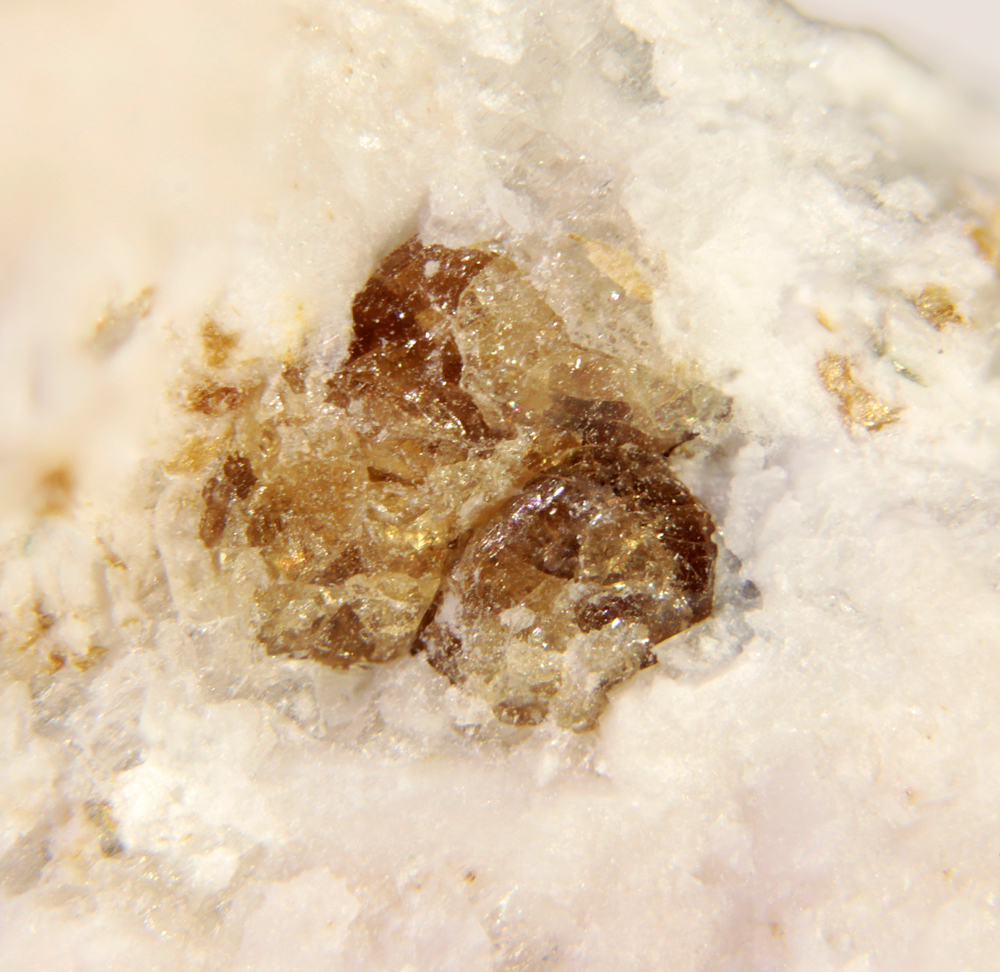
- Golyshevite crystals in matrix, some of them showing a pseudohexagonal section, with the typical yellowish-brown zircon-like colour. Locality: Kovdor Phlogopite Mine, Kovdor Massif, Northern Region, Russian Federation Size: 2.3 × 2.1 × 1.5 cm

General
- Category: Silicate mineral, cyclosilicate
- Formula: (Na,Ca)_{10}Ca_{9}(Fe^{3+},Fe^{2+})_{2}Zr_{3}NbSi_{25}O_{72}(CO_{3})(OH)_{3}·H_{2}O (original form)
- IMA symbol: Gsv
- Strunz classification: 9.CO.10
- Dana classification: 64.1.6
- Crystal system: Trigonal
- Crystal class: Ditrigonal pyramidal (3m) (same H-M symbol)
- Space group: R3m
- Unit cell: a = 14.23 c = 29.98 [Å] (approximated); Z = 3

Identification
- Color: Brown to reddish-brown
- Crystal habit: Grains and crystals
- Cleavage: No
- Tenacity: Brittle
- Specific gravity: 2.89 (measured)
- Optical properties: Uniaxial (−)
- Refractive index: nω = 1.62, nε = 1.61 (approximated)
- Pleochroism: Green to pale yellow

Golyshevite is a rare mineral of the eudialyte group, with the formula Na_{10}Ca_{3}Ca_{6}Zr_{3}Fe_{2}SiNb(Si_{3}O_{9})_{2}(Si_{9}O_{27})_{2}CO_{3}(OH)_{3}•H_{2}O. The original formula was extended to show both the presence of cyclic silicate groups and silicon at the M4 site, according to the nomenclature of the eudialyte group. The characteristic feature of golyshevite is calcium-rich composition, with calcium at two main sites instead of one site. Together with feklichevite, fengchengite, ikranite and mogovidite it is a ferric-iron-dominant representative of the group. It is chemically similar to mogovidite. Golyshevite was named after Russian crystallographer Vladimir Mikhailovich Golyshev.

== Occurrence and association ==
Golyshevite and mogovidite were found in calcium-bearing peralkaline pegmatites of the Kovdor massif, Kola Peninsula, Russia. Minerals associated with golyshevite are aegirine-augite, calcite, cancrinite, hedenbergite, orthoclase, pectolite, tacharanite, and thomsonite-Ca.

== Notes on chemistry ==
Impurities in golyshevite include chlorine, potassium, manganese, aluminium, cerium and lanthanum.

== Notes on crystal structure ==
Calcium in golyshevite is present at M(1) and N(4) sites.
