= Andrianovite =

Rare cyclosilicate mineral

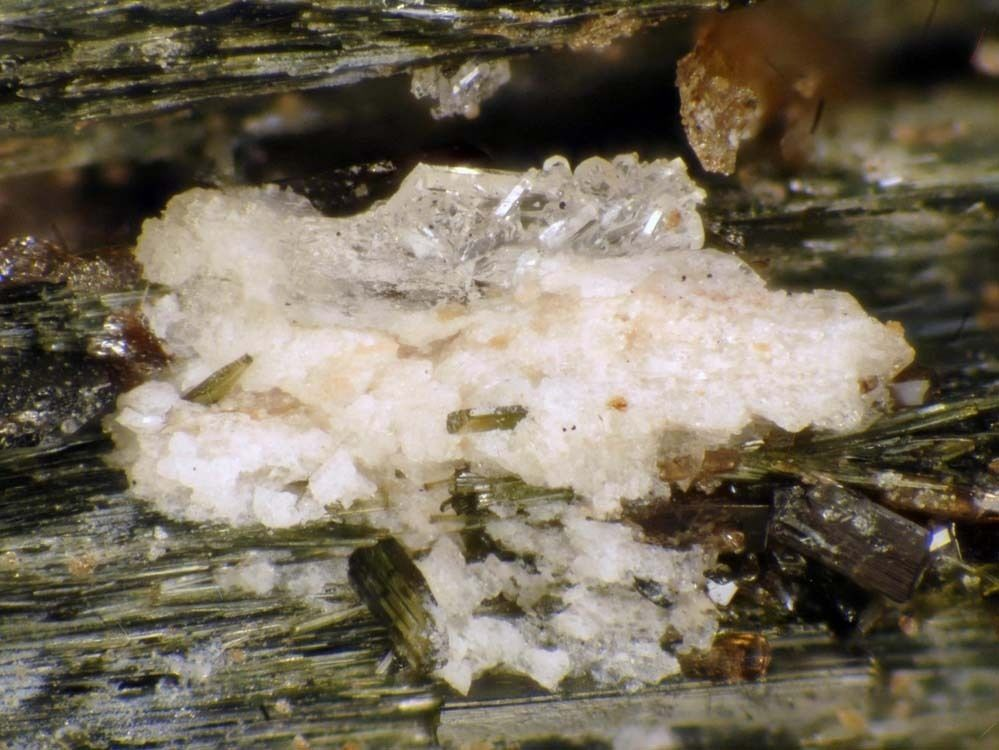
- Andrianovite found in Russia

General
- Category: Silicate mineral, Cyclosilicate
- Formula: Na_{12}(K,Sr,Ce)_{3}Ca_{6}Mn_{3}Zr_{3}Nb(Si_{25}O_{73})(O,H_{2}O,OH)_{5} (original form)
- IMA symbol: Adv
- Strunz classification: 9.CO.10
- Dana classification: 64.1.2.4
- Crystal system: Trigonal
- Crystal class: Ditrigonal pyramidal (3m); H-M symbol: (3m)
- Space group: R3m
- Unit cell: a = 14.28, c = 30.24 [Å] (approximated); Z = 3

Identification
- Color: Light yellow
- Crystal habit: intergrowths (rims) with eudialyte
- Cleavage: (001), imperfect
- Fracture: Step-like
- Tenacity: Brittle
- Mohs scale hardness: 5
- Luster: Vitreous
- Streak: White
- Diaphaneity: Transparent
- Density: 2.93 (measured), 3.02 (calculated)
- Optical properties: Uniaxial (−)
- Refractive index: nω = 1.62, nε = 1.62 (approximated)
- Pleochroism: None
- Ultraviolet fluorescence: No
- Common impurities: Sr, Ce, Fe

Andrianovite is a very rare mineral of the eudialyte group, with formula Na_{12}(K,Sr,Ce)_{6}Ca_{6}(Mn,Fe)_{3}Zr_{3}NbSi(Si_{3}O_{9})_{2}(Si_{9}O_{27})_{2}O(O,H_{2}O,OH)_{5}. The original formula was extended to show the presence of cyclic silicate groups and silicon at the M4 site, according to the nomenclature of eudialyte group. Andrianovite is unique among the eudialyte group in being potassium-rich (other eudialyte-group species with essential K are davinciite and rastsvetaevite). It is regarded as potassium analogue of kentbrooksite, but it also differs from it in being oxygen-dominant rather than fluorine-dominant. Also, the coordination number of Na in this representative is enlarged from 7 to 9. The name of the mineral honors Russian mathematician and crystallographer Valerii Ivanovich Andrianov.

== Occurrence and association ==
Andrianovite was discovered in pegmatites of Koashva open pit, Khibiny massif, Kola Peninsula. Russia. It coexists with aegirine, lamprophyllite, lomonosovite, microcline, mosandrite, natrolite, sodalite (silicates) and villiaumite.

== Notes on chemistry ==
The formula of andrianovite is devoid of some substituting elements and group, the most important being carbonate and chlorine. Minor substituting elements are lanthanum, neodymium, yttrium, titanium, barium, hafnium and aluminium.
