= Alloriite =

Feldspathoid mineral in the cancrinite subgroup

Alloriite [Aor]

General
- Category: Tectosilicate minerals
- Group: Feldspathoid group, cancrinite group
- Formula: Na_{5}K_{1.5}(Al_{6}Si_{6}O_{24})(SO_{4})(OH)_{0.5} * H_{2}O
- IMA symbol: Aor
- Strunz classification: 8/J.09-92
- Crystal system: Trigonal
- Crystal class: Ditrigonal Pyramidal-3m
- Space group: Trigonal
- Unit cell: a = 12.892(3) Å, c = 21.340(5) Å;

Identification
- Color: Colorless to pale violet
- Cleavage: Imperfect parallel to {1010}
- Mohs scale hardness: 5.0
- Luster: Vitreous
- Streak: White
- Specific gravity: 2.35
- Birefringence: δ = 0.002
- Melting point: 1540 °C

Alloriite is a silicate mineral that belongs to the cancrinite subgroup of the feldspathoid group. It is currently only found in Italy. It was discovered by and named for the Italian mineralogist Roberto Allori, an avid mineral collector who has also done research on piergorite and willhendersonite. The mineral appears as a crystal that is approximately 1.5 by 2 mm in length. The crystal grows as both tabular and prismatic crystals, and commonly occurs with sanidine, biotite, andradite, and apatite. It was approved of being a mineral in 2006 by the International Mineralogical Association. Afghanite is a cancrinite group mineral that is very similar to alloriite in both its chemical composition and its physical properties.

== Locations ==
Alloriite is a relatively rare mineral that only appears in Italy. Originally it was found in Mt. Cavalluccio, Italy. It was recorded with its volcanic ejecta, which is the result of an explosive volcanic eruption. It was found on the south eastern slope, in the northern part of the caldera, the result of a large volcanic explosion, which in turn created a crater.

The original sample was found within a volcanic bomb that was roughly 4.5 cm in diameter, with the crystals forming within the linings of miarolitic cavities.

== Composition ==
Alloriite is mainly composed of silicon dioxide (SiO_{2}) and aluminum oxide (Al_{2}O_{3}), its full chemical formula is Na_{5}K_{1.5}(Al_{6}Si_{6}O_{24})(SO_{4})(OH)_{0.5} * H_{2}O. This means that alloriite needs to be formed with the addition of water, while still in a volcanic environment. This explains why this mineral is formed only within Mt. Cavalluccio, which is known to have explosive eruptions due to the water content within its magmatic composition.

Alloriite's chemical composition was determined using an electron microprobe that measured the X-rays that were present in the sample after it was bombarded with an electron beam. Its water content was measured using the Penfield method, which only works on micro scaled samples. The carbon dioxide was determined using the contents on the ascarite sorbent, with selective sorption, held within a gaseous product. Then it was measured using the oxygen flux's glow to determine the composition.

Element Composition of Alloriite
Na2O	13.55%
K2	6.67%
CaO	6.23%
Al2O3	26.45%
SiO2	34.64%
SO3	8.92%
Cl	0.37%
H2O	2.1–0.2%
CO2	0.7–0.1%
[−0=Cl2]	[−0.08%]
Total	99.55%

== Structure ==
The mineral structure appears to be very similar to that of afghanite, except for the presence of strong H_{2}O bonds. The two minerals contains the same tetrahedron structure, and alloriite appears to follow the typical ABABACAC sequencing layer chain that is found in cancrinite grouped minerals. The A is Na, the B is H_{2} O, where in afghanite its A is Ca and the B is Cl.

Alloriite's crystal structure was found using a single crystal X-ray diffraction, which allowed mineralogists to classify it as a P31c for its point group, making it trigonal crystal structure.

In relation to afghanite's and alloriite's physical properties, they both have a trigonal crystal structure, P31c space group, and then have very similar formulas.

== Physical and optical properties ==
Alloriite is a small crystalline mineral that has only grown up to 1.5 to 2 mm in length and has been related to explosive volcanic building. The mineral appears as a colorless mineral that, that is semi transparent. When tested it has a white streak and a virtuous luster. It also appears to be brittle, even with a hardness of 5 on the Mohs hardness scale.

The mineral is optically positive and uniaxial, with a refractive index of ω = 1.497(2) and then ε = 1.499(2). Its X-ray powder pattern was discovered using an RKG-86 camera, and using molybdenum radiation, which led to α = 12.940(2)Å, c = 21.409(5)Å, and V = 3104.5(20)Å^{3}.

== See also ==
- List of minerals
- List of minerals named after people
