= Zirsilite-(Ce) =

Rare mineral of the eudialyte group

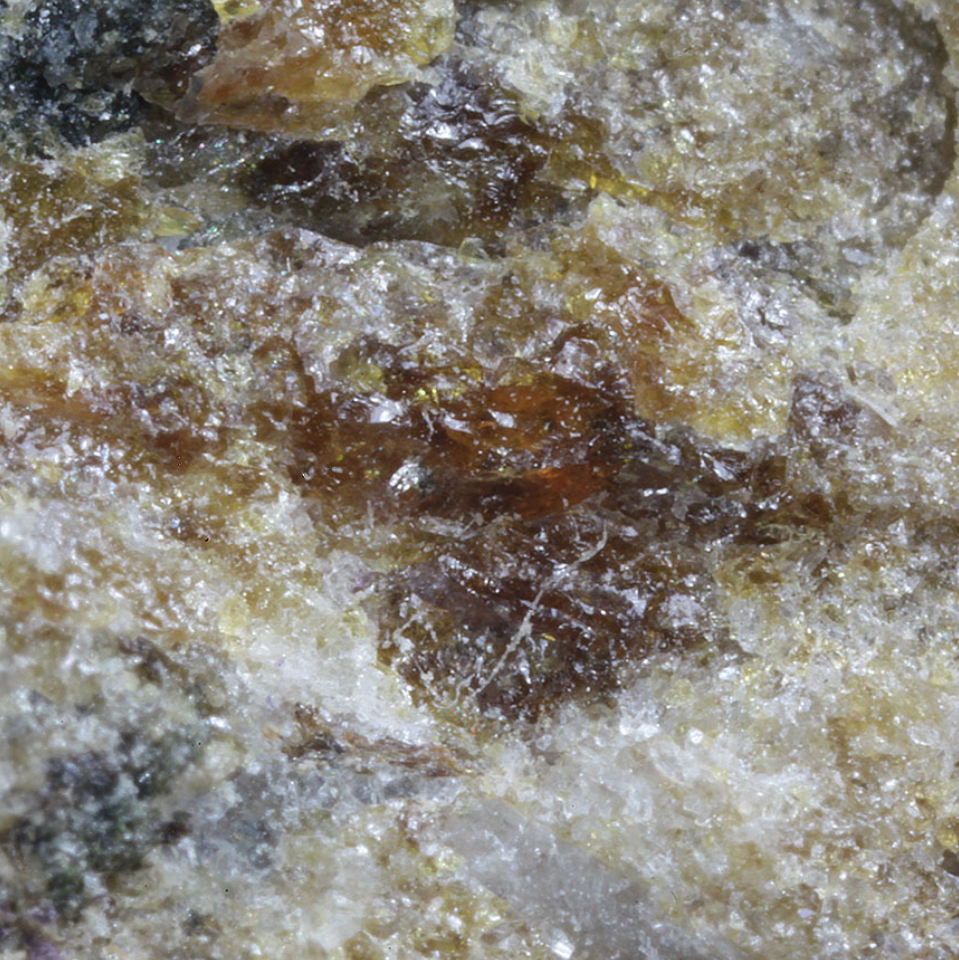

General
- Category: Cyclosilicate
- Formula: (Na,□)_{12}(Ce,Na)_{3}Ca_{6}Mn_{3}Zr_{3}Nb(Si_{25}O_{73})(OH)_{3}(CO_{3})·H_{2}O (original form)
- IMA symbol: Zir-Ce
- Strunz classification: 9.CO.10
- Dana classification: 64.1.5
- Crystal system: Trigonal
- Crystal class: Ditrigonal pyramidal (3m); H-M symbol: (3m)
- Space group: R3m
- Unit cell: a = 14.25, c = 30.08 [Å] (approximated); Z = 3

Identification
- Color: Creamy white
- Crystal habit: rhombohedra (rims of zoned crystals)
- Cleavage: None
- Fracture: Conchoidal
- Tenacity: Brittle
- Mohs scale hardness: 5
- Luster: Vitreous
- Streak: White
- Diaphaneity: Transparent
- Density: 3.15 (measured)
- Optical properties: Uniaxial (−)
- Refractive index: nω = 1.65, nε = 1.64 (approximated)
- Pleochroism: None
- Ultraviolet fluorescence: No

Zirsilite-(Ce) is a very rare mineral of the eudialyte group, with formula (Na,□)_{12}(Ce,Na)_{3}Ca_{6}Mn_{3}Zr_{3}NbSi(Si_{9}O_{27})_{2}(Si_{3}O_{9})_{2}O(OH)_{3}(CO_{3})·H_{2}O. The original formula was extended to show the presence of cyclic silicate groups and the presence of silicon at the M4 site, according to the nomenclature of the eudialyte group. Zirsilite-(Ce) differs from carbokentbrooksite in cerium-dominance over sodium only. Both minerals are intimately associated. The only other currently known representative of the eudialyte group having rare earth elements (in particular cerium, as suggested by the "-Ce)" Levinson suffix in the name) in dominance is johnsenite-(Ce).

== Occurrence and association ==
Zirsilite-(Ce) and carbokentbrooksite occur in pegmatites of Darai-Pioz alkaline massif, Tajikistan – a locality known for many rare minerals. They are found as replacements of grains and crystals of eudialyte. The minerals are associated with aegirine, ekanite, microcline, polylithionite, quartz, stillwellite-(Ce) (silicates), pyrochlore-group mineral, fluorite, calcite, and galena.

== Notes on chemistry ==
Beside the elements given in the formula, zirsilite-(Ce) contains admixtures of lanthanum, strontium, neodymium, iron, yttrium, titanium, potassium, chlorine, and praseodymium.

== Notes on structure ==
Zirsilite-(Ce) is isostructural with kentbrooksite.
