= Manganoeudialyte =

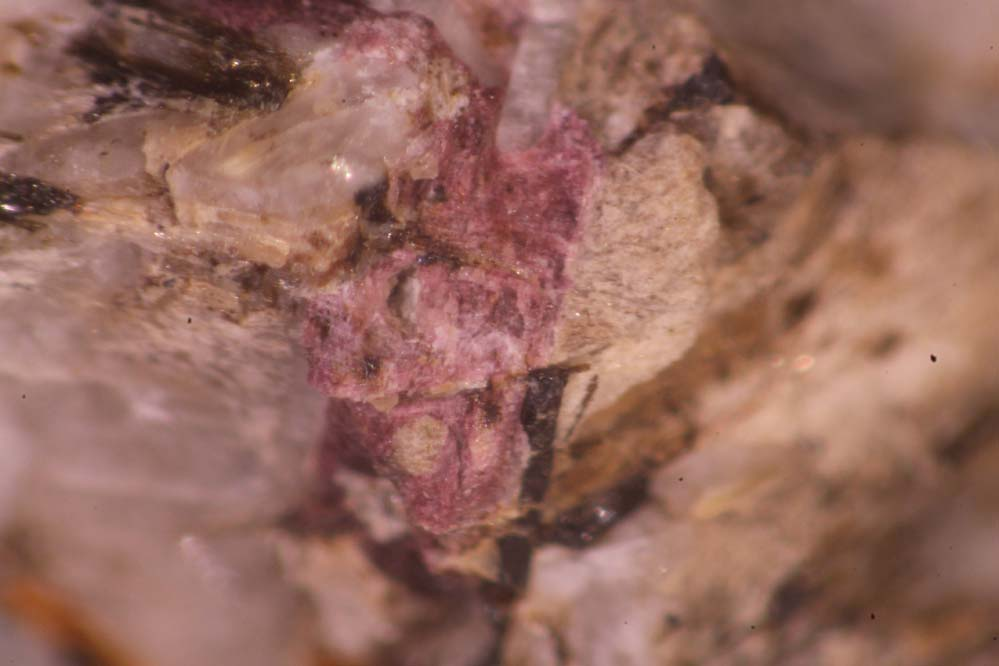
- Pink crystals and aggregates of the rare mineral manganoeudialyte (IMA 2009-039) from the type locality (Pedra Balao, Pocos de Caldas, Minas Gerais, Brazil).

General
- Category: Cyclosilicates
- Formula: Na_{14}Ca_{6}Mn_{3}Zr_{3}[Si_{26}O_{72}(OH)_{2}]Cl_{2}·4H_{2}O
- IMA symbol: Meud
- Crystal system: Trigonal
- Crystal class: Ditrigonal pyramidal (3m) (same H-M symbol)
- Space group: R3m
- Unit cell: a = 14.25, c = 30.08 [Å] (approximated); Z = 3

Identification
- Color: Pink to purple
- Crystal habit: interstitial patches
- Cleavage: None
- Fracture: Uneven
- Tenacity: Brittle
- Mohs scale hardness: 5–6
- Luster: Vitreous
- Streak: White
- Diaphaneity: Transparent or translucent
- Specific gravity: 2.89–2.94 (measured)
- Optical properties: Uniaxial (+)
- Refractive index: nω = 1.60 nε = 1.61 (approximated)
- Pleochroism: None

Manganoeudialyte is an moderately rare mineral of the eudialyte group, with formula Na_{14}Ca_{6}Mn_{3}Zr_{3}Si_{2}[Si_{24}O_{72}(OH)_{2}]Cl_{2}·4H_{2}O. The formula given is one of the forms that can be given, based on the originally reported one, and shows dominance of silicon at both the M3 and M4 sites. As suggested by its name, it is the manganese-analogue of eudialyte.

== Occurrence and association ==
Manganoeudialyte was discovered in khibinites of the Poços de Caldas massif, Brazil. Associated minerals are aegirine, analcime, astrophyllite, cancrinite, fluorite, lamprophyllite, nepheline, potassium feldspar, rinkite, sodalite, and titanite.

== Notes on chemistry ==
Impurities in manganoeudialyte include strontium, potassium, niobium, aluminium, fluorine, and minor hafnium, cerium, and lanthanum.
