= Eudialyte group =

Group of complex trigonal zircono- and titanosilicate minerals

Eudialyte group is a group of complex trigonal zircono- and, more rarely, titanosilicate minerals with general formula [N(1)N(2)N(3)N(4)N(5)]_{3}[M(1a)M(1b)]_{3}M(2)_{3}M(4)Z_{3}[Si_{24}O_{72}]O'_{4}X_{2}, where N(1) and N(2) and N(3) and N(5) = Na^{+} and more rarely H_{3}O^{+} or H_{2}O, N(4) = Na^{+}, Sr^{2+}, Mn^{2+} and more rarely H_{3}O^{+} or H_{2}O or K^{+} or Ca^{2+} or REE^{3+} (rare earth elements), M(1) and M(1b) = Ca^{2+}, M(1a) = Ca^{2+} or Mn^{2+} or Fe^{2+}, M(2) = Fe (both II and III), Mn and rarely Na^{+}, K^{+} or Zr^{4+}, M(3) = Si, Nb and rarely W, Ti and [] (vacancy), M(4) = Si and or rarely [], Z Zr^{4+} and or rarely Ti^{4+}, and X = OH^{−}, Cl^{−} and more rarely CO_{3}^{2−} or F^{−}. Some of the eudialyte-like structures can even be more complex, however, in general, its typical feature is the presence of [Si_{3}O_{9}]^{6−} and [Si_{9}O_{27}]^{18−} ring silicate groups. Space group is usually R3m or R-3m but may be reduced to R3 due to cation ordering. Like other zirconosilicates, the eudialyte group minerals possess alkaline ion-exchange properties, as microporous materials.

== List of the eudialyte-group minerals ==
=== Approved species ===
- Alluaivite - Na_{19}(Ca,Mn)_{6}(Ti,Nb)_{3}Si_{26}O_{74}Cl·2H_{2}O (space group R-3m)
- Andrianovite - Na_{12}(K,Sr,Ce)_{3}Ca_{6}Mn_{3}Zr_{3}NbSi(Si_{3}O_{9})_{2}(Si_{9}O_{27})_{2}O(O,H_{2}O,OH)_{5} (space group R3m)
- Aqualite – (H_{3}O)_{8}(Na,K,Sr)_{5}Ca_{6}Zr_{3}Si_{26}O_{66}(OH)_{9}Cl (space group R3)
- Carbokentbrooksite – (Na,[ ])_{12}(Na,Ce)_{3}Ca_{6}Mn_{3}Zr_{3}Nb(Si_{25}O_{73})(OH)_{3}(CO_{3})·H_{2}O (space group R3m)
- Davinciite – Na_{12}K_{3}Ca_{6}Fe^{2+}_{3}Zr_{3}(Si_{26}O_{73}OH)Cl_{2} (space group R3m)
- Dualite – Na_{30}(Ca,Na,Ce,Sr)_{12}(Na,Mn,Fe,Ti)_{6}Zr_{3}Ti_{3}Mn(Si_{51}O_{144})(OH,H_{2}O,Cl)_{9} (space group R3m)
- Eudialyte – Na_{15}Ca_{6}(Fe,Mn)_{3}Zr_{3}(Si_{3}O_{9})_{2}SiO(Si_{9}O_{27})_{2}(O,OH,H_{2}O)_{3}(OH,Cl)_{2} (space group R-3m)
- Feklichevite – Na_{11}Ca_{9}(Fe^{3+},Fe^{2+})_{2}Zr_{3}Nb[Si_{25}O_{73}](OH,H_{2}O,Cl,O)_{5} (space group R3m)
- Fengchengite – Na_{12}[ ]_{3}(Ca,Sr)_{6}Fe^{3+}_{3}Zr_{3}Si(Si_{25}O_{73})(H_{2}O,OH)_{3}(OH,Cl)_{2} (space group R-3m)
- Ferrokentbrooksite – Na_{15}Ca_{6}(Fe,Mn)_{3}Zr_{3}NbSi_{25}O_{73}(O,OH,H_{2}O)_{3}(Cl,F,OH)_{2} (space group R3m)
- Georgbarsanovite – Na_{12}(Mn,Sr,REE)_{3}Ca_{6}Fe_{3}Zr_{3}NbSi_{25}O_{76}Cl_{2}·H_{2}O (space group R3m)
- Golyshevite – (Na_{10}Ca_{3})Ca_{6}Zr_{3}Fe_{2}SiNb(Si_{3}O_{9})_{2}(Si_{9}O_{27})_{2}(OH)_{3}(CO_{3})·H_{2}O (space group R3m)
- Ikranite – (Na,H_{3}O)_{15}(Ca,Mn)_{6}Fe^{3+}_{2}Zr_{3−4}SiO(Si_{3}O_{9})_{2}(Si_{9}O_{27})_{2}·2− 3H_{2}O (space group R3m)
- Ilyukhinite – (H_{3}O,Na)_{14}Ca_{6}Mn_{2}Zr_{3}Si_{26}O_{72}(OH)_{2}·3H_{2}O – the most recent add (space group R3m)
- Johnsenite-(Ce) – Na_{12}(Ce,La,Sr,Ca)_{3}Ca_{6}Mn_{3}Zr_{3}WSiO(Si_{3}O_{9})_{2}(Si_{9}O_{27})_{2}(CO_{3})(OH,Cl)_{2}·H_{2}O (space group R3m)
- Kentbrooksite – (Na,REE)_{15}(Ca,REE)_{6}(Mn,Fe)_{3}Zr_{3}(Si_{3}O_{9})_{2}SiO(Si_{9}O_{27})_{2}(O,OH,H_{2}O)_{3}F_{2}·2H_{2}O) (space group R3m)
- Khomyakovite – Na_{12}Sr_{3}Ca_{6}Fe_{3}Zr_{3}(W,Nb)SiO(Si_{3}O_{9})_{2}(Si_{9}O_{27})_{2}(O,OH,H_{2}O)_{3}(OH,Cl)_{2} (space group R3m)
- Labyrinthite – (Na,K,Sr)_{35}Ca_{12}Fe_{3}Zr_{6}TiSi_{51}O_{144}(O,OH,H_{2}O)_{9}Cl_{3} (space group R3)
- Manganokhomyakovite – Na_{12}Sr_{3}Ca_{6}Mn_{3}Zr_{3}(W,Nb)SiO(Si_{3}O_{9})_{2}(Si_{9}O_{27})_{2}(O,OH,H_{2}O)_{3}(OH,Cl)_{2} (space group R3m)
- Manganoeudialyte – Na_{14}Ca_{6}Mn_{3}Zr_{3}[Si_{26}O_{72}(OH)_{2}]Cl_{2}·4H_{2}O (space group R3m)
- Mogovidite – Na_{9}(Ca,Na)_{5}Ca_{6}Zr_{3}Fe_{2}(SiNb)(Si_{3}O_{9})_{2}(Si_{9}O_{27})_{2}(CO_{3})(OH,H_{2}O)_{3}Cl_{0.3} (space group R3m)
- Oneillite – Na_{15}Ca_{3}Mn_{3}Fe^{2+}_{3}Zr_{3}Nb(Si_{25}O_{73})(O,OH,H_{2}O)_{3}(OH,Cl)_{2} (space group R3)
- Raslakite – Na_{15}Ca_{3}Fe^{2+}_{3}(Na,Zr)_{3}Zr_{3}(Si,Nb)SiO(Si_{3}O_{9})_{2}(Si_{9}O_{27})_{2}(OH,H_{2}O)_{3}(Cl,OH) (space group R3)
- Rastsvetaevite – Na_{27}K_{8}Ca_{12}Fe_{3}Zr_{6}Si_{52}O_{144}(O,OH,H_{2}O)_{6}Cl_{2} (space group R3m)
- Taseqite – Na_{12}Sr_{3}Ca_{6}Fe_{3}Zr_{3}NbSiO(Si_{3}O_{9})_{2}(Si_{9}O_{27})_{2}(O,OH,H_{2}O)_{3}Cl_{2} (space group R3m)
- Voronkovite – Na_{15}(Na,Ca,Ce)_{3}(Mn,Ca)_{3}Fe_{3}Zr_{3}Si_{26}O_{72}(OH,O)_{4}Cl·H_{2}O (space group R3)
- Zirsilite-(Ce) – (Na, [ ])_{12}(Ce,Na)_{3}Ca_{6}Mn_{3}Zr_{3}Nb(Si_{25}O_{73})(OH)_{3}(CO_{3})·H_{2}O (space group R3m)

=== Unnamed species ===
The list of eudialyte-related natural phases is growing. There are many such phases, some of them very complex, coded "UM" by the International Mineralogical Association, and include:

- UM-1971-22-SiO:CaClFeHMgMnNaNbZr – Na_{12}Ca_{5}(Ce,La,Y,Ca)Zr_{3}(Zr,Nb)(Fe,Mn)_{3}[Si_{9}O_{24−26}(OH)_{1−3}]·2(Si_{3}O_{9})_{2}Cl – with variable substitution of OH for oxygen
- UM1990-79-SiO:CaClFeHMnNaNbREEZr – Na_{14}Ca_{5}(Mg,Ca,Mn)Zr_{3}(Si_{3}O_{9})_{2}(Si_{9}O_{27})_{2}(Si,Nb,Al,Zr)_{2}(Fe,Zr)_{3}(Mn,Na,Ce,La,Y)(Na,H_{2}O,K,Sr)(OH)_{4−5}(OH,Cl) – first representative with magnesium-dominant site
- UM1990-80- SiO:CaFeHMnNaNbREEZr – Na_{14}Ca_{4}(Mn,Ca)_{2}Zr_{3}(Si_{3}O_{9})_{2}(Si_{9}O_{27})_{2}(Si,Nb,Al,Zr)_{2}(Fe,Mn,Al,Ti)_{3}(Na,Ce,La,Y,Mn)(Na,H_{2}O,K,Sr)(OH)_{7−8}
- UM1998-21-SiO:CaCeClHMnNaZr – Na_{16}Ca_{6}(Mn,Ce)_{3}Zr_{3}(Si_{3}O_{9})_{2}(Si_{9}O_{27})_{2}(OH,Cl)_{4}
- UM1999-36-SiO:CaCeHMnNaNbSrZr – Na_{17}Mn_{3}Ca_{2}Zr_{3}Si_{26}O_{72}(OH,F,Cl)_{4}
- UM2000-66-SiO:CaClFeHMnNaNbSrZr – Na_{12}(Ca,Mn)_{6}(Sr,Na,K)_{3}(Fe,Mn)_{3}(Zr,Nb)_{4}Si_{25}O_{66}(OH,Cl)_{11}
- UM2003-39- SiO:CaClFeHHfNaNbSrTaTiZr – Na_{12}(Na,K,Mn,Sr)_{2}Ca_{5}(Ca,Mn)(Zr,Hf)_{3}(Fe,[ ],Ta)_{3}(Si,Nb,W)(Si,Al,Ti)Si_{24}O_{72}(OH,O)_{33.5}Cl·1.2H_{2}O
- UM2004-51-SiO:CaClFFeHNaNbTi' – Na_{16}Ca_{6}(Fe,Mn)_{3}Zr_{3}(Ti,Nb)Si_{26}O_{72}FCl_{0.5}·nH_{2}O
- UM2006-17-SiO:CaClFFeHMnNaZr – Na_{15}(Ca_{3}Mn_{3})Zr_{3}(Fe,Zr)_{3}SiSi(Si_{3}O_{9})_{2}(Si_{9}O_{27})_{2}O_{2}(OH,F,Cl)_{3}·2H_{2}O
- UM2006-18-SiO:CaClFFeHMnNaZr – Na_{15}Ca_{3}(Mn,Fe)_{3}Zr_{3}(Zr,Na)_{3}(Si,Nb)(S,Ti,Si)(Si_{3}O_{9})_{2}(Si_{9}O_{27})_{2}(O,OH)_{5}(Cl,F,H_{2}O) – with essential sulfur and with Zr dominant in two sites
- UM2006-28-SiO:CaHMnNaZr – Na_{33}Ca_{12}Zr_{6}Mn_{3}(Mn,Nb,Ti)_{2}Si_{50}O_{132}(O,OH)_{12}(OH,H_{2}O,Cl)_{10} – with double c unit cell dimension

In addition, there is "eudialyte 3248": Na_{29}Ca_{12}Zr_{6}[Si_{48}O_{132}(O,OH)_{12}]{[Na]_{4}[Si]_{2}{[Mn]_{3}[Mn,Nb,Ti]_{2}}(OH,H_{2}O,Cl)_{10}, plus admixtures of Ce, Sr, Ba and Y, characterized by one S-dominant site (not shown in the simplified formula)

=== Other species ===
Rastsvetaeva et al. (2015) describe a species tentatively called "hydrorastsvetaevite", with a formula (Na_{11}(H_{3}O)_{11}K_{6}(H_{2}O)_{1.5}Sr)Ca_{12}Fe_{3}Na_{2}MnZr_{6}Si_{52}O_{144}(OH)_{4.5}Cl_{3.5}.
