= Taseqite =

General
- Category: Silicate mineral, cyclosilicate
- Formula: Na_{12}Sr_{3}Ca_{6}Fe_{3}Zr_{3}NbSi_{25}O_{73})(O,OH,H_{2}O)_{3}Cl_{2} (original form)
- IMA symbol: Tsq
- Strunz classification: 9.CO.10
- Crystal system: Trigonal
- Crystal class: Ditrigonal pyramidal (3m); H-M symbol: (3m)
- Space group: R3m
- Unit cell: a = 14.28, c = 30.02 [Å]; Z = 3

Identification
- Color: Dark- to yellowish-brown; lemon yellow
- Crystal habit: Thin tablets
- Cleavage: {0001}, fair
- Fracture: Conchoidal
- Tenacity: Brittle
- Mohs scale hardness: 5.5
- Luster: Vitreous
- Streak: Brownish-white
- Diaphaneity: Transparent
- Density: 3.24 g/cm^{3} (measured)
- Optical properties: Uniaxial
- Refractive index: nω = 1.64, nε = 1.65 (approximated)

Taseqite is a rare mineral of the eudialyte group, with chemical formula Na_{12}Sr_{3}Ca_{6}Fe_{3}Zr_{3}NbSiO(Si_{9}O_{27})_{2}(Si_{3}O_{9})_{2}(O,OH,H_{2}O)_{3}Cl_{2}. The formula given is derived from the original one and shows a separate silicon at the M4 site, basing on the nomenclature of the eudialyte group. Taseqite, khomyakovite and manganokhomyakovite are three group representatives with species-defining strontium, although many other members display strontium diadochy. Both strontium (^{N4}Sr) and niobium (^{M3}Nb) are essential in the crystal structure of taseqite. When compared to khomyakovite, taseqite differs in niobium- and chlorine-dominance.

== Occurrence and association ==
Taseqite's type locality is the Taseq slope located in the Ilimaussaq complex, Greenland – hence its name. At the type locality taseqite occurs in albitite veins, together with aegirine, analcime, catapleiite, ferrobustamite, hemimorphite, pectolite (silicates); ancylite-(La), calcite, dolomite, strontianite (carbonates); fluorapatite, and sphalerite. Taseqite was found also in Odichincha massif in association with nepheline, alkaline feldspar, aegerine and lamprophyllite.

== Notes on chemistry ==
Admixtures in taseqite include potassium and manganese, with traces of yttrium, cerium, hafnium, tantalum, and tin.

== Raman spectra ==
The Raman spectra of taseqite have features characteristic of other representatives of the eudialyte group. The most complex structure is observed in the range of 100–1200 cm^{−1}. Pronounced peaks are observed at 127 cm^{−1} (this peak is also present in the spectra of eudialyte and golyshevite) and 190 cm^{−1}; bands at close (but somewhat higher) frequencies were observed in the Raman spectra of eudialyte, manganoeudialyte, golyshevite, ferrokentbrooksite, and aqualite (at 205–207 cm^{−1}) and in the spectra of georgbarsanovite and raslakite (at 213–217 cm^{−1}). Thus, it is reasonable to suggest that the bands at 127 and 190 cm^{−1} are due to Na–O and Sr–O stretching vibrations, respectively. A superposition of bands of different widths is observed for taseqite in the range of 250–350 cm^{−1}; the intensities of these bands depend strongly on the orientation of the plane of polarization. The band at 270 cm^{−1} is comparable with that of the band at 272 cm^{−1}, which manifests itself as a peak in the spectrum of aqualite and as a shoulder in the georgbarsanovite spectrum; however, it is absent in the spectra of the other members of the eudialyte group. Other strong bands are observed at 285 and 310–326 cm^{−1} (the latter group can be put into correspondence with the strong peak observed in the golyshevite and georgbarsanovite spectra). All these bands, having a preferred polarization along the c axis, are most likely due to the out-of-plane bending vibrations of silicon‒oxygen rings. The weaker band at 387 cm^{−1} coincides with wide peaks in the oneillite and eudialyte spectra, it is observed as a weak peak in the georgbarsanovite spectrum.

In the range of 530–590 cm^{−1}, there is a strong band of complex shape, peaking at 560 cm^{−1} and having shoulders at 527 and 540 cm^{−1}. The band at 560 cm^{−1} was interpreted as a manifestation of the vibrations of (SiO_{3})_{n} rings, although the vibrations of Zr–O and Fe–O bonds can also be involved.

The characteristic peak at 605 cm^{−1} is comparable with the maximum at 612 cm^{−1} in the Raman spectrum of golyshevite. The wide peak in the vicinity of 700 cm^{−1} can be compared with that observed at 700–710 cm^{−1} in the spectra of almost all EGMs, except for aqualite. The absorption peak at 740 cm^{−1} is typical of many minerals, including oneillite and eudialyte; it is shifted in the spectra of golyshevite (747 cm^{−1}) and georgbarsanovite (751 cm^{−1}). The similar band in the IR spectra of EGMs is due to the bending vibrations of silicon‒oxygen rings, in which electric dipole moment oscillates mainly along the c axis [1]. This is confirmed by the preferred polarization of the Raman band at 740 cm^{−1} in the direction perpendicular to the c axis.

The frequency range 900–1150 cm^{−1}, corresponds to the Si–O stretching vibrations. The Raman spectrum of taseqite contains a complex band at 930 cm^{−1} with a shoulder at 900 cm^{−1} in this range. The bands in the ranges of 1000–1030 and 1070–1130 cm^{−1}, which are due to the vibrations of silicon‒oxygen rings, are assigned to the stretching vibrations of apical Si–O bonds and Si–O–Si bridges, respectively. The region of O–H stretching vibrations contains a weak peak of complex shape at 3632 cm^{−1}, with shoulders at 3660 and 3670 cm^{−1}, and a wide band in the range of 3400–3550 cm^{−1}, which is due to the water molecules forming relatively strong hydrogen bonds.
