= Manganokhomyakovite =

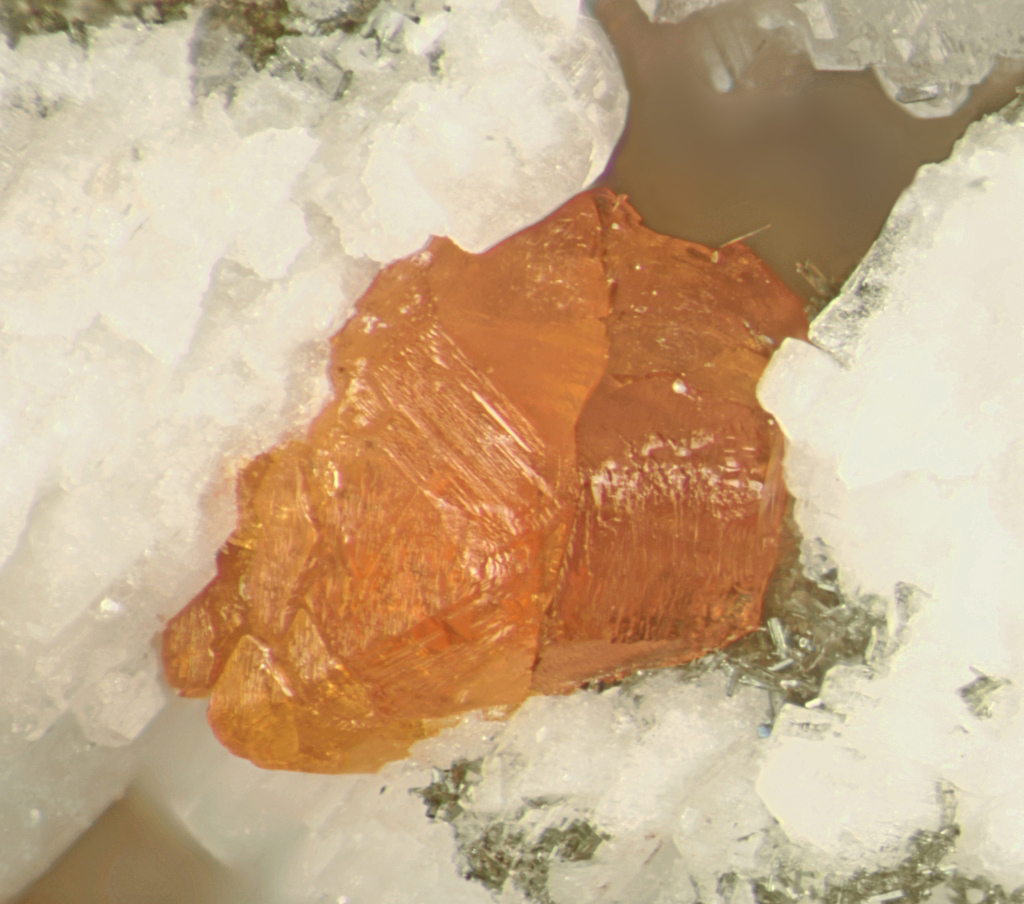
- Manganokhomyakovite

General
- Category: Cyclosilicates
- Formula: Na_{12}Sr_{3}Ca_{6}Mn_{3}Zr_{3}W(Si_{25}O_{73})(O,OH,H_{2}O)_{3}(OH,Cl)_{2} (original form)
- IMA symbol: Mkmy
- Strunz classification: 9.CO.10 (10 ed); 8/E.23-35 (8 ed)
- Dana classification: 64.1.2.6
- Crystal system: Trigonal
- Crystal class: Ditrigonal pyramidal (3m) (same H-M symbol)
- Space group: R3m
- Unit cell: a = 14.28, c = 30.12 [Å] (approximated); Z = 3

Identification
- Color: Orange to orange-red
- Crystal habit: Pseudo-octahedra
- Cleavage: None
- Fracture: Uneven
- Tenacity: Brittle
- Mohs scale hardness: 5–6
- Luster: Vitreous
- Streak: White
- Diaphaneity: Transparent to translucent
- Density: 3.13 (measured), 3.17 (calculated)
- Optical properties: Uniaxial (−)
- Refractive index: nω = 1.63, nε = 1.63 (approximated)
- Pleochroism: None

Manganokhomyakovite is a very rare mineral of the eudialyte group, with the chemical formula Na_{12}Sr_{3}Ca_{6}Mn_{3}Zr_{3}WSi(Si_{9}O_{27})_{2}(Si_{3}O_{9})_{2}O(O,OH,H_{2}O)_{3}(OH,Cl)_{2}. This formula is in extended form (based on the original one), to show the presence of cyclic silicate groups and domination of silicon at the M4 site, basing on the nomenclature of the eudialyte group. Some niobium substitutes for tungsten in khomyakovite. As suggested by its name, manganokhomyakovite is a manganese-analogue of khomyakovite, the latter being more rare. The two minerals are the only group representatives, beside taseqite, with species-defining strontium, although many other members display strontium diadochy. Manganokhomyakovite is the third eudialyte-group mineral with essential tungsten (after johnsenite-(Ce) and khomyakovite).

== Occurrence and association ==
Manganokhomyakovite, khomyakovite, johnsenite-(Ce) and oneillite are four eudialyte-group minerals discovered in alkaline rocks of Mont Saint-Hilaire, Quebec, Canada. Association of manganokhomyakovite is rich and includes: aegirine, albite, analcime, annite, kupletskite, microcline, natrolite, sodalite, titanite, wöhlerite, zircon, cerussite, galena, molybdenite, pyrite, pyrrhotite, and sphalerite.

== Notes on chemistry ==
Impurities in manganokhomyakovite include niobium and iron, with traces of rare earth elements, hafnium, titanium, tantalum, and aluminium.
