= Ferrokentbrooksite =

Mineral of the eudialyte group

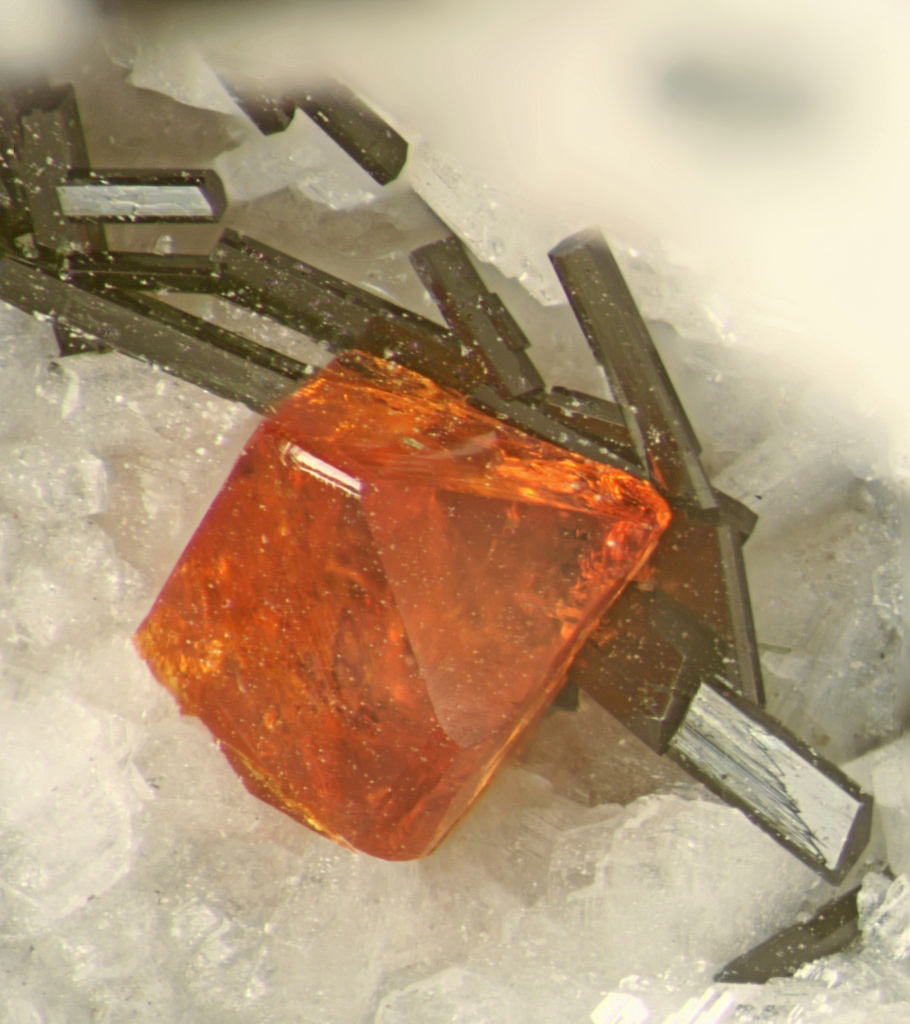
- Ferrokentbrooksite, Amphibole Supergroup-166795

General
- Category: Cyclosilicate
- Formula: Na_{15}Ca_{6}(Fe,Mn)_{3}Zr_{3}NbSi_{25}O_{73}(O,OH,H_{2}O)_{3}(Cl,F,OH)_{2} (original form)
- IMA symbol: Fktb
- Strunz classification: 9.CO.10 (10 ed); 8/E.23-15 (8 ed)
- Dana classification: 64.1.2.2
- Crystal system: Trigonal
- Crystal class: Ditrigonal pyramidal (3m); H-M symbol: (3m)
- Space group: R3m
- Unit cell: a = 14.25, c = 30.03 [Å] (approximated); Z = 3

Identification
- Color: Reddish brown to red
- Crystal habit: Pseudo-octahedra
- Cleavage: No
- Fracture: Uneven to conchoidal
- Luster: Vitreous
- Streak: White
- Diaphaneity: Transparent
- Refractive index: nω = 1.62, nε = 1.62 (approximated)
- Common impurities: REE (mainly Ce and Y), K, Sr

Ferrokentbrooksite is a moderately rare mineral of the eudialyte group, with formula Na_{15}Ca_{6}(Fe,Mn)_{3}Zr_{3}NbSi_{25}O_{73}(O,OH,H_{2}O)_{3}(Cl,F,OH)_{2}. The original formula was extended form to show the presence of cyclic silicate groups and presence of silicon at the M4 site, according to the nomenclature of eudialyte group. As suggested by its name, it is the (ferrous) iron analogue of kentbrooksite. When compared to the latter, it is also chlorine-dominant instead of being fluorine-dominant. The original (holotype) material is also relatively enriched in rare earth elements, including cerium and yttrium.

== Occurrence and association ==
Ferrokentbrooksite was discovered in Mont Saint-Hilaire, Quebec, Canada – a site wealth in rare alkaline minerals. At the site ferrokentbrooksite coexists with aegirine, albite, ancylite-(Ce), calcite, catapleiite, fluorite, fluorapatite, gonnardite, microcline, natrolite, nepheline, rhodochrosite, and serandite.

== Notes on chemistry ==
Beside fluorine, ferrokentbrooksite has admixtures of rare earth elements (including cerium, yttrium, lanthanum, neodymium and some gadolinium and samarium), potassium, strontium, and contains minor admixtures of titanium, hafnium, and tantalum.

== Notes on structure ==
Iron in ferrokentbrooksite has coordination number 5.
