= Fengchengite =

Mineral of the eudialyte group

General
- Category: Cyclosilicate
- Formula: Na_{12}[ ]_{3}(Ca,Sr)_{6}Fe_{3}^{3+}Zr_{3}Si(Si_{25}O_{73})(H_{2}O,OH)_{3}(OH,Cl)_{2}
- IMA symbol: Fcg
- Crystal system: Trigonal
- Crystal class: Hexagonal scalenohedral (3̅m); H-M symbol: (3̅ 2m)
- Space group: R3̅m
- Unit cell: a = 14.25, c = 30.03 [Å] (approximated)

Identification

Fengchengite is a rare mineral of the eudialyte group with the formula Na_{12}[ ]_{3}(Ca,Sr)_{6}Fe_{3}^{3+}Zr_{3}Si(Si_{25}O_{73})(H_{2}O,OH)_{3}(OH,Cl)_{2}. The formula is simplified as it does not show the presence of cyclic silicate groups. When compared to other minerals of the group, fengchengite characterizes in the presence of ferric iron (thus similar to ikranite, mogovidite and feklichevite) and essential, site-dominating vacancies. The mineral was discovered in the Saima complex near Fengcheng city in China – hence its name.
