= Sacrofanite =

Feldspathoid mineral in the cancrinite group

General
- Category: Tectosilicate minerals
- Group: Feldspathoid group, cancrinite group
- Formula: (Na,Ca)_{9}(Si,Al)_{12}O_{24}(SO_{4},CO_{3},OH,Cl)_{4}·n(H_{2}O)
- IMA symbol: Scf
- Strunz classification: 9.FB.05
- Crystal system: Hexagonal
- Crystal class: Ditrigonal dipyramidal (6̅m2); H-M symbol: (6̅m2)
- Space group: P6̅2c
- Unit cell: a = 12.86, c = 72.24 [Å] V = 10,346.52 Å^{3}; Z = 14

Identification
- Color: Colorless
- Cleavage: Perfect on {0001} {011̅0}
- Mohs scale hardness: 5 1/2 - 6
- Luster: Pearly to vitreous
- Streak: white
- Diaphaneity: Transparent
- Specific gravity: 2.423
- Optical properties: Uniaxial negative
- Refractive index: n_{ω} = 1.505, n_{ε} = 1.486 (both ± 0.001)
- Birefringence: 0.019

Sacrofanite is a rare silicate mineral that has the general formula of (Na,Ca)_{9}(Si,Al)_{12}O_{24}(SO_{4},CO_{3},OH,Cl)_{4}·n(H_{2}O). It was approved as a mineral by the International Mineralogical Association in 1980. Its name comes from the Sacrofano Caldera in the Monti Sabatini from which it was discovered in Latium, Italy.

== Structure and optical properties ==
It has a hexagonal crystal system, meaning crystallographically it has three horizontal axes of equal length that make an angle of 120° with their positive ends, with a long vertical axis running perpendicular to them. The mineral is anisotropic, meaning the velocity of light through a mineral will vary depending on the direction that the light is going. It has a moderate relief ranging from 1.486 to 1.505. It has a birefringence of 0.019, with birefringence being the decomposition of a light ray into two different rays when light hits a mineral. Sacrofanite is uniaxial negative, meaning it has one optic axis and that the index of refraction for the ordinary ray is greater than the index of refraction for the extraordinary ray.

== Occurrence ==
Sacrofanite is only found in the Sacrofano Caldera in Italy, yet it represents one of many new minerals found in Italian volcanoes. It can be found on display in The Mineralogical Museum at the University of Rome.

It occurs as a crystal coating within a vug in a rock ejected from the volcano. Other minerals occurring in the rock include sanidine, andradite, fassaite, leucite and hauyne.
