= Tzeferisite =

Sulfate mineral

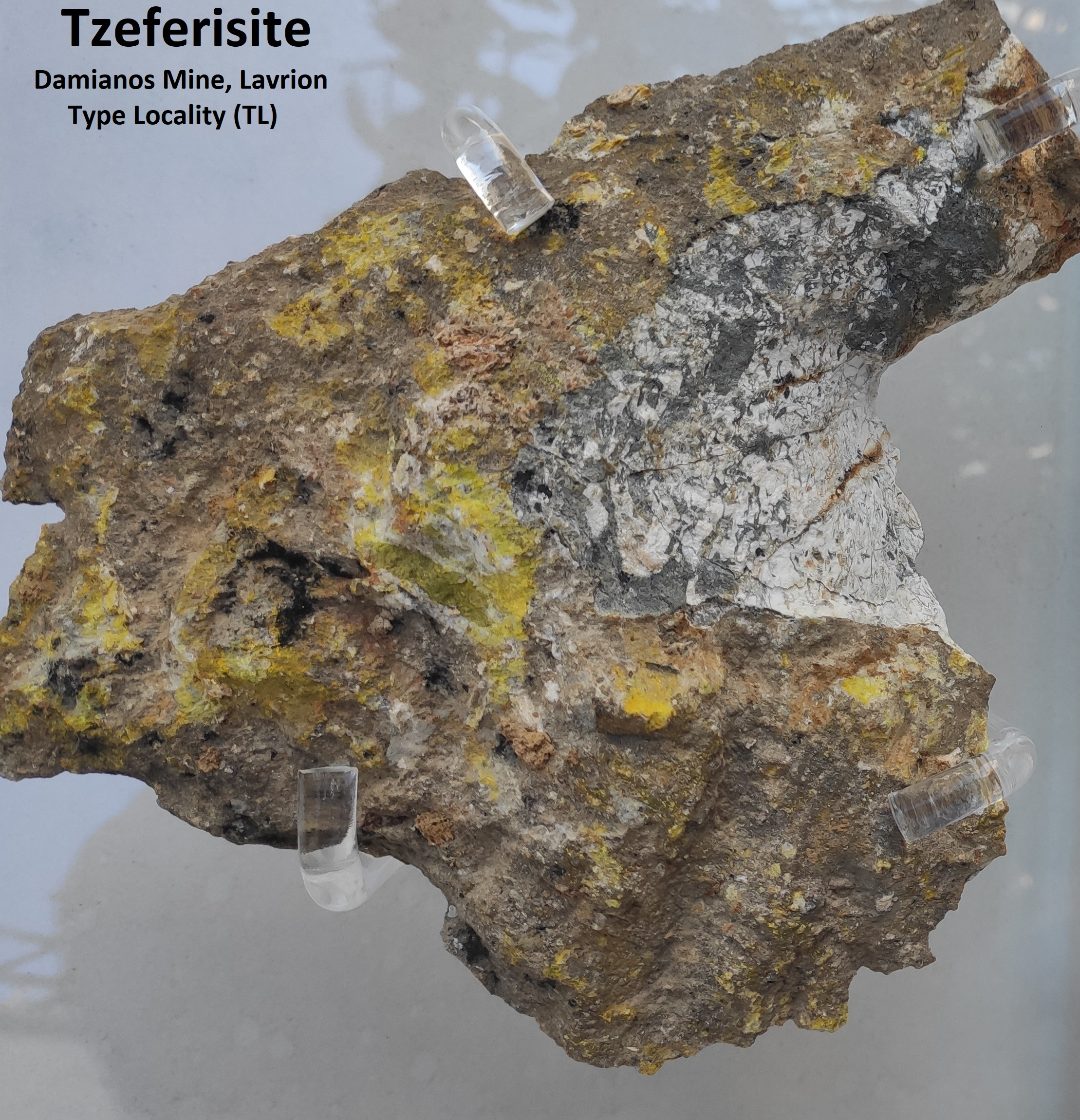
- Damianos Mine, Dimoliaki mines, Dimoliaki, Lavrion Mining District, Lavreotiki, East Attica, Attica, Greece (Lavrion Type locality)

General
- Category: Sulfate mineral
- Formula: CaZn_{8}(SO_{4})_{2}(OH)_{12}Cl_{2}(H_{2}O)_{9}
- IMA symbol: Τze
- Strunz classification: 7.DF.
- Crystal system: Trigonal
- Crystal class: 3m (3 2/m) - Hexagonal Scalenohedral
- Space group: R3c
- Unit cell: 4,112.46 Å^{3}

Identification
- Colour: White, colorless
- Lustre: Vitreous
- Diaphaneity: Transparent
- Other characteristics: Tzeferisite is not radioactive

Tzeferisite is a sulfate mineral with formula CaZn_{8}(SO_{4})_{2}(OH)_{12}Cl_{2}(H_{2}O)_{9}. Its type locality is Damianos Mine in Lavreotiki, East Attica, Attica, Greece.
