= Afghanite =

Tectosilicate mineral in the feldspathoid group

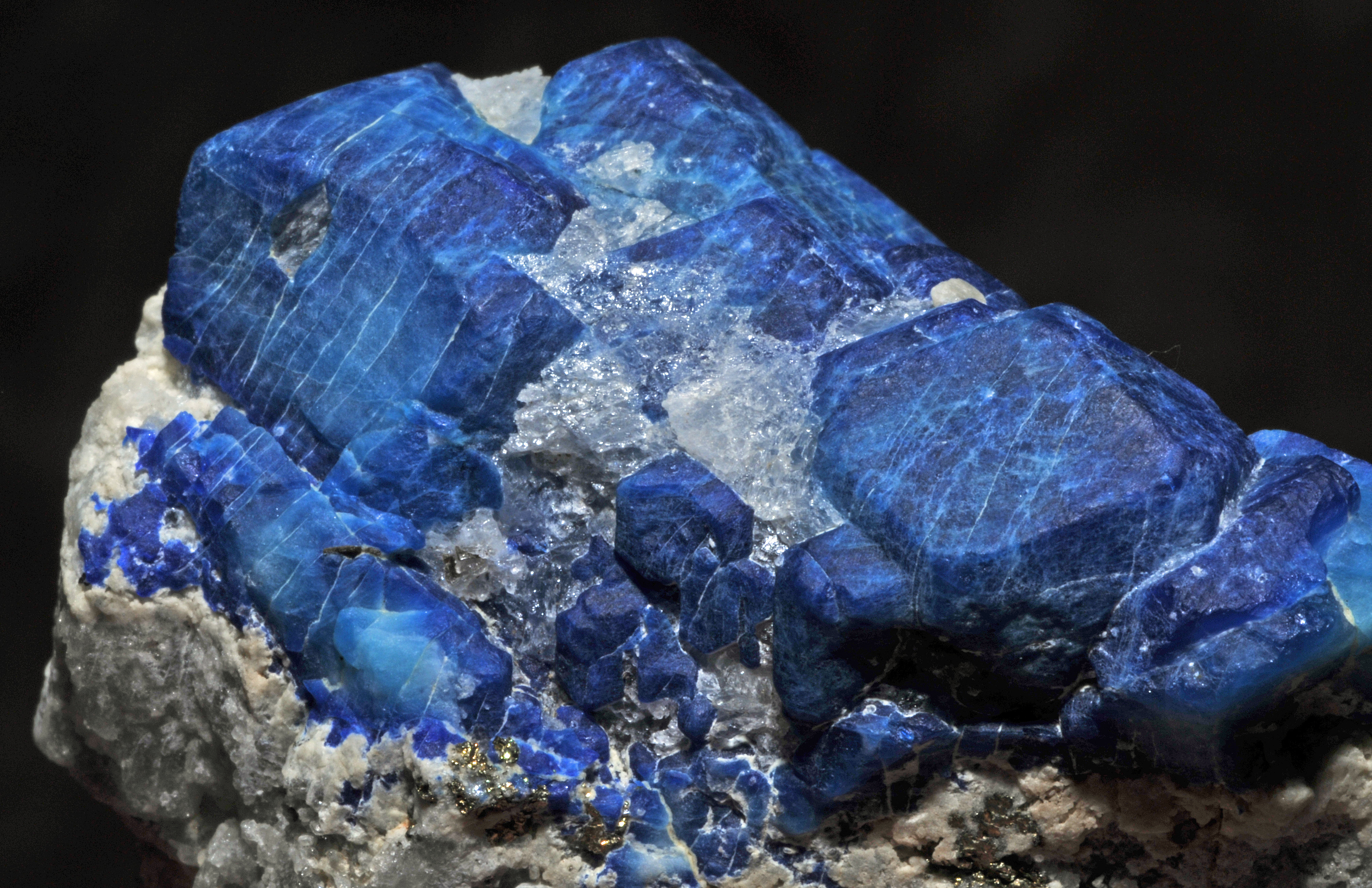
- Afghanite (light blue) with sodalite/lazurite (blue) coating

General
- Category: Tectosilicate minerals
- Group: Feldspathoid group, cancrinite group
- Formula: (Na,K)_{22}Ca_{10}[Si_{24}Al_{24}O_{96}](SO_{4})_{6}Cl_{6}
- IMA symbol: Afg
- Strunz classification: 9.FB.05
- Crystal system: Trigonal
- Crystal class: Ditrigonal pyramidal H-M symbol: (3m)
- Space group: P3c1
- Unit cell: a = 12.796, c = 21.409 [Å]; Z = 1

Identification
- Color: light blue, dark blue
- Crystal habit: elongated, bullet-like crystals with pointed ends
- Cleavage: Perfect {101̅0}
- Fracture: Conchoidal
- Mohs scale hardness: 5.5–6
- Luster: Vitreous
- Streak: white
- Diaphaneity: Transparent
- Specific gravity: 2.55–2.65
- Optical properties: Uniaxial (+)
- Refractive index: n_{ω} = 1.523 n_{ε} = 1.529
- Birefringence: δ = 0.006
- Other characteristics: Radioactive 2.28% (K)

Afghanite, (Na,K)_{22}Ca_{10}[Si_{24}Al_{24}O_{96}](SO_{4})_{6}Cl_{6}, is a hydrous sodium, calcium, potassium, sulfate, chloride, carbonate alumino-silicate mineral. Afghanite is a feldspathoid of the cancrinite group and typically occurs with sodalite group minerals. It forms blue to colorless, typically massive crystals in the trigonal crystal system. The lowering of the symmetry from typical (for cancrinite group) hexagonal one is due to ordering of Si and Al. It has a Mohs hardness of 5.5 to 6 and a specific gravity of 2.55 to 2.65. It has refractive index values of nω = 1.523 and nε = 1.529. It has one direction of perfect cleavage and exhibits conchoidal fracture. It fluoresces a bright orange.

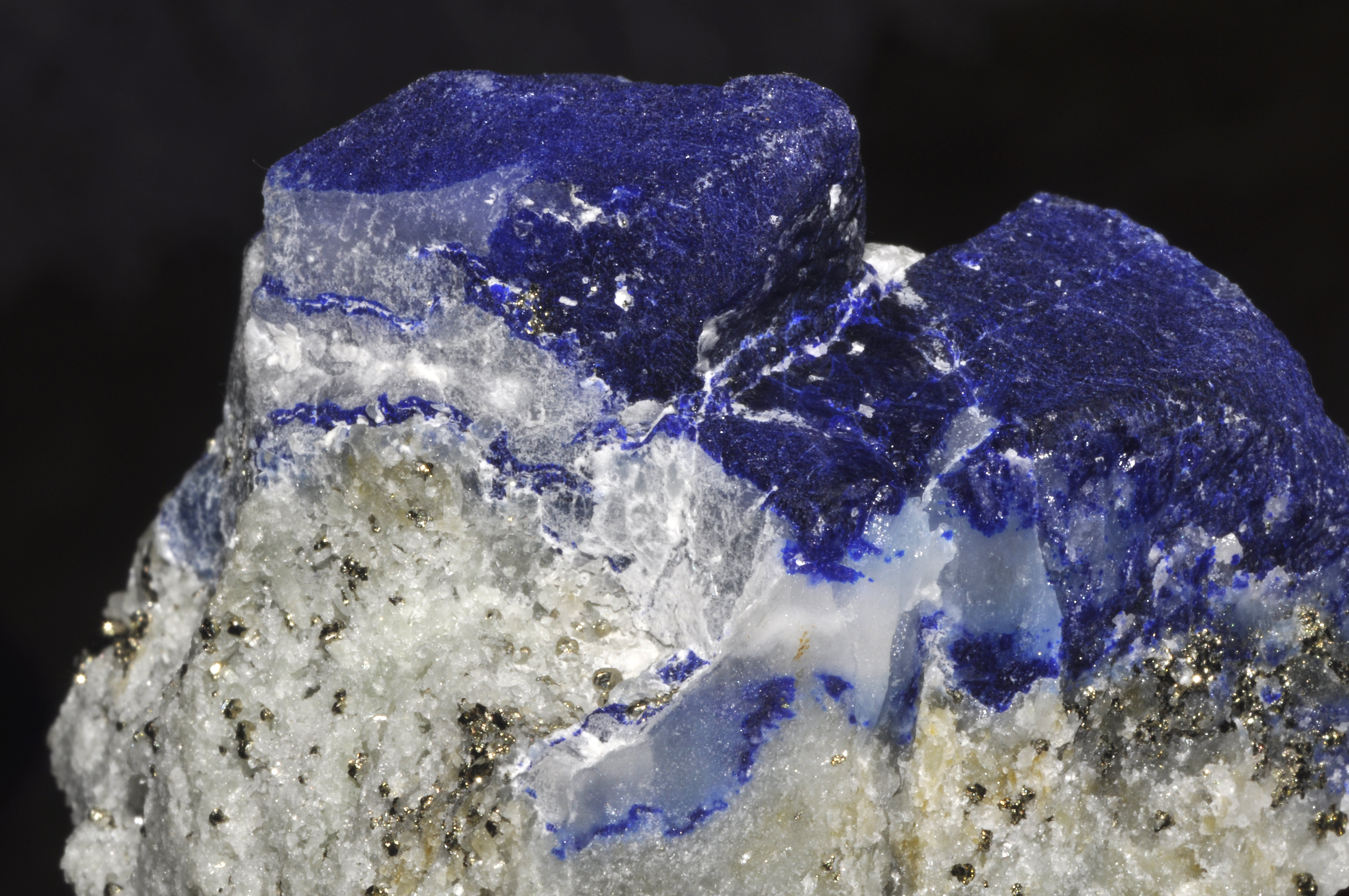
Afghanite (light blue) with lazurite (blue) coating

It was discovered in 1968 in the Lapis-lazuli Mine, Sar-i Sang, Badakhshan Province, Afghanistan and takes its name from that country. It has also been described from localities in Germany, Italy, the Pamir Mountains of Tajikistan, near Lake Baikal in Siberia, New York and Newfoundland. It occurs as veinlets in lazurite crystals in the Afghan location and in altered limestone xenoliths within pumice in Pitigliano, Tuscany, Italy.

It is used as a gemstone.

== See also ==
- List of gemstones
- List of minerals
