= Georgbarsanovite =

Mineral of the eudialyte group

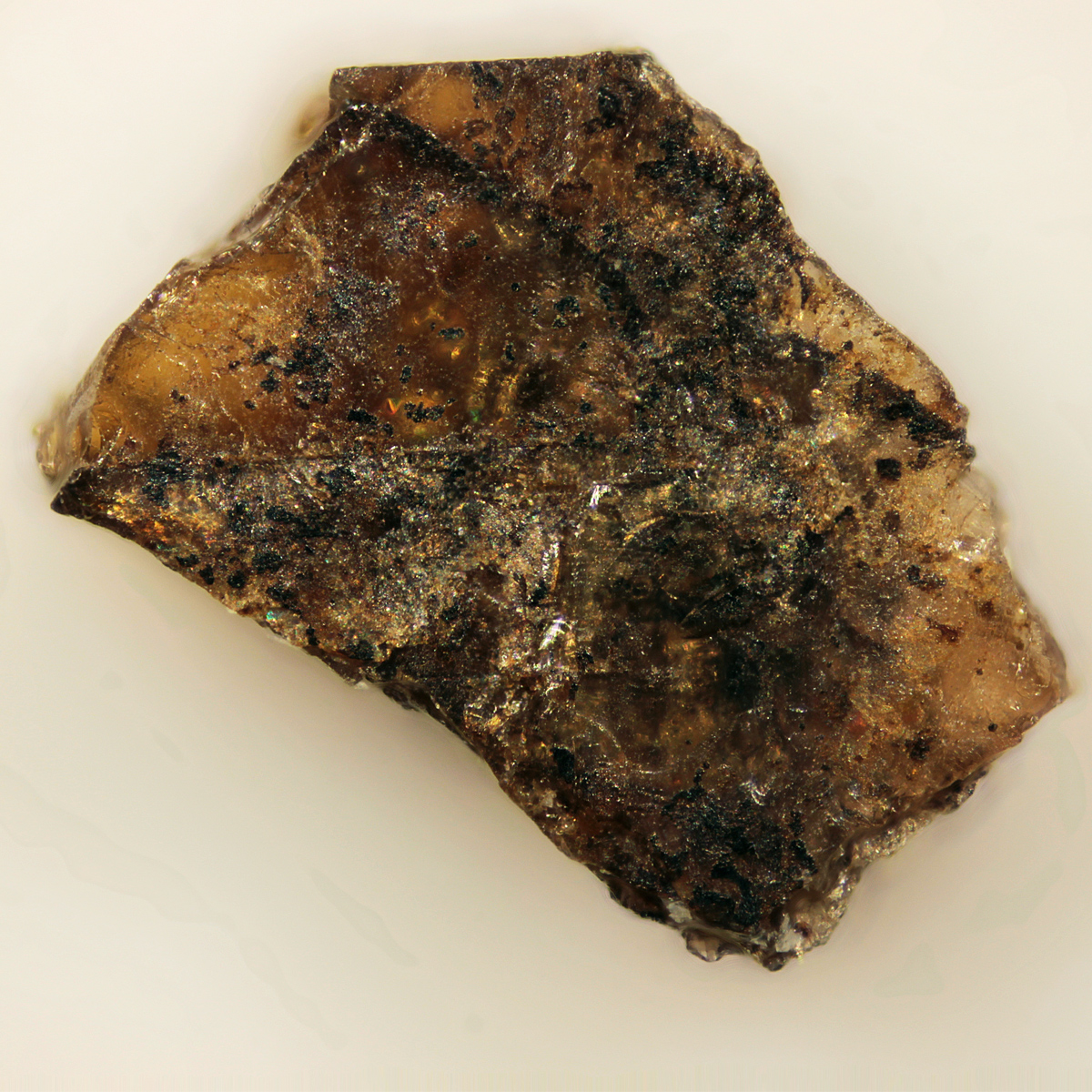
- Georgbarsanovite

General
- Category: Silicate mineral, Cyclosilicate
- Formula: Na_{12}(Mn,Sr,REE)_{3}Ca_{6}Fe_{3}^{2+}Zr_{3}NbSi_{25}O_{76}Cl_{2}·H_{2}O (original form)
- IMA symbol: Gba
- Strunz classification: 9.CO.10 (10 ed); 8/E.23-15 (8 ed)
- Dana classification: 64.1.2.2
- Crystal system: Trigonal
- Crystal class: Ditrigonal pyramidal (3m) (same H-M symbol)
- Space group: R3m
- Unit cell: a = 14.26, c = 29.95 [Å] (approximated); Z = 3

Identification
- Color: Yellow-green
- Crystal habit: pseudo-octahedra
- Cleavage: No
- Fracture: Uneven
- Tenacity: Brittle
- Luster: Vitreous
- Streak: White
- Diaphaneity: Transparent
- Optical properties: Uniaxial (-)
- Refractive index: nω 1.64, nε=1.63 (approximated)
- Pleochroism: green to pale yellow
- Common impurities: F, K, Y

Georgbarsanovite is a very rare mineral of the eudialyte group, formerly known under unaccepted name as barsanovite, with formula Na_{12}(Mn,Sr,REE)_{3}Ca_{6}Fe_{3}^{2+}Zr_{3}NbSi(Si_{3}O_{9})_{2}(Si_{9}O_{27})_{2}O_{4}Cl_{2}·H_{2}O. The original formula was extended to show the presence of cyclic silicate groups and the domination of silicon at the M4 site. "REE", standing for rare earth elements, is dominated by cerium. Georgbarsanovite is characterized in dominance of manganese at the N4 site. It also differs from most other accepted group representatives in its colour. The mineral was found in nepheline pegmatite near Petrelius River, Khibiny massif, Kola Peninsula, Russia. It is named after Russian mineralogist Georg Barsanov.

== Notes on chemistry ==
Georgbarsanovite contains admixtures of fluorine, potassium and yttrium, with traces of titanium, hafnium, and barium.
