= Khomyakovite =

Mineral of the eudialyte group

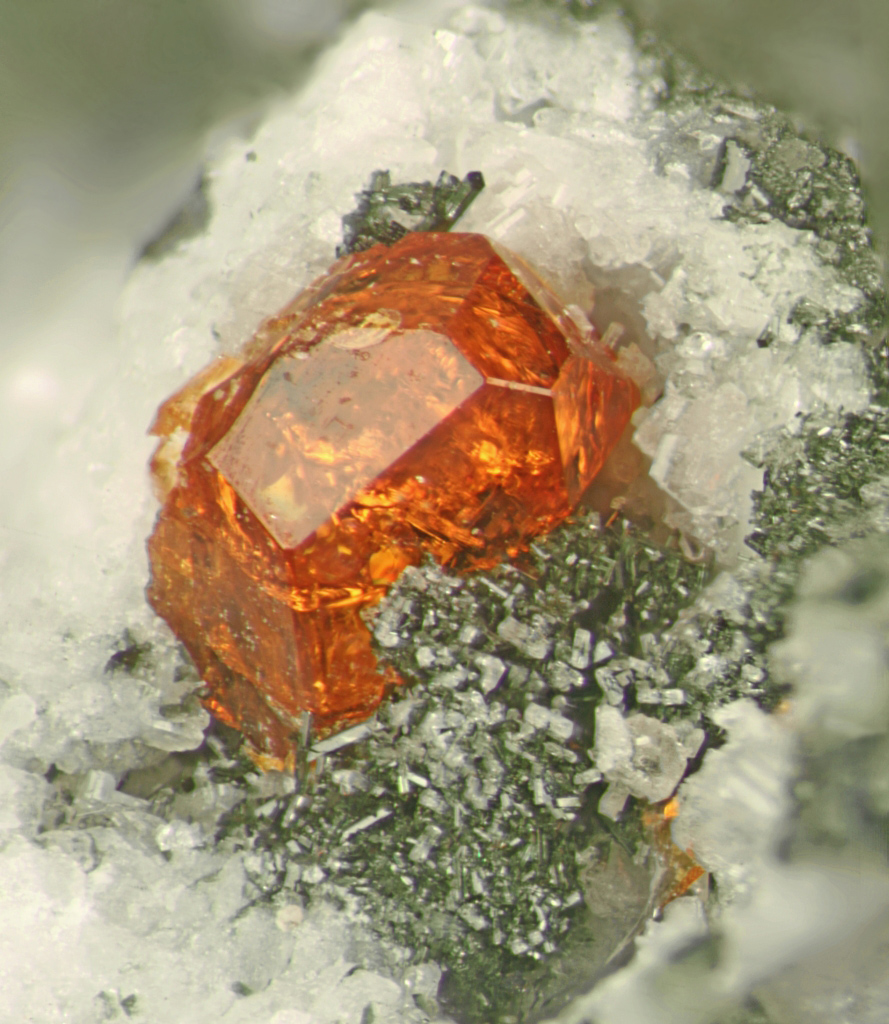

General
- Category: Silicate mineral, cyclosilicate
- Formula: Na_{12}Sr_{3}Ca_{6}Fe_{3}Zr_{3}W(Si_{25}O_{73})(O,OH,H_{2}O)_{3}(OH,Cl)_{2} (original form)
- IMA symbol: Kmy
- Strunz classification: 9.CO.10 (10 ed); 8/E.23-30 (8 ed)
- Dana classification: 64.1.2.5
- Crystal system: Trigonal
- Crystal class: Ditrigonal pyramidal (3m); H-M symbol: (3m)
- Space group: R3m
- Unit cell: a = 14.30, c = 30.08 [Å] (approximated); Z = 3

Identification
- Color: Orange to orange-red
- Crystal habit: Aggregates (anhedral to subhedral)
- Cleavage: None
- Fracture: Uneven
- Tenacity: Brittle
- Mohs scale hardness: 5–6
- Luster: Vitreous
- Streak: White
- Diaphaneity: Transparent to translucent
- Density: 3.14 (calculated)
- Optical properties: Uniaxial (−)
- Refractive index: nω = 1.63, nε = 1.63 (approximated)
- Pleochroism: None

Khomyakovite is an exceedingly rare mineral of the eudialyte group, with formula Na_{12}Sr_{3}Ca_{6}Fe_{3}Zr_{3}W(Si_{25}O_{73})(O,OH,H_{2}O)_{3}(OH,Cl)_{2}. The original formula was extended to show the presence of both the cyclic silicate groups and M4-site silicon, according to the nomenclature of the eudialyte group. Some niobium substitutes for tungsten in khomyakovite. Khomyakovite is an iron-analogue of manganokhomyakovite, the second mineral being a bit more common. The two minerals are the only group representatives, beside taseqite, with species-defining strontium, although many other members display strontium diadochy. Khomyakovite is the third eudialyte-group mineral with essential tungsten (after johnsenite-(Ce) and manganokhomyakovite).

== Occurrence and association ==
Khomyakovite, manganokhomyakovite, johnsenite-(Ce) and oneillite are four eudialyte-group minerals with type locality in Mont Saint-Hilaire, Quebec, Canada. Khomyakovite itself is associated with analcime, annite, natrolite, titanite, calcite, and pyrite.

== Notes on chemistry ==
Impurities in khomyakovite include niobium, potassium and manganese, with minor rare earth elements, magnesium, titanium, hafnium and aluminium.
