= Rastsvetaevite =

Mineral of the eudialyte group

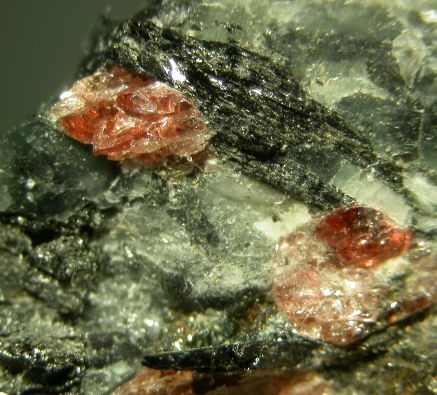
- Tiny dark pink grains of rastsvetaevite in matrix. Field of view 3 mm. From: Rasvumchorr Mt, Khibiny Massif, Murmansk Oblast, Russia

General
- Category: Silicate mineral, Cyclosilicate
- IMA symbol: Rtv
- Strunz classification: 9.CO.10
- Dana classification: 64.1b.1.2
- Crystal system: Trigonal
- Crystal class: Ditrigonal pyramidal (3m); H-M symbol: (3m)
- Space group: R3m
- Unit cell: a = 14.25, c = 60.97 [Å] (approximated); Z = 3

Identification
- Color: Reddish-pink
- Crystal habit: irregular grains
- Fracture: Conchoidal
- Tenacity: Brittle
- Mohs scale hardness: 5-6
- Luster: Vitreous
- Streak: White
- Diaphaneity: Transparent
- Specific gravity: 2.86
- Optical properties: Uniaxial (+)
- Refractive index: nω = 1.60 nε = 1.60 (approximated)

Rastsveatevite is a rare mineral of the eudialyte group with the chemical formula Na_{27}K_{8}Ca_{12}Fe_{3}Zr_{6}Si_{4}[Si_{3}O_{9}]_{4}[Si_{9}O_{27}]_{4}(O,OH,H_{2}O)_{6}Cl_{2}. Its structure is modular. It is only the third member of the group after andrianovite and davinciite with essential (site-dominating) potassium. Potassium and sodium enter both N4 and M2 sites. The mineral is named after Russian crystallographer Ramiza K. Rastsvetaeva.

== Occurrence and association ==
Rastsvetaevite was originally found in hyperagpaitic (ultra-alkaline) pegmatite at Mt. Rasvumchorr, Khibiny massif, Kola Peninsula, Russia. Associated minerals are aegirine, nacaphite, nepheline, natrite, schcherbakovite, sodalite, villiaumite, and rasvumite.

== Notes on crystal structure ==
The c unit cell parameter in rastsvetaevite is doubled.
