= Mogovidite =

Mineral of the eudialyte group

General
- Category: Cyclosilicate
- Formula: Na_{9}(Ca,Na)_{6}Ca_{6}(Fe^{3+},Fe^{2+})_{2}Zr_{3}[]Si_{25}O_{72}(CO_{3})(OH,H_{2}O)_{4} (original form)
- IMA symbol: Mgo
- Strunz classification: 9.CO.10
- Dana classification: 64.1.6
- Crystal system: Trigonal
- Crystal class: Hexagonal scalenohedral (3̅m); H-M symbol: (3̅ 2/m)
- Space group: R3̅m
- Unit cell: a = 14.23, c = 29.98 [Å] (approximated); Z = 3

Identification
- Color: Brown to reddish-brown
- Crystal habit: grains and crystals
- Cleavage: No
- Tenacity: Brittle
- Density: 2.91 (measured)
- Optical properties: Uniaxial (−)
- Refractive index: nω = 1.62, nε = 1.61 (approximated)

Mogovidite is a very rare mineral of the eudialyte group, It is similar to feklichevite, differing from it in the presence of essential vacancies (at the M3 site) and carbonate group. Another specific feature is the dominance of ferric iron – a feature shared with other eudialyte-group members, including feklichevite, fengchengite, golyshevite and ikranite. Similarly to golyshevite, it is calcium-dominant, however on three (not two) sites: M(1), N(3) and N(4). It has a molecular mass of 3,066.24 gm. Mogovidite's formula given as Na_{9}(Ca,Na)_{6}Ca_{6}(Fe^{3+},Fe^{2+})_{2}Zr_{3}[]Si(Si_{9}O_{27})_{2}(Si_{3}O_{9})_{2}(CO_{3})(OH,H_{2}O)_{4}. The formula given is based on the original one but extended to show the presence of cyclic silicate groups.

== Occurrence and association ==
As golyshevite, mogovidite was discovered in calcium-bearing peralkaline pegmatites of the Kovdor massif, Kola Peninsula, Russia. The mineral name is of geographical origin – mogovidite is named after Mt. Mogo-Vid located in the vicinity of type locality. Association of mogovidite: aegirine-augite, andradite, calcite, humite, nepheline, pectolite, scolecite, titanite, zircon.

== Notes on chemistry ==
Chemical impurities in mogovidite include chlorine, potassium, and manganese, with trace titanium, cerium, and lanthanum.
