= Davinciite =

Rare eudialyte group mineral

General
- Category: Silicate mineral, Cyclosilicate
- Formula: Na_{12}K_{3}Ca_{6}Fe^{2+}_{3}Zr_{3}(Si_{26}O_{73}OH)Cl_{2} (original form)
- IMA symbol: Dvc
- Crystal system: Trigonal
- Crystal class: Ditrigonal pyramidal (3m); H-M symbol: (3m)
- Space group: R3m
- Unit cell: a = 14.29, c = 30.03 [Å] (approximated), Z = 3

Identification
- Colour: Dark lavender
- Crystal habit: inclusions in rastsvetaevite
- Cleavage: None
- Fracture: Conchoidal
- Tenacity: Brittle
- Mohs scale hardness: 5
- Luster: Vitreous
- Streak: White
- Diaphaneity: Transparent
- Density: 2.82 (measured), 2.85 (calculated; approximated)
- Optical properties: Uniaxial (+)
- Refractive index: nω=1.61, nε=1.61 (approximated)
- Pleochroism: None
- Ultraviolet fluorescence: No
- Common impurities: Sr, Mn, Ti, H_{2}O

Davinciite is a very rare mineral of the eudialyte group, with the simplified formula Na_{12}K_{3}Ca_{6}Fe_{3}^{2+}Zr_{3}(Si_{26}O_{73}OH)Cl_{2}. The formula given does not show the presence of cyclic silicate groups. The mineral was named after Leonardo da Vinci to refer to the atypical geometrical forms he tended to use, compared by the authors of the mineral description to the atypical (not ideally centrosymmetrical) geometry of the Davinciite structure. The other quite atypical feature of Davinciite is its lavender colour, while the typical eudialyte is rather pink or red.

== Occurrence and association ==
Davinciite was discovered in hyperagpaitic (highly alkaline) pegmatite at Mt. Rasvmuchorr, Khibiny massif, Kola Peninsula, Russia. Aegirine, delhayelite, nepheline, potassium feldspar, shcherbakovite, sodalite (silicates), djerfisherite, rasvumite (sulfides), nitrite, nacaphite, and villiaumite are associated minerals.

== Notes on chemistry ==
Impurities in davinciite include strontium, manganese, titanium, with minor aluminium, barium, hafnium, and niobium. Some water is also present.

== See also ==
- List of minerals
- List of minerals named after people
