= Kentbrooksite =

Mineral of the eudialyte group

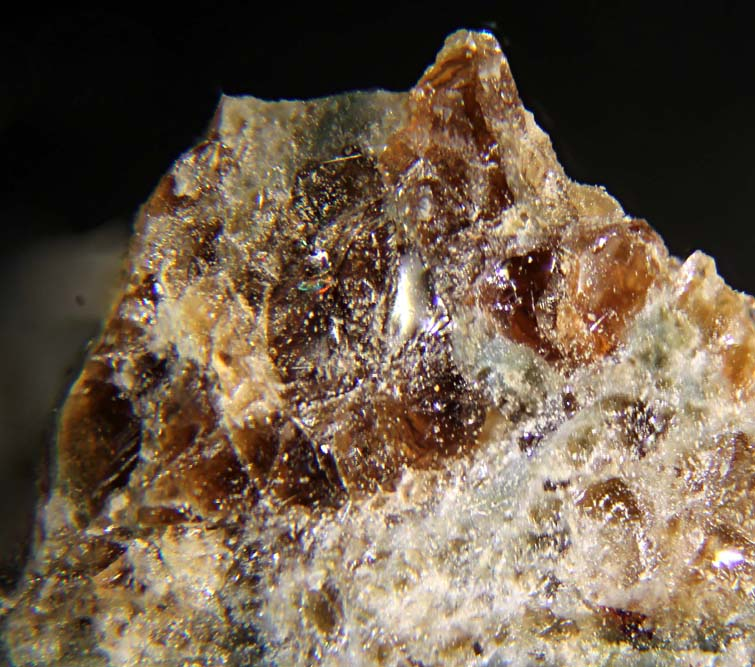

General
- Category: Silicate mineral, Cyclosilicate
- Formula: (Na,REE)_{15}(Ca,REE)_{6}Mn_{3}Zr_{3}NbSi_{25}O_{74}F_{2}·2H_{2}O (original form)
- IMA symbol: Ktb
- Strunz classification: 9.CO.10 (10 ed); 8/E.23-20 (8 ed)
- Dana classification: 64.1.2.1
- Crystal system: Trigonal
- Crystal class: Ditrigonal pyramidal (3m); H-M symbol: (3m)
- Space group: R3m
- Unit cell: a = 14.24, c = 30.03 [Å] (approximated); Z = 3

Identification
- Color: Yellow-brown
- Crystal habit: aggregates (anhedral to subhedral)
- Cleavage: None
- Fracture: Uneven
- Tenacity: Brittle
- Mohs scale hardness: 5–6
- Luster: Vitreous
- Streak: White
- Diaphaneity: Transparent
- Density: 3.10 (measured)
- Optical properties: Uniaxial (−)
- Refractive index: nω = 1.63, nε = 1.62 (approximated)
- Pleochroism: None
- Other characteristics: Pyroelectric

Kentbrooksite is a moderately rare mineral of the eudialyte group, with chemical formula (Na,REE)_{15}(Ca,REE)_{6}Mn_{3}Zr_{3}NbSi[(Si_{9}O_{27})_{2}(Si_{3}O_{9})_{2}O_{2}]F_{2}·2H_{2}O. This extended formula shows the presence of cyclic silicate groups and dominance of Si at the M4 site, according to the nomenclature of the eudialyte group. The characteristic features of kentbrooksite, that make it different from eudialyte are: (1) dominancy of fluorine (the only currently known example among the whole group), (2) dominancy of manganese, and (3) dominancy of niobium. Trace hafnium and magnesium are also reported. Kentbrooksite is relatively common when compared to most other species of the group.

== Occurrence ==
Kentbrooksite was found in alkaline pegmatites within pulaskites of the Kangerdlugssuaq intrusion in East Greenland.

== Notes on chemistry ==
Rare earth elements (REE) in kentbrooksite are dominated by cerium and yttrium. Potassium, strontium, iron, aluminium, titanium, magnesium are present as other admixtures. An important fraction of fluorine is substituted by chlorine and hydroxyl groups.
