= Stillwellite-(Ce) =

Rare-earth boro-silicate mineral

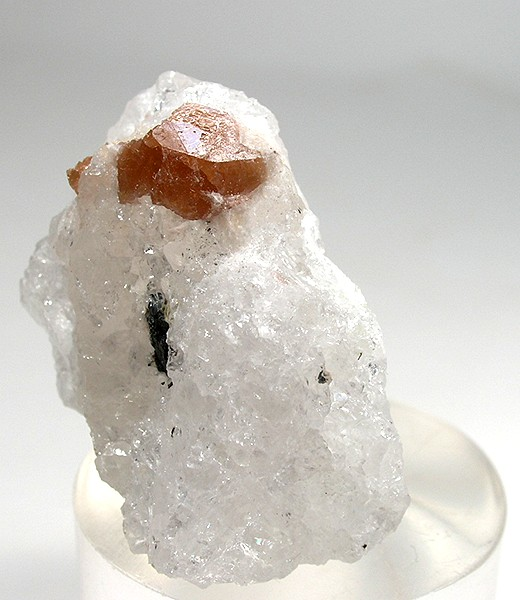
- 1.3 cm stillwellite-(Ce) crystal in matrix

General
- Category: Silicate mineral
- Formula: (Ce,La,Ca)BSiO_{5}
- IMA symbol: Swl
- Strunz classification: 9.AJ.25
- Dana classification: 54.02.03.02
- Crystal system: Trigonal
- Crystal class: Pyramidal (3); H-M symbol: (3)
- Space group: P3_{1}

Identification
- Color: Red-brown to pale pink
- Crystal habit: Flat rhombohedral crystals, massive
- Twinning: Observed on {100}
- Cleavage: Imperfect
- Fracture: Conchoidal
- Mohs scale hardness: 6.5
- Luster: Resinous
- Streak: White
- Diaphaneity: Transparent to translucent
- Specific gravity: 4.57–4.6
- Optical properties: Uniaxial (+)
- Refractive index: n_{ω} = 1.765, n_{ε} = 1.780
- Birefringence: δ = 0.015
- Other characteristics: Radioactive

Stillwellite-(Ce) is a rare-earth boro-silicate mineral with chemical formula (Ce,La,Ca)BSiO_{5}.

== Location ==
It occurs as a metasomatic replacement of metamorphosed limestones in the Mary Kathleen mine, Australia and in alkalic pegmatites associated with syenite in an alkaline massif in Tajikistan. It occurs in association with allanite, garnet, uraninite in the Australian deposit; with calcite, monazite, bastnasite, thorite, uranothorite and thorianite in the Desmont mine, Wilberforce, Ontario, Canada; and with pyrochlore, tienshanite, sogdianite, thorite, caesium kupletskite, reedmergnerite, steacyite, pectolite and quartz in the Tajikistan deposit. It has also been reported from Mont Saint-Hilaire, Quebec, Canada and from Mineville, Essex County, New York. Other occurrences include the Inagli massif, Yakutia, Russia, around Langesundsfjord, Norway, in the Ilimaussaq intrusive complex, southern Greenland and the Vico volcano, Lazio, Italy.

=== Discovery ===
It was first described in 1955 for an occurrence at the type locality is the Mary Kathleen mine, 55 km (34 mi) east of Mount Isa, Queensland, Australia. It was named for Australian mineralogist Frank Leslie Stillwell (1888–1963).

=== Chemistry Breakdown ===
	(1)	(2)		(1)	(2)
== SiO2 ==	22.40	22.06	La2O3	27.95	19.12
UO2		0.22	Ce2O3	33.15	30.82
ThO2		5.41	Pr2O3		1.82
B2O3	12.23	[13.46]	Nd2O3		5.36
Al2O3	0.42		Sm2O3		0.34
Y2O3	0.74	0.28	Fe2O3	0.18	
