= Ikranite =

Mineral member of the eudialyte group

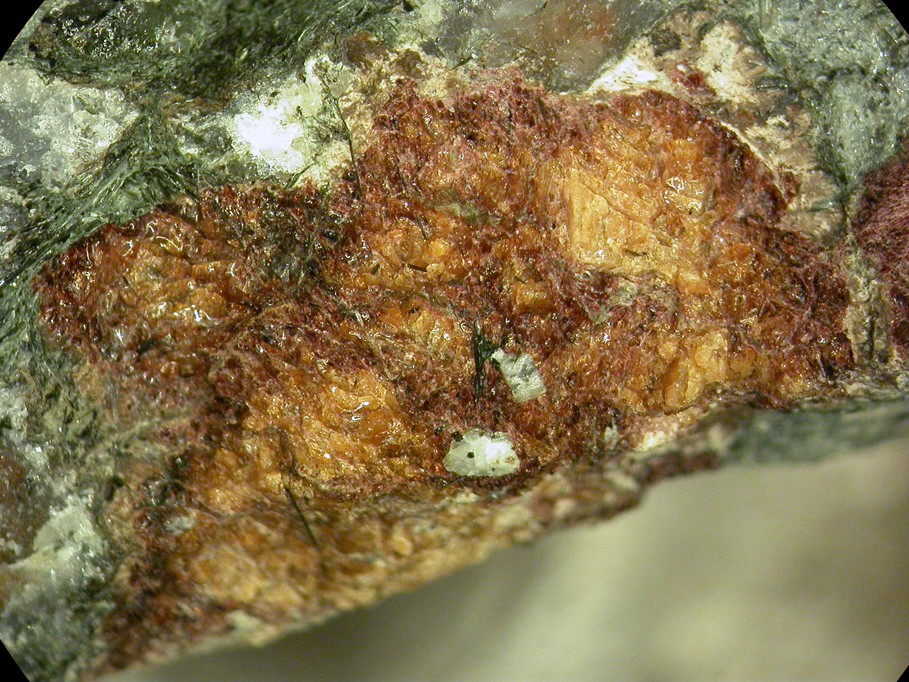
- Brown- yellow ikranite and aegirine fibers (field of view: c. 13 × 11 mm)

General
- Category: Cyclosilicate; Eudialyte group
- Formula: (Na,H_{3}O)_{15}(Ca,Mn,REE)_{6}Fe^{3+}_{2}Zr_{3}([ ],Zr)([ ],Si)Si_{24}O_{66}(O,OH)_{6}Cl_{2−3}H_{2}O
- IMA symbol: Ikr
- Strunz classification: 9.CO.10
- Dana classification: 64.1.1.08
- Crystal system: Trigonal
- Crystal class: Ditrigonal pyramidal (3m); H-M symbol: (3m)
- Space group: R3m
- Unit cell: a = 14.167, c = 30.081 [Å]; Z = 3

Identification
- Color: Yellow to brownish yellow
- Crystal habit: Pseudo-hexagonal
- Cleavage: None
- Fracture: Conchoidal
- Tenacity: Brittle
- Mohs scale hardness: 5
- Luster: Vitreous
- Streak: White
- Diaphaneity: Transparent
- Density: 2.82 g/cm^{3}
- Optical properties: Uniaxial; weak anomalous biaxiality
- Other characteristics: Mildly Radioactive

Ikranite is a member of the eudialyte group, named after the Shubinov Institute of Crystallography of the Russian Academy of Sciences. It is a cyclosilicate mineral that shows trigonal symmetry with the space group R3m, and is often seen with a pseudo-hexagonal habit. Ikranite appears as translucent and ranges in color from yellow to a brownish yellow. This mineral ranks a 5 on Mohs scale of mineral hardness, though it is considered brittle, exhibiting conchoidal fracture when broken.

== Eudialyte group ==
The eudialyte group currently consists of 27 known minerals (see below), all considered rare, with the exception of eudialyte. The list below also includes one of around six unnamed ("UM") species listed by Mindat. This group is growing exponentially, with 17 members having been written about since 2000, and the chemical possibility of several thousand species that have yet to be discovered. Eudialyte group members are typically found as small crystals which have a complex crystal structure that is unique in that it consists of both 3- and 9-member SiO_{4} tetrahedra rings.

Ikranite separates itself from the other members of this group through both its physical and compositional properties. The most prominent of these characteristics is the absence of sodium in its structure, along with the replacement of divalent iron with the trivalent form. This replacement also causes the characteristic color change from the reddish color seen in eudialyte to the yellow brown of ikranite, which can be further examined in its IR spectrum.

== Occurrence ==
Ikranite was first discovered on Mount Karnasurt (Kola Peninsula) in an agpaitic pegmatite, in the form of 1–2 cm grains. It is commonly associated with microcline, nepheline, lorenzenite, murmanite, lamprophyllite, and arfvedsonite. Tetranatrolite, and halloysite can also be found with it, though they occur at a later stage.

== Chemical composition ==
Compound	%
K_{2}O	0.44
Na_{2}O	7.99
SrO	1.61
CaO	6.32
La_{2}O_{3}	0.65
Ce_{2}O_{3}	1.55
HfO_{2}	0.31
ZrO_{2}	14.02
TiO_{2}	0.38
MnO	3.42
Nb_{2}O_{5}	0.29
FeO	0.39
Fe_{2}O_{3}	4.83
SiO_{2}	49.15
H_{2}O	7.74
Cl	0.90 (−0.20 -O=Cl_{2})
F	0.10 (−0.04 -O=F_{2})

== Crystal structure ==
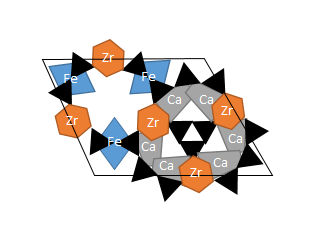
General Ikranite unit cell projected onto the (001) plane.

The crystal structure of ikranite can be described as a framework of three- and nine- member SiO_{4} tetrahedra rings, connected by Ca six-membered rings and Zn (Ti, or Nb) octahedra. Layers are constructed along the c axis as Si-Zr-Si-Ca. This repetition generates 12 layers, equal to ~30Å in size.

Differing types cations, anions, anionic groups, and water molecules fill any pockets within the framework. A defining feature is the location of the M(3) and M(4) vacancies in the nine-membered rings. These cavities may be occupied with Si in the M(3b) location, Zr in the M(4a), and Zr, Nb, or Ti in the (M4b), though the probability of occupancy is low. The M(2a) and M(2b) locations are also uniquely occupied in ikranite. The M(2a) vacancy is seen occupied by Fe^{3+} octahedra. Typically holding a five-membered polyhedra with Fe, the M(2b) position is occupied by Na cations. Ikranite also holds a significant amount of water in the space between the rings where an Na molecule is usually found. A distinctive feature is the oxonium groups that can also be found occupying Na sites.

Ikranite's general formula thus becomes (Na,H_{3}O)_{15}(Ca,Mn,REE)_{6}Fe^{3+}_{2}Zr_{3}([ ],Zr)([ ],Si)Si_{24}O_{66}(O,OH)_{6}Cl_{2−3}H_{2}O.
