= Cancrinite =

Feldspathoid mineral

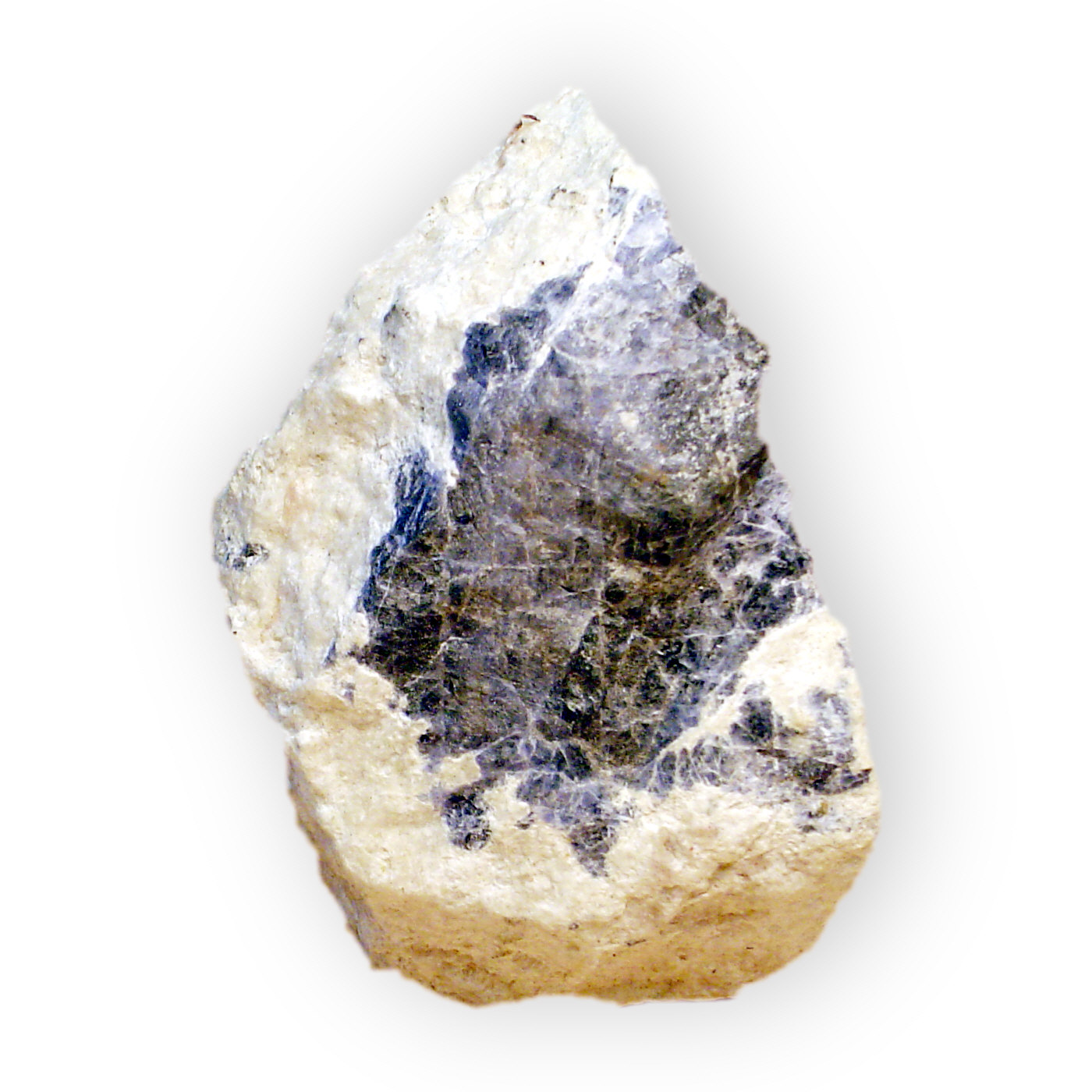
- Cancrinite

General
- Category: Tectosilicate minerals
- Group: Feldspathoid group, cancrinite group
- Formula: Na_{6}Ca_{2}[(CO_{3})_{2}|Al_{6}Si_{6}O_{24}]·2H_{2}O
- IMA symbol: Ccn
- Strunz classification: 9.FB.05
- Crystal system: Hexagonal
- Crystal class: Pyramidal (6) (same H-M symbol)
- Space group: P6_{3}
- Unit cell: a = 12.67(9) Å, c = 5.15(4) Å; Z= 1

Identification
- Color: Grey-green, white, yellow, blue, orange, reddish
- Crystal habit: Rare as prismatic crystals; typically massive
- Twinning: Rare – lamellar
- Cleavage: Perfect on {101̅0}, poor on {0001}
- Fracture: Irregular/uneven
- Tenacity: Brittle
- Mohs scale hardness: 5–6
- Luster: Vitreous, greasy, pearly
- Streak: White
- Diaphaneity: Transparent, translucent
- Specific gravity: 2.42 – 2.51
- Optical properties: Uniaxial (+/−)
- Refractive index: n_{ω} = 1.507 – 1.528 n_{ε} = 1.495 – 1.503
- Birefringence: δ = 0.012 – 0.025

Cancrinite is a complex carbonate and silicate of sodium, calcium and aluminium with the formula Na_{6}Ca_{2}[(CO_{3})_{2}|Al_{6}Si_{6}O_{24}]·2H_{2}O. It is classed as a member of the feldspathoid group of minerals; the alkali feldspars that are poor in silica. Yellow, orange, pink, white or even blue, it has a vitreous or pearly luster; a hardness of 5–6 and an uneven conchoidal fracture. It is unusual among the silicate minerals in that it will effervesce with hydrochloric acid due to the associated carbonate ions.

Found originally in 1839 in the Ural Mountains, it is named after Georg von Cancrin, a Russian minister of finance.
