= Carletonite =

Phyllosilicate mineral

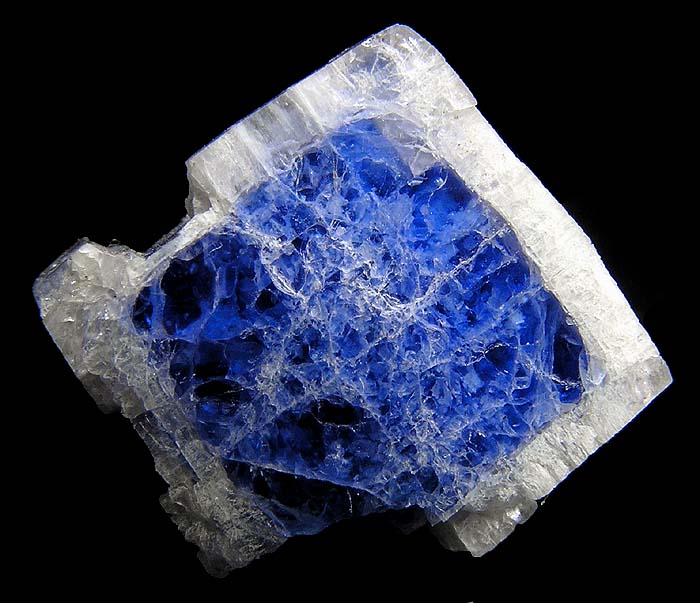
- Carletonite, Poudrette quarry, Mont Saint-Hilaire, Montérégie, Quebec, Canada

General
- Category: Phyllosilicate minerals
- Formula: KNa_{4}Ca_{4}(CO_{3})_{4}Si_{8}O_{18}(F,OH)·(H_{2}O)
- IMA symbol: Cto
- Strunz classification: 9.EB.20
- Crystal system: Tetragonal
- Crystal class: Ditetragonal dipyramidal (4/mmm); H–M symbol: (4/m 2/m 2/m)
- Space group: P4/mbm
- Unit cell: a = 13.17 Å, c = 16.69 Å; Z = 4

Identification
- Colour: Colourless, light blue, dark blue, or pink
- Crystal habit: Prismatic crystals, massive
- Cleavage: Perfect on {001}, good on {110}
- Fracture: Conchoidal
- Tenacity: Brittle
- Mohs scale hardness: 4 - 4 1/2
- Lustre: Vitreous
- Streak: White
- Diaphaneity: Transparent to translucent
- Specific gravity: 2.45
- Optical properties: Uniaxial (-)
- Refractive index: n_{ω} = 1.521 n_{ε} = 1.517
- Birefringence: δ = 0.004
- Pleochroism: Weak; O = pale blue; E = pale pinkish brown

Carletonite is a rare phyllosilicate mineral with formula KNa_{4}Ca_{4}(CO_{3})_{4}Si_{8}O_{18}(F,OH)·(H_{2}O). Its tetragonal crystals are a translucent blue, white, colorless or pink with a vitreous to dull lustre. It has a density of 2.45 and a hardness of 4–4.5.

It was discovered by G.Y Chao and named for the school he attended, Carleton University of Ottawa. It was first described in 1969 for an occurrence at Mont Saint-Hilaire, Quebec. The type locality at Mont Saint–Hilaire is the only reported occurrence.

It occurs in hornfels and siliceous marble xenoliths within and adjacent to a nepheline syenite intrusion. It occurs in association with quartz, narsarsukite, calcite, fluorite, ancylite, molybdenite, leucosphenite, lorenzenite, galena, albite, pectolite, apophyllite, leifite, microcline and arfvedsonite.
