= Leifite =

Silicate mineral

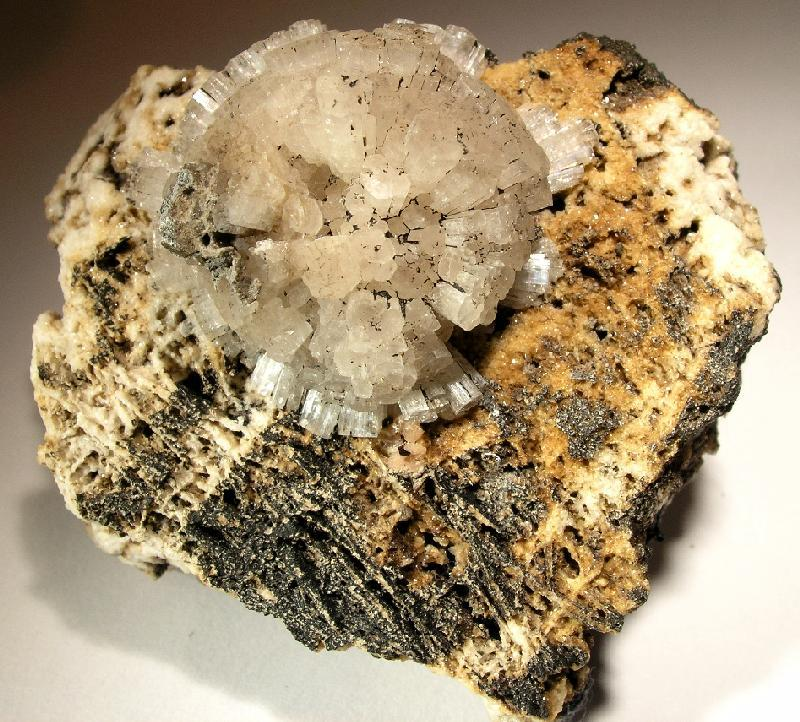

General
- Category: Silicate mineral
- Formula: Na_{2}(Si; Al; Be)_{7}(O; OH; F)_{14}
- IMA symbol: Lf
- Strunz classification: 9.EH.25 (10 ed); 8/J.10-10 (8 ed)
- Dana classification: 78.07.10.01
- Crystal system: Trigonal
- Crystal class: Hexagonal scalenohedral (3̅m); H-M symbol: (3̅ 2/m)
- Space group: P3̅m1

Identification
- Formula mass: 425.47 g/mol
- Colour: white, colourless to pale violet
- Crystal habit: Typically radiating aggregates of fine needles
- Twinning: None
- Cleavage: Distinct on {101̅0}
- Fracture: Uneven to splintery
- Tenacity: Brittle
- Mohs scale hardness: 6
- Lustre: Silky to vitreous
- Streak: White
- Diaphaneity: Transparent to translucent
- Specific gravity: 2.6
- Optical properties: Uniaxial (+)
- Refractive index: n_{ω} = 1.516 and n_{ε} = 1.520.
- Birefringence: δ = 0. 011

Leifite is a rare tectosilicate. Tectosilicates are built on a framework of tetrahedra with silicon or aluminium at the centre and oxygen at the vertices; they include feldspars and zeolites, but leifite does not belong in either of these categories. It is a member of the leifite group, which includes telyushenkoite (Cs,Na,K)Na_{6}(Be_{2}Al_{3}Si_{15}O_{39}) and eirikite KNa_{6}Be_{2}(Si_{15}Al_{3})O_{39}F_{2}). Leifite was discovered in 1915, and named after Leif Ericson who was a Norse explorer who lived around 1000 AD, and was probably the first European to land in North America, nearly 500 years before Christopher Columbus. Eirikite was named in 2007 after Eirik Raude, or Erik the Red, (950–1003), who discovered Greenland and who was the father of Leif Ericson. The third mineral in the group, telyushenkoite, was discovered in 2001. It was not named after any of Leif Ericson's family members, but after a professor of geology in Turkmenistan.

== Structure ==
Leifite is a trigonal mineral, class 3̅ 2/m, space group P3̅m1. There are 3 formula units in the unit cell (Z = 3), and cell dimensions are 14.4 Å in the a direction and 4.9 Å in the c direction. It contains OH groups, but no water of crystallization as was previously assumed. Tetrahedrons of silicon or aluminium atoms surrounded by four oxygen atoms link to form six-membered rings stacked along the c direction to form channels, similar to those in zeolites.

== Appearance ==
Leifite is generally white or colourless, with a white streak and a silky or vitreous lustre. It occurs as fine needles making up radiating aggregates and rosettes. Individual crystals are deeply striated hexagonal prisms that are transparent to translucent.

== Physical Properties ==
The mineral is hard, with Mohs hardness 6, the same as that of feldspar, and specific gravity 2.6, again like the feldspars. It is brittle, with an uneven to splintery fracture.

== Optical Properties ==
Leifite is uniaxial(+) with refractive indices n_{ω} = 1.516 and n_{ε} = 1.520. The maximum birefringence δ = 0. 011. Leifite is not luminescent.

== Occurrence ==
The type locality is the Narsaarsuk pegmatite on the Narsaarsuk Plateau, Igaliku, Narsaq, Kujalleq, Greenland and type material is kept at the University of Copenhagen, Denmark, and at the National Museum of Natural History in Washington DC, US. Leifite occurs in cavities in alkali-pegmatite veins. At Mont Saint-Hilaire it occurs as crystals up to 5 cm long and as disk-shaped aggregates and radially fibrous spheres associated with albite, natrolite, serandite and catapleite. In Greenland it occurs in a pegmatite with microcline, calcite, zinnwaldite and acmite. In Russia it occurs in the Lovozero Massif associated with albite and natrolite. In Norway it occurs in a nepheline syenite pegmatite on the south eastern part of the island of Vesle Aroya in the Langesundsfjord District, Oslo Region, as white to colourless fibrous masses and radiating bundles.
