= Amesite =

Phyllosilicate mineral in the serpentine subgroup

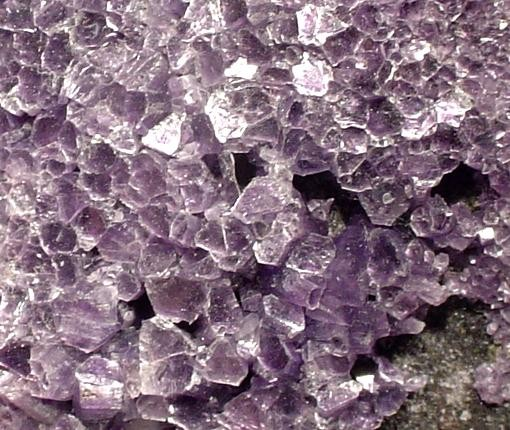

General
- Category: Phyllosilicate minerals
- Group: Kaolinite-Serpentine group, serpentine subgroup
- Formula: Mg_{2}Al_{2}SiO_{5}(OH)_{4}
- IMA symbol: Ame
- Strunz classification: 9.ED.15
- Crystal system: Triclinic
- Crystal class: Pedial (1) (same H-M symbol)
- Space group: C1
- Unit cell: a = 5.307(1), b = 9.195(2) c = 14.068(3) [Å] α = 90.09(2)° β = 90.25(2)°, γ = 89.96(2)°; Z = 4

Identification
- Color: White, colorless, pink to lilac, pale green
- Crystal habit: Crystals form as platy to tapering elongated pseudohexagonal prisms
- Twinning: Common as six-fold sector twins on {001} and polysynthetic twins parallel to {010}
- Cleavage: Perfect on {001}
- Tenacity: Brittle
- Mohs scale hardness: 2.5–3
- Luster: Pearly
- Streak: White with pale green tint
- Diaphaneity: Transparent to translucent
- Specific gravity: 2.77
- Optical properties: Biaxial (+)
- Refractive index: n_{α} = 1.597 n_{β} = 1.599 n_{γ} = 1.615
- Birefringence: δ = 0.018
- Other characteristics: Kaolinite-serpentine group

Amesite is a mineral with general formula of Mg_{2}Al_{2}SiO_{5}(OH)_{4}.

Amesite crystallizes in the triclinic crystal system. It contains three axes of unequal length, not at right angles.

It was first described in 1876 for an occurrence in the Chester Emery Mines, Chester, Hampden County, Massachusetts. It was named for mine owner James Ames. It occurs in an environment of low-grade metamorphism affecting rocks with high aluminium and magnesium content. It occurs associated with vesuvianite, chlorite, magnetite, rutile, diaspore, grossular, calcite, diopside and clinozoisite in various locations.

Amesite is an uncommon silicate mineral which has been reported from a variety of locations worldwide. Amesite has the first reported natural occurrence of the 6R polytype for a trioctahedral 1:1 layer silicate.
