= Osumilite =

Cyclosilicate mineral

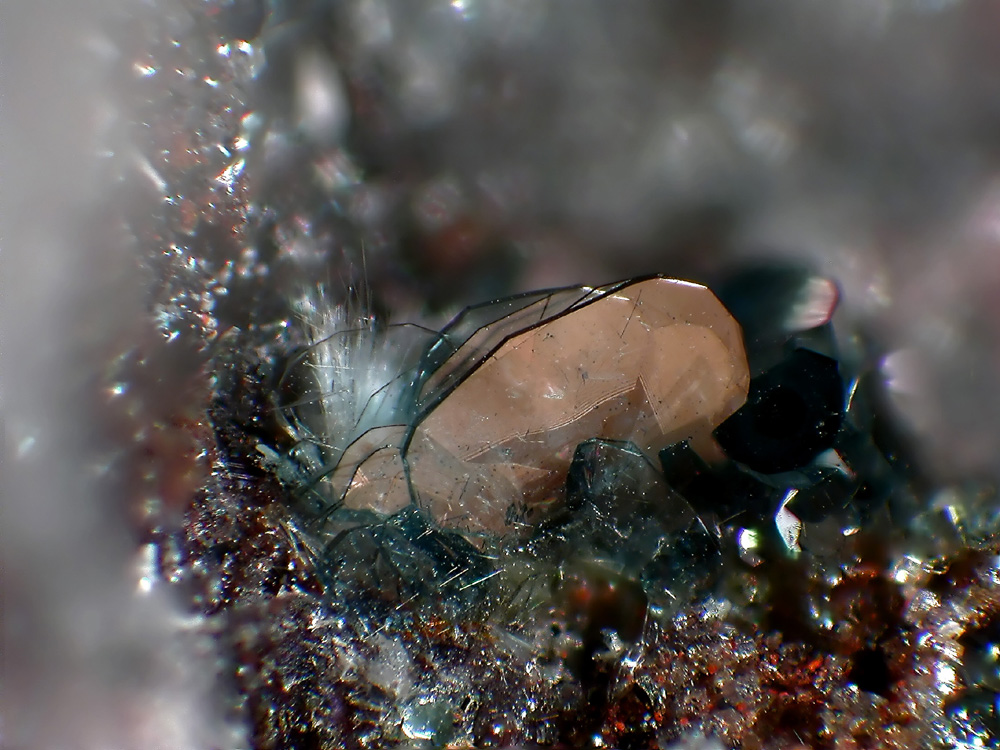
- Osumilite tablets with mullite from Ochtendung, Eifel, Germany.

General
- Category: Cyclosilicate
- Formula: (K,Na)(Fe,Mg)_{2}(Al,Fe)_{3}(Si,Al)_{12}O_{30}
- IMA symbol: Osm
- Strunz classification: 9.CM.05
- Dana classification: 63.02.01a.06
- Crystal system: Hexagonal
- Crystal class: Dihexagonal dipyramidal (6mmm); H-M symbol: (6/m 2/m 2/m)
- Space group: P6/mcc
- Unit cell: a = 10.15, c = 14.25 [Å]; Z = 2

Identification
- Color: Black, dark blue, dark brown, pink, gray
- Crystal habit: Crystals tabular to prismatic also anhedral and massive
- Twinning: Rarely
- Cleavage: None
- Fracture: Subconchoidal
- Mohs scale hardness: 5 - 6
- Luster: Vitreous
- Streak: Blue-gray
- Diaphaneity: Translucent
- Specific gravity: 2.62 - 2.64
- Optical properties: Uniaxial (+) anomalously biaxial
- Refractive index: w=1.545-1.547, e=1.549-1.551
- Birefringence: 0.004
- Pleochroism: Strong

Osumilite is a very rare potassium-sodium-iron-magnesium-aluminium silicate mineral. Osumilite is part of the milarite group (also known as the milarite-osumilite group) of cyclosilicates.

== Characteristics ==
Osumilite chemical formula is (K,Na)(Fe,Mg)_{2}(Al,Fe)_{3}(Si,Al)_{12}O_{30}. It is translucent and the typical coloring is either blue, black, brown, or gray. It displays no cleavage and has a vitreous luster. Osumilite has a hardness between 5-6 on the Mohs hardness scale.

The hexagonal crystal structure of osumilite is an unusual molecular make-up. The primary unit is a double ring, with a formula of Si_{12}O_{30}. Normal cyclosilicate have rings composed of six silicate tetrahedrons; Si_{6}O_{18}. In a double ring structure, two normal rings are linked by sharing six oxygens, one from each tetrahedron in each six membered ring.

== Occurrence ==
Osumilite, was first discovered as grains in volcanic rocks near Osumi, Japan. It was confused with a similar mineral cordierite because of their similar coloring. It can be found in high-grade metamorphic rocks, xenoliths and in the groundmass of rhyolite and dacite.

Osumilite is found in the Obsidian Cliffs, Oregon; Sardinia, Italy; Kagoshima and Yamanashi Prefecture, Japan; and the Eifel district in Germany. Osumilite pseudomorphs are known from a number of ultrahigh-temperature rocks, including those of southern Madagascar.

== See also ==
- List of minerals
