= Narsarsukite =

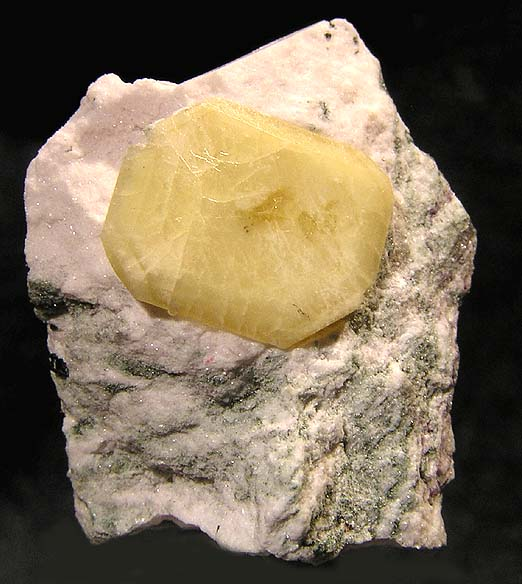
- 1.3 cm crystal of narsarsukite from Mont Saint-Hilaire

General
- Category: Silicate mineral
- Formula: Na_{4}(Ti,Fe)_{4}[Si_{8}O_{20}](O,OH,F)_{4}
- IMA symbol: Nar
- Strunz classification: 9.DJ.05
- Crystal system: Tetragonal
- Crystal class: Dipyramidal (4/m); H-M symbol: (4/m)
- Space group: I4/m
- Unit cell: a = 10.72, c = 7.95 [Å]; Z = 4

Identification
- Color: Honey to lemon-yellow, reddish brown, brownish gray, tan, pink; may be green from inclusions; may show color zoning
- Crystal habit: Occurs as flat tabular to equant, striated crystals In divergent, radiating groups; massive
- Cleavage: Good on {100} and {110}
- Fracture: Uneven to subconchoidal
- Tenacity: Brittle
- Mohs scale hardness: 5.5 - 7
- Luster: Vitreous, pearly on {110}
- Streak: White
- Diaphaneity: Transparent to translucent
- Specific gravity: 2.64-2.83
- Optical properties: Uniaxial (+)
- Refractive index: n_{ω} = 1.609 n_{ε} = 1.630
- Birefringence: δ = 0.021
- Pleochroism: Weak; O = colorless to yellow; E = colorless to honey-yellow

Narsarsukite is a rare silicate mineral with either the chemical formula Na_{2}(Ti,Fe^{3+})Si_{4}(O,F)_{11} or Na_{4}(Ti,Fe)_{4}[Si_{8}O_{20}](O,OH,F)_{4}.

It was first described in 1900 for an occurrence in the Narsarsuk pegmatite in the Ilimaussaq intrusive complex of West Greenland. It has also been reported from a syenite which intruded limestone in the Sweetgrass Hills, Montana, and within hornfels and marble xenoliths in the alkalic intrusive of Mont Saint-Hilaire, Quebec. It occurs associated with aegirine, microcline, albite, elpidite, epididymite, taeniolite, pectolite, calcite, galena and quartz.

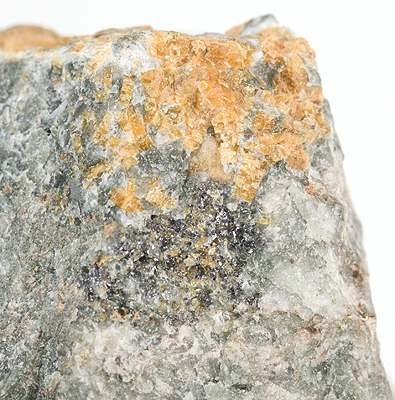
Narsarsukite from Whitlash, Liberty County, Montana (size: 5.6 x 5.4 x 5.1 cm)
