= Silicate mineral =

Rock-forming minerals with predominantly silicate anions

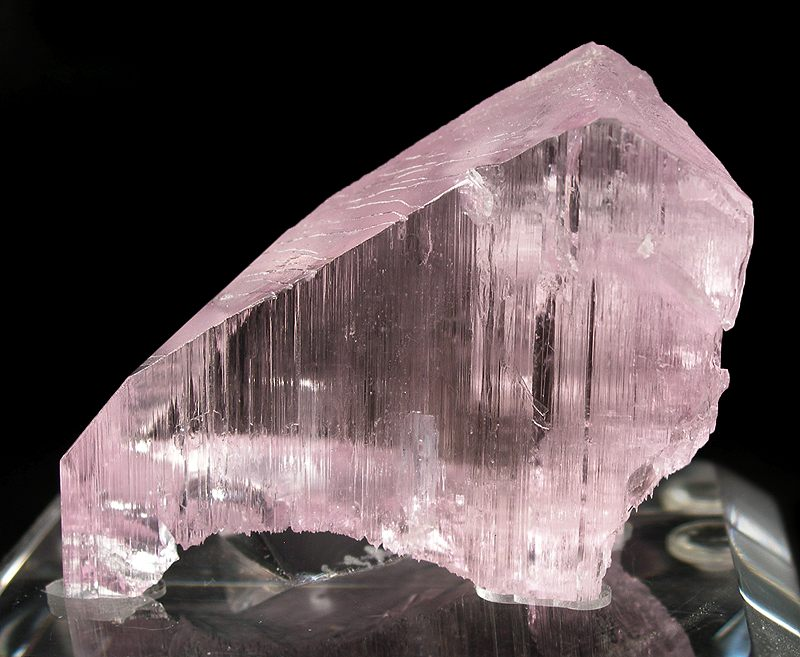
Lithium aluminium silicate mineral spodumene

Silicate minerals are rock-forming minerals made up of silicate groups. They are the largest and most important class of minerals and make up approximately 90 percent of Earth's crust.

In mineralogy, the crystalline forms of silica (SiO_{2}) are usually considered to be tectosilicates, and they are classified as such in the Dana classification system (75.1). However, the Nickel–Strunz classification categorizes them as oxide minerals (4.DA). Silica is found in nature as the mineral quartz and its polymorphs.

On Earth, a wide variety of silicate minerals occur in an even wider range of combinations as a result of the processes that have been forming and re-working the crust for billions of years. These processes include partial melting, crystallization, fractionation, metamorphism, weathering, and diagenesis.

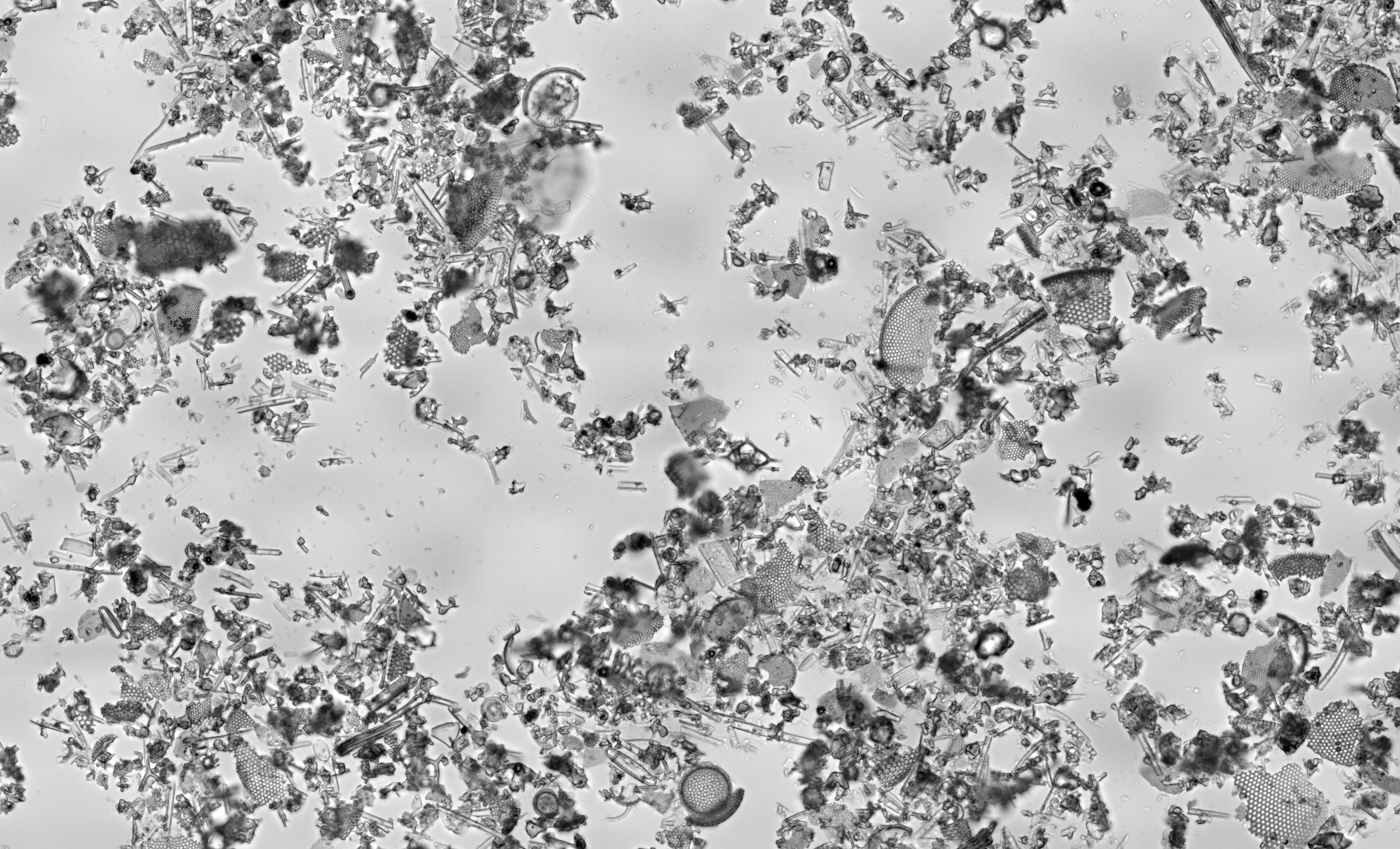
Diatomaceous earth, a biogenic form of silica as viewed under a microscope. The imaged region measures approximately 1.13 by 0.69 mm.

Living organisms also contribute to this geologic cycle. For example, a type of plankton known as diatoms construct their exoskeletons ("frustules") from silica extracted from seawater. The frustules of dead diatoms are a major constituent of deep ocean sediment, and of diatomaceous earth.

== General structure ==
A silicate mineral is generally an inorganic compound consisting of subunits with the formula [SiO_{2+n}]^{2n−}. Although depicted as such, the description of silicates as anions is a simplification. Balancing the charges of the silicate anions are metal cations, M^{x+}. Typical cations are Mg^{2+}, Fe^{2+}, and Na^{+}. The Si-O-M linkage between the silicates and the metals are strong, polar-covalent bonds. Silicate anions ([SiO_{2+n}]^{2n−}) are invariably colorless, or when crushed to a fine powder, white. The colors of silicate minerals arise from the metal component, commonly iron.

In most silicate minerals, silicon is tetrahedral, being surrounded by four oxides. The coordination number of the oxides is variable except when it bridges two silicon centers, in which case the oxide has a coordination number of two.

Some silicon centers may be replaced by atoms of other elements, still bound to the four corner oxygen corners. If the substituted atom is not normally tetravalent, it usually contributes extra charge to the anion, which then requires extra cations. For example, in the mineral orthoclase [KAlSi_{3}O_{8}]_{n}, the anion is a tridimensional network of tetrahedra in which all oxygen corners are shared. If all tetrahedra had silicon centers, the anion would be just neutral silica [SiO_{2}]_{n}. Replacement of one in every four silicon atoms by an aluminum atom results in the anion [AlSi_{3}O^{−}_{8}]_{n}, whose charge is neutralized by the potassium cations K^{+}.

== Main groups ==
In mineralogy, silicate minerals are classified into seven major groups according to the structure of their silicate anion:

Major group	Structure	Chemical formula	Example
Nesosilicates	isolated silicon tetrahedra	[SiO_{4}]^{4−}	olivine, garnet, zircon...
Sorosilicates	double tetrahedra	[Si_{2}O_{7}]^{6−}	epidote, melilite group
Cyclosilicates	rings	[Si_{n}O_{3n}]^{2n−}	beryl group, tourmaline group
Inosilicates	single chain	[Si_{n}O_{3n}]^{2n−}	pyroxene group
Inosilicates	double chain	[Si_{4n}O_{11n}]^{6n−}	amphibole group
Phyllosilicates	sheets	[Si_{2n}O_{5n}]^{2n−}	micas and clays
Tectosilicates	3D framework	[Al_{x}Si_{y}O_{(2x+2y)}]^{x−}	quartz, feldspars, zeolites

Tectosilicates can only have additional cations if some of the silicon is replaced by an atom of lower valence such as aluminum. Al for Si substitution is common.

== Nesosilicates or orthosilicates ==
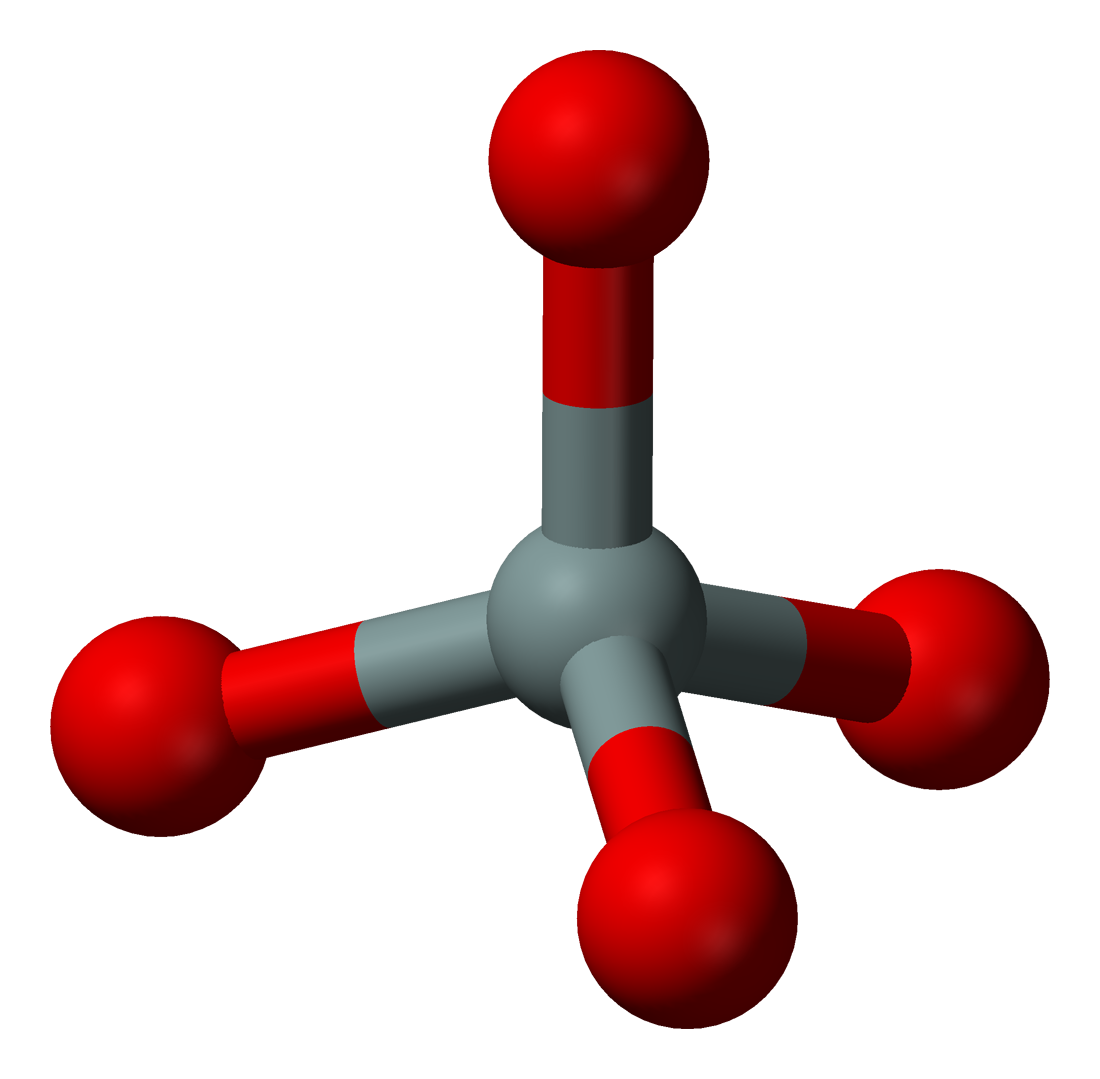
Orthosilicate anion SiO^{4−}_{4}. The grey ball represents the silicon atom, and the red balls are the oxygen atoms.

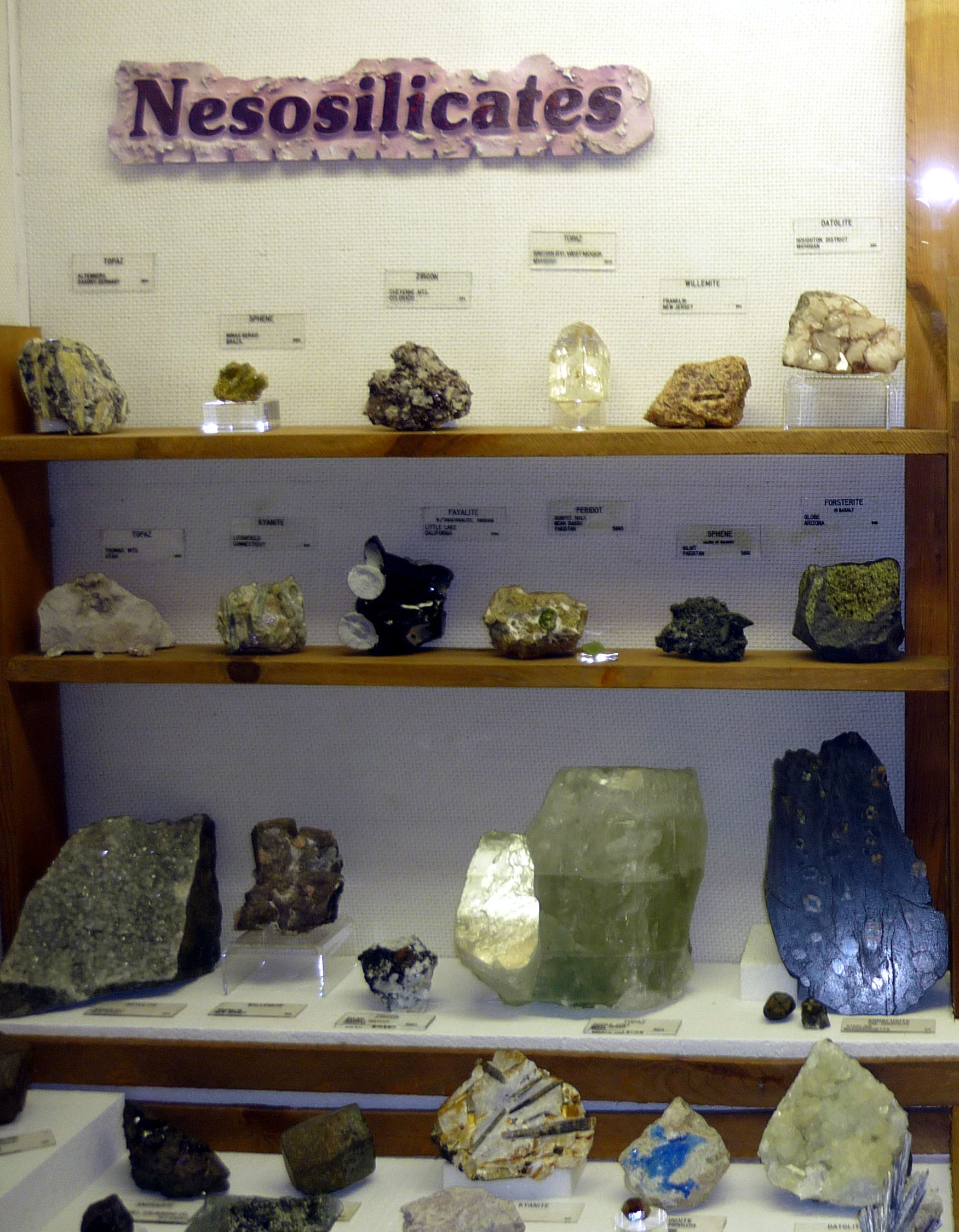
Nesosilicate specimens at the Museum of Geology in South Dakota

Nesosilicates (from Greek νῆσος nēsos 'island'), or orthosilicates, have the orthosilicate ion, present as isolated (insular) [SiO_{4}]^{4−} tetrahedra connected only by interstitial cations. The Nickel–Strunz classification is 09.A –examples include:

  - Phenakite – Be_{2}SiO_{4}
  - Willemite – Zn_{2}SiO_{4}
- Olivine group
  - Forsterite – Mg_{2}SiO_{4}
  - Fayalite – Fe_{2}SiO_{4}
  - Tephroite – Mn_{2}SiO_{4}
- Garnet group
  - Pyrope – Mg_{3}Al_{2}(SiO_{4})_{3}
  - Almandine – Fe_{3}Al_{2}(SiO_{4})_{3}
  - Spessartine – Mn_{3}Al_{2}(SiO_{4})_{3}
  - Grossular – Ca_{3}Al_{2}(SiO_{4})_{3}
  - Andradite – Ca_{3}Fe_{2}(SiO_{4})_{3}
  - Uvarovite – Ca_{3}Cr_{2}(SiO_{4})_{3}
  - Hydrogrossular – Ca_{3}Al_{2}Si_{2}O_{8}(SiO_{4})_{3−m}(OH)_{4m}
- Zircon group
  - Zircon – ZrSiO_{4}
  - Thorite – (Th,U)SiO_{4}
  - Hafnon – (Hf,Zr)SiO_{4}

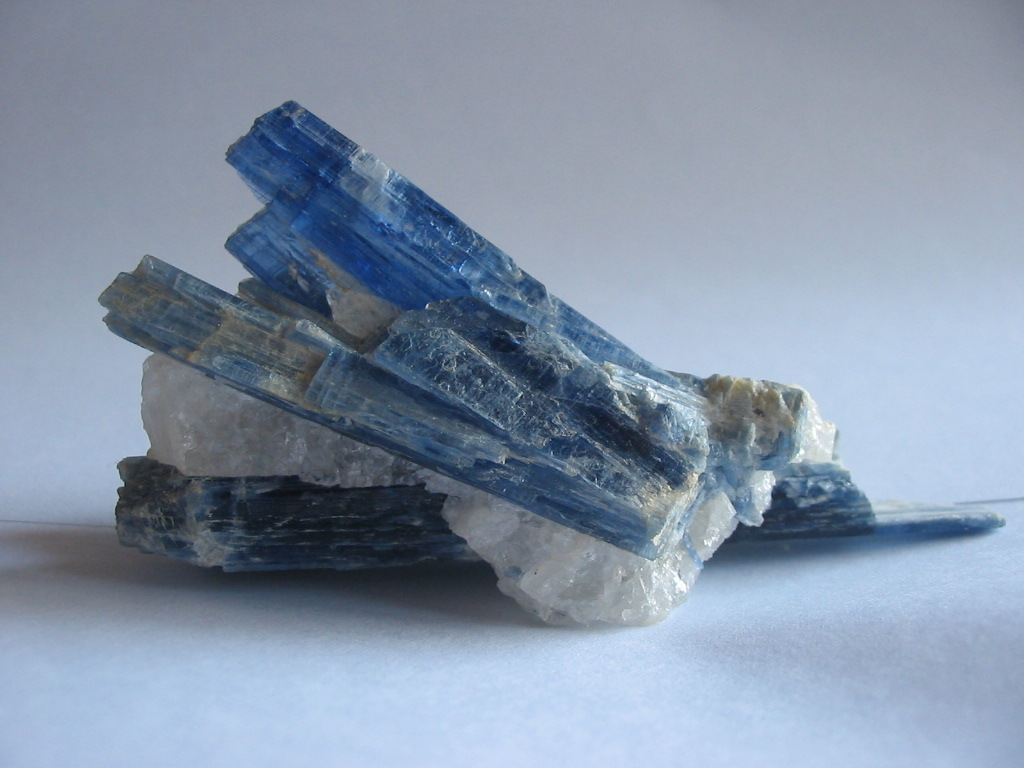
Kyanite crystals (unknown scale)

- Al_{2}SiO_{5} group
  - Andalusite – Al_{2}SiO_{5}
  - Kyanite – Al_{2}SiO_{5}
  - Sillimanite – Al_{2}SiO_{5}
  - Dumortierite – Al_{6.5–7}BO_{3}(SiO_{4})_{3}(O,OH)_{3}
  - Topaz – Al_{2}SiO_{4}(F,OH)_{2}
  - Staurolite – Fe_{2}Al_{9}(SiO_{4})_{4}(O,OH)_{2}
- Humite group – (Mg,Fe)_{7}(SiO_{4})_{3}(F,OH)_{2}
  - Norbergite – Mg_{3}(SiO_{4})(F,OH)_{2}
  - Chondrodite – Mg_{5}(SiO_{4})_{2}(F,OH)_{2}
  - Humite – Mg_{7}(SiO_{4})_{3}(F,OH)_{2}
  - Clinohumite – Mg_{9}(SiO_{4})_{4}(F,OH)_{2}
- Datolite – CaBSiO_{4}(OH)
- Titanite – CaTiSiO_{5}
- Chloritoid – (Fe,Mg,Mn)_{2}Al_{4}Si_{2}O_{10}(OH)_{4}
- Mullite (aka Porcelainite) – Al_{6}Si_{2}O_{13}

== Sorosilicates ==
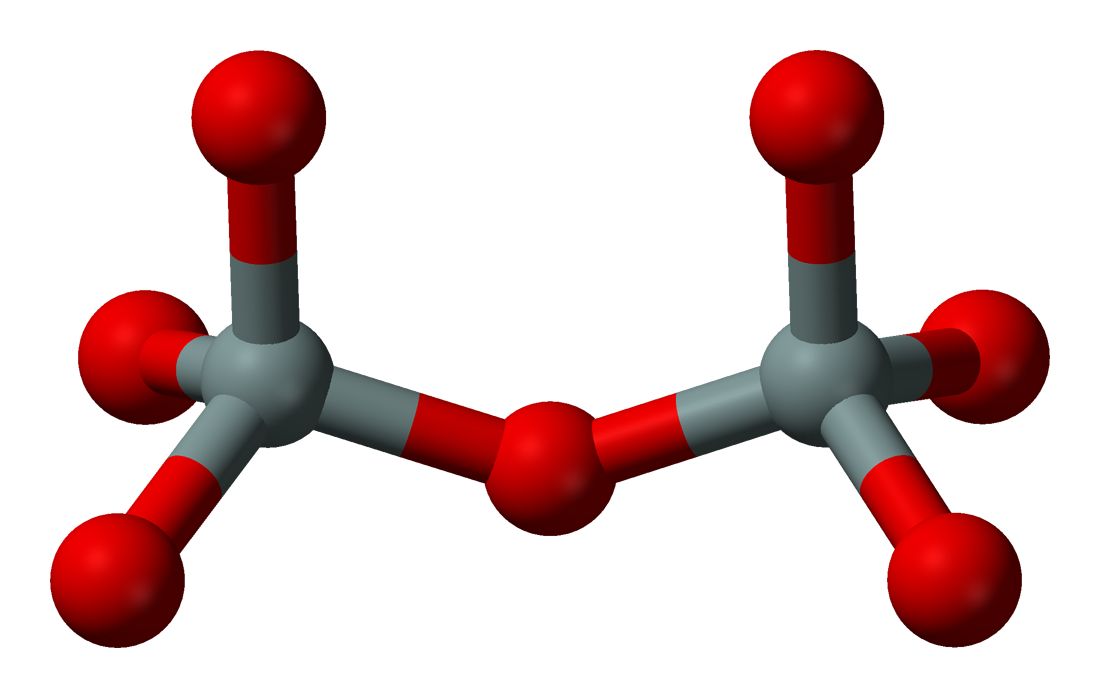
Pyrosilicate anion Si_{2}O^{6−}_{7}

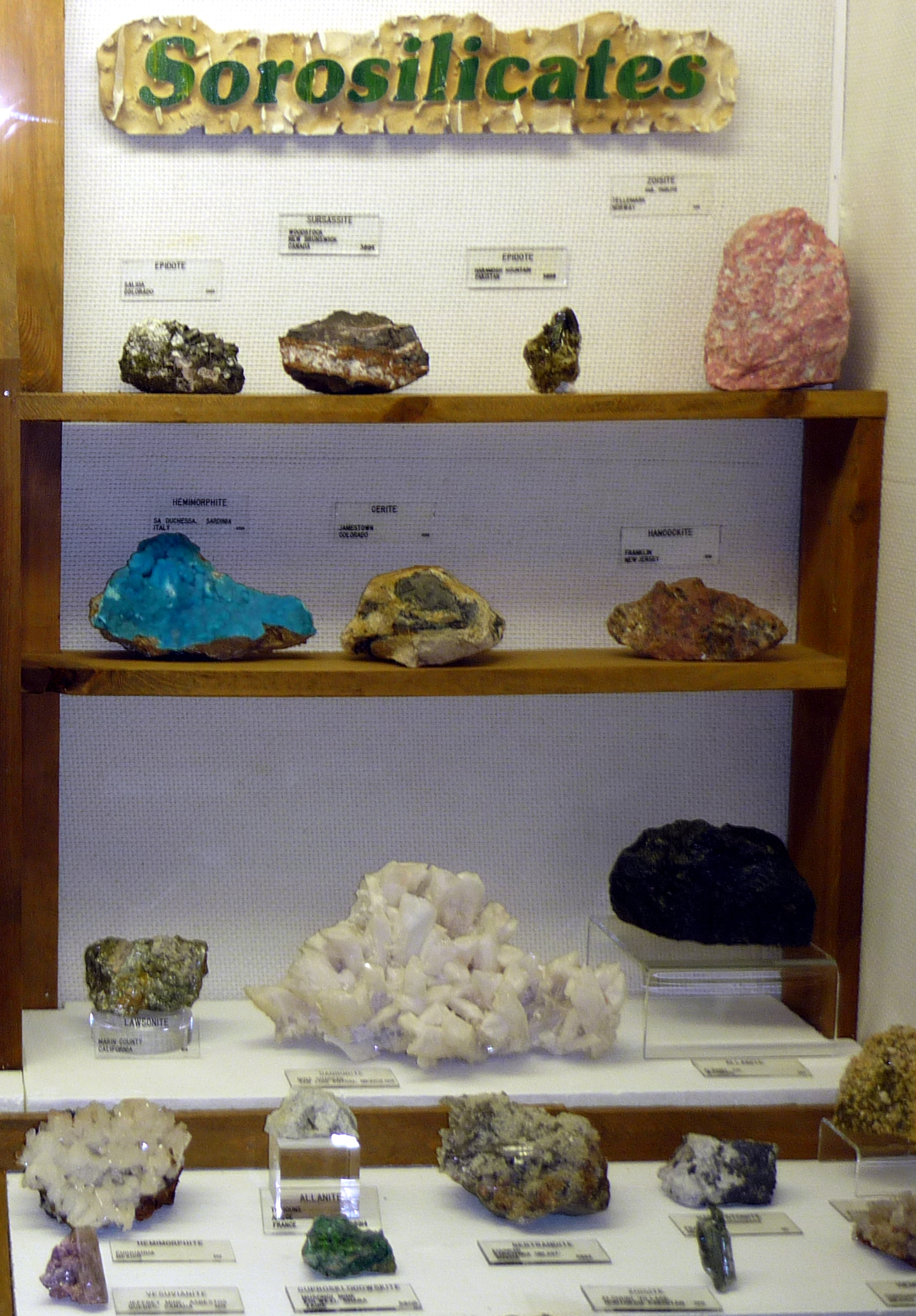
Sorosilicate exhibit at Museum of Geology in South Dakota

Sorosilicates (from Greek σωρός sōros 'heap, mound') have isolated pyrosilicate anions Si_{2}O^{6−}_{7}, consisting of double tetrahedra with a shared oxygen vertex—a silicon:oxygen ratio of 2:7. The Nickel–Strunz classification is 09.B. Examples include:

- Thortveitite – (Sc,Y)_{2}(Si_{2}O_{7})
- Hemimorphite (calamine) – Zn_{4}(Si_{2}O_{7})(OH)_{2}·H_{2}O
- Lawsonite – CaAl_{2}(Si_{2}O_{7})(OH)_{2}·H_{2}O
- Axinite – (Ca,Fe,Mn)_{3}Al_{2}(BO_{3})(Si_{4}O_{12})(OH)
- Ilvaite – CaFe^{II}_{2}Fe^{III}O(Si_{2}O_{7})(OH)
- Epidote group (has both (SiO_{4})^{4−} and (Si_{2}O_{7})^{6−} groups}
  - Epidote – Ca_{2}(Al,Fe)_{3}O(SiO_{4})(Si_{2}O_{7})(OH)
  - Zoisite – Ca_{2}Al_{3}O(SiO_{4})(Si_{2}O_{7})(OH)
    - Tanzanite – Ca_{2}Al_{3}O(SiO_{4})(Si_{2}O_{7})(OH)
  - Clinozoisite – Ca_{2}Al_{3}O(SiO_{4})(Si_{2}O_{7})(OH)
  - Allanite – Ca(Ce,La,Y,Ca)Al_{2}(Fe^{II},Fe^{III})O(SiO_{4})(Si_{2}O_{7})(OH)
  - Dollaseite-(Ce) – CaCeMg_{2}AlSi_{3}O_{11}F(OH)
- Vesuvianite (idocrase) – Ca_{10}(Mg,Fe)_{2}Al_{4}(SiO_{4})_{5}(Si_{2}O_{7})_{2}(OH)_{4}

== Cyclosilicates ==
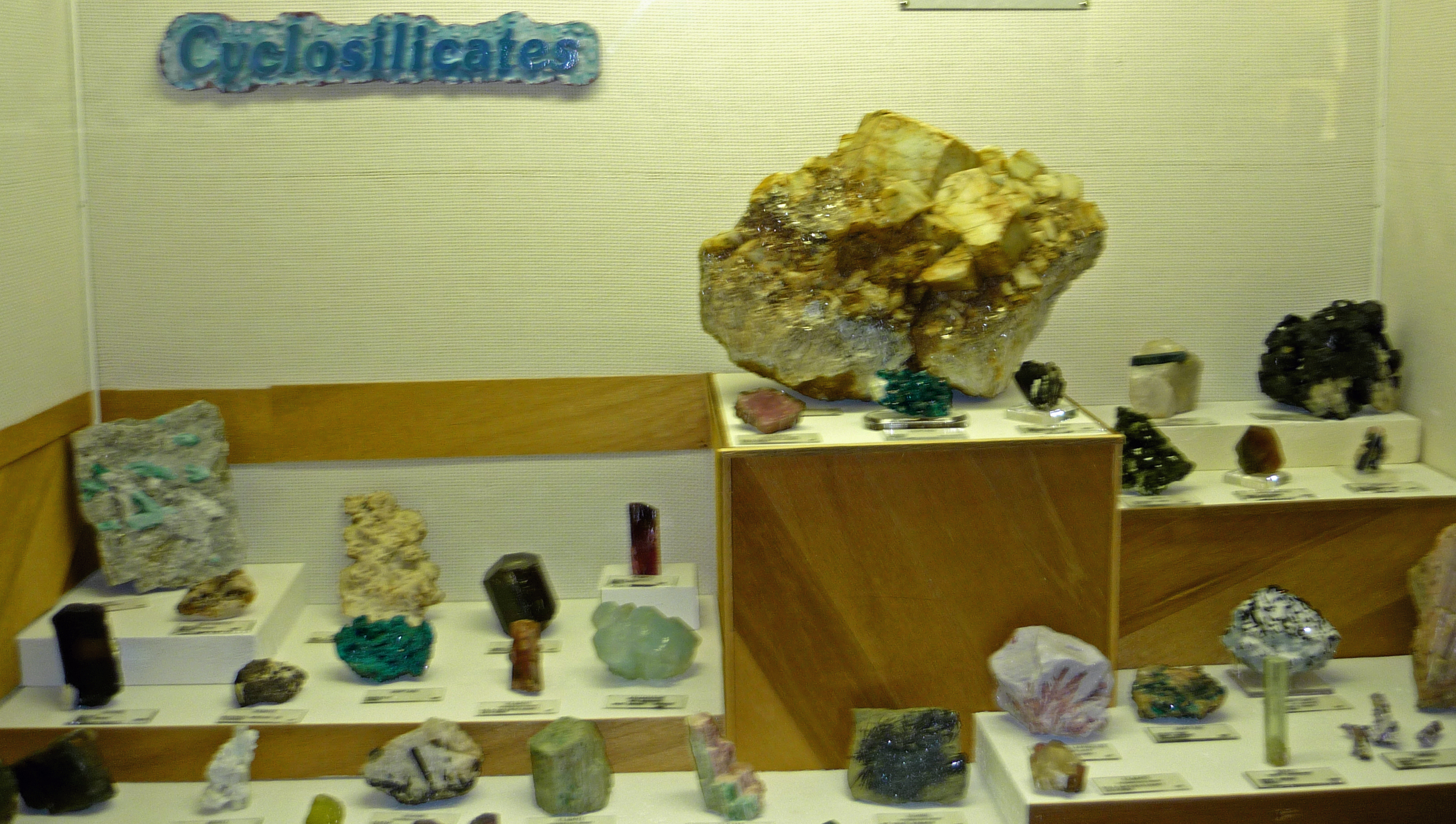
Cyclosilicate specimens at the Museum of Geology, South Dakota

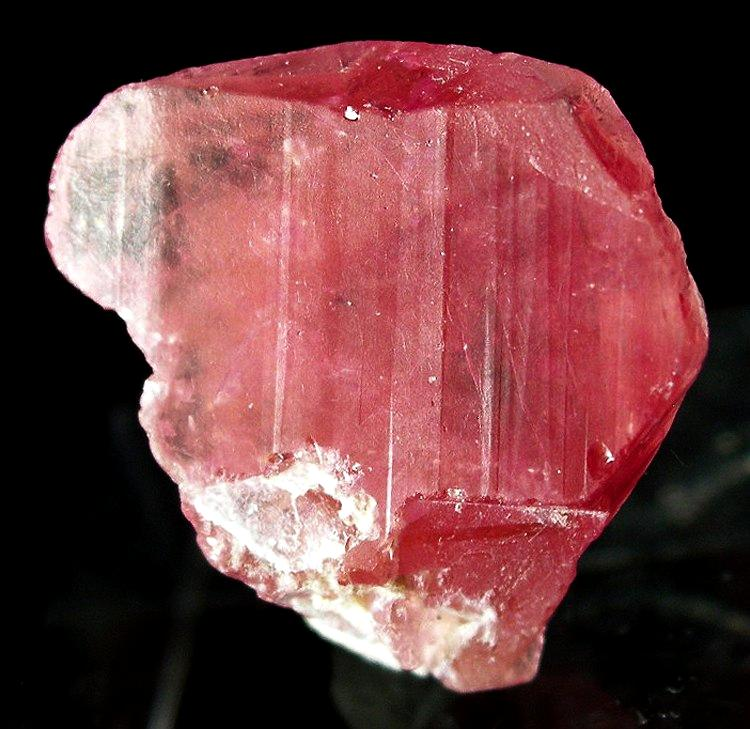
Pezzottaite

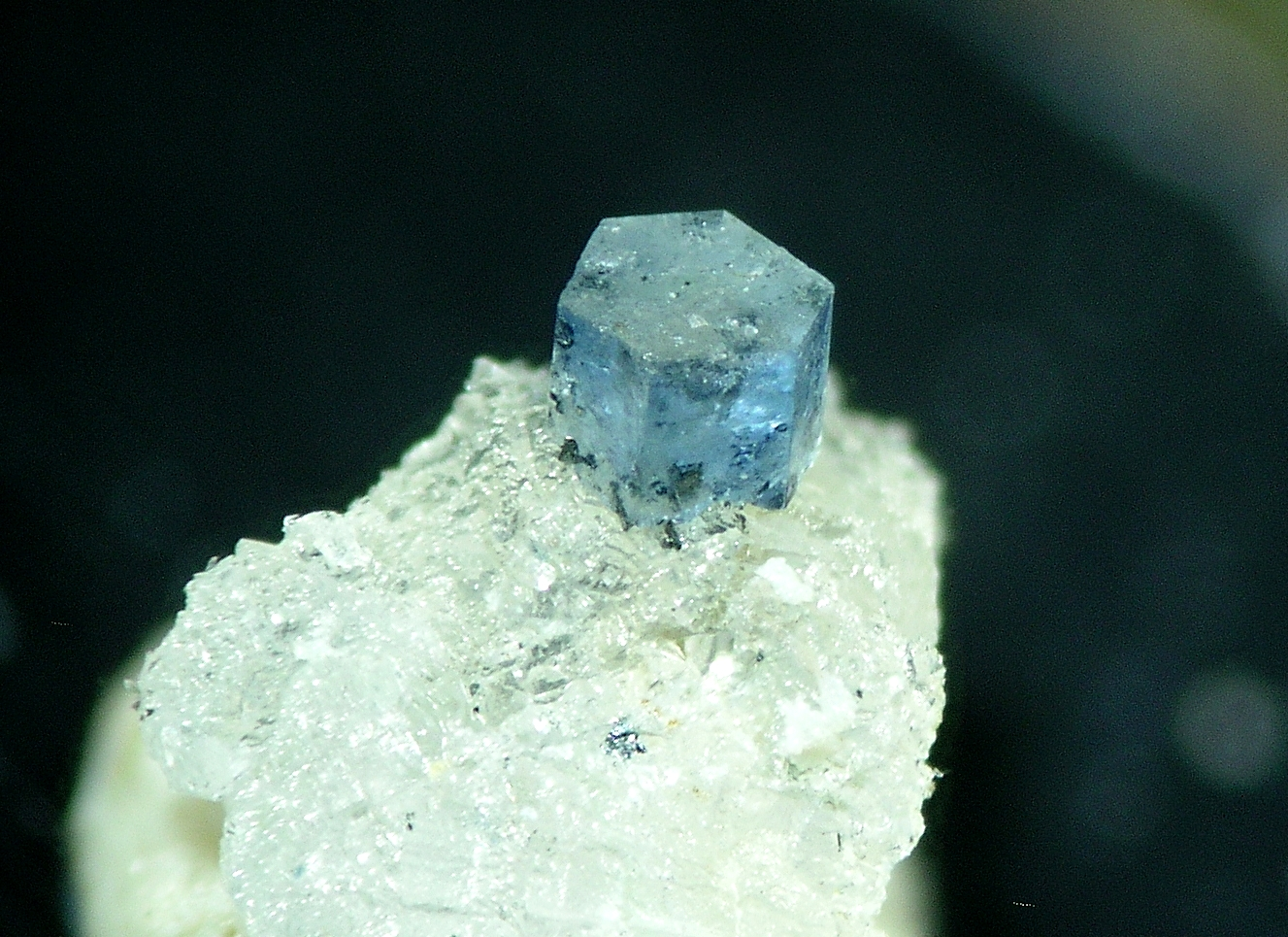
Bazzite

Cyclosilicates (from Greek κύκλος kýklos 'circle'), or ring silicates, have three or more tetrahedra linked in a ring. The general formula is (Si_{x}O_{3x})^{2x−}, where one or more silicon atoms can be replaced by other 4-coordinated atom(s). The silicon:oxygen ratio is 1:3. Double rings have the formula (Si_{2x}O_{5x})^{2x−} or a 2:5 ratio. The Nickel–Strunz classification is 09.C. Possible ring sizes include:

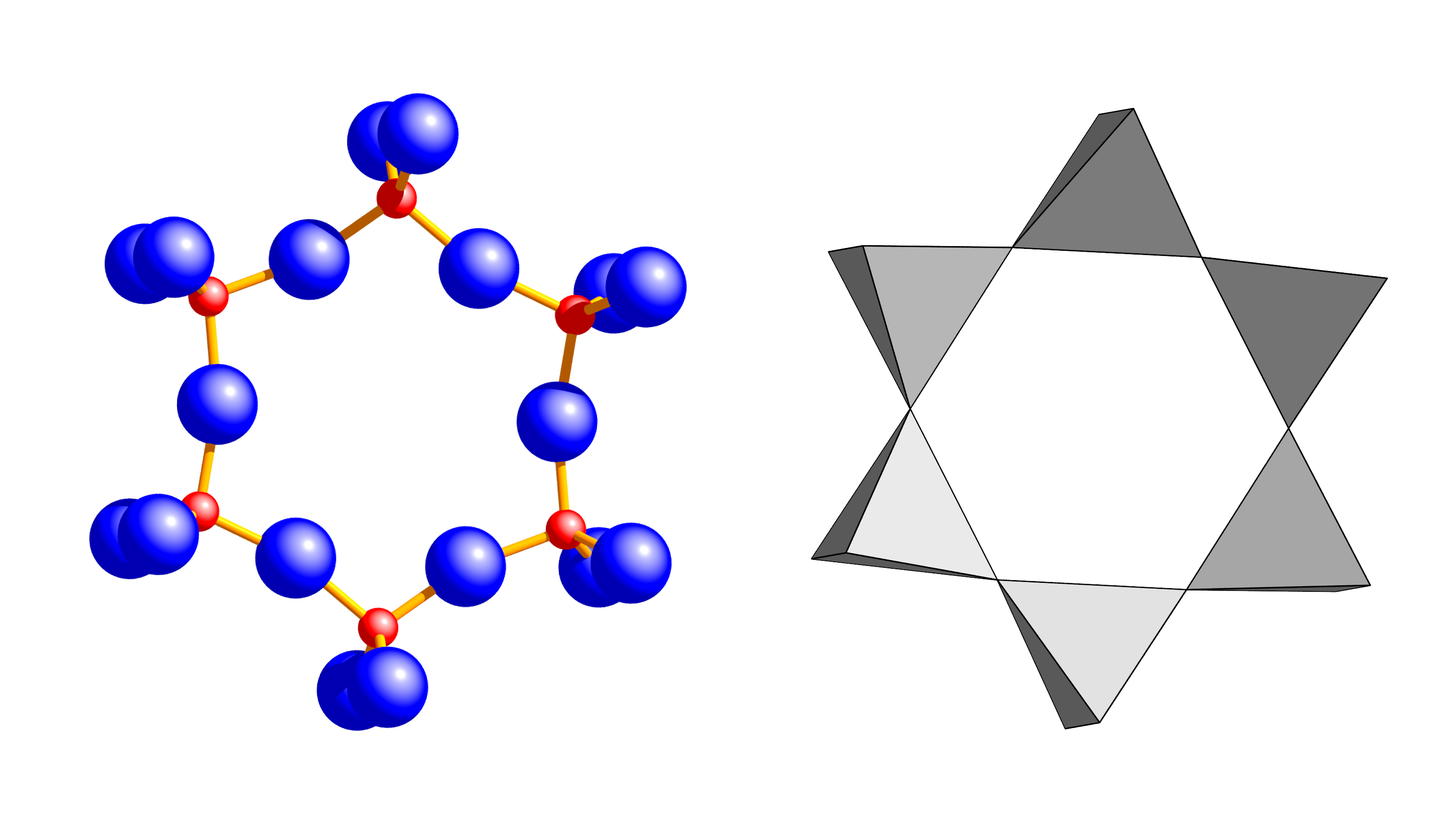
6 units [Si_{6}O_{18}], beryl (red: Si, blue: O)

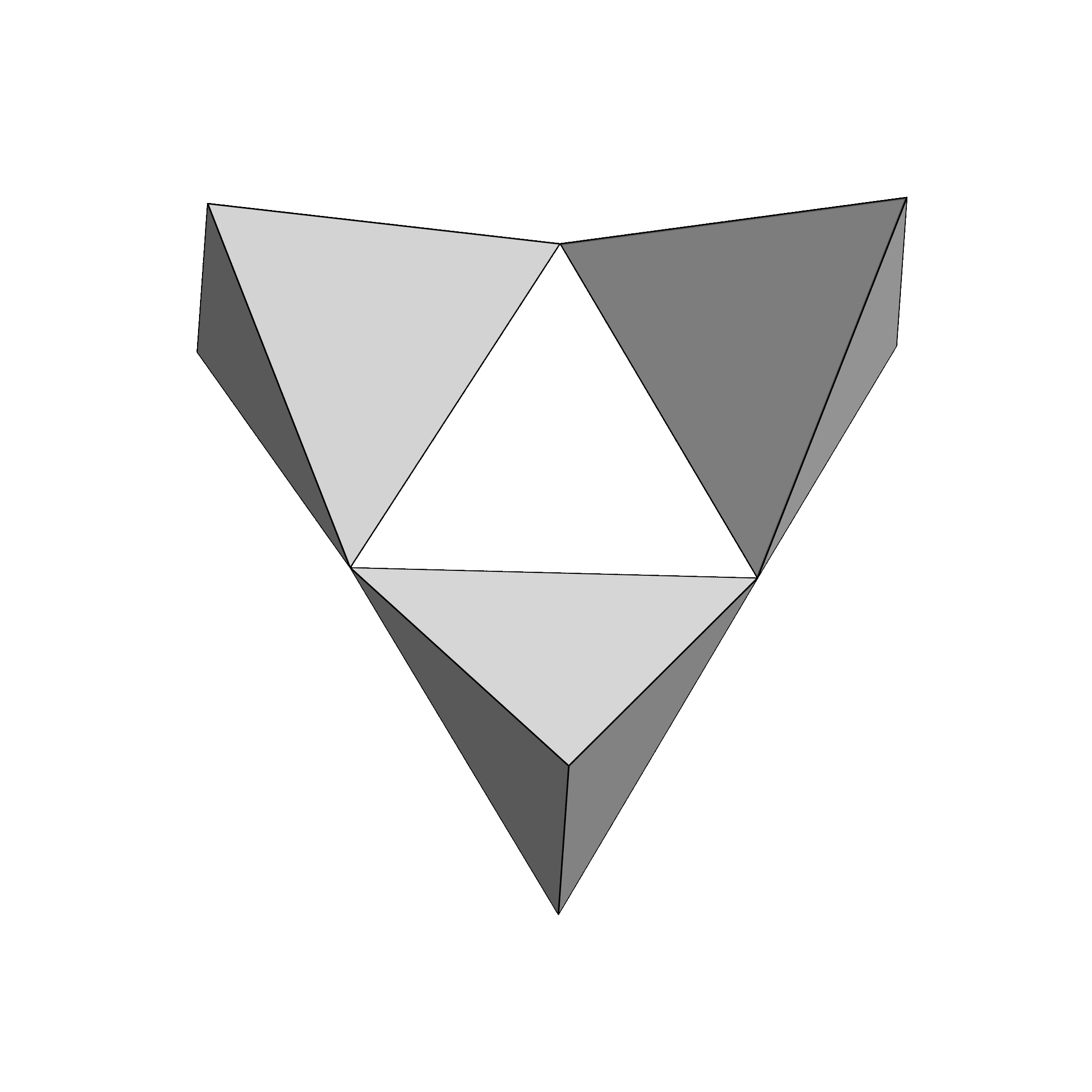
3 units [Si_{3}O_{9}], benitoite

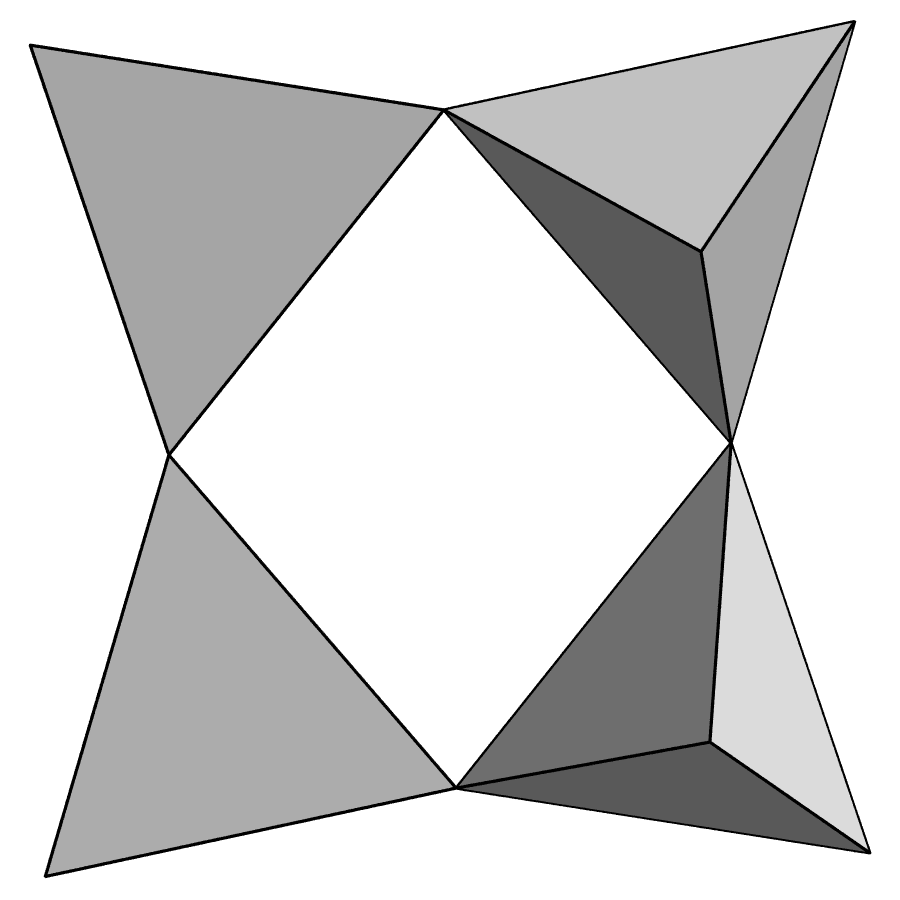
4 units [Si_{4}O_{12}], papagoite

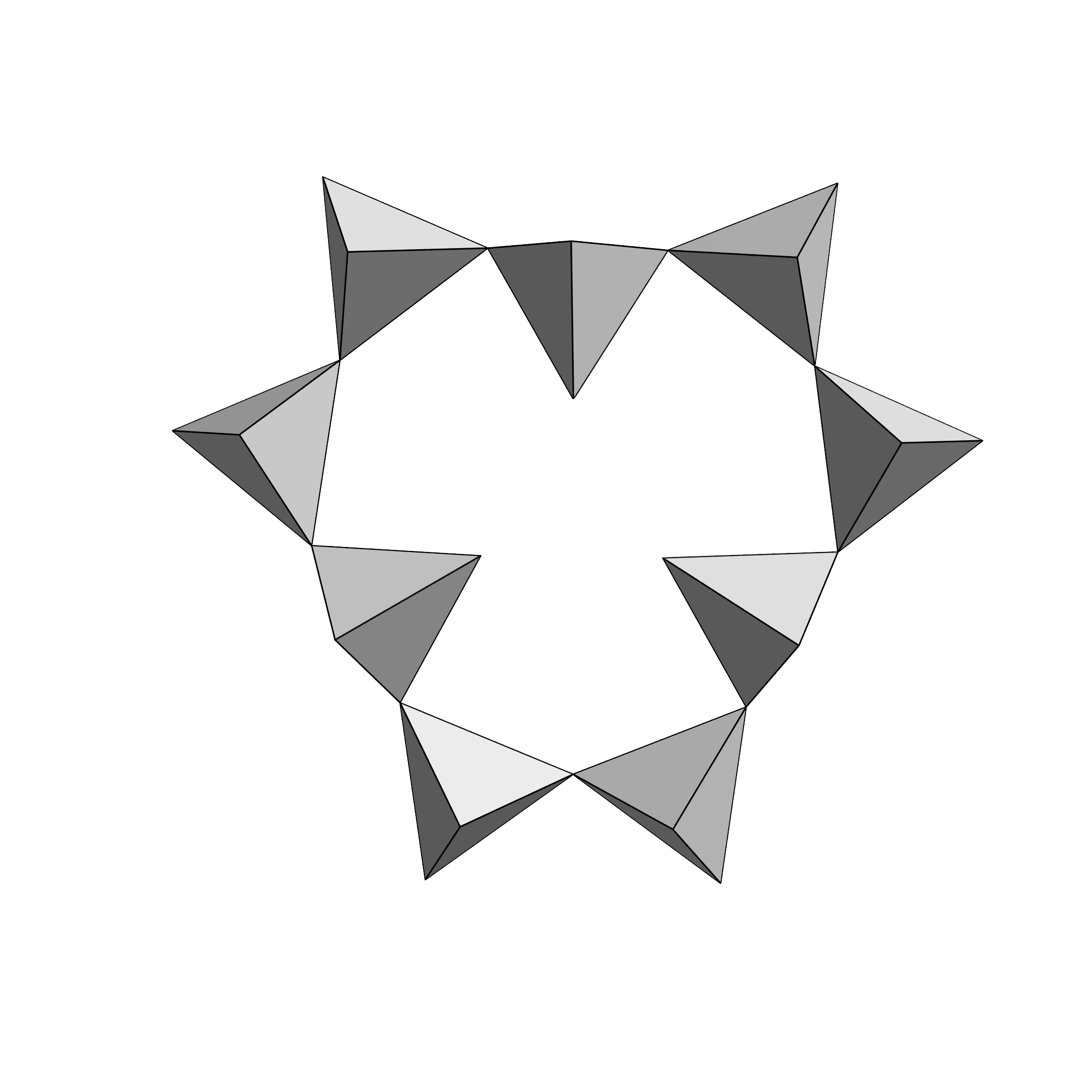
9 units [Si_{9}O_{27}], eudialyte

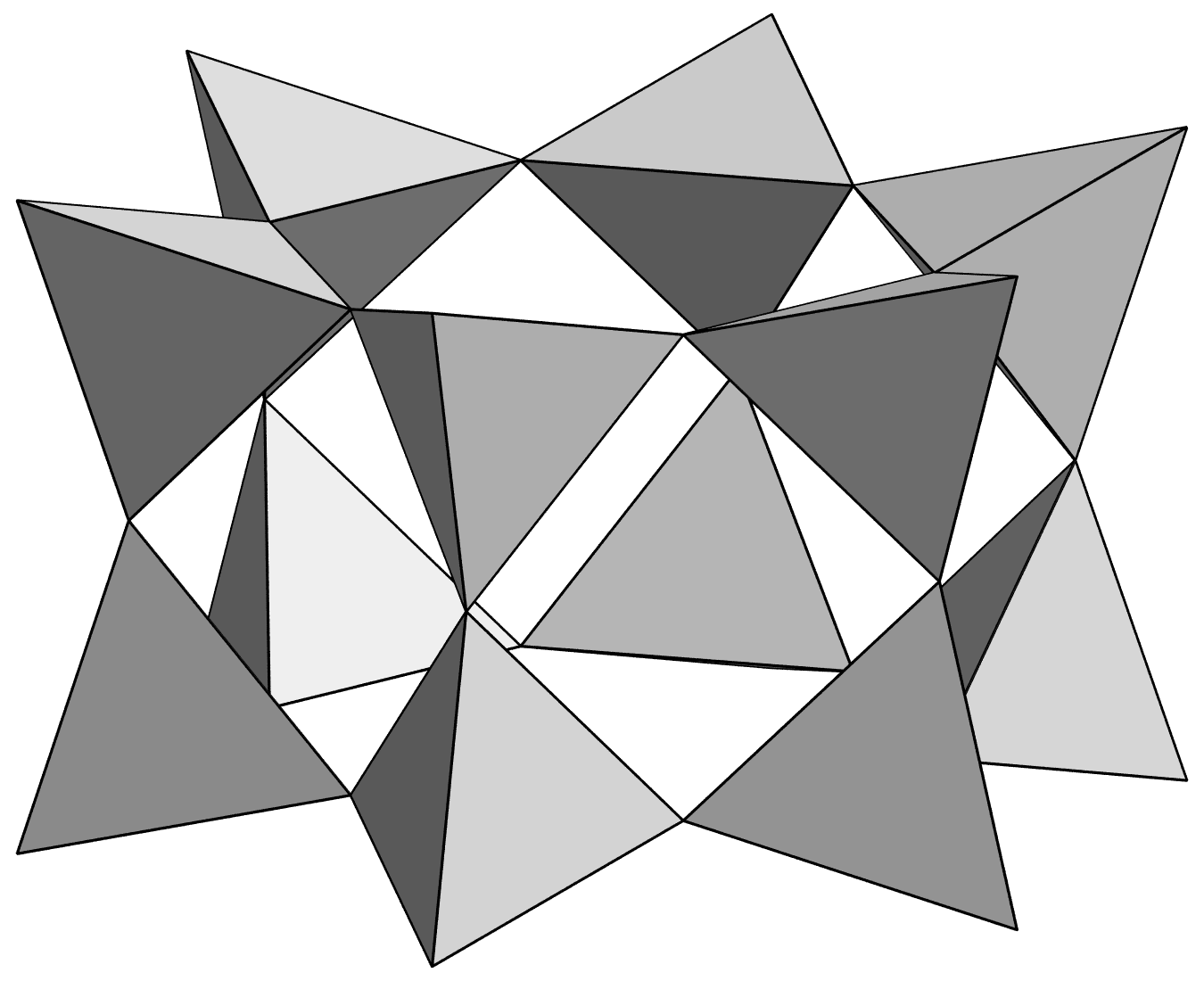
12 units, double ring [Si_{12}O_{30}], milarite

Some example minerals are:

- 3-member single ring
  - Benitoite – BaTi(Si_{3}O_{9})
- 4-member single ring
  - Papagoite – CaCuAlSi_{2}O_{6}(OH)_{3}.
- 6-member single ring
  - Beryl – Be_{3}Al_{2}(Si_{6}O_{18})
  - Bazzite – Be_{3}Sc_{2}(Si_{6}O_{18})
  - Sugilite – KNa_{2}(Fe,Mn,Al)_{2}Li_{3}Si_{12}O_{30}
  - Tourmaline – (Na,Ca)(Al,Li,Mg)_{3–}(Al,Fe,Mn)_{6}(Si_{6}O_{18})(BO_{3})_{3}(OH)_{4}
  - Pezzottaite – Cs(Be_{2}Li)Al_{2}Si_{6}O_{18}
  - Osumilite – (K,Na)(Fe,Mg)_{2}(Al,Fe)_{3}(Si,Al)_{12}O_{30}
  - Cordierite – (Mg,Fe)_{2}Al_{4}Si_{5}O_{18}
  - Sekaninaite – (Fe^{+2},Mg)_{2}Al_{4}Si_{5}O_{18}
- 9-member single ring
  - Eudialyte – Na_{15}Ca_{6}(Fe,Mn)_{3}Zr_{3}SiO(O,OH,H_{2}O)_{3}(Si_{3}O_{9})_{2}(Si_{9}O_{27})_{2}(OH,Cl)_{2}
- 6-member double ring
  - Milarite – K_{2}Ca_{4}Al_{2}Be_{4}(Si_{24}O_{60})H_{2}O

The ring in axinite contains two B and four Si tetrahedra and is highly distorted compared to the other 6-member ring cyclosilicates.

== Inosilicates ==
Inosilicates (from Greek ἴς is [genitive: ἰνός inos] 'fibre'), or chain silicates, have interlocking chains of silicate tetrahedra with either SiO_{3}, 1:3 ratio, for single chains or Si_{4}O_{11}, 4:11 ratio, for double chains. The Nickel–Strunz classification is 09.D – examples include:

=== Single chain inosilicates ===
- Pyroxene group
  - Clinopyroxene subgroup
    - Aegirine (or acmite) – NaFe^{3+}Si_{2}O_{6}
    - Augite – (Ca,Mg,Fe)_{2}Si_{2}O_{6}
    - Diopside – CaMgSi_{2}O_{6}
    - Hedenbergite – CaFe^{2+}Si_{2}O_{6}
    - Jadeite – Na(Al,Fe^{3+})Si_{2}O_{6}
    - Pigeonite – (Ca_{x}Mg_{y}Fe_{z})(Mg_{y1}Fe_{z1})Si_{2}O_{6}, where 0.1 ≤ x ≤ 0.4, x + y + z = 1 and y1 + z1 = 1
    - Spodumene – LiAlSi_{2}O_{6}
  - Orthopyroxene subgroup
    - Enstatite – Mg_{2}Si_{2}O_{6}
    - Ferrosilite – Fe^{2+}_{2}Si_{2}O_{6}
- Pyroxferroite - (Fe,Mn,Ca)SiO_{3}
- Rhodonite – CaMn_{3}Mn(Si_{5}O_{15})
- Wollastonite group
  - Pectolite – NaCa_{2}Si_{3}O_{8}(OH)
  - Wollastonite – Ca_{3}(Si_{3}O_{9})
  - Serandite – Na(Mn²⁺,Ca)₂Si₃O₈(OH)
  - Nambulite – LiMn₄Si₅O₁₄(OH)
  - Fowlerite – (Ca,Mn)₂Si₃O₈(OH)

=== Double chain inosilicates ===
- Amphibole group
  - Anthophyllite – (Mg,Fe)_{7}Si_{8}O_{22}(OH)_{2}
  - Cummingtonite series
    - Magnesiocummingtonite - Mg_{7}Si_{8}O_{22}(OH)_{2}
    - Cummingtonite – Fe_{2}Mg_{5}Si_{8}O_{22}(OH)_{2}
    - Grunerite – Fe_{7}Si_{8}O_{22}(OH)_{2}
  - Tremolite series
    - Tremolite – Ca_{2}Mg_{5}Si_{8}O_{22}(OH)_{2}
    - Actinolite – Ca_{2}(Mg,Fe)_{5}Si_{8}O_{22}(OH)_{2}
  - Hornblende – (Ca,Na)_{2–3}(Mg,Fe,Al)_{5}Si_{6}(Al,Si)_{2}O_{22}(OH)_{2}
  - Sodium amphibole group
    - Glaucophane – Na_{2}Mg_{3}Al_{2}Si_{8}O_{22}(OH)_{2}
    - Riebeckite (asbestos) – Na_{2}Fe^{II}_{3}Fe^{III}_{2}Si_{8}O_{22}(OH)_{2}
    - Arfvedsonite – Na_{3}(Fe,Mg)_{4}FeSi_{8}O_{22}(OH)_{2}
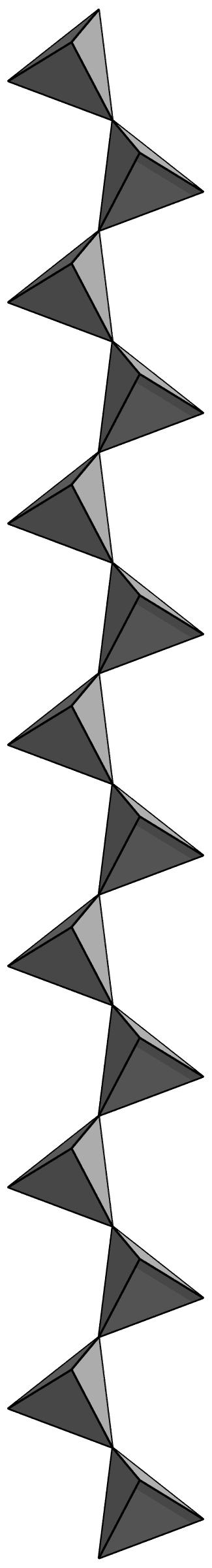
Inosilicate, pyroxene family, with 2-periodic single chain (Si_{2}O_{6}), diopside

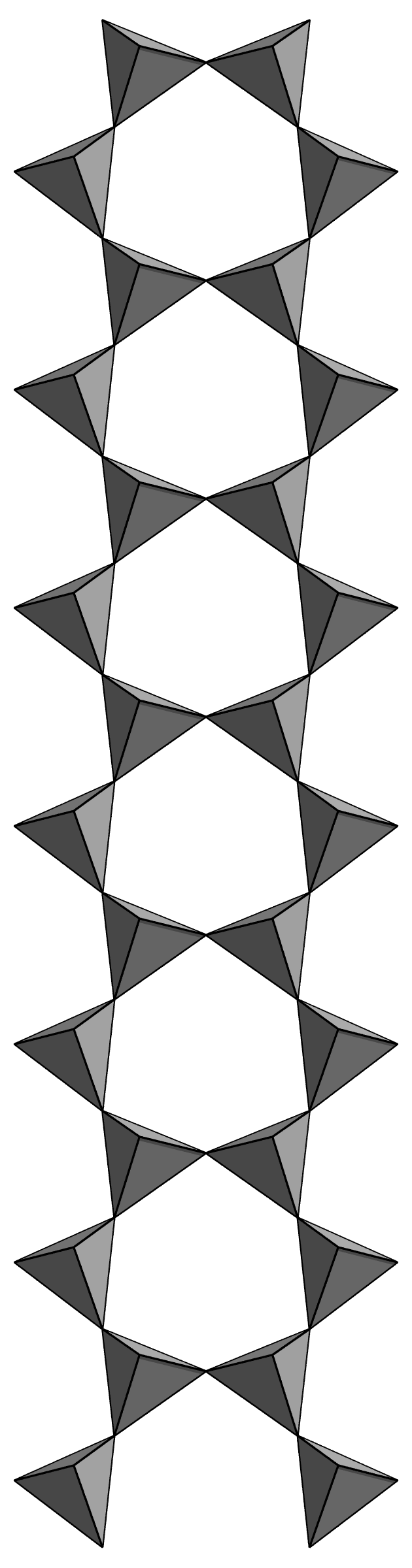
Inosilicate, clinoamphibole, with 2-periodic double chains (Si_{4}O_{11}), tremolite

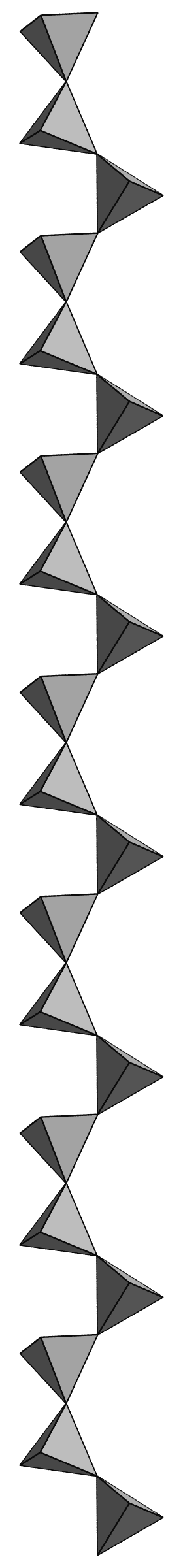
Inosilicate, unbranched 3-periodic single chain of wollastonite

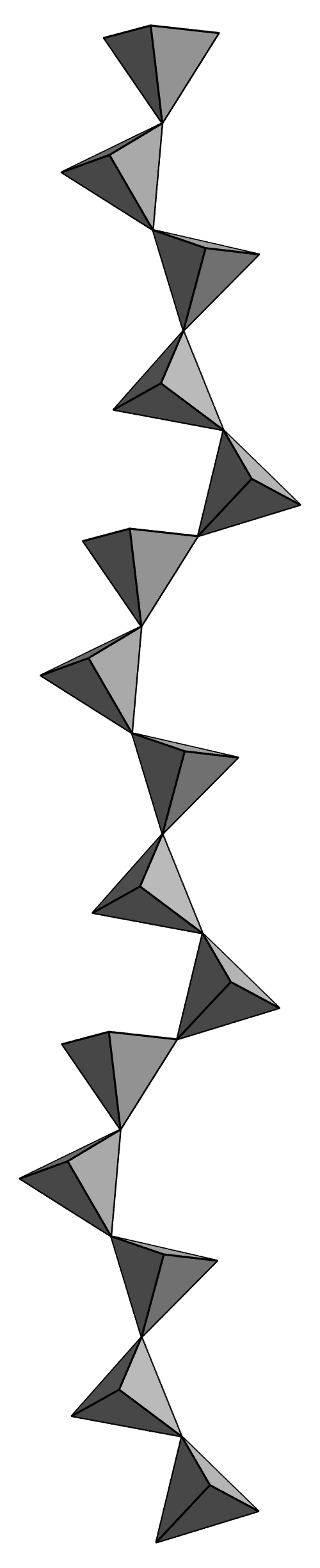
Inosilicate with 5-periodic single chain, rhodonite

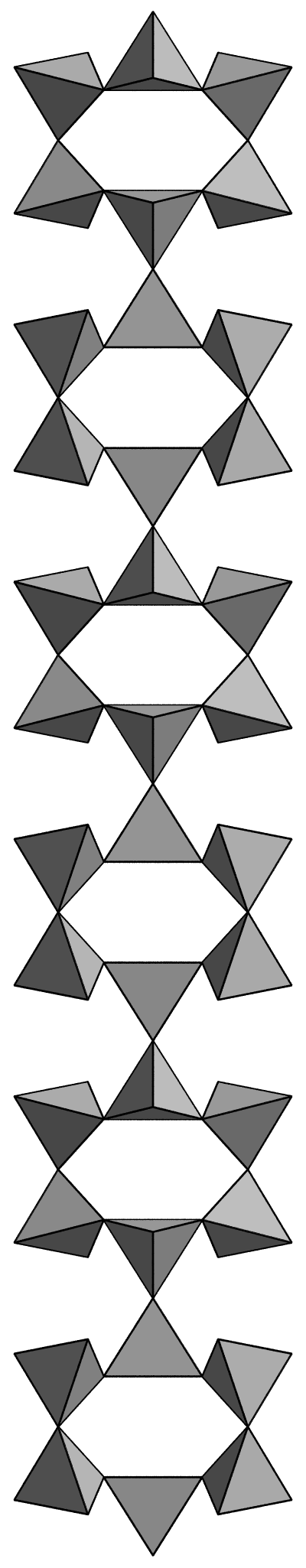
Inosilicate with cyclic branched 8-periodic chain, pellyite

== Phyllosilicates ==
Phyllosilicates (from Greek φύλλον phýllon 'leaf'), or sheet silicates, form parallel sheets of silicate tetrahedra with Si_{2}O_{5} in a 2:5 ratio. The Nickel–Strunz classification is 09.E. All phyllosilicate minerals are hydrated, with either water or hydroxyl groups attached. Many phyllosilicates are clay-forming and may be further classified as 1:1 clay minerals (one tetrahedral sheet and one octahedral sheet) and 2:1 clay minerals (one octahedral sheet between two tetrahedral sheets). Below are some major phyllosilicate mineral species and their chemical formulas, with group and series names in italics:

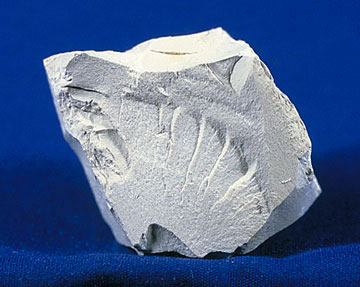
Kaolinite

- Ajoite – (K,Na)Cu_{7}AlSi_{9}O_{24}(OH)_{6}·3H_{2}O
- Apophyllite group
  - Fluorapophyllite-(K) – KCa_{4}(Si_{8}O_{22})F·8H_{2}O
- Bannisterite – (Ca,K,Na)(Mn^{2+},Fe^{2+})_{10}(Si,Al)_{16}O_{38}(OH)_{8}·nH_{2}O
- Carletonite – KNa_{4}Ca_{4}Si_{8}O_{18}(CO_{3})_{4}(OH,F)·H_{2}O
- Cavansite – Ca(VO)Si_{4}O_{10}·4H_{2}O (dimorph of pentagonite)
- Chlorite group – (Al,Fe^{2+},Fe^{3+}Li,Mg,Mn,Ni)_{5−6}(Al,Fe^{3+},Si)_{4}(O,OH)_{18} (2:1:1 clays)
  - Chamosite – (Fe^{2+},Mg,Al,Fe^{3+})_{6}(Si,Al)_{4}O_{10}(OH,O)_{8} (Fe endmember)
  - Clinochlore – Mg_{5}Al(AlSi_{3}O_{10})(OH)_{8} (Mg endmember)
  - Cookeite – (LiAl_{4}◻)[AlSi_{3}O_{10}](OH)_{8}
- Chrysocolla – Cu_{2−x}Alx(H_{2−x}Si_{2}O_{5})(OH)_{4}·nH_{2}O, x < 1
- Ekanite – Ca_{2}ThSi_{8}O_{20}
- Gyrolite – NaCa_{16}Si_{23}AlO_{60}(OH)_{8}·14H_{2}O
- Hisingerite – Fe^{3+}_{2}(Si_{2}O_{5})(OH)_{4}·2H_{2}O
- Imogolite – Al_{2}SiO_{3}(OH)_{4}
- Kaolinite-Serpentine group
  - Greenalite – (Fe^{2+},Fe^{3+})_{2−3}Si_{2}O_{5}(OH)_{4}
  - Kaolinite subgroup (1:1 clays)
    - Dickite – Al_{2}(Si_{2}O_{5})(OH)_{4}
    - Kaolinite – Al_{2}Si_{2}O_{5}(OH)_{4}
    - Halloysite – Al_{2}Si_{2}O_{5}(OH)_{4}
  - Serpentine subgroup
    - Amesite – Mg_{2}Al(AlSiO_{5})(OH)_{4}
    - Antigorite – Mg_{3}Si_{2}O_{5}(OH)_{4}
    - Chrysotile – Mg_{3}Si_{2}O_{5}(OH)_{4}
    - Lizardite – Mg_{3}Si_{2}O_{5}(OH)_{4}
- Mica group
  - Brittle mica group
    - Clintonite – CaAlMg_{2}(SiAl_{3}O_{10})(OH)_{2}
    - Margarite – CaAl_{2}(Al_{2}Si_{2})O_{10}(OH)_{2}
  - Dioctahedral mica group
    - Celadonite subgroup
      - Celadonite – K(MgFe^{3+}◻)(Si_{4}O_{10})(OH)_{2}
    - Glauconite – K_{0.60−0.85}(Fe^{3+},Mg,Al)_{2}(Si,Al)_{4}O_{10}](OH)_{2}
    - Muscovite – KAl_{2}(AlSi_{3})O_{10}(OH)_{2}
    - Paragonite – NaAl_{2}(AlSi_{3}O_{10})(OH)_{2}
    - Roscoelite – K(V^{3+},Al)_{2}(AlSi_{3}O_{10})(OH)_{2}
  - Trioctahedral mica group
    - Aspidolite – NaMg_{3}(AlSi_{3}O_{10})(OH)_{2}
    - Biotite subgroup – K(Fe^{2+},Mg)_{2}(Al,Fe^{3+},Mg,Ti)([Si,Al,Fe]_{2}Si_{2}O_{10})(OH,F)_{2}
      - Annite – KFe^{2+}_{3}(AlSi_{3}O_{10})(OH)_{2} (Fe endmember)
      - Phlogopite – KMg_{3}(AlSi_{3})O_{10}(OH)_{2} (Mg endmember)
    - Lepidolite (polylithionite-trilithionite series) – K(Li_{2},Li_{1.5}Al_{1.5})AlSi_{3−4}O_{10}(F,OH)_{2}
    - Zinnwaldite series – KFe^{2+}_{2}Al(Al_{2}Si_{2}O_{10})(OH)_{2}
- Neptunite – KNa_{2}Li(Fe^{2+})_{2}Ti_{2}[Si_{4}O_{12}]_{2}
- Okenite – Ca_{10}Si_{18}O_{46}·18H_{2}O
- Palygorskite group (2:1 clays)
  - Palygorskite – ◻Al_{2}Mg_{2}◻_{2}Si_{8}O_{20}(OH)_{2}(H_{2}O)_{4}·4H_{2}O
  - Tuperssuatsiaite – Fe^{3+}Fe^{3+}_{2}(Na◻)◻_{2}Si_{8}O_{20}(OH)_{2}(H_{2}O)_{4}·2H_{2}O
- Pentagonite – Ca(VO)Si_{4}O_{10}·4H_{2}O (dimorph of cavansite)
- Pyrophyllite-Talc group
  - Pyrophyllite – Al_{2}Si_{4}O_{10}(OH)_{2}
  - Talc – Mg_{3}Si_{4}O_{10}(OH)_{2} (2:1 clay)
- Sepiolite group
  - Sepiolite – Mg_{4}(Si_{6}O_{15})(OH)_{2}·6H_{2}O (2:1 clay)
  - Falcondoite – (Ni,Mg)_{4}Si_{6}O_{15}(OH)_{2}·6H_{2}O (Ni analogue of sepiolite)
- Smectite group (2:1 clays)
  - Hectorite – Na_{0.3}(Mg,Li)_{3}(Si_{4}O_{10})(F,OH)_{2}
  - Montmorillonite – (Na,Ca)_{0.33}(Al,Mg)_{2}(Si_{4}O_{10})(OH)_{2}·nH_{2}O
  - Nontronite – Na_{0.3}Fe_{2}((Si,Al)_{4}O_{10})(OH)_{2}·nH_{2}O
  - Saponite – Ca_{0.25}(Mg,Fe)_{3}((Si,Al)_{4}O_{10})(OH)_{2}·nH_{2}O
  - Stevensite – (Ca,Na)_{x}Mg_{3−x}(Si_{4}O_{10})(OH)_{2}
- Stilpnomelane group
  - Stilpnomelane – (K,Ca,Na)(Fe,Mg,Al)_{8}(Si,Al)_{12}(O,OH)_{36}·nH_{2}O
- Vermiculite – Mg_{0.7}(Mg,Fe,Al)_{6}(Si,Al)_{8}O_{20}(OH)_{4}·8H_{2}O (2:1 clay)
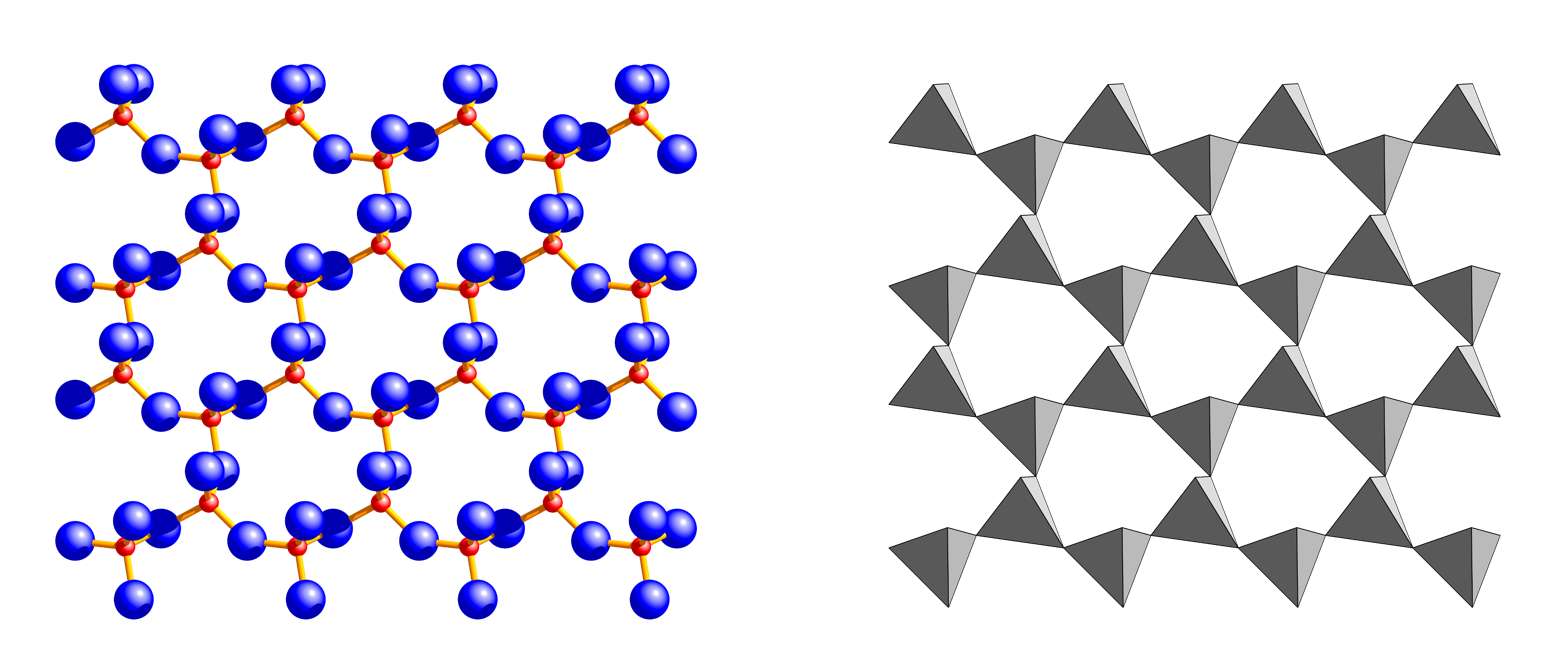
Phyllosilicate, mica group, muscovite (red: Si, blue: O)

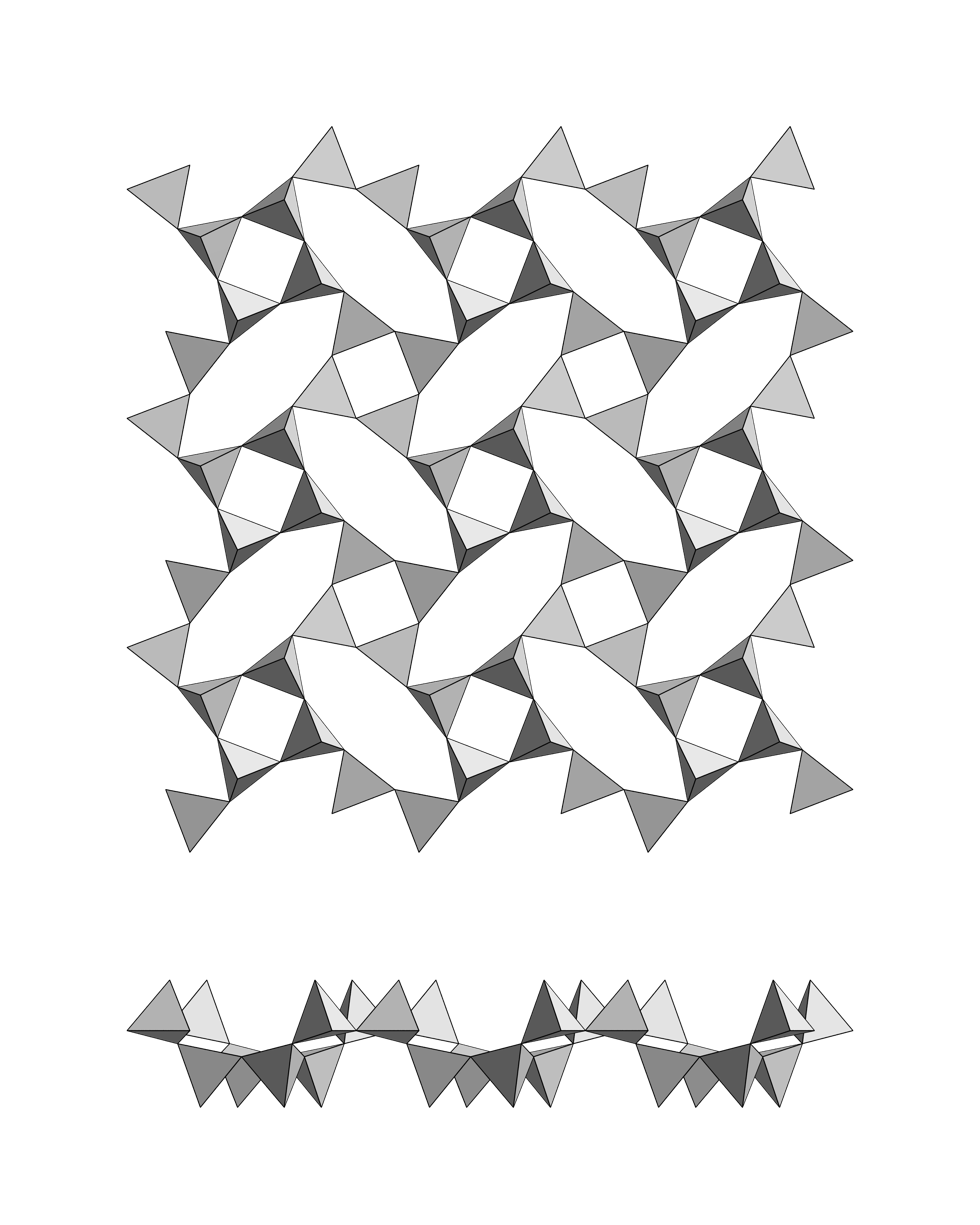
Phyllosilicate, single net of tetrahedra with 4-membered rings, apophyllite group

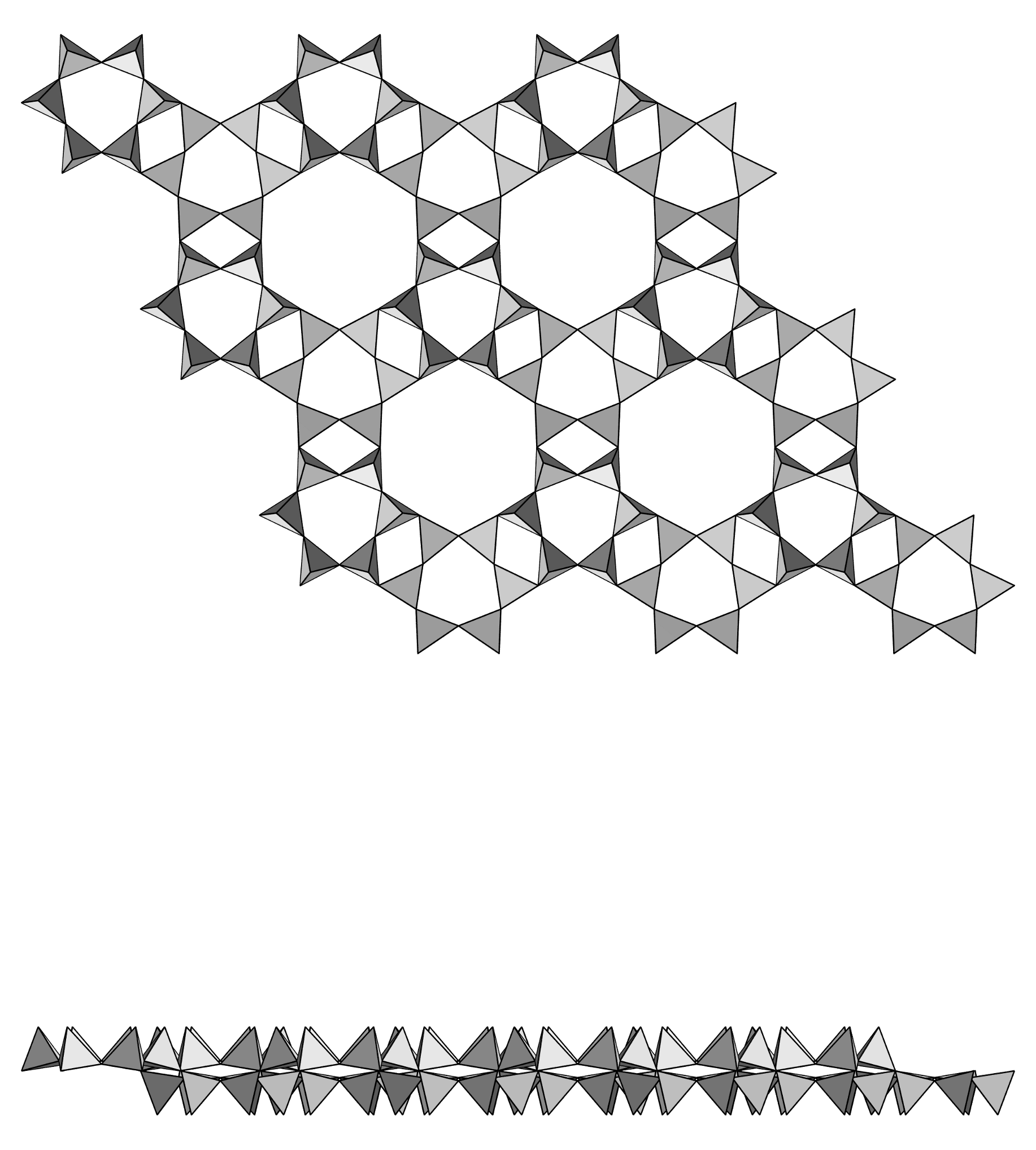
Phyllosilicate, single tetrahedral nets of 6-membered rings, pyrosmalite-(Fe)-pyrosmalite-(Mn) series

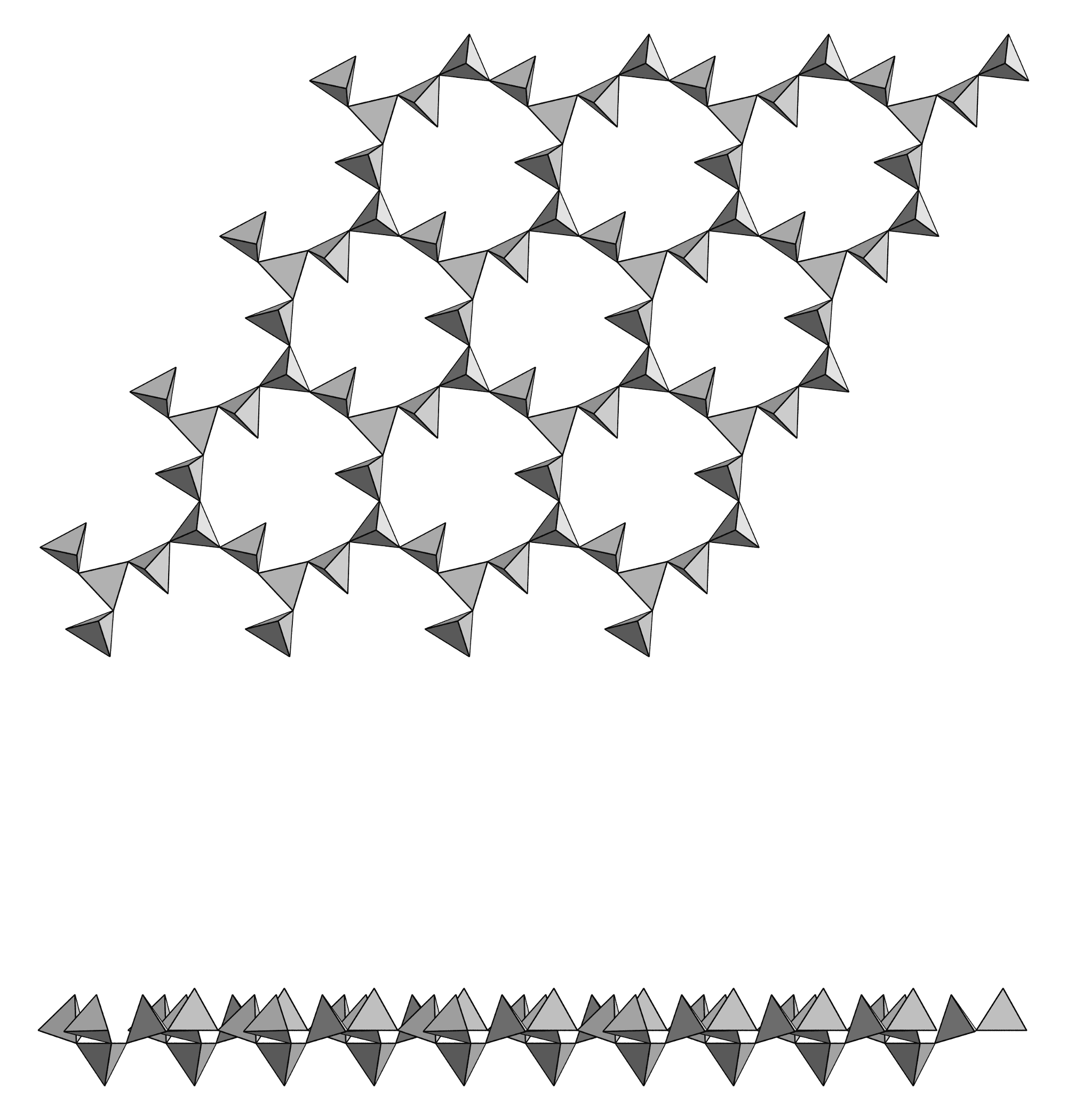
Phyllosilicate, single tetrahedral nets of 6-membered rings, zeophyllite

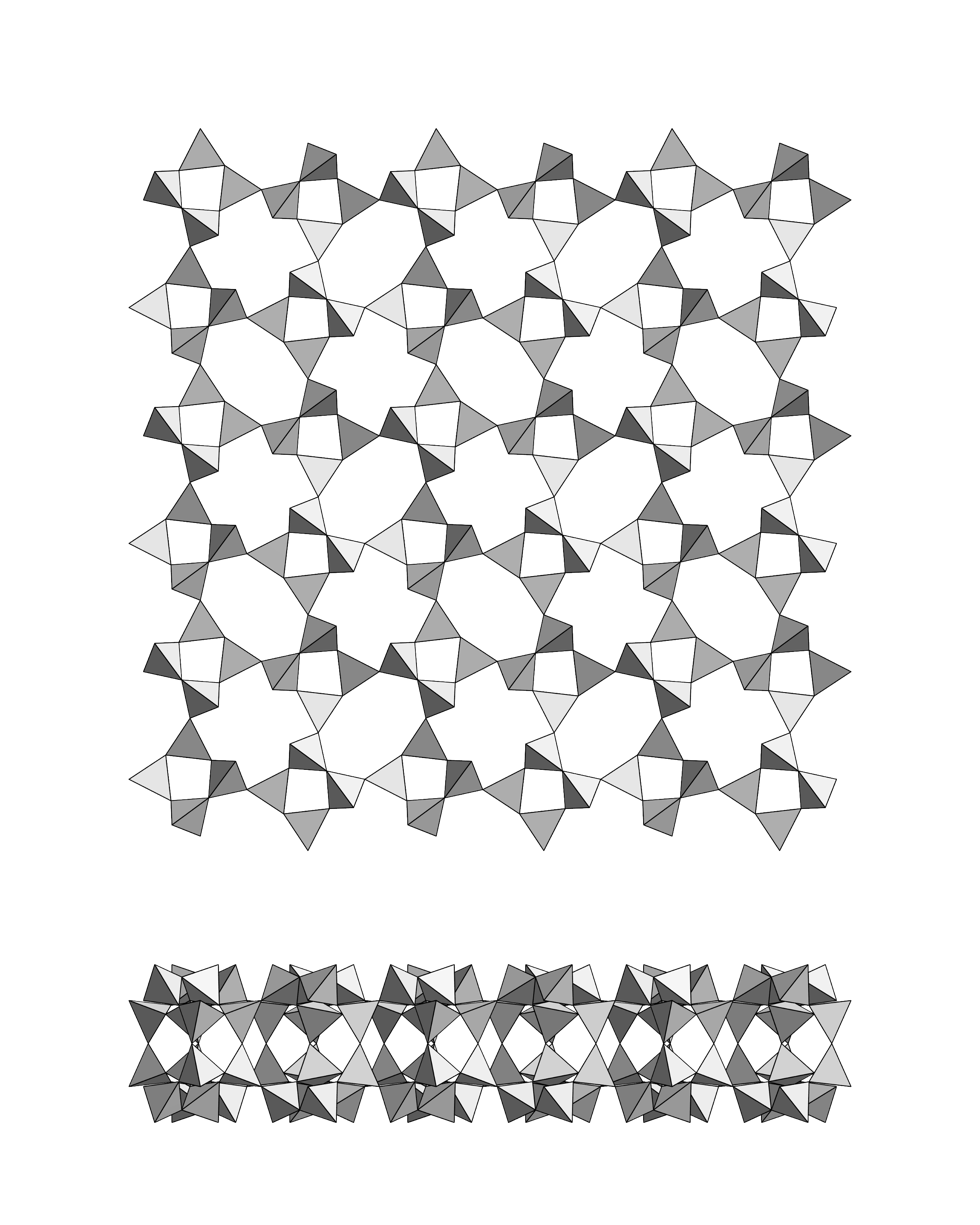
Phyllosilicate, double nets with 4- and 6-membered rings, carletonite

== Tectosilicates ==
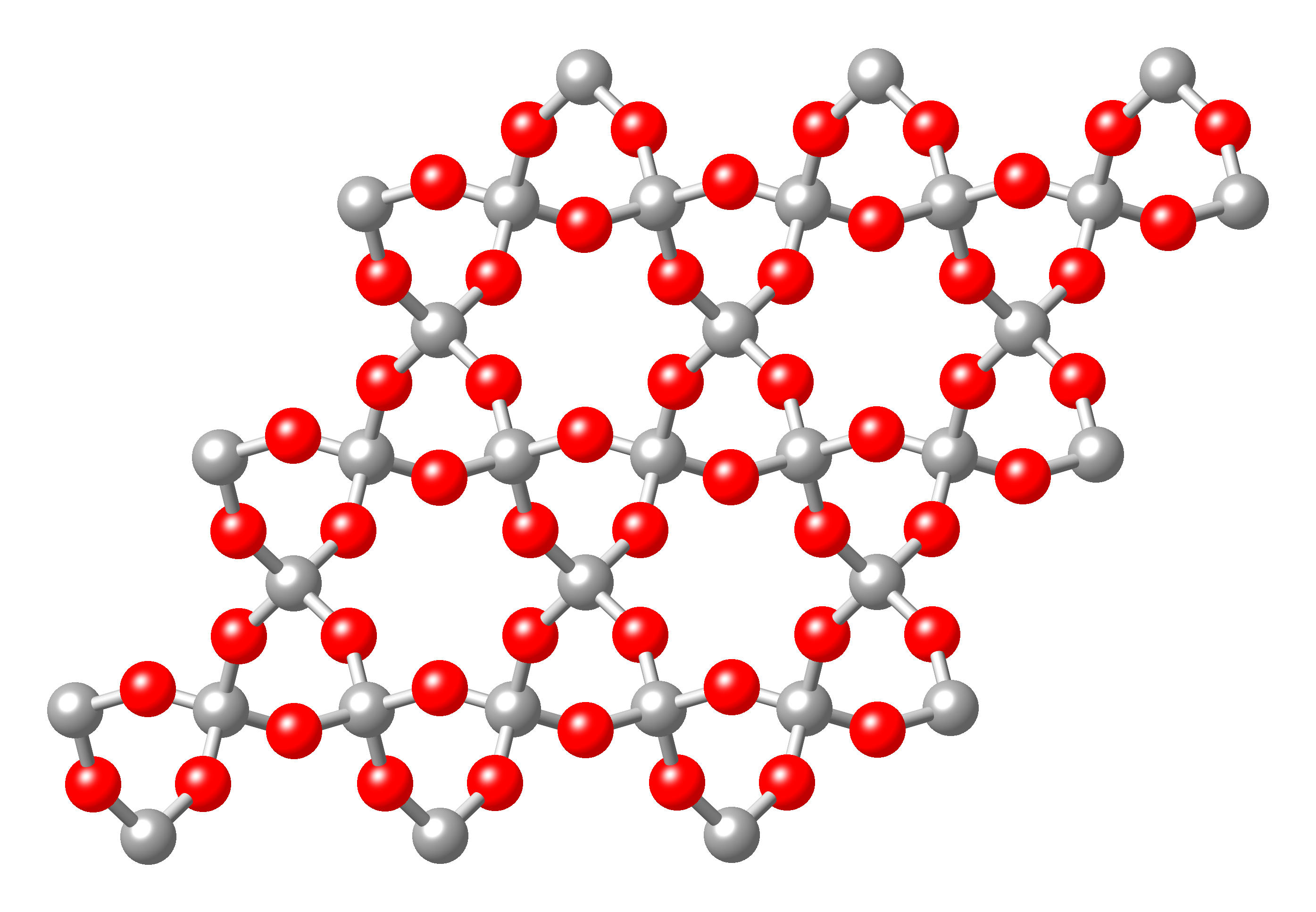
Silica family (SiO_{2} 3D network), β-quartz

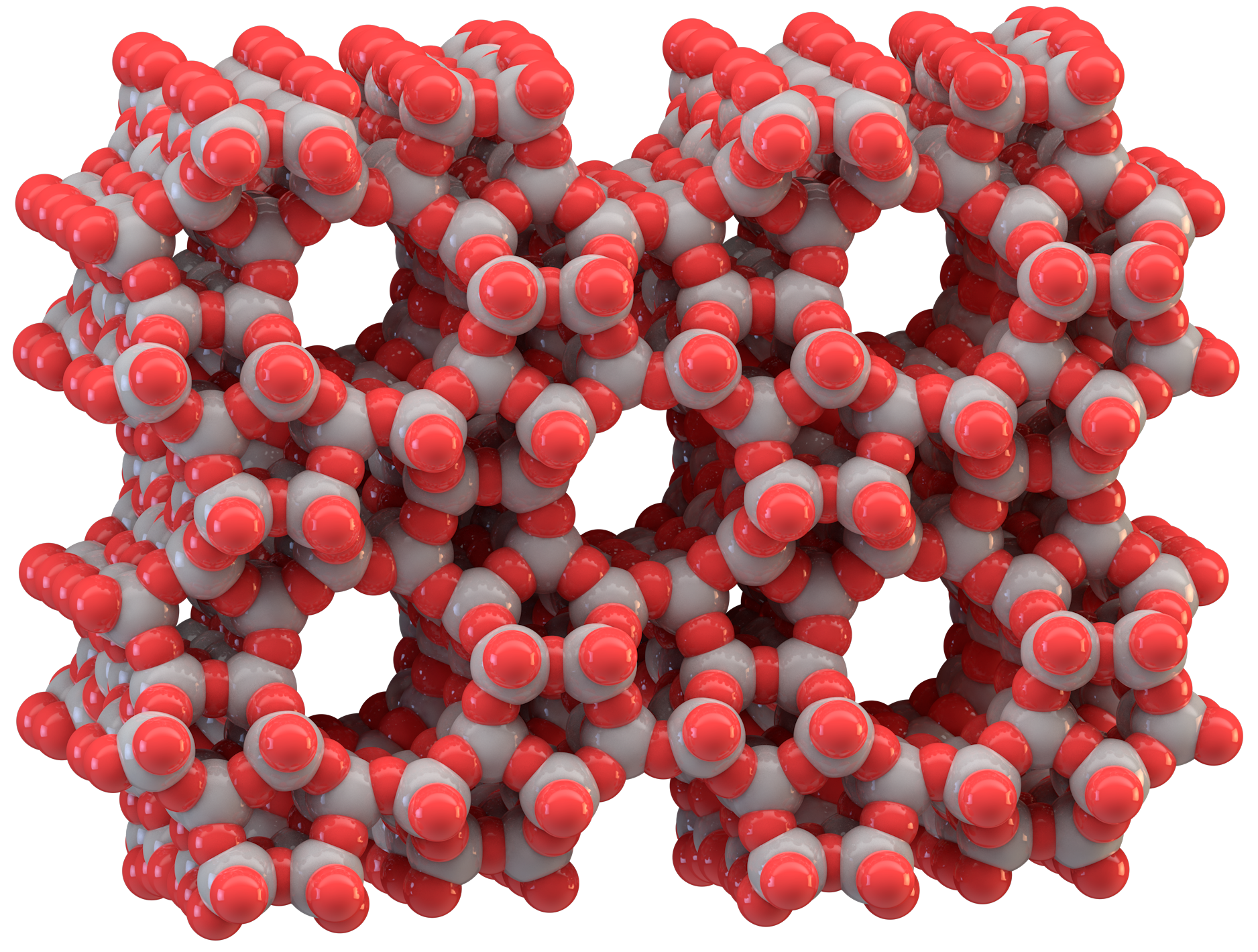
Aluminosilicate family, the 3D model of synthetic zeolite ZSM-5

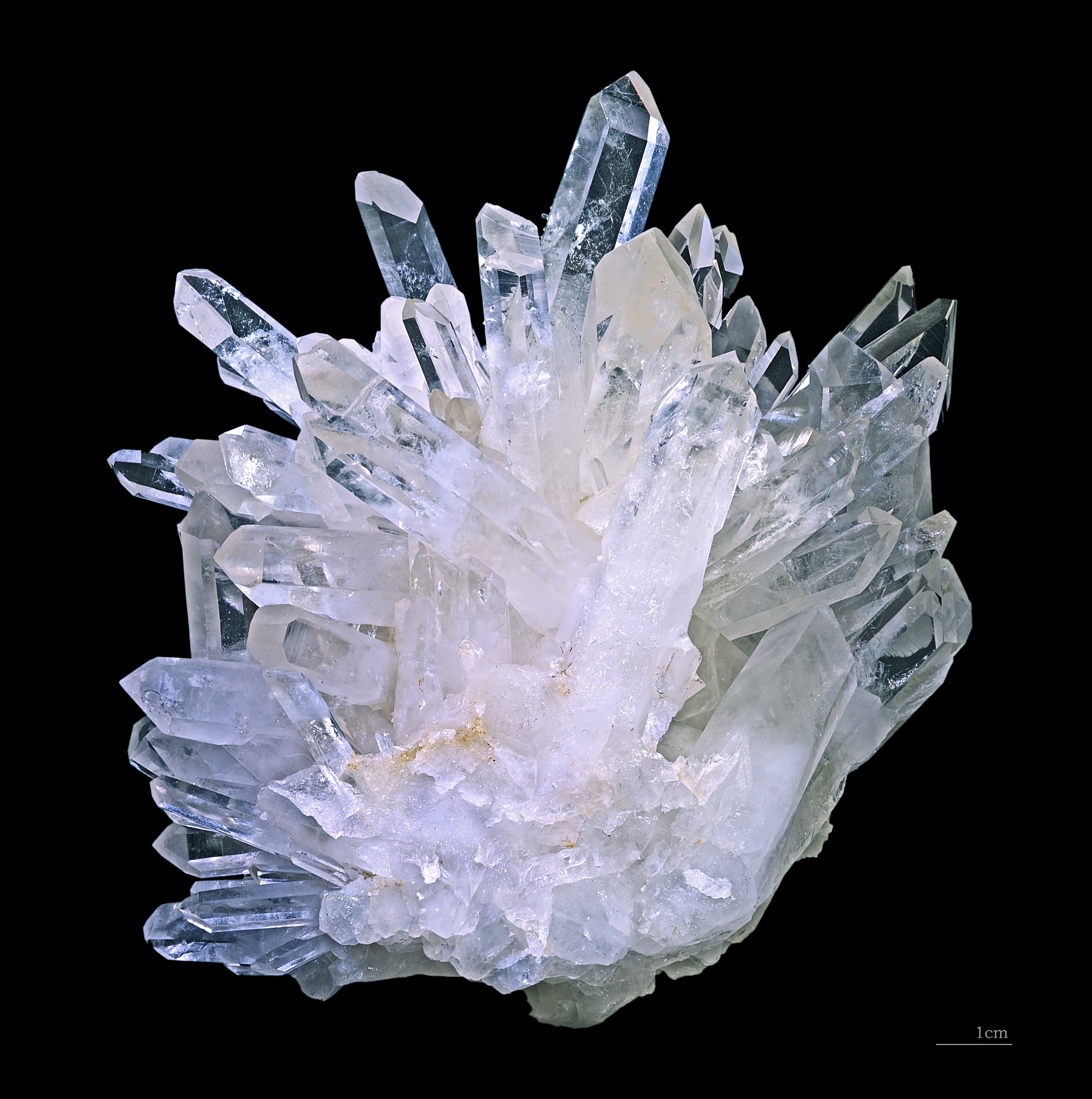
Quartz

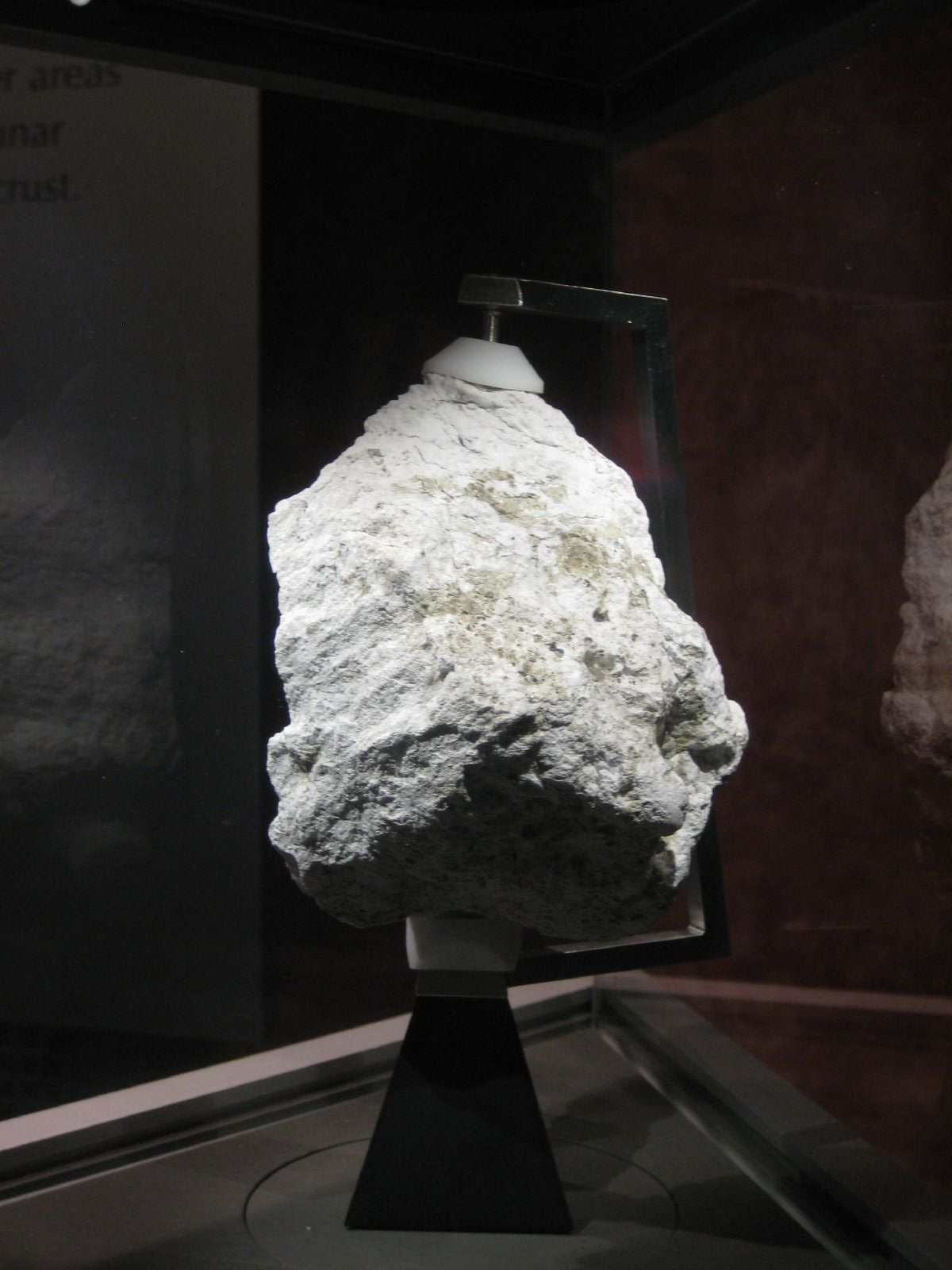
Lunar ferroan anorthosite (plagioclase feldspar) collected by Apollo 16 astronauts from the Lunar Highlands near Descartes Crater

Tectosilicates, or "framework silicates," have a three-dimensional framework of silicate tetrahedra with SiO_{2} in a 1:2 ratio. This group comprises nearly 75% of the crust of the Earth. Tectosilicates, with the exception of the quartz group, are aluminosilicates. The Nickel–Strunz classifications are 9.F (tectosilicates without zeolitic H_{2}O), 9.G (tectosilicates with zeolitic H_{2}O), and 4.DA (quartz/silica group). Below are some major tectosilicate mineral species and their chemical formulas, with group and series names in italics:

- Quartz group (silica) – SiO_{2}
  - Chalcedony – cryptocrystalline variety of silica composed mostly of quartz with some moganite
  - Polymorphs of silica
    - α-quartz – trigonal, "normal" quartz under 573 °C (846 K; 1,063 °F)
    - β-quartz – hexagonal, high-temperature quartz
    - Coesite – monoclinic
    - Cristobalite – tetragonal
    - Melanophlogite – cubic or tetragonal, rare
    - Moganite – monoclinic
    - Stishovite – tetragonal, extremely hard and dense
    - Tridymite – orthorhombic
- Feldspar group
  - Alkali feldspar series (potassium feldspars or K-spar)
    - Microcline – KAlSi_{3}O_{8}
    - Orthoclase – KAlSi_{3}O_{8}
    - Anorthoclase – (Na,K)AlSi_{3}O_{8}
    - Sanidine – KAlSi_{3}O_{8}
  - Plagioclase feldspar series
    - Albite – NaAlSi_{3}O_{8} (Na endmember)
    - Oligoclase – (Na,Ca)Al(Si,Al)Si_{2}O_{8} (Na:Ca 90:10 to 70:30)
    - Andesine – (Na,Ca)Al(Si,Al)Si_{2}O_{8} (Na:Ca 50:50 to 70:30)
    - Labradorite – (Ca,Na)Al(Al,Si)Si_{2}O_{8} (Na:Ca 30:70 to 50:50)
    - Bytownite – (Ca,Na)Al(Al,Si)Si_{2}O_{8} (Na:Ca 10:90 to 30:70)
    - Anorthite – CaAl_{2}Si_{2}O_{8} (Ca endmember)
  - Other feldspars
    - Buddingtonite — NH_{4}AlSi_{3}O_{8}
    - Celsian – BaAl_{2}Si_{2}O_{8}
    - Hyalophane – (K,Ba)[Al(Si,Al)Si_{2}O_{8}]
- Feldspathoid group
  - Cancrinite subgroup
    - Afghanite – (Na,K)_{22}Ca_{10}[Si_{24}Al_{24}O_{96}](SO_{4})_{6}Cl_{6}
    - Cancrinite – (Na,Ca,◻)_{8}(Al_{6}Si_{6}O_{24})(CO_{3},SO_{4})_{2}·2H_{2}O
    - Sacrofanite – (Na_{61}K_{19}Ca_{32})(Si_{84}Al_{84}O_{336})(SO_{4})_{26}Cl_{2}F_{6}·2H_{2}O
  - Leucite – K(AlSi_{2}O_{6})
  - Nepheline subgroup
    - Nepheline – Na_{3}K(Al_{4}Si_{4}O_{16})
  - Sodalite subgroup
    - Hauyne – Na_{3}Ca(Si_{3}Al_{3})O_{12}(SO_{4})
    - Lazurite – Na_{7}Ca(Al_{6}Si_{6}O_{24})(SO_{4})(S_{3})·H_{2}O
    - Nosean – Na_{8}(Al_{6}Si_{6}O_{24})(SO_{4})·H_{2}O
    - Sodalite – Na_{4}(Si_{3}Al_{3})O_{12}Cl
    - Tugtupite – Na_{4}(BeAlSi_{4}O_{12})Cl
- Scapolite group
  - Marialite – Na_{4}Al_{3}Si_{9}O_{24}Cl
  - Meionite – Ca_{4}Al_{6}Si_{6}O_{24}CO_{3}
- Zeolite group
  - Amicite – K_{2}Na_{2}Al_{4}Si_{4}O_{16}·5H_{2}O
  - Analcime – Na(AlSi_{2}O_{6})·H_{2}O
  - Brewsterite subgroup – (Ba,Sr,Ca)Al_{2}Si_{6}O_{16}·5H_{2}O
  - Chabazite-Lévyne subgroup
    - Chabazite – M[Al_{2}Si_{4}O_{12}]·6H_{2}O
    - Lévyne – (Ca_{1−2},Na_{1−2},K_{2})Al_{2}Si_{4}O_{12}·6H_{2}O
  - Clinoptilolite subgroup – (Na,Ca,K)_{3−6}(Al_{6−7}Si_{29−30}O_{72})·20H_{2}O
  - Erionite subgroup – (Na_{1−2},K_{1−2},Ca_{1−2})_{2}Al_{4}Si_{14}O_{36}·15H_{2}O
  - Faujasite subgroup – (Na_{1−2},Ca_{1−2},Mg_{1−2})_{3.5}[Al_{7}Si_{17}O_{48}]·32H_{2}O
  - Ferrierite subgroup – [Mg_{2}(K,Na)_{2}Ca_{0.5}](Si_{29}Al_{7})O_{72}·18H_{2}O (Ferrierite-Mg)
  - Heulandite subgroup – (Na,Ca,K)_{5−6}[Al_{8−9}Si_{27−28}O_{72}]·nH_{2}O
  - Laumontite – CaAl_{2}Si_{4}O_{12}·4H_{2}O
  - Mordenite – (Na_{2},Ca,K_{2})_{4}(Al_{8}Si_{40})O_{96}·28H_{2}O
  - Natrolite subgroup
    - Mesolite – Na_{2}Ca_{2}Si_{9}Al_{6}O_{30}·8H_{2}O
    - Natrolite – Na_{2}Al_{2}Si_{3}O_{10}·2H_{2}O
    - Scolecite – CaAl_{2}Si_{3}O_{10}·3H_{2}O
  - Paulingite subgroup – (K_{2},Ca,Na_{2},Ba)_{5}[Al_{10}Si_{35}O_{90}]·45H_{2}O (Paulingite-K)
  - Phillipsite subgroup
    - Phillipsite – (Ca_{3}(Si_{10}Al_{6})O_{32}·12H_{2}O (Phillipsite-Ca)
  - Pollucite – (Cs,Na)_{2}(Al_{2}Si_{4}O_{12})·2H_{2}O
  - Stilbite subgroup
    - Stellerite – Ca_{4}(Si_{28}Al_{8})O_{72}·28H_{2}O
    - Stilbite – (NaCa_{4},Na_{9})(Si_{27}Al_{9})O_{72}·28H_{2}O
  - Thomsonite subgroup – NaCa_{2}Al_{5}Si_{5}O_{20}·6H_{2}O (Thomsonite-Ca)
  - Yugawaralite – CaAl_{2}Si_{6}O_{16}·4H_{2}O

== See also ==
- Classification of non-silicate minerals – List of IMA recognized minerals and groupings
- Classification of silicate minerals – List of IMA recognized minerals and groupings
- Silicate mineral paint – Paint coats with mineral binding agents
