= Milarite =

Beryllium mineral

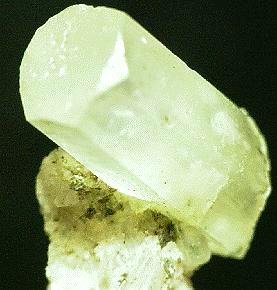

General
- Category: Minerals
- IMA symbol: Mil
- Crystal system: Hexagonal

Identification
- Mohs scale hardness: 6

Milarite is a rare beryl. It is a member of the osumilite group. Crystals of this mineral typically come in green or yellow. The mineral gets name after Val Milar.

== Occurrence ==
The mineral can be found be found in countries like Switzerland, Brazil, Mexico, China, Namibia, and the United States.

It can be found in Alpine fissures. The mineral also occurs in marble xenoliths.
