= Zinnwaldite =

Phyllosilicate mineral series in the trioctahedral mica group

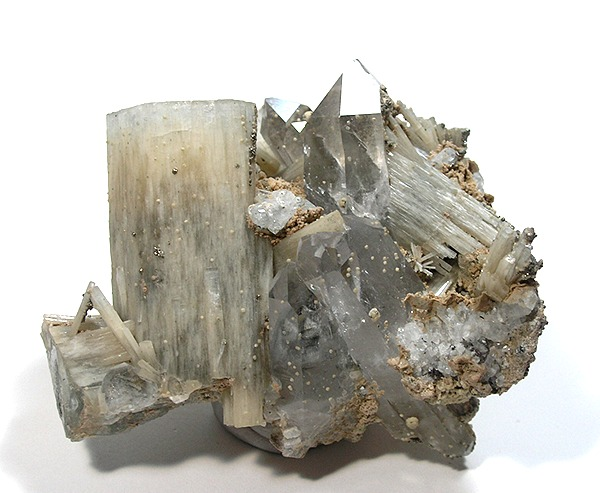
- Fluorapatite with topaz on zinnwaldite and quartz

General
- Category: Phyllosilicate minerals
- Group: Mica group, trioctahedral mica group
- Formula: KLiFeAl(AlSi_{3})O_{10}(OH,F)_{2}
- IMA symbol: Znw
- Crystal system: Monoclinic
- Crystal class: Prismatic (2/m) (same H-M symbol)
- Space group: Cc (no. 9)
- Unit cell: a = 5.29, b = 9.14 c = 10.09 [Å]; β = 100.83°

Identification
- Color: Gray-brown, yellow-brown, pale violet, dark green, color zoning common
- Crystal habit: Well-formed short prismatic or tabular crystals, pseudohexagonal, in rosettes or fan-shaped groups; lamellar or scaly aggregates; disseminated.
- Twinning: On composition plane {001}, twin axis [310]
- Cleavage: Perfect basal {001}
- Fracture: Uneven
- Tenacity: Laminae °exible, elastic
- Mohs scale hardness: 3.5 - 4.0
- Luster: Pearly to vitreous
- Streak: White
- Diaphaneity: Transparent to translucent
- Specific gravity: 2.9 - 3.1
- Optical properties: Biaxial (-)
- Refractive index: nα = 1.565 - 1.625 nβ = 1.605 - 1.675 nγ = 1.605 - 1.675
- Birefringence: 0.040 - 0.050
- Pleochroism: Distinct, X = colorless to yellow-brown; Y = gray-brown; Z = colorless to gray-brown
- 2V angle: 0 - 40°

Zinnwaldite, KLiFeAl(AlSi_{3})O_{10}(OH,F)_{2}, potassium lithium iron aluminium silicate hydroxide fluoride, is a silicate mineral in the mica group. The IMA status is as a series between siderophyllite (KFe_{2}Al(Al_{2}Si_{2})O_{10}(F,OH)_{2}) and polylithionite (KLi_{2}AlSi_{4}O_{10}(F,OH)_{2}) and not considered a valid mineral species.

== Name and discovery ==
It was first described in 1845 in Zinnwald/Cinvald (today Cínovec) on the German-Czech Republic border.

== Occurrence ==
It occurs in greisens, pegmatite, and quartz veins often associated with tin ore deposits. It is commonly associated with topaz, cassiterite, wolframite, lepidolite, spodumene, beryl, tourmaline, and fluorite.
