= Mining in Greenland =

Economic sector

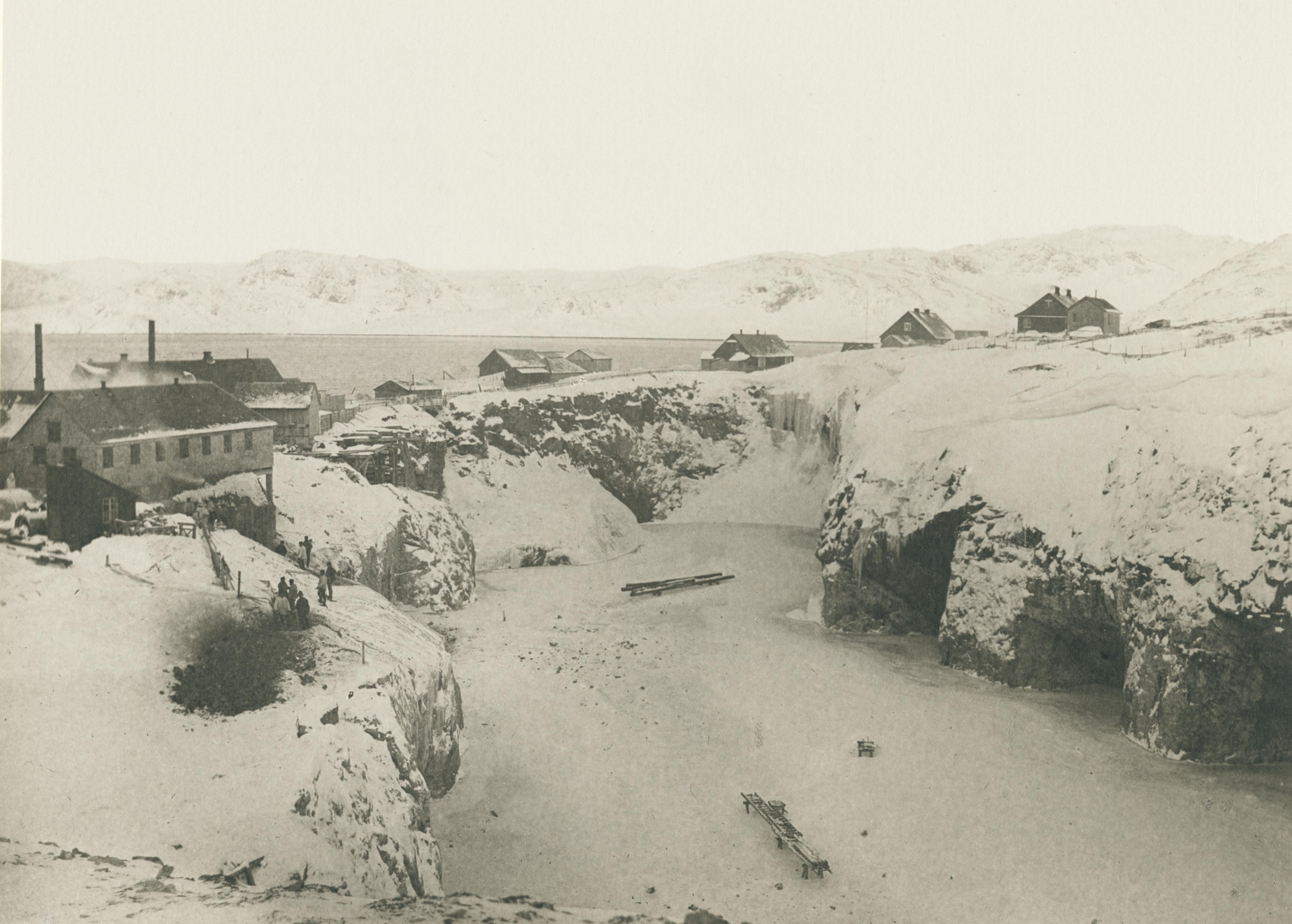
Ivittuut cryolite quarry, photographed sometime between 1889 and 1910

Mining has had a small impact on the economy of Greenland. Since 2010, governance over the sector has been under the authority of the Naalakkersuisut (Government of Greenland), following self-rule in 2009. Greenland's deposits of critical minerals, such as rare-earth elements used in electric vehicles and wind turbines, as well as nickel and cobalt for battery production, have drawn attention from governments in the United States and Europe, which are seeking to reduce dependence on China and ensure stable supplies for technological and defense needs.

Greenland contains deposits of coal, diamonds, and a range of metals, including silver, nickel, platinum, copper, molybdenum, iron, niobium, tantalum, uranium, and rare-earth elements. However, as of 2011, these deposits were not commercially viable, although Greenland's Bureau of Minerals and Petroleum continued efforts to promote the territory as a destination for mineral exploration.

== History ==
Greenland was once part of a larger landmass that included areas of present-day northern Europe and North America. About 500 million years ago, it formed part of a supercontinent situated between Europe and North America. Between roughly 60 and 65 million years ago, this landmass began to rift, a process that led to the opening of the North Atlantic Ocean. As the separation progressed, Greenland moved westward and passed over the Iceland hotspot, where rising magma contributed to the volcanic activity that later formed Iceland. The island now contains geological formations ranging from Precambrian basement rocks to glacial sediments.

European whalers are believed to have been among the first to obtain coal from outcrops on Disko Island, using it as fuel for blubber processing, while in Greenland it was primarily used for domestic heating. In 1777, the Royal Greenland Trading Department sent a German mining specialist to the Umanak colony to assess the feasibility of coal extraction for local use. Small-scale coal extraction on Disko Island followed in 1782, marking the earliest recorded mining activity in Greenland. In 1924, Denmark established a coal mine at Qullissat on Disko Island, which became a major operation staffed largely by Greenlandic workers. The mine was modernized in 1929 and continued operating until its closure in 1972 due to economic factors, after which the settlement was abandoned.

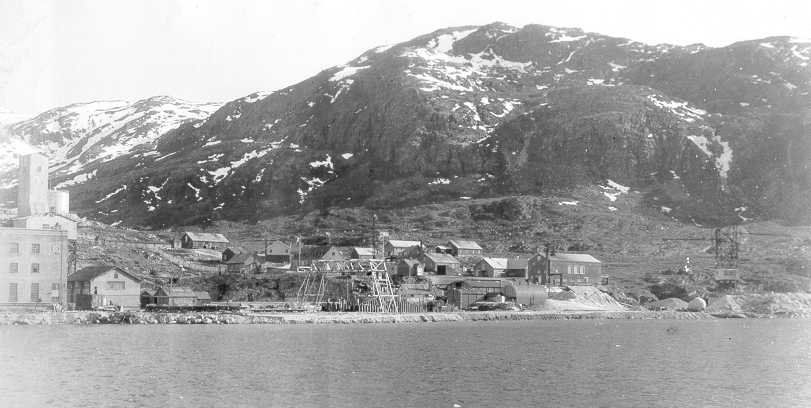
Ivittuut in the summer, 1940

In 1799, cryolite was discovered in Ivittuut, and nearby silver-bearing lead veins were briefly mined by British engineer J.W. Tayler before the low silver content made the operation unprofitable. Danish engineers began extracting cryolite in 1859, and in 1864, the Danish Kriolit Mine og Handels Selskabet received a monopoly on its production. Early mining operations processed cryolite for its aluminum content and supplied the Pennsylvania Salt Manufacturing Company, which used it to produce caustic soda. The 1884 development of the Hall–Héroult process, which relies on cryolite to extract aluminum from bauxite, increased the mineral's value. During World War II, the Ivittuut mines influenced the American occupation of Greenland, and the United States Navy established the Kangilinnguit naval base, also known as Bluie West Seven, to protect the cryolite quarry. After the war, the Danish company Kryolitselskabet Øresund continued mining cryolite, and revenues from the operation contributed to the founding of Grønlandsfly, now known as Air Greenland. The deposit eventually became uneconomical as synthetic cryolite became widely available. Mining activities ended in the early 1960s, although existing stockpiles continued to be exported. The Ivittuut mine was permanently closed in 1987, ending cryolite shipments from the site.

The first scientific descriptions of rare-earth elements in Greenland were published in 1806 by K. L. Giesecke, who identified arfvedsonite, eudialyte, and sodalite at the Ilimaussaq intrusive complex. Systematic geological surveys from the 1950s included airborne gamma-ray and ground scintillometric investigations, which identified uranium and rare-earth element potential at sites such as Kvanefjeld, with radiometric anomalies detected around 1956 and follow-up drilling carried out in the 1960s and 1970s. International exploration for rare-earth elements grew in the 2000s, particularly after 2007, when exploration licenses were issued for alkaline complexes including Ilimaussaq. By 2015, numerous licenses targeting rare-earth elements covered large areas of southern Greenland.

Comprehensive geological mapping began after the war, and two decades of coastal surveys showed how extensive the work would be. Estimates indicated that the ice-free regions would require approximately 200 map sheets at a 1:100,000 scale, and at the existing pace, the work would take about two centuries. The project shifted to a broader-scale approach, and initial maps of Greenland were completed in the early 2000s.

Kvanefjeld was first recognized in the 1950s, when its uranium potential attracted international interest during the Cold War. Niels Bohr visited nearby Narsaq in 1957 to support early investigations. Exploration ended in 1983 after Denmark decided to discontinue nuclear power. Greenland Minerals and Energy, later renamed Energy Transition Minerals, acquired the area in 2007.

In 1966, Dr. Martin Ghisler of the Geological Survey of Denmark and Greenland identified gem-quality ruby in an exposed rock formation on what later became known as Ruby Island. Exploration efforts relied on local knowledge from residents of the nearby village of Qeqertarsuatsiaat, formerly known as Fiskenæsset. Ruby was identified in association with sapphirine, kornerupine, pargasite, and phlogopite, leading to the confirmation of six ruby deposits in the Fiskenæsset district. During the 1970s, several Canadian junior mining companies, including Platinomino, Fiscannex, and Valhalla, explored the area for chromite and platinum and attempted to commercialize the ruby occurrences, but these efforts were unsuccessful. In 1995, Peter Appel of the Geological Survey of Denmark and Greenland published a review examining six ruby deposits in the Fiskenæsset district and concluded that the area needed further exploration. Following these findings, independent geologists Bill Brereton and Bill Anderson consolidated land holdings in the Fiskenæsset area.

Interest in petroleum resources began in the early 1970s following seismic studies around Greenland. The 1973 oil crisis encouraged exploration in an area previously known primarily for its fisheries. In 1975, leases were granted to several major companies, including Mobil, Amoco, Chevron, and Total. Drilling in 1976 and 1977 produced five dry wells. A 1997 study by the Geological Survey of Denmark and Greenland concluded that these wells had been abandoned without a full assessment of their potential. A sixth well drilled in 2000 by Statoil was also dry.

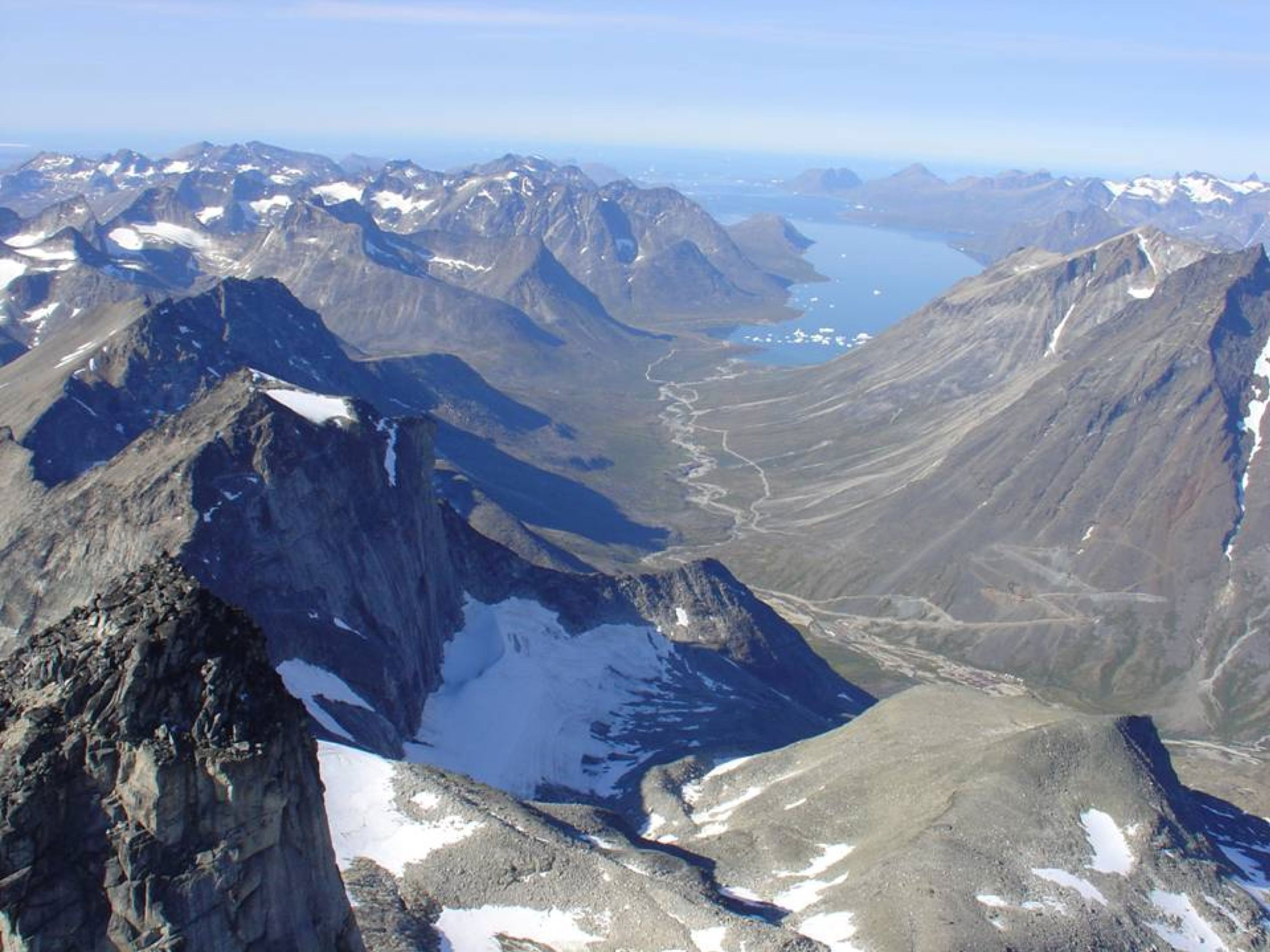
Nalunaq gold mine, 2014

Gold exploration in the area began in the late 1980s, when geologists from the exploration company Carl Nielsen identified gold flakes in coastal gravel at the foot of Kirkespiret mountain. Earlier geological mapping conducted in the 1960s by the Geological Survey of Greenland provided a basis for further work. In 1990, the Greenland exploration company Nunaoil received an exploration license, and its chief geologist believed the idea that the coastal gold originated from primary deposits in the surrounding mountains. In 1992, primary gold was identified nearly 500 m (1,600 ft) above sea level on the slopes of the Kirkespirdalen valley. The mineralization was visible in exposed quartz veins and appeared to extend for roughly 800 m (2,600 ft). Additional companies later joined the exploration efforts, carrying out the first drilling campaigns, and in 1998, an investigation adit was constructed, allowing the extraction of ore for pilot production and processing. Crew Gold Corporation, a British company, acquired a majority stake in the project in 1999, while Nunaminerals held 17.5 percent. The Nalunaq gold mine, located 33 km (21 mi) northeast of Nanortalik in the Ketilidian Orogenic Belt, was officially opened on 26 August 2004. In November 2007, Crew Gold Corporation acquired full ownership of the mine.

As of 2012, partly due to the retreat of the ice sheet linked to climate change, Greenland was identified as a region with significant untapped mineral resources. Research by GlobalData indicated that substantial mineral deposits were accessible using geological mapping technologies.

A major challenge is the island's limited infrastructure. The CEO of Nunaminerals, which declared bankruptcy in 2015 after 17 years of operation, stated that Greenland projects required the construction of roads, power plants, and other facilities, unlike similar deposits in more developed regions. As of 2025, Greenland had fewer than 100 miles of paved roads.

As of 2025, Lumina was extracting anorthosite, and KoBold, financed by Jeff Bezos, Bill Gates, and other investors, was exploring nickel deposits. Critical Metals Corporation operated a mine in southern Greenland, supported by Cantor Fitzgerald, whose chief executive before 2025 was Howard Lutnick.

== Location ==
Since World War II, Greenland has operated nine mines, of which only one, producing anorthosite, remains active. A gold mine is expected to reach full production later in the year.

Active mining areas include the Maamorilik site, which contains deposits of zinc, iron, lead, and silver, and Kvanefjeld, which contains deposits of rare-earth elements, uranium, and zinc.

Greenland is estimated to hold approximately 1.5 million tonnes of rare earth reserves, although no rare earth mine production was recorded in 2025. Michael Langford, EBC's Market Analyst has noted the disparity between Greenland's mineral potential and its current output.

Proposed mines in Greenland include:

- The Isua Iron Mine, located 150 km (93 mi) northeast of Nuuk, was planned to extract and export high-grade iron ore containing approximately 70 percent iron from the edge of Greenland's ice cap.
- The Citronen mine, located in Citronen Fjord, is planned to produce lead, zinc, and germanium. The site contains an estimated 100 million tonnes of ore with grades of 2 percent lead and 3 percent zinc.
- The Motzfeldt mine in Kujalleq is intended for niobium and tantalum extraction. It is one of Greenland's largest niobium reserves, with estimated deposits of 130 million tonnes of ore grading 1 percent niobium and 0.04 percent tantalum.
- The Qaqqaarsuk deposit in Qeqqata is planned for niobium extraction. It contains an estimated 3.5 million tonnes of ore with a niobium grade of 0.5 percent.

== Resources ==
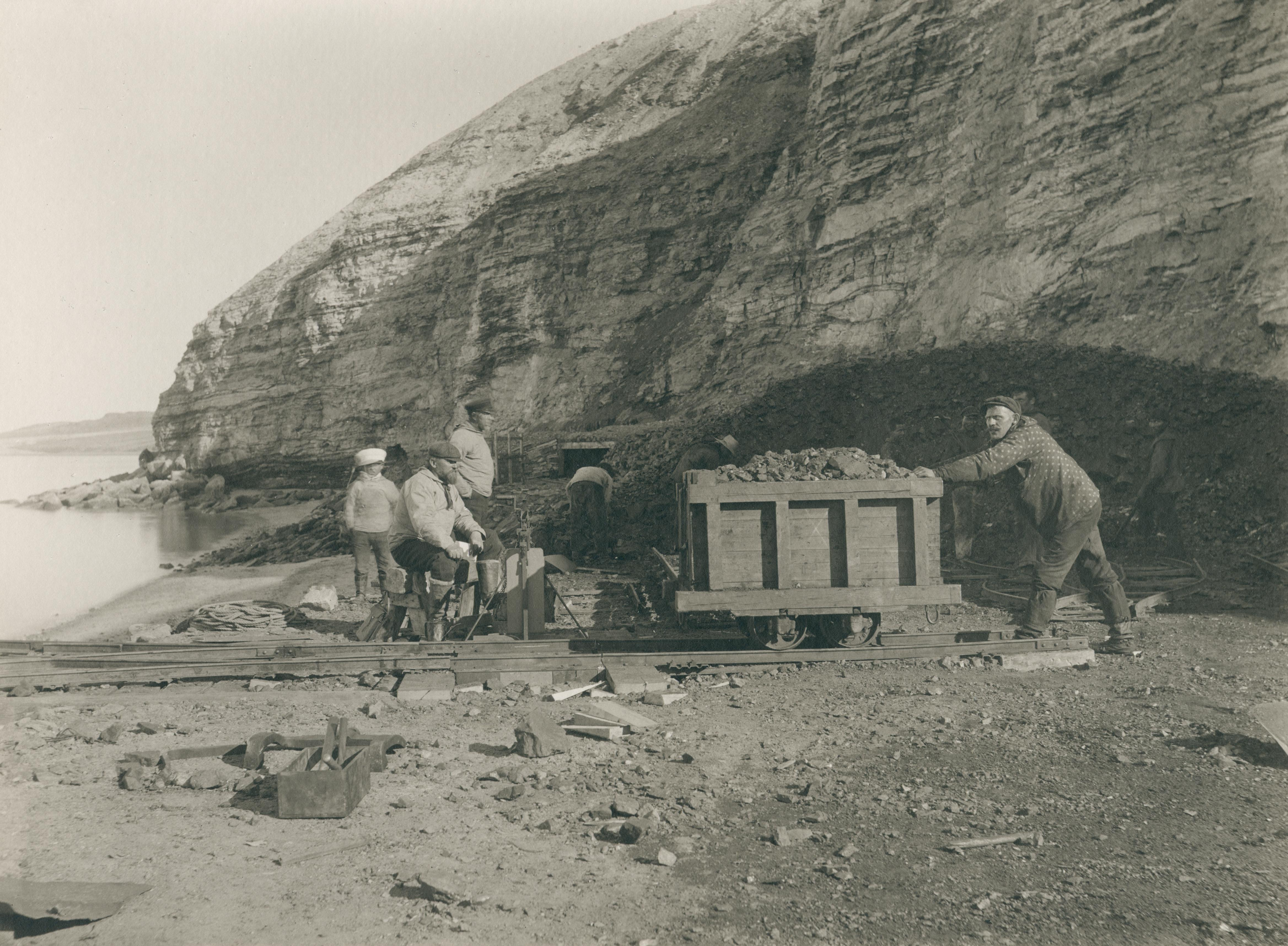
Qaarsuarsuk coal mine, photographed sometime between 1889 and 1909

- Coal — As of 2016, Greenland held an estimated 202 million short tons of proven coal reserves and had no coal imports or exports. This placed Greenland 52nd globally and represented approximately 0.018 percent of the world's total proven coal reserves, estimated at 1,139,471 million short tons. The proven reserves of Greenland exceeded its annual coal consumption, indicating that existing reserves could support consumption for a long amount of time.
- Gemstones
  - Diamonds have been recovered from kimberlite rocks in southern West Greenland, particularly in the Sisimiut–Sarfartoq–Maniitsoq area. At the Garnet Lake kimberlite dyke, a 14.6 kg drill core sample yielded 35 diamonds, with the largest weighing 0.122 carats. Testing of approximately 357 kg of kimberlite from the dyke produced nine commercial-sized diamonds larger than 0.85 mm, corresponding to an estimated grade of about 0.87 carats per tonne.
  - Rubies and pink sapphires occur in the Fiskenæsset region of western Greenland, including the localities of Aappaluttoq and Siggartartulik. Individual ruby crystals and fragments have been recovered, with some specimens measuring up to approximately 4 cm (1.6 in) and assessed as near gem quality. Bulk samples of about 3 tonnes have been collected from several sites for testing, although no large-scale production has been reported.
  - Kornerupine is found near Qeqertarsuatsiaat, where crystals up to 23 cm (9.1 in) in length have been documented. Some material has been cut into faceted gemstones weighing up to approximately 5.88 carats.

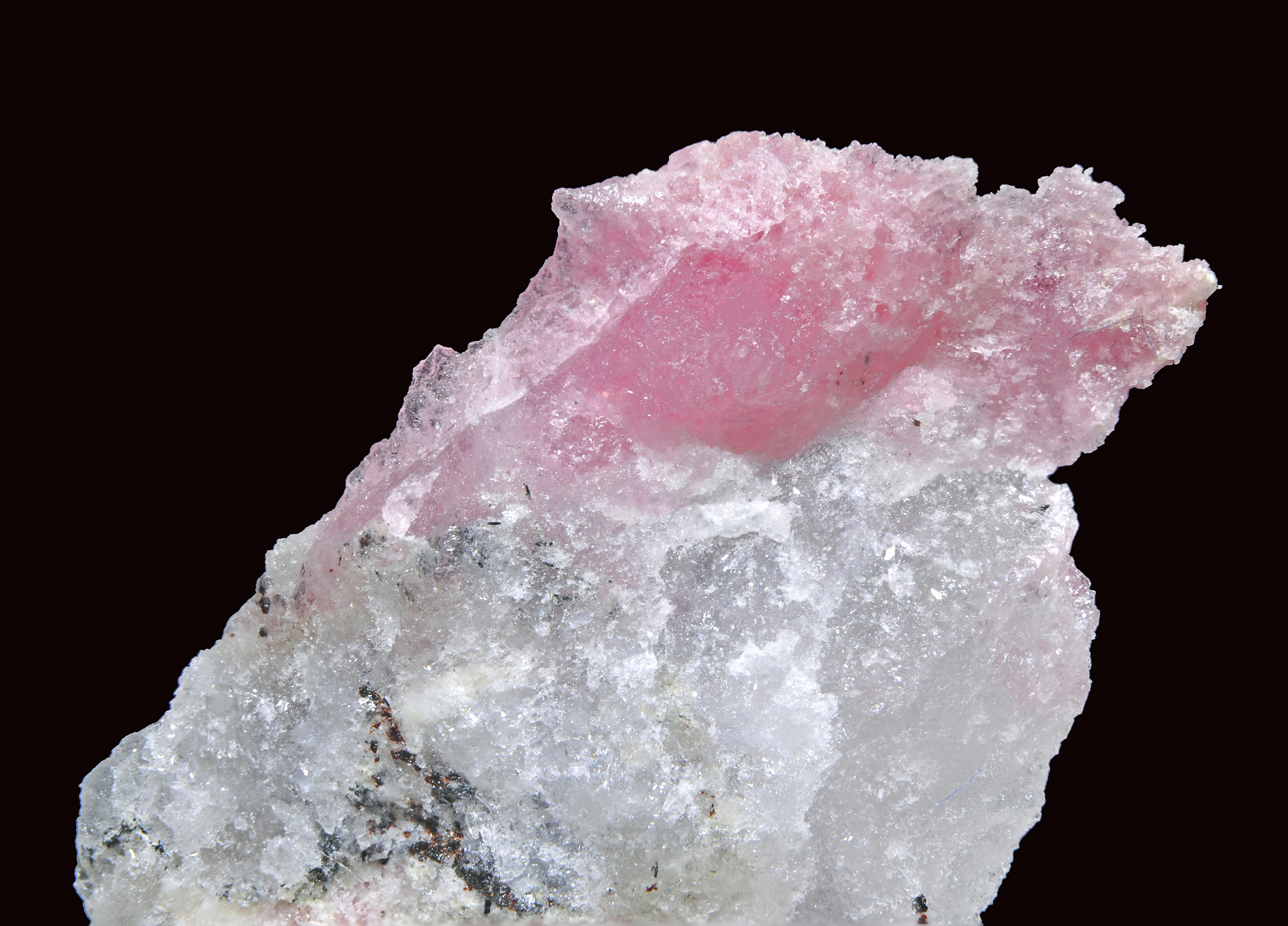
Tugtupite on quartz from the Ilimaussaq complex

  - Tugtupite occurs near Tunulliarfik Fjord in southern Greenland, in the Kvanefjeld area, typically within veins containing albite and associated minerals. Gem-quality tugtupite is mined on a small scale and sold locally.
  - Other gemstones reported from Greenland include beryl, cordierite, peridot, tourmaline, garnet, spinel, and topaz.
- Silver — Between December 1986 and 1990, annual production of silver averaged 13,000 metric tons based on five observations. Production declined from approximately 15,000 metric tons in December 1989 to about 9,000 metric tons in December 1990.
- Nickel
  - In the Fiskenæsset norite belt in western Greenland, norites and amphibolites associated with sulfide-enriched zones contain elevated nickel concentrations of up to approximately 2 percent.
  - In the Fiskefjord mafic–ultramafic intrusions, whole-rock samples have returned nickel values of up to 2.8 percent.
  - In the Vestfjord area of eastern Greenland, within Archean gneiss, disseminated pyrrhotite contains between 0.3 and 2.0 percent nickel.
  - In Liverpool Land, semi-massive sulfide lenses contain between 0.3 and 0.7 percent nickel.
  - In the Nassuttooq area of western Greenland, ultramafic rocks show nickel values of approximately 0.2 to 0.3 percent based on geochemical mapping and surface showings.
  - Drill core from Kakilisattooq in western Greenland has reported nickel values of up to approximately 0.67 percent within amphibolitic sequences.
  - Within the Tasiilaq–Ammassalik igneous complex in eastern Greenland, average grades of approximately 1.45 percent nickel and 0.5 percent copper have been reported. Resource estimates for this area indicate a minimum of 15 to 30 million tonnes of mineralized material.
- Molybdenum — Most of Greenland's molybdenum deposits are concentrated at the Malmbjerg project, which has proven and probable reserves of 245 million tonnes of ore grading 0.176 percent MoS_{2}, containing approximately 571 million pounds of molybdenum metal.
- Iron
  - The Isua Iron Mine is planned to extract and export high-grade iron ore. It has an estimated total iron ore resource of approximately 2 billion tonnes, with an average grade of about 32.9 percent iron hosted in hematite–quartz banded iron formation. Inferred resource estimates include approximately 955 million tonnes grading 34 percent iron and a comparable estimate of about 951 million tonnes grading 36.48 percent iron.
  - The Itilliarsuk banded iron formation deposit in central West Greenland comprises a sequence of iron-rich beds of reported thickness. Earlier exploration estimated resources of approximately 150 to 200 million tonnes of ore grading about 20 percent iron.
  - In northwest Greenland, within the Qaanaaq and Lauge Koch Kyst region, magnetite-rich banded iron formations typically contain iron concentrations of approximately 30 to 35 percent where exposed.
  - At the Minturn anomaly near Qaanaaq, magnetite float samples interpreted as iron ore have reported average iron contents of approximately 62.4 percent.
  - The Grønnedal-Ika alkaline complex in southern West Greenland contains carbonatite-hosted iron mineralization. While iron grades and tonnage have not been fully quantified, the mineralization has been described as significant.
- Niobium — The Motzfeldt mine contains one of Greenland's largest niobium reserves, with an estimated 130 million tonnes of ore grading 1 percent niobium. The Qaqqaarsuk deposit has estimated reserves of 3.5 million tonnes of ore grading 0.5 percent niobium.
- Tantalum — The Motzfeldt mine has an estimated 130 million tonnes of ore grading 0.04 percent tantalum.
- Uranium — JORC-compliant estimates for Kvanefjeld, including the Sørensen and Zone 3 orebodies, indicate uranium resources grading approximately 266 ppm U_{3}O_{8}. The 2015 JORC ore reserve was graded at 362 ppm U_{3}O_{8}, comprising 43 million tonnes proved and 64 million tonnes probable.
- Rare-earth elements — Greenland contains rare-earth element resources that remain largely undeveloped. Estimates of potential reserves range from approximately 1.5 million metric tons, according to the U.S. Geological Survey, to as much as 42 million tonnes of rare-earth oxides, according to the Geological Survey of Denmark and Greenland, which could give Greenland the world's second-largest reserves of rare-earth elements, ahead of Vietnam, Brazil, and Russia.

== Politics ==
The politics of mining in Greenland are influenced by international interest, the island's self-rule, and domestic debates over the management and development of its natural resources. In 1867, U.S. Secretary of State William H. Seward considered annexing Greenland and Iceland, citing their resources and strategic potential, although no formal offer was made. In 1921, Denmark formally asserted sovereignty over the entire island. By 1939, Greenland's mineral deposits, including cryolite, contributed to U.S. strategic planning, particularly as German operations during the North Atlantic weather war showed the island's economic importance. During the 1970s, U.S. Vice President Nelson Rockefeller proposed the idea of acquiring Greenland for its mining potential. The proposal became public in 1982, when Rockefeller's former speechwriter, Joseph E. Persico, described it in his book The Imperial Rockefeller.

Interest in Greenland's resources continued into the 21st century. In 2017, Donald Trump reportedly considered the possibility of annexing Greenland, partly because of its rare-earth elements and economic potential. The proposal was rejected by Greenlandic and Danish authorities. Under the Biden administration, Western investment in Greenland's mining sector was encouraged, with U.S. firms prioritized over Chinese companies for the island's largest rare-earth deposit. Following the 2024 U.S. presidential election, discussions regarding American business involvement and resource development continued, although Greenlandic and Danish leaders reiterated that the island was not for sale.

China has also expressed interest in Greenland's mineral resources and its location near potential Arctic shipping routes, though its presence on the island has declined in recent years. In 2018, China published an Arctic policy white paper outlining plans for a "Polar Silk Road" linked to the Belt and Road Initiative. During the 2010s, Greenland encouraged investment from Chinese mining companies, but several projects involving Chinese partners were later delayed, suspended, or abandoned. Proposed Chinese involvement in infrastructure projects, including airport construction and the redevelopment of a former Danish naval base as a research facility, did not proceed, in part due to opposition from the United States. While Greenland has stated that it remains open to cooperation with international partners, China has not renewed significant engagement on the island. China's primary Arctic activities are concentrated in Russia. Although China is Greenland's largest trading partner, this reflects China's global trade position rather than a distinct feature of Greenland's external relations.

Following a referendum, Greenlandic home rule came into effect on 1 May 1979, granting Greenland authority over areas including education, health, fisheries, and the environment. In 2010, governance over mining was transferred to the authority of the Naalakkersuisut (Government of Greenland), following self-rule in 2009.

In 1988, a zero-tolerance policy was introduced that prohibited uranium extraction and the mining of minerals containing uranium as a by-product. This ban was overturned in 2013, when the Inatsisartut permitted the extraction of uranium, thorium, rare-earth elements, and other minerals in Greenland. In 2021, Greenland enacted Act No. 20, prohibiting the preliminary investigation, exploration, and exploitation of uranium above 100 ppm. The law was adopted by the Inatsisartut on 9 November 2021, following a public consultation that generated more than 60 stakeholder submissions, and entered into force the day after promulgation. At the time of adoption, no active uranium mining projects were in operation, although uranium occurs in association with other mineral deposits. The legislation formed part of the government's broader climate policy agenda. On 25 October 2021, Greenland acceded to the Paris Agreement by lifting its territorial reservation, without committing to specific emissions reduction targets. On 11 November 2021, Greenland joined the Beyond Oil and Gas Alliance and pledged not to issue additional oil exploration licenses.

In the 2013 Greenlandic general election, exploitation of mineral resources was the main campaign issue. The governing Inuit Ataqatigiit party supported permitting foreign labor, largely from China, to work in the mining sector, while the Siumut party opposed the proposal. Rare-earth elements were a major focus of the debate.

In November 2020, Prime Minister Kim Kielsen lost the leadership election of the Siumut party to Erik Jensen but remained in office as prime minister. Subsequent rivalry between Kielsen and Jensen, along with disagreements over the proposed Kvanefjeld mine, led the Democrats to withdraw from the coalition government. This left Siumut and Nunatta Qitornai with 12 of the 31 seats in the Inatsisartut. Kielsen was unable to form a new governing coalition, and the Inatsisartut voted to hold the 2021 Greenlandic general election. Rare-earth mining became a central issue in the election campaign, particularly the proposed development of the Kvanefjeld deposit in southern Greenland. The deposit was the subject of public hearings and party debate. Rare-earth elements are used in the production of components for technologies such as wind turbines and electric vehicles. Mining proposals raised environmental concerns, while rising demand for electric vehicles contributed to increased interest in these resources. Uranium is also present in the deposit, and its extraction faced public opposition. Greenland Minerals Limited, an Australian-based company with Chinese ownership, had pursued development of the Kvanefjeld project since 2007. The opposition party Inuit Ataqatigiit called for a moratorium on uranium mining, which also affected the broader rare-earth project. The governing Siumut party supported the project, citing potential economic benefits. A public opinion survey on mining at Kvanefjeld reported that 63 percent of respondents opposed development, including 45 percent who were strongly opposed. Other political issues, including independence, COVID-19 policies, foreign relations, and democratic institutions, received less attention than the mining debate during the election.

== See also ==
- Arctic resources race
- Gemstone industry in Greenland
- Mining in Denmark
