= Gemstone industry in Greenland =

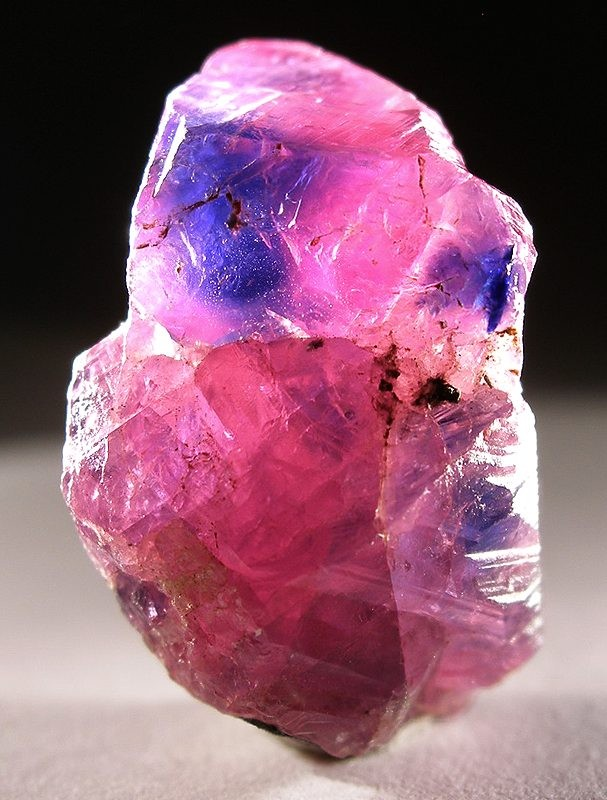
Example of a raw pink sapphire, the mineral corundum

Gemstones have been found in Greenland, including diamond, ruby, sapphire, kornerupine, tugtupite, lapis lazuli, amazonite, peridot, quartz, spinel, topaz, and tourmaline. Most of Greenland's ruby and sapphire occurrences are located near the village of Fiskenaesset/Qeqertarsuatsiaat on the southwest coast.

A total of 31 ruby and sapphire occurrences have been confirmed in the Fiskenaesset/Qeqertarsuatsiaat district. One of these occurrences, Aappaluttoq (63.029°N 50.298°W), is being developed for a potential mining operation.

When European scientists first arrived in Greenland over 200 years ago to study the geology, they encountered native Kalaallit (Greenlandic Inuit) who were already familiar with the red gemstone ruby.

The native inhabitants continued to assist the European explorers with their ruby exploration, leading them to some half dozen locations, spread out for over a hundred miles along the southwest shores of Greenland, known as the Kitaa Coast.

== Gemology ==
Ruby and pink sapphire are the red and pink varieties of the mineral corundum, an aluminum-oxide mineral Al_{2}O_{3}. The pink/red colour is formed in corundum by adding the element chromium to its crystal structure. Spectroscopy of rubies from the Aappaluttoq occurrence in Greenland confirm the presence of chromium as well as showing absorption in the UV region indicating high Fe (iron) content.

Characteristics reported in Thirangoon, 2009, include:

- most of the crystals examined contained bohmite or kaolinite crystals. The presence of these minerals indicates the samples were not heat treated.
- laser ablation studies confirm the presence of trace elements Ti, V, Cr, Fe, and Ga, which are similar to rubies from other sources. Aappaluttoq samples contained high Fe, low V, and low Ga content. Chromium content varied widely depending on the colour of the samples, ranging from light pink to dark red.
- population-field plotting of trace elements shows a good separation of Aappaluttoq rubies from many other sources.
- inclusions (identified by Raman spectrometry) noted in the sample suite examined include: bohmite, catapleiite, chlorite, cordierite, corundum, cosalite, dolomite, feldspar, magnesite, margarite, mica, pargasite, pyroxene, rutile, sapphirine, and sillimanite. Other inclusions observed included iridescent fine needle-like inclusions (possibly rutile), clouds of reflective thin films, and iridescent platelets. Many samples showed lamellar twinning.

== Geology ==
The ruby deposits of Fiskenæsset are Archaen aged and are contact metasomatic replacements in micaceous anorthosites. Corundum forms locally in both regional and contact metamorphic environments, as well as in hydrothermal settings. Ruby-bearing metasomatic zones typically formed along the amphibolite hangingwall contact of the chromite bearing and cumulate-layered Fiskenæsset anorthosite complex in close proximity to altered ultramafic rocks. Individually, ruby-bearing zones can measure up to 20 metres in thickness and up to 200 metres in length. They may occur as single showings, but are usually found in alignments of multiple showings, with some of the occurrences such as The Ruby Island Line collectively up to 3.5 kilometres in strike length, and as much as 100 metres in width.

== History ==
In 1966, gem-quality ruby was discovered in outcrop on what became known as Ruby Island by Dr. Martin Ghisler, with the Geological Survey of Denmark and Greenland (GEUS). Ghisler's scouts and support staff drew heavily from the knowledge of the native population of the nearby village of Qeqertarsuatsiaat (formerly Fiskenaesset). The exploration team discovered ruby in association with the minerals sapphirine, kornerupine, pargasite, and phlogopite, confirming six ruby deposits in the Fiskenaesset district.

During the 1970s, junior Canadian mining companies, among them Platinomino, Fiscannex, and Valhalla, explored the region for chromite and platinum and attempted, unsuccessfully, to commercialize the ruby occurrences near Fiskenaesset.

Peter Appel (1995) with the Geological Survey of Denmark and Greenland, published a review of the six ruby deposits then known in the Fiskenaesset district and recognized sufficient potential to encourage further exploration. Based on his recommendations, two independent geologists named Bill Brereton and Bill Anderson consolidated the land holdings at Fiskenaesset.

== Exploration ==
In 2004, True North Gems Inc., a public Canadian junior exploration company established to search for colored gemstones at high northern latitudes, acquired the Fiskenaesset property from Brereton and Anderson and identified the Greenland Ruby as an important coloured gemstone occurrence. The company was motivated by the success of their competitors in the Canadian diamond fields beginning in 1991.

True North Gems hired local residents from Qeqertarsuatsiaat and Nuuk, the capital of Greenland, to help explore the district and, over the course of the next three years, increased the number of ruby occurrences known from six to twenty nine. They bulk sampled the main deposits. True North Gems paid for Canadian gem and jewelry experts to come to the community and train the locals in order to assist them in developing a cottage industry making ruby jewelry and mounting collector specimens.

In four years between 2004 and 2008, True North has collected a total of thirteen mini-bulk samples; from seven ruby showings: Siggartartulik; Lower Annertusoq; Upper Annertusoq; Kigutilik; Ruby Island; Qaqqatsiaq; and, Aappaluttoq. In 2004 and 2005, True North collected three tonne samples from each of Siggartartulik, Lower Annertusoq, Upper Annertusoq, Kigutilik, Ruby Island, and Qaqqatsiaq. In 2006, True North collected 30 tonnes from Kigutilik and from Aappaluttoq. In 2007 True North collected three separate samples at Aappaluttoq totalling 82.8 tonnes. In 2008, an additional 125 tonnes of material was collected from Aappaluttoq by blasting and 30–40 tonnes of ruby bearing overburden was collected. To date True North Gems has not sold any ruby material as it is not permitted to do so until it has received a mining permit.

In 2007 and 2008 True North Gems drilled a ruby deposit in the Fiskenaesset district at a place called Aappaluttoq. A total of 6,974 metres of diamond drilling was completed in 65 holes. Ruby and pink sapphire was found in 48 of the holes. At Aappaluttoq, the ruby and pink sapphire mineralization occurs in a corundum (ruby-sapphire) alteration band that exhibits trench-to-trench and drill hole-to-drill hole continuity. This corundum band is contained within a broader phlogopite and pargasite-enriched alteration zone referred to as the Host Zone Alteration. The ruby mineralization at the Aappaluttoq prospect has been traced in drilling and surface exposures over a strike length of 135 metres and a vertical depth of 143 metres. The closely associated Aappaluttoq Deep Zone has now been traced in drilling over a strike length of 85 metres and continues to vertical depths of 70–143 metres below surface. Both zones remain open along strike and to depth.

On 17 May 2011 an initial resource calculation was announced for Aappaluttoq. The resource included indicated resources of 189,150 tonnes of material hosting 59 million grams (296 million carats) of corundum and inferred a further 21 million grams (109 million carats) of material was present at Aappaluttoq to a depth of 65m. The deposit remains open along strike and to depth. The resource is National Instrument 43–101 compliant and is the first coloured gemstone resource ever to be published under these laws.

True North Gems has initiated a socio-economic impact assessment in anticipation of a commercial ruby mining operation. Stakeholder meetings were held in Nuuk and Qeqertarsuatsiaat in February 2011. The company's proposals for the potential mining operation were well received at the meetings, and more discussions will be undertaken with respect to issues raised; particularly training, employment, and further encouragement of local gemstone and jewelry initiatives. The company's formal filing of a draft exploitation (mining) licence was submitted in June 2011 and was accepted in June 2013. Company and government public hearings were held in August 2013. In March 2014, the company was granted an exclusive 30-year exploitation (mining) license for Aappaluttoq.

The company was accused of discouraging the villagers from Qeqertarsuatsiaat and elsewhere in Greenland from coming into the area of their active exploration to remove rubies, even though it was argued that the Greenlanders had the right of mineral access under "Section 32" of the country's Mineral Resources Act administered by the Bureau of Minerals and Petroleum (www.bmp.gl). Section 32 was argued to confirm not only native people's right of access to the land to hunt and fish and prospect for minerals for their own purposes, but also to hand mine gem grade ruby material, even on the legal exploration licenses of other parties. Later legal interpretation established that the right of mineral access did not extend to the removal of gem grade material. This interpretation was contested on the grounds that, among other things, that Denmark as a signature to the UN Declaration on Indigenous Rights should allow such activity as a sustainable livelihoods opportunity.

The 16 August Union generated a paper and electronic email petition in support of their cause. They obtained over 3500 signatures from a country with only 57,000 people, about 4.5% of the population. Another 1000 people internationally signed over the internet.

In December, 2009, a new Mineral Resources Act was passed which, among other changes, created a legal system for small-scale exploration and mining of minerals. These provisions were specifically and exclusively designed to allow Greenlanders to obtain mining rights with a simplified system and reduced fees.

The 16 August Union contends that Greenlanders cannot afford the cost of the permits and that the new permit system is too complex and claim that BMP's actions show that the government favours foreign mining interests over Greenlanders. The number of permits issued under the new provisions is slowly increasing.

The 16 August Union is looking for the lawmakers to uphold their constitutional claim to traditional rights under section 32 of the mineral act and in doing so create the opportunity for responsible small scale mining to take place.

== See also ==
- Greenland
- Geology of Greenland
