= Geology of Greenland =

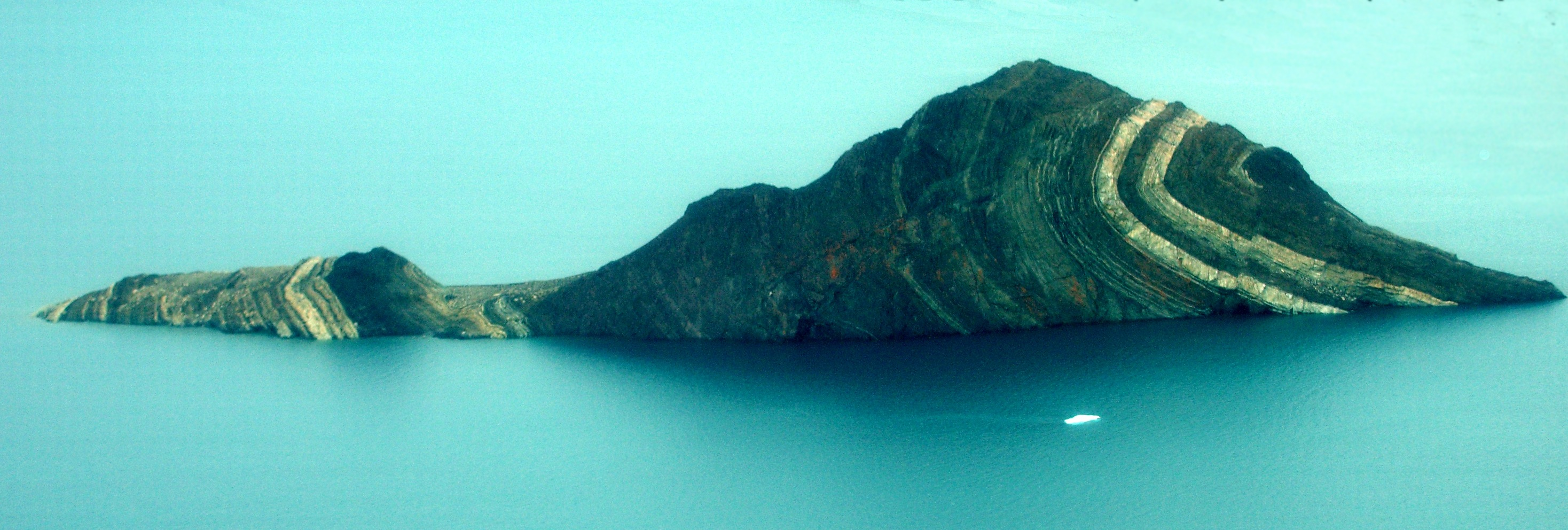
Fold on an island in King Oscar Fjord, thought to result from the Caledonian orogeny.

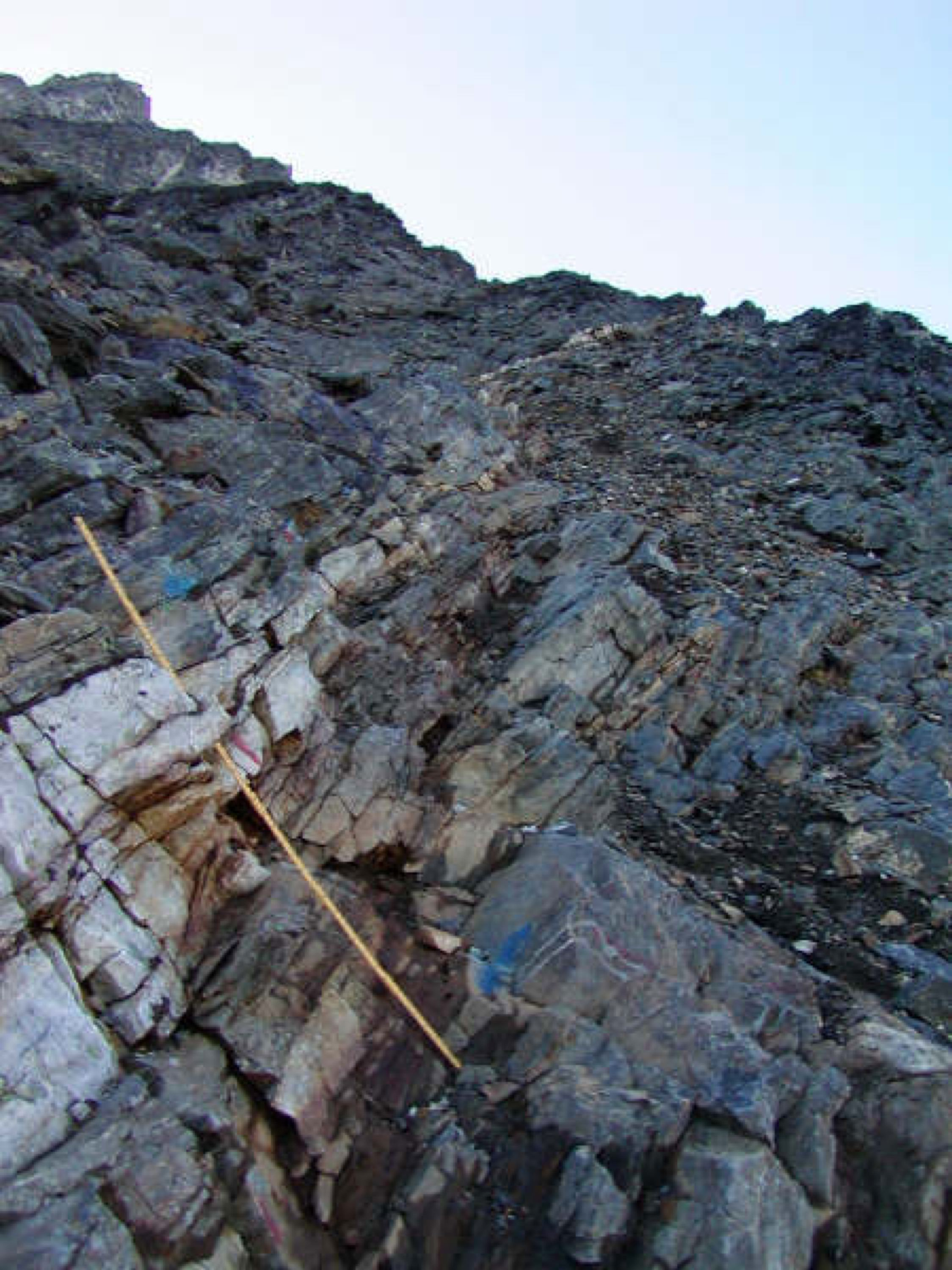
Main Vein (a quartz-gold vein), outcrop exposure at Nalunaq Gold Mine, southern Greenland

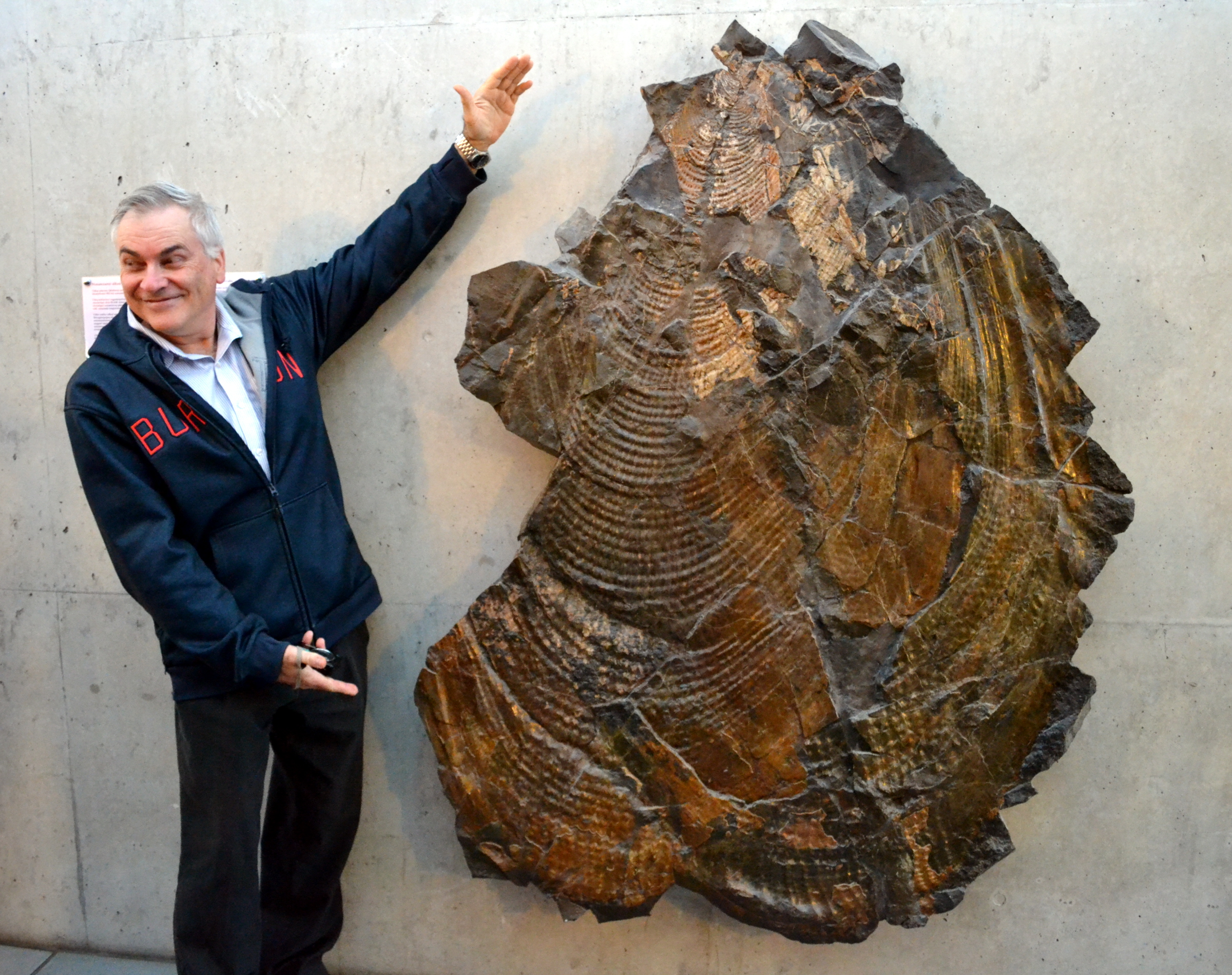
Inoceramus steenstrup, world's largest fossil mollusk, found on the Nuussuaq Peninsula in western Greenland

Greenland is the largest island on Earth. Only one-fifth of its surface area is exposed bedrock, the rest being covered by ice. The exposed surface is approximately 410,000 km^{2}.

The geology of Greenland is dominated by crystalline rocks of the Precambrian Shield. The crystalline rocks of the Nuuk/Qeqertarsuatsiaat area comprise some of the oldest bedrock in Greenland which covers most of western Greenland. The surface has been altered several times and has an appearance as though it were shaped billions of years ago. This is one of the reasons why the Nuuk area is extraordinary and also because the particular climate zone for the area limits the vegetation which makes it possible to observe impressive km-scale megascopic textures. The bedrock around Nuuk consists of two major lithologic packages, the dark melanocratic Amitsoq gneiss, which is intruded by and complexly folded into the younger leucocratic Nuuk gneiss. This western gneiss complex is approximately 3600 million years old.

The Isua Greenstone Belt in the Isukasia area, southwest Greenland, is extraordinary in that it contains some of the oldest bedrock on the planet, approximately 3800 million years old. The bedrock is not nearly as metamorphosed as the surrounding gneiss bedrock and is therefore of interest for answering how the Earth's surface appeared billions of years ago. There is a massive magnetite resource in this area.

There are large deposits of rare-earth oxides at Kvanefjeld.

Greenland's first gold mine is the Nalunaq mine, which opened in 2004. Nalunaq is located 33 km northeast of Nanortalik, in the Ketilidian Orogenic Belt of southern Greenland (60° 21′ 29″ N, 44° 50′ 11″ W). Gold-quartz mineralization occurs along a shallowly-dipping fault believed to be a thrust fault in which the hanging wall consists of Paleoproterozoic amphibolite-facies metavolcanic rocks, and the footwall consists of variably altered and mineralized volcanic rocks (i.e., volcanogenic massive sulfides). Quartz-gold mineralization has been dated to 1.77 to 1.80 billion years ago (late Paleoproterozoic), during the Ketilidian Orogeny.

The Skaergaard intrusion is a layered mafic intrusion in eastern Greenland formed 55 million years ago during the opening of the North Atlantic Ocean. Skaergaard is one of the world's foremost examples of a layered mafic intrusion which exhibits exceptionally well-developed cumulate layering.

A recent study reported that there is a hot mantle plume rising from the core–mantle boundary to the mantle transition zone beneath central Greenland.

== Fossils ==
A number of fossils were collected in Greenland, mostly on the east coast, from Paleozoic to Holocene, from which the Devonian Acanthostega and Ichthyostega are examples of international relevance. The Late Triassic of Jameson Land is particularly relevant due to the finding of early mammals, found in the expeditions of Farish Jenkins. The Fleming Fjord Formation yielded a number of theropod and sauropod tracks, temnospondyls, phytosaurs and stem turtles.

== See also ==
- Gemstone industry in Greenland
- Nagssugtoqidian orogeny
