= Prismatine =

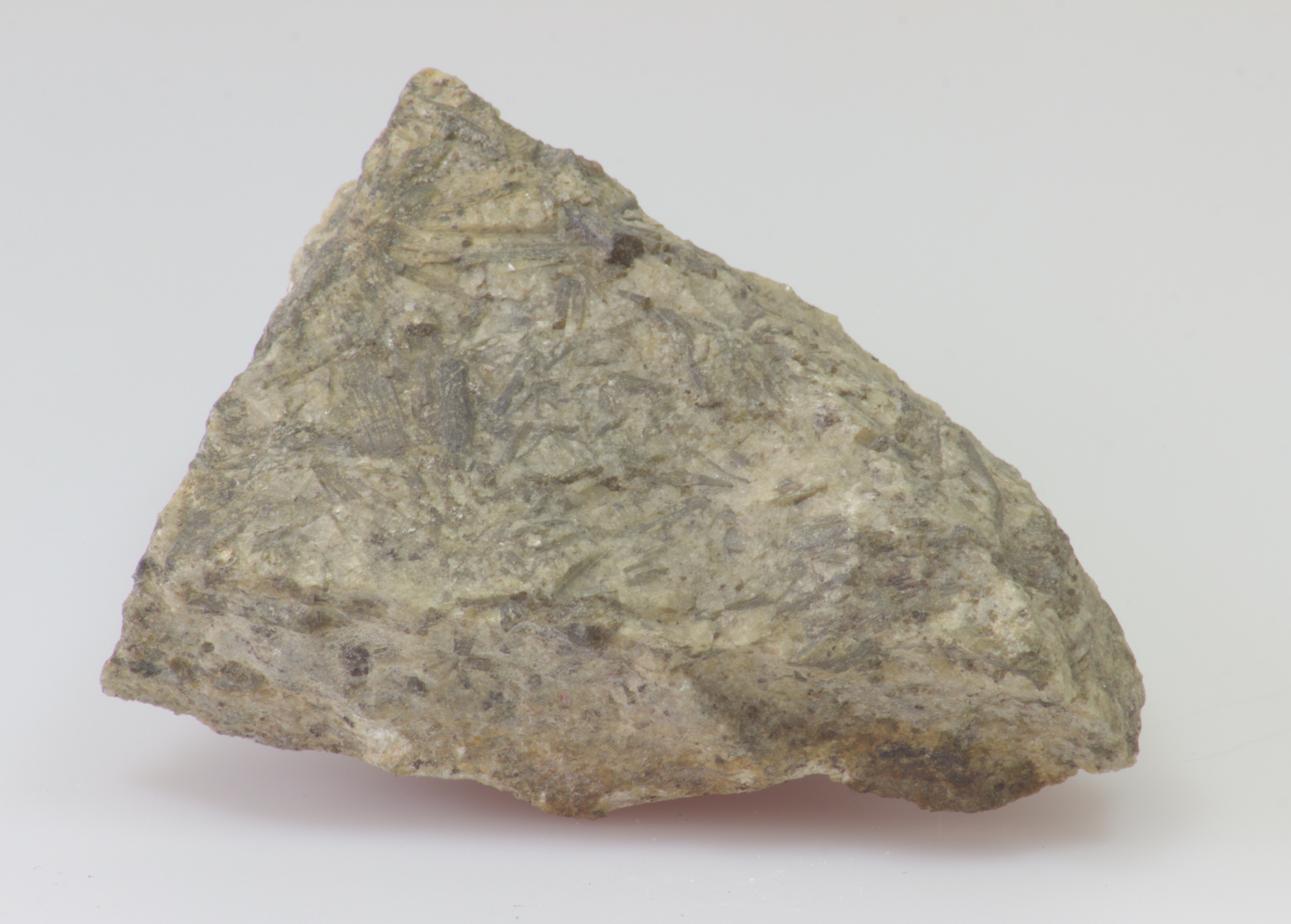

General
- Category: Sorosilicate
- Formula: ([ ],Fe,Mg)(Mg,Al,Fe)_{5}Al_{4}Si_{2}(Si,Al)_{2}(B,Si,Al)(O,OH,F)_{22}
- IMA symbol: Prm
- Strunz classification: 9.BJ.50
- Crystal system: Orthorhombic
- Crystal class: Dipyramidal (mmm); H-M symbol: (2/m 2/m 2/m)
- Space group: Cmcm

Identification
- Color: Yellow brown, green brown, brown green
- Specific gravity: 3.34
- Optical properties: Biaxial (-)

Prismatine is an orthorhombic-dipyramidal mineral containing aluminium, boron, fluorine, hydrogen, iron, magnesium, oxygen, and silicon. It forms a solid solution series with kornerupine.
