= Ferrohortonolite =

General
- Category: Minerals
- Formula: Fe/(Fe+Mg)

Ferrohortonolite is a mineral variety in the olivine series composed of 70% to 90% fayalite and 30% to 10% forsterite or Fe/(Fe+Mg) ratio of 0.7 to 0.9. It is from the obsolete hortonolite terminology for the olivine series.

It has been reported from Mount Gillies, Queensland, Australia; the Ilimaussaq complex of west Greenland; Pantelleria Island, Sicily; and from Choc village on Saint Lucia.
