= Shenghe Resources =

Chinese partly state-owned rare earths mining and processing company

Shenghe Resources Holding Co., Ltd.
- Native name: 盛和資源控股股份有限公司
- Type: Public; partly state-owned
- Traded as: SSE: 600392
- Industry: Mining
- Founded: 1998; 28 years ago
- Headquarters: Chengdu, China
- Key people: Hu Zesong, chairman
- Owner: Ministry of Natural Resources
- Website: www.shengheholding.com

Shenghe Resources (Chinese: 盛和资源) is a Chinese partly state-owned rare earths mining and processing company founded in 1998. The company is listed on the Shanghai Stock Exchange and its largest shareholder is the Ministry of Natural Resources. Shenghe Resources is affiliated with Aluminum Corporation of China, which maintains a seat on its board and is involved its strategic decision-making.

== History ==
Shenghe Resources, previously referred to as Taiyuan Technology Tiansheng Science and Technology Company Limited, was listed on the Shanghai Stock Exchange in May 2003. In December 2012, TaiGong Tiansheng finalized the major asset reorganization plan by divesting all assets and liabilities to Shanxi Coke Group Co., Ltd. and issuing shares to the shareholders of Leshan Shenghe Rare Earth Co., Ltd. to acquire 99.9999% of the equity of Leshan Shenghe Rare Earth Co. In 2013, Leshan Shenghe Rare Earth Co., Ltd. executed a reverse takeover and adopted its current name.

In 2016, Shenghe Resources purchased a 10 percent stake in Australian mining firm Energy Transition Minerals. In 2019, the company partnered with China National Nuclear Corporation to import and process uranium and thorium from the Kvanefjeld mine in Greenland. Shenghe Resources is a minority shareholder and the sole purchaser of MP Material's rare earth concentrate, mined from the Mountain Pass mine in California.

In 2022, Shenghe Resources purchased a 20 percent stake in Australian mining firm Peak Rare Earths. In 2024, the company acquired half of Peak Rare Earths' ownership in the Ngualla project in Tanzania.

In 2023, Shenghe Resources purchased a 9.9 percent stake in Australian mining company Vital Metals and also agreed to buy its entire stockpile of rare earth materials from its Nechalacho mine in Northwest Territories. In June 2024, the Canadian government blocked the sale of the stockpile on national security grounds.

In April 2025, Shenghe Resources stated that its U.S. affiliate, MP Materials, had stopped shipping minerals for processing due to the tariffs in the second Trump administration. In September 2026, Shenghe Resources was reported to be in talks to be acquired by state-owned China Rare Earth Group.

== Operations ==
- Leshan Processing Facility (China): The company's original refining base in Sichuan Province processes rare earth ores into oxides and metals. It includes facilities for solvent extraction and alloy manufacturing.
- Ngualla Rare Earth Project (Tanzania): Shenghe owns 50% of this high-grade bastnaesite deposit through its JV with Peak Rare Earths. It is planned to produce neodymium and praseodymium (NdPr) for magnet supply chains.

== See also ==
- Rare-earth industry in China
