= Sapphirine =

Rare mineral, a silicate of magnesium and aluminium

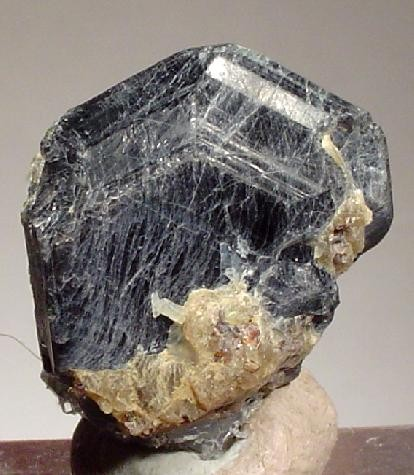
- Indigo-blue sapphirine crystal from Ft. Dauphin, Madagascar (size: 2.1 x 1.9 x 1.4 cm)

General
- Category: Silicate mineral
- Formula: (Mg,Al)_{8}(Al,Si)_{6}O_{20}
- IMA symbol: Spr
- Strunz classification: 9.DH.45
- Crystal system: 2M polytype: monoclinic 1A polytype: triclinic
- Crystal class: 2M polytype: prismatic (2/m); 1A polytype: pinacoidal (1̅)
- Space group: 1A polytype: P1̅; Other polytypes: 3A, 5A, 2M, 4M
- Unit cell: a = 11.27 Å, b = 14.4 Å c = 9.93 Å; β = 125.5°; Z = 4

Identification
- Colour: Light to dark blue or green, white, gray, pale red, yellow
- Crystal habit: Anhedral, granular, tabular
- Twinning: Uncommon on {001}
- Cleavage: Poor to indistinct on {100}, {001}, and {010}
- Fracture: Subconchoidal to uneven
- Mohs scale hardness: 7.5
- Lustre: Vitreous
- Streak: White
- Diaphaneity: Transparent to translucent
- Specific gravity: 3.40–3.58
- Optical properties: Biaxial (−)
- Refractive index: n_{α} = 1.701 – 1.729 n_{β} = 1.703 – 1.732 n_{γ} = 1.705 – 1.734
- Birefringence: δ = 0.004 – 0.005
- Pleochroism: X = colorless, pale reddish, yellowish green, pale yellow; Y = sky-blue, lavender-blue, bluish green; Z = blue, sapphire-blue, dark blue
- 2V angle: Measured: 47 to 114°

Sapphirine is a rare mineral, a silicate of magnesium and aluminium, with the chemical formula (Mg,Al)_{8}(Al,Si)_{6}O_{20} (with iron as a major impurity). Named for its sapphire-like colour, sapphirine is primarily of interest to researchers and collectors: well-formed crystals are treasured and occasionally cut into gemstones. Sapphirine has also been synthesized for experimental purposes via a hydrothermal process.

== Properties ==
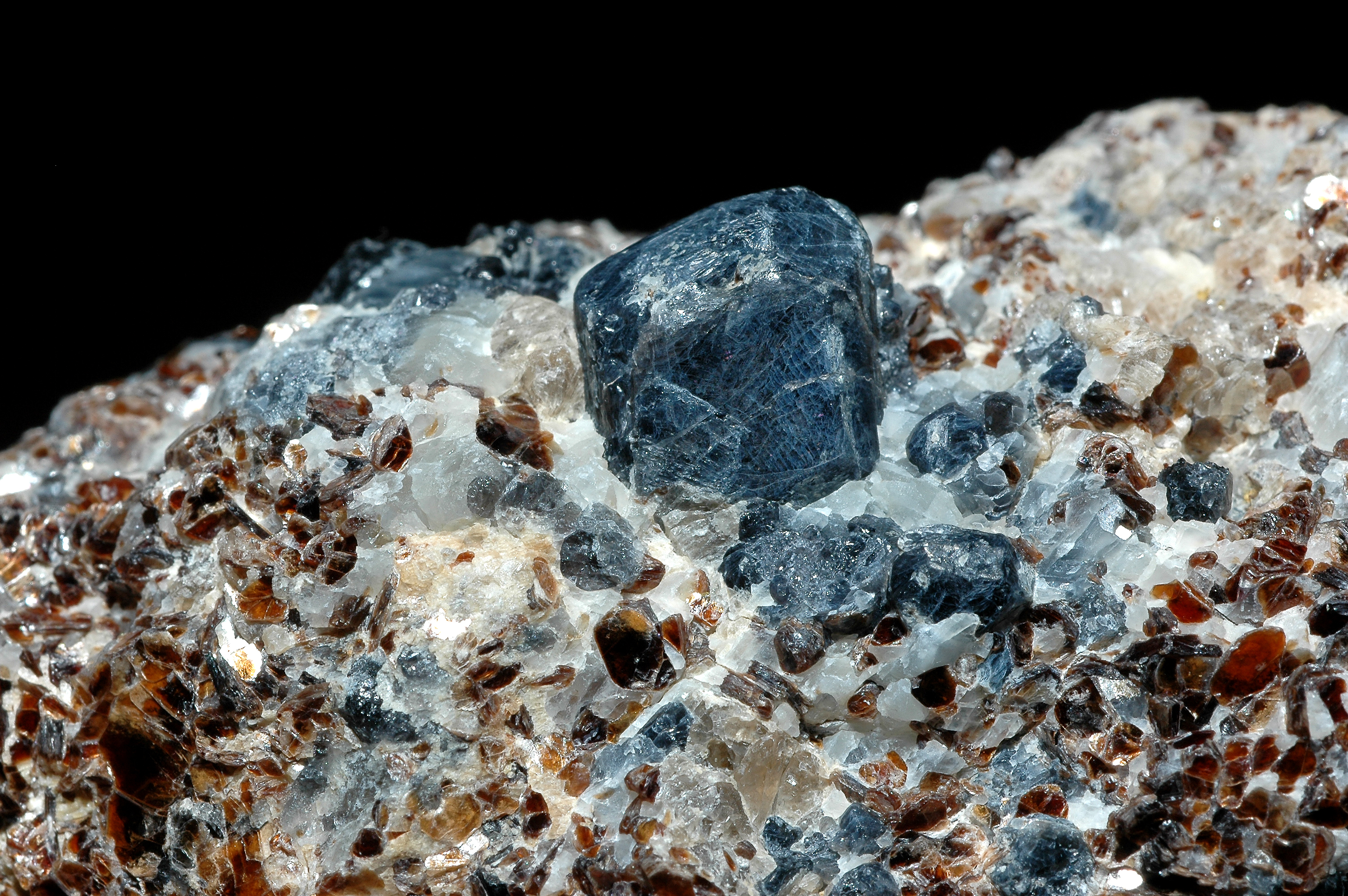
Sapphirine from Madagascar

Typical colours range from light to dark sapphire blue, bluish to brownish green, green, and bluish or greenish gray to black; less common colours include yellow, pale red, and pink to purplish pink. Sapphirine is relatively hard (7.5 on Mohs scale), usually transparent to translucent, with a vitreous lustre. Crystallising in the monoclinic system, sapphirine is typically anhedral or granular in habit, but may also be tabular or in aggregates: Twinning is uncommon. Fracture is subconchoidal to uneven, and there is one direction of perfect cleavage. The specific gravity of sapphirine is 3.54–3.51, and its streak is white.

Sapphirine's refractive index (as measured by monochromatic sodium light, 589.3 nm) ranges from 1.701 to 1.718 with a birefringence of 0.006–0.007, biaxial negative. Refractive index values may correspond to colour: brownish green specimens will possess the highest values, purplish-pink specimens the lowest, and blue specimens will be intermediate between them. Pleochroism may be extreme, with trichroic colours ranging from: colourless, pale yellow or red; sky to lavender blue, or bluish-green; to dark blue. There is no reaction under ultraviolet light.

== Formation and occurrence ==
While there is evidence of magmatic origin in some deposits, sapphirine is primarily a product of high grade metamorphism in environments poor in silica and rich in magnesium and aluminium. However, sapphirine occurs in a variety of rocks, including granulite and amphibolite facies, calc-silicate skarns, and quartzites; it is also known from xenoliths. Associated minerals include: calcite, chrysoberyl, cordierite, corundum, garnet, kornerupine, kyanite, phlogopite, scapolite, sillimanite, spinel, and surinamite.

Large crystals of fine clarity and colour are known from very few locales: The Central Province (Hakurutale and Munwatte) of Sri Lanka has long been known as a source of facetable greenish blue to dark blue material, and crystals up to 30 mm or more in size have been found in Fianarantsoa (Betroka District) and Toliara Province (Androy and Anosy regions), southern Madagascar. Sapphirine's type locality is Fiskenaesset (Fiskenaes), Nuuk region, western Greenland, which is where the mineral was discovered in 1819.

Other notable localities include: Western Hoggar, Algeria; the Napier complex of Enderby Land and the Vestfold Hills of Antarctica; Delegate, New South Wales and the Strangways Range of the Northern Territory, Australia; Wilson Lake, Labrador; Donghai, Jiangsu province, China; Kittilä, Lapland, Finland; Ariège, Midi-Pyrénées, France; Waldheim, Saxony, Germany; Dora-Maira-Massiv, Province of Cuneo, Piedmont, Italy; Ulstein, Møre og Romsdal, and Meløy, Nordland, Norway; the Messina District of Limpopo Province and the Okiep Copper District of Northern Cape Province, South Africa; Falkenberg Municipality, Halland County, Sweden; Mautia Hill in the Kongwa region of Central Province, Tanzania; Isle of Harris, Outer Hebrides, Scotland; the Bani Hamid area of Semail Ophiolite, United Arab Emirates; the Dome Rock Mountains of La Paz County, Arizona, Stockdale, Riley County, Kansas; Cortlandt, New York; and Clay County, North Carolina; India The Eastern Ghats Mobile Belt.

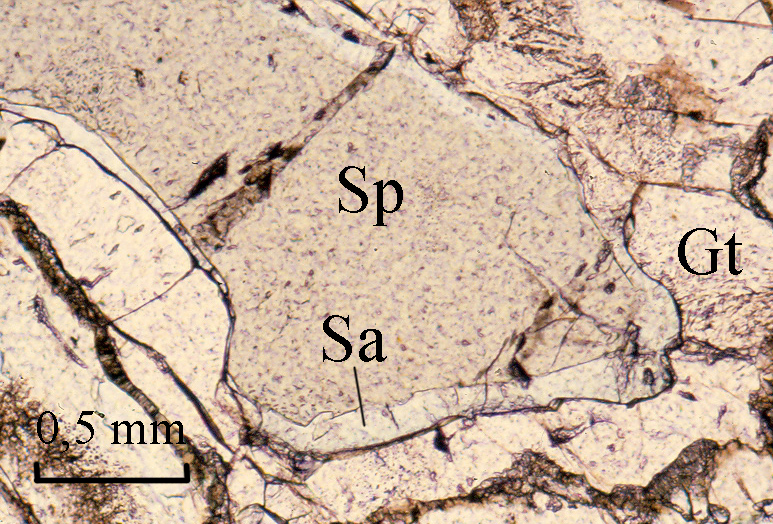
Thin inner rim of sapphirine (Sa, light blue) associated with a garnet outer rim (Gt, light pink) in a coronite having crystallized in between green spinel (Sp) and Al-rich clinopyroxene.

Sapphirine was also reported as a reaction product (together with garnet) in between Mg-Al-spinel and Ca-Tschermak-rich clinopyroxene in corundum-bearing mantle pyroxenites.
