= Isua Iron Mine =

Iron ore mine in Greenland

Isua
- Location within Greenland
- Location: Greenland; 65°30′N 50°20′W

The Isua Iron Mine is a proposed open-pit iron mine in southwestern Greenland, located approximately 150 kilometres northeast of the capital, Nuuk. The project was originally developed by the British firm London Mining Inc., which planned to extract and export high-grade iron ore containing around 70 percent iron from the edge of Greenland's ice cap. Ore from the site was to be transported via a 105-kilometre (65 mi) slurry pipeline to a year-round ice-free port at Taseraarssuk Bay, for shipment to steel manufacturers in Europe and Asia.

The project was expected to produce up to 15 million tonnes of ore annually, but development stalled after iron ore prices declined in the early 2010s. Following London Mining's bankruptcy in 2014, the rights to the mine were acquired by the Chinese conglomerate General Nice in 2015. However, due to continued low commodity prices and lack of activity, the Government of Greenland revoked General Nice's mining license in 2021.

== Concept ==
The plan involved shipping high-grade iron ore from open-pit mines in Greenland to manufacturers in Europe and Asia. As with the Baffinland Iron Mine on Baffin Island, the high quality of the ore was expected to offset the high costs of operating in a remote location. The ore's iron content of approximately 70 percent would require minimal processing before shipment.

The proposed mine site was located approximately 150 kilometres northeast of Nuuk, just south of the Arctic Circle, at the edge of Greenland's ice cap. It lies at a similar latitude to Maniitsoq, a small port on Greenland's west coast about 100 kilometres away.

While the similar Baffinland Iron Mine project planned to transport ore via a 150 km railway, the Isua Iron Mine intended to use a 105 km (65 mi) slurry pipeline. The ore would be shipped from a new port to be constructed in Taseraarssuk Bay, which is ice-free year-round.

== History and time plan ==
=== London Mining ===
In 2011, London Mining Inc., the firm planning to develop the site, stated the mine would be constructed and operational by 2015. It projected shipping 15 million tonnes of ore per year. However, by April 2013, journalist Jane George reported that development had stalled due to a drop in iron ore prices. In October 2013, London Mining and the Greenland Government signed an agreement granting an exploitation license for the mine. Construction was projected to cost at least $2.35 billion.

Jane George compared the relative openness and transparency of Baffinland's environmental review process with the criticism London Mining received for its opacity. London Mining was criticized for failing to effectively publicize its public information meetings and for not preparing briefing materials in both Danish and Greenlandic.

In October 2014, London Mining filed for bankruptcy, citing low ore prices and the impact of the Ebola outbreak on its largest mine in Sierra Leone.

=== General Nice ===
In January 2015, the Chinese company General Nice (Chinese: 俊安集团) acquired the Isua mining project. As of 2016, development remained on hold due to iron prices being too low to make the project economical.

In November 2021, the government of Greenland revoked General Nice's license for the project, citing prolonged inactivity and unpaid fees.
