= Energy Transition Minerals =

Australian mining company

Energy Transition Minerals Ltd
- Type: Proprietary limited company
- Traded as: ASX: ETM
- Industry: Rare-earth minerals exploration
- Headquarters: Perth, Australia
- Key people: Daniel Mamadou Blanco (CEO and Managing Director)
- Website: etransmin.com

Energy Transition Minerals Ltd (formerly Greenland Minerals Limited, ASX Code: ETM) is an ASX-listed company focused on the exploration, development and financing of minerals, and rare earths. The company’s current projects include the Kvanefjeld, located in Greenland, the Penouta mine and Villasrubias, both located in Spain, and two Lithium projects located in the James Bay region in Canada.

== Kvanefjeld project ==
The Kvanefjeld project is located near the southwest of Greenland consisting of multi-element deposit including rare-earth elements (REE), zinc, and uranium, within marginal phases of the ilimaussaq intrusive complex. As at February 2015, the project has defined a total resource of 673 Mt @ 10,900 ppm TREO, 248 ppm U_{3}O_{8}, 10,000 ppm REO, 881 ppm Y_{2}O_{3}, 2,270 ppm Zn which contained 7.34 Mt TREO, 368 Mlbs U_{3}O_{8}, 1.53 Mt Zn using 150 ppm U_{3}O_{8} cut-off. The project shows higher grade portions located close to the ground surface. ETM aims to produce light and heavy RE concentrates, zinc concentrate, uranium concentrate, large-scale output, and long life of mine in the project area.

== 2021 Greenlandic general election ==
The company's plans became a significant political issue in the 2021 Greenlandic general election. The Inuit Ataqatigiit party called for a moratorium on uranium mining, putting into question the wider rare earth mining project, whilst the Siumut party voiced support, citing economic growth as a key reason. In a survey to determine the public opinion on mining in the Kvanefjeld deposit, 63% opposed such activity, of which 45% were very much against.

== Villarubias Project ==
The Villarubias project is located in the southwest corner of the province of Salamanca in Spain, close to the Portuguese border and 33 km away from Ciudad Rodrigo, the district capital. The project consists of a permit of investigation (11.4 km^{2}) acquired by Technology Metals Europe SL in 2021. The main target is a set of lithium-tantalum-niobium-tin-bearing aplite-pegmatite dykes. Of these minerals, the first three are critical raw materials for the EU, according to the list updated in 2020.

== Solo and Good Setting Lithium Projects ==
On 31 October 2023, the company announced that it entered into an agreement to acquire the Solo and Good Setting Lithium Projects in the rapidly growing James Bay region in Quebec, Canada. This marked a significant expansion in the Company's exploration asset portfolio. The James Bay region has numerous active exploration projects, resources, and emerging production. Its prominence within the global lithium sector is underscored by the extent of current exploration investment and significance of discoveries.

== Penouta mine acquisition ==
On 7 August 2025, the company announced that it was the successful bidder in an auction to acquire the Penouta tin-tantalum-niobium mine and processing facility in Galicia. The winning bid includes all mining rights, title, and related interests and assets of Strategic Minerals Spain, S.L. which went into administration. On 17 October 2025, the company was confirmed as the preferred and successful buyer by the relevant Spanish insolvency court. On July 21, 2026, the company officially completed the acquisition of the Penouta tin-tantalum-niobium mine, following approvals from the local Galician and Spanish authorities

== Shareholding ==
As of August 2025, OCJ investments Pty Ltd in Australia hold a 17% share of the company, while a Chinese company, Shenghe Resources holds a 7% share. The rest of the shares are held by other institutions and private investors.
