= Qaqqaarsuk deposit =

Niobium mine in Greenland

Qaqqaarsuk
- Location within Greenland
- Location: Qeqqata, Greenland; 65.38333°N 51.66667°W
- Products: Niobium

The Qaqqaarsuk deposit is a large niobium mine located in Qeqqata in southern Greenland. Qaqqaarsuk represents one of the largest niobium reserves in Greenland having estimated reserves of 3.5 million tonnes of ore grading 0.5% niobium.

== See also ==
- Motzfeldt mine
