= Motzfeldt mine =

Niobium mine located in southern Greenland

- Location within Greenland
- Location: Kujalleq, Greenland; 61.216371°N 45.032526°W
- Products: Niobium; Tantalum

The Motzfeldt area is a large niobium prospect located in southern Greenland in Kujalleq. Motzfeldt represents one of the largest niobium reserves in Greenland having estimated reserves of 130 million tonnes of ore grading 1% niobium and 0.04% tantalum. The project is based around a syenite complex in Southern Greenland , part of "the Gardar Province", the name given to the products of continental rifting in mid-Proterozoic times.

== See also ==
- Qaqqaarsuk deposit
