= Kvanefjeld =

- Location within Greenland
- Location: Kujalleq, Greenland; 60°59′N 46°00′W
- Company: Greenland Minerals
- Website: etransmin.com/kvanefjeld-project

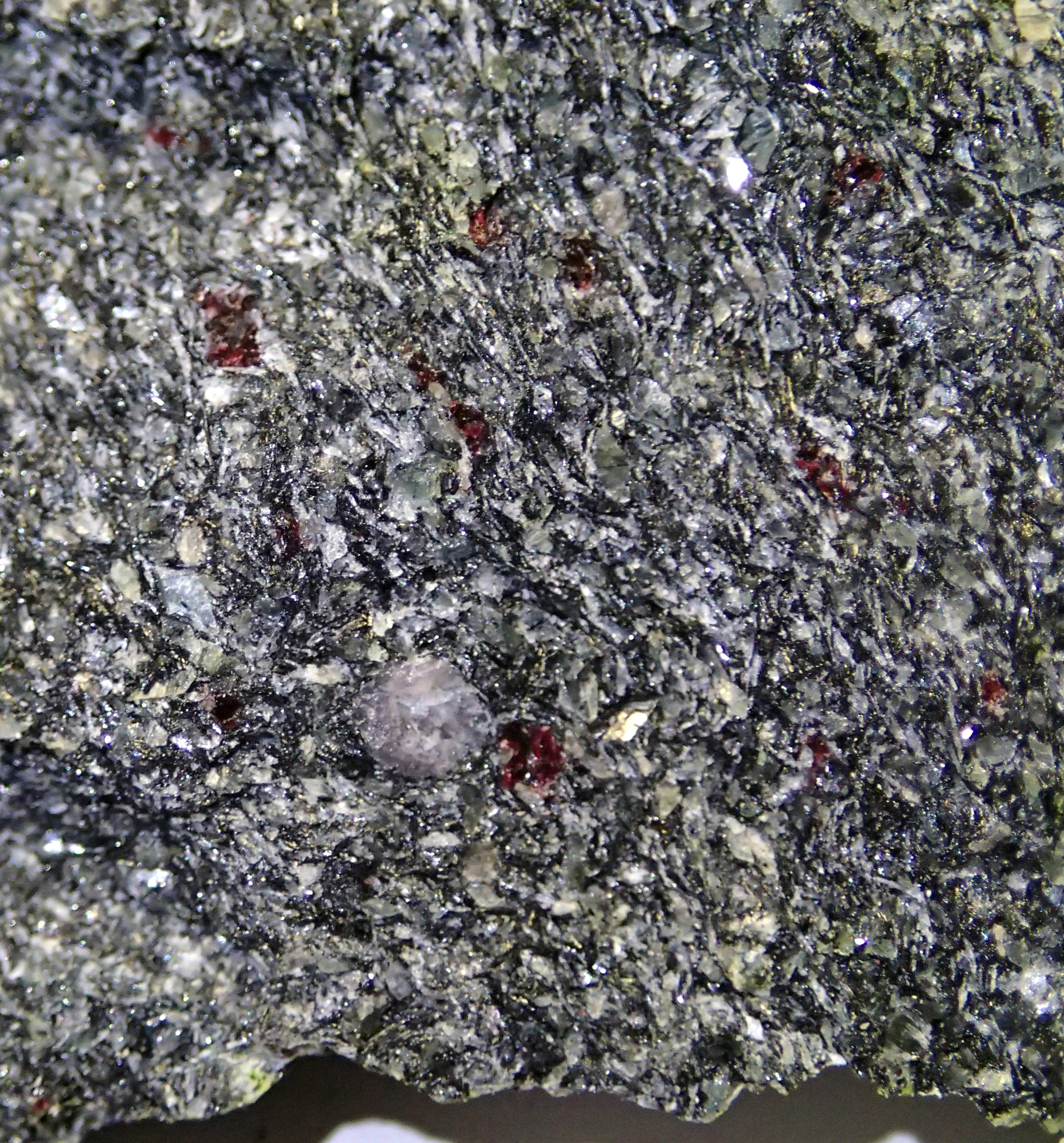
Villiaumitic lujavrite, Kvanefjeld. Field of view is 1.75 cm wide. Click for link to additional photos.

Kvanefjeld (or Kuannersuit), in Greenland, is the site of a mineral deposit, which is claimed to be the world's second-largest deposit of rare-earth oxides, and the sixth-largest deposit of uranium. There are also substantial sodium fluoride deposits, and Kvanefjeld is thought to be one of the largest multi-element deposits of its kind in the world.

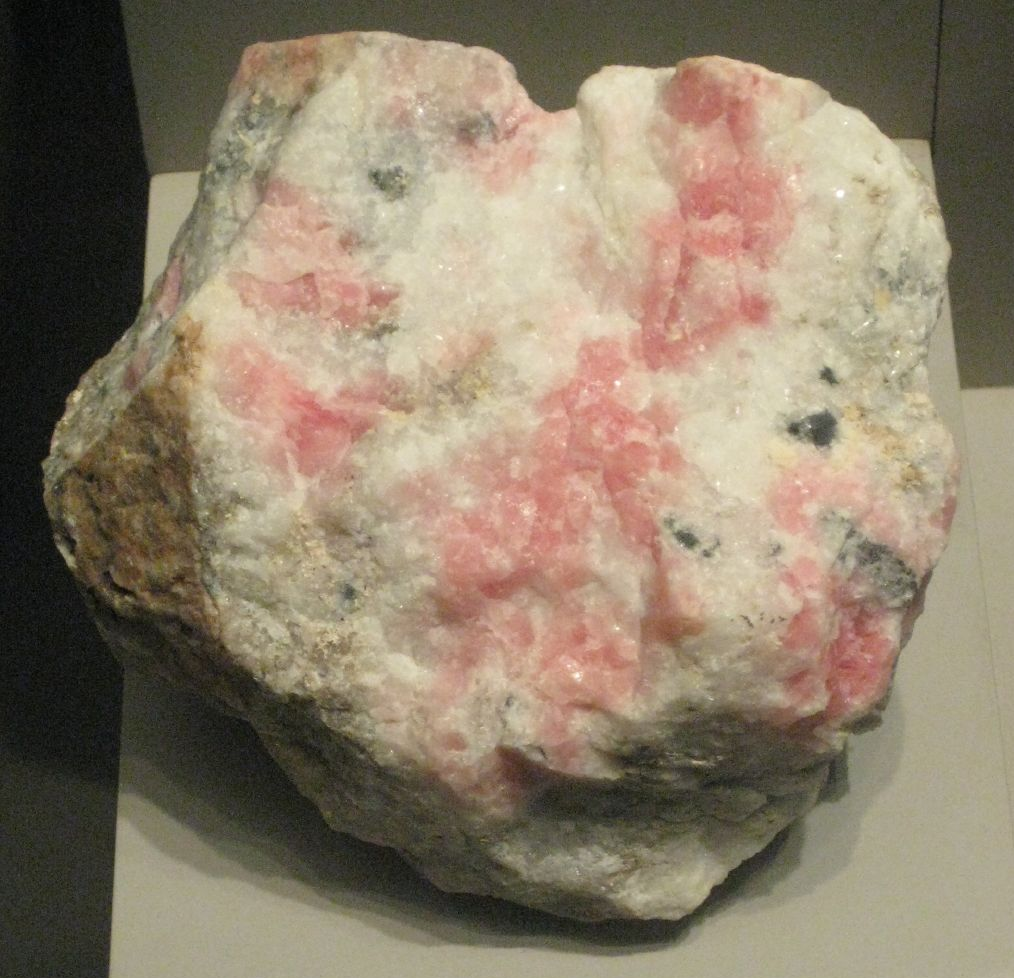
Tugtupite from Kvanefjeld, Greenland

== Geology ==
The Kvanefjeld site is part of the Ilimaussaq intrusive complex. Rare earths and uranium are typically concentrated in lujavrite.

Lujavrite, a dark agpaitic nepheline syenite, occurs as an internal layer in the north Ilimaussaq complex. The uppermost sections generally have the highest rare-earth elements, uranium and zinc grades.

Lujavrite is a rare variety of nepheline syenite having amphibole, aegirine pyroxene, nepheline and feldspar. The red spots in the rock are crystals of the rare halide mineral villiaumite (NaF - sodium fluoride).

Kvanefjeld is already known among mineral collectors as a source of fluorescent minerals such as tugtupite and chkalovite.

== Exploration ==
The mineral deposit was first discovered in the 1950s. Much of the historical process development focused on uranium extraction, including a promotional visit by physicist Niels Bohr to the nearby town of Narsaq in 1957. In 1983, the Danish government decided not to pursue the option of nuclear power, and work programs on Kvanefjeld ceased.

Greenland Minerals and Energy acquired the area in 2007.

A 2010 relaxation of regulations by the government of Greenland opened up the possibility of large-scale mining. A mining licence application to the Greenland government was submitted in 2015 for an open-pit mine.

In 2017, the major shareholder of GME was Chinese mining firm Shenghe Resources.

The mine became a significant issue in the 2021 Greenlandic general election, with the new governing coalition, Inuit Ataqatigiit and Naleraq, running on a platform opposing uranium mining. The subsequent ban on uranium mining effectively blocked development of the mine.

== See also ==
- List of countries by uranium production
- Rare earths trade dispute
- Cryolite
- List of countries by primary aluminium production
