= Kornerupine =

Sorosilicate mineral

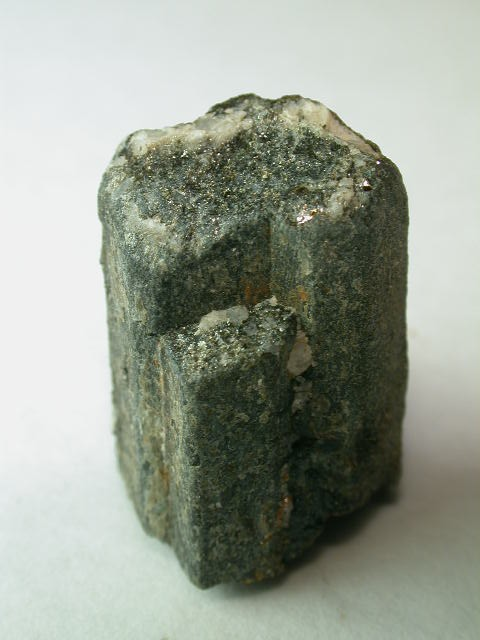

General
- Category: Borosilicates
- Formula: (Mg,Fe^{2+})_{4}(Al,Fe^{3+})_{6}(SiO_{4},BO_{4})_{5}(O,OH)_{2}
- IMA symbol: Krn
- Strunz classification: 9.BJ.50 (10 ed); VIII/B.31-10 (8 ed)
- Dana classification: 58.01.01.01
- Crystal system: Orthorhombic
- Crystal class: Dipyramidal (mmm); H-M symbol: (2/m 2/m 2/m)
- Space group: Cmcm
- Unit cell: a = 15.99, b = 13.7, c = 6.7 [Å]; Z = 4

Identification
- Color: Colorless, white, grey, greenish, bluish, brown, black
- Crystal habit: Prismatic crystals, radiating, massive, fibrous
- Cleavage: Good on {110}
- Mohs scale hardness: 6 to 7
- Luster: Vitreous
- Streak: White
- Diaphaneity: Transparent to translucent and opaque
- Specific gravity: 3.29–3.35
- Optical properties: Biaxial (−)
- Refractive index: n_{α} = 1.660 – 1.671 n_{β} = 1.673 – 1.683 n_{γ} = 1.674 – 1.684
- Birefringence: δ = 0.014
- Pleochroism: X = colorless to green; Y = colorless, pale brownish yellow, pale yellowish green; Z = pale brownish green, green, light amber
- 2V angle: Measured: 3° to 48°

Kornerupine (also called Prismatine) is a rare boro-silicate mineral with the chemical formula (Mg,Fe^{2+})_{4}(Al,Fe^{3+})_{6}(SiO_{4},BO_{4})_{5}(O,OH)_{2}. It crystallizes in the orthorhombic – dipyramidal crystal system as brown, green, yellow to colorless slender tourmaline like prisms or in massive fibrous forms. It has a Mohs hardness of 7 and a specific gravity of 3.3 to 3.34. Its indices of refraction are nα=1.660 – 1.671, nβ=1.673 – 1.683 and nγ=1.674 – 1.684.

It occurs in boron-rich volcanic and sedimentary rocks which have undergone high grade metamorphism. It is also found in metamorphosed anorthosite complexes.

Kornerupine is valued as a gemstone when it is found in translucent green to yellow shades. The emerald green varieties are especially sought after. It forms a solid solution series with prismatine. Strongly pleochroic, it appears green or reddish brown when viewed from different directions. It has a vitreous luster.

It was first described in 1884 for an occurrence in Fiskernæs in southwest Greenland. It was named in honor of the Danish geologist Andreas Kornerup (1857–1881). Although kornerupine was named in 1884, it was not until 1912 that gem-quality material was found and it remains uncommon to this day.

Deposits are found in Burma (Myanmar), Canada (Quebec), Kenya, Madagascar, Sri Lanka, Tanzania, and South Africa.
